= 2005 BYU Cougars football team =

American college football season

2005 BYU Cougars football

Las Vegas Bowl, L 28–35 vs. California
- Conference: Mountain West
- Record: 6–6 (5–3 MW)
- Head coach: Bronco Mendenhall (1st season)
- Offensive coordinator: Robert Anae (1st season)
- Offensive scheme: Air raid
- Base defense: 3–3–5
- Home stadium: LaVell Edwards Stadium

2005 Mountain West Conference football standings
	Conf.			Overall
Team	W		L	W		L
No. 11 TCU $	8	–	0	11	–	1
BYU	5	–	3	6	–	6
Colorado State	5	–	3	6	–	6
Utah	4	–	4	7	–	5
New Mexico	4	–	4	6	–	5
San Diego State	4	–	4	5	–	7
Air Force	3	–	5	4	–	7
Wyoming	2	–	6	4	–	7
UNLV	1	–	7	2	–	9
$ – Conference champion; Rankings from AP Poll

The 2005 BYU Cougars football team represented Brigham Young University during the 2005 NCAA Division I-A football season.

== Schedule ==
Date	Time	Opponent	Site	TV	Result	Attendance
September 3	1:30 pm	No. 22 Boston College*	LaVell Edwards Stadium; Provo, UT	ABC	L 3–20	58,108
September 10	1:00 pm	Eastern Illinois*	LaVell Edwards Stadium; Provo, UT	SWP	W 45–10	52,630
September 24	1:00 pm	TCU	LaVell Edwards Stadium; Provo, UT	ESPN+	L 50–51 ^{OT}	58,320
October 1	8:00 pm	at San Diego State	Qualcomm Stadium; San Diego, CA	SWP	L 10–31	41,680
October 8	6:00 pm	at New Mexico	University Stadium; Albuquerque, NM	SWP	W 27–24	39,233
October 15	8:00 pm	Colorado State^{†}	LaVell Edwards Stadium; Provo, UT	SWP	W 24–14	58,165
October 22	12:30 pm	at No. 9 Notre Dame*	Notre Dame Stadium; Notre Dame, IN	NBC	L 23–49	80,795
October 29	1:00 pm	Air Force	LaVell Edwards Stadium; Provo, UT	ESPN+	W 62–41	57,687
November 5	1:00 pm	at UNLV	Sam Boyd Stadium; Las Vegas, NV	ESPN+	W 55–14	23,677
November 12	4:00 pm	at Wyoming	War Memorial Stadium; Laramie, WY	SWP	W 35–21	15,889
November 19	1:00 pm	Utah	LaVell Edwards Stadium; Provo, UT (Holy War)	ESPN+	L 34–41 ^{OT}	64,312
December 22	6:00 pm	vs. California*	Sam Boyd Stadium; Las Vegas, NV (Las Vegas Bowl)	ESPN	L 28–35	40,053
*Non-conference game; ^{†}Homecoming; Rankings from AP Poll released prior to the game; All times are in Mountain time

•SportsWest Productions (SWP) games were shown locally on KSL 5.

== Roster ==
2005 BYU Cougars football team roster
Players
Coaches
Offense

Pos.	#	Name	Class
QB	12	John Beck	Sr
WR	1	Todd Watkins	Sr

Defense

Pos.	#	Name	Class
LB	41	Bryan Kehl	So

Special teams

Pos.	#	Name	Class

Head coach

- Bronco Mendenhall

Coordinators/assistant coaches

Legend

- (C) Team captain
- (S) Suspended
- (I) Ineligible
- Injured
- Redshirt

Roster

== Game summaries ==
=== Boston College ===
Team	1	2	3	4	Total
• #22/22 Boston College	7	3	0	10	20
BYU	0	0	3	0	3

- Date: September 3
- Location: LaVell Edwards Stadium, Provo, UT
- Game start: 1:40 p.m. MST
- Elapsed time: 3:27
- Game attendance: 58,198
- Game weather: Partly Cloudy, 77 °F (25 °C), wind S 10 mph (16 km/h)
- Referee: Tom Zimorski
- TV announcers (ESPN): Paul Page, Ray Bentley, Vince Welch

Scoring summary
1	0:30	BC	Chris Miller 14-yard pass from Quinton Porter (Ryan Ohliger kick)	BC 7-0
2	0:03	BC	Ryan Ohliger 39-yard field goal	BC 10-0
3	10:16	BYU	Jared McLaughlin 35-yard field goal	BC 10-3
4	14:53	BC	Chris Miller 4-yard pass from Quinton Porter (Ryan Ohliger kick)	BC 17-3
4	0:41	BC	Ryan Ohliger 26-yard field goal	BC 20-3

=== Eastern Illinois ===
Team	1	2	3	4	Total
Eastern Illinois	0	0	3	7	10
• BYU	17	14	0	14	45

- Date: September 10
- Location: LaVell Edwards Stadium, Provo, UT
- Game start: 1:00 p.m. MST
- Elapsed time: 3:15
- Game attendance: 52,630
- Game weather: Partly Cloudy, 67 °F (19 °C), wind NW 7 mph (11 km/h)
- Referee: Pete Gautreau
- TV announcers (SportsWest): Tom Kirkland, Blaine Fowler

Scoring summary
1	11:34	BYU	Curtis Brown 1-yard run (Jared McLaughlin kick)	BYU 7-0
1	8:55	BYU	John Beck 1-yard run (Jared McLaughlin kick)	BYU 14-0
1	2:47	BYU	Jared McLaughlin 20-yard field goal	BYU 17-0
2	12:31	BYU	Todd Watkins 31-yard pass from John Beck (Jared McLaughlin kick)	BYU 24-0
2	3:46	BYU	Todd Watkins 6-yard pass from John Beck (Jared McLaughlin kick)	BYU 31-0
3	9:48	EIU	Zach Yates 23-yard field goal	BYU 31-3
4	12:22	EIU	Vincent Webb 2-yard run (Zach Yates kick)	BYU 31-10
4	6:01	BYU	Naufahu Tahi 7-yard pass from John Beck (Jared McLaughlin kick)	BYU 38-10
4	0:41	BYU	Naufahu Tahi 6-yard run (Jared McLaughlin kick)	BYU 45-10

=== TCU ===
Team	1	2	3	4	OT	Total
• TCU	10	6	7	21	7	51
BYU	21	3	10	10	6	50

- Date: September 17
- Location: LaVell Edwards Stadium, Provo, UT
- Game start: 1:07 p.m. MST
- Elapsed time: 4:42
- Game attendance: 58,320
- Game weather: Partly Cloudy, 67 °F (19 °C), wind S 4 mph (6.4 km/h)
- Referee: Gerald Wright
- TV announcers (ESPN+): Trey Bender, Kelly Stouffer

Scoring summary
1	11:34	BYU	Zac Collie 7-yard pass from John Beck (Jared McLaughlin kick)	BYU 7-0
1	9:17	BYU	Todd Watkins 39-yard pass from John Beck (Jared McLaughlin kick)	BYU 14-0
1	9:05	TCU	Cory Rodgers 100-yard kickoff return (Chris Manfredini kick)	BYU 14-7
1	6:29	TCU	Chris Manfredini 43-yard field goal	BYU 14-10
1	5:03	BYU	Zac Collie 37-yard pass from John Beck (Jared McLaughlin kick)	BYU 21-10
2	12:33	TCU	Chris Manfredini 33-yard field goal	BYU 21-13
2	4:07	BYU	Jared McLaughlin 30-yard field goal	BYU 24-13
2	1:57	TCU	Chris Manfredini 31-yard field goal	BYU 24-16
3	11:25	BYU	Jared McLaughlin 47-yard field goal	BYU 27-16
3	10:14	BYU	Todd Watkins 67-yard pass from John Beck (Jared McLaughlin kick)	BYU 34-16
3	1:51	TCU	Cory Rodgers 2-yard run (Chris Manfredini kick)	BYU 34-23
4	13:41	TCU	William Jackson 1-yard run (Aaron Brown rush failed)	BYU 34-29
4	8:35	BYU	Curtis Brown 1-yard run (Jared McLaughlin kick)	BYU 41-29
4	6:02	TCU	Cory Rodgers 34-yard pass from Jeff Ballard (Chris Manfredini kick)	BYU 41-36
4	1:25	TCU	Aaron Brown 35-yard pass from Jeff Ballard (Jeff Ballard rush)	TCU 44-41
4	0:00	BYU	Jared McLaughlin 39-yard field goal	TIED 44-44
OT		BYU	Todd Wtakins 25-yard pass from John Beck (kick fumbled)	BYU 50-44
OT		TCU	Cory Rodgers 3-yard run (Chris Manfredini kick)	TCU 51-51

=== San Diego State ===
Team	1	2	3	4	Total
BYU	0	3	0	7	10
• San Diego State	0	17	7	7	31

- Date: October 1
- Location: Qualcomm Stadium, San Diego, CA
- Game start: 7:07 p.m. PST
- Elapsed time: 3:26
- Game attendance: 41,680
- Game weather: 71 °F (22 °C), clear and mild, wind NW 6 mph (9.7 km/h)
- Referee: Terry Leyden
- TV announcers (SportsWest): Tom Kirkland, Blaine Fowler

Scoring summary
2	8:57	SDSU	Kevin O'Connell 6-yard run (Garrett Palmer kick)	SDSU 7-0
2	5:54	SDSU	Garrett Palmer 36-yard field goal	SDSU 10-0
2	2:49	BYU	Jared McLaughlin 33-yard field goal	SDSU 10-3
2	0:37	SDSU	Lynel Hamilton 1-yard run (Garrett Palmer kick)	SDSU 17-3
3	10:39	SDSU	Brandon Bornes 4-yard run (Garrett Palmer kick)	SDSU 24-3
4	13:12	BYU	Naufahu Tahi 1-yard run (Jared McLaughlin kick)	SDSU 24-10
4	11:12	SDSU	Lynel Hamilton 6-yard run (Garrett Palmer kick)	SDSU 31-10

=== New Mexico ===
Team	1	2	3	4	Total
• BYU	6	7	0	14	27
New Mexico	7	14	3	0	24

- Date: October 8
- Location: University Stadium, Albuquerque, NM
- Game start: 6:09 p.m. MST
- Elapsed time: 3:25
- Game attendance: 39,233
- Game weather: 70 °F (21 °C), cloudy w/ rain, winds gusty SW
- Referee: Scott Novak
- TV announcers (SportsWest): Tom Kirkland, Blaine Fowler

Scoring summary
1	10:17	BYU	Daniel Coats 11-yard pass from John Beck (kick blocked)	BYU 6-0
1	8:32	UNM	Travis Brown 17-yard run (Kenny Byrd kick)	UNM 7-6
2	11:27	BYU	Joe Semanoff 5-yard pass from John Beck (Jared McLaughlin kick)	BYU 13-7
2	7:17	UNM	Kole McKinney 2-yard run (Kenny Byrd kick)	UNM 14-13
2	0:18	UNM	DonTrell Moore 1-yard run (Kenny Byrd kick)	UNM 21-13
3	3:00	UNM	Kenny Byrd 24-yard field goal	UNM 24-13
4	7:15	BYU	Curtis Brown 9-yard run (pass failed)	UNM 24-19
4	1:40	BYU	Matt Allen 22-yard pass from John Beck (Curtis Brown run)	BYU 27-24

=== Colorado State ===
Team	1	2	3	4	Total
Colorado State	0	0	7	7	14
• BYU	0	14	3	7	24

- Date: October 15
- Location: LaVell Edwards Stadium, Provo, UT
- Game start: 8:07 p.m. MST
- Elapsed time: 3:03
- Game attendance: 58,165
- Game weather: 66 °F (19 °C), cloudy w/ showers, winds W 15 mph (24 km/h)
- Referee: Rich Kollen
- TV announcers (SportsWest): Tom Kirkland, Blaine Fowler

Scoring summary
2	12:27	BYU	Curtis Brown 4-yard run (Jared McLaughlin kick)	BYU 7-0
2	1:32	BYU	Daniel Coats 3-yard pass from John Beck (Jared McLaughlin kick)	BYU 14-0
3	6:40	BYU	Jared McLaughlin 27-yard field goal	BYU 17-0
3	0:00	CSU	Kory Sperry 14-yard pass from Justin Holland (Kevin Mark kick)	BYU 17-7
4	9:00	CSU	David Anderson 19-yard pass from Justin Holland (Kevin Mark kick)	BYU 17-14
4	2:07	BYU	Curtis Brown 2-yard run (Jared McLaughlin kick)	BYU 24-14

=== Notre Dame ===
Team	1	2	3	4	Total
BYU	10	0	13	0	23
• #9/10 Notre Dame	7	14	21	7	49

- Date: October 22
- Location: Notre Dame Stadium, Notre Dame, IN
- Game start: 1:38 p.m. CST
- Elapsed time: 3:46
- Game attendance: 80,795
- Game weather: 51 °F (11 °C), overcast w/ rain, winds W 7 mph (11 km/h)
- Referee: Gerald Wright
- TV announcers (NBC): Tom Hammond, Pat Haden, Lewis Johnson

Scoring summary
1	9:51	BYU	Jared McLaughlin 44-yard field goal	BYU 3-0
1	7:12	UND	Maurice Stovall 10-yard pass from Brady Quinn (D.J. Fitzpatrick kick)	UND 7-3
1	2:48	BYU	Jonny Harline 12-yard pass from John Beck (Jared McLaughlin kick)	BYU 10-7
2	10:33	UND	Jeff Samardzija 14-yard pass from Brady Quinn (D.J. Fitzpatrick kick)	UND 14-10
2	4:18	UND	Maurice Stovall 15-yard pass from Brady Quinn (D.J. Fitzpatrick kick)	UND 21-10
3	12:50	UND	Jeff Samardzija 21-yard pass from Brady Quinn (D.J. Fitzpatrick kick)	UND 28-10
3	9:11	BYU	John Beck 10-yard run (Jared McLaughlin kick)	UND 28-17
3	5:38	BYU	Todd Watkins 10-yard pass from John Beck (Beck pass failed)	UND 28-23
3	4:47	UND	Maurice Stovall 36-yard pass from Brady Quinn (D.J. Fitzpatrick kick)	UND 35-23
3	2:16	UND	Maurice Stovall 24-yard pass from Brady Quinn (D.J. Fitzpatrick kick)	UND 42-23
4	9:24	UND	Tom Zbikowski 83-yard interception return (D.J. Fitzpatrick kick)	BYU 49-23

=== Air Force ===
Team	1	2	3	4	Total
Air Force	0	7	7	27	41
• BYU	14	14	13	21	62

- Date: October 29
- Location: LaVell Edwards Stadium, Provo, UT
- Game start: 1:00 p.m. MST
- Elapsed time: 3:51
- Game attendance: 57,687
- Game weather: 41 °F (5 °C), rainy, winds S 3 mph (4.8 km/h)
- TV announcers (ESPN+): Trey Bender, Kelly Stouffer

Scoring summary
1	10:58	BYU	Michael Reed 14-yard pass from John Beck (Jared McLaughlin kick)	BYU 7-0
1	5:47	BYU	Nate Meikle 12-yard run (Jared McLaughlin kick)	BYU 14-0
2	9:47	AFA	Jason Brown 15-yard pass from Adam Fitch (Scott Eberle kick)	BYU 14-7
2	7:31	BYU	Curtis Brown 6-yard run (Jared McLaughlin kick)	BYU 21-7
2	1:07	BYU	Naufafu Tahi 14-yard pass from John Beck (Jared McLaughlin kick)	BYU 28-7
3	12:04	BYU	Jared McLaughlin 35-yard field goal	BYU 31-7
3	9:05	BYU	Dan Coats 15-yard pass from John Beck (Jared McLaughlin kick)	BYU 38-7
3	0:53	BYU	Jared McLaughlin 38-yard field goal	BYU 41-7
3	0:00	AFA	Jason Brown 57-yard pass from Adam Fitch (Scott Eberle kick)	BYU 41-14
4	12:47	AFA	Garrett Ryback 28-yard blocked punt return (kick failed)	BYU 41-20
4	10:52	BYU	Curtis Brown 4-yard run (Jared McLaughlin kick)	BYU 48-20
4	9:50	AFA	Chad Hall 8-yard pass from Adam Fitch (Scott Eberle kick)	BYU 48-27
4	9:36	AFA	Greg Kirkwood 36-yard pass from Adam Fitch (Scott Eberle kick)	BYU 48-34
4	5:12	BYU	Curtis Brown 20-yard run (Jared McLaughlin kick)	BYU 55-34
4	3:40	AFA	Victor Thompson 18-yard pass from Adam Fitch (Scott Eberle kick)	BYU 55-41
4	0:57	BYU	Curtis Brown 4-yard run (Jared McLaughlin kick)	BYU 62-41

=== UNLV ===
Team	1	2	3	4	Total
• BYU	7	20	14	14	55
UNLV	0	7	0	7	14

- Date: November 5
- Location: Sam Boyd Stadium, Las Vegas, NV
- Game start: 12:00 p.m. PST
- Elapsed time: 3:50
- Game attendance: 23,677
- Game weather: 70 °F (21 °C), clear, winds SE 6 mph (9.7 km/h)
- Referee: Terry Leyden
- TV announcers (ESPN+): Trey Bender, Kelly Stouffer

Scoring summary
1	6:15	BYU	Naufahu Tahi 1-yard run (Jared McLaughlin kick)	BYU 7-0
2	12:21	UNLV	Greg Estandia 5-yard pass from Jarrod Jackson (Sergio Aguayo kick)	TIED 7-7
2	8:42	BYU	Jared McLaughlin 45-yard field goal	BYU 10-7
2	6:17	BYU	Todd Watkins 11-yard pass from John Beck (Jared McLaughlin kick)	BYU 17-7
2	3:22	BYU	Curtis Brown 1-yard run (Jared McLaughlin kick)	BYU 24-7
2	0:00	BYU	Jared McLaughlin 37-yard field goal	BYU 27-7
3	12:51	BYU	Curtis Brown 11-yard pass from John Beck (Jared McLaughlin kick)	BYU 34-7
3	5:15	BYU	Naufahu Tahi 1-yard run (Jared McLaughlin kick)	BYU 41-7
4	13:49	UNLV	Erick Jackson 15-yard run (Sergio Aguayo kick)	BYU 41-14
4	10:07	BYU	Jonny Harline 11-yard pass from John Beck (Jared McLaughlin kick)	BYU 48-14
4	4:49	BYU	Wayne Latu 1-yard run (Jared McLaughlin kick)	BYU 55-14

=== Wyoming ===
Team	1	2	3	4	Total
• BYU	14	14	7	0	35
Wyoming	14	0	7	0	21

- Date: November 12
- Location: War Memorial Stadium, Laramie, WY
- Game start: 4:07 p.m. MST
- Elapsed time: 3:10
- Game attendance: 15,889
- Game weather: 38 °F (3 °C), cold and windy, winds WNW 35 mph (56 km/h)
- Referee: Scott Novak
- TV announcers (SportsWest): Tom Kirkland, Blaine Fowler

Scoring summary
1	10:17	WY	Jovon Bouknight 21-yard pass from Corey Bramlet (Rhett Almond kick)	WY 7-0
1	8:50	BYU	Curtis Brown 6-yard run (Jared McLaughlin kick)	TIED 7-7
1	2:16	BYU	Jonny Harline 14-yard pass from John Beck (Jared McLaughlin kick)	BYU 14-7
1	1:11	WY	Wynel Seldon 69-yard run (Rhett Almond kick)	TIED 14-14
2	7:50	BYU	Curtis Brown 6-yard run (Jared McLaughlin kick)	BYU 21-14
2	4:21	BYU	Naufahu Tahi 1-yard run (Jared McLaughlin kick)	BYU 28-14
3	10:12	WY	Wynel Seldon 2-yard run (Rhett Almond kick)	BYU 28-21
3	0:46	BYU	Jonny Harline 6-yard pass from John Beck (Jared McLaughlin kick)	BYU 35-21

=== Utah ===
Team	1	2	3	4	OT	Total
• Utah	14	10	7	3	7	41
BYU	3	0	21	10	0	34

- Date: November 19
- Location: LaVell Edwards Stadium, Provo, UT
- Game start: 1:07 p.m. MST
- Elapsed time: 4:15
- Game attendance: 64,312
- Game weather: Clear but hazy, 47 °F (8 °C), wind W 6 mph (9.7 km/h)
- Referee: Terry Leyden
- TV announcers (ESPN+): Trey Bender, Kelly Stouffer

Scoring summary
1	11:51	UTAH	Brian Hernandez 3-yard pass from Brett Ratliff (Dan Beardall kick)	UTAH 7-0
1	5:25	UTAH	Chad Jacobsen 15-yard pass from Brett Ratliff (Dan Beardall kick)	UTAH 14-0
1	0:19	BYU	Jared McLaughlin 31-yard field goal	UTAH 14-3
2	8:05	UTAH	Dan Beardall 35-yard field goal	UTAH 17-3
2	4:37	UTAH	Brett Ratliff 4-yard run (Dan Beardall kick)	UTAH 24-3
3	11:37	BYU	Curtis Brown 5-yard run (Jared McLaughlin kick)	UTAH 24-10
3	10:04	BYU	Curtis Brown 64-yard run (Jared McLaughlin kick)	UTAH 24-17
3	5:47	UTAH	Brian Hernandez 48-yard pass from Brett Ratliff (Dan Beardall kick)	UTAH 31-17
3	1:32	BYU	Todd Watkins 14-yard pass from John Beck (Jared McLaughlin kick)	UTAH 31-24
4	10:35	UTAH	Dan Beardall 44-yard field goal	UTAH 34-24
4	8:31	BYU	Matt Allen 28-yard pass from John Beck (Jared McLaughlin kick)	UTAH 34-31
4	4:50	BYU	Jared McLaughlin 37-yard field goal	TIED 34-34
OT		UTAH	Travis LaTendresse 25-yard pass from Brett Ratliff (Dan Beardall kick)	UTAH 41-34

=== Las Vegas Bowl: California ===
Team	1	2	3	4	Total
BYU	0	14	0	14	28
• Cal	7	14	14	0	35

- Date: December 22
- Location: Sam Boyd Stadium, Las Vegas, NV
- Game start: 5:00 p.m. PST
- Elapsed time: 3:49
- Game attendance: 40,053
- Game weather: 61 °F (16 °C), cloudy, winds 0 mph (0 km/h)
- Referee: Gil Gelbke
- TV announcers (ESPN/Sports USA): Sean McDonough, Mike Gottfried, Alex Flanagan (ESPN)
  Larry Kahn, John Robinson (Sports USA)

Scoring summary
1	11:56	CAL	Marshawn Lynch 3-yard run (Tom Schneider kick)	CAL 7-0
2	14:16	BYU	Curtis Brown 19-yard pass from John Beck (Jared McLaughlin kick)	TIED 7-7
2	12:00	CAL	Marshawn Lynch 12-yard run (Tom Schneider kick)	CAL 14-7
2	0:38	BYU	Naufahu Tahi 3-yard run (Jared McLaughlin kick)	TIED 14-14
2	0:03	CAL	DeSean Jackson 42-yard pass from Steve Levy (Tom Schneider kick)	CAL 21-14
3	10:47	CAL	Marshawn Lynch 35-yard run (Tom Schneider kick)	CAL 28-14
3	3:48	CAL	DeSean Jackson 22-yard pass from Steve Levy (Tom Schneider kick)	BYU 35-14
4	14:14	BYU	Jonny Harline 14-yard pass from John Beck (Jared McLaughlin kick)	CAL 35-21
4	5:35	BYU	Todd Watkins 9-yard pass from John Beck (Jared McLaughlin kick)	CAL 35-28
