= 2005 Mountain West Conference football season =

- League: NCAA Division I-A
- Sport: football
- Teams: 9

2006 NFL Draft
- Top draft pick: C Ryan Cook, New Mexico
- Picked by: Minnesota Vikings, 51st overall

Regular season
- Season champions: TCU
- Runners-up: BYU
- Top scorer: DonTrell Moore (105 points)

Football seasons
- 2004 2006

2005 Mountain West Conference football standings
| | Conf. | | | Overall |
| Team | W | | L | W | | L |
|---|---|---|---|---|---|---|
| No. 11 TCU $ | 8 | – | 0 | 11 | – | 1 |
| BYU | 5 | – | 3 | 6 | – | 6 |
| Colorado State | 5 | – | 3 | 6 | – | 6 |
| Utah | 4 | – | 4 | 7 | – | 5 |
| New Mexico | 4 | – | 4 | 6 | – | 5 |
| San Diego State | 4 | – | 4 | 5 | – | 7 |
| Air Force | 3 | – | 5 | 4 | – | 7 |
| Wyoming | 2 | – | 6 | 4 | – | 7 |
| UNLV | 1 | – | 7 | 2 | – | 9 |
$ – Conference champion; Rankings from AP Poll

The 2005 Mountain West Conference football season was the 7th since eight former members of the Western Athletic Conference banded together to form the MW. Texas Christian University was added as the conference's 9th member in 2005, and won the conference championship in their first season since moving over from Conference USA.

== Coaching changes ==
- Bronco Mendenhall took over at BYU, replacing Gary Crowton.
- Mike Sanford took over at UNLV, replacing John Robinson.
- Kyle Whittingham took over at Utah, replacing Urban Meyer.

== Bowl games ==
| Bowl | Date | Stadium | City | Result |
|---|---|---|---|---|
| Poinsettia Bowl | December 22, 2005 | Qualcomm Stadium | San Diego | Navy 51, Colorado State 30 |
| Las Vegas Bowl | December 22, 2005 | Sam Boyd Stadium | Las Vegas, Nevada | Cal 35, BYU 28 |
| Emerald Bowl | December 29, 2005 | SBC Park | San Francisco | Utah 38, Georgia Tech 10 |
| Houston Bowl | December 31, 2005 | Reliant Stadium | Houston | TCU 27, Iowa State 24 |

== Awards ==
- Coach of the Year: Gary Patterson, TCU
- Offensive Player of the Year: RB DonTrell Moore, Sr, New Mexico
- Defensive Player of the Year: DB Eric Weddle, Jr, Utah
- Freshman of the Year: RB Aaron Brown, TCU

== All-Conference teams ==
First-team:

Offense
| Quarterback | John Beck, Jr, BYU |
| Running back | Curtis Brown, Sr, BYU; DonTrell Moore, Sr, New Mexico |
| Wide receiver | Hank Baskett, Sr, New Mexico; Jovon Bouknight, Sr, Wyoming |
| Tight end | Jonny Harline, Jr, BYU |
| Offensive Line | Ryan Cook, Sr, New Mexico; Robert Turner, Jr, New Mexico; Herb Taylor, Jr, TCU; Michael Toudouze, Sr, TCU; Jesse Boone, Sr, Utah |
| Kicker | Dan Beardall, Sr, Utah |
| Kick returner | Cory Rodgers, Jr, TCU |

Defense
| Defensive line | Tommy Blake, So, TCU; Chase Ortiz, So, TCU; Evroy Thompson, Sr, New Mexico; Steve Fifita, Sr, Utah |
| Linebacker | Mike Mohoric, Sr, New Mexico; Freddie Keiaho, Sr, San Diego State; Spencer Toone, Sr, Utah |
| Defensive back | Gabriel Fulbright, Sr, New Mexico; Marcus Demps, Sr, San Diego State; Eric Weddle, Jr, Utah; Quincy Butler, Sr, TCU |
| Punter | Jimmie Kaylor, So, Colorado State |

Second-team:

Offense
| Quarterback | Brian Johnson, So, Utah |
| Running back | Kyle Bell, So, Colorado State; Quinton Ganther, Sr, Utah |
| Wide receiver | David Anderson, Sr, Colorado State; Jeff Webb, Sr, San Diego State |
| Tight end | Greg Estandia, Sr, UNLV |
| Offensive Line | Jon Wilson, Sr, Air Force; Jake Kuresa, Jr, BYU; Lance Reynolds, Sr, BYU; Mike Brisiel, Sr, Colorado State; Tavo Tupola, Jr, Utah |
| Kicker | Chris Manfredini, So, TCU |
| Kick returner | Jovon Bouknight, Sr, Wyoming |

Defense
| Defensive line | Manaia Brown, Sr, BYU; Kurt Kahui, Sr, San Diego State; Ranorris Ray, Sr, TCU; Dusty Hoffschneider, Sr, Wyoming |
| Linebacker | Cameron Jensen, Jr, BYU; Jason Phillips, Fr, TCU; Beau Bell, So, UNLV |
| Defensive back | Drew Coleman, Sr, TCU; Jeremy Modkins, Sr, TCU; Joe Miklos, Sr, UNLV; Casey Evans, Jr, Utah |
| Punter | Michael Hughes, So, San Diego State |
