= 2005 Colorado State Rams football team =

American college football season

2005 Colorado State Rams football
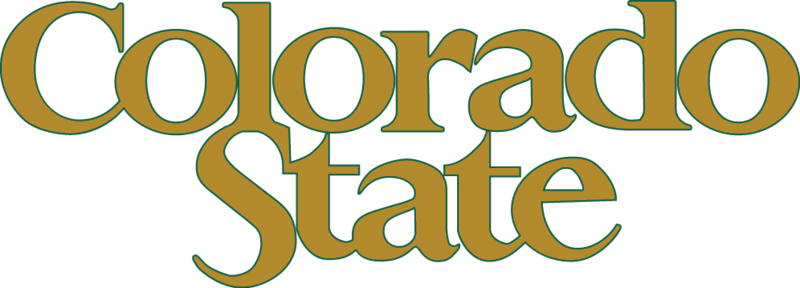

Poinsettia Bowl, L 30–51 vs. Navy
- Conference: Mountain West Conference
- Record: 6–6 (5–3 MW)
- Head coach: Sonny Lubick (13th season)
- Offensive coordinator: Dan Hammerschmidt (5th season)
- Defensive coordinator: Steve Stanard (3rd season)
- Home stadium: Sonny Lubick Field at Hughes Stadium

2005 Mountain West Conference football standings
	Conf.			Overall
Team	W		L	W		L
No. 11 TCU $	8	–	0	11	–	1
BYU	5	–	3	6	–	6
Colorado State	5	–	3	6	–	6
Utah	4	–	4	7	–	5
New Mexico	4	–	4	6	–	5
San Diego State	4	–	4	5	–	7
Air Force	3	–	5	4	–	7
Wyoming	2	–	6	4	–	7
UNLV	1	–	7	2	–	9
$ – Conference champion; Rankings from AP Poll

The 2005 Colorado State Rams football team represented Colorado State University in the college football 2005 NCAA Division I-A football season. They played their home games at Hughes Stadium in Fort Collins, CO and were led by head coach Sonny Lubick.

== Schedule ==
Date	Time	Opponent	Site	TV	Result	Attendance
September 3	1:30 pm	at Colorado*	Folsom Field; Boulder, CO (Rocky Mountain Showdown)	TBS	L 28–31	54,972
September 10	12:00 pm	at Minnesota*	Hubert H. Humphrey Metrodome; Minneapolis, MN	ESPN2	L 24–56	40,221
September 24	4:00 pm	Nevada*	Hughes Stadium; Fort Collins, CO	SPW	W 42–21	29,101
September 29	5:30 pm	Air Force	Hughes Stadium; Fort Collins, CO (rivalry)	ESPN	W 41–23	26,711
October 8	4:30 pm	Utah^{†}	Hughes Stadium; Fort Collins, CO	SPW	W 21–17	32,713
October 15	8:00 pm	at BYU	LaVell Edwards Stadium; Provo, UT	SPW	L 14–24	58,165
October 22	1:00 pm	Wyoming	Hughes Stadium; Fort Collins, CO (rivalry)	ESPNC	W 39–31	32,801
October 28	6:00 pm	at New Mexico	University Stadium; Albuquerque, NM	ESPN2	W 35–25	36,390
November 5	5:00 pm	at No. 20 TCU	Amon G. Carter Stadium; Fort Worth, TX	ESPNGP	L 6–33	36,284
November 12	1:00 pm	San Diego State	Hughes Stadium; Fort Collins, CO	ESPN Plus	L 10–30	25,411
November 19	2:00 pm	at UNLV	Sam Boyd Stadium; Whitney, NV		W 31–27	16,543
December 22	8:30 pm	vs. Navy*	Qualcomm Stadium; San Diego, CA (Poinsettia Bowl)	ESPN2	L 30–51	36,842
*Non-conference game; ^{†}Homecoming; Rankings from AP Poll released prior to the game; All times are in Mountain time

== Roster ==
2005 Colorado State Rams football team roster
Players
Coaches
Offense

Pos.	#	Name	Class
RB	29	Kyle Bell	So
OL	71	Clint Oldenburg	Jr

Defense

Pos.	#	Name	Class
DE	44	Bob Vomhof	So
DE	91	Tommie Hill	Fr

Special teams

Pos.	#	Name	Class
P	8	Jimmie Kaylor	So

Head coach

- Sonny Lubick

Coordinators/assistant coaches

Legend

- (C) Team captain
- (S) Suspended
- (I) Ineligible
- Injured
- Redshirt

Roster

== Team players in the NFL ==
Round	Pick	Player	Position	NFL cub
7	251	David Anderson	WR	Houston Texans
