= Brian Bonner (safety) =

American gridiron football player (born 1984)

No. 22, 20
- Position: Safety

Personal information
- Born: April 13, 1984 (age 42); Taft, Texas, U.S.
- Listed height: 5 ft 11 in (1.80 m)
- Listed weight: 200 lb (91 kg)

Career information
- College: Texas Christian
- NFL draft: 2008: undrafted

Career history
- San Diego Chargers (2008)*; New York Sentinels (2009); Edmonton Eskimos (2011)
- * Offseason or practice squad member only

Awards and highlights
- 2× First-team All-MW (2006, 2007)

Brian Michael Bonner (born April 13, 1984) is an American former professional football safety. He was signed by the San Diego Chargers as an undrafted free agent in 2008. He played college football at Texas Christian.

== Early life ==
Bonner attended A.C. Jones High School where he earned a total of nine letters (four in football, four in track and one in basketball). He played quarterback in football, recording 3,180 passing yards and 2,477 rushing yards in his career. As a senior, he was named All-South Texas Quarterback and Offensive Player of the Year by the Victoria Advocate. He was offered football scholarships at Georgia Tech, Houston and SMU but elected to play at TCU.

== College career ==
During Bonner's first two years at TCU, he saw little action. He redshirted in 2003 to make the transition from quarterback to safety, and was used sparingly in 2004. In 2005, Bonner led the team with four interceptions, two of which came in a win against Colorado State, which clinched the 2005 Mountain West Conference championship. As a junior in 2006, he was named first-team all-conference as a punt returner and second-team all-conference as a safety.

In 2007, Dave Campbell's Texas Football selected Bonner to their 2007 preseason all-Texas college team.

While at TCU, Bonner was a communications major with an emphasis in human relations.

== Professional career ==
=== Pre-draft ===
Bonner attended "Dallas Day," a pre-draft workout with the Dallas Cowboys.

Pre-draft measurables
Height	Weight	40-yard dash	10-yard split	20-yard split	20-yard shuttle	Three-cone drill	Vertical jump	Broad jump	Bench press
5 ft 10 7/8 in (1.80 m)	196 lb (89 kg)	4.61 s	1.50 s	2.62 s	4.43 s	7.21 s	31 in (0.79 m)	9 ft 5 in (2.87 m)	17 reps
All values from NFL Combine.

=== San Diego Chargers ===
After going undrafted in the 2008 NFL draft, Bonner signed with the San Diego Chargers. He was waived during final cuts on August 30.

=== New York Sentinels ===
Bonner was drafted by the New York Sentinels of the United Football League in the UFL Premiere Season Draft. He was signed with the team on August 5, 2009.

=== Edmonton Eskimos ===
Bonner was signed to the CFL's Edmonton Eskimos on April 25, 2011. He was released on September 7.
