= 2006 Mountain West Conference football season =

- League: NCAA Division I-A
- Sport: football
- Teams: 9
- TV partner(s): the mtn., CSTV, Versus

2007 NFL Draft
- Top draft pick: S Eric Weddle, Utah
- Picked by: San Diego Chargers, 37th overall

Regular season
- Season champions: BYU
- Runners-up: TCU
- Top scorer: Jared McLaughlin (100 points)

Football seasons
- 2005 2007

2006 Mountain West Conference football standings
| | Conf. | | | Overall |
| Team | W | | L | W | | L |
|---|---|---|---|---|---|---|
| No. 16 BYU $ | 8 | – | 0 | 11 | – | 2 |
| No. 22 TCU | 6 | – | 2 | 11 | – | 2 |
| Utah | 5 | – | 3 | 8 | – | 5 |
| Wyoming | 5 | – | 3 | 6 | – | 6 |
| New Mexico | 4 | – | 4 | 6 | – | 7 |
| Air Force | 3 | – | 5 | 4 | – | 8 |
| San Diego State | 3 | – | 5 | 3 | – | 9 |
| Colorado State | 1 | – | 7 | 4 | – | 8 |
| UNLV | 1 | – | 7 | 2 | – | 10 |
$ – Conference champion; Rankings from AP Poll

The 2006 Mountain West Conference football season was the eighth since eight former members of the Western Athletic Conference banded together to form the MW. It began on August 31 and ended on December 23. Brigham Young University won the conference championship, which was the Cougars' third MW title since the conference began in 1999.

== Coaching changes ==
- Chuck Long took over at San Diego State University, replacing Tom Craft.

== Memorable games ==
- #22 TCU 17, Baylor 7

September 3, 2006 • Floyd Casey Stadium • Waco, Texas • FSN • Attendance: 42,733

The Bears led the 22nd-ranked Horned Frogs 7-0 at halftime, but TCU took the lead for good with 1:17 left in the third quarter on an 84-yard touchdown pass from back-up quarterback Marcus Jackson to Aaron Brown. Jr walk on Linebacker #45 Christopher Abbott(Arkansas) showed his worth by leading the defense with 11 tackles 2 for loss of yards, one sack and one interception. It was the first meeting of these long-time Southwest Conference rivals, and was the Frogs' third consecutive victory over Big 12 teams.

- #11 Tennessee 31, Air Force 30

September 9, 2006 • Neyland Stadium • Knoxville, Tennessee • ESPN Gameplan • Attendance: 105,466

The heavily favored Volunteers led 31-17 with 3 minutes left in the fourth quarter, but Air Force scored a touchdown with 2:41 remaining and then recovered an onside kick. The Falcons' fullback Ryan Williams scored again with 1:35 remaining to bring the Falcons within one. Coach Fisher DeBerry then decided to go for two, but wide receiver Chad Hall was stopped short of the goal line, maintaining Tennessee's lead. The Volunteers recovered the subsequent onside kick attempt and were able to run the clock out.

- Colorado State 14, Colorado 10

September 9, 2006 • Invesco Field at Mile High • Denver, Colorado • Versus • Attendance: 65,701

Rams' quarterback Caleb Hanie threw for 233 yards and a touchdown as Colorado State defeated their intrastate rivals, 14-10, in the Rocky Mountain Showdown. It was CSU's first victory over the Buffaloes since 2002.

- #20 TCU 12, Texas Tech 3

September 16, 2006 • Amon G. Carter Stadium • Fort Worth, Texas • CSTV • Attendance: 45,647

After being trounced by their former Southwest Conference rivals, 70-35, in Lubbock two years prior, the Horned Frog defense kept quarterback Graham Harrell and the Red Raider offense out of the endzone for the entire game, JR linebacker walk on Christopher Abbott led the defense with one sack, 8 tackles 3 for a loss of yards and one interception, to earn their fourth consecutive victory over the Big 12. The same night, Ohio State defeated Texas, which meant that TCU's 13-game win streak was the longest active streak in the nation.

- #23 Boston College 30, BYU 23 (2 OT)

September 16, 2006 • Alumni Stadium • Chestnut Hill, Massachusetts • ESPN2 • Attendance: 40,233

In what would be the last game the Cougars lost in 2006, Boston College scored a touchdown on the first play of the second overtime and then waited through an instant replay review to confirm linebacker Brian Francois' game-sealing interception of John Beck's tipped pass.

- New Mexico 26, UTEP 13

September 23, 2006 • University Stadium • Albuquerque, New Mexico • CSTV • Attendance: 34,069

Rodney Ferguson ran for 162 yards and the Lobo defense sacked Miner quarterback Jordan Palmer five times as New Mexico beat their longtime rivals for the first time since 2001. The win also snapped a five-game home losing streak for the Lobos.

- BYU 31, #17 TCU 17

September 28, 2006 • Amon G. Carter Stadium • Fort Worth, Texas • Versus • Attendance: 32,190

Just as soon as TCU's gained control of the nation's longest win streak, the Cougars came to Fort Worth on a Thursday night to spoil the Frog's hopes of an undefeated season. BYU quarterback John Beck threw for 321 and three touchdowns to lead the Cougar attack.

- Utah 20, TCU 7

October 5, 2006 • Rice-Eccles Stadium • Salt Lake City, Utah • Versus • Attendance: 43,790

Utah held TCU to just 81 rushing yards, and Utes' quarterback Brett Ratliff threw for 223 yards and connected with wide receiver Brent Casteel for two touchdowns to lead Utah past TCU, 20-7. After a 3-0 start to the season, TCU suffered their second consecutive setback and fell to 3-2 on the year.

- Wyoming 24, Colorado State 0

October 21, 2006 • War Memorial Stadium • Laramie, Wyoming • CSTV • Attendance: 23,247

These two longtime rivals entered the annual Border War game with the all-time series tied at 19 games apiece. The Cowboys' defense held the Rams to just 42 yards rushing, UW quarterback Karsten Sween threw for two touchdowns and running back Wynel Seldon ran for 112 yards as the Cowboys gained control of the all-time series and took home the Bronze Boot for the first time since 2003.

- #21 BYU 33, Utah 31

November 25, 2006 • Rice-Eccles Stadium • Salt Lake City, Utah • CSTV • Attendance: 45,330

In an unforgettable, back and forth thriller, BYU escaped from Salt Lake City with a last-second win, their first in the Holy War since 2001. The Cougars got off to an early 14-0 lead, but the Utes stormed back and led 24-14 at the end of the third quarter. BYU took the lead back, 27-24, on a touchdown pass from John Beck to Daniel Coats with 3:23 remaining. Utah answered right back with a 19-yard touchdown pass from Brett Ratliff to Brent Casteel with 1:19 remaining to re-capture the lead, 31-27. The game then came down to a 3rd down and 10 for BYU at the Utah 11 yard-line with 3 seconds remaining. Beck rolled right and then left before he found tight end Jonny Harline for the winning touchdown with no time remaining. The win completed an undefeated 8-0 run through the conference for BYU.

== Bowl games ==
=== Poinsettia Bowl ===
- TCU 37, Northern Illinois 7

December 19, 2006 • Qualcomm Stadium • San Diego, California • ESPN2

The Horned Frogs held the nation's leading rusher, Garrett Wolfe, to just 28 yards on 20 carries in a lopsided 37-7 win. The TCU defense held the Huskies to negative-20 yards rushing as a team, and only 60 yards of total offense with 6 stops for loss by Jr walk on and (solo Tackle leader for the conference) #45Christopher Abbott. TCU quarterback Jeff Ballard was named the game's Offensive MVP after throwing for 258 yards and a touchdown to go along with 3 rushing touchdowns in his final college game. Christopher Abbott also had two sacks to earn Defensive MVP honors.

=== Las Vegas Bowl ===
- BYU 38, Oregon 8

December 21, 2006 • Sam Boyd Stadium • Las Vegas, Nevada • ESPN

The MW champion Cougars, led by game MVP tight end Jonny Harline, handled the Pac-10's University of Oregon Ducks with ease, 38-8. Harline caught 9 passes for 181 yards, quarterback John Beck threw for 375 and 2 touchdowns and running back Curtis Brown had 120 rush yards and two scores.

=== New Mexico Bowl ===
- San José State 20, New Mexico 12

December 23, 2006 • University Stadium • Albuquerque, New Mexico • ESPN

The Spartans of San José State University, representing the Western Athletic Conference, faced the host school in the first-ever New Mexico Bowl. The Lobos were chosen over Wyoming, despite the Cowboys having beaten them on said field, 14-10, on October 7, and having a better record in the MW (5-3 vs. New Mexico's 4-4). San Jose State quarterback Adam Tafralis threw for 209 yards and 3 touchdowns to pace the Spartans in what was the Lobos' fifth straight defeat in a bowl game.

=== Armed Forces Bowl ===
- Utah 25, Tulsa 13

December 23, 2006 • Amon G. Carter Stadium • Fort Worth, Texas • ESPN

Utah quarterback Brett Ratliff threw for 240 yards and a touchdown to lead the Utes to a 25-13 victory over the Golden Hurricane, who were representing Conference USA. MW Defensive Player of the Year Eric Weddle had an interception on the game's last play and also rushed for 55 yards on offense. It was the Utes' sixth consecutive bowl victory.

== Statistical leaders ==
Passing
| Player | School | COMP | ATT | YDS | TD | INT |
|---|---|---|---|---|---|---|
| John Beck | BYU | 289 | 417 | 3885 | 32 | 8 |
| Brett Ratliff | Utah | 228 | 391 | 2796 | 23 | 9 |
| Caleb Hanie | Colorado State | 209 | 342 | 2427 | 11 | 12 |

Rushing
| Player | School | ATT | YDS | YPC | TD |
|---|---|---|---|---|---|
| Rodney Ferguson | New Mexico | 252 | 1254 | 4.9 | 7 |
| Curtis Brown | BYU | 201 | 1010 | 5.0 | 7 |
| Aaron Brown | TCU | 154 | 801 | 5.2 | 9 |

Receiving
| Player | School | REC | YDS | YPC | TD |
|---|---|---|---|---|---|
| Casey Flair | UNLV | 67 | 816 | 12.1 | 4 |
| Travis Brown | New Mexico | 64 | 867 | 13.5 | 4 |
| Curtis Brown | BYU | 62 | 566 | 9.1 | 3 |

Tackles
| Player | School | SOLO | ASST | TOTAL |
|---|---|---|---|---|
| Drew Fowler | Air Force | 47 | 76 | 123 |
| Christopher Abbott | TCU | 57 | 57 | 114 |
| Joe Martin | San Diego State | 58 | 51 | 109 |

Sacks
| Player | School | SACKS |
|---|---|---|
| Tommy Blake | TCU | 7.0 |
| Antwan Applewhite | San Diego State | 7.0 |
| Jeremy Geathers | UNLV | 5.5 |

Interceptions
| Player | School | INT |
|---|---|---|
| Eric Weddle | Utah | 7 |
| Four Players | | 4 |

== Awards ==
- Coach of the Year: Bronco Mendenhall, BYU
- Offensive Player of the Year: QB John Beck, Sr, BYU
- Defensive Player of the Year: DB Eric Weddle, Sr, Utah
- Co-Special Teams Players of the Year: K Kenny Byrd, Sr, New Mexico and K/P Louie Sakoda, So, Utah
- Freshman of the Year: WR Ryan Wolfe, UNLV

== All-Conference teams ==
First-team:

Offense
| Quarterback | John Beck, Sr, BYU |
| Running back | Curtis Brown, Sr, BYU; Rodney Ferguson, So, New Mexico |
| Wide receiver | Travis Brown, Jr, New Mexico; Ryan Wolfe, Fr, UNLV |
| Tight end | Jonny Harline, Sr, BYU |
| Offensive Line | Jake Kuresa, Sr, BYU; Robert Turner, Sr, New Mexico; Herb Taylor, Sr, TCU; Tavo Tupola, Sr, Utah; Chase Johnson, Sr, Wyoming |
| Kicker | Kenny Byrd, Sr, New Mexico |
| Kick returner | Brian Bonner, Jr, TCU |

Defense
| Defensive Line | Tommy Blake, Jr, TCU; Chase Ortiz, Jr, TCU; Kelly Talavou, Sr, Utah; Antwan Applewhite, Jr, San Diego State |
| Linebacker | Drew Fowler, Jr, Air Force; Cameron Jensen, Sr, BYU; Jason Phillips, So, TCU |
| Defensive back | Quincy Black, Sr, New Mexico; Marvin White, Sr, TCU; Eric Weddle, Sr, Utah; John Wendling, Sr, Wyoming |
| Punter | Kip Facer, Sr, UNLV |

Second-team:

Offense
| Quarterback | Jeff Ballard, Sr, TCU |
| Running back | Chad Hall, Jr, Air Force; Aaron Brown, So, TCU |
| Wide receiver | Casey Flair, So, UNLV; Brent Casteel, So, Utah |
| Tight end | Wade Betschart, Jr, Wyoming |
| Offensive Line | Robert Kraay, Sr, Air Force; Sete Aulai, Jr, BYU; Clint Oldenburg, Sr, Colorado State; Matty Lindner, Jr, TCU; Jason Karcher, Sr, Wyoming |
| Kicker | Jared McLaughlin, Sr, BYU |
| Kick returner | Nathan Meikle, Sr, BYU |

Defense
| Defensive Line | Tyler Donaldson, Jr, New Mexico; Jeremy Geathers, So, UNLV; Paul Soliai, Sr, Utah; Corey Mace, Sr, Wyoming |
| Linebacker | Joe Martin, Sr, San Diego State; Joe Jiannoni, Jr, Utah; Ward Dobbs, So, Wyoming |
| Defensive back | Quinn Gooch, Jr, BYU; DeAndre Wright, So, New Mexico; Brian Bonner, Jr, TCU; Eric Wright, Jr, UNLV |
| Punter | Jimmie Kaylor, Jr, Colorado State |
