= 2005 Houston Bowl =

2005 EV1.net Houston Bowl
| TCU Horned Frogs | Iowa State Cyclones |
| (10–1) | (7–4) |
| Mountain West | Big 12 |
| 27 | 24 |
| Head coach: Gary Patterson | Head coach: Dan McCarney |
| AP / Coaches / BCS; 14 / 14 / 14 |
| | 1 | 2 | 3 | 4 | Total |
|---|---|---|---|---|---|
| TCU | 14 | 10 | 0 | 3 | 27 |
| Iowa State | 0 | 17 | 7 | 0 | 24 |
- Date: December 31, 2005
- Season: 2005
- Stadium: Reliant Stadium
- Location: Houston, Texas
- Referee: Dennis Hennigan (Big East)
- Payout: US$1,200,000 per team

United States TV coverage
- Network: ESPN
- Announcers: Dave LaMont, Terry Bowden

The 2005 EV1.net Houston Bowl was the sixth and final edition of the college football bowl games and was played at Reliant Stadium in Houston, Texas. The game pitted the Iowa State Cyclones from the Big 12 Conference and the TCU Horned Frogs from the Mountain West Conference (MWC). The game was the final competition of the 2005 football season for each team and resulted in a 27–24 TCU victory.

== Game summary ==
Scoring summary

| Quarter | Time | Drive | | | Team | Scoring information | Score | |
| Quarter | Time | Plays | Yards | TOP | Team | Scoring information | TCU | Iowa State |
|---|---|---|---|---|---|---|---|---|
| 1 | 10:19 | | 12 plays, 80 yards | | TCU | Robert Merrill 20-yard touchdown run, Chris Manfredini kick good | 7 | 0 |
| 1 | 8:24 | | 3 plays, 21 yards | | TCU | Aaron Brown 7-yard touchdown run, Chris Manfredini kick good | 14 | 0 |
| 2 | 14:14 | | 2 plays, 49 yards | | Iowa State | Todd Blythe 48-yard touchdown reception from Bret Meyer, Bret Culbertson kick good | 14 | 7 |
| 2 | 12:50 | | | | Iowa State | Team safety | 14 | 9 |
| 2 | 10:30 | | 5 plays, 63 yards | | Iowa State | Jon Davis 6-yard touchdown reception from Bret Meyer, 2-point pass good | 14 | 17 |
| 2 | 4:05 | | 1 plays, 84 yards | | TCU | Michael Depriest 84-yard touchdown reception from Jeff Ballard, Chris Manfredini kick good | 21 | 17 |
| 2 | 0:15 | | 9 plays, 24 yards | | TCU | 29-yard field goal by Chris Manfredini | 24 | 17 |
| 3 | 1:53 | | 6 plays, 53 yards | | Iowa State | Todd Blythe 22-yard touchdown reception from Bret Meyer, Bret Culbertson kick good | 24 | 24 |
| 4 | 5:25 | | 9 plays, 49 yards | | TCU | 44-yard field goal by Peter Lococo | 27 | 24 |
| "TOP" = time of possession. For other American football terms, see Glossary of American football. | | | | | | | 27 | 24 |
