= Joe Martin (American football) =

American football player (born 1983)

No. 51
- Position: Linebacker

Personal information
- Born: October 25, 1983 (age 43); Palmdale, California, U.S.
- Listed height: 6 ft 2 in (1.88 m)
- Listed weight: 229 lb (104 kg)

Career information
- College: San Diego State
- NFL draft: 2007: undrafted

Career history
- Baltimore Ravens (2007)*; California Redwoods (2009)*
- * Offseason or practice squad member only

Awards and highlights
- Second-team All-MW (2006)

Joe Martin (born October 25, 1983) is an American former football linebacker. He played college football at San Diego State University

== College career ==
Martin was a starting outside linebacker both his junior and senior year at San Diego State. During his junior season, he had 81 tackles. As a senior, he recorded 109 tackles.

== Pro career ==
Joe Martin signed with the Baltimore Ravens as a rookie free agent on May 4, 2007 and was released on December 2, 2007.

He was drafted to UFL San Francisco in the UFL's inaugural draft.
