= 2005 Utah Utes football team =

American college football season

2005 Utah Utes football

Emerald Bowl champion

Emerald Bowl, W 38–10 vs. Georgia Tech
- Conference: Mountain West Conference
- Record: 7–5 (4–4 MW)
- Head coach: Kyle Whittingham (1st season)
- Offensive coordinator: Andy Ludwig (1st season)
- Offensive scheme: Spread
- Defensive coordinator: Gary Andersen (1st season)
- Base defense: 4–3
- Home stadium: Rice-Eccles Stadium

2005 Mountain West Conference football standings
| | Conf. | | | Overall |
| Team | W | | L | W | | L |
|---|---|---|---|---|---|---|
| No. 11 TCU $ | 8 | – | 0 | 11 | – | 1 |
| BYU | 5 | – | 3 | 6 | – | 6 |
| Colorado State | 5 | – | 3 | 6 | – | 6 |
| Utah | 4 | – | 4 | 7 | – | 5 |
| New Mexico | 4 | – | 4 | 6 | – | 5 |
| San Diego State | 4 | – | 4 | 5 | – | 7 |
| Air Force | 3 | – | 5 | 4 | – | 7 |
| Wyoming | 2 | – | 6 | 4 | – | 7 |
| UNLV | 1 | – | 7 | 2 | – | 9 |
$ – Conference champion; Rankings from AP Poll

The 2005 Utah Utes football team represented the University of Utah in the 2005 NCAA Division I-A football season. This was Kyle Whittingham's first year as head coach after having been promoted from defensive coordinator following the departure of Urban Meyer for Florida. Their 4–4 conference record put them tied for fourth in the conference. The Utes played their homes games in Rice-Eccles Stadium.

== Schedule ==
| Date | Time | Opponent | Site | TV | Result | Attendance | Source |
|---|---|---|---|---|---|---|---|
| September 2 | 6:00 pm | Arizona* | Rice–Eccles Stadium; Salt Lake City, UT | ESPN | W 27–24 | 45,528 | |
| September 10 | 6:00 pm | Utah State* | Rice–Eccles Stadium; Salt Lake City, UT (Battle of the Brothers) | KJZZ | W 31–7 | 44,639 | |
| September 15 | 6:30 pm | at TCU | Amon G. Carter Stadium; Fort Worth, TX | ESPN | L 20–23 ^{OT} | 25,220 | |
| September 22 | 5:30 pm | Air Force | Rice–Eccles Stadium; Salt Lake City, UT | ESPN | W 38–35 | 41,935 | |
| October 1 | 1:35 pm | at North Carolina* | Kenan Stadium; Chapel Hill, NC | KJZZ | L 17–31 | 50,000 | |
| October 8 | 4:30 pm | at Colorado State | Hughes Stadium; Fort Collins, CO | KJZZ | L 17–21 | 32,713 | |
| October 15 | 5:00 pm | San Diego State^{†} | Rice–Eccles Stadium; Salt Lake City, UT | ABC | L 17–28 | 41,341 | |
| October 22 | 4:00 pm | at UNLV | Sam Boyd Stadium; Las Vegas, NV | ABC | W 43–32 | 19,108 | |
| November 5 | 1:00 pm | Wyoming | Rice–Eccles Stadium; Salt Lake City, UT | | W 43–13 | 39,026 | |
| November 12 | 4:30 pm | New Mexico | Rice–Eccles Stadium; Salt Lake City, UT | KJZZ | L 21–37 | 36,746 | |
| November 19 | 4:30 pm | at BYU | LaVell Edwards Stadium; Provo, UT (Holy War) | ESPN Plus | W 41–34 ^{OT} | 64,312 | |
| December 29 | 1:30 pm | vs. Georgia Tech* | AT&T Park; California, CA (Emerald Bowl) | ESPN | W 38-10 | 25,742 | |
*Non-conference game; ^{†}Homecoming; All times are in Mountain time

== After the season ==
=== NFL draft ===
Utah had two players taken in the 2006 NFL draft:

| Player | Position | Round | Pick | NFL club |
|---|---|---|---|---|
| Spencer Toone | Safety | 7 | 245 | Tennessee Titans |
| Quinton Ganther | Running back | 7 | 246 | Tennessee Titans |
