= Jake Kuresa =

American football player (born 1983)

No. 77
- Position: Offensive lineman

Personal information
- Born: October 2, 1983 (age 43); Millville, Utah
- Listed height: 6 ft 4 in (1.93 m)
- Listed weight: 330 lb (150 kg)

Career information
- High school: Mountain Crest (Hyrum, Utah)
- College: BYU
- NFL draft: 2007: undrafted

Career history
- New Orleans Saints (2007)*; Utah Blaze (2007–2008)
- * Offseason or practice squad member only

Awards and highlights
- First-team All-MW (2006); Second-team All-MW (2005)
- Stats at ArenaFan.com

Jacob Kuresa (born October 2, 1983) is an American former football offensive lineman. Out of college Jake was signed as an undrafted free agent by the New Orleans Saints on May 2, 2007, but was waived on August 22, 2007. Kuresa was a 4-year starter at guard and tackle after redshirting his freshman year. He attended Mountain Crest High School in Hyrum, Utah. His senior year (2006) at Brigham Young University, Kuresa was an Honorable Mention All-American selection and First-team All MWC Tackle.

== Family ==
Father Dave Kuresa was an offensive lineman at Utah State (1981–1984) and was a three time first-team All Pacific Coast Athletic Association (PCAA) from 1982 to 1984.
