= Quincy Butler (gridiron football) =

American football player and coach (born 1981)

No. 36, 16, 0
- Position: Cornerback

Personal information
- Born: November 25, 1981 (age 44); San Antonio, Texas, U.S.
- Listed height: 6 ft 1 in (1.85 m)
- Listed weight: 190 lb (86 kg)

Career information
- High school: Theodore Roosevelt (San Antonio)
- College: Tyler Junior College (2002–2003); TCU (2004–2005)
- NFL draft: 2006: undrafted

Career history

Playing
- Dallas Cowboys (2006–2007); Calgary Stampeders (2008)*; New Orleans Saints (2008)*; Dallas Cowboys (2008); St. Louis Rams (2008–2009); New Orleans Saints (2010); St. Louis Rams (2010); New Orleans Saints (2011)*; Calgary Stampeders (2011–2014); Portland Thunder (2015)
- * Offseason or practice squad member only

Coaching
- Texas Wesleyan University (2017–present) defensive backs coach

Awards and highlights
- Grey Cup champion (2014); First-team All-MW (2005); Junior College All-American (2003)

Career NFL statistics
- Games played: 22
- Total tackles: 40
- Pass deflections: 9
- Stats at Pro Football Reference

Career AFL statistics
- Total tackles: 3
- Interceptions: 1
- Stats at ArenaFan.com
- Stats at CFL.ca (archive)

Quincy Devone Butler (born November 25, 1981) is an American former professional football player who was a cornerback in the National Football League (NFL) for the Dallas Cowboys, New Orleans Saints and St. Louis Rams. He also was a member of the Calgary Stampeders in the Canadian Football League (CFL) and the Portland Thunder in the Arena Football League (AFL). He played college football for the TCU Horned Frogs.

== Early life ==
Butler attended Theodore Roosevelt High School. He was named first-team All-district as a quarterback in both his junior and senior seasons. He graduated in 2001.

== College career ==
Although he originally accepted a football scholarship from Texas Christian University, because of grades he had to enroll first at Tyler Junior College.

He was a two-time selection on the Southwest Junior College Football Conference All-league team. He was named to the 2003 NJCAA All-America team as a sophomore, after making 5 interceptions (one returned for a touchdown). He transferred to Texas Christian University after his sophomore season. In his 2 seasons, he recorded 151 tackles and eight interceptions.

As a junior, he started 8 games, registering 56 tackles (tied for second on the team), 5 passes defensed and 2 interceptions, one returned for a school record 99 yards.

Butler helped the TCU Horned Frogs win a conference championship in 2005 and was named First-team All-Mountain West Conference. He played in 11 games and made 53 tackles, 5 interceptions (led the team) and 8 passes defensed (tied for the team lead).

In addition, he was an All-American for the TCU Horned Frogs track and field team, placing 8th in the 4 × 400 meters relay at the 2006 NCAA Division I Indoor Track and Field Championships. He set a Mountain West Conference record in the indoor 4x400 relay in 2005 and a Conference USA record in the outdoor 4x400 in 2004.

== Professional career ==
=== Before the draft ===
Butler did not work out at the NFL Combine. At his pro day workout, he measured 6 ft 1 in (1.85 m), 190 pounds and ran a 4.40 40-yard time.

=== Dallas Cowboys ===
After not being selected in the 2006 NFL draft, he received a tryout invitation for rookie-minicamp, where he performed well enough to be signed as an undrafted free agent on May 8. He was released in the preseason on August 23 and signed to the practice squad on September 4. He was promoted to the active roster on December 23. He was declared inactive for the last 2 games of the season.

He was released in preseason of 2007 and again, assigned to the Dallas Cowboys practice squad. After the season, on January 11, 2008, he was released from the practice squad and re-signed five days later by the Cowboys. In 2008, he was limited with a hamstring injury and was released on August 25.

=== Calgary Stampeders ===
In 2008, Butler was signed by the Calgary Stampeders of the Canadian Football League (CFL) to their practice roster. He was released on October 8.

=== New Orleans Saints ===
In 2008, the New Orleans Saints signed him to their practice squad,

=== Dallas Cowboys ===
On October 28, 2008, the Dallas Cowboys signed him off the Saints practice squad. On December 5, he was released to make room for running back Alonzo Coleman.

=== St. Louis Rams ===
On December 10, 2008, he was claimed off waivers by the St. Louis Rams. He didn't play in the last 2 games of the 2009 season because of a left knee injury. He was released on September 5, 2010.

=== New Orleans Saints ===
On October 20, 2010, Butler was signed by the New Orleans Saints to replace Randall Gay, who was placed on injured reserve. He was cut to make room to activate safety Darren Sharper from the PUP list on October 24.

=== St. Louis Rams ===
On October 25, 2010, he was claimed off waivers by the St. Louis Rams. He wasn't re-signed after the season.

=== New Orleans Saints ===
On August 18, 2011, Butler signed with the New Orleans Saints. He was released before the start of the season on September 3.

=== Calgary Stampeders ===
Butler signed by the Calgary Stampeders of the Canadian Football League (CFL) to their practice roster on October 17, 2011. He made his CFL debut against the Montreal Alouettes on October 30, 2011. He played in the final two games of the regular season, registering 5 tackles. He also took part in the West Division semi-final against the Edmonton Eskimos.

In 2012, he started 11 regular-season games at defensive halfback, collecting 31 tackles (2 for loss), 3 special-teams tackles, 2 interceptions, one forced fumble, one fumble recovery and 5 passes defensed. He played the first seven games of the season and then sat out seven contests with a knee injury, before returning for the final four regular-season games and post-season. He started on the three playoff games, tallying 13 tackles, 2 interceptions and 3 passes defensed.

In 2013, he spent the first two games on the one-game injured list. He returned for the third game and played in three contests, while making six tackles (one for loss) and 2 passes defensed. He was placed on the 9-game injured list after the fifth game.

In May 2014, he pleaded guilty to assaulting a cab driver outside of a casino. He was suspended at the start of training camp on June 1 and rejoined the team through the practice roster on August 28. He was promoted to the active roster on September 13 against the Toronto Argonauts. He started in three games and had 13 tackles. He left the team for the season in October 2014, after being declared ineligible to work in Canada. The Stampeders would go on to win the Grey Cup.

=== Portland Thunder ===
On April 16, 2015, Butler was assigned to the Portland Thunder of the Arena Football League (AFL). On May 2, Butler threw his helmet into the stands at Wells Fargo Center in Philadelphia after being ejected from the game. After the incident, he was disciplined by being placed on reassignment on May 4.

== Personal life ==
In 2017, he was hired as the defensive backs coach at Texas Wesleyan University.
