= Kyle Bell =

American football player (born 1985)

No. 34
- Position: Fullback

Personal information
- Born: June 16, 1985 (age 41); Keenesburg, Colorado, U.S.
- Listed height: 6 ft 2 in (1.88 m)
- Listed weight: 234 lb (106 kg)

Career information
- College: Colorado State
- NFL draft: 2009: undrafted

Career history
- Jacksonville Jaguars (2009)*
- * Offseason or practice squad member only

Awards and highlights
- Second-team All-MW (2005)

Kyle Bell (born June 16, 1985) was born in Keenesburg, Colorado. He played fullback for the Colorado State Rams from 2004 to 2008. He was signed as an undrafted free agent by the Jacksonville Jaguars on April 26, 2009 after the 2009 NFL draft.

Bell tore his ACL and was waived by the Jaguars on June 23, 2009.

== Media career ==
Bell moved back to Denver from Vail in January 2011 to pursue a sports media career. He is a regular contributor to Denver Magazine's SportsBook blog.
