= Aaron Brown (running back) =

American football player (born 1985)

No. 21, 35, 15
- Positions: Running back, return specialist

Personal information
- Born: October 10, 1985 (age 41); Katy, Texas, U.S.
- Listed height: 6 ft 1 in (1.85 m)
- Listed weight: 210 lb (95 kg)

Career information
- High school: Mayde Creek (Houston, Texas)
- College: TCU
- NFL draft: 2009: 6th round, 192nd overall pick

Career history
- Detroit Lions (2009–2011); Cincinnati Bengals (2012)*; Sacramento Mountain Lions (2012)
- * Offseason or practice squad member only

Awards and highlights
- MW Freshman of the Year (2005); Second-team All-MW (2006)

Career NFL statistics
- Rushing yards: 189
- Rushing average: 4.2
- Receptions: 18
- Receiving yards: 138
- Receiving touchdowns: 1
- Return yards: 951
- Stats at Pro Football Reference

Aaron Brown (born October 10, 1985) is an American former professional football player who was a running back and return specialist in the National Football League (NFL). He was selected by the Detroit Lions in the sixth round of the 2009 NFL draft. He played college football for the TCU Horned Frogs. He recorded a 10.45 100-meter dash time on the track, one of the fastest prep times in the nation in 2004.

== College career ==
Brown made an immediate impact at Texas Christian University. In his first game as a true freshman in 2005, he ran for 163 yards in a nationally televised game against Utah. For the year, he rushed for 758 yards and six touchdowns, as well as three receiving touchdowns. His efforts helped the Horned Frogs win the Mountain West Conference championship in their first year as members of the conference, and Brown himself was named MWC Freshman of the Year.

As a sophomore in 2006, Brown led TCU with 801 rush yards and nine touchdowns, and was the team's second-leading receiver with 34 receptions for 455 yards and one touchdown. His 84-yard touchdown reception against Baylor put the Frogs ahead for good in what was their third consecutive victory over teams from the Big 12 Conference. He was named Second-team All-MWC.

Before his junior year in 2007, Brown was named Preseason MWC Offensive Player of the Year.

== Professional career ==
=== Detroit Lions ===
He was selected in the sixth round by the Detroit Lions in the 2009 NFL draft. During his first NFL pre-season game, Brown scored two touchdowns, in the victory against the Atlanta Falcons.

On September 4, 2011, he was waived by the Lions. He was re-signed on November 28 and released again on December 27.

=== Cincinnati Bengals ===
Brown signed with the Cincinnati Bengals on February 17, 2012. He was waived on August 24, 2012.
