= John Beck (gridiron football) =

American football player (born 1981)

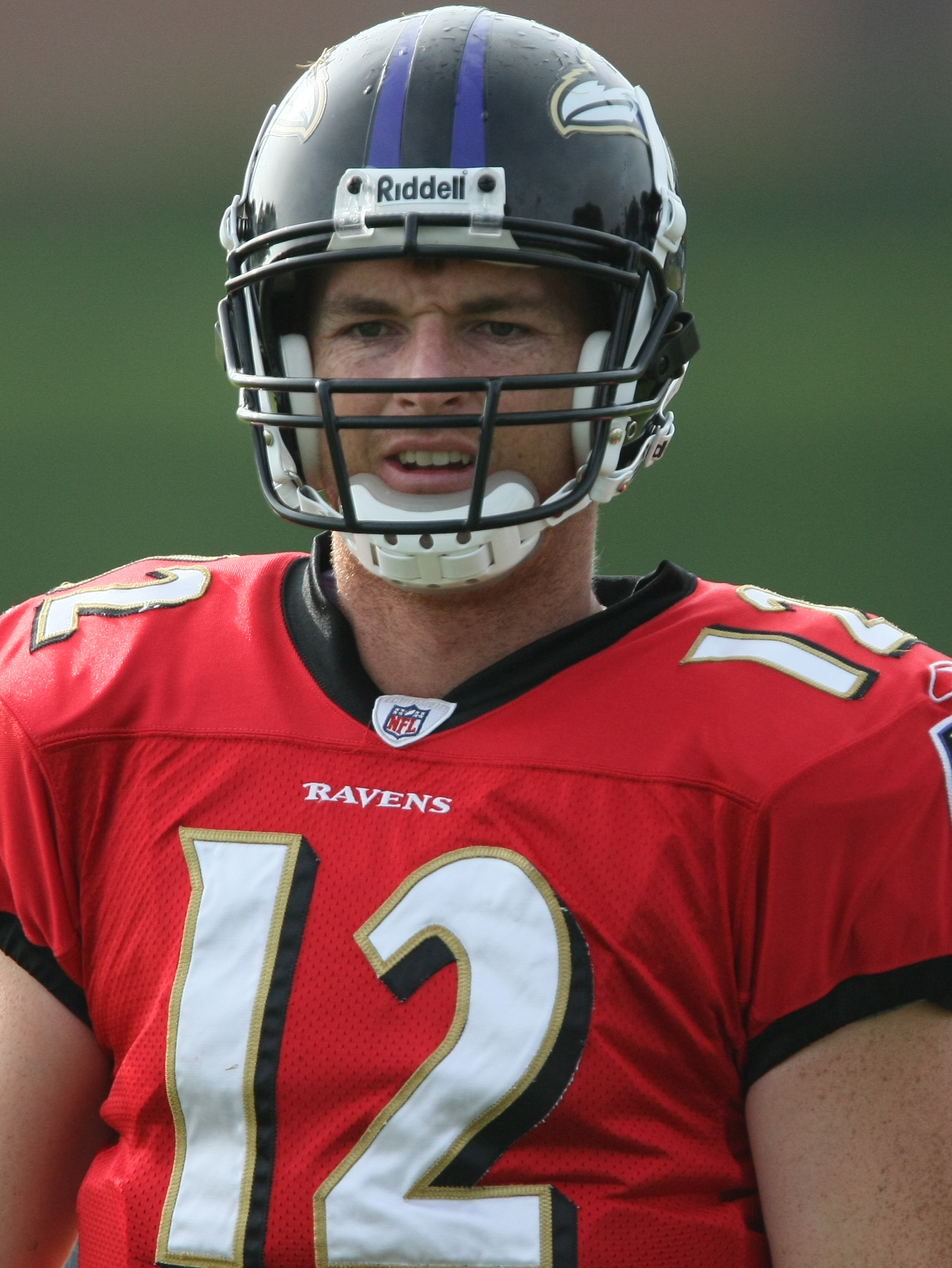
- Beck with the Baltimore Ravens in 2009

No. 9, 3, 12
- Position: Quarterback

Personal information
- Born: August 21, 1981 (age 45); Hayward, California, U.S.
- Listed height: 6 ft 2 in (1.88 m)
- Listed weight: 217 lb (98 kg)

Career information
- High school: Mountain View (Mesa, Arizona)
- College: BYU (2003–2006)
- NFL draft: 2007: 2nd round, 40th overall pick

Career history

Playing
- Miami Dolphins (2007–2008); Baltimore Ravens (2009); Washington Redskins (2010–2011); Houston Texans (2012); BC Lions (2014–2015)

Coaching
- New York Jets (2021) Offensive assistant

Awards and highlights
- Second-team All-American (2006); MW Offensive Player of the Year (2006); 2× First-team All-MW (2005, 2006); Second-team All-MW (2004)

Career NFL statistics
- Passing attempts: 239
- Passing completions: 140
- Completion percentage: 58.6%
- TD–INT: 3–7
- Passing yards: 1,417
- Passer rating: 67.6
- Rushing yards: 55
- Rushing touchdowns: 3
- Stats at Pro Football Reference
- Stats at CFL.ca (archive)

John Dalton Beck (born August 21, 1981) is an American former professional football player who was a quarterback for six seasons in the National Football League (NFL). He played college football for the BYU Cougars, and was selected by the Miami Dolphins in the second round of the 2007 NFL draft. He was also a member of the NFL's Baltimore Ravens, Washington Redskins, and Houston Texans, as well as the BC Lions of the Canadian Football League (CFL).

== Early life ==
John Beck was born August 21, 1981, in Hayward, California to Wendell Beck, a former track and field athlete at Brigham Young University, and Julie Beck. He first started playing football at eight years old.

Beck attended Mountain View High School in Mesa, Arizona. He was recruited by Brigham Young University, Arizona State, and Miami. He received Outstanding Male Scholar Athlete honors at Mountain View High School, a three-year letterman, and led Mountain View High School to a state championship as a senior. His overall record was 25–2 during his junior and senior seasons. Beck earned first-team all-region, first-team all-state, USA Today All-American honorable mention, and Dairyman first-team All-America honors. He was named the region Offensive Player of the Year and garnered first-team Super All-State and Super All-State Player-of-the-Year honors. Beck was further recognized as the Arizona High School Football Player of the Year and earned both the Ed Dougherty and Fred Enke Awards (Arizona Quarterback of the Year). During his senior year, he was named the MVP during the state championship game and selected as the Arizona All-Star game Most Valuable Player. Fox Sports recognized Beck as the Arizona 5A Player of the Year. Beck also currently holds the Arizona high school record with 42 touchdown completions in a single season with only 4 interceptions. Beyond football, Beck also lettered twice in baseball as a pitcher and an infielder. Beck is also an Eagle Scout.

== College career ==
Beck served a two-year mission for the Church of Jesus Christ of Latter-day Saints prior to his collegiate career, and in 2003, as a 22-year-old true freshman, he earned Academic All-Mountain West Conference (MWC) honors and competed in eight games, including four starts, becoming only the second true freshman to start at quarterback in BYU football history (vs. Stanford), completing 22-of-45 attempts for a season-high 279 yards against the Cardinals, including a season-long 56-yard bomb to Rodney Wilkerson. His first career victory occurred on October 4, leading the Cougars to a 44–36 win at San Diego State. He later saw action at fourth-ranked USC, completing one pass for 12 yards and carrying the ball four times for 29 yards.

While a sophomore, in 2004, Beck earned second-team All-Mountain West honors and started at quarterback in 10 of the Cougars' 11 games during the season. He broke the Mountain West Conference and BYU single-game record with 67 pass attempts against UNLV on October 8 and currently holds the MWC single-game sophomore record with 34 completions against UNLV. Beck averaged a MWC-best 261.0 yards per game against league opponents and averaged 233.0 yards per game against all opponents. He was named the MWC Offensive Player of the Week after leading the Cougars to a 41–24 win over Air Force. Against San Diego State, Beck posted BYU's highest quarterback rating since early in the 2001 season at 204.8. He also passed the 3,000-yard mark as a sophomore, ranking as the Cougars' third most prolific sophomore quarterback, while passing for at least one 50+ yard completion in six of eleven games.

As a junior, in 2005, Beck was an All-Mountain West Conference first-team selection, named Academic All-MWC and named team offensive MVP. He threw for a league-best 3,709 yards, marking the most yards by a BYU quarterback since Brandon Doman threw for over 3,500 yards in 2001. Beck was ranked fifth nationally with a league-best 309.1 yards-per-game average, including a league-high 517 yards in a loss to TCU on Sept. 24. Beck was twice named the MWC Offensive Player or the Week. He also set MWC single-game records with (i) 41 completions (vs. Boston College on September 3) and (ii) 517 yards passing (vs. TCU on September 24). He tied a MWC single-game record with five touchdowns (vs. TCU on September 24) and was ranked second all-time in the Mountain West with 7,136 career passing yards and first in the Mountain West with 3,709 yards in 2005. Beck was a 2005 Davey O'Brien Award candidate and rated as the top passing quarterback in the MWC by Street & Smith's. College Football News listed Beck as one of the top-30 players in the Mountain West Conference, while Phil Steele's College Football Preview ranked him as one of the top-40 quarterbacks in the country.

As a senior, in 2006, Beck was ranked as the second best quarterback in the country by ESPN as measured in quarterback efficiency ratings (173.27) and 5th best season leader in passing by CBS. He led BYU to a record of 10–2, with an 8–0 record in the Mountain West Conference. He was a finalist for the Davey O'Brien and Unitas Golden Arm Awards, and created buzz on the Heisman watch lists. One site that tracks college football had him #4 on the Heisman watch list. He was named the Walter Camp Football Foundation National Offensive Player of the week following the come-from-behind victory over Utah in the last game of the 2006 season.

On November 25, 2006, Beck led the Cougars to his first victory over in-state rival Utah Utes, and BYU's first in five years, by completing a touchdown pass to tight end Jonny Harline as time expired. With three seconds left on the clock, Beck dropped back, shuffled left, was pressured by a late blitzing linebacker, and then scrambled right (nearly 11 seconds in all) before throwing back across the field to Harline, who was standing alone in the end zone. Beck finished the game with 375 passing yards and 4 touchdowns.

Beck led the Cougars to their first bowl win since 1996, a 38–8 romp over the Oregon Ducks in the Las Vegas Bowl, at the end of the 2006 season. The win was made in large part because of Beck and tight end Jonny Harline. Beck totaled 375 yards and two scores and also had 26 yards and a touchdown on the ground. Harline, Beck's main target, was named the MVP after a 181-yard and 1 touchdown performance.

== Professional career ==
Pre-draft measurables
Height	Weight	Arm length	Hand span	40-yard dash	10-yard split	20-yard split	20-yard shuttle	Three-cone drill	Vertical jump	Broad jump
6 ft 2 1/8 in (1.88 m)	215 lb (98 kg)	31 3/4 in (0.81 m)	9 1/2 in (0.24 m)	4.77 s	1.63 s	2.71 s	4.17 s	6.81 s	29.5 in (0.75 m)	9 ft 3 in (2.82 m)
All values from NFL Combine

=== Miami Dolphins ===
The Miami Dolphins selected Beck with the 40th overall pick in the second round of the 2007 NFL draft; he was the fourth quarterback drafted, behind JaMarcus Russell, Brady Quinn, and Kevin Kolb. The Dolphins then signed Beck to a four-year contract with nearly $3.25 million in guaranteed money and incentives making it worth up to $4.5 million and $6.5 million total over four years. Beck was the team's third-string quarterback during his first training camp and held the role to begin the 2007 season. Despite being the third-string quarterback, he was seen as a potential successor to incumbent starter Trent Green.

With an injury to Green and inconsistent play from backup quarterback Cleo Lemon, the Dolphins struggled to an 0–8 start to the season. With the team on a bye week in Week 9, head coach Cam Cameron announced that Beck would begin splitting reps with the first-team offense with Lemon in preparation for their Week 10 contest against the Buffalo Bills. On November 14, it was announced that Beck would assume the starting job, beginning with the team's Week 11 game at the Philadelphia Eagles on November 18.

Beck and the Dolphins lost to the Eagles 17–7, failing to score on offense. In the game, Beck went just 9-for-22 (40.9%) for 109 yards, however he was not sacked and committed no turnovers. Beck started in the following week 12 Monday Night match up against the Pittsburgh Steelers. The game was delayed by harsh weather, and featured unfavorable field conditions due to mud and water. The Dolphins defense held Ben Roethlisberger and the Steelers scoreless until the final seconds of the game. However, the Dolphins offense failed to produce points and Beck was the victim to an early fourth quarter strip sack by James Harrison. John passed for 132 yards without a touchdown or interception, completing 14 of 23 passes in the loss. The Dolphins played against the New York Jets (who had a record of 2–9 at the time) in Week 13. Early on, the Dolphins defense managed the New York Jets. Joey Porter intercepted a Kellen Clemens pass in the second quarter, leading to a Jay Feely field goal. Later on in the quarter, after a Will Allen sack, Michael Lehan recovered a Kellen Clemens fumble for 43 yards and a touchdown. The Dolphins were up 13–10 by this time, due in part to Jay Feely's two field goals. However, once again Beck and the offense failed to score a touchdown for the duration of the game. John Beck completed just 23 of his 39 pass attempts for 177 yards, throwing three interceptions and losing a fumble. He was sacked three times, fumbling twice. Miami ended up losing the game 13–40. Overall throughout the season, Beck started just five games and lost all of them while the Dolphins finished the season with a 1–15 record.

With Lemon and Green leaving the team at the conclusion of the 2007 season, Beck was poised to assume a starting role for the 2008 season. However, the team opted to draft Chad Henne and sign Chad Pennington, which pushed Beck back to third on the depth chart.

After not playing the entire 2008 season, the Dolphins released Beck on April 27, 2009.

=== Baltimore Ravens ===
Beck was signed by the Baltimore Ravens on May 2, 2009. He re-signed with the team for the 2010 season. The move reunited him with Ravens offensive coordinator Cam Cameron, who was his head coach in Miami two years earlier. However, Beck again did not play a snap all year.

=== Washington Redskins ===
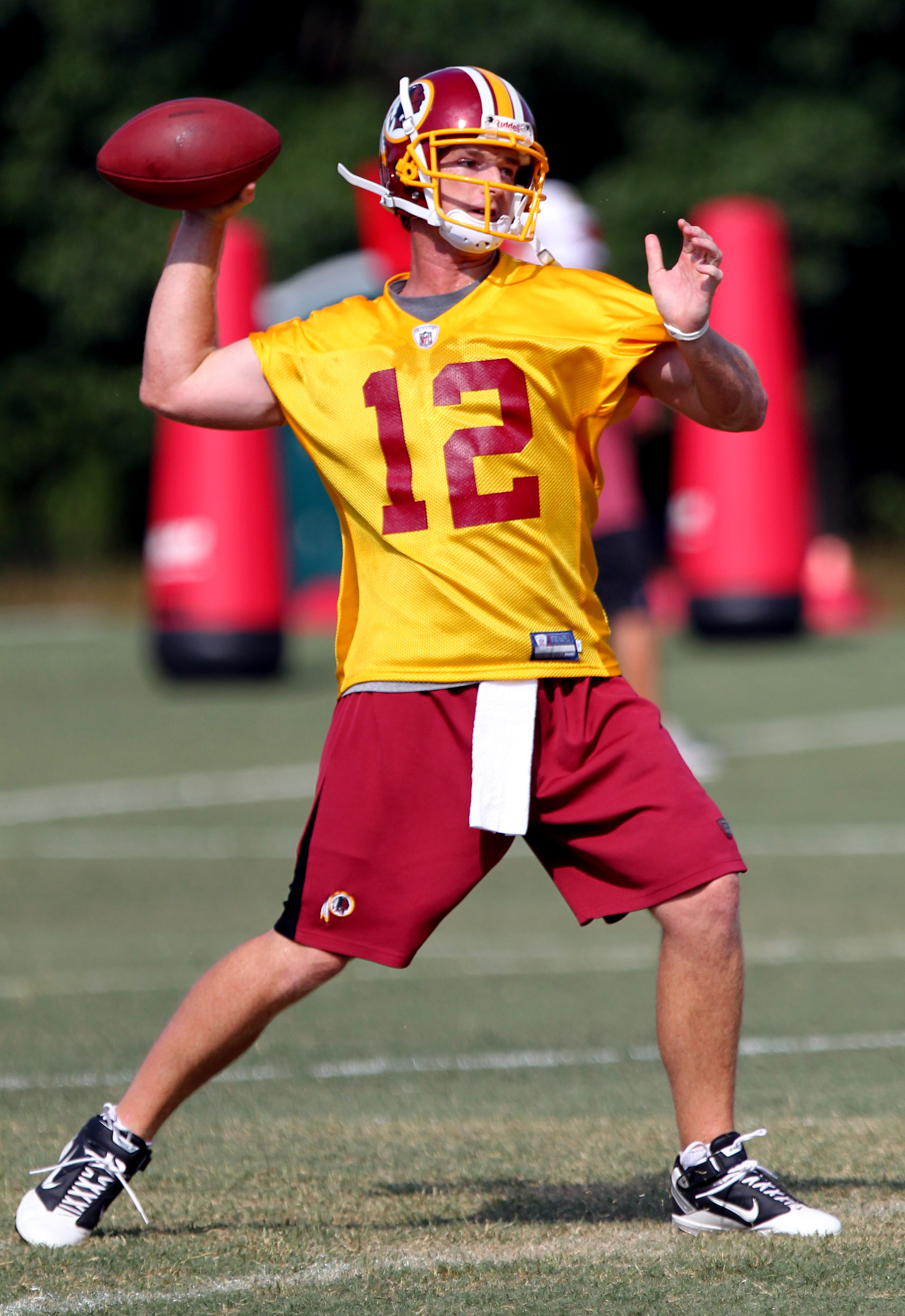
Beck at the Washington Redskins training camp in 2011

On August 2, 2010, Beck was traded to the Washington Redskins for Doug Dutch. On September 1, 2010, Beck signed a contract extension worth $2.25 million over two years, keeping him under contract with the Redskins through the 2012–2013 season.

Coach Mike Shanahan then announced that Beck, who had not played a game since his rookie season in 2007, would battle the incumbent Rex Grossman for the starting quarterback role in the 2011 season through training camp and preseason. Grossman was officially named the opening day starter just six days before the start of the season, leaving Beck as the backup for the fourth straight season in his career.

Beck made his first appearance for the Redskins on October 16, 2011, against the Philadelphia Eagles. On October 19, 2011, Redskins coach Mike Shanahan announced that Beck would start the upcoming week 7 game against the Carolina Panthers.

On November 13, 2011, Redskins coach Mike Shanahan announced that Grossman will be the starting quarterback for the Redskins, replacing Beck. On April 28, 2012, Beck was cut from the Redskins after the team drafted quarterbacks Robert Griffin III and Kirk Cousins.

=== Houston Texans ===
On May 9, 2012, Beck agreed to a deal with the Houston Texans. On October 3, he was released by the team to make room for safety Troy Nolan on the roster.

=== BC Lions ===
After being out of professional football for a year and a half, Beck signed with the BC Lions of the Canadian Football League (CFL) on March 4, 2014, to be the team's backup quarterback. In his first year in the CFL, Beck completed 19 of 41 pass attempts for 287 yards, with five touchdowns and no interceptions. He attempted at least one pass in eight games.

== Career statistics ==
=== Professional ===
Year	Team	League	Games		Passing								Rushing			
Year	Team	League	GP	GS	Cmp	Att	Pct	Yds	Avg	TD	Int	Rtg	Att	Yds	Avg	TD
2007	MIA	NFL	5	4	60	107	56.1	559	5.2	1	3	62.0	9	12	1.3	1
2008	MIA	NFL	0	0	DNP											
2009	BAL	NFL	0	0	DNP											
2010	WAS	NFL	0	0	DNP											
2011	WAS	NFL	4	3	80	132	60.6	858	6.5	2	4	72.1	10	43	4.3	2
2012	HOU	NFL	0	0	DNP											
2014	BC	CFL	18	0	19	41	46.3	287	7.0	5	0	109.5	21	30	1.4	3
2015	BC	CFL	10	2	50	79	63.3	498	6.3	4	4	76.9	3	32	10.7	0
NFL career			9	7	140	239	58.6	1,417	5.9	3	7	67.6	19	55	2.9	3
CFL career			28	2	69	120	57.5	785	6.5	9	4	88.4	24	62	2.6	3
Career			37	9	209	359	58.2	2,202	6.1	12	11	74.5	43	117	2.7	6

=== College ===
Year	Team	GP	Passing							
Year	Team	GP	Cmp	Att	Pct	Yds	Avg	TD	Int	QBR
2003	BYU	8	73	145	50.3	864	6.0	5	5	104.9
2004	BYU	11	192	343	56.0	2,563	7.5	15	8	128.5
2005	BYU	12	331	513	64.5	3,709	7.2	27	13	137.6
2006	BYU	12	289	417	69.3	3,885	9.3	32	8	169.1
Total		43	885	1,418	62.4	11,021	7.8	79	34	141.3

== Awards and honors ==
- 2× Academic All-Mountain West (2003, 2005)
- Second-team All-Mountain West (2004)
- BYU Cougars MVP (2005)
- 2× First-team All-Mountain West (2005–2006)
- Sporting News Mountain West Preseason Offensive Player of the Year (2006)
- Mountain West Conference Offensive Player of the Year (2006)
- Sporting News second-team All-American (2006)
- Davey O'Brien Award finalist (2006)
- Johnny Unitas Golden Arm Award finalist (2006)

== Coaching career ==
After his retirement from playing professional football, Beck co-founded, along with Tom House and Adam Dedeaux, the 3DQB quarterback training program in 2013 that takes place in Huntington Beach, California. Beck has worked with players such as Tom Brady, Matt Ryan, Drew Brees, Andy Dalton, Blake Bortles, Jared Goff, Matthew Stafford, Carson Wentz, Marcus Mariota, Trey Lance, Zach Wilson, Justin Fields and others. In October 2021, Beck contracted to work on-site as a New York Jets special assistant for quarterback mechanics and fundamentals for the remainder of starting quarterback Zach Wilson's rookie season.

== Personal life ==
Beck married Barbara Ann Burke of Ferron, Utah, in May 2004. The couple have four sons. He is an Eagle Scout. He is a devout member of the Church of Jesus Christ of Latter-day Saints; he served on a mission to Lisbon, Portugal, from 2000 through 2002 and speaks fluent Portuguese.
