= Spencer Toone =

American football player (born 1980)

No. 56
- Position: Linebacker

Personal information
- Born: August 25, 1980 (age 46); Idaho Falls, Idaho, U.S.
- Listed height: 6 ft 1 in (1.85 m)
- Listed weight: 238 lb (108 kg)

Career information
- College: Ricks College (1998–1999); Utah (2003–2006)
- NFL draft: 2006: 7th round, 245th overall pick

Career history

Playing
- Tennessee Titans (2006)

Coaching
- Utah State (2010–2012) (GA); Idaho State (2013–2017) (DC)

Awards and highlights
- First-team All-MW (2005)
- Stats at Pro Football Reference

Spencer William Toone II (born August 25, 1980) is an American former professional football linebacker who was selected by the National Football League Tennessee Titans in the last round of the 2006 NFL draft. He played college football at the University of Utah.

Pre-draft measurables
Height	Weight	40-yard dash	20-yard shuttle	Three-cone drill	Vertical jump	Broad jump	Bench press
6 ft 1 1/8 in (1.86 m)	235 lb (107 kg)	4.70 s	4.28 s	6.98 s	35.0 in (0.89 m)	9 ft 6 in (2.90 m)	22 reps
All values from Pro Day

== Early life ==
Toone attended Snake River High School in Blackfoot, Idaho, and was a student and a letterman in football, basketball, baseball and track. In football, he led his teams to two Idaho State Championships and was a two-time All-State selecion.
