= 2005 UNLV Rebels football team =

American college football season

2005 UNLV Rebels football
- Conference: Mountain West Conference
- Record: 2–9 (1–7 MW)
- Head coach: Mike Sanford Sr. (1st season)
- Offensive coordinator: Noah Brindise (1st season)
- Defensive coordinator: Vic Shealy (1st season)
- Home stadium: Sam Boyd Stadium

2005 Mountain West Conference football standings
	Conf.			Overall
Team	W		L	W		L
No. 11 TCU $	8	–	0	11	–	1
BYU	5	–	3	6	–	6
Colorado State	5	–	3	6	–	6
Utah	4	–	4	7	–	5
New Mexico	4	–	4	6	–	5
San Diego State	4	–	4	5	–	7
Air Force	3	–	5	4	–	7
Wyoming	2	–	6	4	–	7
UNLV	1	–	7	2	–	9
$ – Conference champion; Rankings from AP Poll

The 2005 UNLV Rebels football team represented the University of Nevada, Las Vegas (UNLV) as a member of the Mountain West Conference (MW) during the 2005 NCAA Division I-A football season. Led by first-year head coach Mike Sanford Sr., the Rebels compiled an overall record of 2–9 record with mark of 1–7 in conference play, placing last out of nine teams in the MW. The team played home games at Sam Boyd Stadium in Whitney, Nevada.

== Schedule ==
Date	Time	Opponent	Site	TV	Result	Attendance
September 5	10:00 a.m.	at New Mexico	University Stadium; Albuquerque, NM	ESPN2	L 22–24	37,533
September 10	7:00 p.m.	Idaho*	Sam Boyd Stadium; Whitney, NV		W 34–31	21,870
September 17	7:00 p.m.	at Nevada*	Mackay Stadium; Reno, NV (Fremont Cannon)	ESPNU	L 14–22	23,457
September 24	5:00 p.m.	at Utah State*	Romney Stadium; Logan, UT	SPW	L 24–31	12,408
October 1	12:00 p.m.	at Wyoming	War Memorial Stadium; Laramie, WY	SPW	L 17–42	18,022
October 8	12:00 p.m.	San Diego State	Sam Boyd Stadium; Whitney, NV	ESPN Plus	W 13–10	18,372
October 15	9:00 a.m.	at Air Force	Falcon Stadium; Colorado Springs, CO	SPW	L 7–42	30,573
October 22	4:00 p.m.	Utah	Sam Boyd Stadium; Whitney, NV	ABC	L 32–42	19,108
November 5	12:00 p.m.	BYU^{†}	Sam Boyd Stadium; Whitney, NV	ESPN Plus	L 14–55	23,677
November 12	4:00 p.m.	at No. 18 TCU	Amon G. Carter Stadium; Fort Worth, TX		L 3–51	28,035
November 19	1:00 p.m.	Colorado State	Sam Boyd Stadium; Whitney, NV		L 27–31	16,543
*Non-conference game; ^{†}Homecoming; Rankings from AP Poll released prior to the game; All times are in Pacific time
