= 2005 Emerald Bowl =

Georgia Tech Yellow Jackets	Utah Utes
(7–4)	(6–5)
ACC	Mountain West
10	38
Head coach: Chan Gailey	Head coach: Kyle Whittingham
AP / Coaches / BCS; 24 / 24 / 24
	1	2	3	4	Total
Georgia Tech	0	10	0	0	10
Utah	13	7	3	15	38
- Date: December 29, 2005
- Season: 2005
- Stadium: AT&T Park
- Location: San Francisco, California
- MVP: Offensive: Travis LaTendresse (Utah); Defensive: Eric Weddle (Utah)
- Referee: Nick Define (MAC)
- Attendance: 25,742

United States TV coverage
- Network: ESPN
- Announcers: Pam Ward, David Norrie, and Duke Castiglione

The 2005 Emerald Bowl, part of the 2005–06 NCAA bowl game season, was played on December 29, 2005, at AT&T Park in San Francisco, California. It featured the Georgia Tech Yellow Jackets, and the Utah Utes.

== Game summary ==
- Utah - Travis LaTendresse 14-yard touchdown pass from Brett Ratliff (Dan Beardall kick failed)
- Utah - Travis LaTendresse 23-yard touchdown pass from Brett Ratliff (Dan Beardall kick)
- Utah - Travis LaTendresse 25-yard touchdown pass from Brett Ratliff (Dan Beardall kick)
- Georgia Tech - George Cooper 31-yard touchdown pass from Reggie Ball (Travis Bell kick)
- Georgia Tech - Travis Bell 29-yard field goal
- Utah - Dan Beardall 23-yard field goal
- Utah - Travis LaTendresse 16 touchdown yard pass from Brett Ratliff (Travis LaTendresse pass from Brett Ratliff)
- Utah - Quinton Ganther 41-yard touchdown run (Dan Beardall kick)

Utah took a 6–0 lead with 12:26 left in the first quarter, following a 14-yard touchdown pass from Brett Ratliff to wide receiver Travis LaTendresse. With 3:59 left in the first quarter, Ratliff again found LaTendresse, this time for a 23-yard score, and Utah increased its lead to 13–0.

Just 30 seconds into the third quarter, Ratliff found LaTendresse for a third time, connecting on a 25-yard touchdown pass, as Utah opened up a 20–0 lead. Georgia Tech attempted to claw its way back in the game, after Reggie Ball threw a 31-yard touchdown pass to George Cooper, cutting Utah's lead to 20–7. With 3 seconds left in the half, Travis Bell kicked a 29-yard field goal, to make the halftime score 20–10 Utah.

In the third quarter, Dan Beardall added a 23-yard field goal, increasing Utah's lead to 23–10. With 11:44 left in the game, Ratliff found LaTendresse for the fourth time in the game, throwing a 16-yard touchdown pass, giving Utah a 31–10 lead. Quinton Ganther's 41-yard touchdown run sealed the deal, as Utah went on to win 38–10.
