= 2005 New Mexico Lobos football team =

American college football season

2005 New Mexico Lobos football
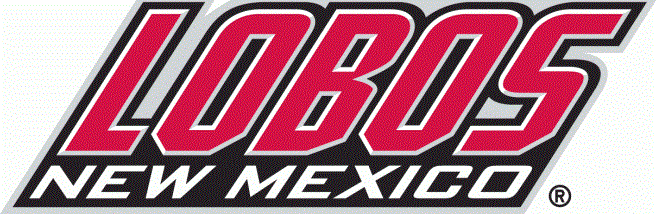
- Conference: Mountain West Conference
- Record: 6–5 (4–4 MW)
- Head coach: Rocky Long (8th season)
- Offensive coordinator: Dan Dodd (6th season)
- Offensive scheme: Multiple
- Defensive coordinator: Osia Lewis (3rd season)
- Base defense: 3–3–5
- Home stadium: University Stadium

2005 Mountain West Conference football standings
	Conf.			Overall
Team	W		L	W		L
No. 11 TCU $	8	–	0	11	–	1
BYU	5	–	3	6	–	6
Colorado State	5	–	3	6	–	6
Utah	4	–	4	7	–	5
New Mexico	4	–	4	6	–	5
San Diego State	4	–	4	5	–	7
Air Force	3	–	5	4	–	7
Wyoming	2	–	6	4	–	7
UNLV	1	–	7	2	–	9
$ – Conference champion; Rankings from AP Poll

The 2005 New Mexico Lobos football team represented the University of New Mexico as a member of the Mountain West Conference (MW) during the 2005 NCAA Division I-A football season. Led by eighth-year head coach Rocky Long, the Lobos compiled an overall record of 6–5 with a mark of 4–4 in conference play, placing in a three-way tie for fourth in the MW. The team played home games at University Stadium in Albuquerque, New Mexico.

== Schedule ==
Date	Time	Opponent	Site	TV	Result	Attendance
September 5	11:00 am	UNLV	University Stadium; Albuquerque, NM	ESPN2	W 24–22	37,533
September 10	5:00 pm	at Missouri*	Faurot Field; Columbia, MO	SPW	W 45–35	50,701
September 17	6:00 pm	New Mexico State*	University Stadium; Albuquerque, NM (Rio Grande Rivalry)	SPW	W 38–21	44,760
September 24	7:05 pm	at UTEP*	Sun Bowl; El Paso, TX	CSTV	L 13–21	50,425
October 1	5:00 pm	at TCU	Amon G. Carter Stadium; Fort Worth, TX	SPW	L 28–49	32,251
October 8	6:00 pm	BYU^{†}	University Stadium; Albuquerque, NM	SPW	L 24–27	39,233
October 15	1:00 pm	at Wyoming	War Memorial Stadium; Laramie, WY	ESPN Plus	W 27–24	21,453
October 22	8:00 pm	at San Diego State	Qualcomm Stadium; San Diego, CA	SPW	W 47–24	26,670
October 28	6:00 pm	Colorado State	University Stadium; Albuquerque, NM	ESPN2	L 25–35	36,390
November 12	4:30 pm	at Utah	Rice–Eccles Stadium; Salt Lake City, UT		W 31–27	36,746
November 19	12:30 pm	Air Force	University Stadium; Albuquerque, NM		L 24–42	33,791
*Non-conference game; ^{†}Homecoming; All times are in Mountain time
