= Jimmie Kaylor =

American football player (born 1984)

No. 8
- Position: Punter

Personal information
- Born: August 16, 1984 (age 42); Denver, Colorado, U.S.
- Listed height: 6 ft 3 in (1.91 m)

Career information
- High school: Northglenn (CO)
- College: Colorado State University (2004–2007)

Awards and highlights
- First-team All-MW (2005); Second-team All-MW (2006)
- Stats at ESPN

James William Kaylor IV (born August 16, 1984) is an American former football punter who played at Colorado State University from 2004 to 2007. He ranked fourth nationally in punting average in 2005 and was named to the Sophomore All-America Team and the All-Mountain West Conference team. He also received a Coca-Cola Community All-American Award in 2007. He punted for over 7,500 yards during his career at Colorado State and ranks second in school history with an average of 44.0 yards per punt.

== Early life ==
Kaylor was born in Denver in 1984. He attended Northglenn High School in Northglenn, Colorado, where he played football, baseball, and basketball. He played quarterback in high school and led the team to three consecutive league titles. He was twice selected as an all-state player in baseball.

== College football ==
Kaylor was a punter for the Colorado State Rams football team from 2004 to 2007. He redshirted in 2003 and saw limited action in 2004.

As a sophomore in 2005, he punted 53 times for 2,400 yards, an average of 45.3 yards per game. His average led the Mountain West Conference and ranked fourth nationally. He also rated highly in hang time and punts placed inside the 20-yard line. At the end of the 2005 season, he was the only Colorado State player selected as a first-team player on the All-Mountain West Conference team. He was also named by College Football News to the Sophomore All-America Team and received honorable mention on the All-America teams selected by Sports Illustrated and College Football News.

As a junior in 2006, Kaylor punted 63 times for 2,754 yards, an average of 43.7 yards per punt. Through the first half of the 2006 season, Kaylor was "booming punts at a record pace" and ranked among the top five nationally in yards per punt. However, his punting distance and hang time were reduced in the second half of the season. For his community service efforts in working with local school children, he received a Coca-Cola Community All-American Award in April 2007.

As a senior in 2007, Kaylor punted 52 times for 2,244 yards, an average of 43.2 yards per punt. He ranked 18th nationally in yards per punt.

Kaylor was named a Preseason All-American in 2006 and 2007 by several publications. His career average of 44.0 yards per punt ranks second in Colorado State history, trailing only Mike Deutsch who averaged 44.3 yards per punt from 1974 to 1977.

== Professional football ==
In April 2008, Kaylor was signed by the Atlanta Falcons as an undrafted free agent immediately following the 2008 NFL draft. He was waived prior to the start of the 2008 NFL season.
