= Tom Craft =

American football player and coach (born 1953)

Biographical details
- Born: November 12, 1953 (age 72); Iowa City, Iowa, U.S.

Playing career
- 1972–1973: Monterey Peninsula
- 1975–1976: San Diego State
- Position: Quarterback

Coaching career (HC unless noted)
- 1977–1982: Palomar (QB/WR)
- 1983–1993: Palomar
- 1994–1996: San Diego State (OC/QB)
- 1997–2001: Palomar
- 2002–2005: San Diego State
- 2007–2009: Mt. San Antonio (assoc. HC/OC/QB)
- 2010–2024: Riverside City

Head coaching record
- Overall: 19–29 (college); 261–79–1 (junior college)

Accomplishments and honors

Championships
- 2 junior college (1991, 1993); 2 CCCAA / 3C2A (2019, 2023); 5 Mission Conference South Division (1989–1993); 4 Mission Conference Central Division (1998–2001); 2 Central East (2010–2011); 7 National Central (2013–2017, 2021–2022); 4 National Southern (2018–2019, 2023–2024)

Thomas Jay Craft (born November 12, 1953) is an American football coach and former quarterback, who served as the head coach of the Riverside City Tigers from August 2010 until his retirement in December 2024. He played college football at Monterey Peninsula and San Diego State. He then served as the head football coach Palomar from 1983 to 1993 and at San Diego State from 2002 to 2005.

Craft is the father of former UCLA quarterback Kevin Craft.

== Career ==
Craft graduated from Pacific Grove High School, in Pacific Grove, California, and thereafter played quarterback at San Diego State University.

After serving as an assistant coach at Palomar College from 1977 to 1982 and with the school openly questioning its commitment to football, he took over head coaching duties in 1983. After a pair of 4–6 seasons, the Comets' fortunes began to improve. By the time Craft left the San Marcos school for the Aztec coordinator's job in 1994, Palomar was coming off a three-year stretch of 31–2, had an offense ranked among the nation's top five for five consecutive years and was sporting two national championships. Craft returned to Palomar in 1997 and was the head coach from 1997-2001. At Palomar, Craft coached seven All-American quarterbacks: Duffy Daughtery, Scott Barrick, Brett Salisbury, Andy Loveland, Tom Luginbill, Greg Cicero, and Andy Goodenough. He compiled an overall record of 115–56 and three national junior college football championships at Palomar.

Craft served as the head football coach at San Diego State University from 2002 to 2005. Under his tenure, San Diego State developed a reputation of playing the tough teams well but lacked consistency and never had a winning season. In 2004, San Diego State lost to #17 Michigan 24–21 and in 2005, lost 24–21 to #20 TCU. San Diego State fired Craft at the end of the 2005 season.

Craft was the associate head coach and offensive coordinator at Mount San Antonio College in Walnut, California from 2007-2009. He served as the head football coach at Riverside City College in Riverside, California, from August 2010 until his retirement in December 2024.

== Head coaching record ==
=== College ===
Year	Team	Overall	Conference	Standing	Bowl/playoffs
San Diego State Aztecs (Mountain West Conference) (2002–2005)
2002	San Diego State	4–9	4–3	4th	
2003	San Diego State	6–6	3–4	5th	
2004	San Diego State	4–7	2–5	7th	
2005	San Diego State	5–7	4–4	6th	
San Diego State:		19–29	13–16		
Total:		19–29			

=== Junior college football ===
Year	Team	Overall	Conference	Standing	Bowl/playoffs
Palomar Comets (Mission Conference) (1983–1993)
1983	Palomar	4–6	1–5	6th	
1984	Palomar	4–6	2–6	T–7th	
1985	Palomar	6–4	4–4	T–3rd	
1986	Palomar	5–5	4–5	7th	
1987	Palomar	4–4–1	3–5–1	6th	
1988	Palomar	4–6	3–6 / 3–1	2nd (South)	
1989	Palomar	7–4	6–3	1st (South)	W Hall of Fame Bowl
1990	Palomar	7–4	4–0	1st (South)	W Hall of Fame Bowl
1991	Palomar	10–1	8–0	1st (South)	W Merced Elks Bowl
1992	Palomar	10–1	8–1 / 3–0	1st (South)	W Orange Country Classic
1993	Palomar	11–0	9–0 / 3–0	1st (South)	W San Francisco Community College Bowl
Palomar Comets (Mission Conference) (1997–2001)
1997	Palomar	6–5	5–5 / 3–3	T–3rd (Central)	
1998	Palomar	10–1	9–1 / 5–0	1st (Central)	W First Down Bowl
1999	Palomar	8–3	8–2 / 4–1	T–1st (Central)	L Shrine Potato Bowl
2000	Palomar	7–4	7–3 / 4–1	T–1st (Central)	L Southern California Bowl
2001	Palomar	10–2	7–1 / 5–0	1st (Central)	W Southern California Bowl, L CCCAA Championship
Palomar:		113–56–1	88–47–1		
Riverside City Tigers (Central East Conference) (2010–2011)
2010	Riverside City	10–1	5–0	1st	W Central Division Championship
2011	Riverside City	11–0	5–0	1st	
Riverside City Tigers (National Central Conference / League) (2012–2017)
2012	Riverside City	9–2	5–1	2nd	W Golden State
2013	Riverside City	10–2	6–0	1st	L SCFA Championship
2014	Riverside City	10–2	6–0	1st	L SCFA Championship / CCCAA Semifinal
2015	Riverside City	8–3	5–1	T–1st	L CCCAA Southern California Playoffs
2016	Riverside City	10–2	4–1	T–1st	L SCFA Championship
2017	Riverside City	10–2	4–1	T–1st	L SCFA Championship
Riverside City Tigers (National Southern League) (2018–2021)
2018	Riverside City	10–2	5–0	1st	L CCCAA/SCFA Championship
2019	Riverside City	13–0	5–0	1st	W CCCAA Championship
2020–21	No team—COVID-19				
Riverside City Tigers (National Central League) (2021–2022)
2021	Riverside City	10–3	5–0	1st	L CCCAA Championship
2022	Riverside City	12–1	5–0	1st	L CCCAA Championship
Riverside City Tigers (National Southern League) (2023–present)
2023	Riverside City	12–1	6–1	2nd	W 3C2A Championship
2024	Riverside City	10–2	7–0	1st	L SCFA Championship
Riverside City:		145–23	73–5		
Total:		261–79–1			
National championship Conference title Conference division title or championship game berth
