= 2005 San Diego State Aztecs football team =

American college football season

2005 San Diego State Aztecs football
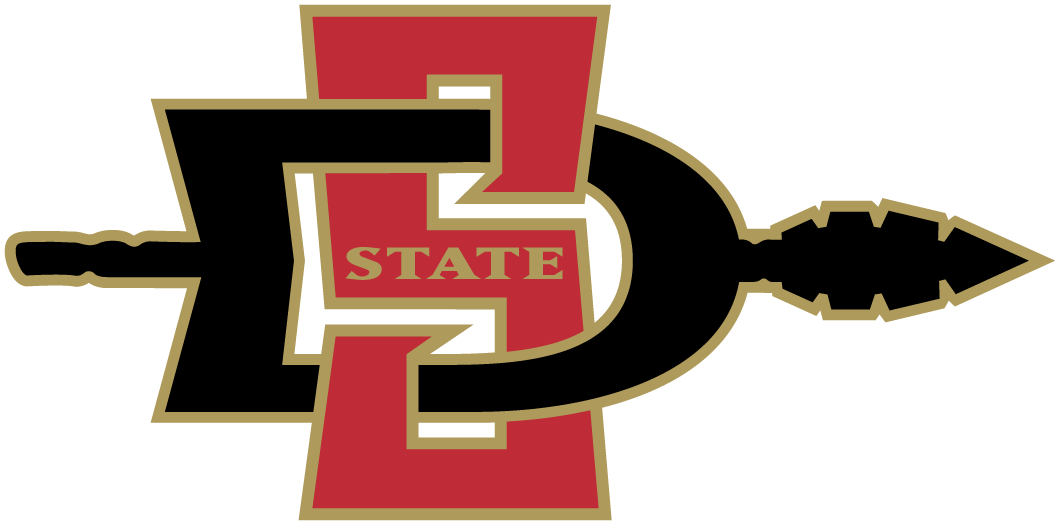
- Conference: Mountain West Conference
- Record: 5–7 (4–4 MW)
- Head coach: Tom Craft (4th season)
- Offensive scheme: Spread
- Defensive coordinator: Thom Kaumeyer (4th season)
- Base defense: 4–3
- Home stadium: Qualcomm Stadium

2005 Mountain West Conference football standings
	Conf.			Overall
Team	W		L	W		L
No. 11 TCU $	8	–	0	11	–	1
BYU	5	–	3	6	–	6
Colorado State	5	–	3	6	–	6
Utah	4	–	4	7	–	5
New Mexico	4	–	4	6	–	5
San Diego State	4	–	4	5	–	7
Air Force	3	–	5	4	–	7
Wyoming	2	–	6	4	–	7
UNLV	1	–	7	2	–	9
$ – Conference champion; Rankings from AP Poll

The 2005 San Diego State Aztecs football team represented San Diego State University in the 2005 NCAA Division I-A football season. The Aztecs, led by head coach Tom Craft, played their home games at Qualcomm Stadium.

== Schedule ==
Date	Time	Opponent	Site	TV	Result	Attendance
September 3	7:00 pm	UCLA*	Qualcomm Stadium; San Diego, CA	ESPN2	L 21–44	50,710
September 10	11:00 am	at Air Force	Falcon Stadium; Colorado Springs, CO	ESPN360	L 29–41	30,101
September 17	12:30 pm	at No. 9 Ohio State*	Ohio Stadium; Columbus, OH	ABC	L 6–27	104,533
September 24	5:00 pm	San Jose State*	Qualcomm Stadium; San Diego, CA	SPW	W 52–21	55,868
October 1	7:00 pm	BYU	Qualcomm Stadium; San Diego, CA	SPW	W 31–10	41,680
October 8	12:00 pm	at UNLV	Sam Boyd Stadium; Whitney, NV	ESPN Plus	L 10–13	18,372
October 15	4:00 pm	at Utah	Rice–Eccles Stadium; Salt Lake City, UT	ABC	W 28–19	41,341
October 22	7:00 pm	New Mexico	Qualcomm Stadium; San Diego, CA	SPW	L 24–47	26,670
October 29	5:00 pm	No. 20 TCU	Qualcomm Stadium; San Diego, CA	ESPN360	L 20–23	21,698
November 12	12:00 pm	at Colorado State	Hughes Stadium; Fort Collins, CO	ESPN+	W 30–10	25,411
November 19	5:00 pm	Wyoming	Qualcomm Stadium; San Diego, CA	SPW	W 34–21	20,713
December 3	8:05 pm	at Hawaii*	Aloha Stadium; Halawa, HI		L 38–49	28,326
*Non-conference game; Rankings from AP Poll released prior to the game; All times are in Pacific time
