= Greg Estandia =

American football player (born 1982)

No. 83
- Position: Tight end

Personal information
- Born: November 18, 1982 (age 43); Moorpark, California, U.S.
- Listed height: 6 ft 8 in (2.03 m)
- Listed weight: 265 lb (120 kg)

Career information
- College: UNLV
- NFL draft: 2006: undrafted

Career history
- Cincinnati Bengals (2006)*; Jacksonville Jaguars (2006–2009); Cleveland Browns (2009–2010)
- * Offseason or practice squad member only

Awards and highlights
- Second-team All-MW (2005)

Career NFL statistics
- Receptions: 23
- Receiving yards: 294
- Stats at Pro Football Reference

Greg Estandia (born November 18, 1982) is an American former professional football player who was a tight end in the National Football League (NFL). He played college football for the UNLV Rebels and was signed by the Cincinnati Bengals as an undrafted free agent in 2006.

Estandia has also played for the Jacksonville Jaguars.
