= 2005 TCU Horned Frogs football team =

American college football season

2005 TCU Horned Frogs football

Mountain West champion Houston Bowl champion

Houston Bowl, W 27–24 vs. Iowa State
- Conference: Mountain West Conference

Ranking
- Coaches: No. 9
- AP: No. 11
- Record: 11–1 (8–0 MW)
- Head coach: Gary Patterson (5th season)
- Offensive coordinator: Mike Schultz (8th season)
- Offensive scheme: Spread
- Defensive coordinator: Dick Bumpas (2nd season)
- Base defense: 4–2–5
- Home stadium: Amon G. Carter Stadium

2005 Mountain West Conference football standings
	Conf.			Overall
Team	W		L	W		L
No. 11 TCU $	8	–	0	11	–	1
BYU	5	–	3	6	–	6
Colorado State	5	–	3	6	–	6
Utah	4	–	4	7	–	5
New Mexico	4	–	4	6	–	5
San Diego State	4	–	4	5	–	7
Air Force	3	–	5	4	–	7
Wyoming	2	–	6	4	–	7
UNLV	1	–	7	2	–	9
$ – Conference champion; Rankings from AP Poll

The 2005 TCU Horned Frogs football team represented Texas Christian University in the 2005 NCAA Division I-A football season. TCU finished with an 11–1 (8–0 Mountain West Conference) record and a #11 ranking in the AP Poll.

The team was coached by Gary Patterson and played their home games at Amon G. Carter Stadium, which is located on campus in Fort Worth. TCU finished with a 27–24 victory over Iowa State in the 2005 Houston Bowl. This was TCU's first year in the Mountain West Conference (MWC), and they won their first MWC championship. It was TCU's first outright conference championship since 1958. The previous four years TCU competed in Conference USA.

== Schedule ==
Date	Time	Opponent	Rank	Site	TV	Result	Attendance
September 3	11:00 a.m.	at No. 7 Oklahoma*		Gaylord Family Oklahoma Memorial Stadium; Norman, OK	ABC	W 17–10	84,332
September 10	8:30 p.m.	at SMU*	No. 22	Ford Stadium; Dallas, TX (Battle for the Iron Skillet)	CSTV	L 10–21	22,416
September 15	6:30 p.m.	Utah		Amon G. Carter Stadium; Fort Worth, TX	ESPN	W 23–20 ^{OT}	25,220
September 24	2:00 p.m.	at BYU		LaVell Edwards Stadium; Provo, UT	ESPN+	W 51–50 ^{OT}	58,320
October 1	6:00 p.m.	New Mexico		Amon G. Carter Stadium; Fort Worth, TX	ESPNGP	W 49–28	32,251
October 8	2:00 p.m.	at Wyoming		War Memorial Stadium; Laramie, WY		W 28–14	27,723
October 15	6:00 p.m.	Army*^{†}	No. 25	Amon G. Carter Stadium; Fort Worth, TX		W 38–17	34,478
October 22	2:00 p.m.	at Air Force	No. 21	Falcon Stadium; Colorado Springs, CO	ESPN+	W 48–10	33,210
October 29	7:00 p.m.	at San Diego State	No. 20	Qualcomm Stadium; San Diego, CA	ESPN360	W 23–20	21,698
November 5	6:00 p.m.	Colorado State	No. 20	Amon G. Carter Stadium; Fort Worth, TX		W 33–6	36,284
November 12	6:00 p.m.	UNLV	No. 18	Amon G. Carter Stadium; Fort Worth, TX		W 51–3	28,035
December 31	1:30 p.m.	vs. Iowa State*	No. 14	Reliant Stadium; Houston, TX (Houston Bowl)	ESPN2	W 27–24	37,286
*Non-conference game; ^{†}Homecoming; Rankings from AP Poll released prior to the game; All times are in Central time

== Season summary ==
TCU started off the season with a 17–10 victory over #7 ranked Oklahoma. It was Oklahoma's first home loss since 2001 and the first September loss for Oklahoma since Bob Stoops became head coach. About the loss running back Adrian Peterson said, "Right now, I'm kind of shocked." TCU held Peterson to 63 yards rushing and Oklahoma to 225 yards of total offense.

On September 10, in the Battle for the Iron Skillet, TCU lost 21–10 to SMU. It was SMU's first victory over a ranked team since October 1, 1986. During the game, TCU had 4 turnovers to SMU's 1 turnover. TCU had beaten SMU six straight times before the loss. Placekicker Peter LoCoco missed three of his four field goal attempts during the game.

TCU beat Utah 23–20 in overtime on September 15 in a Thursday night game. The victory ended Utah's 18-game winning streak. TCU followed that game up with another overtime victory against BYU. TCU rallied from an 18-point deficit late in the third quarter to force overtime. With just under two minutes to go in the third quarter, BYU led 34–16, but TCU was able to outscore BYU 28–10 through the rest of regulation. In overtime, BYU missed an extra point attempt, after taking the lead on a touchdown. On TCU's ensuing possession, they managed to score a touchdown and score the conversion for the 51–50 victory.

After those back-to-back overtime contests, TCU won their next seven games by an average of 25 points. During the streak, TCU beat, in order, New Mexico, Wyoming, Army, Air Force, San Diego State, Colorado State, and UNLV.

The BCS eligibility guidelines were revised following this season. Had they been in force during this season, TCU would have received an automatic bid to a BCS bowl.

TCU finished the year with a 27–24 victory in the 2005 Houston Bowl over Iowa State. The victory extended the Horned Frogs' winning streak to ten games. Peter LoCoco made 44-yard field goal with 5:25 left in the game to break a 24–24 tie. After the game, LoCoco said, "This is perfect. This is redemption. I'm glad I got the opportunity. This was a big confidence booster." He had missed three kicks in TCU's loss to SMU.

TCU finished the year ranked #11 in the AP Poll and #9 in the Coaches' Poll, the only non-AQ conference team to be ranked in either final poll.

== Roster ==
2005 TCU Horned Frogs football team roster
Players
Coaches
Offense

Pos.	#	Name	Class
QB	14	Kyle Kummer	Jr
QB	15	Tye Gunn	Jr
QB	16	Jeff Ballard	So
WR	17	Cory Rodgers	So

Defense

Pos.	#	Name	Class
CB	11	Drew Coleman	Sr

Special teams

Pos.	#	Name	Class

Head coach

- Gary Patterson

Coordinators/assistant coaches

Legend

- (C) Team captain
- (S) Suspended
- (I) Ineligible
- Injured
- Redshirt

Roster
