= Naufahu Tahi =

American football player and coach (born 1981)

No. 38
- Position: Fullback

Personal information
- Born: October 30, 1981 (age 45); Fontana, California, U.S.
- Listed height: 6 ft 0 in (1.83 m)
- Listed weight: 254 lb (115 kg)

Career information
- High school: Granger (West Valley City, Utah)
- College: BYU (1999, 2002–2005)
- NFL draft: 2006: undrafted

Career history
- Cincinnati Bengals (2006)*; Minnesota Vikings (2006−2010); Jacksonville Jaguars (2012)*
- * Offseason or practice squad member only

Career NFL statistics
- Rushing attempts: 10
- Rushing yards: 21
- Receptions: 33
- Receiving yards: 150
- Receiving touchdowns: 2
- Stats at Pro Football Reference

Naufahu Anitoni Tahi (born October 30, 1981) is an American former professional football player who was a fullback in the National Football League (NFL). He was signed by the Cincinnati Bengals as an undrafted free agent in 2006. He played college football for the BYU Cougars. Tahi was also a member of the Minnesota Vikings and Jacksonville Jaguars.

== Early life ==
At Granger High School in West Valley City, Utah, Tahi was named the USA Today Player of the Year for Utah as a senior. Tahi rushed for a total of 5,700 yards and set a state record as the all-time leader in rushing yards and for rushing touchdowns.

== College career ==
Tahi attended Brigham Young University as a freshman in 1999 and led the team that year in rushing with 445 yards before taking a two-year leave for a mission in Jacksonville, Florida as he is a member of the Church of Jesus Christ of Latter-day Saints. Tahi returned to Brigham Young in 2003 and had a career-best 872 yards rushing from scrimmage as a senior and scored 8 touchdowns (6 rushing and 2 receiving).

== Professional career ==
=== Cincinnati Bengals ===
Tahi was an undrafted free agent out of college and signed with the Cincinnati Bengals in 2006, but was released on final roster cuts and became a member of the team's practice squad.

=== Minnesota Vikings ===
Tahi signed with the Minnesota Vikings on November 22, 2006, to their active roster from Cincinnati's practice squad.

Tahi saw his first significant playing time in 2008. During that year, he was listed number one on the Vikings depth chart and played several games at fullback blocking for Adrian Peterson as well as playing on special teams. He also had 16 receptions for 37 yards, most of which came on one-yard dumpoffs in the flat, a favorite play of Brad Childress and the West Coast Offense playbook.

Tahi signed a $1.4 million offer sheet March 19 with the Cincinnati Bengals, but the Vikings matched the offer and re-signed him on March 27.

Tahi caught his first touchdown pass of his career on January 3, 2010, in a win against the New York Giants. He was re-signed to a one-year contract on April 13.

=== Jacksonville Jaguars ===
On May 6, 2012, Tahi signed with the Jacksonville Jaguars. On July 27, Tahi left Jaguars training camp for personal reasons and was released later that day.

=== Coaching career ===
Tahi has served as an offensive analyst/asst running back coach and offensive administrative assistant at Utah State University.

== Personal life ==
Tahi was raised in a family that are natives of Tonga, but he was born in California before moving to Utah as a child. After retiring from football in 2012 Tahi became the running backs coach for Granger High School in West Valley City, Utah. Tahi graduated from Utah State University in 2016. He served as an analyst/assistant running back coach for the Utah State Aggies from 2013-2018. Tahi is married to Launatausala Purcell (2019). Together they have 10 children (Journey Tupea, Jordan Tupea, Jayda Tupea, Maile Tahi, Jaice Tupea, Lincoln Tahi, Jaden Tahi, Joscelynn Tupea, Takai Tahi, KobeSkye Tahi and Grandson Kendric Tupea)
