= 2005 Air Force Falcons football team =

American college football season

2005 Air Force Falcons football
- Conference: Mountain West Conference
- Record: 4–7 (3–5 MW)
- Head coach: Fisher DeBerry (22nd season)
- Offensive scheme: Wishbone triple option
- Defensive coordinator: Richard Bell (11th season)
- Base defense: 3–4
- Captains: Russ Mitscherling; Ross Weaver; Jon Wilson
- Home stadium: Falcon Stadium

2005 Mountain West Conference football standings
	Conf.			Overall
Team	W		L	W		L
No. 11 TCU $	8	–	0	11	–	1
BYU	5	–	3	6	–	6
Colorado State	5	–	3	6	–	6
Utah	4	–	4	7	–	5
New Mexico	4	–	4	6	–	5
San Diego State	4	–	4	5	–	7
Air Force	3	–	5	4	–	7
Wyoming	2	–	6	4	–	7
UNLV	1	–	7	2	–	9
$ – Conference champion; Rankings from AP Poll

The 2005 Air Force Falcons football team represented the United States Air Force Academy as a member of the Mountain West Conference (MW) during the 2005 NCAA Division I-A football season. Led by 22nd-year head coach Fisher DeBerry, the Falcons compiled an overall record of 4–7 with a mark of 3–5 in conference play, placing seventh in the MW. The team played home games at Falcon Stadium in Colorado Springs, Colorado.

== Schedule ==
Date	Time	Opponent	Site	TV	Result	Attendance
September 3	1:30 p.m.	at Washington*	Qwest Field; Seattle, WA	ABC	W 20–17	26,482
September 10	12:00 p.m.	San Diego State	Falcon Stadium; Colorado Springs, CO	ESPN360	W 41–29	30,101
September 17	12:00 p.m.	Wyoming	Falcon Stadium; Colorado Springs, CO		L 28–29	41,240
September 22	5:30 p.m.	at Utah	Rice–Eccles Stadium; Salt Lake City, UT	ESPN	L 35–38	41,935
September 29	5:30 p.m.	at Colorado State	Hughes Stadium; Fort Collins, CO (rivalry)	ESPN	L 23–41	26,711
October 8	11:30 a.m.	at Navy*	Navy–Marine Corps Memorial Stadium; Annapolis, MD (Commander-in-Chief's Trophy)	CSTV	L 24–27	35,211
October 15	10:00 a.m.	UNLV	Falcon Stadium; Colorado Springs, CO	SPW	W 42–7	30,573
October 22	1:00 p.m.	No. 21 TCU	Falcon Stadium; Colorado Springs, CO	ESPN Plus	L 10–48	33,210
October 29	1:00 p.m.	at BYU	LaVell Edwards Stadium; Provo, UT	ESPN+	L 41–62	57,687
November 5	1:30 p.m.	Army*	Falcon Stadium; Colorado Springs, CO (Commander-in-Chief's Trophy)	ESPN Classic	L 24–27	44,782
November 19	12:30 p.m.	at New Mexico	University Stadium; Albuquerque, NM		W 42–24	33,791
*Non-conference game; Rankings from AP Poll released prior to the game; All times are in Mountain time

== Roster ==
2005 Air Force Falcons football team roster
Players
Coaches
Offense

Pos.	#	Name	Class
QB		Shaun Carney	So
SB		Chad Hall	So

Defense

Pos.	#	Name	Class

Special teams

Pos.	#	Name	Class

Head coach

- Fisher DeBerry

Coordinators/assistant coaches

Legend

- (C) Team captain
- (S) Suspended
- (I) Ineligible
- Injured
- Redshirt
