= 2005 Wyoming Cowboys football team =

American college football season

2005 Wyoming Cowboys football
- Conference: Mountain West Conference
- Record: 4–7 (2–6 MW)
- Head coach: Joe Glenn (3rd season)
- Offensive coordinator: Billy Cockhill (3rd season)
- Offensive scheme: Multiple
- Defensive coordinator: Mike Breske (3rd season)
- Base defense: 3–4
- Home stadium: War Memorial Stadium

2005 Mountain West Conference football standings
	Conf.			Overall
Team	W		L	W		L
No. 11 TCU $	8	–	0	11	–	1
BYU	5	–	3	6	–	6
Colorado State	5	–	3	6	–	6
Utah	4	–	4	7	–	5
New Mexico	4	–	4	6	–	5
San Diego State	4	–	4	5	–	7
Air Force	3	–	5	4	–	7
Wyoming	2	–	6	4	–	7
UNLV	1	–	7	2	–	9
$ – Conference champion; Rankings from AP Poll

The 2005 Wyoming Cowboys football team represented the University of Wyoming as a member Mountain West Conference (MW) during the 2005 NCAA Division I-A football season. Led by third-year head coach Joe Glenn, the Cowboys compiled an overall record of 4–7 record with mark 2–6 in conference play, placing in a three-way tie for fourth in the MW. The team played home games at War Memorial Stadium in Laramie, Wyoming.

== Schedule ==
Date	Time	Opponent	Site	TV	Result	Attendance
September 3	4:00 pm	at No. 10 Florida*	Ben Hill Griffin Stadium; Gainesville, FL	PPV	L 14–32	90,707
September 10	1:00 pm	Louisiana–Monroe*	War Memorial Stadium; Laramie, WY		W 38–0	20,165
September 17	12:00 pm	at Air Force	Falcon Stadium; Colorado Springs, CO		W 29–24	41,240
September 24	5:00 pm	at Ole Miss*	Vaught–Hemingway Stadium; Oxford, MS		W 24–14	53,652
October 1	1:00 pm	UNLV	War Memorial Stadium; Laramie, WY	SPW	W 34–26	14,021
October 8	1:00 pm	TCU	War Memorial Stadium; Laramie, WY		L 14–28	27,723
October 15	1:00 pm	New Mexico^{†}	War Memorial Stadium; Laramie, WY	ESPN Plus	L 24–27	21,453
October 22	1:00 pm	at Colorado State	Hughes Stadium; Fort Collins, CO (Border War)	ESPNC	L 31–39	32,801
November 5	1:00 pm	at Utah	Rice–Eccles Stadium; Salt Lake City, UT		L 13–43	39,026
November 12	4:00 pm	BYU	War Memorial Stadium; Laramie, WY	SPW	L 21–35	15,889
November 19	6:00 pm	at San Diego State	Qualcomm Stadium; San Diego, CA	SPW	L 21–34	20,713
*Non-conference game; ^{†}Homecoming; Rankings from AP Poll released prior to the game; All times are in Mountain time
