= 2005 Hawaii Warriors football team =

American college football season

2005 Hawaii Warriors football
- Conference: Western Athletic Conference
- Record: 5–7 (4–4 WAC)
- Head coach: June Jones (7th season)
- Offensive scheme: Run and shoot
- Defensive coordinator: Jerry Glanville (1st season)
- Base defense: 3–4
- Home stadium: Aloha Stadium

2005 Western Athletic Conference football standings
	Conf.			Overall
Team	W		L	W		L
Boise State +	7	–	1	9	–	4
Nevada +	7	–	1	9	–	3
Louisiana Tech	6	–	2	7	–	4
Fresno State	6	–	2	8	–	5
Hawaii	4	–	4	5	–	7
San Jose State	2	–	6	3	–	8
Utah State	2	–	6	3	–	8
Idaho	2	–	6	2	–	9
New Mexico State	0	–	8	0	–	12
+ – Conference co-champions

The 2005 Hawaii Warriors football team represented the University of Hawaii at Manoa in the 2005 NCAA Division I-A football season. Hawaii finished the 2005 season with a 5–7 record, going 4–4 in WAC play. The losing record was the first for Hawaii since 2000 and the team did not play in a bowl game for the first time since 2002.

The 2005 season saw the addition of former Atlanta Falcons and Houston Oilers head coach Jerry Glanville as the team's defensive coordinator. The season began with a blowout road loss at Michigan State and a blowout home loss to Southern California. The season also included heartbreaking defeats at home to Boise State, Fresno State and Wisconsin, but concluded with a win against San Diego State.

== Schedule ==
Date	Time	Opponent	Site	TV	Result	Attendance
September 3	1:05 p.m.	No. 1 USC*	Aloha Stadium; Halawa, HI	ESPN2	L 17–63	50,000
September 10	9:30 a.m.	at Michigan State*	Spartan Stadium; East Lansing, MI	ESPNU	L 13–42	74,043
September 24	4:00 p.m.	at Idaho	Kibbie Dome; Moscow, ID	ESPNU	W 24–0	15,635
October 1	6:05 p.m.	Boise State	Aloha Stadium; Halawa, HI		L 41–44	31,695
October 8	1:00 p.m.	at Louisiana Tech	Joe Aillet Stadium; Ruston, LA		L 14–46	16,242
October 15	6:05 p.m.	New Mexico State	Aloha Stadium; Halawa, HI		W 49–28	29,002
October 22	12:00 p.m.	at San Jose State	Spartan Stadium; San Jose, CA (rivalry)		W 45–38	18,129
October 29	1:05 p.m.	No. 22 Fresno State	Aloha Stadium; Halawa, HI (rivalry)	ABC	L 13–27	28,196
November 5	11:05 a.m.	at Nevada	Mackay Stadium; Reno, NV		L 28–38	11,723
November 12	6:05 p.m.	Utah State	Aloha Stadium; Halawa, HI		W 50–23	27,892
November 25	4:05 p.m.	No. 24 Wisconsin*	Aloha Stadium; Halawa, HI	ESPN2	L 24–41	34,031
December 3	6:05 p.m.	San Diego State*	Aloha Stadium; Halawa, HI		W 49–38	28,326
*Non-conference game; Rankings from AP Poll released prior to the game; All times are in Hawaii–Aleutian time

== Roster ==
2005 Hawaii Warriors football team roster
Players
Coaches
Offense

Pos.	#	Name	Class
WR	7	Davone Bess	Fr
QB	15	Colt Brennan	So
OC	75	John Estes	Fr
WR	1	Ryan Grice-Mullen	Fr
RB	4	Nate Ilaoa	Sr
WR	88	Chad Mock	Jr
RB	19	Jayson Rego	Fr
G	64	Samson Satele	Jr

Defense

Pos.	#	Name	Class
LB	41	Solomon Elimimian	Fr
LB	44	Adam Leonard	Fr
DT	69	Reagan Maui'a	Jr
S	42	Leonard Peters	Sr
LB	47	Josh Rice	Fr
LB	13	Brashton Satele	Fr

Special teams

Pos.	#	Name	Class
LS	57	Jake Ingram	Fr

Head coach

- June Jones

Coordinators/assistant coaches

Legend

- (C) Team captain
- (S) Suspended
- (I) Ineligible
- Injured
- Redshirt

== Statistics ==
- QB Colt Brennan: 350/515 (68.0%) for 4,301 yards and 35 TD vs. 13 INT. 99 carries for 154 yards and 2 TD.
- RB Nate Ilaoa: 85 carries for 643 yards and 6 TD. 36 catches for 274 yards and 1 TD.
- WR Ryan Grice-Mullen: 85 catches for 1,228 yards and 12 TD.
- WR Davone Bess: 89 catches for 1,124 yards and 14 TD.
- WR Ross Dickerson: 51 catches for 725 yards and 4 TD.
- WR Chad Mock: 42 catches for 502 yards and 1 TD.
- WR Ian Sample: 12 catches for 172 yards and 1 TD.
- K Dan Kelly: 10/14 on field goals and 42/42 on extra points.
