= 2005 Nevada Wolf Pack football team =

American college football season

2005 Nevada Wolf Pack football
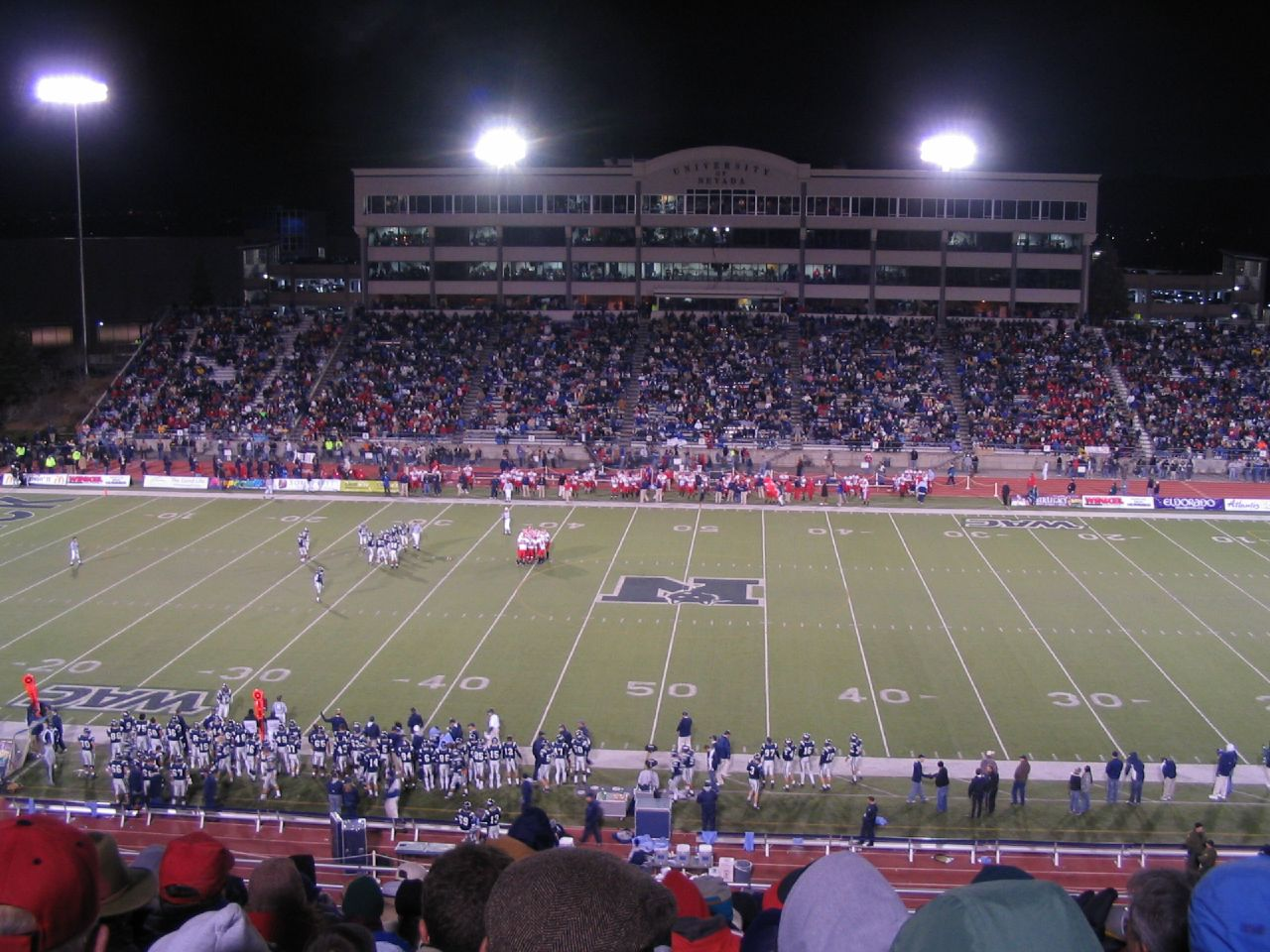
- Nevada on the field vs. Fresno State on November 26at Mackay Stadium

WAC co–champion Hawaii Bowl champion

Hawaii Bowl, W 49–48 ^{OT} vs. UCF
- Conference: Western Athletic Conference
- Record: 9–3 (7–1 WAC)
- Head coach: Chris Ault (21st season)
- Offensive coordinator: Chris Klenakis (5th season)
- Offensive scheme: Pistol
- Co-defensive coordinators: Tim DeRuyter (1st season); Barry Sacks (2nd season)
- Base defense: 3–4
- Home stadium: Mackay Stadium

2005 Western Athletic Conference football standings
	Conf.			Overall
Team	W		L	W		L
Boise State +	7	–	1	9	–	4
Nevada +	7	–	1	9	–	3
Louisiana Tech	6	–	2	7	–	4
Fresno State	6	–	2	8	–	5
Hawaii	4	–	4	5	–	7
San Jose State	2	–	6	3	–	8
Utah State	2	–	6	3	–	8
Idaho	2	–	6	2	–	9
New Mexico State	0	–	8	0	–	12
+ – Conference co-champions

The 2005 Nevada Wolf Pack football team represented the University of Nevada, Reno during the 2005 NCAA Division I-A football season. Nevada competed as a member of the Western Athletic Conference (WAC). The Wolf Pack were led by Chris Ault in his 21st overall and 2nd straight season since taking over as head coach for the third time in 2004. They played their home games at Mackay Stadium.

== Schedule ==
Date	Time	Opponent	Site	TV	Result	Attendance
September 9	7:00 p.m.	Washington State*	Mackay Stadium; Reno, NV	ESPN	L 21–55	17,552
September 17	7:00 p.m.	UNLV*	Mackay Stadium; Reno, NV (Fremont Cannon)	ESPNU	W 22–14	23,457
September 24	3:00 p.m.	at Colorado State*	Hughes Stadium; Fort Collins, CO	KREN-TV	L 21–42	29,101
October 1	4:00 p.m.	at San Jose State	Spartan Stadium; San Jose, CA	ABC	W 30–23	17,492
October 8	1:00 p.m.	Idaho^{†}	Mackay Stadium; Reno, NV	KREN-TV	W 62–14	11,584
October 15	1:00 p.m.	Louisiana Tech	Mackay Stadium; Reno, NV	KREN-TV	W 37–27	8,377
October 29	12:00 p.m.	at Boise State	Bronco Stadium; Boise, ID (rivalry)	KREN-TV	L 14–49	29,843
November 5	1:00 p.m.	Hawaii	Mackay Stadium; Reno, NV	KREN-TV	W 38–28	11,723
November 12	1:00 p.m.	at New Mexico State	Aggie Memorial Stadium; Las Cruces, NM	KREN-TV	W 48–24	7,345
November 19	12:00 p.m.	at Utah State	Romney Stadium; Logan, UT	KREN-TV	W 30–24	7,153
November 26	4:00 p.m.	No. 16 Fresno State	Mackay Stadium; Reno, NV	KREN-TV	W 49–41	17,765
December 24	5:30 p.m.	vs. UCF*	Aloha Stadium; Halawa, HI (Hawaii Bowl)	ESPN	W 49–48 ^{OT}	26,254
*Non-conference game; ^{†}Homecoming; Rankings from AP Poll released prior to the game; All times are in Pacific time

== Game summaries ==
=== Washington State ===
Washington State at Nevada

Team	1	2	3	4	Total
• Cougars	14	13	21	7	55
Wolf Pack	0	0	14	7	21

- Date: September 9, 2005
- Location: Mackay Stadium
  Reno, NV
- Game start: 7:06 p.m. PDT
- Elapsed time: 3 hours and 24 minutes
- Game attendance: 17,552
- Game weather: Temperature: 67 °F (19 °C) • Weather: Broken Sky • Wind: W 10–15 MPH
- Referee: Frank White
- TV announcers (ESPN): Dave Pasch, Rod Gilmore, Trevor Matich and Stacey Dales (sideline)

Scoring summary
1	03:13	WSU	Eric Frampton 36–yard interception (Loren Langley kick)	WSU 7–0
1	00:26	WSU	Troy Bienemann 18–yard pass from Alex Brink (Loren Langley kick)	WSU 14–0
2	09:51	WSU	Loren Langley 18–yard field goal	WSU 17–0
2	03:33	WSU	Jason Hill 6–yard pass from Alex Brink (Loren Langley kick)	WSU 24–0
2	00:22	WSU	Loren Langley 28–yard field goal	WSU 27–0
3	11:13	NEV	Caleb Spencer 21–yard pass from Jeff Rowe (Brett Jaekle kick)	WSU 27–7
3	10:27	WSU	Jason Hill 22–yard pass from Alex Brink (Loren Langley kick)	WSU 34–7
3	08:06	WSU	Michael Bumpus 87–yard punt return (Loren Langley kick)	WSU 41–7
3	04:36	WSU	Brandon Gibson 44–yard pass from Josh Swogger (Graham Siderius kick)	WSU 48–7
3	00:30	NEV	B.J. Mitchell 14–yard run (Brett Jaekle kick)	WSU 48–14
4	12:51	NEV	Robert Hubbard 3–yard run (Brett Jaekle kick)	WSU 48–21
4	07:12	WSU	DeMaundray Woolridge 1–yard run (Graham Siderius kick)	WSU 55–21

=== UNLV ===
UNLV at Nevada
(Battle for the Fremont Cannon)

Team	1	2	3	4	Total
Rebels	7	0	0	7	14
• Wolf Pack	9	0	3	10	22

- Date: September 17, 2005
- Location: Mackay Stadium
  Reno, NV
- Game start: 7:09 p.m. PDT
- Elapsed time: 3 hours and 29 minutes
- Game attendance: 23,457
- Game weather: Temperature: N/A • Weather: Mostly Clear • Wind: 5–10 MPH
- Referee: Karl Richins
- TV announcers (ESPNU): Beth Mowins and David Diaz-Infante

Scoring summary
1	09:58	NEV	Robert Hubbard 1–yard run (Brett Jaekle kick failed)	NEV 6–0
1	03:12	NEV	Brett Jaekle 25–yard field goal	NEV 9–0
1	02:01	UNLV	Shane Steichen 70–yard run (Sergio Aguayo kick)	NEV 9–7
3	02:35	NEV	Brett Jaekle 26–yard field goal	NEV 12–7
4	08:09	NEV	Brett Jaekle 22–yard field goal	NEV 15–7
4	02:33	NEV	Robert Hubbard 1–yard run (Brett Jaekle kick)	NEV 22–7
4	01:09	UNLV	Greg Estandia 16–yard pass from Shane Steichen (Sergio Aguayo kick)	NEV 22–14

=== At Colorado State ===
Nevada at Colorado State

Team	1	2	3	4	Total
Wolf Pack	0	7	7	7	21
• Rams	21	0	0	21	42

- Date: September 24, 2005
- Location: Hughes Stadium
  Fort Collins, CO
- Game start: 4:10 p.m. MDT
- Elapsed time: 3 hours and 13 minutes
- Game attendance: 29,101
- Game weather: Temperature: 70 °F (21 °C) • Weather: Clear • Wind: SE 1 MPH
- Referee: Bill McCabe
- TV announcers (KREN-TV): N/A

Scoring summary
1	12:31	CSU	Johnny Walker 26–yard pass from Justin Holland (Kevin Mark kick)	CSU 7–0
1	05:47	CSU	George Hill 23–yard pass from Justin Holland (Kevin Mark kick)	CSU 14–0
1	03:32	CSU	Tristan Walker 2–yard run (Kevin Mark kick)	CSU 21–0
2	09:35	NEV	B.J. Mitchell 8–yard pass from Jeff Rowe (Brett Jaekle kick)	CSU 21–7
3	02:47	NEV	Kyle Sammons 43–yard pass from Jeff Rowe (Brett Jaekle kick)	CSU 21–14
4	14:33	CSU	Kyle Bell 1–yard run (Kevin Mark kick)	CSU 28–14
4	06:43	CSU	Matt Bartz 6–yard pass from Justin Holland (Kevin Mark kick)	CSU 35–14
4	05:17	NEV	Jack Darlington 30–yard pass from Jeff Rowe (Brett Jaekle kick)	CSU 35–21
4	04:05	CSU	Damon Morton 40–yard run (Kevin Mark kick)	CSU 42–21

=== At San Jose State ===
Nevada at San Jose State

Team	1	2	3	4	Total
• Wolf Pack	13	7	0	10	30
Spartans	0	17	3	3	23

- Date: October 1, 2005
- Location: Spartan Stadium
  San Jose, CA
- Game start: 4:10 p.m. PDT
- Elapsed time: 3 hours and 20 minutes
- Game attendance: 17,492
- Game weather: Temperature: 77 °F (25 °C) • Weather: Clear Skies • Wind: N 13 MPH
- Referee: Paul Labenne
- TV announcers (ABC): Terry Gannon, Jamal Anderson and Dave LaMont (sideline)

Scoring summary
1	11:44	NEV	Kyle Sammons 16–yard pass from Jeff Rowe (Brett Jaekle kick failed)	NEV 6–0
1	00:00	NEV	B.J. Mitchell 13–yard run (Brett Jaekle kick)	NEV 13–0
2	14:10	NEV	Nick Hawthrone 40–yard interception (Brett Jaekle kick)	NEV 20–0
2	11:21	SJSU	John Broussard 19–yard pass from Adam Tafralis (Jared Strubeck kick)	NEV 20–7
2	10:01	SJSU	Jared Strubeck 44–yard field goal	NEV 20–10
2	00:13	SJSU	Rufus Skillern 28–yard pass from Adam Tafralis (Jared Strubeck kick)	NEV 20–17
3	03:14	SJSU	Jared Strubeck 27–yard field goal	TIE 20–20
4	08:51	NEV	Brett Jaekle 32–yard field goal	NEV 23–20
4	06:25	SJSU	Jared Strubeck 39–yard field goal	TIE 23–23
4	03:39	NEV	Robert Hubbard 25–yard pass from Jeff Rowe (Brett Jaekle kick)	NEV 30–23

=== Idaho ===
Idaho at Nevada

Team	1	2	3	4	Total
Vandals	0	6	0	8	14
• Wolf Pack	14	14	14	20	62

- Date: October 8, 2005
- Location: Mackay Stadium
  Reno, NV
- Game start: 1:05 p.m. PDT
- Elapsed time: 3 hours and 17 minutes
- Game attendance: 11,584
- Game weather: Temperature: 68 °F (20 °C) • Weather: Broken Clouds • Wind: NW 5–10 MPH
- Referee: Daniel Romeo
- TV announcers (KREN-TV): N/A

Scoring summary
1	09:59	NEV	B.J. Mitchell 4–yard run (Brett Jaekle kick)	NEV 7–0
1	06:07	NEV	B.J. Mitchell 7–yard run (Brett Jaekle kick)	NEV 14–0
2	06:12	NEV	Caleb Spencer 20–yard pass from Jeff Rowe (Brett Jaekle kick)	NEV 21–0
2	02:25	NEV	Adam Bishop 2–yard pass from Jeff Rowe (Brett Jaekle kick)	NEV 28–0
2	00:59	IDAHO	Daniel Smith 7–yard pass from Steven Wichman (Mike Barrow kick blocked)	NEV 28–6
3	13:37	NEV	B.J. Mitchell 56–yard run (Brett Jaekle kick)	NEV 35–6
3	07:53	NEV	B.J. Mitchell 7–yard run (Brett Jaekle kick)	NEV 42–6
4	12:32	NEV	Caleb Spencer 13–yard pass from Jeff Rowe (Alex Rosenblum kick failed)	NEV 48–6
4	07:57	NEV	Nick Hawthrone 90–yard fumble recovery (Brett Jaekle kick)	NEV 55–6
4	02:22	NEV	DeAngelo Wilson 47–yard interception (Brett Jaekle kick)	NEV 62–6
4	00:53	IDAHO	Wes Williams 31–yard pass from Steven Wichman (Wendell Octave pass)	NEV 62–14

=== Louisiana Tech ===
Louisiana Tech at Nevada

Team	1	2	3	4	Total
Bulldogs	7	14	0	6	27
• Wolf Pack	14	0	10	13	37

- Date: October 15, 2005
- Location: Mackay Stadium
  Reno, NV
- Game start: 1:05 p.m. PDT
- Elapsed time: 3 hours and 21 minutes
- Game attendance: 8,377
- Game weather: Temperature: 61 °F (16 °C) • Weather: Broken Clouds • Wind: NNW 15–25 MPH
- Referee: Bill Athan
- TV announcers (KREN-TV): N/A

Scoring summary
1	10:20	NEV	Nichiren Flowers 7–yard pass from Jeff Rowe (Brett Jaekle kick)	NEV 7–0
1	04:00	NEV	Tommy Haug 3–yard pass from Jeff Rowe (Brett Jaekle kick)	NEV 14–0
1	02:59	LATECH	Jonathan Holland 41–yard pass from Matt Kubik (Danny Horwedel kick)	NEV 14–7
2	09:14	LATECH	Eddie White 0–yard fumble recovery (Danny Horwedel kick)	TIE 14–14
2	02:32	LATECH	Freddie Franklin 1–yard run (Danny Horwedel kick)	LATECH 21–14
3	09:12	NEV	Jeff Rowe 31–yard run (Brett Jaekle kick)	TIE 21–21
3	01:39	NEV	Brett Jaekle 36–yard field goal	NEV 24–21
4	13:55	LATECH	Patrick Jackson 3–yard run (Danny Horwedel kick)	LATECH 27–24
4	09:39	NEV	Brett Jaekle 30–yard field goal	TIE 27–27
4	03:12	NEV	Brett Jaekle 21–yard field goal	NEV 30–27
4	00:51	NEV	Jeff Rowe 4–yard run (Brett Jaekle kick)	NEV 37–27

=== At Boise State ===
Nevada at Boise State
(rivalry)

Team	1	2	3	4	Total
Wolf Pack	0	7	0	7	14
• Broncos	7	14	21	7	49

- Date: October 29, 2005
- Location: Bronco Stadium
  Boise, ID
- Game start: 1:05 p.m. MDT
- Elapsed time: 3 hours and 25 minutes
- Game attendance: 29,843
- Game weather: Temperature: 50 °F (10 °C) • Weather: Sunny • Wind: NW 7 MPH
- Referee: Paul Labenne
- TV announcers (KREN-TV): N/A

Scoring summary
1	10:24	BSU	Jared Zabransky 1–yard run (Anthony Montgomery kick)	BSU 7–0
2	13:37	BSU	Legedu Naanee 1–yard pass from Jared Zabransky (Anthony Montgomery kick)	BSU 14–0
2	08:33	BSU	Jeff Carpenter 14–yard run (Anthony Montgomery kick)	BSU 21–0
2	02:10	NEV	Caleb Spencer 43–yard pass from Jeff Rowe (Brett Jaekle kick)	BSU 21–7
3	11:25	BSU	Antwaun Carter 6–yard run (Anthony Montgomery kick)	BSU 28–7
3	05:58	BSU	Ian Johnson 2–yard run (Anthony Montgomery kick)	BSU 35–7
3	03:56	BSU	Legedu Naanee 39–yard pass from Jared Zabransky (Anthony Montgomery kick)	BSU 42–7
4	12:40	BSU	Antwaun Carter 10–yard run (Anthony Montgomery kick)	BSU 49–7
4	00:35	NEV	Robert Hubbard 4–yard run (Brett Jaekle kick)	BSU 49–14

=== Hawaii ===
Hawaii at Nevada

Team	1	2	3	4	Total
Warriors	6	8	7	7	28
• Wolf Pack	7	10	7	14	38

- Date: November 5, 2005
- Location: Mackay Stadium
  Reno, NV
- Game start: 1:07 p.m. PST
- Elapsed time: 3 hours and 40 minutes
- Game attendance: 11,723
- Game weather: Temperature: 52 °F (11 °C) • Weather: Cloudy • Wind: N 3–5 MPH
- Referee: Bill McCabe
- TV announcers (KREN-TV): N/A

Scoring summary
1	03:17	UH	Nate Ilaoa 3–yard run (Dan Kelly kick blocked)	UH 6–0
1	00:03	NEV	Caleb Spencer 11–yard pass from Jeff Rowe (Brett Jaekle kick)	NEV 7–6
2	11:39	UH	Ross Dickerson 4–yard pass from Colt Brennan (Jordan Slye pass)	UH 14–7
2	04:05	NEV	Brett Jaekle 27–yard field goal	UH 14–10
2	02:11	NEV	B.J. Mitchell 30–yard run (Brett Jaekle kick)	NEV 17–14
3	11:04	NEV	Caleb Spencer 14–yard pass from Jeff Rowe (Brett Jaekle kick)	NEV 24–14
3	08:06	UH	Ryan Grice-Mullen 22–yard pass from Colt Brennan (Dan Kelly kick)	NEV 24–21
4	11:34	NEV	B.J. Mitchell 6–yard run (Brett Jaekle kick)	NEV 31–21
4	08:07	NEV	Jeff Rowe 2–yard run (Brett Jaekle kick)	NEV 38–21
4	06:52	UH	Davone Bess 24–yard pass from Colt Brennan (Dan Kelly kick)	NEV 38–28

=== At New Mexico State ===
Nevada at New Mexico State

Team	1	2	3	4	Total
• Wolf Pack	10	21	3	14	48
Aggies	0	10	0	14	24

- Date: November 12, 2005
- Location: Aggie Memorial Stadium
  Las Cruces, NM
- Game start: 2:00 p.m. MST
- Elapsed time: 3 hours and 35 minutes
- Game attendance: 7,345
- Game weather: Temperature: 69 °F (21 °C) • Weather: Sunny • Wind: W 7 MPH
- Referee: Daniel Romeo
- TV announcers (KREN-TV): N/A

Scoring summary
1	08:02	NEV	Brett Jaekle 29–yard field goal	NEV 3–0
1	03:26	NEV	Anthony Pudewell 10–yard pass from Jeff Rowe (Brett Jaekle kick)	NEV 10–0
2	13:08	NMSU	A.J. Harris 16–yard pass from Royal Gill (Conor Foley kick)	NEV 10–7
2	01:57	NEV	B.J. Mitchell 4–yard run (Brett Jaekle kick)	NEV 17–7
2	01:22	NEV	Caleb Spencer 64–yard pass from Jeff Rowe (Brett Jaekle kick)	NEV 24–7
2	00:36	NEV	Craig Bailey 40–yard fumble recovery (Brett Jaekle kick)	NEV 31–7
2	00:02	NMSU	Conor Foley 22–yard field goal	NEV 31–10
3	00:28	NEV	Brett Jaekle 29–yard field goal	NEV 34–10
4	13:58	NMSU	A.J. Harris 41–yard pass from Royal Gill (Conor Foley kick)	NEV 34–17
4	07:53	NEV	B.J. Mitchell 5–yard run (Brett Jaekle kick)	NEV 41–17
4	05:04	NMSU	A.J. Harris 43–yard pass from Royal Gill (Conor Foley kick)	NEV 41–24
4	02:20	NEV	Robert Hubbard 8–yard pass from Jeff Rowe (Brett Jaekle kick)	NEV 48–24

=== At Utah State ===
Nevada at Utah State

Team	1	2	3	4	Total
• Wolf Pack	7	7	9	7	30
Aggies	0	3	14	7	24

- Date: November 19, 2005
- Location: Romney Stadium
  Logan, UT
- Game start: 1:07 p.m. MST
- Elapsed time: 2 hours and 58 minutes
- Game attendance: 7,153
- Game weather: Temperature: 42 °F (6 °C) • Weather: Sunny • Wind: Calm
- Referee: Bill Athan
- TV announcers (KREN-TV): N/A

Scoring summary
1	10:48	NEV	Anthony Pudewell 14–yard pass from Jeff Rowe (Brett Jaekle kick)	NEV 7–0
2	10:39	USU	Justin Hamblin 31–yard field goal	NEV 7–3
2	08:11	NEV	Robert Hubbard 41–yard run (Brett Jaekle kick)	NEV 14–3
3	08:53	NEV	Jeff Rowe 3–yard run (Brett Jaekle kick failed)	NEV 20–3
3	08:40	USU	Tony Pennyman 99–yard kickoff return (Justin Hamblin kick)	NEV 20–10
3	05:58	NEV	Brett Jaekle 33–yard field goal	NEV 23–10
3	04:24	USU	Kevin Robinson 11–yard pass from Jerod Walker (Justin Hamblin kick)	NEV 23–17
4	06:57	NEV	Mike McCoy 30–yard pass from Jeff Rowe (Brett Jaekle kick)	NEV 30–17
4	06:07	USU	Tony Pennyman 34–yard pass from Jerod Walker (Justin Hamblin kick)	NEV 30–24

=== Fresno State ===
Fresno State at Nevada

Team	1	2	3	4	Total
Bulldogs	3	13	3	16	35
• Wolf Pack	10	14	0	14	38

- Date: November 26, 2005
- Location: Mackay Stadium
  Reno, NV
- Game start: 4:21 p.m. PST
- Elapsed time: 3 hours and 30 minutes
- Game attendance: 17,765
- Game weather: Temperature: 39 °F (4 °C) • Weather: Broken Clouds • Wind: 15–23 MPH
- Referee: Frank White
- TV announcers (KREN-TV): N/A

Scoring summary
1	10:41	NEV	Brett Jaekle 40–yard field goal	NEV 3–0
1	03:58	NEV	Jeff Rowe 10–yard run (Brett Jaekle kick)	NEV 10–0
1	02:40	FS	Kyle Zimmerman 34–yard field goal	NEV 10–3
2	14:31	NEV	Robert Hubbard 20–yard run (Brett Jaekle kick)	NEV 17–3
2	09:29	FS	Jermaine Jamison 5–yard pass from Paul Pinegar (Kyle Zimmerman kick)	NEV 17–10
2	06:29	NEV	Robert Hubbard 6–yard run (Brett Jaekle kick)	NEV 24–10
2	00:40	FS	Joe Fernandez 20–yard pass from Paul Pinegar (Kyle Zimmerman kick)	NEV 24–17
3	08:46	FS	Kyle Zimmerman 38–yard field goal	NEV 24–20
4	12:29	FS	Paul Williams 3–yard pass from Paul Pinegar (Jermaine Jamison pass)	FS 27–24
4	08:12	NEV	Robert Hubbard 13–yard run (Brett Jaekle kick)	NEV 31–27
4	01:29	NEV	Nichiren Flowers 12–yard pass from Jeff Rowe (Brett Jaekle kick)	NEV 38–27
4	00:54	FS	Matt Rivera 3–yard pass from Paul Pinegar (Joe Fernandez pass)	NEV 38–35

=== Vs. UCF ===
Nevada vs. UCF
(Hawaii Bowl)

Team	1	2	3	4	OT	Total
• Wolf Pack	7	21	0	14	7	49
Golden Knights	17	3	12	10	6	48

- Date: December 24, 2005
- Location: Aloha Stadium
  Halawa, HI
- Game start: 3:37 p.m.
- Elapsed time: 4 hours and 5 minutes
- Game attendance: 26,254
- Game weather: Temperature: 79 °F (26 °C) • Weather: Clear and Sunny • Wind: NE 5–10 MPH
- Referee: Scott Novak
- TV announcers (ESPN): Dave Barnett, Craig James and Suzy Shuster (sideline)

Scoring summary
1	13:20	UCF	Brandon Marshall 51–yard pass from Steven Moffett (Matt Prater kick)	UCF 7–0
1	09:24	UCF	Kevin Smith 78–yard run (Matt Prater kick)	UCF 14–0
1	08:33	NEV	Robert Hubbard 4–yard run (Brett Jaekle kick)	UCF 14–7
1	04:08	UCF	Matt Prater 47–yard field goal	UCF 17–7
2	11:32	NEV	B.J. Mitchell 1–yard run (Brett Jaekle kick)	UCF 17–14
2	07:37	NEV	B.J. Mitchell 1–yard run (Brett Jaekle kick)	NEV 21–17
2	05:01	NEV	Robert Hubbard 24–yard run (Brett Jaekle kick)	NEV 28–17
2	00:56	UCF	Matt Prater 38–yard field goal	NEV 28–20
3	08:19	UCF	Brandon Marshall 29–yard pass from Steven Moffett (pass failed)	NEV 28–26
3	01:51	UCF	Kevin Smith 3–yard run (Steven Moffett pass failed)	UCF 32–28
4	13:02	NEV	Robert Hubbard 5–yard run (Brett Jaekle kick)	NEV 35–32
4	03:18	NEV	Travis Branzell 7–yard pass from Jeff Rowe (Brett Jaekle kick)	NEV 42–32
4	01:32	UCF	Matt Prater 46–yard field goal	NEV 42–35
4	00:55	UCF	Brandon Marshall 16–yard pass from Steven Moffett (Matt Prater kick)	TIE 42–42
OT	15:00	NEV	Jeff Rowe 4–yard run (Brett Jaekle kick)	NEV 49–42
OT	15:00	UCF	Kevin Smith 19–yard run (Matt Prater kick failed)	NEV 49–48
