= 2005 USC Trojans football team =

American college football season

2005 USC Trojans football

Pac-10 champion (vacated)

Rose Bowl (BCS NCG), L 38–41 (vacated) vs. Texas
- Conference: Pacific-10 Conference

Ranking
- Coaches: No. 2
- AP: No. 2
- Record: 0–0, 12 wins 1 loss vacated (0–0 Pac-10, 8 wins vacated)
- Head coach: Pete Carroll (5th season)
- Offensive coordinator: Lane Kiffin (1st season)
- Offensive scheme: Multiple pro-style
- Base defense: 4–3
- Captains: Darnell Bing; Reggie Bush; Matt Leinart; Dallas Sartz
- Home stadium: Los Angeles Coliseum

2005 Pacific-10 Conference football standings
	Conf.			Overall
Team	W		L	W		L
No. 2 USC † $	8	–	0	12	–	1
No. 13 Oregon	7	–	1	10	–	2
No. 16 UCLA	6	–	2	10	–	2
No. 25 California	4	–	4	8	–	4
Arizona State	4	–	4	7	–	5
Stanford	4	–	4	5	–	6
Oregon State	3	–	5	5	–	6
Arizona	2	–	6	3	–	8
Washington State	1	–	7	4	–	7
Washington	1	–	7	2	–	9
$ – Conference champion; † – USC later vacated 12 wins (8 in conference) and 1 loss due to NCAA sanctions.; Rankings from AP Poll

The 2005 USC Trojans football team represented the University of Southern California in the 2005 NCAA Division I-A football season, winning the Pacific-10 Conference (Pac-10), and playing for the NCAA Division I-A national championship. The team was coached by Pete Carroll, led on offense by quarterback and 2004 Heisman Trophy winner Matt Leinart, and played its home games in the Los Angeles Coliseum.

With many of their starters returning, a highly ranked recruiting class, and a number one ranking before the season, the team had high expectations of repeating as national champions and planned on becoming the first FBS-equivalent team to three-peat as AP champions since Minnesota in 1936. They had nearly all of their offensive starters returning, although they had only two returning defensive starters from the previous year. The team went undefeated in the regular season with nine of their twelve wins by 17 points or more and were compared with the greatest teams in the history of college football. Once again ranked first in the Bowl Championship Series (BCS) rankings, they were invited to the national championship bowl game at the Rose Bowl, where they lost to the Texas Longhorns. With a final record of 12–1, they finished the season ranked second in the nation in both the Associated Press (AP) and Coaches' Polls.

A number of players from the team won national awards, with running back Reggie Bush becoming the school's seventh Heisman Trophy winner before it was later vacated due to a violation of NCAA rules. Bush would eventually have his 2005 Heisman Trophy Award, as well as his USC statistics, reinstated. Nevertheless, punishments which the NCAA enacted against USC still remain in effect. Following the season, Bush was selected second in the 2006 National Football League (NFL) draft and was followed by Leinart at tenth and nine other Trojans during the draft, with the team sending eleven players to the NFL that season.

On June 10, 2010, USC was forced to vacate two wins from the 2004 season, and all wins from the 2005 season, after an NCAA investigation into the football program (and men's basketball program) declared Bush retroactively ineligible. Additional sanctions included a bowl ban in 2010 and 2011, and the loss of 30 football scholarships (10 per year in 2010, 2011, and 2012). All official NCAA records show the Trojans as having a 0–0 record during the 2005 season, including the loss to Texas in the national championship being vacated.

== Before the season ==
The 2003 Trojans finished the season with a 12–1 record and shared the national title with the Louisiana State University (LSU) Tigers; USC won the Associated Press championship while LSU played for and won the BCS National Championship. The 2004 Trojans finished with a 13–0 record that included a win in the national championship game. The team became only the second team to be ranked first in the AP Poll from pre-season until the end of the season, and the tenth team to repeat as national champions. Returning fourteen starters from 2004, including Heisman Trophy-winning quarterback Matt Leinart, and with a 22-game winning streak, the Trojans were ranked at the top of the polls once again in the pre-season.

=== Coaching changes ===
After the 2004 season, four Trojan assistant coaches were offered and took jobs elsewhere. The most notable coach lost was offensive coordinator Norm Chow who took a job in the same position for the Tennessee Titans. Also leaving, were defensive line coach Ed Orgeron, who took the head coaching position at Ole Miss, quarterbacks coach Carl Smith, who became the offensive coordinator for the Jacksonville Jaguars, and offensive line coach Tim Davis who was hired by the Miami Dolphins. Carroll rebuilt his staff by elevating Ken Norton Jr. from graduate assistant to full-time assistant coaching the linebackers, and hiring Steve Sarkisian, who was with the Oakland Raiders in 2004 and was formerly with the Trojans, as quarterbacks coach. Pat Ruel, who was with the New York Giants in 2004, to coach the offensive line, and Jethro Franklin, who spent 2004 with the Green Bay Packers, as defensive line coach, Sarkisian would additionally be named as assistant head coach and Lane Kiffin, wide receivers coach, would add recruiting and offensive coordinating to his duties.

=== Roster changes ===
Although returning 14 starters from 2004, the team lost four players to the 2005 NFL draft and another to the supplemental draft. The four players taken in the regular draft were Mike Patterson, taken 31st by Philadelphia, Shaun Cody, taken in the second round by Detroit, Lofa Tatupu, taken in the second round by Seattle, and Matt Cassel, taken in the seventh round by New England Patriots. Additionally, Manuel Wright was taken in the supplemental draft as a fifth round selection by the Miami Dolphins.

=== Recruiting ===
The Trojans signed 19 recruits for the new class. Included in the top–10 class (ranked first by one source) were four five–star recruits on defense, two five–star recruits on offense, and another eight four–star recruits. Thomas Herring, who signed with the class, did not qualify for admission and sat out for the season, later enrolling in the school.

College recruiting (2005)
Name	Hometown	School	Height	Weight	40^{‡}	Commit date
Walker Ashley; DT	Eden Prairie, MN	Eden Prairie Senior	6 ft 4 in (1.93 m)	284 lb (129 kg)	4.89	Feb 2, 2005
Walker Ashley; DT	Recruit ratings: Scout: Rivals:					
Charles Brown; TE	Pomona, CA	Diamond Ranch HS	6 ft 6 in (1.98 m)	249 lb (113 kg)	5.01	Feb 2, 2005
Charles Brown; TE	Recruit ratings: Scout: Rivals:					
Luthur Brown; LB	Lakewood, CA	Lakewood HS	6 ft 3 in (1.91 m)	227 lb (103 kg)	4.63	Feb 2, 2005
Luthur Brown; LB	Recruit ratings: Scout: Rivals:					
Michael Coleman; QB	San Bernardino, CA	Arroyo Valley Hs	6 ft 2 in (1.88 m)	222 lb (101 kg)	4.5	Oct 14, 2004
Michael Coleman; QB	Recruit ratings: Scout: Rivals:					
Brian Cushing; LB	Oradell, NJ	Bergen Catholic HS	6 ft 4 in (1.93 m)	221 lb (100 kg)	4.51	Feb 2, 2005
Brian Cushing; LB	Recruit ratings: Scout: Rivals:					
Kevin Ellison; LB	Inglewood, CA	Redondo Union HS	6 ft 0 in (1.83 m)	214 lb (97 kg)	4.68	Dec 8, 2004
Kevin Ellison; LB	Recruit ratings: Scout: Rivals:					
Cary Harris; CB	Sherman Oaks, CA	Notre Dame HS	6 ft 1 in (1.85 m)	180 lb (82 kg)	4.4	Feb 2, 2005
Cary Harris; CB	Recruit ratings: Scout: Rivals:					
Will Harris; S	Covina, CA	Charter Oak HS	6 ft 3 in (1.91 m)	195 lb (88 kg)	4.55	Dec 11, 2004
Will Harris; S	Recruit ratings: Scout: Rivals:					
Thomas Herring; OT	Los Angeles, CA	Fremont HS	6 ft 6 in (1.98 m)	320 lb (150 kg)	4.8	Feb 2, 2005
Thomas Herring; OT	Recruit ratings: Scout: Rivals:					
Nick Howell; OL	Fresno, CA	Bullard HS	6 ft 5 in (1.96 m)	256 lb (116 kg)	5.13	Oct 16, 2004
Nick Howell; OL	Recruit ratings: Scout: Rivals:					
Kaluka Maiava; LB	Wailuku, HI	Baldwin HS	5 ft 11 in (1.80 m)	211 lb (96 kg)	4.63	Oct 11, 2004
Kaluka Maiava; LB	Recruit ratings: Scout: Rivals:					
Rey Maualuga; LB	Eureka, CA	Eureka Senior HS	6 ft 2 in (1.88 m)	244 lb (111 kg)	4.61	Jan 15, 2005
Rey Maualuga; LB	Recruit ratings: Scout: Rivals:					
Mozique McCurtis; CB	San Diego, CA	Grossmont	6 ft 1 in (1.85 m)	220 lb (100 kg)	4.37	Jun 2, 2005
Mozique McCurtis; CB	Recruit ratings: Scout: Rivals:					
Kyle Moore; DE	Warner Robins, GA	Houston County HS	6 ft 6 in (1.98 m)	248 lb (112 kg)	4.8	Feb 2, 2005
Kyle Moore; DE	Recruit ratings: Scout: Rivals:					
Mark Sanchez; QB	Mission Viejo, CA	Mission Viejo HS	6 ft 3 in (1.91 m)	213 lb (97 kg)	4.77	Jul 17, 2004
Mark Sanchez; QB	Recruit ratings: Scout: Rivals:					
Averell Spicer; DE	Rancho Cucamonga, CA	Rancho Cucamonga HS	6 ft 2 in (1.88 m)	262 lb (119 kg)	4.62	Dec 11, 2004
Averell Spicer; DE	Recruit ratings: Scout: Rivals:					
Kevin Thomas; CB	Oxnard, CA	Rio Mesa HS	6 ft 0 in (1.83 m)	172 lb (78 kg)	4.46	Dec 11, 2004
Kevin Thomas; CB	Recruit ratings: Scout: Rivals:					
Patrick Turner; WR	Nashville, TN	Goodpasture HS	6 ft 5 in (1.96 m)	210 lb (95 kg)	4.57	Jan 19, 2005
Patrick Turner; WR	Recruit ratings: Scout: Rivals:					
Troy Van Blarcom; K	Orange, CA	Lutheran HS	6 ft 3 in (1.91 m)	200 lb (91 kg)	4.8	Apr 26, 2004
Troy Van Blarcom; K	Recruit ratings: Scout: Rivals:					
Overall recruit ranking: Scout: #6 Rivals: #1
‡ Refers to 40-yard dash; Note: In many cases, Scout, Rivals, 247Sports, On3, and ESPN may conflict in their listings of height, weight and 40 time.; In these cases, the average was taken. ESPN grades are on a 100-point scale.; Sources: "2005USC Football Commitment List". Rivals.; "Scout.com Football Recruiting: USC". Scout.; "Scout.com Team Recruiting Rankings". Scout.; "2005 Team Ranking". Rivals.com.

=== Pre-season honors ===
Seven Trojan players were honored as part of pre-season watch lists for national awards.

- Darnell Bing – Bronko Nagurski Trophy, Lott Trophy, and Jim Thorpe Award
- Reggie Bush – Maxwell Award
- Dwayne Jarrett – Maxwell Award
- Ryan Kalil – Rimington Trophy
- Matt Leinart – Maxwell Award
- Steve Smith – Maxwell Award
- LenDale White – Maxwell Award

In addition to the awards, six players were honored on various pre-season All-America teams. Both Leinart and Bush were chosen by Playboy, Athlon, The Sporting News, Street & Smith, Phil Steele's, Lindy, and Blue Ribbon for their first teams. In addition, Playboy and Phil Steele chose Tom Malone to their first teams, Athlon chose Jarrett to its first team, and The Sporting News, Street and Smith, and Phil Steele chose Bing to their first teams. White was chosen to a number of third teams.

== Season ==
=== Schedule ===
Date	Time	Opponent	Rank	Site	TV	Result	Attendance
September 3	4:00 p.m.	at Hawaii*	No. 1	Aloha Stadium; Honolulu, HI	ESPN2	W 63–17 (vacated)	50,000
September 17	7:15 p.m.	Arkansas*	No. 1	Los Angeles Memorial Coliseum; Los Angeles, CA	FSN	W 70–17 (vacated)	90,411
September 24	4:00 p.m.	at No. 24 Oregon	No. 1	Autzen Stadium; Eugene, OR	ABC	W 45–13 (vacated)	59,129
October 1	12:30 p.m.	at No. 14 Arizona State	No. 1	Sun Devil Stadium; Tempe, AZ (College GameDay)	ABC	W 38–28 (vacated)	71,706
October 8	12:30 p.m.	Arizona	No. 1	Los Angeles Memorial Coliseum; Los Angeles, CA	FSN	W 42–21 (vacated)	90,221
October 15	12:30 p.m.	at No. 9 Notre Dame*	No. 1	Notre Dame Stadium; Notre Dame, IN (Jeweled Shillelagh) (College GameDay)	NBC	W 34–31 (vacated)	80,795
October 22	12:30 p.m.	at Washington	No. 1	Husky Stadium; Seattle, WA	ABC	W 51–24 (vacated)	64,096
October 29	12:30 p.m.	Washington State^{†}	No. 1	Los Angeles Memorial Coliseum; Los Angeles, CA	ABC	W 55–13 (vacated)	92,021
November 5	7:00 p.m.	Stanford	No. 1	Los Angeles Memorial Coliseum; Los Angeles, CA (rivalry)	TBS	W 51–21 (vacated)	90,212
November 12	12:30 p.m.	at California	No. 1	California Memorial Stadium; Berkeley, CA	ABC	W 35–10 (vacated)	72,981
November 19	7:15 p.m.	No. 16 Fresno State*	No. 1	Los Angeles Memorial Coliseum; Los Angeles, CA	FSN	W 50–42 (vacated)	90,007
December 3	1:30 p.m.	No. 11 UCLA	No. 1	Los Angeles Memorial Coliseum; Los Angeles, CA (Victory Bell) (College GameDay)	ABC	W 66–19 (vacated)	92,000
January 4, 2006	5:00 p.m.	vs. No. 2 Texas*	No. 1	Rose Bowl; Pasadena, CA (Rose Bowl) (College GameDay)	ABC	L 38–41‡	93,986
*Non-conference game; ^{†}Homecoming; Rankings from AP Poll released prior to the game; All times are in Pacific time

‡The Trojans loss in the Rose Bowl was also officially vacated.

=== Rankings ===
Ranking movements Legend: ██ Increase in ranking ██ Decrease in ranking ( ) = First-place votes
	Week															
Poll	Pre	1	2	3	4	5	6	7	8	9	10	11	12	13	14	Final
AP	1 (60)	1 (61)	1 (56)	1 (57)	1 (59)	1 (59)	1 (58)	1 (57)	1 (55)	1 (57)	1 (57)	1 (56)	1 (50)	1 (55)	1 (56)	2
Coaches	1 (60)	1 (60)	1 (59)	1 (60)	1 (60)	1 (60)	1 (57)	1 (54)	1 (53)	1 (56)	1 (56)	1 (57)	1 (49)	1 (53)	1 (55)	2
Harris	Not released				1 (110)	1 (108)	1 (100)	1 (96)	1 (95)	1 (96)	1 (97)	1 (94)	1 (88)	1 (99)	1 (99)	Not released
BCS	Not released							1	2	1	1	1	1	1	1	Not released

=== Game summaries ===
==== Hawaii ====
	1	2	3	4	Total
#1 Trojans	7	14	28	14	63
Warriors	3	0	7	7	17

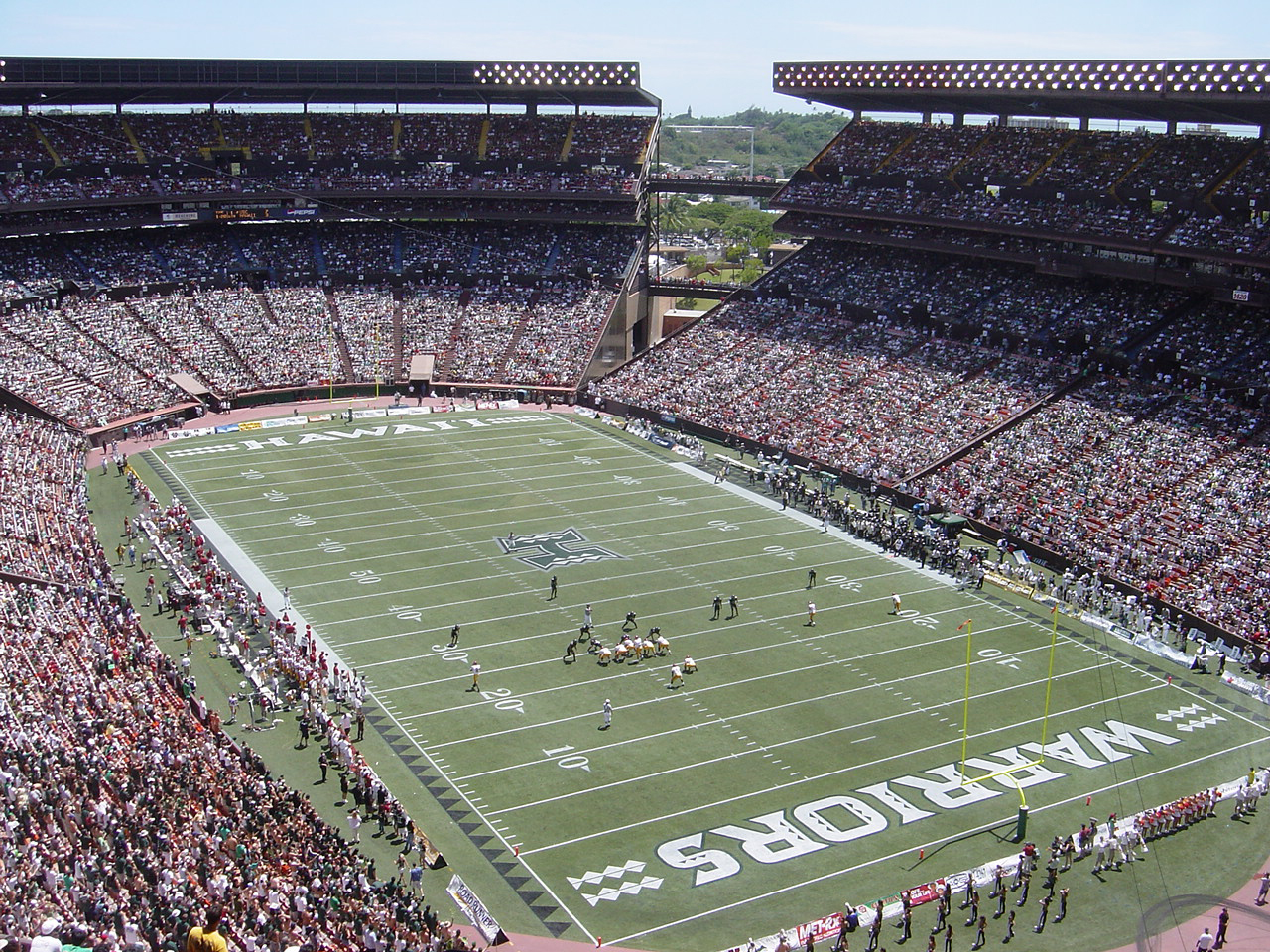
The Trojans kick off their season visiting the Warriors.

The Trojans began the season by traveling to Hawaii to face the Warriors led by sixth–year head coach June Jones and quarterback Colt Brennan, Leinart's backup in high school. The Trojans opened the scoring on a 65-yard interception return by Darnell Bing. The Warriors answered with a field goal, however the Trojans scored 14 points in the second quarter to take a 21–3 lead into half-time. After Leinart threw his second touchdown of the game to start the second half, Brennan was able to answer with his own touchdown pass to keep the deficit to 18, however, before the end of the quarter Leinart threw his third touchdown, Bush rushed for his second touchdown, and the Trojan defense returned a fumble for the fourth Trojan touchdown of the quarter. In the fourth quarter, most of the Trojan starters were out of the game, and backup quarterback John David Booty threw a touchdown to Dwayne Jarrett, his third touchdown catch of the game. Tyler Graunke threw a touchdown for the Warriors to bring them within 39, but backup running back Desmond Reed rushed for the last Trojan touchdown of the game to bring the final score to 63–17 and bringing the Trojans' win streak to 23 games.

==== Arkansas ====
	1	2	3	4	Total
Razorbacks	7	3	0	7	17
#1 Trojans	28	14	14	14	70

In the Trojans' first home game of the season they faced the Arkansas Razorbacks, led by eighth–year head coach Houston Nutt and quarterback Robert Johnson. Bush opened the scoring for the Trojans with a 76-yard rush. The Razorbacks answered with a touchdown pass by Johnson, however, Leinart scored three touchdowns, two passing and one rushing, before the end of the quarter. In the second quarter the Razorbacks were able to kick a field goal before the Trojans scored two more touchdowns on a rush by LenDale White and a third pass by Leinart. Going into the half the Trojans led 42–10. In the third quarter, White rushed for his second touchdown and Leinart threw a fourth before the Trojan starters were taken out of the game. Booty threw his second touchdown of the season in the fourth quarter before backup quarterback Alex Mortensen threw a touchdown for the Razorbacks. Third-string Trojan quarterback Mike McDonald threw a 4-yard touchdown to end the game, giving the Trojans a 70–17 win and a 24-game winning streak.

==== Oregon ====
	1	2	3	4	Total
#1 Trojans	0	10	21	14	45
Ducks	10	3	0	0	13

The Trojans next traveled to Eugene, Oregon to face the Ducks in both teams' conference opener. The Ducks, led by eleventh–year head coach Mike Bellotti and quarterback Kellen Clemens, came into the game undefeated, and started quickly with an early field goal. Later in the quarter, Clemens threw a touchdown and early in the second quarter another field goal gave the Ducks a 13–0 lead. Before the end of the half, Leinart threw a touchdown to Bush and a Mario Danelo field goal gave the Trojans a 13–10 deficit at the half. In the second half, the Trojans began an onslaught with two more Leinart touchdown passes, two LenDale White touchdown rushes, and a Bush rush for a touchdown. Scoring 45 straight points, the Trojans won the game 45–13 and extended their winning streak to 25 games and improved to 3–0 on the season as the Ducks fell to 2–1.

==== Arizona State ====
	1	2	3	4	Total
#1 Trojans	0	3	14	21	38
#15 Sun Devils	7	14	0	7	28

The Trojans next stayed on the road and faced the fifteenth–ranked Arizona State Sun Devils, led by fifth–year head coach Dirk Koetter and quarterback Sam Keller. With both offenses struggling in the first quarter, Sun Devil, Terry Richardson, opened scoring on an 84-yard punt return for a touchdown. The Trojans answered early in the second quarter with a field goal, however, two touchdowns, a Keller pass and a Keegan Herring rush, gave the Sun Devils an 18-point half-time lead. Starting in the third quarter the Trojans got on track with a pair of rushing touchdowns to bring their deficit to four, and midway through the fourth quarter they took the lead on a quarterback sneak by Leinart. Keller drove the Sun Devils to another touchdown to take back the lead, but two more rushing touchdowns by the Trojans, within a minute and a half, gave them the win, 38–28. Reggie Bush and LenDale White both ran for over 150 yards to help the Trojans win their Pac-10 record 26th consecutive game. Helping to seal the win for the Trojans were their defense who sacked Keller five times and caused him to throw five interceptions. Before the game, Keller, in his first year as a starter, had thrown for 2,165 yards in seven games.

==== Arizona ====
	1	2	3	4	Total
Wildcats	7	0	14	0	21
#1 Trojans	7	7	14	14	42

The Trojans next went home to face the Arizona Wildcats, led by second–year head coach Mike Stoops and quarterback Richard Kovalcheck. Though the Trojans were a 38.5 point favorite and took an early lead on a LenDale White rushing touchdown, the Wildcats answered after Kovalcheck threw his own touchdown and the game was tied at the end of the first quarter. Though both teams struggled in the second quarter, Leinart was able to complete a 22-yard touchdown to Dwayne Jarrett late in the half to take a 14–7 lead. In the third quarter, White rushed for two more touchdowns, however, Kovalcheck answered both times to keep the Wildcats within a touchdown going into the fourth quarter. Early in the fourth, Leinart threw his second touchdown to Jarrett and White rushed for a fourth touchdown to give the Trojans a 42–21 win. Both White and Bush rushed for over 100 yards for the third straight game, which was a school record, and the win increased the Trojan winning streak to 27 games.

==== Notre Dame ====
	1	2	3	4	Total
#1 Trojans	14	0	7	13	34
#9 Irish	7	14	0	10	31

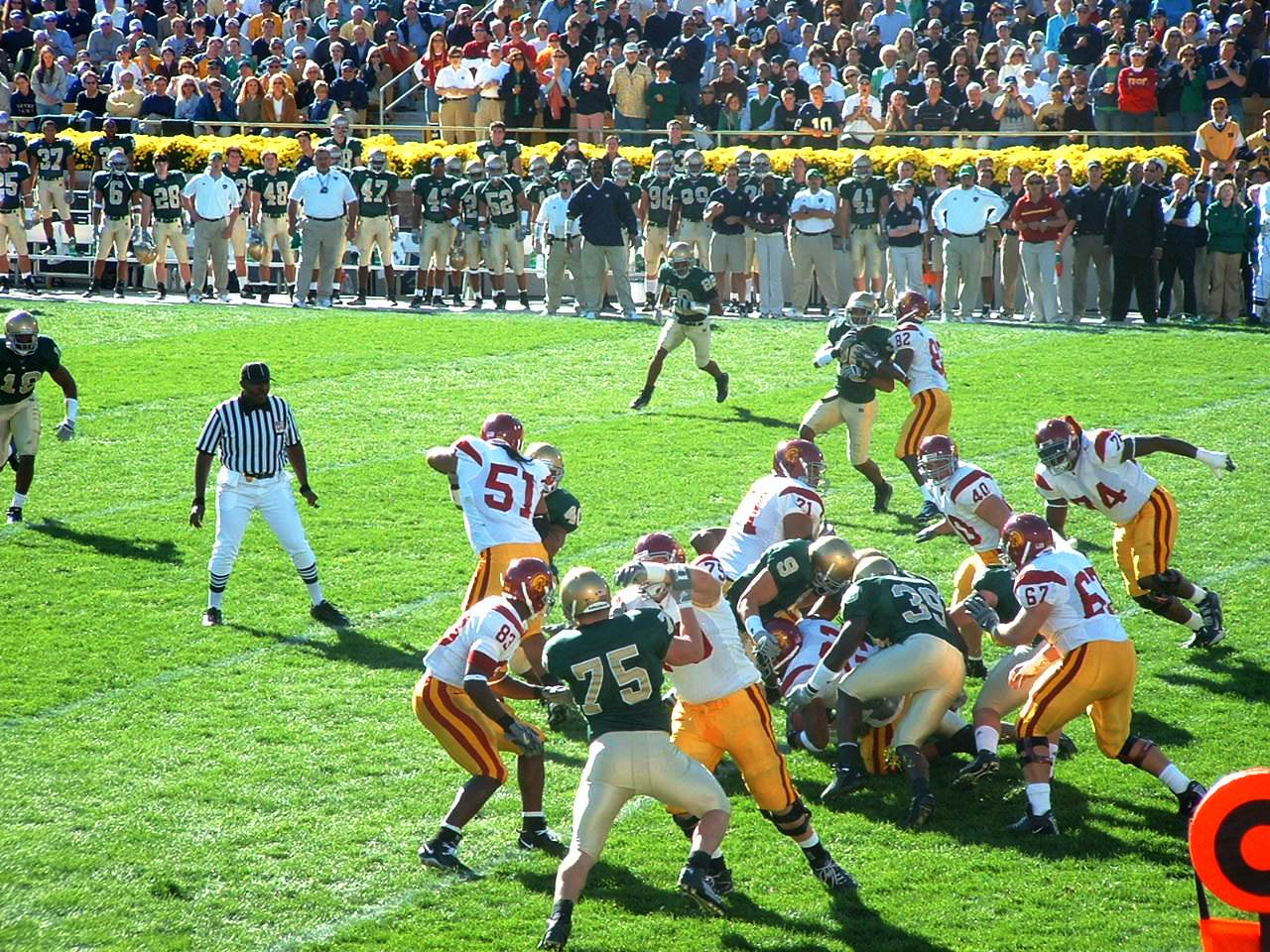
USC vs Notre Dame at Notre Dame Stadium

In a game that looked to be overshadowed by pre-game hype and assertions of being the newest "Game of the Century", the meeting between perennial rivals, Notre Dame and USC, called by some the second greatest rivalry in college football, would be the 77th meeting between the schools, who play for the Jeweled Shillelagh. The Irish, led by first–year coach Charlie Weis and junior quarterback Brady Quinn, were ranked ninth in the country. The Trojans had won three straight meetings with the Irish, each by 31 points. Expectations, however, were high that this game would be closer.

In a surprise move, after Weis insisted it would not happen, the Irish wore their alternate green jerseys for the game. The score was back and forth for much of the game, with the Irish leading 21–14 at half-time after a pair of touchdowns by running backs Reggie Bush and LenDale White for the Trojans, and a rushing touchdown by Travis Thomas, a passing touchdown by Quinn, and a punt return for a touchdown by Tom Zbikowski for the Irish. The Trojans took a 28–24 lead with five minutes left in the game when Reggie Bush ran for his third touchdown of the game, however, Quinn answered with four complete passes and his own 5 yard touchdown run to give the Irish a 31–28 lead with less than two minutes remaining. On the Trojans last series, however, Leinart, after being sacked and facing fourth down with nine yards to go on the Irish 26 yard line, completed a 61-yard fade to Dwayne Jarrett to give the Trojans a last chance near the Irish goal line. After a series of plays including Leinart fumbling the ball out of bounds, the stadium clock incorrectly running out of time, and part of the Notre Dame student section rushing onto the field, the Trojans had the ball on the Irish 1 yard line with seven seconds remaining. Instead of opting for the field goal and going to overtime, Leinart tried to sneak into the end zone. When he was stopped, in a play that would come to be called the "Bush Push", Bush pushed him over the goal line for the winning score of 34–31. In the aftermath of the game, the Irish dropped to a 4–2 record for the season and dropped three places in the national rankings to 12th. The Trojans moved to 6–0 on the season, escaped with a 28-game winning streak, and remained first in the rankings.

==== Washington ====
	1	2	3	4	Total
#1 Trojans	14	23	7	7	51
Huskies	10	7	0	7	24

The Trojans next visited the Washington Huskies, led by first–year head coach Tyrone Willingham and quarterback Isaiah Stanback. The Huskies took an early lead on a field goal, but the Trojans answered with a Leinart touchdown pass to Steve Smith. Stanback threw his only touchdown of the game late in the quarter to give the Huskies a 10–7 lead, but the Trojans took the lead for good less than a minute later with Leinart's second touchdown pass of the day. A minute into the second quarter Reggie Bush ran for a touchdown, and, after a failed extra point attempt and the Huskies offense unable to move the ball, two minutes later returned a punt 84 yards for a touchdown. After another failed drive for the Huskies and another two minutes, Leinart threw his third touchdown of the game to give the Trojans a 34–10 lead. Stanback rushed for a touchdown with two minutes remaining before half-time to cut their deficit in half, but Mario Danelo kicked a field goal as time expired to give the Trojans a 37–17 lead at half-time. In the third quarter, Leinart threw his fourth touchdown of the game before he was replaced by backup Booty. A Booty interception, that was returned 76 yards by Dashon Goldson, gave the Huskies their last score of the game, and Booty's touchdown pass to Patrick Turner proved to be the final score in the game, giving the Trojans a 51–24 win. With the win the Trojans extended their winning streak to 29 games.

==== Washington State ====
	1	2	3	4	Total
Cougars	6	0	0	7	13
#2 Trojans	28	10	3	14	55

The Trojans next faced the Washington State Cougars, led by third–year head coach Bill Doba and quarterback Alex Brink. The Trojans took an early lead on a Leinart touchdown pass to Dwayne Jarrett, but the Cougars answered two minutes later on a Jerome Harrison rush for a touchdown. After the Cougars missed the extra point, the Trojans scored three more touchdowns in the first quarter, with a fumble recovery in the end zone and two more Leinart touchdown passes, to take a 28–6 lead. Late in the second quarter the Trojans scored again on a LenDale White touchdown rush, and a Mario Danelo field goal as time was expiring gave them a 38–6 half-time lead. The Trojans would get another Danelo field goal and a second White touchdown rush before the Cougars would rush for their second touchdown. With a final rushing touchdown after the starters had been taken out of the game, the Trojans won 55–13 and increased their winning streak to 30 games.

==== Stanford ====
	1	2	3	4	Total
Cardinal	0	7	7	7	21
#1 Trojans	24	20	0	7	51

The Trojans next faced the Stanford Cardinal. Though the Cardinal were the last team to beat the Trojans at home back in 2001, they were slightly struggling under first–year head coach Walt Harris and quarterback Trent Edwards with a 4–3 record. The Trojans jumped to an early lead with a LenDale White rushing touchdown, a Reggie Bush rushing touchdown, a Leinart touchdown pass to White, and a Mario Danelo field goal. With a 24-point lead, Leinart threw two more touchdown passes before Edwards passed for the first Cardinal touchdown of the game. Leinart's fourth touchdown pass came with three minutes left in the half to give the Trojans a 44–7 half-time lead. The Cardinal scored on a rush in the third quarter, and with many starters out the Trojans answered in the fourth quarter with their own rushing touchdown. The Cardinal ended the scoring with 23 seconds remaining with their second rushing touchdown of the game to bring the score to 51–21. With the win, the Trojans extended their winning streak to 31 games.

==== California ====
	1	2	3	4	Total
#1 Trojans	7	14	7	7	35
Golden Bears	3	0	0	7	10

The Trojans next traveled to face rivals, the California Golden Bears, led by fourth–year head coach Jeff Tedford and quarterback Joe Ayoob. Although the Bears handed the Trojans their last loss in 2003, they were struggling in the season, having lost three out of the last four games and dropping out of the rankings for the first time since 2003. The Trojans scored first after Ayoob's first of four interceptions in the game, on a LenDale White rush. Ayoob recovered after the interception, and led the Bears to a field goal to cut their deficit to four at the end of the first quarter. In the second quarter, Leinart rushed for a pair of touchdowns to give the Trojans a 21–3 lead at half-time. After a pair of White rushing touchdowns, the Bears scored again on a Chris Manerino rush that ended scoring in the game, with the Trojans winning 35–10. With the win, the Trojans clinched at least a share of the Pac-10 title and increased their winning streak to 32 games, tied for the sixth longest in history.

==== Fresno State ====
	1	2	3	4	Total
#16 Bulldogs	7	14	7	14	42
#1 Trojans	7	6	28	9	50

The Trojans next faced the sixteenth–ranked Fresno State Bulldogs, led by ninth–year head coach Pat Hill and quarterback Paul Pinegar. The Bulldogs took an early lead on a Pinegar touchdown pass that was answered by LenDale White's rushing touchdown for the Trojans to leave the game tied at the end of the first quarter. After a rushing touchdown for the Bulldogs, the Trojans could only answer with a Mario Danelo field goal. A second passing touchdown by Pinegar and another Danelo field goal closed out the half with the Bulldogs leading 21–13. The Trojans seemed to take control of the game in the third quarter with a Leinart touchdown run, a Reggie Bush touchdown run, and a Leinart touchdown pass that gave the Trojans a 13-point lead. Pinegar answered for the Bulldogs with his third touchdown pass of the game, but a 50-yard touchdown rush by Bush allowed the Trojans to keep the same lead, Two touchdowns in the fourth quarter, Pinegar's fourth touchdown pass and a second rushing touchdown for the Bulldogs, gave them a 1-point lead with nine minutes left in the game. After a 65-yard run by Bush, White scored for the Trojans, who missed on a two–point conversion attempt. A Danelo field goal gave the Trojans a 50–42 lead, and the Trojans won after intercepting Pinegar with a minute left in the game. Bush set a Pac-10 record with 513 total yards in the game, including almost 300 yards rushing, and the Trojans increased their winning streak to 33 games.

==== UCLA ====
#11 UCLA Bruins (9–1) at #1 USC Trojans (11–0)

Quarter	1	2	3	4	Total
UCLA	0	6	0	13	19
USC	10	21	21	14	66

at Los Angeles Memorial Coliseum • Los Angeles, California

- Date: December 3
- Game time: 1:40 p.m. PDT
- Game weather: Fair • 67 °F (19 °C) • Wind N/NW 11 miles per hour (18 km/h; 9.6 kn)
- Game attendance: 92,000
- Box Score

Game information

UCLA

- Drew Olson
  14/32, 146 Yds, TD
- Maurice Drew
  14 Rush, 84 Yds, TD
- Marcedes Lewis
  3 Rec, 30 Yds

USC

- Matt Leinart
  21/40, 233 Yds, 3 TD
- Reggie Bush
  24 Rush, 260 Yds, 2 TD
- Dwayne Jarrett
  6 Rec, 83 Yds, TD

For their final regular season game the Trojans faced their cross-town rivals, the eleventh–ranked UCLA Bruins, led by fourth–year head coach Karl Dorrell and quarterback Drew Olson. The Trojans got an early lead with a Mario Danelo field goal and did not slow down, scoring on a Leinart touchdown pass and a pair of rushing touchdowns by LenDale White and Reggie Bush. The Bruins were finally able to score midway through the second quarter with a field goal, and then four minutes later with another, but Bush ran for his second touchdown late in the quarter to give the Trojans a 31–6 lead at half-time. In the third quarter, Leinart threw his second touchdown of the game, and then 13 seconds later, a fumble by the Bruins was returned by Justin Wyatt for another Trojan touchdown. Leinart threw his third touchdown of the game to White and White rushed for his second rushing touchdown before the Bruins would score on a Maurice Drew rush. With backups in the game, the Trojans scored on another rush, before Olson threw his only touchdown pass of the game with 11 seconds left. With the missed extra point, the Trojans won 66–19, increasing their winning streak to 34 games, which tied them for the fourth longest winning streak of all time. With the win, they clinched the Pac-10 title, first place in the BCS rankings, and an invitation to the Rose Bowl, which served as the national championship game.

Scoring summary

Quarter	Time	Drive			Team	Scoring information	Score	
Quarter	Time	Plays	Yards	TOP	Team	Scoring information	UCLA	USC
1	9:12	16	70	5:48	USC	35-yard field goal by Mario Danelo	0	3
1	3:03	8	80	3:03	USC	Dwayne Jarrett 8-yard touchdown reception from Matt Leinart, Mario Danelo kick good	0	10
2	13:02	8	97	2:09	USC	LenDale White 19-yard touchdown run, Mario Danelo kick good	0	17
2	10:57	7	36	2:05	USC	Reggie Bush 13-yard touchdown run, Mario Danelo kick good	0	24
2	8:09	6	28	2:43	UCLA	43-yard field goal by Justin Medlock	3	24
2	4:00	5	18	1:42	UCLA	43-yard field goal by Justin Medlock	6	24
2	1:33	6	78	2:27	USC	Reggie Bush 10-yard touchdown run, Mario Danelo kick good	6	31
3	6:31	10	74	3:27	USC	Fred Davis 15-yard touchdown reception from Matt Leinart, Mario Danelo kick good	6	38
3	6:18				USC	Fumble recovery returned 38 yards for touchdown by Justin Wyatt, Mario Danelo kick good	6	45
3	0:55	10	81	3:42	USC	LenDale White 24-yard touchdown reception from Matt Leinart, Mario Danelo kick good	6	52
4	11:28	10	84	3:46	USC	LenDale White 8-yard touchdown run, Mario Danelo kick good	6	59
4	3:33	8	53	3:11	UCLA	Maurice Drew 15-yard touchdown run, Justin Medlock kick good	13	59
4	3:23	1	2	0:10	USC	David Kirtman 2-yard touchdown run, Mario Danelo kick good	13	66
4	0:11	7	67	3:12	UCLA	Matt Willis 13-yard touchdown reception from Drew Olson, Justin Medlock kick no good	19	66
"TOP" = time of possession. For other American football terms, see Glossary of American football.							19	66

==== Rose Bowl ====
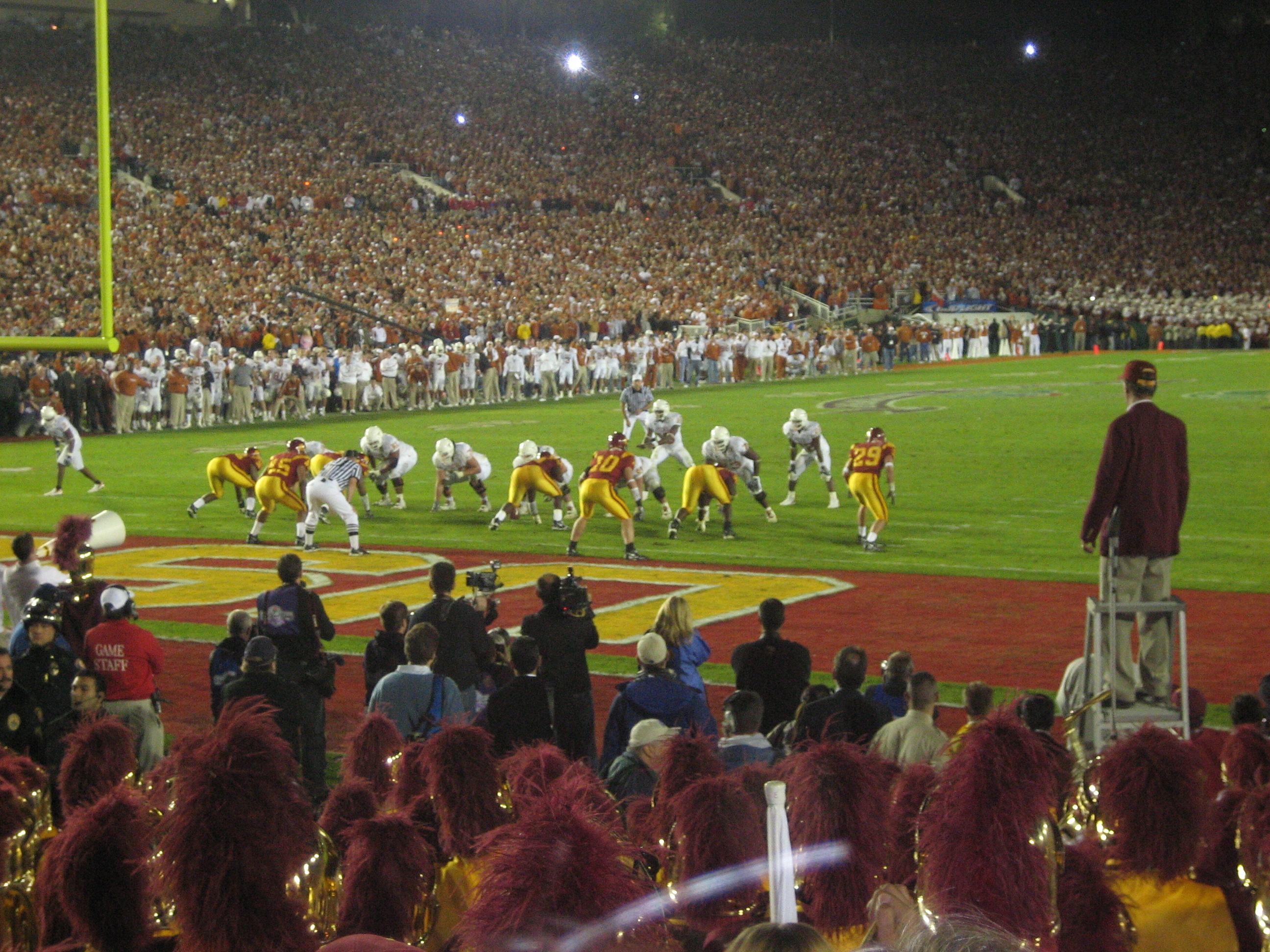
Vince Young about to score the go-ahead touchdown.

	1	2	3	4	Total
#2 Longhorns	0	16	7	18	41
#1 Trojans	7	3	14	14	38

The Rose Bowl Game served as the BCS National Championship Game, and as a result of the Bowl Championship Series agreement, the Trojans, ranked first in the BCS and the Texas Longhorns, ranked second, would meet in the game. In the weeks leading up to the game, it had been referred to by numerous publications as one of the most-anticipated match-ups in college football history and even "the greatest college football game" of all time.

Less than three weeks before the game, USC's Reggie Bush won the Heisman Trophy ahead of second place finisher, and Texas quarterback, Vince Young. Bush had the second highest number of first place votes in Heisman history (O. J. Simpson) and the highest percentage of first place votes, while Young had a record number of second place votes. Bush's 933 point margin of victory was the 17th highest in the history of the Heisman voting. The third finalist was Matt Leinart, winner of the Heisman Trophy in 2004. This meant that the Rose Bowl would mark the first time two Heisman Trophy winners had played in the same backfield.

In the game, coach Mack Brown and his Texas Longhorns beat USC by the score of 41–38 and ended USC's 34 game win streak. The game's outcome was still in doubt late in the fourth quarter, when the Trojans tried to convert a fourth down play that would win the game for them. After they were stopped Young led the Longhorns on a touchdown drive that was capped by his fourth down rush for the twelve yard touchdown.

Since the game, the media, coaches, and other commentators have praised the game as one of the greatest ever.

=== Roster ===
Wide receiver

- 1 Mike Williams – senior
- 1 Patrick Turner – freshman
- 2 Steve Smith – junior
- 4 Whitney Lewis – (redshirt) sophomore
- 8 Dwayne Jarrett – sophomore
- 11 Christian Allen* – (redshirt) sophomore
- 19 Grieg Carlson – (redshirt) senior
- 26 Wil Smith – (redshirt) senior
- 31 William Buchanon – (redshirt) senior
- 48 Brad Walker – sophomore
- 80 John Zilka – (redshirt) junior
- 82 Chris McFoy – (redshirt) junior

Center

- 61 Ross Burruel – (redshirt) senior
- 67 Ryan Kalil – junior
- 69 Matt Spanos – (redshirt) sophomore

Offensive guard

- 51 Fred Matua – (redshirt) junior
- 53 Jeff Byers – sophomore
- 60 Drew Radovich – (redshirt) sophomore
- 66 Chilo Rachal – (redshirt) freshman
- 70 Alatini Malu – (redshirt) sophomore
- 71 Taitusi Lutui – senior
- 72 John Lanza – (redshirt) junior

Offensive tackle

- 62 Dominique Wise – (redshirt) sophomore
- 73 Jonathan Richert – (redshirt) junior
- 74 Winston Justice – (redshirt) junior
- 76 Nick Howell – freshman
- 78 Kyle Williams – (redshirt) junior
- 79 Sam Baker – (redshirt) sophomore

Tight end

- 83 Fred Davis – sophomore
- 85 Charles Brown – freshman
- 86 Dominique Byrd – senior
- 87 Nick Vanderboom – (redshirt) junior
- 88 Jimmy Miller – (redshirt) freshman
- 89 Dale Thompson – sophomore

Quarterback

- 6 Mark Sanchez – freshman
- 9 John David Booty – (redshirt) sophomore
- 11 Matt Leinart – (redshirt) senior
- 13 Tom Harwood – (redshirt) sophomore
- 16 Mike McDonald – (redshirt) sophomore

Halfback

- 5 Reggie Bush – junior
- 21 LenDale White – junior
- 22 Desmond Reed – (redshirt) sophomore
- 23 Chauncey Washington – (redshirt) sophomore
- 27 Michael Coleman – freshman
- 28 Andre Woodert – (redshirt) sophomore
- 29 John Griffin – (redshirt) sophomore
- 34 Hershel Dennis – senior

Fullback

- 30 Mike Brittingham – (redshirt) junior
- 37 David Kirtman – (redshirt) senior
- 40 Brandon Hancock – (redshirt) junior
- 41 Jody Adewale – (redshirt) sophomore
- 47 Sean Kelly – (redshirt) sophomore

Defensive end

- 49 Rashaad Goodrum – (redshirt) junior
- 54 Jeff Schweiger – sophomore
- 65 Jeff Tola – sophomore
- 84 Kyle Moore – freshman
- 90 Frostee Rucker – (redshirt) senior
- 91 Chris Barrett – (redshirt) sophomore
- 95 Travis Tofi – (redshirt) junior
- 96 Lawrence Jackson – (redshirt) sophomore
- 97 Alex Morrow – (redshirt) sophomore

Defensive tackle

- 49 Sedrick Ellis – (redshirt) sophomore
- 63 Travis Draper – (redshirt) freshman
- 64 Mike Davis – (redshirt) sophomore
- 75 Fili Moala – (redshirt) freshman
- 93 Lawrence Miles – (redshirt) freshman
- ~~94 Lawrence Miles – senior~~
- 98 LaJuan Ramsey – senior
- 99 Averell Spicer – freshman

Cornerback

- 7 Cary Harris – freshman
- 9 Mozique McCurtis – sophomore
- 15 Kevin Thomas – freshman
- 18 John Walker – (redshirt) senior
- 22 Jim Abbot – (redshirt) freshman
- 24 Justin Wyatt – senior
- 28 Terrell Thomas – (redshirt) sophomore
- 30 Jerry Williams – junior
- 31 Jamel Williams – junior
- 46 Alex Gomez – (redshirt) senior
- 48 Matthew Jordan – freshman

Linebacker

- 10 Brian Cushing – freshman
- 23 Nick Garratt – freshman
- 41 Thomas Williams – (redshirt) sophomore
- 42 Dallas Sartz – senior
- 43 Kaluka Maiava – freshman
- 45 Oscar Lua – (redshirt) junior
- 47 Clay Matthews – (redshirt) freshman
- 52 Luthur Brown – freshman
- 55 Keith Rivers – (redshirt) sophomore
- 56 Ryan Powdrell – (redshirt) senior
- 58 Rey Maualuga – freshman
- 59 Colin Ashton – (redshirt) senior

Safety

- 4 Kevin Ellison – freshman
- 16 Chase McWhorter – (redshirt) sophomore
- 20 Darnell Bing – junior
- 26 Will Harris – freshman
- 29 Scott Ware – senior
- 35 Justin Hart – freshman
- 36 Josh Pinkard – sophomore
- 38 Brandon Ting – junior
- 39 Ryan Ting – junior

Long snapper

- 50 Will Colins – (redshirt) sophomore

Punter

- 14 Tom Malone – senior
- 18 Taylor Odegard – (redshirt) freshman
- 46 Sean Limahelu – (redshirt) freshman

Place kicker

- 9 Phil Mellinger – (redshirt) freshman
- 17 Troy Van Blarcom – freshman
- 19 Mario Danelo – (redshirt) sophomore

Sources: Scout.com 2005 USC Roster

=== Coaching staff ===
The Trojan team was coached by Pete Carroll and his staff. Much of the staff from 2004 remained, however, Carroll had to replace three offensive assistants and one defensive assistant.

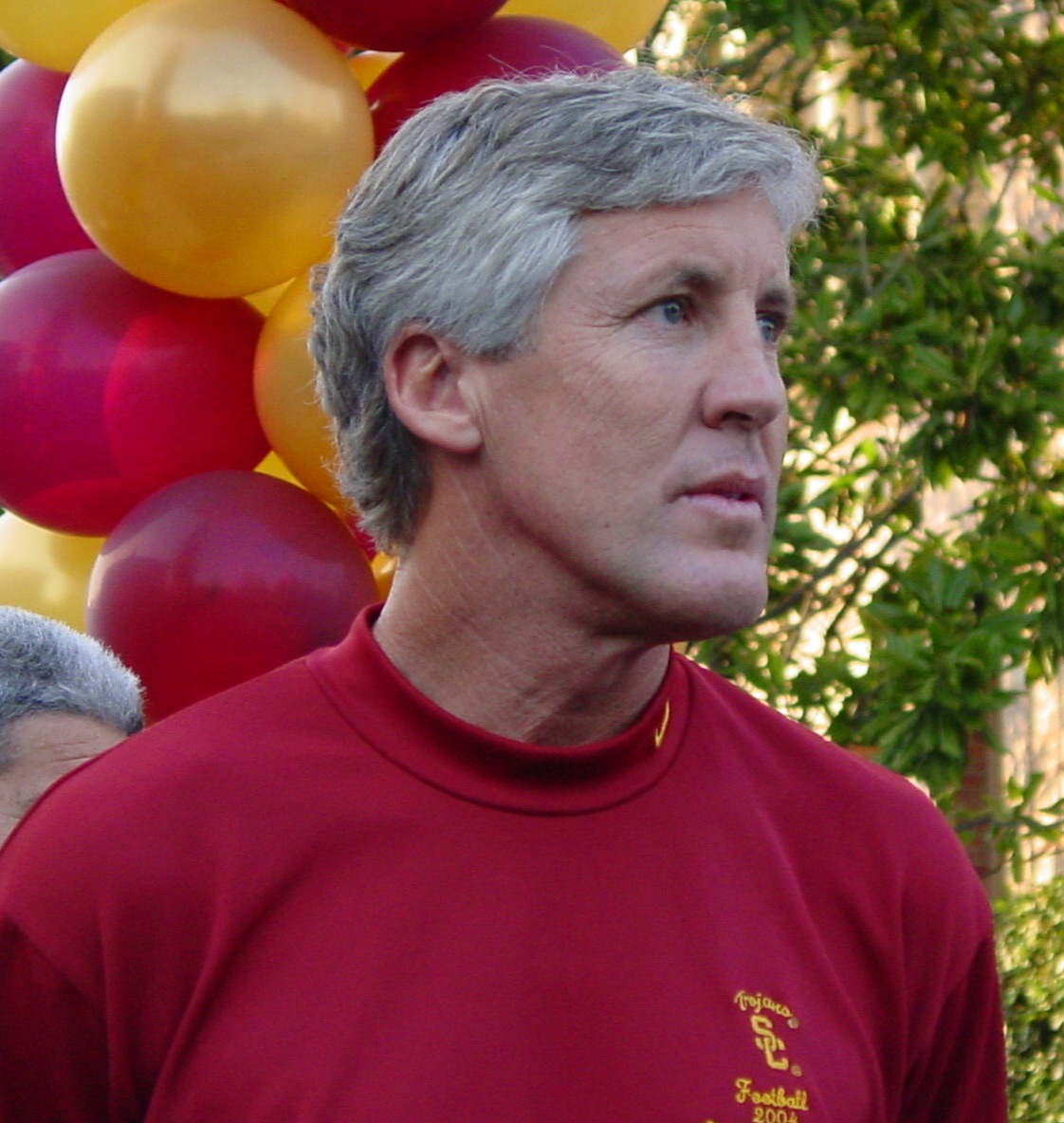
Head coach Pete Carroll

Name	Position	Year at USC	Alma mater (year)
Pete Carroll	Head coach Defensive coordinator	5th	Pacific (1973)
Steve Sarkisian	Quarterbacks; Assistant head coach	4th	Brigham Young (1996)
Ken Norton Jr.	Linebackers	2nd	UCLA (1988)
Jethro Franklin	Defensive line	1st	Fresno State (1988)
Brennan Carroll	Tight ends	4th	Pittsburgh (2001)
Lane Kiffin	Offensive coordinator Wide receivers Recruiting coordinator	5th	Fresno State (1998)
Pat Ruel	Offensive line	1st	Miami (1972)
Todd McNair	Running backs	2nd	Temple (1988)
Greg Burns	Secondary	4th	Washington State (1995)

== After the season ==
=== Legacy ===
Throughout the season and especially after the win over UCLA, commentators had postulated that the Trojans were one of the "greatest teams of all-time". ESPN analysts were virtually unanimous in their declaration of the 2005 USC Trojans as the best offense in the history of college football. ESPN analysts Mark May and Kirk Herbstreit declared, before the 2005 Rose Bowl had even been played, that the 2005 USC Trojans were the 2nd best college football team of the past 50 years (May placed them behind only the 1995 Nebraska Cornhuskers; Herbstreit behind only the 2001 Miami Hurricanes). Stewart Mandel of Sports Illustrated later observed that, although the team "may have had the greatest set of skill players in history," "ESPN spent the better part of Christmas season comparing that Trojans squad to some of the most acclaimed teams of all time only to find out that they weren’t even the best team that season."

==== NCAA investigation and sanctions ====
In June 2010, the NCAA imposed sanctions on USC as a result of an investigation into the football program. One of the major focuses was improper gifts given to Reggie Bush.

The NCAA found that Bush had received gifts from two sports agents from at least December 2004, including a limousine ride to the 2005 Heisman Trophy presentation and a rent-free home. As a result, USC was placed on four years' probation and forced to vacate its last two wins of the 2004 season (including the 2005 Orange Bowl) as well as all of its wins in the 2005 season. It was also banned from bowl games in 2010 and 2011 and lost 30 scholarships over three years. Running backs coach Todd McNair was banned from off-campus recruiting for one year after the NCAA determined he'd known about Bush's dealings with the agents. The NCAA also forced USC to permanently disassociate itself from Bush. These sanctions have been criticized by some NCAA football writers, including ESPN’s Ted Miller, who wrote, “It's become an accepted fact among informed college football observers that the NCAA sanctions against USC were a travesty of justice, and the NCAA’s refusal to revisit that travesty are a massive act of cowardice on the part of the organization. That's the take of all clear-thinking people.”

Bush would eventually manage to get his USC career statistics reinstated. On April 24, 2024, it was announced that Bush would have his Heisman Trophy reinstated because of what the Heisman Trust calls "enormous changes in the college football landscape." However, this did not change what the NCAA imposed against USC.

=== Awards ===
==== Conference ====
Near the end of the season, the Pac-10 Conference named its award winners. Reggie Bush was named as the conference player of the year and Pete Carroll was named as the conference coach of the year. In addition, twelve players were named to the All-Conference team. Bush, Matt Leinart, Dwayne Jarrett, Taitusi Latui, Sam Baker, Ryan Kalil, Darnell Bing, Lawrence Jackson, and Frostee Rucker were named to the first team while LenDale White, Fred Matua, and Scott Ware were named to the second team. Nine others were also named as honorable mentions.

==== National ====
After the season, a number of Trojans were named as national award winners and finalists. Reggie Bush became USC's seventh Heisman Trophy winner with the second largest margin of victory ever. However, after the aforementioned NCAA investigation, USC would return its copy of Bush's Heisman Trophy, considering that Bush was determined to be ineligible to play by the NCAA. On September 14, 2010, Bush announced that he would forfeit the Heisman and return his copy of the trophy. Bush also won the Doak Walker Award. Despite not winning the Maxwell Award, he won two other Player of the Year awards. Leinart, who was voted third in the Heisman Trophy ballot, was named as a finalist for the Davey O'Brien Award and the Maxwell Award, won the Johnny Unitas Golden Arm Award, and was named by The Sporting News as their Sportsman of the Year. In addition, Pete Carroll was named a finalist for the Eddie Robinson Coach of the Year award, and Jarrett was named a finalist for the Biletnikoff Award, though neither won.

In addition to the individual awards, ten players were named to All-America teams. On first teams, Bush was named by nine different publications, Leinart was named by two, Jarrett was named by seven, Lutui was named by six, Bing was named by two, and Blake was named by one publication. Besides the first teams, Kalil was named to a second team along with White and Matua, while Lawrence Jackson was named to a third team.

=== Roster changes ===
A week after the loss in the Rose Bowl, Reggie Bush announced his plans to skip his senior season and declare for the 2006 NFL draft. Along with Bush, ten other Trojans were drafted. Bush was the first Trojan selected and the second overall pick by New Orleans, while 2004 Heisman-winner, Matt Leinart, was taken tenth overall by Arizona. Three players were taken in the second round, Winston Justice by Philadelphia, Taitusi Lutui by Arizona, and LenDale White by Tennessee, and two more were taken in the third round, Frostee Rucker to Cincinnati and Dominique Byrd by St. Louis to end the first day of the draft. On the second day, Darnell Bing was taken in the fourth round by Oakland, David Kirtman taken in the fifth round by Seattle, LaJuan Ramsey taken in the sixth by Philadelphia, and, finally, Fred Matua was taken in the seventh by Detroit to end the Trojans' draft day.

== Staff ==
Name	Position
Pete Carroll	Head coach/defensive coordinator
Lane Kiffin	Offensive coordinator / recruiting coordinator/wide receivers coach
Brennan Carroll	Tight ends coach
Rocky Seto	Linebackers coach
Ken Norton Jr.	Linebackers coach
Todd McNair	Running backs coach
Steve Sarkisian	Quarterbacks coach/assistant head coach
Jethro Franklin	Defensive line coach
Pat Ruel	Offensive line coach
Greg Burns	Secondary coach
Dennis Slutak	Special teams coordinator
Sam Anno	Graduate assistant
