= 2005 Fresno State Bulldogs football team =

American college football season

2005 Fresno State Bulldogs football
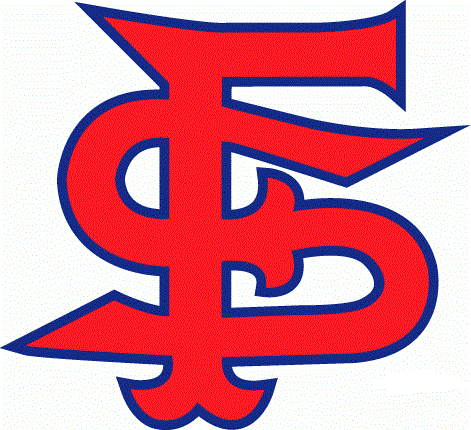

Liberty Bowl, L 24–31 vs. Tulsa
- Conference: Western Athletic Conference
- Record: 8–5 (6–2 WAC)
- Head coach: Pat Hill (9th season)
- Offensive coordinator: Frank Cignetti Jr. (4th season)
- Offensive scheme: Pro-style
- Defensive coordinator: Dan Brown (5th season)
- Base defense: 4–3
- Home stadium: Bulldog Stadium

2005 Western Athletic Conference football standings
	Conf.			Overall
Team	W		L	W		L
Boise State +	7	–	1	9	–	4
Nevada +	7	–	1	9	–	3
Louisiana Tech	6	–	2	7	–	4
Fresno State	6	–	2	8	–	5
Hawaii	4	–	4	5	–	7
San Jose State	2	–	6	3	–	8
Utah State	2	–	6	3	–	8
Idaho	2	–	6	2	–	9
New Mexico State	0	–	8	0	–	12
+ – Conference co-champions

The 2005 Fresno State football team represented California State University, Fresno in the 2005 NCAA Division I-A football season, and competed as a member of the Western Athletic Conference. Led by head coach Pat Hill, the Bulldogs played their home games at Bulldog Stadium in Fresno, California.

== Schedule ==
Date	Time	Opponent	Rank	Site	TV	Result	Attendance	Source
September 10	7:00 pm	Weber State*	No. 24	Bulldog Stadium; Fresno, CA	ESPNU	W 55–17	38,156	
September 17	4:00 pm	at Oregon*	No. 23	Autzen Stadium; Eugene, OR	TBS	L 34–37	58,201	
September 27	6:00 pm	Toledo*		Bulldog Stadium; Fresno, CA	ESPN2	W 44–14	34,637	
October 8	7:00 pm	at New Mexico State		Aggie Memorial Stadium; Las Cruces, NM	BSN/ESPNU	W 37–7	8,312	
October 15	7:00 pm	Utah State^{†}		Bulldog Stadium; Fresno, CA		W 53–21	42,701	
October 22	2:00 pm	at Idaho	No. 24	Kibbie Dome; Moscow, ID	BSN	W 40–10	15,047	
October 29	4:00 pm	at Hawaii	No. 22	Aloha Stadium; Halawa, HI (rivalry)	ABC	W 27–13	28,196	
November 5	6:00 pm	San Jose State	No. 21	Bulldog Stadium; Fresno, CA (rivalry)	BSN	W 45–7	41,039	
November 10	5:00 pm	Boise State	No. 20	Bulldog Stadium; Fresno, CA (rivalry)	ESPN	W 27–7	42,781	
November 19	7:15 pm	at No. 1 USC*	No. 16	Los Angeles Memorial Coliseum; Los Angeles, CA	FSN	L 42–50	90,007	
November 26	4:00 pm	at Nevada	No. 16	Mackay Stadium; Reno, NV	ESPN2	L 35–38	17,765	
December 2	6:00 pm	Louisiana Tech	No. 23	Bulldog Stadium; Fresno, CA	ESPN2	L 28–40	36,525	
December 31	10:00 am	vs. Tulsa*		Liberty Bowl Memorial Stadium; Memphis, TN (Liberty Bowl)	ESPN	L 21–34	54,894	
*Non-conference game; ^{†}Homecoming; Rankings from AP Poll released prior to the game; All times are in Pacific time

== Game summaries ==
=== Weber State ===
	1	2	3	4	Total
Wildcats	0	10	0	7	17
Bulldogs	21	21	7	6	55

=== At Oregon ===
	1	2	3	4	Total
Bulldogs	10	7	10	7	34
Ducks	0	20	10	7	37

=== Toledo ===
	1	2	3	4	Total
Rockets	7	0	0	7	14
Bulldogs	0	27	17	0	44

=== At New Mexico State ===
	1	2	3	4	Total
Bulldogs	17	3	3	14	37
Aggies	0	7	0	0	7

=== Utah State ===
	1	2	3	4	Total
Aggies	7	0	0	14	21
Bulldogs	17	6	23	7	53

=== At Idaho ===
	1	2	3	4	Total
Bulldogs	14	2	10	14	40
Vandals	7	3	0	0	10

=== At Hawaii ===
	1	2	3	4	Total
Bulldogs	0	14	6	7	27
Warriors	0	10	3	0	13

=== San Jose State ===
	1	2	3	4	Total
Spartans	0	0	7	0	7
Bulldogs	14	10	14	7	45

=== Boise State ===
	1	2	3	4	Total
Broncos	7	0	0	0	7
Bulldogs	7	20	0	0	27

=== At Southern California ===
	1	2	3	4	Total
Bulldogs	7	14	7	14	42
Trojans	7	6	28	9	50

=== At Nevada ===
	1	2	3	4	Total
Bulldogs	3	13	3	16	35
Wolf Pack	10	14	0	14	38

=== Louisiana Tech ===
	1	2	3	4	Total
Louisiana Tech Bulldogs	3	23	7	7	40
Fresno State Bulldogs	3	0	7	18	28

=== Vs. Tulsa (Liberty Bowl) ===
	1	2	3	4	Total
Bulldogs	7	7	3	7	24
Golden Hurricane	0	17	0	14	31

== Coaching staff ==
Name	Position	Seasons at Fresno State	Alma mater
Pat Hill	Head coach	9th as HC; 15th overall	UC Riverside (1973)
Frank Cignetti Jr.	Offensive coordinator	4th	Indiana (PA) (1988)
Dan Brown	Defensive coordinator	9th	Boise State (1982)
John Baxter	Special Teams/Wide Receivers	9th	Loras College
Tom Mason	Assistant Head Coach/Linebackers	5th	Eastern Washington (1982)
Kerry Locklin	Defensive Line	6th	New Mexico State (1982)
John Settle	Running Backs	8th	Appalachian State (1989)
Randy Stewart	Defensive Backs		
Tim Simons	Tight Ends		
Mark Weber	Offensive Line		
