= 2005 San Jose State Spartans football team =

American college football season

2005 San Jose State Spartans football
- Conference: Western Athletic Conference
- Record: 3–8 (2–6 WAC)
- Head coach: Dick Tomey (1st season)
- Offensive coordinator: Ken Margerum (1st season)
- Defensive coordinator: Dave Fipp (1st season)
- Home stadium: Spartan Stadium

2005 Western Athletic Conference football standings
	Conf.			Overall
Team	W		L	W		L
Boise State +	7	–	1	9	–	4
Nevada +	7	–	1	9	–	3
Louisiana Tech	6	–	2	7	–	4
Fresno State	6	–	2	8	–	5
Hawaii	4	–	4	5	–	7
San Jose State	2	–	6	3	–	8
Utah State	2	–	6	3	–	8
Idaho	2	–	6	2	–	9
New Mexico State	0	–	8	0	–	12
+ – Conference co-champions

The 2005 San Jose State Spartans football team represented San Jose State University in the 2005 NCAA Division I-A football season. The team played their home games at Spartan Stadium in San Jose, California. They participated as members of the Western Athletic Conference. They were coached by head coach Dick Tomey.

== Schedule ==
Date	Time	Opponent	Site	TV	Result	Attendance	Source
September 3	3:00 pm	No. 4 (I-AA) Eastern Washington*	Spartan Stadium; San Jose, CA		W 35–24	11,878	
September 10	11:00 am	at Illinois*	Memorial Stadium; Champaign, IL		L 19–40	49,276	
September 24	5:00 pm	at San Diego State*	Qualcomm Stadium; San Diego, CA	SPW	L 21–52	55,868	
October 1	4:00 pm	Nevada	Spartan Stadium; San Jose, CA	ABC	L 23–30	17,492	
October 8	12:00 pm	at Utah State	Romney Stadium; Logan, UT		L 17–24	12,542	
October 15	5:05 pm	at Boise State	Bronco Stadium; Boise, ID		L 21–38	30,342	
October 22	3:00 pm	Hawaii^{†}	Spartan Stadium; San Jose, CA (rivalry)	FSNBA	L 38–45	18,129	
October 29	4:00 pm	at Louisiana Tech	Joe Aillet Stadium; Ruston, LA		L 14–31	12,758	
November 5	6:00 pm	at No. 21 Fresno State	Bulldog Stadium; Fresno, CA (rivalry)	SPW	L 7–45	41,039	
November 19	3:00 pm	New Mexico State	Spartan Stadium; San Jose, CA	SPW	W 27–10	6,985	
November 26	3:00 pm	Idaho	Spartan Stadium; San Jose, CA	FSNBA	W 26–18	8,045	
*Non-conference game; ^{†}Homecoming; Rankings from AP Poll released prior to the game; All times are in Pacific time

== Game summaries ==
=== Eastern Washington ===
	1	2	3	4	Total
Eagles	14	3	7	0	24
Spartans	7	7	21	0	35

=== At Illinois ===
	1	2	3	4	Total
Spartans	7	0	0	12	19
Fighting Illini	21	6	10	3	40

=== At San Diego State ===
	1	2	3	4	Total
Spartans	14	0	0	7	21
Aztecs	14	14	7	17	52

=== Nevada ===
	1	2	3	4	Total
Wolf Pack	13	7	0	10	30
Spartans	0	17	3	3	23

=== At Utah State ===
	1	2	3	4	Total
Spartans	0	7	7	3	17
Aggies	7	14	3	0	24

=== At Boise State ===
	1	2	3	4	Total
Spartans	7	0	0	14	21
Broncos	7	24	0	7	38

=== Hawai'i ===
	1	2	3	4	Total
Rainbow Warriors	10	21	7	7	45
Spartans	7	14	7	10	38

=== At Louisiana Tech ===
	1	2	3	4	Total
Spartans	14	0	0	0	14
Bulldogs	14	0	14	3	31

=== At No. 21 Fresno State ===
	1	2	3	4	Total
Spartans	0	0	7	0	7
No. 21 Bulldogs	14	10	14	7	45

=== New Mexico State ===
	1	2	3	4	Total
Aggies	0	3	0	7	10
Spartans	0	10	10	7	27

=== Idaho ===
	1	2	3	4	Total
Vandals	0	2	9	7	18
Spartans	7	7	9	3	26

== Coaching staff ==
Name	Position	Seasons at San Jose State	Alma mater
Dick Tomey	Head coach	1st	DePauw (1960)
Keith Burns	Defensive coordinator	2nd	Arkansas (1982)
Brent Brennan	Wide receivers/Recruiting coordinator	1st	UCLA (1996)
Ken Margerum	Offensive coordinator/Quarterbacks	1st	Stanford (1981)
Dave Fipp	Co-defensive coordinator & safeties	1st	Arizona (1997)
Marcus Arroyo	Graduate Assistant	2nd	San Jose State (2003)
