= Nick Holt =

American football player and coach (born 1962)

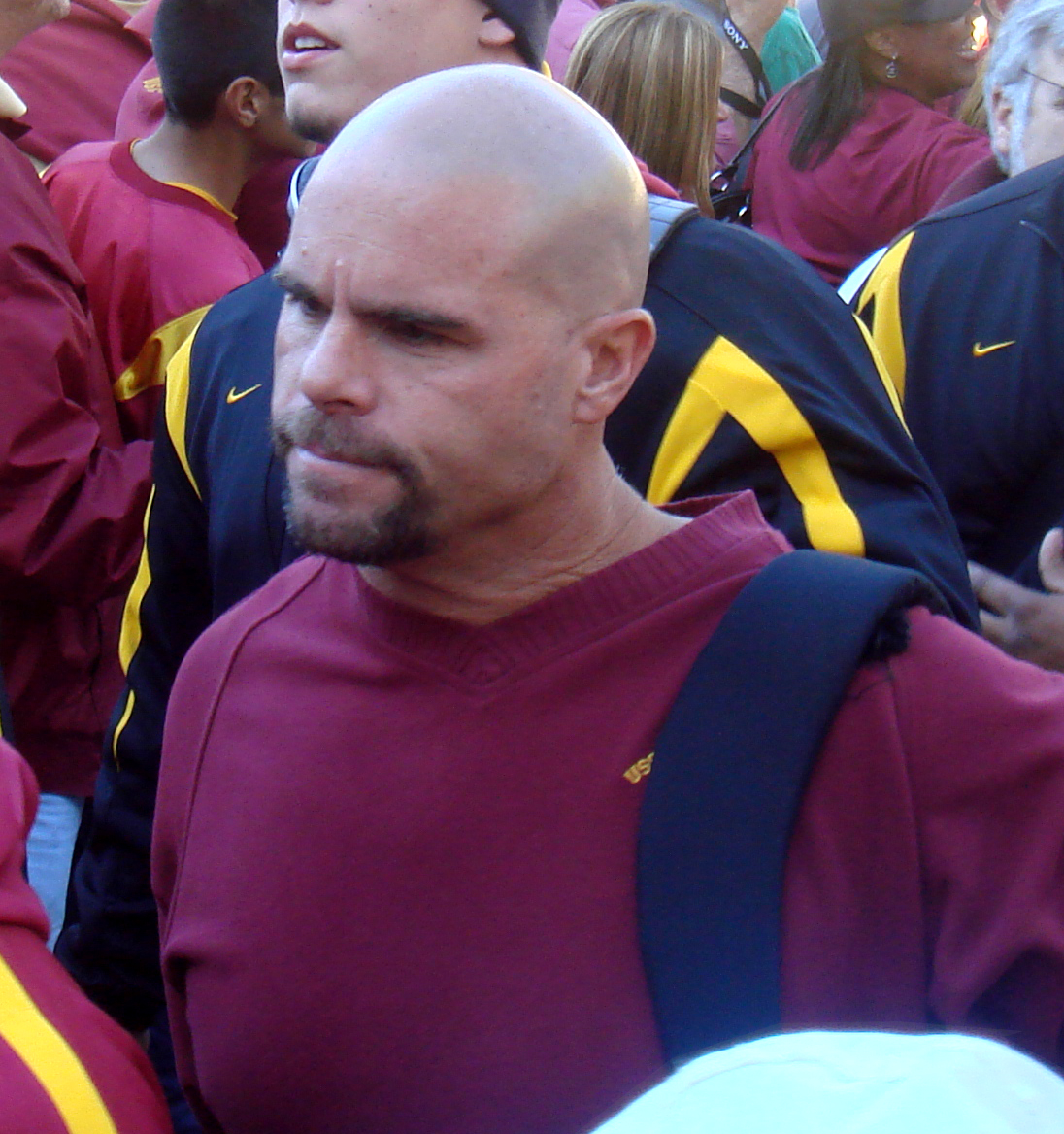
- Holt in 2007

Current position
- Title: Assistant head coach & co-defensive coordinator
- Team: Abilene Christian
- Conference: UAC

Biographical details
- Born: October 15, 1962 (age 64)

Playing career
- 1981–1985: Pacific (CA)
- Position: Linebacker

Coaching career (HC unless noted)
- 1986: St. Mary's HS (CA) (DC)
- 1987: UNLV (GA)
- 1988–1989: UNLV (DL)
- 1990–1993: Idaho (DL)
- 1994: Idaho (DC/DL)
- 1995–1997: Idaho (DC/LB)
- 1998–2000: Louisville (DL)
- 2001–2003: USC (LB)
- 2004–2005: Idaho
- 2006–2008: USC (DC/DL)
- 2009–2011: Washington (AHC/DC)
- 2012: Arkansas (RC)
- 2013: Western Kentucky (DC)
- 2014–2016: Western Kentucky (AHC/DC)
- 2016: Western Kentucky (interim HC)
- 2017–2019: Purdue (co-DC/LB)
- 2020: Skorpions Varese
- 2021: Texas Tech (off. analyst)
- 2025–present: Abilene Christian (AHC/co-DC)

Head coaching record
- Overall: 6–18 (college)
- Bowls: 1–0

Nicholas Holt V (born October 15, 1962) is an American football coach who is currently the assistant head coach and co-defensive coordinator at Abilene Christian. He was previously head coach of Skorpions Varese of the Federazione Italiana di American Football in 2020 and an offensive analyst for Texas Tech in 2021. Previously he was co-defensive coordinator and linebackers coach at Purdue University for three seasons from 2017 to 2019. Before that he was the defensive coordinator at Western Kentucky from 2013 to 2016. Earlier in his career, Holt was defensive coordinator and assistant head coach of the Washington Huskies, defensive coordinator and defensive line coach of the USC Trojans, and head coach of the Idaho Vandals from 2004 to 2005.

== Education ==
Holt attended high school at Bellarmine College Preparatory in San Jose, California, where he played football and baseball and graduated in 1981. He enrolled at the University of the Pacific in Stockton, where he played linebacker and lettered for four years for the Tigers, redshirting in 1982 due to injury. In his senior season of 1985, Holt was an All-American honorable mention, Pacific's MVP and a team captain. During the 1983 season, Pacific's offensive coordinator and assistant head coach was alumnus Pete Carroll, whom Holt later worked under at USC. Holt graduated from UOP in 1986 with a bachelor's degree in political economics.

== Coaching career ==
In 1986, Holt served as defensive coordinator at St. Mary's High School in Stockton. In 1987, he moved to Las Vegas to coach linebackers at UNLV, serving as a graduate assistant during the first season. In 1990 Holt moved north to serve as the defensive line coach at Idaho under head coach John L. Smith, then Chris Tormey. After eight seasons in Moscow, he moved east in 1998 to Louisville to coach the defensive line under Smith again. After three seasons with the Cardinals, Holt returned west in 2001 to Los Angeles to coach the linebackers at USC under Carroll, where he stayed for three seasons.

=== Idaho ===
Following the 2003 season, Tom Cable was fired after four seasons at Idaho, the first Vandals head coach in 22 years to be dismissed. Holt returned to the Palouse and was hired as the head coach, signing a four-year contract at $205,000 per year. The Vandals went 3–9 in 2004 in their last season in the Sun Belt Conference and 2–9 in 2005, their first season in the WAC.

During his short tenure at Idaho, a game was scheduled between the Vandals and his former Trojans for September 1, 2007. Holt decided to take the game because it offered an opportunity to increase visibility to recruits in the region as well earn Idaho $600,000 for the appearance. However, despite a contract that ran through 2008, Holt departed after two seasons to return to USC, 19 months before the game was played.

=== USC ===
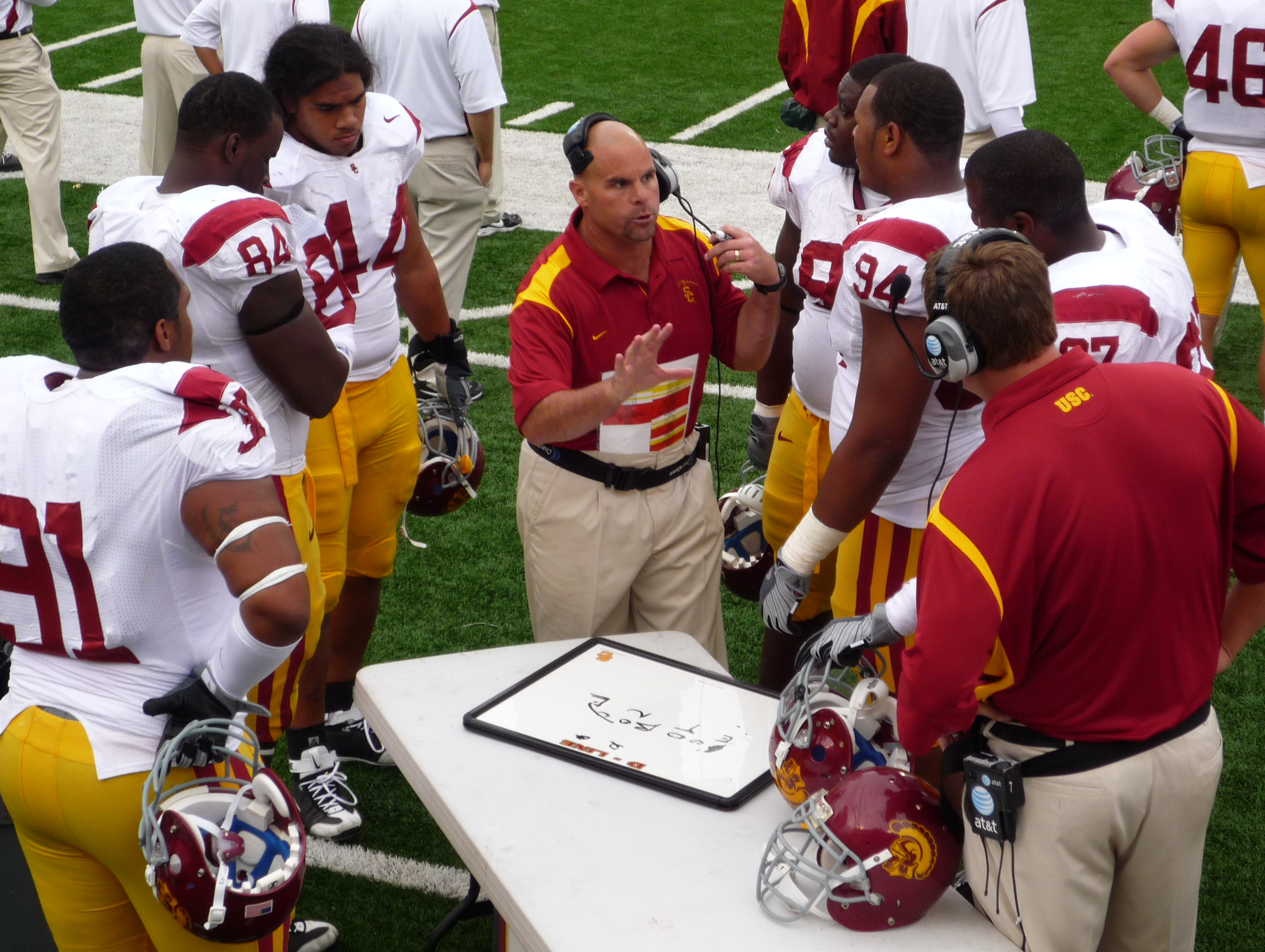
Holt coaching the Trojans in 2008.

When former Idaho quarterback and alumnus Scott Linehan became head coach of the NFL's St. Louis Rams in January 2006, he offered Holt a position as his defensive line coach. The two had coached together under Smith at both Idaho and Louisville. Deciding to make a move before his children entered high school, Holt resigned as head coach from Idaho on February 6, 2006, to take the position with the Rams. This occurred just five days after signing 20 new players to Idaho on national letter of intent day.

After hearing the news, USC head coach Pete Carroll offered his former assistant more money and the position of defensive coordinator. A day later, Holt declined the offer from the Rams (estimated at $320,000 annually, he had not signed a contract) to return to USC, and took over defensive coordinator responsibilities from Carroll. Holt signed a three-year contract exceeding $1.4 million. His second tour at USC also lasted three seasons, while the Trojans posted a 34–5 record (.872).

=== Washington ===
In December 2008, USC Trojans offensive coordinator and colleague Steve Sarkisian was hired as the head coach of the Washington Huskies in Seattle. Sarkisian and Holt coached their final game with the Trojans, the Rose Bowl, on January 1, 2009. On January 5, 2009, Holt accepted the position of defensive coordinator at Washington, taking over for Ed Donatell, who was not retained by Sarkisian. Holt signed a three-year contract valued at $2.1 million.

At the end of Holt's second season at UW in 2010, the Husky defense appeared improved as the team went on a three-game winning streak to finish the regular season and become bowl-eligible, capped with a 19–7 victory over Nebraska in the Holiday Bowl.

==== 2011 season ====
While 2011 saw the emergence of sophomore quarterback Keith Price and improvement on offense, the Huskies were ranked near the bottom in the conference and nationally on defense (of 120 FBS teams: 106th in yards allowed, 108th in points allowed, 116th in passing yards allowed). Washington broke to an early 5–1 record and was bowl-eligible in October, but lost three straight in November before winning the Apple Cup to finish the regular season at 7–5. The five losses were not close games, with copious points and yardage yielded on defense, including 65 points at Stanford, with most of the damage coming from the Cardinal running game, not quarterback Andrew Luck. At the Alamo Bowl, the Huskies faced Baylor, with Heisman Trophy winner Robert Griffin III at quarterback. Similar to the Stanford game, the Huskies generally contained the high-profile quarterback, but were soundly beaten by the rest of the offense. Despite scoring eight touchdowns on offense, the Huskies gave up 67 points and 777 yards on defense, and lost by 11 points. Holt was fired two days later, as were linebackers coach Mike Cox and safeties coach Jeff Mills. All three coaches had contracts through the 2012 season, totaling over $1 million. Cornerbacks coach Demetrice Martin left the staff two weeks earlier for UCLA under new head coach Jim Mora. Johnny Nansen, defensive line and special teams, was the only defensive coach remaining on the UW staff at the end of 2011. The three released coaches were given lump sum payments for the 2012 season: Holt ($650,004), Cox ($220,008), Mills ($155,004). Cox went to Kansas State as the linebackers coach and Mills to New Mexico as defensive coordinator.

=== Arkansas ===
In August 2012, Holt was named the on-campus recruiting coordinator at Arkansas, under new head coach John L. Smith. The position was previously held by Jessica Dorrell, the mistress of fired head coach Bobby Petrino, at a salary of $55,735 per year. Holt was scheduled to receive similar compensation.

=== Western Kentucky ===
On January 2, 2013, Holt was named defensive coordinator at Western Kentucky, under new head coach Bobby Petrino, hired by WKU after Willie Taggart left for South Florida. Holt and Petrino served together on Smith's staff at Idaho in 1990 and 1991 and again at Louisville in 1998. After Petrino left following the 2013 season, Holt turned down the offer to follow Petrino to Louisville, and served the next three seasons at WKU under Jeff Brohm. When Brohm was hired by Purdue in December 2016, Holt was promoted to interim head coach for the Boca Raton Bowl, and the Hilltoppers defeated the Memphis Tigers 51–31. He was considered a candidate for the full-time head coaching job, but Western Kentucky hired Mike Sanford Jr.

=== Purdue ===
Holt followed Brohm to Purdue and was hired as defensive coordinator on January 2, 2017. After three seasons, he was fired on December 9, 2019.

=== Skorpions Varese ===
On October 16, 2020, Skorpions Varese hired Holt as their head coach for the upcoming 2021 season.

=== Texas Tech ===
On August 3, 2021, Holt was hired as an offensive analyst at Texas Tech.

== Personal life ==
Born October 15, 1962, Holt and his wife, Julie Hickey Holt (the latter former women's basketball program head coach at Nevada-Reno, Pacific, Gonzaga, Idaho, and Los Angeles Harbor Junior College), have 2 sons, Nick VI and Ben. Holt's maternal grandfather was Buster Crabbe (1908–83), an All-American swimmer at USC and gold medalist in the 400 m freestyle at the 1932 Olympics who later starred in films such as Tarzan, Flash Gordon, and Buck Rogers.

== Head coaching record ==
=== College ===
Year	Team	Overall	Conference	Standing	Bowl/playoffs
Idaho Vandals (Sun Belt Conference) (2004)
2004	Idaho	3–9	2–5	T–7th	
Idaho Vandals (Western Athletic Conference) (2005)
2005	Idaho	2–9	2–6	T–6th	
Idaho:		5–18	4–11		
Western Kentucky Hilltoppers (Conference USA) (2016)
2016	Western Kentucky	1–0	–	T–1st (East)	W Boca Raton‡
Western Kentucky:		1–0	–	‡ Interim head coach for bowl, replacing Jeff Brohm	
Total:		6–18			
National championship Conference title Conference division title or championship game berth
