= 2005 New Mexico State Aggies football team =

American college football season

2005 New Mexico State Aggies football
- Conference: Western Athletic Conference
- Record: 0–12 (0–8 WAC)
- Head coach: Hal Mumme (1st season)
- Co-offensive coordinators: Gary Goff (1st season); Matt Mumme (1st season)
- Offensive scheme: Air raid
- Defensive coordinator: Woody Widenhofer (1st season)
- Base defense: 4–3
- Home stadium: Aggie Memorial Stadium

2005 Western Athletic Conference football standings
	Conf.			Overall
Team	W		L	W		L
Boise State +	7	–	1	9	–	4
Nevada +	7	–	1	9	–	3
Louisiana Tech	6	–	2	7	–	4
Fresno State	6	–	2	8	–	5
Hawaii	4	–	4	5	–	7
San Jose State	2	–	6	3	–	8
Utah State	2	–	6	3	–	8
Idaho	2	–	6	2	–	9
New Mexico State	0	–	8	0	–	12
+ – Conference co-champions

The 2005 New Mexico State Aggies football team represented New Mexico State University in the 2005 NCAA Division I-A football season. The Aggies were coached by head coach Hal Mumme and played their home games at Aggie Memorial Stadium in Las Cruces, New Mexico. They participated as members of the Western Athletic Conference.

The Aggies struggled as they transitioned from the run-heavy option offense used by previous head coach Tony Samuel to Mumme's pass-heavy air raid offense, finishing the season winless with a 0–12 record and were outscored by opponents 198 to 465, with both the offense (109 of 119) and defense (116 of 119) finishing near last in NCAA Division I-A in points per game. Despite this, the Aggies were competitive in two games, losing by a point to Idaho in double-overtime and losing by three to Utah State.

== Schedule ==
Date	Time	Opponent	Site	TV	Result	Attendance
September 3	8:30 pm	UTEP*	Aggie Memorial Stadium; Las Cruces, NM (Battle of I-10)	ESPNU	L 17–34	30,343
September 10	8:00 pm	at Colorado*	Folsom Field; Boulder, CO	FSN	L 0–39	44,742
September 17	6:00 pm	at New Mexico*	University Stadium; Albuquerque, NM (Rio Grande Rivalry)	SPW	L 21–38	44,760
September 23	8:00 pm	No. 13 California*	Aggie Memorial Stadium; Las Cruces, NM	ESPN	L 13–41	11,312
October 1	5:00 pm	at Louisiana Tech	Joe Aillet Stadium; Ruston, LA		L 14–34	17,318
October 8	8:00 pm	Fresno State	Aggie Memorial Stadium; Las Cruces, NM	ESPNU	L 7–37	8,312
October 15	10:05 pm	at Hawaii	Aloha Stadium; Halawa, HI		L 28–49	29,002
October 29	6:00 pm	Idaho^{†}	Aggie Memorial Stadium; Las Cruces, NM		L 37–38 ^{2OT}	11,325
November 5	1:05 pm	at Boise State	Bronco Stadium; Boise, ID		L 6–56	28,545
November 12	2:00 pm	Nevada	Aggie Memorial Stadium; Las Cruces, NM	SPW	L 24–48	7,345
November 19	4:00 pm	at San Jose State	Spartan Stadium; San Jose, CA	SPW	L 10–27	6,985
November 26	2:00 pm	Utah State	Aggie Memorial Stadium; Las Cruces, NM		L 21–24	6,702
*Non-conference game; ^{†}Homecoming; Rankings from AP Poll released prior to the game; All times are in Mountain time

== Game summaries ==
=== UTEP ===
	1	2	3	4	Total
Miners	14	17	0	3	34
Aggies	0	0	0	17	17

Team	Category	Player	Statistics
UTEP	Passing	Jordan Palmer	15/26, 187 yards, 3 TD
UTEP	Rushing	Tyler Ebell	19 rushes, 63 yards
UTEP	Receiving	Jayson Boyd	3 receptions, 51 yards
New Mexico State	Passing	Royal Gill	36/57, 332 yards, 2 TD, 2 INT
New Mexico State	Rushing	Muammar Ali	7 rushes, 22 yards
New Mexico State	Receiving	Paul Dombrowski	15 receptions, 127 yards, TD

=== At Colorado ===
	1	2	3	4	Total
Aggies	0	0	0	0	0
Buffaloes	7	15	14	3	39

Team	Category	Player	Statistics
New Mexico State	Passing	Royal Gill	17/30, 176 yards, INT
New Mexico State	Rushing	Justine Buries	12 rushes, 26 yards
New Mexico State	Receiving	Paul Dombrowski	3 receptions, 77 yards
Colorado	Passing	Joel Klatt	18/25, 186 yards, 2 TD
Colorado	Rushing	Hugh Charles	21 rushes, 105 yards
Colorado	Receiving	Evan Judge	3 receptions, 48 yards

=== At New Mexico ===
	1	2	3	4	Total
Aggies	0	7	0	14	21
Lobos	7	17	14	0	38

Team	Category	Player	Statistics
New Mexico State	Passing	Royal Gill	7/16, 116 yards, TD, 2 INT
New Mexico State	Rushing	Justine Buries	20 rushes, 115 yards, TD
New Mexico State	Receiving	Paul Dombrowski	4 receptions, 99 yards, TD
New Mexico	Passing	Kole McKamey	12/19, 172 yards, 2 TD, INT
New Mexico	Rushing	Kole McKamey	14 rushes, 152 yards, TD
New Mexico	Receiving	Hank Baskett	3 receptions, 58 yards

=== No. 13 California ===
	1	2	3	4	Total
No. 13 Golden Bears	20	7	0	14	41
Aggies	10	0	3	0	13

Team	Category	Player	Statistics
California	Passing	Joe Ayoob	17/26, 284 yards, TD
California	Rushing	Justin Forsett	31 rushes, 235 yards, TD
California	Receiving	DeSean Jackson	9 receptions, 130 yards, TD
New Mexico State	Passing	Joey Vincent	18/39, 164 yards, 2 INT
New Mexico State	Rushing	Justine Buries	20 rushes, 107 yards
New Mexico State	Receiving	Chris Williams	3 receptions, 45 yards

=== At Louisiana Tech ===
	1	2	3	4	Total
Aggies	0	0	0	14	14
Bulldogs	7	17	10	0	34

Team	Category	Player	Statistics
New Mexico State	Passing	Royal Gill	15/25, 192 yards, TD, 2 INT
New Mexico State	Rushing	Justine Buries	17 rushes, 107 yards
New Mexico State	Receiving	Paul Dombrowski	10 receptions, 81 yards
Louisiana Tech	Passing	Matt Kubik	17/28, 173 yards, 2 TD
Louisiana Tech	Rushing	Mark Dillard	14 rushes, 64 yards, TD
Louisiana Tech	Receiving	Eric Newman	3 receptions, 62 yards

=== Fresno State ===
	1	2	3	4	Total
Bulldogs	17	3	3	14	37
Aggies	0	7	0	0	7

Team	Category	Player	Statistics
Fresno State	Passing	Paul Pinegar	10/19, 112 yards, 2 TD
Fresno State	Rushing	Wendell Mathis	22 rushes, 105 yards, TD
Fresno State	Receiving	Paul Williams	3 receptions, 36 yards
New Mexico State	Passing	Royal Gill	17/31, 105 yards, TD
New Mexico State	Rushing	Justine Buries	14 rushes, 46 yards
New Mexico State	Receiving	A. J. Harris	4 receptions, 28 yards, TD

=== At Hawaii ===
	1	2	3	4	Total
Aggies	7	14	0	7	28
Warriors	14	21	7	7	49

Team	Category	Player	Statistics
New Mexico State	Passing	Royal Gill	34/57, 356 yards, 2 TD, INT
New Mexico State	Rushing	Justine Buries	23 rushes, 99 yards, 2 TD
New Mexico State	Receiving	Nick Cleaver	8 receptions, 103 yards, TD
Hawaii	Passing	Colt Brennan	38/53, 515 yards, 7 TD, INT
Hawaii	Rushing	Colt Brennan	9 rushes, 46 yards
Hawaii	Receiving	Chad Mock	10 receptions, 147 yards, TD

=== Idaho ===
	1	2	3	4	OT	Total
Vandals	14	0	10	6	8	38
Aggies	0	21	3	6	7	37

Team	Category	Player	Statistics
Idaho	Passing	Steven Wichman	35/54, 489 yards, 4 TD, 2 INT
Idaho	Rushing	Rolly Lumbala	21 rushes, 86 yards
Idaho	Receiving	Daniel Smith	11 receptions, 269 yards, 2 TD
New Mexico State	Passing	Joey Vincent	27/43, 340 yards, 3 TD, INT
New Mexico State	Rushing	Justine Buries	26 rushes, 100 yards, TD
New Mexico State	Receiving	Tim Tolbert	7 receptions, 120 yards, TD

=== At Boise State ===
	1	2	3	4	Total
Aggies	6	0	0	0	6
Broncos	7	14	14	21	56

Team	Category	Player	Statistics
New Mexico State	Passing	Joey Vincent	14/38, 115 yards, TD, 3 INT
New Mexico State	Rushing	Joey Vincent	12 rushes, 71 yards
New Mexico State	Receiving	A. J. Harris	5 receptions, 38 yards
Boise State	Passing	Jared Zabransky	13/23, 138 yards, TD, INT
Boise State	Rushing	Lee Marks	18 rushes, 112 yards, TD
Boise State	Receiving	Legedu Naanee	3 receptions, 83 yards

=== Nevada ===
	1	2	3	4	Total
Wolf Pack	10	21	3	14	48
Aggies	0	10	0	14	24

Team	Category	Player	Statistics
Nevada	Passing	Jeff Rowe	22/34, 271 yards, 3 TD, INT
Nevada	Rushing	B. J. Mitchell	34 rushes, 193 yards, 2 TD
Nevada	Receiving	Caleb Spencer	5 receptions, 114 yards, TD
New Mexico State	Passing	Royal Gill	33/47, 357 yards, 3 TD
New Mexico State	Rushing	Justine Buries	14 rushes, 63 yards
New Mexico State	Receiving	Paul Dombrowski	12 receptions, 101 yards

=== At San Jose State ===
	1	2	3	4	Total
Aggies	0	3	0	7	10
Spartans	0	10	10	7	27

Team	Category	Player	Statistics
New Mexico State	Passing	Royal Gill	25/41, 203 yards
New Mexico State	Rushing	Justine Buries	9 rushes, 20 yards
New Mexico State	Receiving	Paul Dombrowski	16 receptions, 133 yards
San Jose State	Passing	Adam Tafralis	20/34, 222 yards
San Jose State	Rushing	Yonus Davis	16 rushes, 150 yards, 2 TD
San Jose State	Receiving	Bryan Watje	4 receptions, 79 yards

=== Utah State ===
	1	2	3	4	Total
USU Aggies	7	7	0	10	24
NMSU Aggies	7	7	0	7	21

Team	Category	Player	Statistics
Utah State	Passing	Jerod Walker	14/20, 182 yards, 2 TD, INT
Utah State	Rushing	Jerod Walker	25 rushes, 102 yards
Utah State	Receiving	Tony Pennyman	5 receptions, 69 yards, 2 TD
New Mexico State	Passing	Joey Vincent	20/32, 214 yards, TD
New Mexico State	Rushing	Justine Buries	22 rushes, 85 yards, TD
New Mexico State	Receiving	Paul Dombrowski	8 receptions, 106 yards
