= 2005 Utah State Aggies football team =

American college football season

2005 Utah State Aggies football
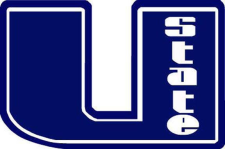
- Conference: Western Athletic Conference
- Record: 3–8 (2–6 WAC)
- Head coach: Brent Guy (1st season)
- Offensive coordinator: Mike Santiago (1st season)
- Defensive coordinator: Mark Johnson (1st season)
- Home stadium: Romney Stadium

2005 Western Athletic Conference football standings
	Conf.			Overall
Team	W		L	W		L
Boise State +	7	–	1	9	–	4
Nevada +	7	–	1	9	–	3
Louisiana Tech	6	–	2	7	–	4
Fresno State	6	–	2	8	–	5
Hawaii	4	–	4	5	–	7
San Jose State	2	–	6	3	–	8
Utah State	2	–	6	3	–	8
Idaho	2	–	6	2	–	9
New Mexico State	0	–	8	0	–	12
+ – Conference co-champions

The 2005 Utah State Aggies football team represented Utah State University as a member of the Western Athletic Conference (WAC) in 2005 NCAA Division I-A football season. The Aggies were led by first-year head coach Brent Guy and played their home games in Romney Stadium in Logan, Utah. The Aggies finished the season 3–8 overall and 2–6 in WAC play to tie for sixth place.

== Schedule ==
Date	Opponent	Site	Result	Attendance
September 10	at Utah*	Rice-Eccles Stadium; Salt Lake City, UT (Battle of the Brothers)	L 7–31	41,884
September 24	UNLV*	Romney Stadium; Logan, UT	W 31–24	12,408
October 1	at Idaho	Kibbie Dome; Moscow, ID	L 13–27	15,006
October 8	San Jose State	Romney Stadium; Logan, UT	W 24–17	12,542
October 15	at Fresno State	Bulldog Stadium; Fresno, CA	L 21–53	42,701
October 22	Boise State	Romney Stadium; Logan, UT	L 21–45	12,922
September 15	at No. 5 Alabama*	Bryant–Denny Stadium; Tuscaloosa, AL	L 3–35	81,018
November 5	Louisiana Tech	Romney Stadium; Logan, UT	L 17–27	9,457
November 12	at Hawaii	Aloha Stadium; Halawa, HI	L 23–50	27,892
November 19	Nevada	Romney Stadium; Logan, UT	L 24–30	7,153
November 26	at New Mexico State	Aggie Memorial Stadium; Las Cruces, NM	W 24–21	6,702
*Non-conference game; Rankings from Coaches' Poll released prior to the game
