= 2005 Louisiana Tech Bulldogs football team =

American college football season

2005 Louisiana Tech Bulldogs football
- Conference: Western Athletic Conference
- Record: 7–4 (6–2 WAC)
- Head coach: Jack Bicknell Jr. (7th season)
- Offensive coordinator: Conroy Hines (6th season)
- Defensive coordinator: Randy Bates (3rd season)
- Captains: Donald Allen; Aaron Lips; Barry Robertson; Bryan Santiago; Tramon Williams; Quarvay Winbush
- Home stadium: Joe Aillet Stadium

2005 Western Athletic Conference football standings
	Conf.			Overall
Team	W		L	W		L
Boise State +	7	–	1	9	–	4
Nevada +	7	–	1	9	–	3
Louisiana Tech	6	–	2	7	–	4
Fresno State	6	–	2	8	–	5
Hawaii	4	–	4	5	–	7
San Jose State	2	–	6	3	–	8
Utah State	2	–	6	3	–	8
Idaho	2	–	6	2	–	9
New Mexico State	0	–	8	0	–	12
+ – Conference co-champions

The 2005 Louisiana Tech Bulldogs football team represented Louisiana Tech University as a member of the Western Athletic Conference (WAC) during the 2005 NCAA Division I-A football season. Led by seventh-year head coach Jack Bicknell Jr., the Bulldogs played their home games at Joe Aillet Stadium in Ruston, Louisiana. Louisiana Tech finished the season with a record of 7–4 overall and a mark of 6–2 in conference play, tying for third place in the WAC.

== Schedule ==
Date	Time	Opponent	Site	TV	Result	Attendance
September 10	5:00 pm	at No. 10 Florida*	Ben Hill Griffin Stadium; Gainesville, FL	PPV	L 3–41	90,099
September 17	6:00 pm	at Kansas*	Memorial Stadium; Lawrence, KS		L 14–34	41,237
October 1	6:00 pm	New Mexico State	Joe Aillet Stadium; Ruston, LA		W 34–14	17,318
October 8	6:00 pm	Hawaii	Joe Aillet Stadium; Ruston, LA	ESPN Plus	W 46–14	16,242
October 15	3:00 pm	at Nevada	Mackay Stadium; Reno, NV		L 27–37	8,377
October 22	3:00 pm	North Texas*^{†}	Joe Aillet Stadium; Ruston, LA		W 40–14	19,481
October 29	6:00 pm	San Jose State	Joe Aillet Stadium; Ruston, LA		W 31–14	12,758
November 5	2:00 pm	at Utah State	Romney Stadium; Logan, UT	ESPN Plus	W 27–17	9,457
November 12	4:00 pm	at Idaho	Kibbie Dome; Moscow, ID	SPW	W 41–38	15,012
November 26	1:00 pm	Boise State	Joe Aillet Stadium; Ruston, LA	SPW	L 13–30	16,281
December 2	8:00 pm	at No. 23 Fresno State	Bulldog Stadium; Fresno, CA	ESPN2	W 40–28	36,525
*Non-conference game; ^{†}Homecoming; Rankings from AP Poll released prior to the game; All times are in Central time
