= 2005 Idaho Vandals football team =

American college football season

2005 Idaho Vandals football
- Conference: Western Athletic Conference
- Record: 2–9 (2–6 WAC)
- Head coach: Nick Holt (2nd season)
- Co-offensive coordinators: Nate Kaczor (2nd season); Joel Thomas (2nd season)
- Offensive scheme: Multiple
- Base defense: 3–4
- Home stadium: Kibbie Dome

2005 Western Athletic Conference football standings
	Conf.			Overall
Team	W		L	W		L
Boise State +	7	–	1	9	–	4
Nevada +	7	–	1	9	–	3
Louisiana Tech	6	–	2	7	–	4
Fresno State	6	–	2	8	–	5
Hawaii	4	–	4	5	–	7
San Jose State	2	–	6	3	–	8
Utah State	2	–	6	3	–	8
Idaho	2	–	6	2	–	9
New Mexico State	0	–	8	0	–	12
+ – Conference co-champions

The 2005 Idaho Vandals football team represented the University of Idaho during the 2005 NCAA Division I-A football season. Idaho competed as a first-year member of the Western Athletic Conference (WAC), and played their home games in the Kibbie Dome, an indoor facility on campus in Moscow, Idaho. The Vandals were led by second-year head coach Nick Holt, and finished their first season in the WAC with a 2–9 overall record and 2–6 in conference play, the sixth consecutive season with a losing record.

The Vandals played the previous four seasons (2001–2004) as a "football only" member of the Sun Belt Conference, following the discontinuation of football by the Big West. Other new teams in the WAC in 2005 were New Mexico State and Utah State.

After the season, Holt departed for an assistant's position in the NFL in February 2006, joining the staff of the St. Louis Rams as defensive line coach under first-year head coach Scott Linehan, a former Vandal player and assistant coach. Holt and Linehan had coached together as assistants at both Idaho and Louisville under John L. Smith. Days later, Holt changed his mind and accepted a higher-paying offer as defensive coordinator back at USC under head coach Pete Carroll.

Former Idaho head coach Dennis Erickson, recently of the San Francisco 49ers, succeeded Holt for the 2006 season.

== Schedule ==
Date	Time	Opponent	Site	Result	Attendance
September 1	7:00 pm	at Washington State*	Martin Stadium; Pullman, WA (Battle of the Palouse)	L 26–38	38,339
September 10	6:00 pm	at UNLV*	Sam Boyd Stadium; Whitney, NV	L 31–34	21,870
September 17	12:30 pm	at Washington*	Husky Stadium; Seattle, WA	L 6–34	61,183
September 24	7:00 pm	Hawaii	Kibbie Dome; Moscow, ID	L 0–24	15,635
October 1	2:00 pm	Utah State^{†}	Kibbie Dome; Moscow, ID	W 27–13	15,006
October 8	1:05 pm	at Nevada	Mackay Stadium; Reno, NV	L 14–62	11,584
October 22	2:00 pm	No. 24 Fresno State	Kibbie Dome; Moscow, ID	L 10–40	15,047
October 29	5:00 pm	at New Mexico State	Aggie Memorial Stadium; Las Cruces, NM	W 38–37 ^{2OT}	11,325
November 12	2:00 pm	Louisiana Tech	Kibbie Dome; Moscow, ID	L 38–41	15,012
November 19	1:05 pm	at Boise State	Bronco Stadium; Boise, ID (Governor's Trophy)	L 35–70	30,394
November 26	3:00 pm	at San José State	Spartan Stadium; San Jose, CA	L 18–26	8,045
*Non-conference game; ^{†}Homecoming; Rankings from AP Poll released prior to the game; All times are in Pacific time

Idaho's reported home attendance for 2005 was 60,700 for four games.
The maximum was 15,635 for the Hawaii game on September 24,
the minimum was 15,006 for the Utah State game on October 1.
