= Dave Fipp =

American football coach (born 1974)

Detroit Lions
- Title: Special teams coordinator

Personal information
- Born: August 8, 1974 (age 52); Albuquerque, New Mexico, U.S.

Career information
- Position: Safety
- High school: La Jolla (CA)
- College: Arizona (1994-1997)

Career history
- Holy Cross (1998–1999) Special teams coordinator & secondary coach; Arizona (2000) Graduate assistant; Cal Poly (2001) Secondary coach; Cal Poly (2002–2003) Defensive coordinator; Nevada (2004) Co-defensive coordinator; San Jose State (2005–2006) Co-defensive coordinator & safeties coach; San Jose State (2007) Defensive coordinator; San Francisco 49ers (2008–2010) Assistant special teams coach; Miami Dolphins (2011–2012) Assistant special teams coach; Philadelphia Eagles (2013–2020) Special teams coordinator; Detroit Lions (2021–present) Special teams coordinator

Awards and highlights
- Super Bowl champion (LII)

Dave Fipp (born August 8, 1974) is an American football coach who is the special teams coordinator for the Detroit Lions of the National Football League (NFL).

== Early life ==
Fipp attended La Jolla High School, in La Jolla, California, and graduated in 1993. In addition to playing football for the La Jolla High School Vikings, Fipp was a ranked pole vaulter in the state of California and at one time held La Jolla's record with a mark of 15’5”.

== College career ==
A 1997 graduate from the University of Arizona, Fipp played for the Arizona Wildcats football team under head coach Dick Tomey from 1994 to 1997. As a walk-on, Fipp led Arizona's special teams unit in tackles as a sophomore in 1995. He received a scholarship prior to the 1996 season and was the Wildcats’ starting free safety in 1996 and 1997. The 1997 Wildcats were among the top defensive units in the Pacific-10 Conference and ranked 12th nationally in rushing defense. He graduated from Arizona with a bachelor's degree in family studies in 1997.

== Coaching career ==
Fipp began his coaching career at Holy Cross as a secondary coach and special teams coordinator in 1998. He returned to his alma mater, the University of Arizona, for the 2000 season as a graduate assistant and coached the safeties. When former Arizona defensive coordinator Rich Ellerson took the head coaching position at Cal Poly in 2001, he brought Fipp with him as his secondary coach. Fipp was promoted to defensive coordinator for the following two seasons before he left to take the same role at University of Nevada. Fipp spent the 2004 season at Nevada working for Hall of Fame coach Chris Ault as the co-defensive coordinator and secondary coach. The Wolf Pack's pass defense was 21st nationally and third in the Western Athletic Conference in yardage allowed.

Fipp left Nevada for San Jose State as one of Dick Tomey's first hires after Tomey was named head coach in December 2004. In 2005 and 2006, Fipp was the co-defensive coordinator and safeties coach before being named the defensive coordinator for the 2007 season. During his three seasons working with the Spartans’ defense, San Jose State yielded an average of 27.2 points a game including just 20.8 points a contest in 2006, the fewest given up by the program in 16 years. San Jose State's defense allowed 37.8 points a game in the three seasons prior to Fipp's arrival. In 2006, the Spartans kept five teams scoreless in the second half as San Jose State went on a 9–4 win–loss record and the 2006 New Mexico Bowl title.

One of the youngest defensive coordinators in the NCAA's Football Bowl Subdivision, Fipp accumulated six seasons as a defensive or co-defensive coordinator at NCAA programs before leaving to coach in the NFL prior to the 2008 season.

Fipp spent three years with the San Francisco 49ers as assistant special teams coach. The 49ers credit Fipp as playing a critical role in the team's excellent special teams play. In 2009, Punter Andy Lee earned his second Pro Bowl selection after ranking 2nd in the NFL in gross punting average (47.6) and net punting average (41.0). Running Back Michael Robinson was named a Pro Bowl alternate as a specialist for his work in all phases of special teams, marking the second consecutive season he had earned the recognition. Kicker Joe Nedney continued his successful career with Fipp's guidance, finishing the 2009 season ranked 38th on the NFL's all-time scoring list with 1,063 points.

In January 2011 Fipp joined the Miami Dolphins staff as assistant special teams coach. According to rankings compiled annually by The Dallas Morning News, the Dolphins finished the 2011 season ranked 2nd for overall special teams performance. Ranked 24th in 2010, the Dolphins 2011 second-place ranking represents the greatest year-to-year improvement of any team in the league. The Dolphins finished 4th in the 2012 rankings, making them the only team to finish in the top five over the past two years.

In January 2013, Fipp was hired by Chip Kelly as the Philadelphia Eagles special teams coordinator, replacing Bobby April. Since taking over in 2013, the Eagles’ special teams units have accounted for 12 touchdowns, leading the NFL in the past six seasons. During this period, Fipp's special teams units were also first in blocked punts for touchdowns (4) and first in total kicks and or punts blocked (4) while finishing second in committing the fewest special teams penalties, second in number of punts blocked (7) and second in total number of blocked kicks including punts, field goal and extra point attempts (16). In this same period, Fipp's units finished third in total number of punts returned for touchdowns (4), kickoff returns for touchdowns (4) and total returns for touchdowns (8).

In his second year with the Eagles, Fipp's unit was recognized by the Dallas Morning News' annual rankings as the top special teams in the league. The 2014 unit accounted for a franchise-best and NFL-leading seven touchdowns (three blocked punt returns, two kickoff returns and two punt returns) and a league-best six blocked kicks. The Eagles special teams unit again finished in the top five following the 2015 season, ranked fifth according to the Dallas Morning News' annual rankings. During the 2016 season, Fipp's special team's unit set an Eagles' franchise record in the return game with a 27.314 kickoff return average, ranking second in the NFL. They led the league with 5 kickoff returns of greater than 50 yards, and were the only team to score multiple touchdowns on kickoff returns with two. The Eagles also finished second in the NFL in punt return average with 12.9. Following the 2016 season, Fipp's group was again rated the top special teams unit in the NFL by the Dallas Morning News' annual rankings, finishing first in two of the past three seasons. Fipp won his first Super Bowl ring when the Eagles defeated the New England Patriots in Super Bowl LII.

In 2021, Fipp was hired to the role of special teams coordinator with the Detroit Lions. In his first two years with the team, the Lions ranked #7 and #6 in Rick Gosselin's special teams rankings.

== Personal life ==
Fipp lives in Birmingham, Michigan, with his wife, Jenny, and their three children: daughters Ashlee and Lilly and son Tyler.
