= 2005 Boise State Broncos football team =

American college football season

2005 Boise State Broncos football

WAC co-champion

MPC Computers Bowl, L 21–27 vs. Boston College
- Conference: Western Athletic Conference
- Record: 9–4 (7–1 WAC)
- Head coach: Dan Hawkins (5th season)
- Offensive coordinator: Chris Petersen (5th season)
- Defensive coordinator: Ron Collins
- Home stadium: Bronco Stadium (Capacity: 30,000)

2005 Western Athletic Conference football standings
	Conf.			Overall
Team	W		L	W		L
Boise State +	7	–	1	9	–	4
Nevada +	7	–	1	9	–	3
Louisiana Tech	6	–	2	7	–	4
Fresno State	6	–	2	8	–	5
Hawaii	4	–	4	5	–	7
San Jose State	2	–	6	3	–	8
Utah State	2	–	6	3	–	8
Idaho	2	–	6	2	–	9
New Mexico State	0	–	8	0	–	12
+ – Conference co-champions

The 2005 Boise State Broncos football team represented Boise State University during the 2005 NCAA Division I-A football season. Boise State competed as a member of the Western Athletic Conference (WAC), and played their home games at Bronco Stadium in Boise, Idaho. The Broncos were led by fifth-year head coach Dan Hawkins. He resigned at the end of the regular season to take the head coaching job at Colorado, but remained to coach the Broncos in their bowl game. The Broncos finished the season 9–4 and 7–1 in conference to win their fourth straight WAC title (shared with Nevada) and played in the MPC Computers Bowl, where they lost to Boston College, 27–21.

== Schedule ==
Date	Time	Opponent	Rank	Site	TV	Result	Attendance	Source
September 3	3:30 pm	at No. 13 Georgia*	No. 18	Sanford Stadium; Athens, GA	ESPN	L 13–48	92,746	
September 10	4:30 pm	at Oregon State*		Reser Stadium; Corvallis, OR	FSN	L 27–30	42,876	
September 21	6:00 pm	Bowling Green*		Bronco Stadium; Boise, ID	ESPN2	W 48–20	30,561	
October 1	10:00 pm	at Hawaii		Aloha Stadium; Halawa, HI	KTVB	W 44–41	31,695	
October 8	6:05 pm	Portland State*^{†}		Bronco Stadium; Boise, ID	KTVB	W 21–14	30,603	
October 15	6:05 pm	San Jose State		Bronco Stadium; Boise, ID	KTVB	W 38–21	30,342	
October 22	4:35 pm	at Utah State		Romney Stadium; Logan, UT	KTVB	W 45–21	12,922	
October 29	1:05 pm	Nevada		Bronco Stadium; Boise, ID (rivalry)	SPW	W 49–14	29,843	
November 5	1:05 pm	New Mexico State		Bronco Stadium; Boise, ID	KTVB	W 56–6	28,545	
November 10	6:00 pm	at No. 20 Fresno State		Bulldog Stadium; Fresno, CA (rivalry)	ESPN	L 7–27	42,781	
November 19	1:05 pm	Idaho		Bronco Stadium; Boise, ID (rivalry)	KTVB	W 70–35	30,394	
November 26	12:00 pm	at Louisiana Tech		Joe Aillet Stadium; Ruston, LA	SPW	W 30–13	16,281	
December 28	2:30 pm	No. 19 Boston College*		Bronco Stadium; Boise, ID (MPC Computers Bowl)	ESPN	L 21–27	30,493	
*Non-conference game; ^{†}Homecoming; Rankings from AP Poll released prior to the game; All times are in Mountain time
