= Anthony Pudewell =

American football player (born 1983)

No. 83
- Position: Tight end

Personal information
- Born: April 6, 1983 (age 43); Sacramento County, California, U.S.
- Listed height: 6 ft 4 in (1.93 m)
- Listed weight: 250 lb (113 kg)

Career information
- College: Nevada
- NFL draft: 2007: undrafted

Career history
- Jacksonville Jaguars (2007)

Anthony Pudewell (born April 6, 1983) is an American former football tight end who played for the Nevada Wolf Pack from 2003 to 2006.

== College career ==
Pudewell attended Oak Ridge High School in El Dorado County, California, where he played football as a tight end.

As a high school senior, Pudewell committed to the University of Nevada in February 2001. He played tight end for the Nevada Wolf Pack football team in the Western Athletic Conference from 2003 to 2006. During the 2003 season, Pudewell caught 12 passes for 123 yards and two touchdowns. In a November 2004 game against the undefeated 2004 Boise State football team, Pudewell caught six passes for 96 yards. During the 2005 season, Pudewell caught 27 passes for 308 yards and two touchdowns. In 2006, he caught 17 passes for 147 yards and two touchdowns and was selected to play in the Hula Bowl all-star game in Honolulu.

== Professional career ==
Pudewell was signed in May 2007 as an undrafted free agent by the Jacksonville Jaguars. He was placed on injured reserve in August 2007. Pudwell was waived by the Jaguars on March 20, 2008.
