= Jayson Rego =

US international rugby league player

Personal information
- Born: Honolulu, Hawaii

Playing information
- Position: Fullback, Wing
Representative
Years	Team	Pld	T	G	FG	P
	United States
- Source: RLP

Jayson Rego is a professional American rugby league player for the Ipswich Jets in the Queensland Cup. He has played Div.1 college football for the Hawaii Warriors football team as a running back. He is a United States national rugby league team international. Also selected to the 2011 All-American 7's team. His position is fullback and wing.
