= Air Force Falcons football statistical leaders =

The Air Force Falcons football statistical leaders are individual statistical leaders of the Air Force Falcons football program in various categories, including passing, rushing, receiving, total offense, defensive stats, and kicking. Within those areas, the lists identify single-game, single-season, and career leaders. The Falcons represent the United States Air Force Academy (USAFA) in the NCAA's Mountain West Conference.

Although Air Force began competing in intercollegiate football in 1955, these lists are dominated by more recent players for several reasons:

- Since 1955, seasons have increased from 10 games to 11 and then 12 games in length.
- The NCAA didn't allow freshmen to play varsity football until 1972, allowing players to have four-year careers.
- Bowl games only began counting toward single-season and career statistics in 2002. The Falcons have played in nine bowl games since this decision, giving recent players an extra game to accumulate statistics.
- Due to COVID-19 disruptions, the NCAA ruled that the 2020 season would not count against the eligibility of any football player. While the service academies generally do not redshirt players, the Department of the Air Force allowed the USAFA to give its cadet athletes an extra season of eligibility. (Army was given this same option, but Navy was not.)

The values on these list are often smaller than the values seen on other programs' lists for several reasons:

- Air Force has only played since 1955, making it a relatively new college football program.
- The Air Force Academy is a four-year undergraduate program, so it does not redshirt players under normal circumstances. This means that for a player to play for four years, he must be good enough to see the field as a true freshman. Relatively few players are prepared to do this, which depresses career records.
- Air Force has run a triple option offense since the arrival of head coach Ken Hatfield in 1978. This offense emphasizes running over passing. Most passing records were established in the 24-year period before this time.

These lists are updated through the end of the 2025 season.

== Passing ==
=== Passing completions ===
Career
Rank	Player	Completions	Attempts	Years
1	Dave Ziebart	424	879	1976 1977 1978 1979
2	Shaun Carney	393	635	2004 2005 2006 2007
3	Rich Mayo	316	623	1957 1958 1959 1960
4	Rich Haynie	299	662	1971 1972 1973
5	Tim Jefferson	290	515	2008 2009 2010 2011
6	Gary Baxter	262	572	1967 1968 1969
7	Beau Morgan	226	438	1994 1995 1996
8	Bob Parker	211	431	1969 1970
9	Marty Louthan	179	385	1980 1981 1982 1983
10	Rob Shaw	170	343	1974 1975 1976

Completion %(minimum 100 completions)
Rank	Player	Completion %	Years
1	Shaun Carney	61.9%	2004 2005 2006 2007
2	Connor Dietz	58.5%	2009 2010 2011 2012
3	Kale Pearson	56.7%	2012 2013 2014
4	Tim Jefferson	56.3%	2008 2009 2010 2011
5	Mike Thiessen	54.0%	1998 1999 2000
6	Blane Morgan	52.8%	1996 19971998
7	Bart Weiss	51.7%	1983 19841985
8	Beau Morgan	51.6%	1994 1995 1996
9	Keith Boyea	51.5%	2000 2001
10	Rich Mayo	50.7%	1957 1958 1959 1960

=== Passing yards ===
Career
Rank	Player	Yards	Years
1	Shaun Carney	5,391	2004 2005 2006 2007
2	Dave Ziebart	4,789	1976 1977 1978 1979
3	Tim Jefferson	4,599	2008 2009 2010 2011
4	Rich Haynie	4,283	1971 1972 1973
5	Rich Mayo	3,399	1957 1958 1959 1960
6	Gary Baxter	3,362	1967 1968 1969
7	Beau Morgan	3,248	1994 1995 1996
8	Marty Louthan	3,137	1980 1981 1982 1983
9	Bob Parker	2,996	1969 1970
10	Dee Dowis	2,870	1986 1987 1988 1989

Single season
Rank	Player	Yards	Year
1	Bob Parker	2,789	1970
2	Gary Baxter	1,783	1969
3	Mike Thiessen	1,687	2000
4	Tim Jefferson	1,637	2011
5	Karson Roberts	1,595	2015
6	Kale Pearson	1,590	2014
7	Rich Haynie	1,570	1972
8	Dave Ziebart	1,562	1977
9	Shaun Carney	1,491	2007
10	Tim Jefferson	1,459	2010

Single game
Rank	Player	Yards	Years	Opponent
1	Bob Parker	391	1970	Wyoming
2	Gary Baxter	388	1969	Wyoming
3	Bob Parker	375	1970	Colorado State
4	Dave Ziebart	339	1976	Wyoming
5	Donald Hammond III	327	2019	New Mexico
6	Rob Shaw	314	1976	Pacific
7	Dave Ziebart	311	1977	Baylor
8	Dee Dowis	306	1989	Notre Dame
9	Bob Parker	301	1970	Oregon

=== Passing touchdowns ===
Career
Rank	Player	TDs	Years
1	Shaun Carney	39	2004 2005 2006 2007
2	Tim Jefferson	34	2008 2009 2010 2011
3	Rich Haynie	34	1971 1972 1973
4	Dave Ziebart	27	1976 1977 1978 1979
5	Beau Morgan	25	1994 1995 1996
6	Bob Parker	25	1969 1970
7	Rich Mayo	24	1957 1958 1959 1960
8	Gary Baxter	21	1967 1968 1969
9	Mike Thiessen	18	1998 1999 2000
	Dee Dowis	18	1986 1987 1988 1989
	Donald Hammond III	18	2018 2019

Single season
Rank	Player	TDs	Year
1	Bob Parker	21	1970
2	Rich Haynie	17	1972
3	Tim Jefferson	14	2011
	Kale Pearson	14	2014
5	Gary Baxter	13	1969
	Mike Thiessen	13	2000
	Donald Hammond III	13	2019
8	Beau Morgan	12	1995
	Shaun Carney	12	2006
10	Rich Mayo	11	1958
	Shaun Carney	11	2004
	Karson Roberts	11	2015

Single game
Rank	Player	TDs	Years	Opponent
1	Adam Fitch	5	2005	BYU
2	Paul Stein	4	1965	Arizona
	Rich Haynie	4	1972	Arizona State
	Mike Thiessen	4	2000	BYU
	Shaun Carney	4	2006	UNLV
	Donald Hammond III	4	2019	New Mexico
7	21 times	3	Most recent: Liam Szarka, 2025 vs. Hawai'i	

== Rushing ==
=== Rushing yards ===
Career
Rank	Player	Yards	Years
1	Dee Dowis	3,612	1986 1987 1988 1989
2	Brad Roberts	3,545	2020 2021 2022
3	Asher Clark	3,594	2008 2009 2010 2011
4	Beau Morgan	3,379	1994 1995 1996
5	Jacobi Owens	3,005	2014 2015 2016
6	John Kershner	2,726	1980 1981 1982 1983
7	Chad Hall	2,606	2005 2006 2007
8	Shaun Carney	2,561	2004 2005 2006 2007
9	Chance Harridge	2,324	2001 2002 2003
10	Brian Bream	2,284	1969 1970 1971
	Pat Evans	2,284	1984 1985 1986

Single season
Rank	Player	Yards	Year
1	Brad Roberts	1,728	2022
2	Beau Morgan	1,494	1996
3	Chad Hall	1,478	2007
4	Brad Roberts	1,356	2021
5	Dee Dowis	1,315	1987
6	Dee Dowis	1,286	1989
7	Beau Morgan	1,285	1995
8	Brian Bream	1,276	1970
9	Cody Getz	1,248	2012
10	Chance Harridge	1,229	2002

Single game
Rank	Player	Yards	Years	Opponent
1	Chad Hall	275	2007	Army
2	Anthony LaCoste	263	2013	Army
3	Cole Fagan	260	2018	Colorado State
4	Chad Hall	256	2007	Colorado St
5	Dee Dowis	249	1989	San Diego State
6	Beau Morgan	243	1996	Colorado State
7	Dee Dowis	241	1987	Utah
8	Jacobi Owens	233	2014	Nicholls State
9	Cody Getz	222	2012	Colorado State
10	DeAndre Hughes	221	2021	Nevada

=== Rushing touchdowns ===
Career
Rank	Player	TDs	Years
1	Beau Morgan	42	1994 1995 1996
2	Dee Dowis	41	1986 1987 1988 1989
3	Greg Johnson	35	1986 1987 1988 1989
	Chance Harridge	35	2001 2002 2003
	Brad Roberts	35	2020 2021 2022
6	Tim Jefferson	33	2008 2009 2010 2011
7	Shaun Carney	31	2004 2005 2006 2007
8	Marty Louthan	30	1980 1981 1982 1983
9	Timothy McVey	26	2015 2016 2017
10	Brian Bream	24	1969 1970 1971
	Asher Clark	24	2008 2009 2010 2011

Single season
Rank	Player	TDs	Year
1	Chance Harridge	22	2002
2	Brian Bream	19	1970
	Beau Morgan	19	1995
4	Dee Dowis	18	1989
	Beau Morgan	18	1996
	Keith Boyea	18	2001
7	Brad Roberts	17	2022
8	Marty Louthan	16	1983
	Greg Johnson	16	1988
	Greg Johnson	16	1989

Single game
Rank	Player	TDs	Years	Opponent
1	Dee Dowis	6	1989	San Diego State
2	Marty Louthan	5	1983	Navy
3	15 times	4	Most recent: Kemper Hodges, 2026 vs. UConn	

== Receiving ==
=== Receptions ===
Career
Rank	Player	Rec	Years
1	Ernie Jennings	148	1968 1969 1970
2	Jalen Robinette	120	2013 2014 2015 2016
3	Mike Kirby	106	1980 1981 1982 1983
4	Charlie Longnecker	100	1967 1968 1969
5	Matt Farmer	92	1997 1998 1999
6	Ryan Fleming	88	1999 2000 2001
7	Paul Williams	81	1975 1976 1977
8	Chad Hall	77	2005 2006 2007
9	Bob Brickey	73	1957 1958 1959 1960
10	Steve Hoog	71	1975 1976 1977 1978

Single season
Rank	Player	Rec	Year
1	Ernie Jennings	74	1970
2	Cormac Carney	57	1978
3	Mike Bolen	53	1970
4	Ryan Fleming	52	2000
5	Ernie Jennings	51	1969
6	Chad Hall	50	2007
7	Jason Brown	49	2005
8	Andy Bark	47	1980
9	Charlie Longnecker	45	1968
	Paul Williams	45	1976

Single game
Rank	Player	Rec	Years	Opponent
1	Ernie Jennings	15	1969	Wyoming
2	Mike Bolen	14	1970	Colorado
3	Ernie Jennings	13	1970	Stanford
4	Charles Longnecker	11	1970	Stanford
	Cormac Carney	11	1978	Georgia Tech
6	Bob Brickey	10	1959	Trinity
	Bob Farr	10	1974	BYU
	Mike Fortson	10	1979	Navy
	Ryan Fleming	10	2000	New Mexico
	Alec Messerall	10	2004	Navy

=== Receiving yards ===
Career
Rank	Player	Yards	Years
1	Jalen Robinette	2,697	2013 2014 2015 2016
2	Ernie Jennings	2,392	1968 1969 1970
3	Mike Kirby	1,909	1980 1981 1982 1983
4	Ryan Fleming	1,515	1999 2000 2001
5	Matt Farmer	1,504	1997 1998 1999
6	Garrett Brown	1,334	2012 2013 2014 2015
7	Charlie Longnecker	1,312	1967 1968 1969
8	Steve Hoog	1,199	1975 1976 1977 1978
9	Geraud Sanders	1,176	2017 2018 2019
	Cade Harris	1,176	2022 2023 2024 2025

Single season
Rank	Player	Yards	Year
1	Ernie Jennings	1,289	1970
2	Jalen Robinette	959	2016
3	Ryan Fleming	930	2000
4	Jason Brown	874	2005
5	Cormac Carney	870	1978
6	Ken Carpenter	869	1985
7	Mike Kirby	862	1983
8	Jalen Robinette	806	2014
9	Andy Bark	794	1980
10	Geraud Sanders	746	2019

Single game
Rank	Player	Yards	Years	Opponent
1	Ernie Jennings	235	1970	Wyoming
2	Cormac Carney	220	1978	Georgia Tech
3	Jalen Robinette	210	2015	Utah State
4	Frank Murphy	198	1972	Arizona State
5	Jason Brown	184	2005	Utah
6	Jalen Robinette	182	2016	New Mexico
7	Mike Kirby	179	1983	BYU
8	Cade Harris	177	2025	Boise State
9	Ernie Jennings	175	1969	Utah State
10	Ernie Jennings	174	1970	Stanford

=== Receiving touchdowns ===
Career
Rank	Player	TDs	Years
1	Ernie Jennings	28	1968 1969 1970
2	Jalen Robinette	18	2013 2014 2015 2016
3	Frank Murphy	13	1971 1972 1973
4	Geraud Sanders	10	2017 2018 2019
5	Zack Kauth	9	2008 2009 2010 2011
	Bob Farr	9	1972 1973 1974
	Jake Campbell	9	1993 1994 1995
8	Charlie Longnecker	8	1967 1968 1969
	Cormac Carney	8	1978
	Jonathan Warzeka	8	2008 2009 2010 2011

Single season
Rank	Player	TDs	Year
1	Ernie Jennings	17	1970
2	Ernie Jennings	9	1969
3	Cormac Carney	8	1978
4	Frank Murphy	7	1972
5	Garrett Brown	6	2014
	Jalen Robinette	6	2016
	Bruin Fleischmann	6	2025
8	13 players	5	Most recent: Ben Waters/Geraud Sanders, 2019

Single game
Rank	Player	TDs	Years	Opponent
1	Ernie Jennings	5	1969	Utah State
2	Bill Manning	3	1965	Arizona
	Ernie Jennings	3	1970	Idaho
	Ernie Jennings	3	1970	Boston College
	Ernie Jennings	3	1970	Stanford
	Frank Murphy	3	1972	Arizona State
	Steve Hoog	3	1977	Vanderbilt
	Zack Kauth	3	2011	Colorado State
	Tim McVey	3	2015	New Mexico
10	several times	2	Most recent: Bruin Fleischmann, 2025 vs. Colorado State	

== Total offense ==
Total offense is the sum of passing and rushing statistics. It does not include receiving or returns.

=== Total offense yards ===
Career
Rank	Player	Yards	Years
1	Shaun Carney	7,952	2004 2005 2006 2007
2	Beau Morgan	6,627	1994 1995 1996
3	Tim Jefferson	6,587	2008 2009 2010 2011
4	Dee Dowis	6,482	1986 1987 1988 1989
5	Dave Ziebart	5,511	1976 1977 1978 1979
6	Marty Louthan	4,997	1980 1981 1982 1983
7	Rich Haynie	4,740	1971 1972 1973
8	Chance Harridge	4,500	2001 2002 2003
9	Haaziq Daniels	4,179	2020 2021 2022
10	Mike Thiessen	3,820	1998 1999 2000

Single season
Rank	Player	Yards	Year
1	Bob Parker	2,783	1970
2	Beau Morgan	2,704	1996
3	Dee Dowis	2,571	1989
4	Bart Weiss	2,481	1985
5	Keith Boyea	2,469	2001
6	Beau Morgan	2,450	1995
7	Mike Thiessen	2,400	2000
8	Karson Roberts	2,338	2015
9	Chance Harridge	2,291	2002
10	Kale Pearson	2,277	2014

Single game
Rank	Player	Yards	Years	Opponent
1	Liam Szarka	417	2025	Hawai'i
2	Arion Worthman	396	2017	Navy
3	Isaiah Sanders	390	2018	UNLV
4	Bob Parker	380	1970	Colorado State
5	Dee Dowis	377	1988	Northwestern
6	Dave Ziebart	375	1976	Wyoming
7	Donald Hammond III	368	2019	New Mexico
8	Keith Boyea	364	2001	Wyoming
	Liam Szarka	364	2025	Navy
10	Cale Bonds	361	1998	Navy

=== Touchdowns responsible for ===
"Touchdowns responsible for" is the NCAA's official term for combined passing and rushing touchdowns.

Career
Rank	Player	TDs	Years
1	Shaun Carney	70	2004 2005 2006 2007
2	Beau Morgan	67	1994 1995 1996
	Tim Jefferson	67	2008 2009 2010 2011
4	Dee Dowis	59	1986 1987 1988 1989
5	Chance Harridge	51	2001 2002 2003
6	Marty Louthan	43	1980 1981 1982 1983
7	Rich Haynie	42	1971 1972 1973
8	Donald Hammond III	40	2018 2019
9	Haaziq Daniels	39	2020 2021 2022
10	Mike Thiessen	36	1998 1999 2000

Single season
Rank	Player	TDs	Year
1	Chance Harridge	32	2002
2	Beau Morgan	31	1995
3	Beau Morgan	26	1996
	Donald Hammond III	26	2019
5	Dee Dowis	25	1989
	Tim Jefferson	25	2010
	Tim Jefferson	25	2011
8	Keith Boyea	24	2001
9	Bob Parker	23	1970
	Arion Worthman	23	2017

== Defense ==
=== Interceptions ===
Career
Rank	Player	Ints	Years
1	Weston Steelhammer	18	2013 2014 2015 2016
2	Tom Rotello	17	1983 1984 1985 1986
3	Carlton McDonald	16	1989 1990 1991 1992
4	Dwan Wilson	15	1982 1983 1984 1985
5	Anthony Wright	12	2008 2009 2010 2011
6	Kelvin King	11	1993 1994 1995
7	Scott Thomas	10	1982 1983 1984 1985
	Brian Watkins	10	1991 1992 1993 1994
	Jon Davis	10	2008 2009 2010 2011
10	Cyd Maattala	9	1968 1969 1970
	Dave Carraway	9	1979 1980 1981
	Tim Curry	9	1996 1997 1998
	Reggie Rembert	9	2007 2008 2009 2010

Single season
Rank	Player	Ints	Year
1	Tom Rotello	8	1985
	Carlton McDonald	8	1992
3	Jim Smith	7	1970
	Anthony Wright	7	2009
	Weston Steelhammer	7	2016
6	9 players	6	Most recent: Weston Steelhammer, 2014

Single game
Rank	Player	Ints	Years	Opponent
1	Cyd Maattala	3	1968	Colorado State
2	Jim Miller	3	1975	Notre Dame
3	Anthony Wright	3	2009	Houston
4	Weston Steelhammer	3	2014	Boise State
5	Several times	2	Most recent: Jeremy Fejedelem, 2019 vs. Wyoming	

=== Tackles ===
Career
Rank	Player	Tackles	Years
1	Terry Maki	475	1983 1984 1985 1986
2	Tom Foertsch	469	1976 1977 1978
3	Mike France	381	1979 1980 1981
4	Jack Kucera	366	1975 1976 1977
5	Brian Hill	363	1988 1989 1990
6	Chris Gizzi	342	1994 1995 1996 1997
7	Johnny Jackson	340	1978 1979 1980 1981
8	Ryan Williams	338	1977 1978 1979
9	Ray Wild	337	1972 1973 1974
10	Drew Fowler	319	2005 2006 2007

Single season
Rank	Player	Tackles	Year
1	Terry Maki	195	1986
2	Tom Foertsch	184	1977
3	Chris Gizzi	179	1997
4	Jack Kucera	170	1976
5	Jack Kucera	166	1977
6	Tom Foertsch	163	1976
7	Mike France	157	1980
8	Brian Hill	146	1988
9	Willie Mayfield	145	1970
10	Shawn Smith	144	1982

Single game
Rank	Player	Tackles	Years	Opponent
1	Terry Maki	30	1985	Notre Dame
2	Jack Kucera	26	1977	Boston College
3	Tom Foertsch	25	1977	Notre Dame
	Terry Maki	25	1986	Wyoming
5	Jack Kucera	24	1977	Arizona State

=== Sacks ===
Career
Rank	Player	Sacks	Years
1	Chad Hennings	34.0	1986 1987
2	Vergil Simpson	23.0	1990 1991 1992
3	Johnny Harrison	20.0	1992 1993 1994
4	Vince Sanford	16.0	2018 2019 2021 2022
5	Jordan Jackson	15.5	2017 2018 2019 2021
6	Alex Hansen	15.0	2013 2014 2015
7	Ryan Watson	14.5	2013 2014 2015 2016
8	Payton Zdroik	14.0	2022 2023 2024 2025
9	Shawn Thomas	13.5	1997 1998 1999
10	Steve Fernandez	13.0	1994 1995 1996 1997

Single season
Rank	Player	Sacks	Year
1	Chad Hennings	24.0	1987
2	Vergil Simpson	13.0	1991
3	Johnny Harrison	12.0	1994
4	John Steed	11.0	1986
5	Chad Hennings	10.0	1986
	Steve Spewock	10.0	1986
	Randle Gladney	10.0	1989
	Bo Richter	10.0	2023
9	Vince Sanford	9.5	2021
10	Erik Davis	9.0	1984
	Jake Paulson	9.0	2008
	Ryan Watson	9.0	2016

== Kicking ==
=== Field goals made ===
Career
Rank	Player	FGs	Years
1	Dave Lawson	51	1972 1973 1974 1975
2	Ryan Harrison	43	2007 2008
3	Sean Pavlich	42	1980 1981 1982 1983
4	Luke Strebel	41	2015 2016 2017
5	Matthew Dapore	40	2021 2022 2023 2024
6	Joe Wood	39	1989 1990 1991
7	Will Conant	30	2013 2014
8	Joey Ashcroft	29	2001 2002 2003
9	Dennis Leuthauser	27	1967 1968 1969
	Erik Soderberg	27	2009 2010 2011

Single season
Rank	Player	FGs	Year
1	Ryan Harrison	24	2008
2	Erik Soderberg	22	2009
3	Luke Strebel	22	2016
4	Dave Lawson	19	1974
	David Adams	19	2000
	Ryan Harrison	19	2007
	Will Conant	19	2014
8	Joe Wood	17	1991
9	Jim Sturch	16	1978
	Joey Ashcroft	16	2002
	Matthew Dapore	16	2022

Single game
Rank	Player	FGs	Years	Opponent
1	Dennis Leuthauser	4	1969	SMU
	Dave Lawson	4	1974	Navy
	Dave Lawson	4	1975	Army
	Jim Sturch	4	1978	Boston College
	Sean Pavlich	4	1980	Wyoming
	Joe Wood	4	1991	Army
	David Adams	4	2000	Army
	Joey Ashcroft	4	2002	Army
	Erik Soderberg	4	2009	San Diego State
	Tevye Schuettpelz-Rohl	4	2020	Navy

=== Field goal percentage ===
Career
Rank	Player	FG%	Years
1	Will Conant	88.2%	2013 2014
2	Jake Koehnke	88.0%	2018 2019
3	Luke Strebel	85.4%	2015 2016 2017
4	Jackson Whiting	82.6%	1998 1999
5	Joe Wood	79.6%	1989 1990 1991
6	Ryan Harrison	76.8%	2007 2008
7	David Adams	76.5%	1998 1999 2000
8	Carlos Mateos	75.0%	1982 1983 1984
9	Joey Ashcroft	74.4%	2001 2002 2003
10	Matthew Dapore	72.7%	2021 2022 2023 2024

Single season
Rank	Player	FG%	Year
1	Jackson Whiting	100.0%	1999
	Jake Koehnke	100.0%	2019
3	Luke Strebel	90.9%	2015
4	Will Conant	90.5%	2014
5	Joey Ashcroft	88.9%	2002
6	Luke Strebel	88.0%	2016
7	Joe Wood	85.7%	1990
8	Sean Pavlich	83.3%	1982
	Parker Herrington	83.3%	2011
10	Ryan Harrison	82.8%	2008
