= 1999 Colorado State Rams football team =

American college football season

1999 Colorado State Rams football
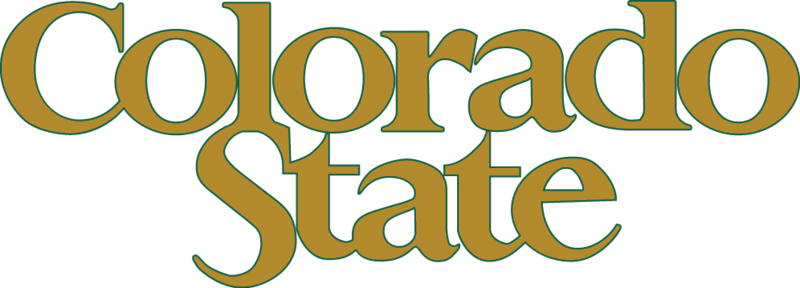

MW co-champion

Liberty Bowl, L 17–23 vs. Southern Miss
- Conference: Mountain West Conference
- Record: 8–4 (5–2 MW)
- Head coach: Sonny Lubick (7th season)
- Offensive coordinator: Steve Fairchild (3rd season)
- Defensive coordinator: Larry Kerr (7th season)
- Home stadium: Hughes Stadium

1999 Mountain West Conference football standings
	Conf.			Overall
Team	W		L	W		L
Utah +	5	–	2	9	–	3
BYU +	5	–	2	8	–	4
Colorado State +	5	–	2	8	–	4
Wyoming	4	–	3	7	–	4
San Diego State	3	–	4	5	–	6
New Mexico	3	–	4	4	–	7
Air Force	2	–	5	6	–	5
UNLV	1	–	6	3	–	8
+ – Conference co-champions; Rankings from AP Poll

The 1999 Colorado State Rams football team represented Colorado State University in the 1999 NCAA Division I-A football season. The team was led by seventh-year head coach Sonny Lubick and played its home games at Hughes Stadium. They finished the regular season with an 8–3 record overall and a 5–2 record in the newly formed Mountain West Conference, making them conference co-champions. The team was selected to play in the Liberty Bowl, in which they lost to Southern Miss.

== Schedule ==
Date	Time	Opponent	Rank	Site	TV	Result	Attendance	Source
September 4		vs. No. 14 Colorado*		Mile High Stadium; Denver, CO (Rocky Mountain Showdown)		W 41–14	73,438	
September 11	2:00 p.m.	Nevada*	No. 24	Hughes Stadium; Fort Collins, CO		W 38–33	25,123	
September 16		at No. 25 BYU	No. 23	Cougar Stadium; Provo, UT		L 13–34	63,054	
October 2		New Mexico State*		Hughes Stadium; Fort Collins, CO		W 46–7	28,856	
October 9	8:00 p.m.	at Fresno State*		Bulldog Stadium; Fresno, CA		L 13–44	37,061	
October 16	1:05 p.m.	San Diego State		Hughes Stadium; Fort Collins, CO		L 10–17	26,774	
October 23	7:00 p.m.	at Wyoming		War Memorial Stadium; Laramie, WY (Bronze Boot)		W 24–13	25,506	
October 28	6:00 p.m.	Utah		Hughes Stadium; Fort Collins, CO		W 31–24	25,120	
November 6		at New Mexico		University Stadium; Albuquerque, NM		W 36–22	26,710	
November 18		Air Force		Hughes Stadium; Fort Collins, CO (rivalry)		W 41–21	32,011	
November 27	2:00 p.m.	at UNLV		Sam Boyd Stadium; Las Vegas, NV		W 35–17	16,498	
December 31		vs. No. 16 Southern Miss*		Liberty Bowl Memorial Stadium; Memphis, TN (Liberty Bowl)	ESPN	L 17–23	56,570	
*Non-conference game; Rankings from AP Poll released prior to the game; All times are in Mountain time

== Rankings ==
Ranking movements Legend: ██ Increase in ranking ██ Decrease in ranking — = Not ranked
	Week																
Poll	Pre	1	2	3	4	5	6	7	8	9	10	11	12	13	14	15	Final
AP	—	—	24	23	—	—	—	—	—	—	—	—	—	—	—	—	—
Coaches Poll	—	—*	—	24	—	—	—	—	—	—	—	—	—	—	—	—	—
BCS	Not released									—	—	—	—	—	—	—	Not released

== Roster ==
1999 Colorado State Rams football team roster
Players
Coaches
Offense

Pos.	#	Name	Class
QB	15	Matt Newton	Jr
RB	32	Cecil Sapp	Fr
RB	36	Kevin McDougal	Sr
G	61	Blaine Saipaia	Sr

Defense

Pos.	#	Name	Class
DB	20	Rhett Nelson	Fr
DB	38	John Howell	Jr
DL	90	Greg Pollard	Sr
DL	91	Bryan Save	Fr

Special teams

Pos.	#	Name	Class

Head coach

- Sonny Lubick

Coordinators/assistant coaches

- Brian Schneider STC/TE

Legend

- (C) Team captain
- (S) Suspended
- (I) Ineligible
- Injured
- Redshirt

Roster
Last update: 2000-08-18
