= 1999 Air Force Falcons football team =

American college football season

1999 Air Force Falcons football
- Conference: Mountain West Conference
- Record: 6–5 (2–5 MW)
- Head coach: Fisher DeBerry (16th season)
- Offensive scheme: Wishbone triple option
- Defensive coordinator: Richard Bell (5th season)
- Base defense: 3–4
- Captain: Game captains
- Home stadium: Falcon Stadium

1999 Mountain West Conference football standings
	Conf.			Overall
Team	W		L	W		L
Utah +	5	–	2	9	–	3
BYU +	5	–	2	8	–	4
Colorado State +	5	–	2	8	–	4
Wyoming	4	–	3	7	–	4
San Diego State	3	–	4	5	–	6
New Mexico	3	–	4	4	–	7
Air Force	2	–	5	6	–	5
UNLV	1	–	6	3	–	8
+ – Conference co-champions; Rankings from AP Poll

The 1999 Air Force Falcons football team represented the United States Air Force Academy as a member of the Mountain West Conference (MW) during the 1999 NCAA Division I-A football season. Led by 16th-year head coach Fisher DeBerry, the Falcons compiled an overall record of 6–5 with a mark of 2–5 in conference play, placing seventh in the MW. The team played home games at Falcon Stadium in Colorado Springs, Colorado

== Schedule ==
Date	Opponent	Rank	Site	TV	Result	Attendance	Source
September 4	Villanova*		Falcon Stadium; Colorado Springs, CO		W 37–13	50,409	
September 18	at Washington*		Husky Stadium; Seattle, WA	FSN	W 31–21	70,019	
September 25	Wyoming	No. 24	Falcon Stadium; Colorado Springs, CO		L 7–10	51,540	
October 2	at San Diego State		Qualcomm Stadium; San Diego, CA	ESPN2	W 23–22	31,856	
October 9	vs. Navy*		FedExField; Landover, MD (Commander-in-Chief's Trophy)		W 19–14	46,450	
October 16	Utah		Falcon Stadium; Colorado Springs, CO	ESPN2	L 15–21	30,616	
October 30	at No. 16 BYU		Cougar Stadium; Provo, UT		L 20–27		
November 6	Army*		Falcon Stadium; Colorado Springs, CO (Commander-in-Chief's Trophy)		W 28–0	53,155	
November 13	UNLV		Falcon Stadium; Colorado Springs, CO		W 35–16	44,187	
November 18	at Colorado State		Hughes Stadium; Fort Collins, CO (rivalry)		L 21–41	32,011	
November 27	at New Mexico		University Stadium; Albuquerque, NM		L 28–33		
*Non-conference game; Rankings from AP Poll released prior to the game

== Rankings ==
Ranking movements Legend: ██ Increase in ranking ██ Decrease in ranking — = Not ranked RV = Received votes
	Week																
Poll	Pre	1	2	3	4	5	6	7	8	9	10	11	12	13	14	15	Final
AP	RV	RV	RV	RV	24	RV	RV	RV	RV	—	—	—	—	—	—	—	—
Coaches	RV	RV	RV	RV	25	RV	RV	25	RV	—	—	—	—	—	—	—	—
BCS	Not released									—	—	—	—	—	—	—	Not released
