= 1986 Air Force Falcons football team =

American college football season

1986 Air Force Falcons football
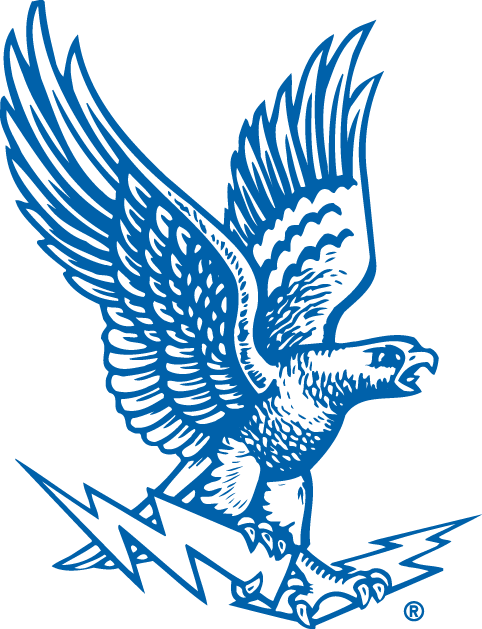
- Conference: Western Athletic Conference
- Record: 6–5 (5–2 WAC)
- Head coach: Fisher DeBerry (3rd season)
- Offensive scheme: Wishbone triple option
- Captain: All seniors
- Home stadium: Falcon Stadium

1986 Western Athletic Conference football standings
	Conf.					Overall
Team	W		L		T	W		L		T
San Diego State $	7	–	1	–	0	8	–	4	–	0
BYU	6	–	2	–	0	8	–	5	–	0
Air Force	5	–	2	–	0	6	–	5	–	0
Hawaii	4	–	4	–	0	7	–	5	–	0
Colorado State	4	–	4	–	0	6	–	5	–	0
Wyoming	4	–	4	–	0	6	–	6	–	0
New Mexico	2	–	5	–	0	4	–	8	–	0
UTEP	2	–	6	–	0	4	–	8	–	0
Utah	1	–	7	–	0	2	–	9	–	0
$ – Conference champion

The 1986 Air Force Falcons football team represented the United States Air Force Academy in the 1986 NCAA Division I-A football season. The team was led by third-year head coach Fisher DeBerry and played its home games at Falcon Stadium. They finished the season with a 6–5 record overall and a 5–2 record in Western Athletic Conference games.

== Schedule ==
Date	Opponent	Site	Result	Attendance	Source
August 30	Hawaii	Falcon Stadium; Colorado Springs, CO (rivalry)	W 24–17	46,242	
September 6	at UTEP	Sun Bowl; El Paso, TX	W 23–21	42,385	
September 20	Wyoming	Falcon Stadium; Colorado Springs, CO	L 17–23	48,749	
September 27	Colorado State	Falcon Stadium; Colorado Springs, CO (rivalry)	W 24–7	41,213	
October 3	at Utah	Robert Rice Stadium; Salt Lake City, UT	W 45–35	33,281	
October 11	Navy*	Falcon Stadium; Colorado Springs, CO	W 40–6	51,004	
October 18	at Notre Dame*	Notre Dame Stadium; South Bend, IN (rivalry)	L 3–31	59,075	
October 25	at San Diego State	Jack Murphy Stadium; San Diego, CA	W 22–10	27,336	
November 8	at Army*	Michie Stadium; West Point, NY	L 11–21	35,217	
November 22	at Rice*	Rice Stadium; Houston, TX	L 17–21	10,000	
December 6	BYU	Falcon Stadium; Colorado Springs, CO	L 3–23	37,004	
*Non-conference game

== Roster ==
1986 Air Force Falcons football team roster
Players
Coaches
Offense

Pos.	#	Name	Class
QB	9	Troy Calhoun	So
QB	6	Dee Dowis	Fr

Defense

Pos.	#	Name	Class
DT	87	Chad Hennings	Jr
LB		Terry Maki	Sr
CB	45	Tom Rotello	Sr

Special teams

Pos.	#	Name	Class
P	39	Mark Simon

Head coach

- Fisher DeBerry

Coordinators/assistant coaches

Legend

- (C) Team captain
- (S) Suspended
- (I) Ineligible
- Injured
- Redshirt
