= 1999 BYU Cougars football team =

American college football season

1999 BYU Cougars football

MW co-champion

Motor City Bowl, L 3–21 vs. Marshall
- Conference: Mountain West Conference
- Record: 8–4 (5–2 MW)
- Head coach: LaVell Edwards (28th season)
- Co-offensive coordinators: Norm Chow (4th season); Roger French (19th season)
- Offensive scheme: Pro spread
- Defensive coordinator: Ken Schmidt (9th season)
- Base defense: 4–3
- Home stadium: Cougar Stadium

1999 Mountain West Conference football standings
	Conf.			Overall
Team	W		L	W		L
Utah +	5	–	2	9	–	3
BYU +	5	–	2	8	–	4
Colorado State +	5	–	2	8	–	4
Wyoming	4	–	3	7	–	4
San Diego State	3	–	4	5	–	6
New Mexico	3	–	4	4	–	7
Air Force	2	–	5	6	–	5
UNLV	1	–	6	3	–	8
+ – Conference co-champions; Rankings from AP Poll

The 1999 BYU Cougars football team represented Brigham Young University in the 1999 NCAA Division I-A football season. The Cougars were led by 28th-year head coach LaVell Edwards, in what would be his second-to-last season with the team, and played their home games at Cougar Stadium. This was the school's first year in the newly formed Mountain West Conference, and they would go on to share the conference's first conference championship with Utah and Colorado State. They finished with a record of 8–4 (5–2 MW), and were invited to the 1999 Motor City Bowl, where they lost to undefeated Marshall, 21–3.

== Schedule ==
Date	Time	Opponent	Rank	Site	TV	Result	Attendance
September 9	6:00 p.m.	Washington*		Cougar Stadium; Provo, UT	ESPN	W 35–28	65,726
September 16	6:00 p.m.	No. 23 Colorado State	No. 25	Cougar Stadium; Provo, UT	ESPN	W 34–13	63,054
September 25	7:00 p.m.	Virginia*	No. 17	Cougar Stadium; Provo, UT	ESPN2	L 40–45	65,453
October 1	7:00 p.m.	at Utah State*		Romney Stadium; Logan, UT (The Old Wagon Wheel; Beehive Boot)	SWP	W 34–31 ^{OT}	31,220
October 9	5:00 p.m.	California*^{†}	No. 24	Cougar Stadium; Provo, UT	ABC	W 38–28	65,617
October 16	6:00 p.m.	at New Mexico	No. 21	University Stadium; Albuquerque, NM		W 31–7	
October 23	5:00 p.m.	at UNLV	No. 19	Sam Boyd Stadium; Whitney, NV	SWP	W 29–0	30,599
October 30	1:00 p.m.	Air Force	No. 16	Cougar Stadium; Provo, UT	ESPN Plus	W 27–20	
November 6	1:00 p.m.	at San Diego State	No. 15	Qualcomm Stadium; San Diego, CA	SWP	W 30–7	40,836
November 13	12:00 p.m.	at Wyoming	No. 15	War Memorial Stadium; Laramie, WY	SWP	L 17–31	26,038
November 20	1:00 p.m.	Utah	No. 19	Cougar Stadium; Provo, UT (Holy War; Beehive Boot)	ESPN Plus	L 17–20	65,942
December 27		vs. No. 11 Marshall*		Pontiac Silverdome; Pontiac, MI (Motor City Bowl)	ESPN	L 3–21	52,449
*Non-conference game; ^{†}Homecoming; Rankings from AP Poll released prior to the game; All times are in Mountain time

SportsWest Productions (SWP) games were shown locally on KSL 5.

== Rankings ==
Ranking movements Legend: ██ Increase in ranking ██ Decrease in ranking — = Not ranked RV = Received votes
	Week																
Poll	Pre	1	2	3	4	5	6	7	8	9	10	11	12	13	14	15	Final
AP	RV	—	—	25	17	RV	24	21	19	16	15	15	19	—	—	—	—
Coaches Poll	—	—*	—	—	19	RV	24	20	19	15	13	12	19	—	25	25	—
BCS	Not released									—	15	14	—	—	—	—	Not released

== Game summaries ==
=== Washington ===
Team	1	2	3	4	Total
Washington	7	0	7	14	28
• BYU	0	13	14	8	35

- Date: September 9
- Location: Cougar Stadium, Provo, UT
- Game start: 6:01 p.m. MDT
- Elapsed time: 3:44
- Game attendance: 65,726
- Game weather: 82 °F (28 °C), Overcast
- TV announcers (ESPN2): Mike Tirico, Lee Corso, Kirk Herbstreit, Dr. Jerry Punch

Scoring summary
1	2:28	WASH	Craig Hawley fumble recovery in end zone (John Anderson kick)	UW 7-0
2	14:07	BYU	Jonathan Pittman 20-yard pass from Kevin Feterik (Owen Pochman kick)	TIED 7-7
2	5:40	BYU	Margin Hooks 5-yard pass from Kevin Feterik (kick blocked)	BYU 13-7
3	10:58	BYU	Luke Staley 9-yard run (Owen Pochman kick)	BYU 20-7
3	7:44	WASH	Todd Elstrom 35-yard pass from Marques Tuiasosopo (John Anderson kick)	BYU 20-14
3	3:42	BYU	Luke Staley 11-yard run (Owen Pochman kick)	BYU 27-14
4	7:58	WASH	Marques Tuiasosopo 5-yard run (John Anderson kick)	BYU 27-21
4	5:04	WASH	Marques Tuiasosopo 3-yard run (John Anderson kick)	WASH 28-27
4	1:16	BYU	Chris Hale 36-yard pass from Kevin Feterik (Doug Jolley pass from Kevin Feterik)	BYU 35-28

=== Colorado State ===
Team	1	2	3	4	Total
#23/24 Colorado State	0	0	0	13	13
• #25/RV BYU	7	14	10	3	34

- Date: September 16
- Location: Cougar Stadium, Provo, UT
- Game start: 6:01 p.m. MDT
- Elapsed time: 3:24
- Game attendance: 63,054
- Game weather: 78 °F (26 °C), Partly Cloudy
- TV announcers (ESPN): Mike Tirico, Lee Corso, Kirk Herbstreit, Dr. Jerry Punch

Scoring summary
1	7:00	BYU	Luke Staley 1-yard run (Owen Pochman kick)	BYU 7-0
2	11:30	BYU	Luke Staley 7-yard pass from Kevin Feterik (Owen Pochman kick)	BYU 14-0
2	1:01	BYU	Jaron Dabney 15-yard pass from Kevin Feterik (Owen Pochman kick)	BYU 21-0
3	2:52	BYU	Owen Pochman 38-yard field goal	BYU 24-0
3	1:40	BYU	Luke Staley 5-yard run (Owen Pochman kick)	BYU 31-0
4	14:55	CSU	Pete Rebstock 30-yard pass from Matt Newton (C.W. Hurst kick)	BYU 31-7
4	6:10	BYU	Owen Pochman 43-yard field goal	BYU 34-7
4	3:19	CSU	Dallas Davis 40-yard pass from Matt Newton (Newton pass failed)	BYU 34-13

=== Virginia ===
Team	1	2	3	4	Total
• Virginia	21	7	17	0	45
#17/19 BYU	0	19	14	7	40

- Date: September 25
- Location: Cougar Stadium, Provo, UT
- Game start: 7:11 p.m. MDT
- Elapsed time: 3:29
- Game attendance: 65,453
- Game weather: 77 °F (25 °C), Clear
- TV announcers (ESPN2): Mark Jones, Sean Salisbury, Nick Lowery

Scoring summary
1	10:27	UVA	Anthony Southern 15-yard pass from Dan Ellis (Todd Braverman kick)	UVA 7-0
1	6:43	UVA	Kevin Coffey 25-yard pass from Dan Ellis (Todd Braverman kick)	UVA 14-0
1	1:11	UVA	Thomas Jones 18-yard run (Todd Braverman kick)	UVA 21-0
2	7:17	BYU	Luke Staley 2-yard run (Owen Pochman kick blocked)	UVA 21-6
2	5:02	UVA	Thomas Jones 45-yard run (Todd Braverman kick)	UVA 28-6
2	3:17	BYU	Luke Staley 41-yard run (Kevin Feterik pass failed)	UVA 28-12
2	1:47	BYU	Brian Gray 28-yard interception return (Owen Pochman kick)	UVA 28-19
3	14:12	UVA	Tim Spruill 20-yard fumble return (Todd Braverman kick)	UVA 35-19
3	13:40	BYU	Margin Hooks 30-yard pass from Kevin Feterik (Owen Pochman kick)	UVA 35-26
3	9:15	UVA	Todd Braverman 46-yard field goal	UVA 38-26
3	7:06	BYU	Ben Horton 8-yard pass from Kevin Fertik (Owen Pochman kick)	UVA 38-33
3	1:51	UVA	Billy Baber 5-yard pass from Dan Ellis (Todd Braverman kick)	UVA 45-33
4	10:54	BYU	Carlos Nuno 19-yard pass from Kevin Feterik (Owen Pochman kick)	UVA 45-40

=== Utah State ===
Team	1	2	3	4	OT	Total
• BYU	7	10	7	7	3	34
Utah State	14	6	0	11	0	31

- Date: October 1
- Location: Romney Stadium, Logan, UT
- Game start: 7:05 p.m. MDT
- Elapsed time: 3:40
- Game attendance: 31,220
- Game weather: 65 °F (18 °C), clear
- TV announcers (SportsWest): Tom Kirkland, Blaine Fowler

Scoring summary
1	12:57	USU	Adrion Peterson 32-yard pass from Jeff Crosbie (Brad Bohn kick)	USU 7-0
1	8:12	USU	Aaron Jones 87-yard pass from Jeff Crosbie (Brad Bohn kick)	USU 14-0
1	4:55	BYU	Jonathan Pittman 26-yard pass from Kevin Feterik (Owen Pochman kick)	USU 14-7
2	11:40	BYU	Doug Jolley 4-yard pass from Kevin Feterik (Owen Pochman kick)	TIED 14-14
2	9:09	USU	Brad Bohn 30-yard field goal	USU 17-14
2	1:26	BYU	Owen Pochman 19-yard field goal	TIED 17-17
2	0:00	UNM	Brad Bohn 55-yard field goal	USU 20-17
3	3:44	BYU	Doug Jolley 5-yard pass from Kevin Feterik (Owen Pochman kick)	BYU 24-20
4	7:23	BYU	Tevita Ofahengaue 14-yard pass from Kevin Feterik (Owen Pochman kick)	BYU 31-20
4	5:42	USU	Brad Bohn 47-yard field goal	BYU 31-23
4	0:21	USU	Demario Brown 4-yard pass from Jeff Crosbie (Aaron Jones pass from Jeff Crosbie)	TIED 31-31
OT		BYU	Owen Pochman 33-yard field goal	BYU 34-31

=== California ===
Team	1	2	3	4	Total
California	0	14	7	7	28
• #24/20 BYU	14	7	3	14	38

- Date: October 9
- Location: Cougar Stadium, Provo, UT
- Game start: 5:07 p.m. MDT
- Elapsed time: 3:42
- Game attendance: 65,617
- Game weather: 83 °F (28 °C), Fair
- TV announcers (ABC): Charlie Jones, Nick Lowery

Scoring summary
1	7:25	BYU	Jonathan Pittman 41-yard pass from Kevin Feterik (Owen Pochman kick)	BYU 7-0
1	1:35	BYU	Tevita Ofahengaue 14-yard pass from Kevin Feterik (Owen Pochman kick)	BYU 14-0
2	8:19	BYU	Margin Hooks 29-yard pass from Kevin Feterik (Owen Pochman kick)	BYU 21-0
2	4:59	CAL	Deltha O'Neal 19-yard interception return (Mark-Christian Jensen kick)	BYU 21-7
2	2:22	CAL	Joe Igber 22-yard run (Mark-Christian Jensen kick)	BYU 21-14
3	5:13	BYU	Owen Pochman 44-yard field goal	BYU 24-14
3	0:18	CAL	Damian Marzett 80-yard interception return (Mark-Christian Jensen kick)	BYU 24-21
4	12:11	BYU	Jonathan Pittman 44-yard pass from Kevin Feterik (Owen Pochman kick)	BYU 31-21
4	1:21	BYU	Luke Staley 7-yard run (Owen Pochman kick)	BYU 38-21
4	0:02	CAL	LaShaun Ward 2-yard pass from Kyle Boller (Mark-Christian Jensen kick)	BYU 38-28

=== New Mexico ===
Team	1	2	3	4	Total
• #21/19 BYU	21	3	7	0	31
New Mexico	0	0	0	7	7

- Date: October 16
- Location: University Stadium, Albuquerque, NM
- Game start: 6:05 p.m. MDT
- Elapsed time: 3:42
- Game attendance: 25,301
- Game weather: 68 °F (20 °C), lightning

Scoring summary
1	10:07	BYU	Fahu Tahi 2-yard run (Owen Pochman kick)	BYU 7-0
1	5:46	BYU	Fahu Tahi 2-yard run (Owen Pochman kick)	BYU 14-0
1	2:33	BYU	Bristol Olomua 4-yard pass from Kevin Feterik (Owen Pochman kick)	BYU 21-0
2	0:41	BYU	Owen Pochman 28-yard field goal	BYU 24-0
3	13:13	BYU	Luke Staley 61-yard run (Owen Pochman kick)	BYU 31-0
4	3:50	UNM	Germany Thompson 5-yard pass from Sean Stein (David McKinney kick)	BYU 31-7

=== UNLV ===
Team	1	2	3	4	Total
• #19/19 BYU	7	9	3	10	29
UNLV	0	0	0	0	0

- Date: October 23
- Location: Sam Boyd Stadium, Las Vegas, NV
- Game start: 7:37 p.m. PDT
- Elapsed time: 3:15
- Game attendance: 30,599
- Game weather: 73 °F (23 °C), clear
- TV announcers (SportsWest): Dave McCann, Blaine Fowler

Scoring summary
1	11:14	BYU	Doug Jolley 12-yard pass from Kevin Feterik (Owen Pochman kick)	BYU 7-0
2	8:13	BYU	Owen Pochman 47-yard field goal	BYU 10-0
2	3:09	BYU	Owen Pochman 26-yard field goal	BYU 13-0
2	0:53	BYU	Owen Pochman 28-yard field goal	BYU 16-0
3	4:55	BYU	Owen Pochman 31-yard field goal	BYU 19-0
4	13:48	BYU	Luke Staley 4-yard run (Owen Pochman kick)	BYU 26-0
4	9:21	BYU	Owen Pochman 30-yard field goal	BYU 29-0

=== Air Force ===
Team	1	2	3	4	Total
Air Force	0	7	3	10	20
• #16/15 BYU	3	14	3	7	27

- Date: October 30
- Location: Cougar Stadium, Provo, UT
- Game start: 1:07 p.m. MDT
- Elapsed time: 3:18
- Game attendance: 65,319
- Game weather: 58 °F (14 °C), Clear
- TV announcers (ESPN+): Chris Marlowe, Mike Hold, Beth Mowins

Scoring summary
1	10:18	BYU	Owen Pochman 36-yard field goal	BYU 3-0
2	11:32	BYU	Luke Staley 14-yard pass from Kevin Feterik (Owen Pochman kick)	BYU 10-0
2	9:26	AFA	Mike Thiessen 37-yard run (Jackson Whiting kick)	BYU 10-7
2	2:37	BYU	Luke Staley 7-yard run (Owen Pochman kick)	BYU 17-7
3	10:05	AFA	Jackson Whiting 25-yard field goal	BYU 17-10
3	1:40	BYU	Owen Pochman 26-yard field goal	BYU 20-10
4	10:18	BYU	Margin Hooks 57-yard pass from Kevin Feterik (Owen Pochman kick)	BYU 27-10
4	3:30	AFA	Scotty McKay 7-yard run (Jackson Whiting kick)	BYU 27-17
4	2:37	AFA	Jackson Whiting 32-yard field goal	BYU 27-20

=== San Diego State ===
Team	1	2	3	4	Total
• #15/15 BYU	0	13	10	7	30
San Diego State	7	0	0	0	7

- Date: November 6
- Location: Qualcomm Stadium, San Diego, CA
- Game start: 6:05 p.m. PST
- Elapsed time: 3:09
- Game attendance: 40,836
- Game weather: 68 °F (20 °C), overcast
- TV announcers (SportsWest): Dave McCann, Blaine Fowler

Scoring summary
1	3:22	SDSU	Jack Hawley 9-yard run (Nate Tandberg kick)	SDSU 7-0
2	8:08	BYU	Luke Staley 20-yard pass from Kevin Feterik (Owen Pochman kick)	TIED 7-7
2	4:58	BYU	Owen Pochman 23-yard field goal	BYU 10-7
2	0:00	BYU	Owen Pochman 27-yard field goal	BYU 13-7
3	13:11	BYU	Hans Olsen 24-yard fumble return (Owen Pochman kick)	BYU 20-7
3	2:43	BYU	Owen Pochman 42-yard field goal	BYU 23-7
4	7:06	BYU	Margin Hooks 15-yard pass from Kevin Feterik (Owen Pochman kick)	BYU 30-7

=== Wyoming ===
Team	1	2	3	4	Total
#15/12 BYU	0	7	3	7	17
• Wyoming	7	7	10	7	31

- Date: November 13
- Location: War Memorial Stadium, Laramie, WY
- Game start: 4:07 p.m. MST
- Elapsed time: 3:20
- Game attendance: 40,836
- Game weather: 62 °F (17 °C), unseasonably warm
- TV announcers (SportsWest): Tom Kirkland, Blaine Fowler

Scoring summary
1	12:18	WYO	Wendell Montgomery 14-yard pass from Jay Stoner (Aaron Elling kick)	WYO 7-0
2	1:53	BYU	Margin Hooks 20-yard pass from Kevin Feterik (Owen Pochman kick)	TIED 7-7
2	0:10	WYO	Wendell Montgomery 20-yard pass from Jay Stoner (Aaron Elling kick)	WYO 14-7
3	10:51	WYO	Aaron Elling 45-yard field goal	WYO 17-7
3	3:59	BYU	Owen Pochman 32-yard field goal	WYO 17-10
3	0:12	WYO	Kofi Shuck 22-yard pass from Jay Stoner (Aaron Elling kick)	WYO 24-10
4	9:12	WYO	Tim Beasley 14-yard run (Aaron Elling kick)	WYO 31-10
4	4:47	BYU	Kevin Feterik 1-yard run (Owen Pochman kick)	WYO 31-17

=== Utah ===
Team	1	2	3	4	Total
• Utah	0	6	7	7	20
#19/19 BYU	3	0	7	7	17

- Date: November 20
- Location: Cougar Stadium, Provo, UT
- Game start: 1:07 p.m. MDT
- Elapsed time: 3:38
- Game attendance: 65,453
- Game weather: 53 °F (12 °C), Cloudy
- TV announcers (ESPN+): Chris Marlowe, Mike Hold, Beth Mowins

Scoring summary
1	7:46	BYU	Owen Pochman 26-yard field goal	BYU 3-0
2	7:55	UTAH	Cletus Truhe 30-yard field goal	TIED 3-3
2	0:43	UTAH	Cletus Truhe 38-yard field goal	UTAH 6-3
3	11:13	BYU	Margin Hooks 77-yard pass from Kevin Feterik (Owen Pochman kick)	BYU 10-6
3	9:29	UTAH	Cliff Russell 70-yard pass from T.D. Croshaw (Cletus Truhe kick)	UTAH 13-10
4	13:08	UTAH	Donny Utu 4=yard pass from T.D. Croshaw (Cletus Truhe pass failed)	UTAH 20-10
4	10:54	BYU	Ben Horton 6-yard pass from Kevin Feterik (Owen Pochman kick)	UTAH 20-17

=== Marshall ===
1999 Motor City Bowl

Team	1	2	3	4	Total
#RV/25 BYU	3	0	0	0	3
• #11/11 Marshall	0	7	7	7	21

- Date: December 27
- Location: Pontiac Silverdome, Pontiac, MI
- Game start: 1:40 p.m. CST
- Elapsed time: 3:03
- Game attendance: 52,449
- Game weather: 65 °F (18 °C), Indoors
- TV announcers (ESPN
  TBC Radio Sports): Dave Barnett, Bill Curry, Dave Ryan (ESPN)
  Will Tieman, Larry Bielat (TBC Radio Sports)

Scoring summary
1	1:58	BYU	Owen Pochman 28-yard field goal	BYU 3-0
2	8:18	MRSH	Doug Chapman 31-yard pass from Chad Pennington (Billy Malashevich kick)	MRSH 7-3
3	0:51	MRSH	Doug Chapman 87-yard run (Billy Malashevich kick)	MRSH 14-3
4	14:07	MRSH	Doug Chapman 1-yard run (Billy Malashevich kick)	MRSH 21-3

== Roster ==
1999 BYU Cougars football team roster
Players
Coaches
Offense

Pos.	#	Name	Class
QB	11	Brandon Doman	So
TE	88	Doug Jolley	So
WR	20	Reno Mahe	So
TE	89	Spencer Nead	Fr
TE	91	Tevita Ofahengaue	Jr
TE	42	Gabriel Reid	Fr
RB	34	Kalani Sitake	Jr
RB	6	Luke Staley	Fr

Defense

Pos.	#	Name	Class
DE	92	Ryan Denney	So
LB	55	Justin Ena	So
DE	93	Byron Frisch	Sr
DT	98	Chris Hoke	Jr
DE	93	Brett Keisel	So
LB	44	Rob Morris	Sr
DT	72	Hans Olsen	Jr

Special teams

Pos.	#	Name	Class
K	27	Owen Pochman	Jr

Head coach

- LaVell Edwards

Coordinators/assistant coaches

Legend

- (C) Team captain
- (S) Suspended
- (I) Ineligible
- Injured
- Redshirt

Roster
