= List of Air Force Falcons in the NFL draft =

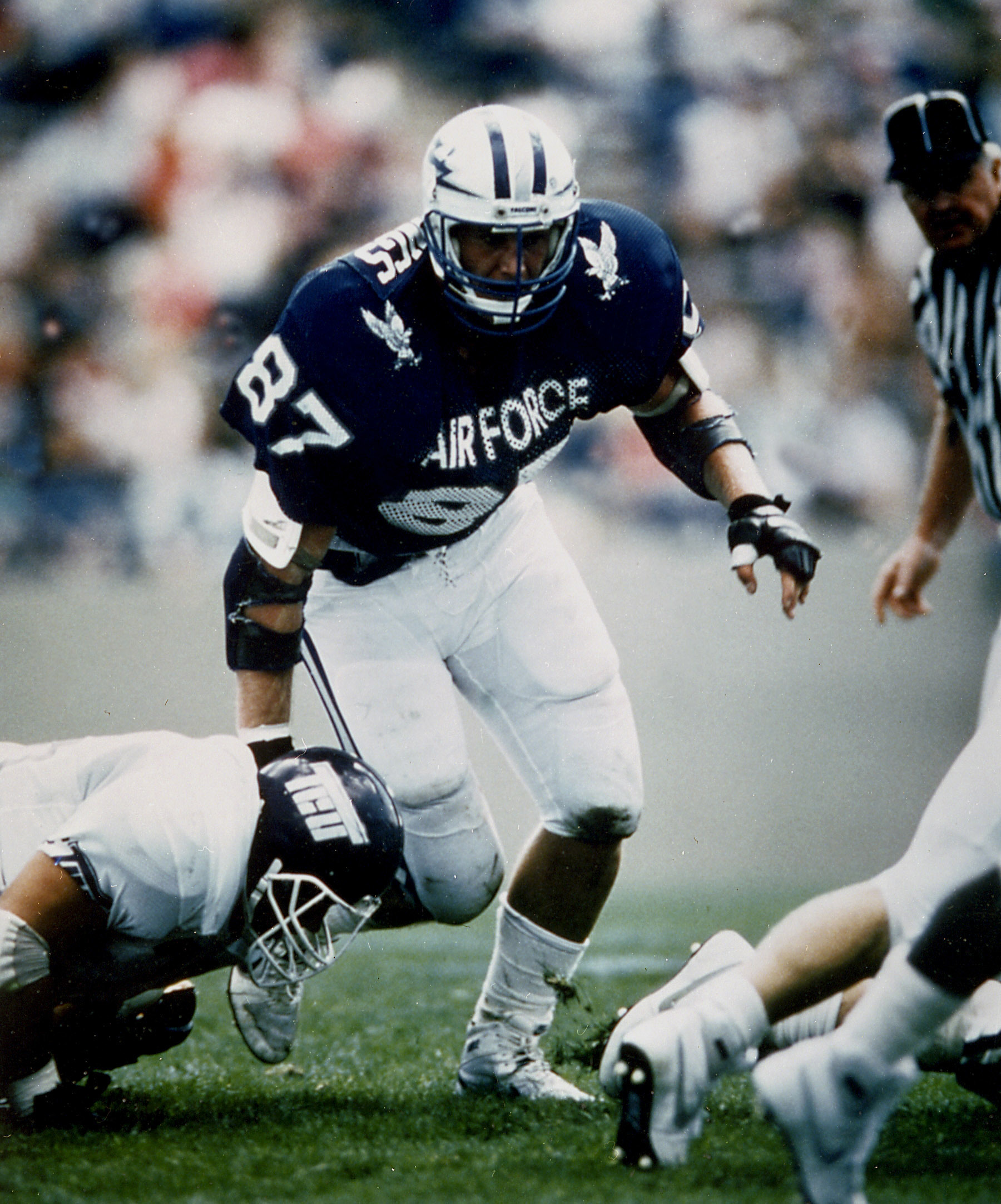
Air Force defensive tackle Chad Hennings was drafted in the 11th round of the 1988 NFL draft by the Dallas Cowboys, with whom he won three Super Bowls.

The following is a list of Air Force Falcons football players who have been selected in the National Football League Draft. As of the 2022 NFL draft, the Falcons have had nine players picked by NFL teams, four of whom have played in a professional game.

Until recently, the United States Air Force Academy required its cadets to serve in the Air Force upon graduating, and historically NFL teams have avoided selecting players from the school outside of the later rounds. For example, kicker Dave Lawson fell as far back as the 16th round in the 1976 NFL draft to the New York Giants; he briefly spent the 1977 preseason with the team via 23-day leave before being released. In 1988, Dallas Cowboys general manager Tex Schramm described selecting service academy players as "just a gamble you take." In the 1992 draft, the Houston Oilers selected Falcon kicker Joe Wood in the 12th round, with head coach Jack Pardee noting it was "no sure thing with Wood" in regards to his service; Wood signed with the Oilers after being assigned to nearby Ellington Field Joint Reserve Base, but a reassignment to Nellis Air Force Base in Nevada ended his hopes of playing for Houston. Graduates from the United States service academies are mandated to serve at least five years on active duty, though they can petition to move to reserve status after two years; Air Force linebacker Steve Russ used such a request to join the Denver Broncos in 1997 after being selected by them in the 1995 NFL draft.

Wide receiver Ernie Jennings was selected by the San Francisco 49ers in the tenth round of the 1971 draft, but had to serve four years before he could join the team; he was cut without playing a game with the 49ers. In 1988, defensive tackle Chad Hennings was seen as a potential first-round pick if it was not for his military obligations, which dropped him to the Cowboys in the 11th round; after serving in the Gulf War, he went on to win three Super Bowls with the Cowboys. Another Falcon who enjoyed NFL success was defensive end Bryce Fisher, who was picked by the Buffalo Bills in the seventh round of the 1999 draft; he fulfilled his obligations at Pope Field before joining the Bills, and later played in Super Bowl XL with the Seattle Seahawks.

The most recent Air Force player to be selected is safety Trey Taylor by the Las Vegas Raiders. He was drafted in the seventh round in 2024.

== Key ==
B	Back	K	Kicker	NT	Nose tackle
C	Center	LB	Linebacker	FB	Fullback
DB	Defensive back	P	Punter	HB	Halfback
DE	Defensive end	QB	Quarterback	WR	Wide receiver
DT	Defensive tackle	RB	Running back	G	Guard
E	End	T	Offensive tackle	TE	Tight end

== Selections ==
Year	Round	Pick	Player	Team	Position
1971	10	257	Ernie Jennings	San Francisco 49ers	WR
1976	16	444	Dave Lawson	New York Giants	K
1988	11	290	Chad Hennings	Dallas Cowboys	DT
1992	24	332	Joe Wood	Houston Oilers	K
1995	7	218	Steve Russ	Denver Broncos	LB
1997	6	178	Daniel Palmer	San Diego Chargers	C
1999	7	248	Bryce Fisher	Buffalo Bills	DE
2019	7	250	Austin Cutting	Minnesota Vikings	LS
2022	6	194	Jordan Jackson	New Orleans Saints	DT
2024	7	223	Trey Taylor	Las Vegas Raiders	DB
