= 1999 Utah Utes football team =

American college football season

1999 Utah Utes football

MW co-champion Las Vegas Bowl champion

Las Vegas Bowl, W 17–16 vs. Fresno State
- Conference: Mountain West Conference
- Record: 9–3 (5–2 MW)
- Head coach: Ron McBride (10th season)
- Offensive coordinator: Tommy Lee (2nd season)
- Offensive scheme: Pro-style
- Defensive coordinator: Kyle Whittingham (5th season)
- Base defense: 4–3
- Home stadium: Rice–Eccles Stadium

1999 Mountain West Conference football standings
	Conf.			Overall
Team	W		L	W		L
Utah +	5	–	2	9	–	3
BYU +	5	–	2	8	–	4
Colorado State +	5	–	2	8	–	4
Wyoming	4	–	3	7	–	4
San Diego State	3	–	4	5	–	6
New Mexico	3	–	4	4	–	7
Air Force	2	–	5	6	–	5
UNLV	1	–	6	3	–	8
+ – Conference co-champions; Rankings from AP Poll

The 1999 Utah Utes football team represented the University of Utah as a member of the newly-formed Mountain West Conference (MW) during the 1998 NCAA Division I-A football season. Led by tenth-year head coach Ron McBride, the Utes compiled an overall record of 9–3 with a mark of 5–2 in conference play, sharing the MW title with BYU and Colorado State. Utah was invited to the Las Vegas Bowl, where the Utes defeated Fresno State. The team played home games at Rice–Eccles Stadium in Salt Lake City.

== Schedule ==
Date	Time	Opponent	Site	TV	Result	Attendance	Source
September 4	2:00 pm	at Washington State*	Martin Stadium; Pullman, WA	KJZZ	W 27–7	26,179	
September 18	6:00 pm	Utah State*^{†}	Rice–Eccles Stadium; Salt Lake City, UT (Battle of the Brothers)	KJZZ	W 38–18	45,224	
September 25	8:00 pm	at UNLV	Sam Boyd Stadium; Whitney, NV		W 52–14	23,352	
October 2	7:00 pm	at Boise State*	Bronco Stadium; Boise, ID	KJZZ	L 20–26	21,817	
October 9	1:00 pm	Louisiana–Monroe*	Rice–Eccles Stadium; Salt Lake City, UT		W 42–0	34,913	
October 16	6:00 pm	at Air Force	Falcon Stadium; Colorado Springs, CO	ESPN2	W 21–15	30,616	
October 23	1:00 pm	San Diego State	Rice–Eccles Stadium; Salt Lake City, UT	ESPN Plus	W 38–16	38,516	
October 28	6:00 pm	at Colorado State	Hughes Stadium; Fort Collins, CO	ESPN	L 24–31	25,120	
November 6	7:00 pm	Wyoming	Rice–Eccles Stadium; Salt Lake City, UT	ESPN2	L 29–43	40,149	
November 13	1:00 pm	New Mexico	Rice–Eccles Stadium; Salt Lake City, UT	KJZZ	W 52–7	37,398	
November 20	1:00 pm	at No. 19 BYU	Cougar Stadium; Provo, UT (Holy War)	ESPN Plus	W 20–17	65,942	
December 18	4:00 pm	vs. Fresno State*	Sam Boyd Stadium; Whitney, NV (Las Vegas Bowl)	ESPN	W 17–16	28,227	
*Non-conference game; ^{†}Homecoming; Rankings from AP Poll released prior to the game; All times are in Mountain time

== Roster ==
1999 Utah Utes football team roster
Players
Coaches
Offense

Pos.	#	Name	Class
RB	37	Mbe Agbor	Jr
RB	22	Mike Anderson	Sr
WR	28	Anthony Arceneaux	Fr
QB	14	Darnell Arceneaux	Jr
QB	5	Brigham Au	Fr
OT	69	Jordan Gross	Fr
WR	1	Cliff Russell	So
WR	7	Steve Smith	Jr

Defense

Pos.	#	Name	Class
CB	5	Jay Hill	Sr
DB	21	Andre Dyson	Jr
DE	63	Garrett Smith	Fr
DT	83	Richard Seals	Sr

Special teams

Pos.	#	Name	Class

Head coach

- Ron McBride

Coordinators/assistant coaches

Legend

- (C) Team captain
- (S) Suspended
- (I) Ineligible
- Injured
- Redshirt

Roster
Last update: 1999-11-06

== NFL draft ==
Three players went in the 2000 NFL draft.

Player	Position	Round	Pick	NFL club
John Frank	Defensive end	6	178	Philadelphia Eagles
Mike Anderson	Running back	6	189	Denver Broncos
Richard Seals	Defensive tackle	7	218	New York Jets
