= 1999 Utah State Aggies football team =

American college football season

1999 Utah State Aggies football
- Conference: Big West Conference
- Record: 4–7 (3–3 Big West)
- Head coach: Dave Arslanian (2nd season)
- Offensive coordinator: Rich Ericson (2nd season)
- Defensive coordinator: Paul Arslanian (2nd season)
- Home stadium: Romney Stadium

1999 Big West Conference football standings
	Conf.			Overall
Team	W		L	W		L
Boise State $	5	–	1	10	–	3
Idaho	4	–	2	7	–	4
New Mexico State	3	–	2	6	–	5
Utah State	3	–	3	4	–	7
Arkansas State	2	–	3	4	–	7
Nevada	2	–	4	3	–	8
North Texas	1	–	5	2	–	9
$ – Conference champion

The 1999 Utah State Aggies football team represented Utah State University in the 1999 NCAA Division I-A football season as a member of the Big West Conference. The Aggies were once again led by head coach Dave Arslanian, who was in his second year with the program. The Aggies played their home games at Romney Stadium in Logan, Utah. Utah State finished with a 4–7 record, a one game improvement over 1998, but would dismiss Coach Arslanian at the end of the season.

The Aggies opened the season against the Georgia Bulldogs, a very strong team. They lost that opener 7–38 but bounced back after an easy win against Stephen F. Austin 51–17. The third game was against their rival, the Utah Utes. They did not beat the Utes, as they wouldn't win until 2012. They had a close win against BYU in the Old Wagon Wheel rivalry but lost 31–34, they would not win until 2010. After two losses in rivalries, they would win against Arkansas State and then fall into a 4 game slump. They got out of that slump against Nevada with a close win, 37–35. They finished off the season winning against North Texas 34–7. They ended the season with a record of 4–7, 3–3 in the Big West.

== Schedule ==
Date	Opponent	Site	Result	Attendance	Source
September 4	at No. 12 Georgia*	Sanford Stadium; Athens, GA	L 7–38	86,117	
September 11	Stephen F. Austin*	Romney Stadium; Logan, UT	W 51–17	17,489	
September 18	at Utah*	Rice–Eccles Stadium; Salt Lake City, UT (Battle of the Brothers, Beehive Boot)	L 18–38	45,224	
October 1	BYU*	Romney Stadium; Logan, UT (rivalry, Beehive Boot)	L 31–34 ^{OT}	31,220	
October 9	Arkansas State	Romney Stadium; Logan, UT	W 20–14	18,147	
October 16	at No. 9 Kansas State*	KSU Stadium; Manhattan, KS	L 0–40	51,106	
October 23	at Idaho	Kibbie Dome; Moscow, ID	L 3–31	23,429	
October 30	Boise State	Romney Stadium; Logan, UT	L 27–33	12,213	
November 6	New Mexico State	Romney Stadium; Logan, UT	L 6–14	8,129	
November 20	at Nevada	Mackay Stadium; Reno, NV	W 37–35	15,171	
November 27	at North Texas	Fouts Field; Denton, TX	W 34–7	7,115	
*Non-conference game; Rankings from AP Poll released prior to the game

== Roster ==
1999 Utah State Aggies football team roster
Players
Coaches
Offense

Pos.	#	Name	Class
WR	84	Jeff Breg	So

Defense

Pos.	#	Name	Class
LB	49	Chris Amidan	Fr
CB	28	Terrance Arnold	So
CB	5	Eddie Badibanga	Sr
LB	19	Tony Newson	Jr

Special teams

Pos.	#	Name	Class

Head coach

- Dave Arslanian

Coordinators/assistant coaches

Legend

- (C) Team captain
- (S) Suspended
- (I) Ineligible
- Injured
- Redshirt

Roster

== Awards and honors ==
The Aggies had 11 players named to either the first or second all-conference team in the Big West.

Player	Position	Team
Demario Brown	RB	1ST
Brent Passey	LB	1ST
Donald Dicko	S	1ST
Ben Holbrook	OL	1ST
Emmett White	KR	1ST
Bucky Orton	TE	2ND
Mike Lindsay	OL	2ND
Vaea Fiefia	DL	2ND
Tony Newson	LB	2ND
Blake Eagal	LG	2ND
Vashon Garmon	CB	2ND
