= 1999 North Texas Mean Green football team =

American college football season

1999 North Texas Mean Green football
- Conference: Big West Conference
- Record: 2–9 (1–5 Big West)
- Head coach: Darrell Dickey (2nd season)
- Offensive scheme: Pro spread
- Base defense: 3–4
- Home stadium: Fouts Field

1999 Big West Conference football standings
	Conf.			Overall
Team	W		L	W		L
Boise State $	5	–	1	10	–	3
Idaho	4	–	2	7	–	4
New Mexico State	3	–	2	6	–	5
Utah State	3	–	3	4	–	7
Arkansas State	2	–	3	4	–	7
Nevada	2	–	4	3	–	8
North Texas	1	–	5	2	–	9
$ – Conference champion

The 1999 North Texas Mean Green football team represented the University of North Texas in the 1999 NCAA Division I-A football season. The Mean Green played their home games at the Fouts Field in Denton, Texas, and competed in the Big West Conference. They were led by second-year head coach Darrell Dickey. The team finished the regular season with a 2–9 overall record and a 1–5 mark in Big West play.

== Schedule ==
Date	Opponent	Site	Result	Attendance	Source
September 2	UNLV*	Fouts Field; Denton, TX	L 3–26	19,011	
September 11	at LSU*	Tiger Stadium; Baton Rouge, LA	L 0–52	79,845	
September 18	at Texas Tech*	Jones Stadium; Lubbock, TX	W 21–14	45,824	
October 2	at Baylor*	Floyd Casey Stadium; Waco, TX	L 10–23	28,743	
October 9	at Idaho	Martin Stadium; Pullman, WA	L 10–28	16,636	
October 16	Boise State	Fouts Field; Denton, TX	W 17–10	11,648	
October 23	Arkansas State^{†}	Fouts Field; Denton, TX	L 10–14	17,236	
October 30	at Nevada	Mackay Stadium; Reno, NV	L 28–41	20,575	
November 13	at TCU*	Amon G. Carter Stadium; Fort Worth, TX	L 3–27	27,133	
November 20	at New Mexico State	Aggie Memorial Stadium; Las Cruces, NM	L 9–22	11,023	
November 27	Utah State	Fouts Field; Denton, TX	L 7–34	7,115	
*Non-conference game; ^{†}Homecoming
