= 1999 Humanitarian Bowl =

Louisville Cardinals	Boise State Broncos
(7–4)	(9–3)
C-USA	Big West
31	34
Head coach: John L. Smith	Head coach: Dirk Koetter
	1	2	3	4	Total
Louisville	17	7	0	7	31
Boise State	14	7	6	7	34
- Date: December 30, 1999
- Season: 1999
- Stadium: Bronco Stadium
- Location: Boise, Idaho
- Attendance: 29,500
- Payout: US$750,000 per team

United States TV coverage
- Announcers: Wayne Larrivee (Play by Play); Randy Wright (Analyst); Mike Gleason (Sideline)
- Nielsen ratings: 1.6

The 1999 edition to the Humanitarian Bowl was the 3rd edition of the bowl game. It featured the Boise State Broncos, and the Louisville Cardinals.

Louisville scored first on a 40-yard Jon Hilbert field goal, as the Cardinals led 3–0. Boise State answered with a 3-yard touchdown run from quarterback Bart Hendricks, to take a 7–3 lead. Louisville's Chris Redman threw a 54-yard touchdown pass to wide receiver Arnold Jackson as Louisville took a 10–7 lead. Bart Hendricks threw a 4-yard touchdown pass to Shae Swan, as Boise State led 14–10. Louisville's Zek Parker returned the ensuing kickoff 91 yards for a touchdown as Louisville led 17–14 at the end of the 1st quarter.

In the second quarter, with Louisville driving, Shanaurd Harts intercepted a Redman pass and returned it 80 yards for a touchdown giving Boise State a 21–17 lead. Chris Redman found Damien Dorsey for an 8-yard touchdown pass making the score 24–21 Louisville at halftime.

In the third quarter, Nick Calaycay kicked field goals of 26 and 46 yards as Boise State led 27–24. In the fourth quarter, Frank Moreau scored on a 3-yard touchdown run giving Louisville a 31–27 lead. Davy Malythong's 5-yard touchdown run made the final score Boise State 34, Louisville 31. The game was sealed when Kareem Williams picked off Chris Redman with under a minute to play.

Throughout the duration of the game, neither team ever led by more than 4 points.

This marked the first ever Division I Bowl win for Boise State.
