= 1999 San Diego State Aztecs football team =

American college football season

1999 San Diego State Aztecs football
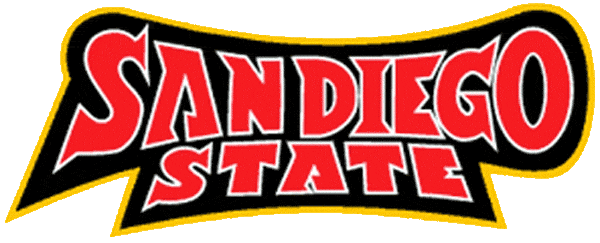
- Conference: Mountain West Conference
- Record: 5–6 (3–4 MW)
- Head coach: Ted Tollner (6th season)
- Offensive coordinator: Dave Lay (7th season)
- Offensive scheme: Pro-style
- Defensive coordinator: Claude Gilbert (9th season)
- Base defense: 4–3
- Home stadium: Qualcomm Stadium

1999 Mountain West Conference football standings
	Conf.			Overall
Team	W		L	W		L
Utah +	5	–	2	9	–	3
BYU +	5	–	2	8	–	4
Colorado State +	5	–	2	8	–	4
Wyoming	4	–	3	7	–	4
San Diego State	3	–	4	5	–	6
New Mexico	3	–	4	4	–	7
Air Force	2	–	5	6	–	5
UNLV	1	–	6	3	–	8
+ – Conference co-champions; Rankings from AP Poll

The 1999 San Diego State Aztecs football team represented San Diego State University as a member of the newly-formed Mountain West Conference (MW) during the 1999 NCAA Division I-A football season. Led by sixth-year head coach Ted Tollner, the Aztecs compiled an overall record of 5–6 with a mark of 3–4 conference play, tying for fifth place in the MW. The team played home games at Qualcomm Stadium in San Diego.

== Schedule ==
Date	Time	Opponent	Site	TV	Result	Attendance	Source
September 4	6:00 pm	No. 23 (I-AA) South Florida*	Qualcomm Stadium; San Diego, CA	ESPNGP	W 41–12	25,576	
September 11	12:30 pm	at Illinois*	Memorial Stadium; Champaign, IL		L 10–38	35,798	
September 18	12:30 pm	at No. 17 USC*	Los Angeles Memorial Coliseum; Los Angeles, CA	ABC	L 21–24	53,966	
September 25	4:00 pm	at Kansas*	Memorial Stadium; Lawrence, KS		W 41–13	34,500	
October 2	6:00 pm	Air Force	Qualcomm Stadium; San Diego, CA	ESPN2	L 22–23	31,856	
October 9	6:00 pm	New Mexico^{†}	Qualcomm Stadium; San Diego, CA		L 21–24	30,508	
October 16	12:00 pm	at Colorado State	Hughes Stadium; Fort Collins, CO	ESPN Plus	W 17–10	26,774	
October 23	12:00 pm	at Utah	Rice–Eccles Stadium; Salt Lake City, UT	ESPN Plus	L 16–38	38,561	
November 6	6:00 pm	No. 13 BYU	Qualcomm Stadium; San Diego, CA	ESPN Plus	L 7–30	40,836	
November 20	1:00 pm	at UNLV	Sam Boyd Stadium; Whitney, NV		W 37–7	18,165	
November 27	4:00 pm	Wyoming	Qualcomm Stadium; San Diego, CA	ESPN	W 39–7	20,622	
*Non-conference game; ^{†}Homecoming; Rankings from AP Poll released prior to the game; All times are in Pacific time
