= 1999 Arkansas State Indians football team =

American college football season

1999 Arkansas State Indians football
- Conference: Big West Conference
- Record: 4–7 (2–3 Big West)
- Head coach: Joe Hollis (3rd season)
- Offensive coordinator: Randy Fichtner (2nd season)
- Defensive coordinator: Leon Burtnett (1st season)
- Home stadium: Indian Stadium

1999 Big West Conference football standings
	Conf.			Overall
Team	W		L	W		L
Boise State $	5	–	1	10	–	3
Idaho	4	–	2	7	–	4
New Mexico State	3	–	2	6	–	5
Utah State	3	–	3	4	–	7
Arkansas State	2	–	3	4	–	7
Nevada	2	–	4	3	–	8
North Texas	1	–	5	2	–	9
$ – Conference champion

The 1999 Arkansas State Indians football team represented Arkansas State University as a member of the Big West Conference the 1999 NCAA Division I-A football season. Led by third-year head coach Joe Hollis, the Indians compiled an overall record of 4–7 with a mark of 2–3 in conference play, placing fifth in the Big West.

== Schedule ==
Date	Opponent	Site	Result	Attendance	Source
September 4	at Illinois*	Memorial Stadium; Champaign, IL	L 3–41	34,227	
September 11	at Ole Miss*	Vaught–Hemingway Stadium; Oxford, MS	L 14–38	44,511	
September 18	at Memphis*	Liberty Bowl Memorial Stadium; Memphis, TN (Paint Bucket Bowl)	L 26–31	21,454	
September 25	TCU*	Indian Stadium; Jonesboro, AR	L 21–24	14,781	
October 2	Sam Houston State*	Indian Stadium; Jonesboro, AR	W 45–20	13,257	
October 9	at Utah State	Romney Stadium; Logan, UT	L 14–20	18,147	
October 16	Idaho^{†}	Indian Stadium; Jonesboro, AR	L 24–30 ^{OT}	12,944	
October 23	at North Texas	Fouts Field; Denton, TX	W 14–10	17,236	
October 30	Louisiana–Lafayette*	Indian Stadium; Jonesboro, AR	W 31–27	10,029	
November 6	at Boise State	Bronco Stadium; Boise, ID	L 10–63	24,022	
November 13	Nevada	Indian Stadium; Jonesboro, AR	W 44–28	9,211	
*Non-conference game; ^{†}Homecoming
