= 1999 New Mexico Lobos football team =

American college football season

1999 New Mexico Lobos football
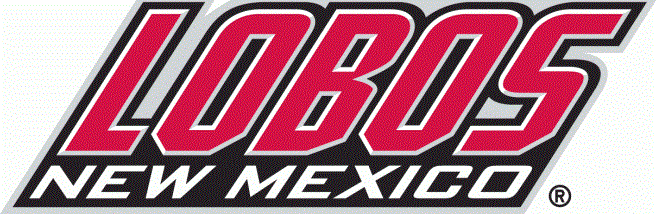
- Conference: Mountain West Conference
- Record: 4–7 (3–4 MW)
- Head coach: Rocky Long (2nd season)
- Offensive coordinator: Jim Fenwick (2nd season)
- Offensive scheme: Multiple
- Defensive coordinator: Bronco Mendenhall (2nd season)
- Base defense: 3–3–5
- Home stadium: University Stadium

1999 Mountain West Conference football standings
| | Conf. | | | Overall |
| Team | W | | L | W | | L |
|---|---|---|---|---|---|---|
| Utah + | 5 | – | 2 | 9 | – | 3 |
| BYU + | 5 | – | 2 | 8 | – | 4 |
| Colorado State + | 5 | – | 2 | 8 | – | 4 |
| Wyoming | 4 | – | 3 | 7 | – | 4 |
| San Diego State | 3 | – | 4 | 5 | – | 6 |
| New Mexico | 3 | – | 4 | 4 | – | 7 |
| Air Force | 2 | – | 5 | 6 | – | 5 |
| UNLV | 1 | – | 6 | 3 | – | 8 |
+ – Conference co-champions; Rankings from AP Poll

The 1999 New Mexico Lobos football team was an American football team that represented the University of New Mexico in the Mountain West Conference (MW) during the 1999 NCAA Division I-A football season. In their second season under head coach Rocky Long, the Lobos compiled a 4–7 record (3–4 against WAC opponents) and were outscored by a total of 298 to 240.

The team's statistical leaders included Sean Stein with 1,584 passing yards, Holmon Wiggins with 601 rushing yards, Martinez Williams with 609 receiving yards, and kicker David McKinney with 42 points scored.

== Schedule ==
| Date | Opponent | Site | Result | Attendance | Source |
|---|---|---|---|---|---|
| September 4 | at UTEP* | Sun Bowl; El Paso, TX | L 10–13 | 41,136 | |
| September 11 | New Mexico State* | University Stadium; Albuquerque, NM (rivalry) | L 28–35 | 33,707 | |
| September 18 | No. 16 (I-AA) Northern Arizona* | University Stadium; Albuquerque, NM | W 45–14 | 22,079 | |
| September 25 | at Boise State* | Bronco Stadium; Boise, ID | L 9–20 | 20,806 | |
| October 9 | at San Diego State | Qualcomm Stadium; San Diego, CA | W 24–21 | 30,508 | |
| October 16 | No. 21 BYU | University Stadium; Albuquerque, NM | L 7–31 | | |
| October 30 | UNLV^{†} | University Stadium; Albuquerque, NM | W 27–6 | 21,854 | |
| November 6 | Colorado State | University Stadium; Albuquerque, NM | L 22–36 | 26,710 | |
| November 13 | at Utah | Rice–Eccles Stadium; Salt Lake City, UT | L 7–52 | 37,398 | |
| November 20 | at Wyoming | War Memorial Stadium; Laramie, WY | L 28–42 | 15,223 | |
| November 27 | Air Force | University Stadium; Albuquerque, NM | W 33–28 | | |
*Non-conference game; ^{†}Homecoming; Rankings from AP Poll released prior to the game

== Roster ==
1999 New Mexico Lobos football team roster
Players
Coaches
Offense

| Pos. | # | Name | Class |
|---|---|---|---|
| WR | 2 | Germany Thompson | Sr |
| TB | 33 | Holmon Wiggins | So |

Defense

| Pos. | # | Name | Class |
|---|---|---|---|
| LB | 44 | Brian Urlacher | Sr |

Special teams

| Pos. | # | Name | Class |

Head coach

- Rocky Long

Coordinators/assistant coaches

- Jim Fenwick
  (Offensive coordinator)
- Danny Gonzales
  (Graduate assistant)

Legend

- (C) Team captain
- (S) Suspended
- (I) Ineligible
- Injured
- Redshirt

Roster
Last update: 1999-11-05
