= 1999 Mountain West Conference football season =

College football conference season

- League: NCAA Division I Football Bowl Subdivision
- Sport: Football
- Teams: 8

2000 NFL draft
- Top draft pick: Brian Urlacher, linebacker, New Mexico
- Picked by: Chicago Bears, 9th overall pick

Regular season
- Champions: Utah; BYU; Colorado State
- Season MVP: Brian Urlacher, safety/linebacker, New Mexico

Football seasons
- 2000

1999 Mountain West Conference football standings
	Conf.			Overall
Team	W		L	W		L
Utah +	5	–	2	9	–	3
BYU +	5	–	2	8	–	4
Colorado State +	5	–	2	8	–	4
Wyoming	4	–	3	7	–	4
San Diego State	3	–	4	5	–	6
New Mexico	3	–	4	4	–	7
Air Force	2	–	5	6	–	5
UNLV	1	–	6	3	–	8
+ – Conference co-champions; Rankings from AP Poll

The 1999 Mountain West Conference football season was the first since eight former members of the Western Athletic Conference banded together to form the MW. Colorado State University, Brigham Young University and the University of Utah tied for the inaugural MW Championship.

== Bowl games ==
Bowl	Date	Stadium	City	Result
Las Vegas Bowl	December 18, 1999	Sam Boyd Stadium	Las Vegas, Nevada	Utah 17, Fresno State 16
Motor City Bowl	December 27, 1999	Pontiac Silverdome	Pontiac, Michigan	Marshall 21, BYU 3
Liberty Bowl	December 31, 1999	Liberty Bowl Memorial Stadium	Memphis, Tennessee	Southern Miss 23, Colorado State 17

=== Mountain West Individual Awards ===
Award	Player	School
Player of the Year	Brian Urlacher, LB/S, Sr.	New Mexico
Offensive Player of the Year	Kevin McDougal, RB, Sr.	Colorado State
Defensive Player of the Year	John Frank, DE, Sr.	Utah
Freshman of the Year	Luke Staley, RB, Fr.	BYU
Coach of the Year	Sonny Lubick	Colorado State

== All-Conference Teams ==
Position	Player	Team
First-team Offense
QB	Kevin Feterik	BYU
RB	Kevin McDougal	Colorado State
RB	Mike Anderson	Utah
WR	Margin Hooks	BYU
WR	Wendell Montgomery	Wyoming
TE	Gray McNeill	San Diego State
OL	James Norman	Air Force
OL	Matt Johnson	BYU
OL	Blaine Saipaia	Colorado State
OL	Mike Malano	San Diego State
OL	Luis Park	Utah
First-team Defense
DL	Byron Frisch	BYU
DL	Clark Haggans	Colorado State
DL	Kabeer Gbaja-Biamila	San Diego State
DL	John Frank	Utah
LB	Rob Morris	BYU
LB	Maugaula Tuitele	Colorado State
LB	Kautai Olevao	Utah
DB	Brian Gray	BYU
DB	Erik Olson	Colorado State
DB	Brian Urlacher	New Mexico
DB	Rico Curtis	San Diego State
First-team Special Teams
K	Jackson Whiting	Air Force
P	Deone Horinek	Colorado State
RS	Steve Smith	Utah

Position	Player	Team
Second-team Offense
QB	Matt Newton	Colorado State
RB	Jonas Lewis	San Diego State
RB	Larry Ned	San Diego State
WR	Dallas Davis	Colorado State
WR	Steve Smith	Utah
TE	Ken Chandler	Air Force
OL	Jimmy Richards	BYU
OL	Jason Carson	New Mexico
OL	Ted Printy	San Diego State
OL	Andrew Kline	San Diego State
OL	Dan Delcorio	Wyoming
Second-team Defense
DL	Shawn Thomas	Air Force
DL	Setema Gali	BYU
DL	Jerome Haywood	San Diego State
DL	Scottie Nicholson	San Diego State
LB	Justin Ena	BYU
LB	Joey Mayo	San Diego State
LB	Patrick Chukwurah	Wyoming
DB	Kevin Thomas	UNLV
DB	Andre Dyson	Utah
DB	Jay Hill	Utah
DB	Matt Lehning	Wyoming
Second-team Special Teams
K	Owen Pochman	BYU
P	Ray Cheetany	UNLV
RS	Dallas Davis	Colorado State
