= 1999 Idaho Vandals football team =

American college football season

1999 Idaho Vandals football
- Conference: Big West Conference
- Record: 7–4 (4–2 Big West)
- Head coach: Chris Tormey (4th season)
- Offensive coordinator: Phil Earley (2nd season)
- Offensive scheme: Spread
- Defensive coordinator: Jeff Mills (2nd season)
- Base defense: 3–4
- Home stadium: Martin Stadium

1999 Big West Conference football standings
| | Conf. | | | Overall |
| Team | W | | L | W | | L |
|---|---|---|---|---|---|---|
| Boise State $ | 5 | – | 1 | 10 | – | 3 |
| Idaho | 4 | – | 2 | 7 | – | 4 |
| New Mexico State | 3 | – | 2 | 6 | – | 5 |
| Utah State | 3 | – | 3 | 4 | – | 7 |
| Arkansas State | 2 | – | 3 | 4 | – | 7 |
| Nevada | 2 | – | 4 | 3 | – | 8 |
| North Texas | 1 | – | 5 | 2 | – | 9 |
$ – Conference champion

The 1999 Idaho Vandals football team represented the University of Idaho in the 1999 NCAA Division I-A football season. The Vandals, led by fifth-year head coach Chris Tormey, were members of the Big West Conference and went 7–4 overall and 4–2 in conference play.

They played their home games at Martin Stadium on the campus of Washington State University in Pullman, Washington, eight miles (13 km) west of their campus in Moscow, Idaho. Martin Stadium was used to satisfy NCAA attendance requirements for Division I-A status. The 16,000-seat Kibbie Dome, an indoor facility on campus in Moscow, was not used for any Vandal football games this season. For the first time in thirty years, the Vandals did not play any games in the state of Idaho.

In the Battle of the Palouse with Washington State, the Vandals won for the first time since 1965, breaking a 14-game losing streak to the Cougars that lasted more than three decades.

Standout defensive lineman Mao Tosi missed the last two games due to a neck stinger; in the finale for the conference title, the Vandals were soundly defeated by rival Boise State in Pullman. This was the beginning of the current losing streak to the Broncos, which reached twelve games in 2010 before the series went on hiatus. Tosi was selected in the fifth round of the 2000 NFL draft and played two seasons with the Arizona Cardinals until a neck injury ended his playing career.

This was the final season for alumnus Tormey as head coach; in December, he left for Nevada, which was moving to the Western Athletic Conference (WAC). A few days later, former Vandal offensive lineman Tom Cable was hired for 2000.

== Schedule ==
| Date | Time | Opponent | Site | Result | Attendance | Source |
|---|---|---|---|---|---|---|
| September 2 | 7:35 pm | at Eastern Washington* | Joe Albi Stadium; Spokane, WA | W 48–21 | 9,694 | |
| September 11 | 4:00 pm | at Auburn* | Jordan–Hare Stadium; Auburn, AL | L 23–30 | 76,465 | |
| September 18 | 1:00 pm | Washington State* | Martin Stadium; Pullman, WA (Battle of the Palouse) | W 28–17 | 34,783 | |
| October 2 | 12:00 pm | at Wyoming* | War Memorial Stadium; Laramie, WY | L 13–28 | 17,079 | |
| October 9 | 6:00 pm | North Texas | Martin Stadium; Pullman, WA | W 28–10 | 16,636 | |
| October 16 | 5:00 pm | at Arkansas State | Indian Stadium; Jonesboro, AR | W 30–24 ^{OT} | 12,944 | |
| October 23 | 1:00 pm | Utah State^{†} | Martin Stadium; Pullman, WA | W 31–3 | 23,429 | |
| October 30 | 5:00 pm | at New Mexico State | Aggie Memorial Stadium; Las Cruces, NM | L 14–42 | 8,810 | |
| November 6 | 12:00 pm | at Nevada | Mackay Stadium; Reno, NV | W 42–33 | 19,232 | |
| November 13 | 11:00 am | at No. 4 (I-AA) Montana* | Washington–Grizzly Stadium; Missoula, MT (Little Brown Stein) | W 33–30 | 19,078 | |
| November 20 | 1:00 pm | Boise State | Martin Stadium; Pullman, WA (rivalry) | L 14–45 | 25,867 | |
*Non-conference game; ^{†}Homecoming; Rankings from AP Poll released prior to the game; All times are in Pacific time

== NFL draft ==
One Vandal senior was selected in the 2000 NFL draft, which was seven rounds (254 selections).

| Player | Position | Round | Overall | Franchise |
| Mao Tosi | DT | 5th | 136 | Arizona Cardinals |
