= 1999 Nevada Wolf Pack football team =

American college football season

1999 Nevada Wolf Pack football
- Conference: Big West Conference
- Record: 3–8 (2–4 Big West)
- Head coach: Jeff Tisdel (4th season)
- Offensive coordinator: Chris Klenakis (3rd season)
- Offensive scheme: Pro-style
- Defensive coordinator: Tom Mason (1st season)
- Base defense: 3–4
- Home stadium: Mackay Stadium

1999 Big West Conference football standings
	Conf.			Overall
Team	W		L	W		L
Boise State $	5	–	1	10	–	3
Idaho	4	–	2	7	–	4
New Mexico State	3	–	2	6	–	5
Utah State	3	–	3	4	–	7
Arkansas State	2	–	3	4	–	7
Nevada	2	–	4	3	–	8
North Texas	1	–	5	2	–	9
$ – Conference champion

The 1999 Nevada Wolf Pack football team represented the University of Nevada, Reno during the 1999 NCAA Division I-A football season. Nevada competed as a member of the Big West Conference (BWC). The Wolf Pack were led by fourth–year head coach Jeff Tisdel, who resigned after the end of the season. They played their home games at Mackay Stadium.

This was the Wolf Pack's last year as a member of the BWC as they joined the Western Athletic Conference for the 2000 season.

== Schedule ==
Date	Time	Opponent	Site	Result	Attendance
September 4	1:00 p.m.	Oregon State*	Mackay Stadium; Reno, NV	L 13–28	29,167
September 11	1:00 p.m.	at No. 24 Colorado State*	Hughes Stadium; Fort Collins, CO	L 33–38	25,123
September 18	2:00 p.m.	at Oregon*	Autzen Stadium; Eugene, OR	L 10–72	41,374
September 25	1:00 p.m.	Fresno State*	Mackay Stadium; Reno, NV	L 24–49	21,115
October 2	1:00 p.m.	UNLV*	Mackay Stadium; Reno, NV (Fremont Cannon)	W 26–12	23,490
October 9		at New Mexico State	Aggie Memorial Stadium; Las Cruces, NM	W 23–16	23,129
October 23	2:00 p.m.	at Boise State	Bronco Stadium; Boise, ID (rivalry)	L 17–52	21,730
October 30		North Texas^{†}	Mackay Stadium; Reno, NV	W 41–28	20,575
November 6	12:00 p.m.	Idaho	Mackay Stadium; Reno, NV	L 33–42	19,232
November 13		at Arkansas State	Indian Stadium; Jonesboro, AR	L 28–44	9,211
November 20		Utah State	Mackay Stadium; Reno, NV	L 35–37	15,171
*Non-conference game; ^{†}Homecoming; Rankings from AP Poll released prior to the game; All times are in Pacific time

== Roster ==
1999 Nevada Wolf Pack football team roster
Players
Coaches
Offense

Pos.	#	Name	Class
QB	10	Erik Stidham	Sr
QB	11	David Neill	So
WR	12	Aaron Carter	Fr
QB	14	Zack Threadgill	Fr
WR	86	Nate Burleson	Fr
WR	87	Trevor Insley	Sr

Defense

Pos.	#	Name	Class
CB	1	Charles Rogers	Sr
CB	2	Del Bates	Jr
SS	12	Josh Wetzel	Fr
LB	13	Jason Burk	Sr
LB	53	Sean Balkman	Jr
LB	54	Bert Schenone	Fr
DE	55	Cedric Pittman	Sr
DE	56	Ronnie Taylor	Jr
DT	57	Mike Donnelly	So
LB	58	Reginald Kinlaw II	Fr

Special teams

Pos.	#	Name	Class

Head coach

- Jeff Tisdel

Coordinators/assistant coaches

- Tom Mason (DC)

Legend

- (C) Team captain
- (S) Suspended
- (I) Ineligible
- Injured
- Redshirt

Roster
