= 1999 UNLV Rebels football team =

American college football season

1999 UNLV Rebels football
- Conference: Mountain West Conference
- Record: 3–8 (1–6 MW)
- Head coach: John Robinson (1st season)
- Defensive coordinator: Jeff McInerney (1st season)
- Home stadium: Sam Boyd Stadium

1999 Mountain West Conference football standings
	Conf.			Overall
Team	W		L	W		L
Utah +	5	–	2	9	–	3
BYU +	5	–	2	8	–	4
Colorado State +	5	–	2	8	–	4
Wyoming	4	–	3	7	–	4
San Diego State	3	–	4	5	–	6
New Mexico	3	–	4	4	–	7
Air Force	2	–	5	6	–	5
UNLV	1	–	6	3	–	8
+ – Conference co-champions; Rankings from AP Poll

The 1999 UNLV Rebels football team represented the University of Nevada, Las Vegas (UNLV) as a member of the newly-formed Mountain West Conference (MW) during the 1999 NCAA Division I-A football season. Led by first-year head coach John Robinson, the Rebels compiled an overall record of 3–8 record with mark of 1–6 in conference play, placing last out of eight teams in the MW. The team played home games at Sam Boyd Stadium in Whitney, Nevada.

== Schedule ==
Date	Time	Opponent	Site	TV	Result	Attendance
September 2	5:00 p.m.	at North Texas*	Fouts Field; Denton, TX	SPW	W 26–3	19,011
September 11	4:00 p.m.	at Baylor*	Floyd Casey Stadium; Waco, TX		W 27–24	32,272
September 18	7:00 p.m.	Iowa State*	Sam Boyd Stadium; Whitney, NV		L 0–24	26,167
September 25	7:00 p.m.	Utah	Sam Boyd Stadium; Whitney, NV		L 14–52	23,532
October 2	1:00 p.m.	at Nevada*	Mackay Stadium; Reno, NV (Fremont Cannon)	SPW	L 12–26	23,490
October 9	12:00 p.m.	at Wyoming	War Memorial Stadium; Laramie, WY	ESPN Plus	W 35–32	19,048
October 23	7:30 p.m.	No. 19 BYU^{†}	Sam Boyd Stadium; Whitney, NV	SPW	L 0–29	30,599
October 30	5:00 p.m.	at New Mexico	University Stadium; Albuquerque, NM		L 6–27	21,854
November 13	11:00 a.m.	at Air Force	Falcon Stadium; Colorado Springs, CO		L 16–35	44,187
November 20	1:00 p.m.	San Diego State	Sam Boyd Stadium; Whitney, NV		L 7–37	18,165
November 27	1:00 p.m.	Colorado State	Sam Boyd Stadium; Whitney, NV		L 17–35	16,498
*Non-conference game; ^{†}Homecoming; Rankings from AP Poll released prior to the game; All times are in Pacific time
