= 1999 Boise State Broncos football team =

American college football season

1999 Boise State Broncos football

Big West champion Humanitarian Bowl champion

Humanitarian Bowl, W 34–31 vs. Louisville
- Conference: Big West Conference
- Record: 10–3 (5–1 Big West)
- Head coach: Dirk Koetter (2nd season)
- Offensive coordinator: Dan Hawkins (2nd season)
- Defensive coordinator: Brent Guy (2nd season)
- Home stadium: Bronco Stadium

1999 Big West Conference football standings
	Conf.			Overall
Team	W		L	W		L
Boise State $	5	–	1	10	–	3
Idaho	4	–	2	7	–	4
New Mexico State	3	–	2	6	–	5
Utah State	3	–	3	4	–	7
Arkansas State	2	–	3	4	–	7
Nevada	2	–	4	3	–	8
North Texas	1	–	5	2	–	9
$ – Conference champion

The 1999 Boise State Broncos football team represented Boise State University as a member of the Big West Conference during the 1999 NCAA Division I-A football season. Led by second-year head coach Dirk Koetter, the Broncos compiled an overall record of 10–3 with a mark of 5–1 in conference play, winning the Big West title. Boise State was invited to the Humanitarian Bowl, where the Broncos defeated Louisville. The team played home games on campus, at Bronco Stadium in Boise, Idaho.

Boise State won all eight games played at the blue turf of Bronco Stadium in 1999.

== Schedule ==
Date	Time	Opponent	Site	TV	Result	Attendance	Source
September 4	7:00 pm	at No. 17 UCLA*	Rose Bowl; Pasadena, CA	KBCI	L 7–38	46,752	
September 11	7:00 pm	Southern Utah*	Bronco Stadium; Boise, ID		W 35–27	25,060	
September 18	10:00 pm	at Hawaii*	Aloha Stadium; Halawa, HI	KBCI	L 19–34	31,751	
September 25	7:00 pm	New Mexico*	Bronco Stadium; Boise, ID		W 20–9	20,806	
October 2	7:00 pm	Utah*	Bronco Stadium; Boise, ID		W 26–20	21,817	
October 9	3:00 pm	Eastern Washington*^{†}	Bronco Stadium; Boise, ID		W 41–7	21,981	
October 16	1:30 pm	at North Texas	Fouts Field; Denton, TX	KBCI	L 10–17	11,648	
October 23	3:00 pm	Nevada	Bronco Stadium; Boise, ID (rivalry)		W 52–17	21,730	
October 30	1:00 pm	at Utah State	Romney Stadium; Logan, UT	KBCI	W 33–27	12,214	
November 6	1:00 pm	Arkansas State	Bronco Stadium; Boise, ID		W 63–10	24,022	
November 13	1:00 pm	New Mexico State	Bronco Stadium; Boise, ID		W 45–26	25,437	
November 20	2:00 pm	at Idaho	Martin Stadium; Pullman, WA (rivalry)	KBCI	W 45–14	25,867	
December 30	1:00 pm	Louisville*	Bronco Stadium; Boise, ID (Humanitarian Bowl)	ESPN	W 34–31	29,283	
*Non-conference game; ^{†}Homecoming; Rankings from AP Poll released prior to the game; All times are in Mountain time
