= 1999 Wyoming Cowboys football team =

American college football season

1999 Wyoming Cowboys football
- Conference: Mountain West Conference
- Record: 7–4 (4–3 MW)
- Head coach: Dana Dimel (3rd season)
- Offensive coordinator: Manny Matsakis (1st season)
- Defensive coordinator: Vic Koenning (3rd season)
- Home stadium: War Memorial Stadium

1999 Mountain West Conference football standings
	Conf.			Overall
Team	W		L	W		L
Utah +	5	–	2	9	–	3
BYU +	5	–	2	8	–	4
Colorado State +	5	–	2	8	–	4
Wyoming	4	–	3	7	–	4
San Diego State	3	–	4	5	–	6
New Mexico	3	–	4	4	–	7
Air Force	2	–	5	6	–	5
UNLV	1	–	6	3	–	8
+ – Conference co-champions; Rankings from AP Poll

The 1999 Wyoming Cowboys football team represented the University of Wyoming as a member of newly-formed Mountain West Conference (MW) during the 1999 NCAA Division I-A football season. Led by Dana Dimel in his third and final season as head coach, the Cowboys compiled an overall record of 7–4 record with mark 4–3 in conference play, placing fourth in the MW. The Cowboys offense scored 302 points, while the defense allowed 270 points. The team played home games at War Memorial Stadium in Laramie, Wyoming.

== Schedule ==
Date	Time	Opponent	Site	TV	Result	Attendance	Source
September 4	5:00 pm	at No. 3 Tennessee*	Neyland Stadium; Knoxville, TN	ESPN2	L 17–42	107,597	
September 11	2:00 pm	Weber State*	War Memorial Stadium; Laramie, WY		W 41–16	16,227	
September 25	1:00 pm	at No. 24 Air Force	Falcon Stadium; Colorado Springs, CO	ESPN Plus	W 10–7	51,540	
October 2	1:00 pm	Idaho*	War Memorial Stadium; Laramie, WY		W 28–13	17,079	
October 9	1:00 pm	UNLV^{†}	War Memorial Stadium; Laramie, WY	ESPN Plus	L 32–35	19,048	
October 16	6:00 pm	at Louisiana–Monroe*	Malone Stadium; Monroe, LA		W 38–20	14,640	
October 23	7:00 pm	Colorado State	War Memorial Stadium; Laramie, WY (rivalry)	ESPN2	L 13–24	25,506	
November 6	7:00 pm	at Utah	Rice–Eccles Stadium; Salt Lake City, UT	ESPN2	W 43–29	40,149	
November 13	4:00 pm	No. 15 BYU	War Memorial Stadium; Laramie, WY	SPW	W 31–17	26,038	
November 20	12:00 pm	New Mexico	War Memorial Stadium; Laramie, WY		W 42–28	15,223	
November 27	5:00 pm	at San Diego State	Qualcomm Stadium; San Diego, CA	ESPN	L 7–39	20,622	
*Non-conference game; ^{†}Homecoming; Rankings from AP Poll released prior to the game; All times are in Mountain time
