= 1999 New Mexico State Aggies football team =

American college football season

1999 New Mexico State Aggies football
- Conference: Big West Conference
- Record: 6–5 (3–2 Big West)
- Head coach: Tony Samuel (3rd season)
- Offensive coordinator: Barney Cotton (3rd season)
- Offensive scheme: Option
- Defensive coordinator: Jeff Jamrog (3rd season)
- Base defense: 4–3
- Home stadium: Aggie Memorial Stadium

1999 Big West Conference football standings
	Conf.			Overall
Team	W		L	W		L
Boise State $	5	–	1	10	–	3
Idaho	4	–	2	7	–	4
New Mexico State	3	–	2	6	–	5
Utah State	3	–	3	4	–	7
Arkansas State	2	–	3	4	–	7
Nevada	2	–	4	3	–	8
North Texas	1	–	5	2	–	9
$ – Conference champion

The 1999 New Mexico State Aggies football team was an American football team that represented New Mexico State University in the Big West Conference during the 1999 NCAA Division I-A football season. In their third year under head coach Tony Samuel, the Aggies compiled a 6–5 record. The team played its home games at Aggie Memorial Stadium in Las Cruces, New Mexico.

== Schedule ==
Date	Opponent	Site	Result	Attendance	Source
September 2	New Mexico Highlands*	Aggie Memorial Stadium; Las Cruces, NM	W 73–7	16,300	
September 11	at New Mexico*	University Stadium; Albuquerque, NM (rivalry)	W 35–28	33,707	
September 18	at No. 22 Arizona State*	Sun Devil Stadium; Tempe, AZ	W 35–7	56,728	
September 25	at UTEP*	Sun Bowl; El Paso, TX (rivalry)	L 23–54	52,247	
October 2	at Colorado State*	Hughes Stadium; Fort Collins, CO	L 7–46	28,856	
October 9	Nevada	Aggie Memorial Stadium; Las Cruces, NM	L 16–23	23,129	
October 23	at Army*	Michie Stadium; West Point, NY	L 18–35	39,381	
October 30	Idaho	Aggie Memorial Stadium; Las Cruces, NM	W 42–14	8,810	
November 6	at Utah State	Romney Stadium; Logan, UT	W 14–6	8,129	
November 13	at Boise State	Bronco Stadium; Boise, ID	L 26–45	25,437	
November 20	North Texas	Aggie Memorial Stadium; Las Cruces, NM	W 22–9	11,023	
*Non-conference game; Rankings from AP Poll released prior to the game
