= John Frank (defensive end) =

American gridiron football player and coach (born 1974)

No. 93, 95
- Position: Defensive end

Personal information
- Born: July 1, 1974 (age 52); Salt Lake City, Utah, U.S.
- Listed height: 6 ft 4 in (1.93 m)
- Listed weight: 285 lb (129 kg)

Career information
- College: Utah
- NFL draft: 2000: 6th round, 178th overall pick

Career history

Playing
- Philadelphia Eagles (2000–2001)*; New York Jets (2002)*; Ottawa Renegades (2002); New York Giants (2003)*; Arizona Rattlers (2005); Georgia Force (2005); Arizona Rattlers (2005)
- * Offseason or practice squad member only

Coaching
- Skyline HS (UT) (2005) (Co-defensive coordinator/defensive line coach); Dixie State (2006–2007) (Defensive line/strength and conditioning coach); Utah (2009) (Graduate assistant)

Awards and highlights
- MW Defensive Player of the Year (1999); First-team All-WAC (1998); First-team All-MW (1999)

John Frank (born July 1, 1974) is a former gridiron football defensive end. After playing college football for Utah, he was drafted by the Philadelphia Eagles in the sixth round of the 2000 NFL draft. He played for the Ottawa Renegades of the Canadian Football League (CFL) in 2002, and for the Arizona Rattlers of the Arena Football League (AFL) in 2005.

== Professional career ==
=== Philadelphia Eagles ===
Frank was drafted by the Philadelphia Eagles in the sixth round (178th overall) of the 2000 NFL draft. In mini-camp, he suffered a knee injury that prevented him from participating through June 2000. He signed a three-year, $900,000 contract with the team on July 11, 2000, that included a $63,000 signing bonus. On July 16, he reported to training camp with the rest of the Eagles' rookies, but did not show up to practice the next day. On July 18, he announced his retirement from football for personal reasons, and returned his signing bonus to the team. He was projected to see significant playing time with the Eagles at defensive end in 2000 before his retirement. He told his mother a couple days later that he was considering a return to football. He spent the rest of the year working at an advertising agency and as a musician.

After the 2000 season, Frank agreed to return to the Eagles and was reinstated to the roster on March 6, 2001. He also received his original signing bonus back for returning. During training camp, Eagles defensive coordinator Jim Johnson was asked about Frank's progress during the offseason, and he said "Just that he's here." Frank was waived during final roster cuts on September 2, 2001, but re-signed to the team's practice squad on September 4. He spent the entire 2001 season on the Eagles' practice squad. During an in-season practice, he was hit in the neck and a magnetic resonance imaging examination found a benign tumor in his throat that required surgery.

=== New York Jets ===
Frank signed with the New York Jets after the 2001 season, but was waived before training camp on May 7, 2002, due to a failed physical exam related to his throat surgery.

=== Ottawa Renegades ===
Frank signed with the Ottawa Renegades of the Canadian Football League in August 2002. He recorded a sack in his first professional game on September 22, 2002. He played in four games during the 2002 season.

=== New York Giants ===
Frank signed with the New York Giants on May 7, 2003. He was waived during the first round of roster cuts on August 25, 2003.

=== Arena Football League ===
Frank was signed by the Arizona Rattlers of the Arena Football League on December 27, 2004. He was waived on March 9, 2005. He was claimed off waivers by the Georgia Force on March 14, and the Rattlers re-acquired him through a trade for Justin Taplin on March 16. He was placed on the injured reserve list by the Rattlers on April 1, 2005. He became a free agent following the season on September 14, 2005.

== Coaching career ==
Frank was the co-defensive coordinator and defensive line coach for Skyline High School in Salt Lake City in 2005. He was hired as the defensive line and strength and conditioning coach for Dixie State College from 2006 to 2007. He was a defensive graduate assistant coach with the Utah Utes football team in 2009.
