= Byron Frisch =

American football player (born 1976)

No. 90, 99
- Position: Defensive end

Personal information
- Born: December 17, 1976 (age 49); Roseville, California, U.S.
- Listed height: 6 ft 5 in (1.96 m)
- Listed weight: 267 lb (121 kg)

Career information
- High school: Bonita Vista (CA)
- College: BYU
- NFL draft: 2000: 3rd round, 93rd overall pick

Career history
- Tennessee Titans (2000); Dallas Cowboys (2001); New York Giants (2002); San Francisco 49ers (2003)*
- * Offseason or practice squad member only

Awards and highlights
- First-team All-Mountain West (1999); 2× Second-team All-WAC (1997, 1998)

Career NFL statistics
- Games played: 23
- Stats at Pro Football Reference

Byron Arthur Frisch (born December 17, 1976) is an American former professional football player who was a defensive end in the National Football League (NFL) for the Dallas Cowboys and the New York Giants. He played college football at Brigham Young University.

== Early life ==
Frisch attended Bonita Vista High School, helping the team win 2 championships. He received league defensive player of the year and All-league honors as a senior. He also practiced wrestling.

== College career ==
He accepted a football scholarship from Brigham Young University. He suffered a fractured ankle as a redshirt freshman, but was able to recover to start 8 games in the season, tallying 40 tackles, 3 sacks, one forced fumble and one fumble recovery.

As a sophomore, he collected 57 tackles, 9 sacks (led the team), 3 forced fumbles and 2 fumble recoveries. As a junior, he registered 70 tackles (fourth on the team), 5 sacks, 14 quarterback hurries, one forced fumble and one fumble recovery.

As a senior, he registered 55 tackles (17 for loss), 8 sacks, 14 quarterback hurries and 2 forced fumbles. He finished his career with 222 tackles (43 for loss), 25 sacks, 46 quarterback hurries, 7 forced fumbles and 4 fumble recoveries.

== Professional career ==
=== Tennessee Titans ===
Frisch was selected by the Tennessee Titans in the third round (93rd overall) of the 2000 NFL draft. As a rookie, he was declared inactive in all 16 games and also suffered from a foot injury. He was waived on September 2, 2001.

=== Dallas Cowboys ===
On September 24, 2001, he was signed as a free agent by the Dallas Cowboys. He was used mostly as a pass rush specialist, because he struggled defending the run, finishing with 8 tackles (one for loss), 3 sacks, one pass defensed, one quarterback pressure and one forced fumble. He was released on August 27, 2002.

=== New York Giants ===
The New York Giants signed him as a free agent on October 15, 2002, after Keith Hamilton was injured. He was cut on March 23, 2003.

=== San Francisco 49ers ===
On July 3, 2003, he was signed as a free agent by the San Francisco 49ers. He was released on August 26.

== Personal life ==
In 2013, he was charged with conspiracy to commit mail fraud in California. He has 3 children and a wife. His oldest son is Colton, middle daughter is Chloe, and the youngest child names soren. Byron now lives running a solar company in San Marcos. The charges were dismissed in 2016.
