= Fisher DeBerry =

American football player and coach (born 1938)

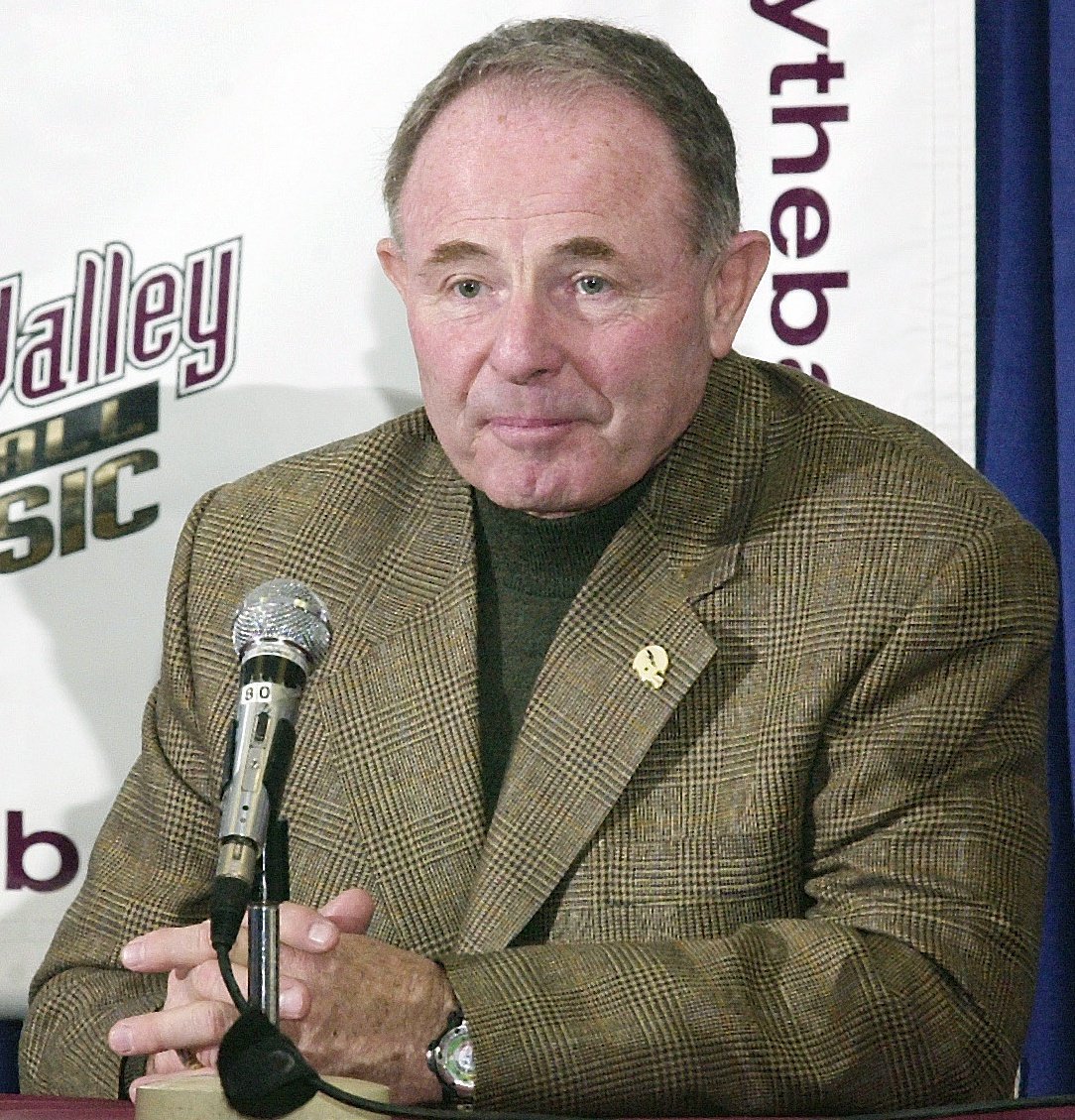
- DeBerry speaks at a press conference before the 2000 Silicon Valley Football Classic.

Biographical details
- Born: June 8, 1938 (age 88); Cheraw, South Carolina, U.S.

Playing career

Football
- 1956–1960: Wofford
- Positions: Flanker, defensive back, linebacker

Coaching career (HC unless noted)

Football
- 1962: Bennettsville HS (SC) (asst.)
- 1963–1968: McClenaghan HS (SC) (asst.)
- 1969–1970: Wofford (assistant)
- 1971–1979: Appalachian State (assistant)
- 1980: Air Force (QB)
- 1981–1983: Air Force (OC/QB)
- 1984–2006: Air Force

Baseball
- 1963–1968: McClenaghan HS (SC)
- 1970: Wofford

Head coaching record
- Overall: 6–15 (college baseball); 169–109–1 (college football)
- Bowls: 6–6

Accomplishments and honors

Championships
- Football; 3 WAC (1985, 1995, 1998); 1 WAC Mountain Division (1998)

Awards
- Football; AFCA Coach of the Year Award (1985); Bobby Dodd Coach of the Year Award (1985); Walter Camp Coach of the Year Award (1985); 3× WAC Coach of the Year (1985, 1995, 1998)
- College Football Hall of Fame; Inducted in 2011 (profile)

James Fisher DeBerry (born June 8, 1938) is a retired American football player. He served as the head football coach at the United States Air Force Academy from 1984 to 2006, compiling a record of 169–109–1. DeBerry led 17 of his 23 Air Force Falcons squads to winning records and captured 12 bowl game bids. Three times his teams won the Western Athletic Conference title: once in 1985, then in 1995, and again in 1998. DeBerry retired on December 15, 2006, with the most wins and highest winning percentage (.608) in the history of Air Force football. He was inducted into the College Football Hall of Fame as a coach in 2011.

== Background ==
DeBerry was born in Cheraw, South Carolina in 1938. In high school, DeBerry was a four-sport varsity letter winner, lettering five times in baseball, three times each in football and basketball and twice in track. He was also an all-state selection in baseball and football. DeBerry graduated in 1960 from Wofford College in Spartanburg, South Carolina, where he lettered in football and baseball. He was also active in the Kappa Sigma fraternity while in college.

After six years of coaching and teaching in the South Carolina high school ranks, DeBerry returned to Wofford, where he coached for two years as an assistant when Wofford won 21 consecutive games and was ranked first in the NAIA. For the next nine years, 1971 to 1979, DeBerry was an assistant coach at Appalachian State University. While DeBerry was there, Appalachian State was ranked in the top 10 nationally in either rushing, total offense or scoring offense three times. In 1974, the team ranked sixth nationally in pass defense when he was defensive coordinator.

== Air Force football ==
Air Force head coach Ken Hatfield hired DeBerry in 1980 as the quarterbacks coach. The next year, DeBerry was promoted to offensive coordinator. In 1982, Air Force posted an 8–5 record while averaging 30.4 points per game, and beat Vanderbilt in the 1982 Hall of Fame Classic. After the 1983 season, Hatfield left Air Force for Arkansas after the Falcons' 10–2 season and Independence Bowl victory. DeBerry was promoted to head coach.

During DeBerry's tenure as head coach, Air Force won at least eight games 11 different seasons. DeBerry's first team, in 1984, was 8–4 and beat Virginia Tech in the 1984 Independence Bowl. The next year, the Falcons won 12 games, and were ranked as high as No. 4 nationally until a 28–21 loss at BYU. In the final Associated Press poll, the Falcons ranked eighth. DeBerry coached the Falcons to three Western Athletic Conference championships: 1985, 1995, and 1998. The 1998 team went 12–1 for the first back-to-back 10-win seasons in school history and finished the season ranked 10th nationally.

DeBerry's Falcons dominated the Commander-in-Chief's Trophy series contested yearly with arch rival military academies Army and Navy. Air Force won the trophy 14 times and shared it once in DeBerry's 21 seasons. However, DeBerry lost the AF-Navy game and, subsequently, the CIC trophy each of his last four years at Air Force. He was a combined 34–8 against the Black Knights and Midshipmen and is the most successful coach in service academy history. DeBerry led the academy to 12 bowl games, in which he had a 6–6 record.

Although DeBerry had been portrayed as a role model for most of his career, he came under fire for controversial racial remarks he made in October 2005 after a 48–10 loss to Texas Christian University (TCU). DeBerry said TCU "had a lot more Afro-American players than we did and they ran a lot faster than we did. Afro-American kids can run very well. That doesn't mean that Caucasian kids and other descents can't run, but it's very obvious to me that they run extremely well." Earlier that year, DeBerry had been criticized for a banner posted in the team's locker room that was interpreted by some as inappropriate religious proselytizing.

On December 15, 2006, DeBerry announced his retirement.

== Other positions and awards ==
DeBerry was named WAC "Coach of the Year" three times in his career, and in 1985, won the Paul "Bear" Bryant Award as NCAA college football's coach of the year. DeBerry was also awarded the State Farm Coach of Distinction award in 2001, and was inducted into the South Carolina Sports Hall of Fame. DeBerry received an honorary doctorate of humanities from Wofford during its graduation ceremony in 2003.

In 1996, DeBerry served as president of the American Football Coaches Association, and is currently the chairman of the AFCA ethics committee. He was honored by the Independence Bowl as a member of its Hall of Fame. In 2005, DeBerry was honored with induction into the Colorado Springs Sports Hall of Fame.

== Personal life ==
DeBerry and his wife, LuAnn, are notably active in church, charity and community affairs. Coach DeBerry gives motivational speeches to religious and corporate groups, and LuAnn is a volunteer with the Ronald McDonald House and the American Cancer Society. DeBerry has strong ties to the Fellowship of Christian Athletes and was inducted into the organization's Hall of Champions in 2005. He and LuAnn have assisted fund-raising efforts for Easter Seals, the March of Dimes, the Salvation Army and the American Heart Association. DeBerry's son, Joe, played in the Cincinnati Reds, New York Yankees and Milwaukee Brewers baseball organizations. DeBerry currently resides in Grove, Oklahoma.

== Head coaching record ==
=== College football ===
Year	Team	Overall	Conference	Standing	Bowl/playoffs	Coaches^{#}	AP^{°}
Air Force Falcons (Western Athletic Conference) (1984–1998)
1984	Air Force	8–4	4–3	3rd	W Independence		
1985	Air Force	12–1	7–1	T–1st	W Bluebonnet	5	8
1986	Air Force	6–5	5–2	3rd			
1987	Air Force	9–4	6–2	3rd	L Freedom		
1988	Air Force	5–7	3–5	T–6th			
1989	Air Force	8–4–1	5–1–1	2nd	L Liberty		
1990	Air Force	7–5	3–4	6th	W Liberty		
1991	Air Force	10–3	6–2	3rd	W Liberty	24	25
1992	Air Force	7–5	4–4	T–5th	L Liberty		
1993	Air Force	4–8	1–7	9th			
1994	Air Force	8–4	6–2	T–2nd			
1995	Air Force	8–5	6–2	T–1st	L Copper		
1996	Air Force	6–5	5–3	4th (Pacific)			
1997	Air Force	10–3	6–2	2nd (Pacific)	L Las Vegas	25	
1998	Air Force	12–1	7–1	1st (Mountain)	W Oahu	10	13
Air Force Falcons (Mountain West Conference) (1999–2006)
1999	Air Force	6–5	2–5	7th			
2000	Air Force	9–3	5–2	2nd	W Silicon Valley		
2001	Air Force	6–6	3–4	T–5th			
2002	Air Force	8–5	4–3	T–3rd	L San Francisco		
2003	Air Force	7–5	3–4	T–4th			
2004	Air Force	5–6	3–4	T–4th			
2005	Air Force	4–7	3–5	7th			
2006	Air Force	4–8	3–5	T–6th			
Air Force:		169–109–1	100–75–1				
Total:		169–109–1					
National championship Conference title Conference division title or championship game berth
^{#}Rankings from final Coaches Poll.; ^{°}Rankings from final AP Poll.

=== College baseball ===
Record table
Season	Team	Overall	Conference	Standing	Postseason
Wofford Terriers (NCAA College Division independent) (1970)
1970	Wofford	6–15			
Wofford:		6–15 (.286)			
Total:		6–15 (.286)			

== See also ==
- Legends Poll
