= Blaine Saipaia =

American football player (born 1978)

No. 60, 67
- Position: Center / Guard

Personal information
- Born: August 25, 1978 (age 48); San Diego, California, U.S.
- Listed height: 6 ft 3 in (1.91 m)
- Listed weight: 340 lb (154 kg)

Career information
- High school: Channel Islands (Oxnard, California)
- College: Colorado State
- NFL draft: 2000: undrafted

Career history
- New Orleans Saints (2000–2001)*; Tennessee Titans (2002)*; Oakland Raiders (2003)*; Denver Broncos (2003)*; Oakland Raiders (2003); St. Louis Rams (2004–2005); Detroit Lions (2006–2007)
- * Offseason or practice squad member only

Awards and highlights
- First-team All-Mountain West (1999)

Career NFL statistics
- Games played: 37
- Games started: 13
- Fumble recoveries: 1
- Stats at Pro Football Reference

Blaine Saipaia /ˌsaɪpəˈiə/ (born August 25, 1978) is an American former professional football player who was an offensive lineman in the National Football League (NFL). He played college football for the Colorado State Rams and was signed by the New Orleans Saints as an undrafted free agent in 2000.

Saipaia graduated from Channel Islands High School in Oxnard, California. After retiring from the NFL, he became an assistant coach at Poudre High School in Fort Collins, Colorado. In 2017, he joined Canton McKinley High School in Canton, Ohio, as freshman football coach. He later became a school resource assistant and by 2019 varsity head coach.
