= Kevin McDougal (running back) =

American football player (born 1977)

No. 43
- Position: Running back

Personal information
- Born: May 18, 1977 (age 49); Denver, Colorado, U.S.
- Listed height: 5 ft 11 in (1.80 m)
- Listed weight: 203 lb (92 kg)

Career information
- High school: Arvada West (Arvada, Colorado)
- College: Colorado State (1996–1999)
- NFL draft: 2000: undrafted

Career history
- Indianapolis Colts (2000–2002)

Awards and highlights
- MW Offensive Player of the Year (1999); First-team All-MW (1999)

Career NFL statistics
- Rushing yards: 48
- Rushing average: 2.8
- Stats at Pro Football Reference

Kevin John McDougal (born May 18, 1977) is an American former professional football player who was a running back for two seasons with the Indianapolis Colts of the National Football League (NFL). He played college football for the Colorado State Rams.

== Early life ==
Kevin John McDougal was born on May 18, 1977, in Denver, Colorado. He attended Arvada West High School in Arvada, Colorado.

== College career ==
McDougal played for the Colorado State Rams from 1996 to 1999. In 1999, he was named the Mountain West offensive player of the year and scholar-athlete of the year by the National Football Foundation and Hall of Fame. He also played in the Hula Bowl and was named to three all-conference teams. He was inducted into the Colorado State University Sports Hall of Fame in 2012.

== Professional career ==
Pre-draft measurables
Height	Weight	40-yard dash	10-yard split	20-yard split	20-yard shuttle	Three-cone drill	Vertical jump	Broad jump
5 ft 11 in (1.80 m)	206 lb (93 kg)	4.62 s	1.59 s	2.66 s	4.12 s	7.08 s	32 in (0.81 m)	9 ft 0 in (2.74 m)
All values from NFL Combine

After going undrafted in the 2000 NFL draft, McDougal signed with the Indianapolis Colts on April 28. He played in six games for the Colts during the 2000 season, posting two solo tackles and one assisted tackle, before being placed on injured reserve on November 28, 2000. He was released on September 1, 2001, and signed to the team's practice squad two days later. McDougal was promoted to the active roster on September 30 and played in the Week 3 game against the New England Patriots before being released on October 1. He was later re-signed by the Colts on November 3 and appeared in eight more games that year, totaling 17 carries for 48 yards, one reception for ten yards, 16 kick returns for 362 yards, one two-point conversion, two solo tackles, and one assisted tackle. He was placed on the waived-injured list by the Colts on September 1, 2002.
