= Ernie Jennings =

American football player (born 1949)

No. 22
- Position: Wide receiver

Personal information
- Born: January 30, 1949 (age 77); Atchison, Kansas, U.S.

Career information
- High school: Kansas City Central (Kansas City, Missouri)
- College: Air Force
- NFL draft: 1971: 10th round, 257th overall pick

Career history
- San Francisco 49ers (1975)*
- * Offseason or practice squad member only

Awards and highlights
- Consensus All-American (1970)

Ernie Jennings (born January 30, 1949) is an American former college football player who was a wide receiver for the Air Force Falcons. He was named a consensus All-American in 1970.

== Early life ==
Ernie Jennings was born on January 30, 1949, in Atchison, Kansas. He attended Kansas City Central High School in Kansas City, Missouri.

== College career ==
Jennings played college football for the Air Force Falcons of the United States Air Force Academy. He originally joined the team as a defensive back but switched to receiver. He was a consensus All-American in 1970 and finished eighth in Heisman Trophy voting after catching 74 passes for 1,289 yards. He also led NCAA Division I football in receiving touchdowns in 1970 with 17. He is Air Force's all-time leader in receptions with 148, 2nd in receiving yards with 2,392 and leads the team in receiving touchdowns with 28. Jennings was on the 2014 ballot for induction into the College Football Hall of Fame but was not chosen.

== Professional career ==
Jennings was selected 257th overall by the San Francisco 49ers in the tenth round of the 1971 NFL draft. He spent time in the military after college and was released by the San Francisco 49ers in August 1975.

== Personal life ==
Jennings then began a career at NASA in 1976.
