= Triple option =

American football strategic play

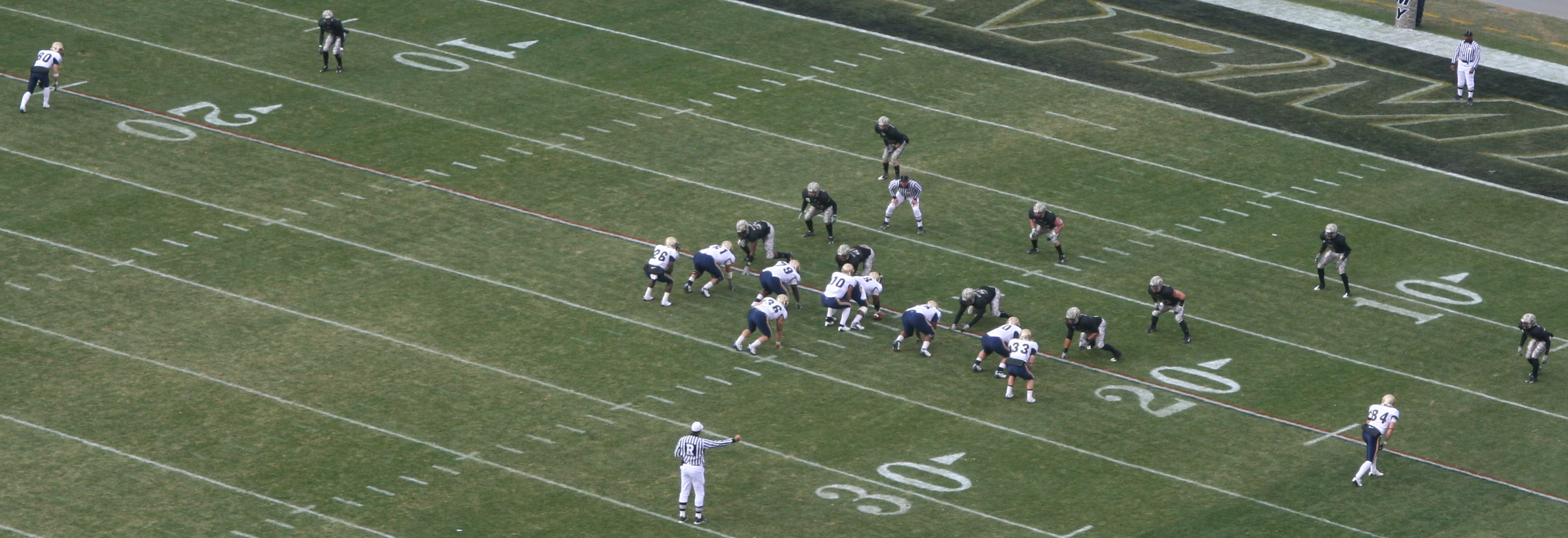
The Paul Johnson-concocted version of the triple option using a quarterback, two slotbacks, a fullback, and two wide receivers, known as the flexbone formation. Here, Navy is running the offense against Army in the 2008 Army–Navy Game.

The triple option is an American football play used to offer six ways to move the football forward on the field of play. The triple option is based on the option run, but uses three players who might run with the ball instead of the two used in a standard option run.

The triple option forces defenses to worry about multiple running options on a single play. For the offense, the decision of who is to carry the ball—which option to use—is made during the play by the quarterback (QB). The QB makes the decision whether to give the ball to the fullback (FB) or, based on his read of the defense, to keep the ball. If the QB does choose to keep the ball after the initial snap, he still retains the third option of handing the ball off to the tailback. If, for example, the defensive end (DE) is blocking the FB or for any other reason it appears to him that his group of ball-carriers are otherwise limited, he will simply keep the ball himself instead of handing it off. If the DE runs straight upfield or directly at the QB, then the QB gives the ball to the FB. The triple option can be complemented by fixed running plays which look like the triple option when they start, but use traditional blocking, as well as play-action passing.

There are three basic forms of triple option: the wishbone triple option, the veer triple option, and the I formation triple option. These differ in terms of the personnel on the field and their positioning prior to the start of the play.

== Wishbone ==
The wishbone formation.

The wishbone triple option can use several formations including the flexbone or Maryland I. The wishbone triple option is a running play where either the fullback, the quarterback, or one of the halfbacks (also called "running backs" [RB] or "tail backs") runs the ball.

First, the quarterback receives the football from the center. The quarterback then starts the play in one direction by appearing to hand the football to the fullback right behind the play side guard on a standard fullback dive play. The guard "chips" the 3-technique (defensive tackle) and blocks the play side (the side where the play is going) inside linebacker (usually called the "mike", or middle linebacker). The quarterback then reads the unblocked defensive lineman. If the lineman attacks the fullback, the quarterback pulls the ball from the fullback's gut and continues down the line, but if the defensive lineman goes outside to contain the play, he hands off inside to the fullback. The offensive tackle on the side of the play's direction does not block the defensive end and instead moves to block the first threat, usually the linebacker stacked behind the defensive end. In the traditional triple option the backside tailback will take a parallel course down the line of scrimmage keeping a three to five yard separation from the quarterback. If the defensive end comes inside toward the quarterback, he will pitch it outside to the trailing halfback. If the defensive end retains outside leverage and covers the trailing halfback closely, the quarterback will keep the ball and run upfield inside of the defensive end. The tailback to the play side is responsible for blocking one of the defensive backs, usually one of the deep safeties. The wide receiver (WR) to the play side is responsible for blocking the corner back assigned to cover them if the defense were playing man coverage.

If this is run properly it can be extremely effective as most all defensive players are accounted for by blockers. Once the quarterback or tailback gets beyond the line of scrimmage there should be nobody in front of him because the tackle, guard, tailback, and wide receiver are all downfield picking up the first threat.

The play is called the triple option as the fullback dive is the first option, the quarterback keeping the ball is the second option, and the quarterback pitching to the halfback is the third option.

== Flexbone ==
The flexbone triple option, is a more recent, condensed variant of the wishbone option. The formation consists of two wide receivers, two slotbacks, or halfbacks that lineup just behind and outside of the tackles, the quarterback, the full back, and the offensive line. In the flexbone triple option, most commonly a veer, a slotback is sent in motion of the direction of the play, then the quarterback is responsible for reading the "read" key to see if they attack the fullback or stay back for the quarterback. If the "read" key attacks the fullback, then the quarterback needs to read the "pitch" key to keep it or pitch it. If the "pitch" key stays back the quarterback is supposed to keep the ball, but if he crashes the quarterback pitches it.

This is the main option ran by the service academies (Army, Navy, Air Force, The Citadel).

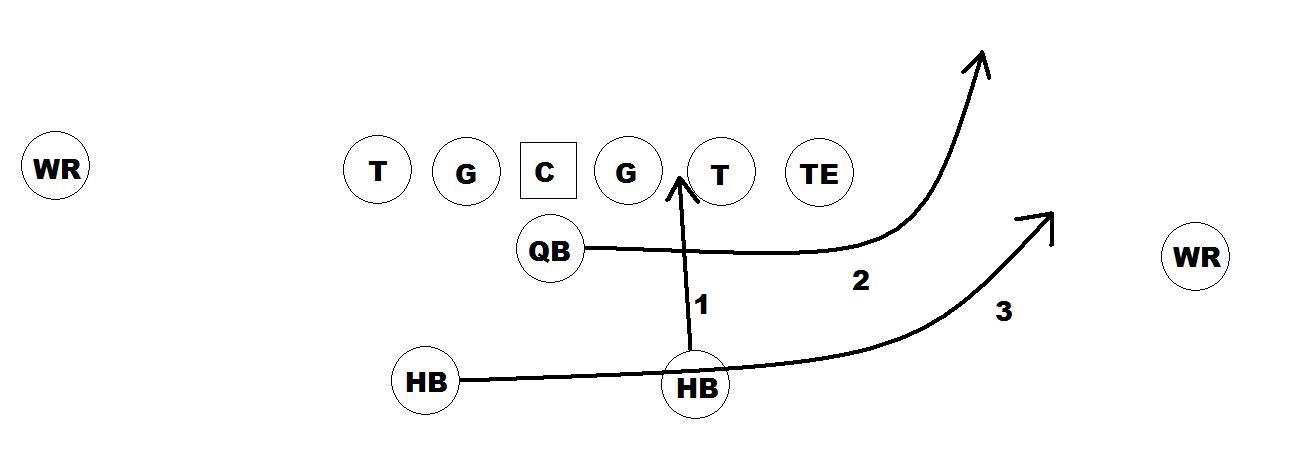
An example of an inside veer triple option

== Veer ==
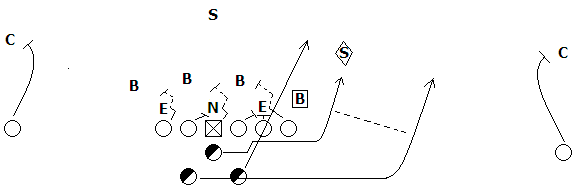
The Outside Veer (or "high dive") is shown vs. an Oklahoma defense (3–4 or 5–2). The square indicates the dive read while the diamond indicates the pitch read.

The veer triple option uses two halfbacks and a tight end (TE). The "inside veer" play is similar to the wishbone triple option, but the dive option is performed by the halfback on the side of the play, and the other halfback becomes the pitch man. The veer is more challenging to run to the weak side (the side without the tight end) because there is no lead blocker for the pitch man. The "outside veer" moves the halfback dive option outside the offensive tackle, forcing the outside linebacker to stop the halfback dive, and forcing the defensive backs to play the pitch option.

== I formation ==
Standard I formation

The triple option can be run out of the I formation as well. With two running backs, it is sometimes called the "I-veer", as the play is similar to the two running back veer offense. Three running back I formations such as the Maryland I and the stack I are more similar to the wishbone play.

Nebraska in 1980–2003 deployed an I formation triple option. They won 3 national titles with it in 1994, 1995, and 1997.

== Recent variations ==
In recent years, as spread and zone read offenses have become popular, many teams have begun to run variations of the triple option with the quarterback in the shotgun. This has been greatly popularized by the success of coaches such as Rich Rodriguez, Mark Helfrich, and Urban Meyer. The more traditional version of the triple option uses a quarterback under center and is advocated by the service academy coaches, including Fisher DeBerry, formerly of Air Force, and Paul Johnson, formerly head coach of Navy and Georgia Tech (who installed this offense at Hawai'i and Georgia Southern, the latter school winning several Division I Football Championship Subdivision titles using it).

Paul Johnson, along with his successor at Navy, Ken Niumatalolo, have had the most success with the triple option/veer in the last few years. The triple option can be used in the spread offense. Teams like Ohio State, Oregon, and Arizona have used an inside zone triple option from the spread. The quarterback reads the defensive end for "give" or "keep". If the defensive end squeezes down to take the dive, the quarterback will pull the ball and take his reading progression to the outside linebacker or defensive back. If the linebacker/defensive back takes the quarterback, the quarterback will pitch the ball to his running back who is running in formation with the quarterback.

=== Run-pass option ===
A 2009 NCAA rule change that allowed linemen to block three yards downfield on a pass (as opposed to one yard in the NFL) opened the college game to the run-pass option (RPO) plays. Much like in a traditional option attack, the quarterback "reads" the defense at the snap and quickly decides how to execute the play depending on the initial actions of one or two "key" defenders. In an RPO play, however, one or more receivers run a pass route, and the quarterback has the option to throw a pass. Because the offensive line (and usually some receivers) run block at the snap, any pass must be thrown very quickly, before blockers have pushed forward three yards. A properly executed RPO is difficult to defend, as a quarterback who correctly reads the defense will run the version of the play which has the best chance for success.

The rule change that resulted in the widespread use of RPOs by college offenses was controversial. By "destroy[ing] the ages-old division between passing plays and running plays" the RPO changes offense, defense and officiating roles. The Wall Street Journal highlighted the option in the lead-up to the 2017 playoff between Alabama and Clemson, in which both teams "will [try to] use [it] to win".

The RPO has also been utilized in the NFL despite rules disallowing linemen to block more than one yard downfield on passing plays, though NFL QBs must make quicker reads to avoid a penalty if they decide to throw a forward pass.
