= Air Force–Colorado State football rivalry =

American college football rivalry

- Air Force Falcons Colorado State Rams
- Sport: Football
- First meeting: November 30, 1957; Colorado State, 20–7
- Latest meeting: November 28, 2025; Air Force, 42–21
- Stadiums: Falcon Stadium; USAF Academy, Colorado, U.S. Canvas Stadium; Fort Collins, Colorado, U.S.
- Trophy: None (1957–1979); Ram–Falcon Trophy (1980–present)

Statistics
- Total meetings: 63
- All-time series: Air Force leads, 40–22–1 (.643)
- Trophy series: Air Force leads, 29–16 (.644)
- Largest victory: Air Force, 69–0 (1963)
- Longest win streak: Air Force, 7 (1983–1989, 2006–2012, 2016–2023)
- Current win streak: Air Force, 1 (2025)

The Air Force–Colorado State football rivalry is an American college football rivalry in Colorado between the U.S. Air Force Academy Falcons and Colorado State University Rams. The Ram–Falcon Trophy is awarded to the winner of the game.

== Ram–Falcon Trophy ==
Locations of Air Force and Colorado State

The origin of the Ram–Falcon Trophy is traced back to Shelly Godkin, a former ROTC commander at Colorado State. The trophy was carved by local Fort Collins artist, Bill Wrage, who donated several artistic works to Colorado State University. It was first awarded in 1980, when formerly independent Air Force joined Colorado State in the Western Athletic Conference (WAC); CSU won 21–9 on September 6. Both teams moved to the new Mountain West Conference in 1999; Air Force leads the trophy series 29–16 (.644).

== Recent Results ==
Air Force is 15–3 in the series since Troy Calhoun became the head coach at Air Force in 2007.

Air Force has also never lost in Canvas Stadium, winning all five games held in Canvas since the stadium opened in 2017 by a combined score of 190–104.

Due to Colorado State leaving for the Pac-12 in 2026, the rivalry has gone on a hiatus. The 2026 season was the first time the two teams didn't play each other since 1977. The teams were also in different conferences for the first time since 1979.

== Series Results ==
Air Force victories	Colorado State victories	Tie games

No.	Date	Location	Winning team		Losing team	
1	November 30, 1957	Denver, CO	Colorado State	20	Air Force	7
2	October 11, 1958	Denver, CO	Air Force	36	Colorado State	6
3	September 24, 1960	Denver, CO	Air Force	32	Colorado State	8
4	November 4, 1961	Denver, CO	Air Force	14	Colorado State	9
5	September 22, 1962	Colorado Springs, CO	Air Force	34	Colorado State	0
6	September 28, 1963	Colorado Springs, CO	Air Force	69	Colorado State	0
7	October 3, 1964	Colorado Springs, CO	Air Force	14	Colorado State	6
8	October 22, 1966	Colorado Springs, CO	Colorado State	41	Air Force	21
9	October 28, 1967	Colorado Springs, CO	Tie	17	Tie	17
10	October 19, 1968	Fort Collins, CO	Air Force	31	Colorado State	0
11	October 25, 1969	Colorado Springs, CO	#20 Air Force	28	Colorado State	7
12	October 3, 1970	Colorado Springs, CO	#10 Air Force	37	Colorado State	22
13	October 23, 1971	Fort Collins, CO	#20 Air Force	37	Colorado State	22
14	October 7, 1972	Fort Collins, CO	#19 Air Force	52	Colorado State	13
15	October 25, 1975	Fort Collins, CO	Colorado State	47	Air Force	10
16	October 16, 1976	Colorado Springs, CO	Colorado State	27	Air Force	3
17	October 14, 1978	Colorado Springs, CO	Colorado State	31	Air Force	13
18	October 27, 1979	Fort Collins, CO	Colorado State	20	Air Force	6
19	September 6, 1980	Fort Collins, CO	Colorado State	21	Air Force	9
20	October 3, 1981	Colorado Springs, CO	Air Force	28	Colorado State	14
21	October 16, 1982	Colorado Springs, CO	Colorado State	21	Air Force	11
22	September 3, 1983	Fort Collins, CO	Air Force	34	Colorado State	13
23	September 29, 1984	Colorado Springs, CO	Air Force	52	Colorado State	10
24	October 19, 1985	Fort Collins, CO	#10 Air Force	35	Colorado State	19
25	September 27, 1986	Colorado Springs, CO	Air Force	24	Colorado State	7
26	September 26, 1987	Fort Collins, CO	Air Force	27	Colorado State	19
27	September 3, 1988	Fort Collins, CO	Air Force	29	Colorado State	23
28	September 30, 1989	Fort Collins, CO	#24 Air Force	46	Colorado State	21
29	September 1, 1990	Colorado Springs, CO	Colorado State	35	Air Force	33
30	September 7, 1991	Fort Collins, CO	Air Force	31	Colorado State	26
31	October 17, 1992	Colorado Springs, CO	Colorado State	32	Air Force	28
32	September 11, 1993	Fort Collins, CO	Colorado State	8	Air Force	5

No.	Date	Location	Winning team		Losing team	
33	September 3, 1994	Colorado Springs, CO	Colorado State	34	Air Force	21
34	September 16, 1995	Colorado Springs, CO	Colorado State	27	#21 Air Force	20
35	November 2, 1996	Colorado Springs, CO	Colorado State	42	Air Force	41
36	September 20, 1997	Fort Collins, CO	Air Force	24	#23 Colorado State	0
37	September 17, 1998	Colorado Springs, CO	Air Force	30	Colorado State	27
38	November 18, 1999	Fort Collins, CO	Colorado State	41	Air Force	21
39	November 11, 2000	Colorado Springs, CO	Air Force	44	Colorado State	40
40	November 8, 2001	Fort Collins, CO	Colorado State	28	Air Force	21
41	October 31, 2002	Colorado Springs, CO	#24 Colorado State	31	Air Force	12
42	October 16, 2003	Fort Collins, CO	Colorado State	30	Air Force	20
43	November 20, 2004	Colorado Springs, CO	Air Force	47	Colorado State	17
44	September 29, 2005	Fort Collins, CO	Colorado State	41	Air Force	23
45	October 12, 2006	Colorado Springs, CO	Air Force	24	Colorado State	21
46	October 13, 2007	Fort Collins, CO	Air Force	45	Colorado State	21
47	November 8, 2008	Colorado Springs, CO	Air Force	38	Colorado State	17
48	October 31, 2009	Fort Collins, CO	Air Force	34	Colorado State	16
49	October 9, 2010	Colorado Springs, CO	#25 Air Force	49	Colorado State	27
50	November 26, 2011	Fort Collins, CO	Air Force	45	Colorado State	21
51	September 29, 2012	Colorado Springs, CO	Air Force	42	Colorado State	21
52	November 30, 2013	Fort Collins, CO	Colorado State	58	Air Force	13
53	November 28, 2014	Colorado Springs, CO	Air Force	27	#21 Colorado State	24
54	October 17, 2015	Fort Collins, CO	Colorado State	38	Air Force	23
55	November 12, 2016	Colorado Springs, CO	Air Force	49	Colorado State	46
56	October 28, 2017	Fort Collins, CO	Air Force	45	Colorado State	28
57	November 22, 2018	Colorado Springs, CO	Air Force	27	Colorado State	19
58	November 16, 2019	Fort Collins, CO	Air Force	38	Colorado State	21
59	November 13, 2021	Fort Collins, CO	Air Force	35	Colorado State	21
60	November 19, 2022	Colorado Springs, CO	Air Force	24	Colorado State	12
61	October 28, 2023	Fort Collins, CO	#19 Air Force	30	Colorado State	13
62	October 19, 2024	Colorado Springs, CO	Colorado State	21	Air Force	13
63	November 28, 2025	Fort Collins, CO	Air Force	42	Colorado State	21
Series: Air Force leads 40–22–1

== See also ==
- List of NCAA college football rivalry games
