= Sonny Lubick =

American football coach

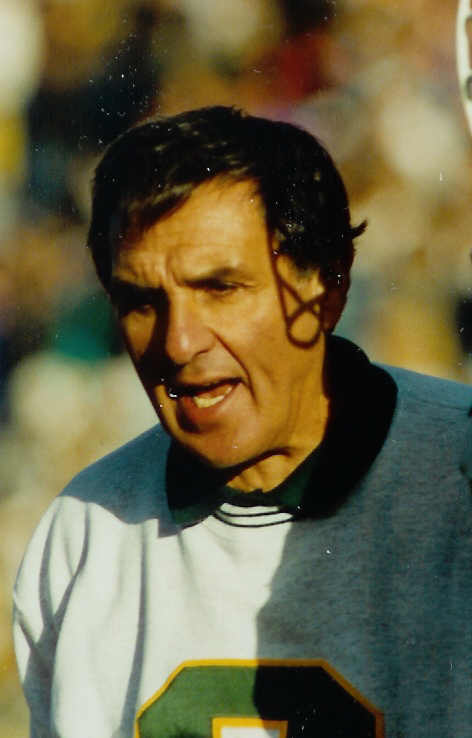
- Lubick in 1993

Biographical details
- Born: March 12, 1937 (age 89); Butte, Montana, U.S.

Coaching career (HC unless noted)
- 1962–1967: Butte HS (MT) (line)
- 1968–1969: Butte HS (MT)
- 1970: Montana State (backfield)
- 1971–1977: Montana State (DC)
- 1978–1981: Montana State
- 1982–1984: Colorado State (OC)
- 1985: Stanford (OLB)
- 1986–1988: Stanford (DB)
- 1989–1992: Miami (FL) (DC/LB)
- 1993–2007: Colorado State

Head coaching record
- Overall: 129–93 (college)
- Bowls: 3–6

Accomplishments and honors

Championships
- 1 Big Sky (1979); 3 WAC (1994–1995, 1997); 3 MWC (1999–2000, 2002)

Awards
- 2× MW Coach of the Year (1999, 2000) (Note: Co-winner with John Robinson in 2000.); 2× WAC Coach of the Year (1994, 1997)

Louis Matthew "Sonny" Lubick (born March 12, 1937) is a retired American football coach. He was the 15th head football coach at Colorado State University from 1993 to 2007. Lubick won or shared six Western Athletic Conference or Mountain West Conference titles, guided the program to nine bowl games and was named National Coach of the Year by Sports Illustrated in 1994.

Lubick's success has made him one of the most recognizable figures in the CSU and Fort Collins community, so much so that when Pat Stryker, head of the Bohemian Foundation, decided to donate $15.2 million toward extensive renovations of Hughes Stadium, she did so with the stipulation that the playing surface be named after Lubick. The stadium was then known as Sonny Lubick Field at Hughes Stadium until its closure after the 2016 season. As a result of the donation, CSU added 4,400 new seats and a video scoreboard in 2004, a new press box and suites in 2005, and a new FieldTurf surface in 2006. In 2016, the university announced that the playing surface at its new football stadium, which opened in 2017 as Colorado State Stadium and is now known as Canvas Stadium, would also be known as "Sonny Lubick Field", following an anonymous $20 million donation for that specific purpose.

== Montana State ==
A native of Butte, Montana, and a graduate from Western Montana in 1960, Lubick coached football at Butte High School for eight years, the last two as head coach. His collegiate coaching career began in Bozeman as an assistant at Montana State in 1970 under head coach Tom Parac. Sonny Holland became the head coach in 1971 and led the program for seven seasons, which included a Big Sky Conference title (6–0) and the Division II national title in 1976. Following Holland's retirement announcement a year later, Lubick was named head coach at MSU in November 1977.

Lubick's first season in 1978 was wildly successful, as the Bobcats finished 8–2 overall in the new Division I-AA and second place in the Big Sky at 4–2. The following year, the Bobcats won the Big Sky with a 6–1 league record, but were 6–4 overall and not invited to the four-team playoffs.

The following two years saw decline. In 1980, Montana State plummeted from first to sixth place in the Big Sky, finishing at 4–6 and 3–4 in league play. The Bobcats fell to 3–7 in 1981, and despite his popularity in Bozeman, Lubick was fired.

== Assistant coach ==
Lubick moved on to the Division I-A ranks as an assistant coach. His first stop was at Colorado State as offensive coordinator for Leon Fuller from 1982 to 1984. At the time, the CSU program generally regarded as one of the worst programs in college football. The Rams had been to just one bowl game in their history, and were coming off a winless 0–12 season in 1981. CSU wasn't overly successful in Lubick's three years as offensive coordinator, winning only 12 games total and only once getting to .500 in WAC play. Nonetheless, Lubick was a popular and likable figure in the Fort Collins and university community, something that would ultimately benefit him later in life.

In 1985, Lubick was hired by Jack Elway at Stanford University as an assistant coach. In 1989, Lubick joined Dennis Erickson's coaching staff at the University of Miami as the Hurricanes' defensive coordinator. While at Miami, Lubick molded a tough and physical Hurricane defense that featured the likes of Cortez Kennedy and Russell Maryland. Miami won two national championships in Lubick's four years there.

== Colorado State ==
=== 1993–1994 ===
Lubick returned to Colorado State in 1993 as head coach. Little had changed at CSU since Lubick had left the program a decade earlier. There had been a brief period of success under Lubick's predecessor, Earle Bruce, that featured the school's first-ever bowl win (32–31 over Oregon in the 1990 Freedom Bowl), but CSU was still considered a graveyard for college football. Since 1960, the program had recorded just seven winning seasons, and in that same span, the program had three winless seasons. Considering it a challenge, Lubick accepted the head coaching position at Colorado State prior to the 1993 season. Faced with a culture of losing, Lubick assembled a staff of assistants that included eventual Ohio State head coach Urban Meyer and began aggressively recruiting and attempting to change CSU's image.

Considering the dreadful state of the program he'd inherited, Lubick made the Rams respectable fairly quickly. After starting 1–4 in his first season, the Rams won three consecutive games to finish the season 5–6, providing hope that the program was headed in the right direction.

However, not even the most optimistic Rams fan anticipated what happened in 1994. Led by a defense that featured future NFL players Sean Moran and Brady Smith, Colorado State flew out of the gate 6–0 heading into a key game on October 8 against the #4 Arizona Wildcats in Tucson, Arizona. Known for their vaunted "Desert Swarm" defense, Arizona had been picked by several publications, including Sports Illustrated, to win the national championship, but it was CSU that took a stunning 14–6 lead. With Arizona driving to the CSU 21 in the second half, Garrett Sand forced a fumble that Moran recovered and ran back 79 yards for a touchdown. Regarded simply as "The Play" in CSU football history, the return ended up being the game-winning score, as Lubick and the Rams went on to win 21–16–at the time, the biggest upset in school history. Near-rioting broke out in Fort Collins as a result of celebrations from students and fans.

A victory the following week over UTEP set up a nationally televised showdown with Utah, also undefeated, at Hughes Stadium. With extra bleachers brought into the 30,000 seat facility, a crowd of 39,107, the largest in Hughes Stadium history, witnessed a heartbreaking 45–31 shootout loss. Despite the setback, the Rams recovered to win their final three games, including a dramatic 44–42 comeback win at Fresno State that sealed CSU's first-ever 10-win season, their first WAC championship, and their first conference title of any sort since winning the 1955 Skyline Conference title. The victory earned Colorado State their first-ever trip to the Holiday Bowl in San Diego, where the Rams lost a hard-fought 24–14 affair to Michigan. Though the season ended on a down note, it was the start of 10 straight winning seasons under Lubick, and also earned him National Coach of the Year honors from Sports Illustrated.

=== 1995–1999 ===
Lubick's Rams followed up their breakout campaign in 1994 with a strong 1995 season. With Smith earning WAC defensive player of the year honors, and safety Greg Myers earning All American honors for a second straight year, CSU finished the 1995 season with an 8–4 mark and a share of the WAC title. The Rams were once again invited to the Holiday Bowl, but this time they were downed by the Kansas State Wildcats by a score of 54–21. In 1996, the Rams posted another winning season, finishing 7–5 and tied for second place in the WAC. However, a lack of quality wins, and losses to Colorado, Oregon, Nebraska, and Wyoming kept the Rams out of a bowl game.

The 1997 season also got off to a difficult start. Colorado State blew a halftime lead against arch-rival Colorado in their second game to lose 31–21. Two weeks later, the Rams suffered a 24–0 shutout loss at home against Air Force to fall to 2–2. It would be the last game Lubick's Rams lost for the rest of the season. Led by quarterback Moses Moreno, the WAC Offensive Player of the Year, running back Kevin McDougal, and future Pittsburgh Steelers linebackers Joey Porter and Clark Haggans, Colorado State stormed through the rest of league play, with a 14–7 victory at Wyoming October 18 the closest they came to defeat. After defeating New Mexico in the WAC Championship Game, the Rams once again went to the Holiday Bowl, this time facing the Missouri Tigers. Down three at halftime, CSU scored 21 second-half points to defeat the Tigers 35–24, netting Lubick his first-ever bowl victory, extending a school record nine-game winning streak (the streak would end at ten in 1998), and finishing what is still the greatest season in school history at 11–2. During this period of success, Lubick reportedly received interest and coaching offers from several other high-profile programs, including Miami and USC. But the commitment to his program, and intense efforts from fans to keep the lovable coach in Fort Collins, lead to Lubick staying at CSU each time. In 1998, Lubick's Rams finished 8–4 and third in the WAC but were not invited to a postseason bowl.

Prior to the 1999 season, eight member schools of the WAC (Air Force, Colorado State, BYU, Utah, San Diego State, Wyoming, New Mexico, UNLV), upset over conference expansion that threatened to balloon travel costs and break up longstanding regional rivalries, broke away from the conference and formed a new league, the Mountain West Conference. But 1999 would be memorable for Ram fans for another reason. Since the day they began playing football, CSU had more often than not failed to beat their in-state rivals, the Colorado Buffaloes. With superior resources and (since moving to the Big Eight in 1947) playing in a superior league, Colorado often overshadowed Colorado State. Lubick had gone 0–3 in his first three games against Colorado. On September 4 the game, dubbed the Rocky Mountain Showdown, was played at a neutral site, Mile High Stadium in Denver for the second straight year, and the Rams were once again considered underdogs against the ranked Buffaloes. However, behind 189 rushing yards and two touchdowns from McDougal, the Rams blew out the Buffaloes 41–14, marking the first time in 13 years that CSU had beaten their in-state rivals. The victory was seen by many as the final step in CSU's ascension to legitimacy. Victories over Wyoming and Air Force also completed the "Front Range" sweep, and the Rams finished 8–4 again, this time tying for the Mountain West title. CSU was invited to the Liberty Bowl, but lost to Southern Miss 23–17.

=== 2000–2005 ===
In 2000 Lubick's Rams, led primarily by Mountain West Conference Offensive Player of the Year Matt Newton, defeated Colorado for the second straight season 28–24. The victory was the catalyst for a 10–2 season that included an outright Mountain West title and a 22–17 Liberty Bowl victory over Louisville. With the graduation of several key seniors and the preseason loss of starting running back Cecil Sapp to injury, Lubick faced a rebuilding year in 2001. The Rams still managed a 7–5 finish and a 45–20 New Orleans Bowl victory over North Texas.

2001 was also notable for the emergence of quarterback Bradlee Van Pelt. A transfer from Michigan State, Van Pelt's dual-threat capability as a running and passing quarterback would make him a two-time conference player of the year. But it was his game in 2002 against Colorado that made Van Pelt a cult hero in Fort Collins. After losing to CU in 2001, Van Pelt and the Rams, bolstered by the return of Sapp, went into their Rocky Mountain Showdown heavy underdogs against a Buffaloes team ranked sixth in the nation. Trailing 14–13 late in the fourth quarter, Van Pelt broke loose on a 26-yard touchdown run. As he neared the goal line, Van Pelt turned and spiked the football off of CU cornerback Roderick Sneed's helmet as he scored what would be the game-winning touchdown. Following the game, Van Pelt called CU "the sorriest sixth-ranked team in the nation he had ever faced". It was the second biggest upset in school history, and further added to Van Pelt's following in Fort Collins. Though the outspoken quarterback occasionally gave Lubick problems, the 2002 season would be another banner season. With Sapp setting the school single-season rushing record, the Rams finished 2002 with a 10–4 record and another Mountain West Conference title.

The 2003 Ram football team was considered by many to be the best team in Lubick's tenure, if not all of CSU history, prior to the season. Though Sapp was gone, Van Pelt and many other seniors returned, and high-profile Colorado transfer Marcus Houston was added to the mix. The Rams entered the season ranked 24th in the nation and with hopes of cracking the Bowl Championship Series. Those hopes were quickly dashed when the Rams were upset in their opener by CU 42–35. Though CSU did make a bowl game for the fifth straight season, the Rams' 7–6 finish was the start of a down period for Lubick and his program. With Van Pelt gone, CSU faced another rebuilding year in 2004. A particularly devastating loss at Folsom Field against Colorado on September 4, in which Lubick later admitted to mismanaging CSU's final series that ended in the Rams failing in three plays from CU's one-yard line to score what would have been a game-winning touchdown in a 27–24 loss, led to a 4–7 finish, the worst year in Lubick's tenure.

The 2005 season started once again with another devastating loss at Colorado on September 3. Leading 21–10 after three quarters, three interceptions allowed CU to tie the game, and Mason Crosby kicked a game-winning 47-yard field goal with five seconds left to give the Buffs a 31–28 win. This time the Rams regrouped. Behind school record-setting wide receiver David Anderson, and buoyed by the surprising emergence of thousand yard sophomore running back Kyle Bell, CSU finished the regular season 6–5 and tied for second place in the Mountain West. One of the highlights of the 2005 season was the Rams maintaining the Bronze Boot with a 39–31 victory over Wyoming in Fort Collins. However, a blowout 51–30 loss to Navy in the 2005 Poinsettia Bowl seemed to be another setback.

=== 2006–2008 ===
Following the 2005 season, Lubick signed a three-year contract extension that would have made him CSU's coach through the 2009 season. Unfortunately, the Lubick family was dealt a difficult blow in the offseason. In February, Lubick's youngest son, Marc, was diagnosed with rhabdomyosarcoma cancer. The younger Lubick had just finished his first season as Colorado State's wide receivers coach, a position he took over after his brother Matt left the program in 2005 after spending the previous four seasons coaching that position under his father. Marc Lubick underwent chemotherapy and coached during the 2006 season.

The Rams entered the 2006 season with high hopes, but on and off-field problems quickly beset the program. Just three days prior to the season-opening game against Weber State on September 2, preseason all-conference back Kyle Bell was lost for the season with a torn ACL during a practice. A sophomore in 2005, Bell had run for over 1,000 yards and figured to be the centerpiece of CSU's offense. The Rams defeated Weber State 30–6 but lost another starter prior to their game against archrival Colorado on September 9, this time due to a scandal. Several players, including preseason All-MWC cornerback Robert Herbert, were suspended indefinitely from the program after being charged with fraud in a campus check-cashing scandal. Herbert had arguably been the team's best defender in 2005.

Despite these losses, however, the Rams started the 2006 season strong. On September 9, after three years of frustratingly close losses, the Rams defeated their in-state rival CU 14–10 at Invesco Field at Mile High Stadium. After dropping a 28–10 decision at Nevada the following week, CSU rebounded with a road win at Fresno State and homecoming win against UNLV to go to 4–1. Playing at in-state rival Air Force on October 12, the Rams opened up a 21–3 halftime lead and appeared to be well on their way to a fifth victory. However, the Falcons rallied for 21 unanswered points and came back to defeat CSU 24–21. The loss was the beginning of one of the worst slides in Lubick's tenure. The following week Colorado State was shut out 24–0 at Wyoming in the annual Border War series. Home losses to New Mexico and BYU followed, and the Rams ultimately never recovered. Losses to Utah, TCU, and San Diego State concluded a season-ending, seven-game losing streak, leaving CSU 4–8 and tied for last place in the Mountain West, by far the worst year in Lubick's tenure and leading some fans and followers to question whether Lubick should be retained or released.

Lubick's 14th season got an immediate boost with the return of Bell. With their all-conference halfback in the fold, as well as the most seniors returning in Lubick's tenure, the Rams had a team that figured to rebound from the dismal 2006 season. But a difficult early schedule challenged CSU. Opening against Colorado at Invesco Field at Mile High, the Rams had a familiar finish against their in-state rival. Despite big games from Bell and Kory Sperry, CSU squandered an 11-point 3rd quarter lead and went into overtime. On their possession, Caleb Hanie threw an interception in the end zone. CU would win in overtime, 31–28.

Following the CU loss, Colorado State faced one of its most daunting home games ever against then-10th ranked California. The Bears were heavily favored but Colorado State, playing in its home opener, was game. CSU lost a thriller 34–28, their 9th straight loss dating back to 2006. Even worse, the bizarre chain of season-ending ACL injuries to key players continued when Sperry was lost with a torn ACL during the game. It was the 3rd straight season a key player for the Rams had been lost to the injury. Losses continued to mount. Dating back to 2006, CSU lost 11 straight games before defeating UNLV at midseason. Colorado State finished the season 3–9, a new low in the Lubick tenure. The lone bright spot of the year came at the end of the season when the Rams regained the Bronze Boot with a 36–28 win over Wyoming at Hughes Stadium. It would end up being the final game in Lubick's tenure at CSU.

On November 26, 2007, just 3 days after the Wyoming win, it was announced that Lubick was being relieved of his duties as head coach. Colorado State University Athletic Director Paul Kowalczyk announced that Lubick has been offered a public relations position as senior associate athletic director, focused on fundraising and serving as a goodwill ambassador for Rams athletics. Lubick was replaced by Steve Fairchild, a former Lubick assistant who returned after serving as offensive coordinator for the NFL's Buffalo Bills.

Lubick's tenure at Colorado State was one of the most successful rebuilding projects in college football history. When he arrived in 1993, he inherited a program that had been to only two bowl games in its entire history and had only cracked the eight-win barrier six times. He left it as a regional powerhouse with six conference titles (four outright, two shared). He also led the Rams to nine bowl games (winning three) and four 10-win seasons.

On February 2, 2008, the Rocky Mountain News reported that Lubick had declined the university's offer to remain in a fundraising role. The paper quoted a source as saying Lubick, 70, had talked with Florida coach Urban Meyer about joining the Gators' staff. Meyer was an assistant under Lubick in the early 1990s. The job was reported to involve breaking down film and helping with recruiting. However, Lubick did not take that job, and remained in Fort Collins, working with several local businesses, and opening a restaurant (Sonny Lubick Steakhouse) in downtown Fort Collins.

== Personal life ==
Lubick was born to mother Francis and Doc Lubick in Butte, Montana. He grew up with older sister Elizabeth, and younger siblings Donna and Jimmy.

Lubick is married to wife Carol Jo and has three children: daughter Michelle, and sons Matt and Marc, both of whom have been assistant coaches under their father before continuing onto their own careers. There is a steakhouse in Downtown Fort Collins named after Lubick – Sonny Lubick Steakhouse.

In Butte, Lubick was a friend and classmate of Evel Knievel.

== Head coaching record ==
=== College ===
Year	Team	Overall	Conference	Standing	Bowl/playoffs	Coaches^{#}	AP^{°}
Montana State Bobcats (Big Sky Conference) (1978–1981)
1978	Montana State	8–2	4–2	T–2nd			9
1979	Montana State	6–4	6–1	1st			9
1980	Montana State	4–6	3–4	T–6th			
1981	Montana State	3–7	1–6	7th			
Montana State:		21–19	14–13				
Colorado State Rams (Western Athletic Conference) (1993–1998)
1993	Colorado State	5–6	5–3	T–4th			
1994	Colorado State	10–2	7–1	1st	L Holiday	14	16
1995	Colorado State	8–4	6–2	T–1st	L Holiday		
1996	Colorado State	7–5	6–2	T–2nd (Pacific)			
1997	Colorado State	11–2	7–1	1st (Pacific)	W Holiday	16	17
1998	Colorado State	8–4	5–3	T–3rd (Mountain)			
Colorado State Rams (Mountain West Conference) (1999–2007)
1999	Colorado State	8–4	5–2	T–1st	L Liberty		
2000	Colorado State	10–2	6–1	1st	W Liberty	15	14
2001	Colorado State	7–5	5–2	2nd	W New Orleans		
2002	Colorado State	10–4	6–1	1st	L Liberty		
2003	Colorado State	7–6	4–3	3rd	L San Francisco		
2004	Colorado State	4–7	3–4	T–4th			
2005	Colorado State	6–6	5–3	T–3rd	L Poinsettia		
2006	Colorado State	4–8	1–7	T–8th			
2007	Colorado State	3–9	2–6	T–7th			
Colorado State:		108–74	80–40				
Total:		129–93					
National championship Conference title Conference division title or championship game berth
^{#}Rankings from final Coaches Poll.; ^{°}Rankings from final AP Poll.
