= Kevin O'Connell =

American football player and coach (born 1985)

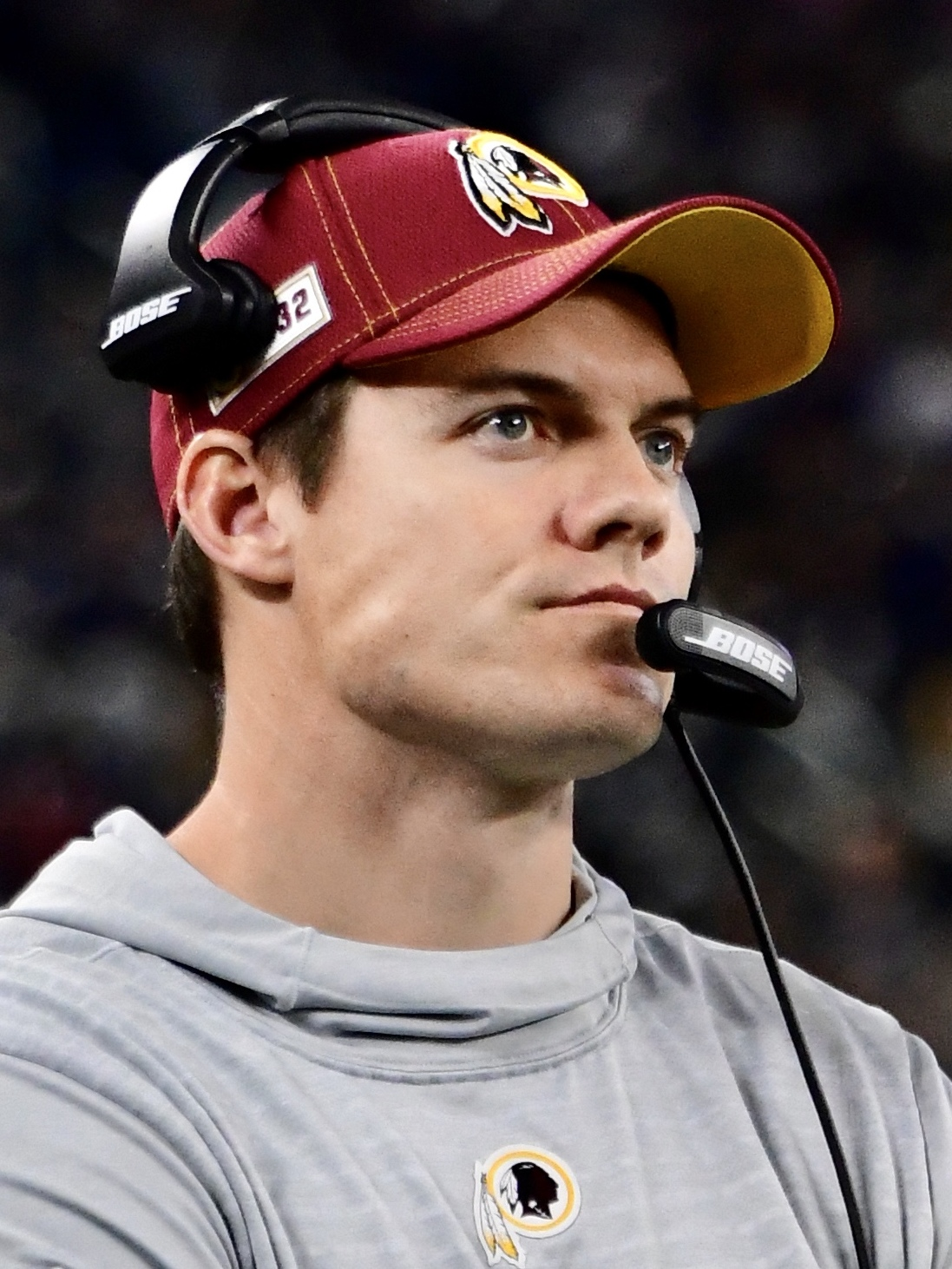
- O'Connell with the Washington Redskins in 2019

Minnesota Vikings
- Title: Head coach

Personal information
- Born: May 25, 1985 (age 41); Knoxville, Tennessee, U.S.
- Listed height: 6 ft 5 in (1.96 m)
- Listed weight: 225 lb (102 kg)

Career information
- Position: Quarterback (No. 5)
- High school: La Costa Canyon (Carlsbad, California)
- College: San Diego State (2003–2007)
- NFL draft: 2008: 3rd round, 94th overall pick

Career history

Playing
- New England Patriots (2008); Detroit Lions (2009)*; New York Jets (2009–2010); Miami Dolphins (2011)*; New York Jets (2011); San Diego Chargers (2012)*
- * Offseason or practice squad member only

Coaching
- Cleveland Browns (2015) Quarterbacks coach; San Francisco 49ers (2016) Special projects; Washington Redskins (2017–2019); Quarterbacks coach (2017); Quarterbacks coach & passing game coordinator (2018); Offensive coordinator (2019); Los Angeles Rams (2020–2021) Offensive coordinator; Minnesota Vikings (2022–present) Head coach

Awards and highlights
- As a player: Second-team All-MW (2007); As a head coach: AP NFL Coach of the Year (2024); As an assistant coach: Super Bowl champion (LVI)

Career NFL statistics
- Passing attempts: 6
- Passing completions: 4
- Completion percentage: 66.7%
- TD–INT: 0–0
- Passing yards: 23
- Passer rating: 73.6
- Stats at Pro Football Reference

Head coaching record
- Regular season: 50–27 (.649)
- Postseason: 0–2 (.000)
- Career: 50–29 (.633)
- Coaching profile at Pro Football Reference

Kevin William O'Connell (born May 25, 1985), nicknamed "KOC", is an American professional football coach and former quarterback who is the head coach for the Minnesota Vikings of the National Football League (NFL). He played college football for the San Diego State Aztecs from 2004 to 2007 and in the NFL for five seasons from 2008 to 2012, with his longest tenure (2009–2011) as a player with the New York Jets.

O'Connell and his family lived in Tennessee, New York, and California. He attended high school in Carlsbad, California, at La Costa Canyon High School. After graduation from high school in 2004, he enrolled at San Diego State University and played quarterback for the Aztecs, starting for three seasons.

The New England Patriots selected Kevin O'Connell in the third round of the 2008 NFL draft. He played five years as a quarterback in the NFL, with New England in 2008, the Detroit Lions in 2009, the New York Jets from 2009 to 2011, the Miami Dolphins and the San Diego Chargers in 2012. From 2013 to 2014, retiring from the NFL, O'Connell served as a private instructor for quarterbacks. O'Connell's NFL coaching career began in 2015; he held various assistant coaching roles on the Cleveland Browns, San Francisco 49ers, Washington Redskins, and Los Angeles Rams (where he won Super Bowl LVI as offensive coordinator in the 2021 season). Immediately afterward, O'Connell signed a deal as head coach of the Minnesota Vikings, where he led the team to the NFC North division title in his first season with the franchise, and made the postseason in two out of the first three seasons as head coach. He was also honored as the 2024 AP NFL Coach of the Year.

== Early life and education ==
Born in Knoxville, Tennessee, on May 25, 1985, O'Connell is the son of Suzanne and Bill O'Connell, a former FBI agent. Bill O'Connell played football for Villanova University in Villanova, a western suburb of Philadelphia.

During O'Connell's childhood, while his dad worked in the FBI, Kevin and his older sister Kelly, moved around frequently due to their father's work. the family moved to New York in 1990, and eventually to Carlsbad, California north of San Diego. Kevin shifted from playing running back to quarterback while he was in middle school, before moving to La Costa Canyon High School in Carlsbad. He lettered in both football and basketball in high school. In football as a junior, he passed for 980 yards and seven touchdowns. As a senior, he was named the team's Most Valuable Player and selected to All-League, All-North County, and All-San Diego teams. In basketball, he was a two-year letterman, and a teammate of Arizona standout player, Chase Budinger.

Kevin O'Connell graduated from La Costa Canyon High School in 2003. He earned a degree in political science from San Diego State University in December 2007.

== College playing career ==
=== 2003 and 2004 seasons ===
On February 1, 2003, O'Connell committed to play football for Tom Craft's San Diego State Aztecs football team. He came to San Diego State as "a player we can build the offensive class around," according to Craft.

As a true freshman in 2003, O'Connell, age 18, and sophomore Matt Dlugolecki were backups to Adam Hall who was coming off a strong junior season in 2002. Craft stated, "With a senior quarterback, the logical step is to redshirt Kevin O'Connell. But we are not going to define the situation until we see everyone in August." When Hall was injured during the regular season, Craft began to dress O'Connell during games, but not play O'Connell, but rather to get him used to traveling and dressing with the team. O'Connell did not see any game action in 2003, registered no statistics, and retained four years of eligibility under the NCAA's redshirt rule.

O'Connell performed well in the annual spring game in March 2004, but Dlugolecki was named the starting quarterback during the spring. While O'Connell was touted as the team's "stronger armed quarterback," he spent the 2004 season as San Diego State's No. 2 quarterback behind Dlugolecki. In the season opener against I-AA Idaho State, O'Connell threw his first career touchdown pass. Dlugolecki started 7 games, getting injured in the 7th game, promoting O'Connell's first start.

In his first collegiate start, O'Connell led the Aztecs to a 19–9 loss to a New Mexico team that finished second in the Mountain West Conference and was led by DonTrell Moore. O'Connell completed 16 of 32 passes for 165 yards and one touchdown. In his second start, the Aztecs lost to a No. 9 Utah team that finished the season ranked No. 4 and No. 5 in both the AP and Coaches polls respectively. The next week, the Aztecs were blown out by the BYU Cougars, 49–16. After the loss to BYU, O'Connell led San Diego State to victories over Air Force (37–31) and UNLV (21–3). O'Connell completed 33 of 69 passes for 407 yards with 3 touchdowns in those games.

=== 2005 season ===
In the spring of 2005, O'Connell was in a three-way competition for San Diego State's starting quarterback job. 2004's returning starter Matt Dluglocecki was returning from injury, and redshirt freshman, Darren Mougey was expected to make a push for playing time. In April 2005, Craft said, "We want to make the decision early, hopefully in the first week of practice. It will be an open three-way battle. We just want to make the decision early so we can be ready for our game against UCLA. We'll stay with one guy, unlike last year." In the 2005 spring game, O'Connell didn't participate due to his recovery from shoulder surgery, and gave Dluglocecki, Mougey and Kevin Craft opportunities to take all of the repetitions. After fall practice, Tom Craft announced his depth chart with O'Connell as his No. 1 quarterback. O'Connell was the starting quarterback in 12 games for the 2005 San Diego State Aztecs football team which compiled a 5–7 record.

On September 24, 2005, O'Connell had a career-high four touchdown passes in a 52–21 victory over San Jose State. After the game, O'Connell was asked for his reaction to offense improving and responded, "We were able to do some big things. We're going to try to take what we learned from the first four games and apply it for the rest of the season."

On October 15, 2005, O'Connell led the Aztecs to a 28–19 upset victory over a Utah Utes team led by Brian Johnson. O'Connell completed 17 of 23 passes for 219 yards and three touchdowns. In his first match up against a No. 20 TCU team that finished the season ranked No. 11 and No. 9 in the AP and Coaches polls respectively, the Aztecs lost 23–20. O'Connell threw a game-high 235 yards, two interceptions, with a rushing touchdown and passing touchdown. In the final three games of the 2005 regular season, O'Connell completed 63 of 102 passes for 802 yards, six touchdowns, and two interceptions. For the season as a whole, he completed 233 of 375 passes for 2,663 yards, 19 touchdowns and twelve interceptions. Following the conclusion of the season, Tom Craft was relived of his duties as head coach.

=== 2006 season ===
In the spring of 2006, O'Connell was in a three-way competition for San Diego State's starting quarterback job again. When new head coach Chuck Long was appointed the head coach, he wanted to see what he had between the three quarterbacks. The 2006 competition pitted O'Connell against sophomores Mongey and Kevin Craft. In April 2006, Long said, "It felt that way today. His experience definitely showed up today, and I thought he commanded well all game. Kevin Craft and Darren (Mougey) had their moments as well, but you could sense (O'Connell's) experience. He had a nice day." In the 2006 spring game, O'Connell impressed observers as he completed 15 of 26 passes for 155 yards with a touchdown and an interception. Long said after fall camp, "Kevin O'Connell's had a great, great camp. He had a nice drive today. He's our captain and he'll go in number one, and we're going to practice that way. Darren Mougey and Kevin Craft both played well today and that's what you want – a healthy competition."

In his first start of the season, O'Connell and the Aztecs lost 34–27 to a UTEP Miners team that was led by Jordan Palmer. In the first half of the game, O'Connell left with a thumb injury. He would miss the next six games after undergoing thumb surgery.

In relief of starting quarterback Kevin Craft, O'Connell lead the Aztecs to a victory over UNLV. O'Connell rushed for a touchdown on his first drive and finished the game, completing all 7 passes he attempted for 68 yards. O'Connell reclaimed his starting position with the team the next game.

After the win against UNLV, O'Connell and the Aztecs suffered losses to TCU (52–0) and New Mexico (41–14). O'Connell completed 29 of 55 passes for 325 yards in those games. In the final game of the season, a 17–6 win to Colorado State, closing out a 3–9 season for the Aztecs. O'Connell finished the season moving into 7th place all-time for the Aztecs.

=== 2007 season ===
In 2007, his final season at San Diego State, O'Connell started 12 games at quarterback for the 2007 San Diego State Aztecs football team with an 4–8 record. For the first time in his college career, he entered the season as the unquestioned starting quarterback. In the fifth game of the season, O'Connell led San Diego State to a 52–17 victory over Portland State. O'Connell completed 19 of 31 passes for career-highs with 443 yards and five touchdowns.

For the season, O'Connell completed 257 of 439 passes for 3,063 yards, 15 touchdowns, and 8 interceptions. He was named Second Team All-Mountain West. O'Connell was a four-year team captain, he started 33 games. That is the sixth-most among SDSU quarterbacks, and O'Connell ranked first in school history in career rushing yards and second in career rushing touchdowns among quarterbacks. In 2007, he led the team in rushing yards. In passing, O'Connell ranked tenth in yardage, eighth in attempts, and seventh in completions.

== Professional playing career ==
=== Pre-draft ===
O'Connell played in both the 2008 Hula Bowl and the 2008 East-West Shrine Game. He was the Kai team quarterback in the 2008 Hula Bowl, leading the offense and was one of the Kai team's only bright spots. O'Connell was 11-of-21 for 147 yards and completed the pass which resulted in the Kai's only score of the game.

At the 2008 NFL Combine, O'Connell ran the 40-yard dash in 4.61 seconds; only University of San Diego quarterback Josh Johnson had a faster time among quarterbacks.

Pre-draft measurables
Height	Weight	Arm length	Hand span	40-yard dash	10-yard split	20-yard split	20-yard shuttle	Three-cone drill	Vertical jump	Broad jump
6 ft 5 in (1.96 m)	225 lb (102 kg)	34 1/8 in (0.87 m)	8 7/8 in (0.23 m)	4.61 s	1.60 s	2.71 s	4.38 s	7.01 s	31.0 in (0.79 m)	9 ft 5 in (2.87 m)
All values from NFL Combine

=== New England Patriots ===
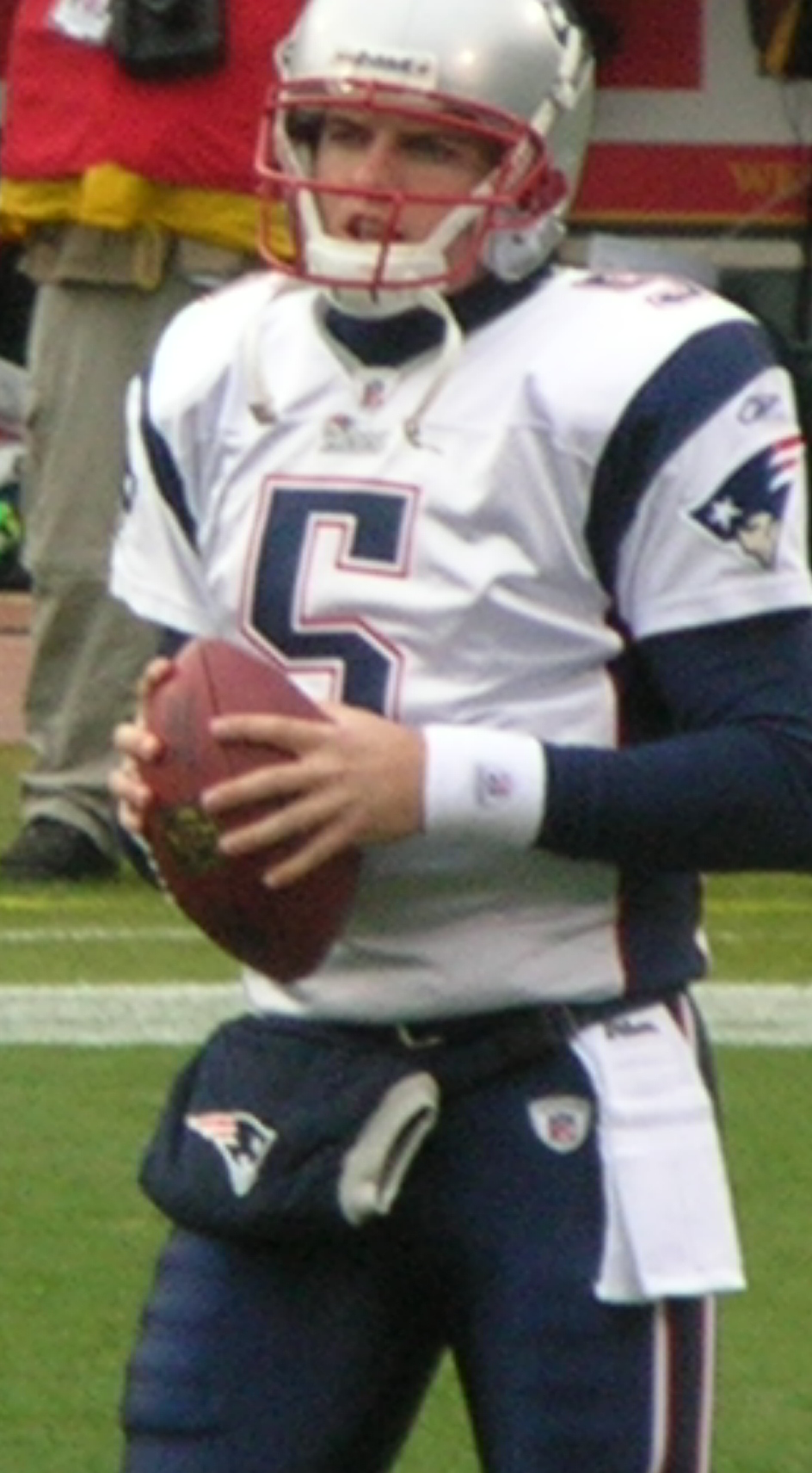
O'Connell in 2008

The New England Patriots selected O'Connell with their fourth pick (94th overall) in the third round of the 2008 NFL draft. During the 2008 season, playing under head coach Bill Belichick, O'Connell rushed for a touchdown in the 2008 preseason against the New York Giants in the fourth quarter, in a game the Patriots eventually lost 19–14. O'Connell made his NFL debut on September 21, 2008, in the fourth quarter against the Miami Dolphins, throwing his first four career passes and completing three. On December 21, in a 47–7 victory over the Arizona Cardinals, O'Connell completed 1 of 2 passes (50%) for −2 yards and rushed 3 times for −6 yards.

Going into the 2009 season, O'Connell was competing with veteran quarterback Andrew Walter, signed after his release from the Oakland Raiders, and undrafted free agent rookie Brian Hoyer of Michigan State, for the backup position behind Tom Brady. In an August 20 game against the Cincinnati Bengals, O'Connell completed 9 of 16 passes for 90 yards. In the third preseason game in the second half, O'Connell threw two interceptions and only threw three completions on 10 attempts. Two days later, on August 30, the Patriots waived O'Connell.

=== Detroit Lions ===
O'Connell was claimed off waivers by the Detroit Lions on September 1, 2009. O'Connell appeared in the Lions final preseason game, but saw minimal playing time.

=== New York Jets (first stint) ===
On September 6, 2009, the Lions traded O'Connell to the New York Jets for a seventh round 2011 draft pick. He was named a team captain for the September 20 game against the New England Patriots.

On August 31, 2010, New York released O'Connell. O'Connell then found that he had a torn labrum in his throwing arm, an injury he had received during the preseason, which required surgery. After his release, the New York Jets re-signed O'Connell to a two-year deal. He had been on the injured reserve list and was later released again on July 29, 2011.

=== Miami Dolphins ===
On August 5, 2011, O'Connell signed with the Miami Dolphins but was waived on September 3.

=== New York Jets (second stint) ===
O'Connell was claimed off waivers by the Jets on September 4, 2011.

=== San Diego Chargers ===
O'Connell was signed by the San Diego Chargers on July 29, 2012, to be an emergency back-up during the Chargers' practices with Charlie Whitehurst suffering an injury and Kyle Boller having recently retired. He was released on August 12.

== Career statistics ==
=== NFL ===
Year	Team	Games		Passing								Rushing			
Year	Team	GP	GS	Cmp	Att	Pct	Yds	Y/A	TD	Int	Rtg	Att	Yds	Avg	TD
2008	NE	2	0	4	6	66.7	23	3.8	0	0	73.6	3	−6	−2.0	0
Career		2	0	4	6	66.7	23	3.8	0	0	73.6	3	−6	−2.0	0

=== College ===
Year	Team	Games			Passing								Rushing			
Year	Team	GP	GS	Record	Cmp	Att	Pct	Yds	Avg	TD	INT	Rtg	Att	Yds	Avg	TD
2003	San Diego State	0	0	—	Redshirted											
2004	San Diego State	9	5	2–3	115	236	48.7	1,328	5.6	9	9	101.0	73	347	4.8	1
2005	San Diego State	12	12	5–7	233	375	62.1	2,663	7.1	19	12	132.1	140	402	2.9	5
2006	San Diego State	6	4	1–3	59	101	58.4	635	6.3	3	5	111.1	47	155	3.3	2
2007	San Diego State	12	12	4–8	257	439	58.5	3,063	7.0	15	8	124.8	135	408	3.0	11
Career		39	33	12–21	664	1,151	57.7	7,689	6.7	46	31	121.1	395	1,312	3.3	19

== Coaching career ==
=== Cleveland Browns ===
After spending the previous two years as a private quarterbacks coach in Carlsbad, California with clients including Johnny Manziel, Logan Thomas, Marcus Mariota, and Bryce Petty, it was announced on February 17, 2015, that O'Connell was hired as the quarterbacks coach of the Cleveland Browns, reuniting him with Mike Pettine, who was the defensive coordinator for the Jets during O'Connell's stint as a player there, as well as Manziel, who was a client of O’Connell’s prior to the 2014 NFL Draft.

=== San Francisco 49ers ===
O'Connell was hired to the offensive staff of the San Francisco 49ers on February 26, 2016.

=== Washington Redskins ===
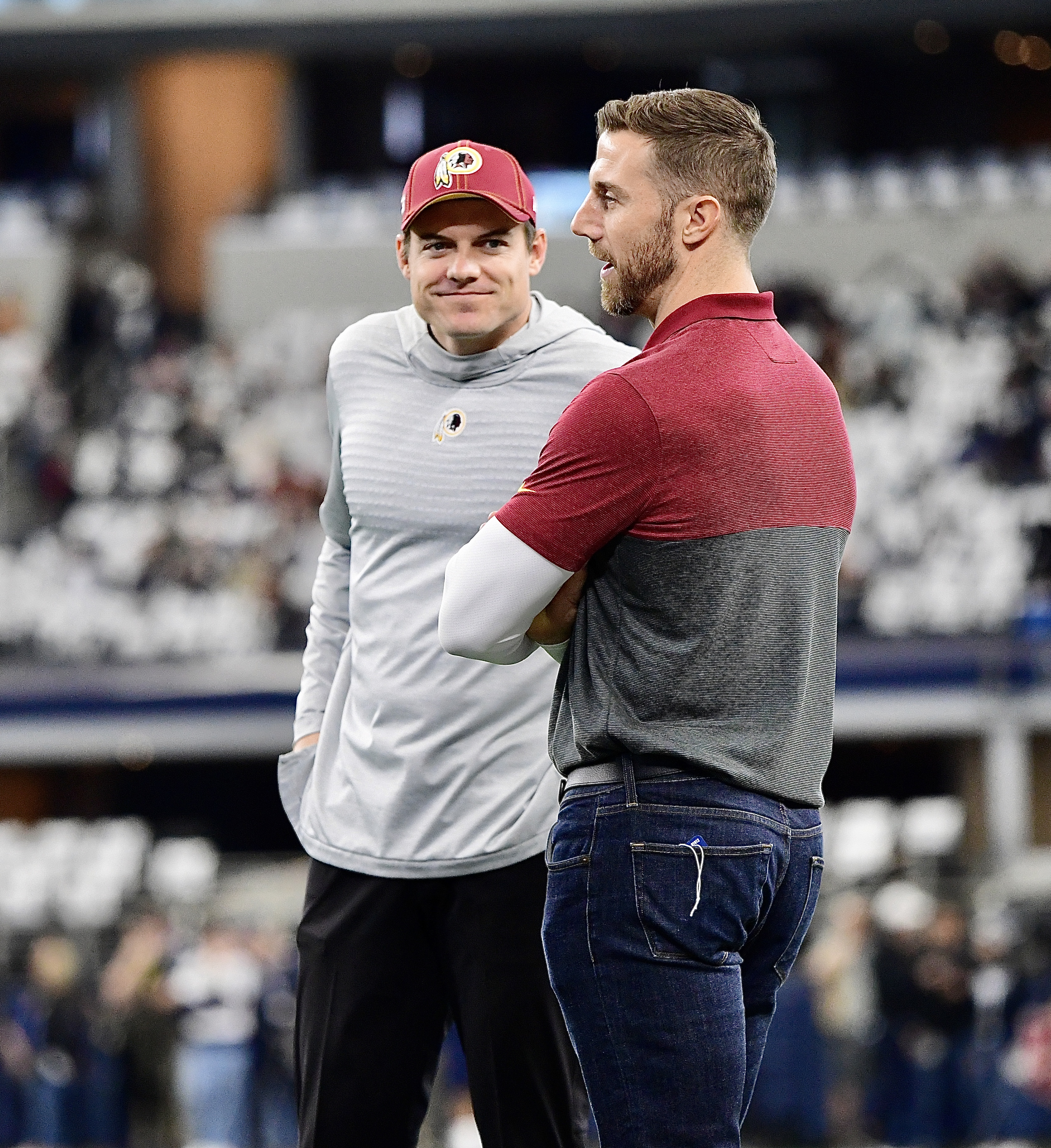
O'Connell (left) with Alex Smith in December 2019

On January 20, 2017, O'Connell was hired as the quarterbacks coach for the Washington Redskins under head coach Jay Gruden. In 2019, with Bill Callahan as the interim head coach, O'Connell was promoted to offensive coordinator. He was not retained by incoming new head coach Ron Rivera.

=== Los Angeles Rams ===
On January 16, 2020, O'Connell was hired by the Los Angeles Rams to be their new offensive coordinator. In his second season with the Rams, their offense ranked second-best in receiving touchdowns (41), fifth-highest in total yards (4,893), and eighth-best in total touchdowns (63) as the team won Super Bowl LVI against the Cincinnati Bengals 23–20.

=== Minnesota Vikings ===
On February 16, 2022, just three days after winning Super Bowl LVI, O'Connell was hired by the Minnesota Vikings as the 10th head coach in their franchise history. The hiring reunited him with quarterback Kirk Cousins, whom O'Connell had coached in 2017 (Cousins' final year with the Washington Redskins). O'Connell won his first game as head coach against the Green Bay Packers in Week 1 of the 2022 season by a score of 23–7.

O'Connell led the Vikings to a 13–4 record on the season, tying Matt LaFleur and Jim Harbaugh for the second-most wins for a rookie head coach in NFL history, which included an 11–0 record in games decided by one score, including the biggest comeback in NFL history. The Vikings won the NFC North for the first time since 2017, which was good enough for the NFC's third seed, but were defeated by the New York Giants in the Wild Card Round by a score of 31–24. In 2023, the Vikings regressed, losing the first three games of the season, then losing Kirk Cousins for the year due to an Achilles injury in a Week 8 tilt against the Packers. Despite a surprising pair of wins under freshly acquired quarterback Joshua Dobbs, the Vikings lost six of their last seven games finishing the year with a 7–10 record, the only win in that stretch being 3–0 over the Las Vegas Raiders.

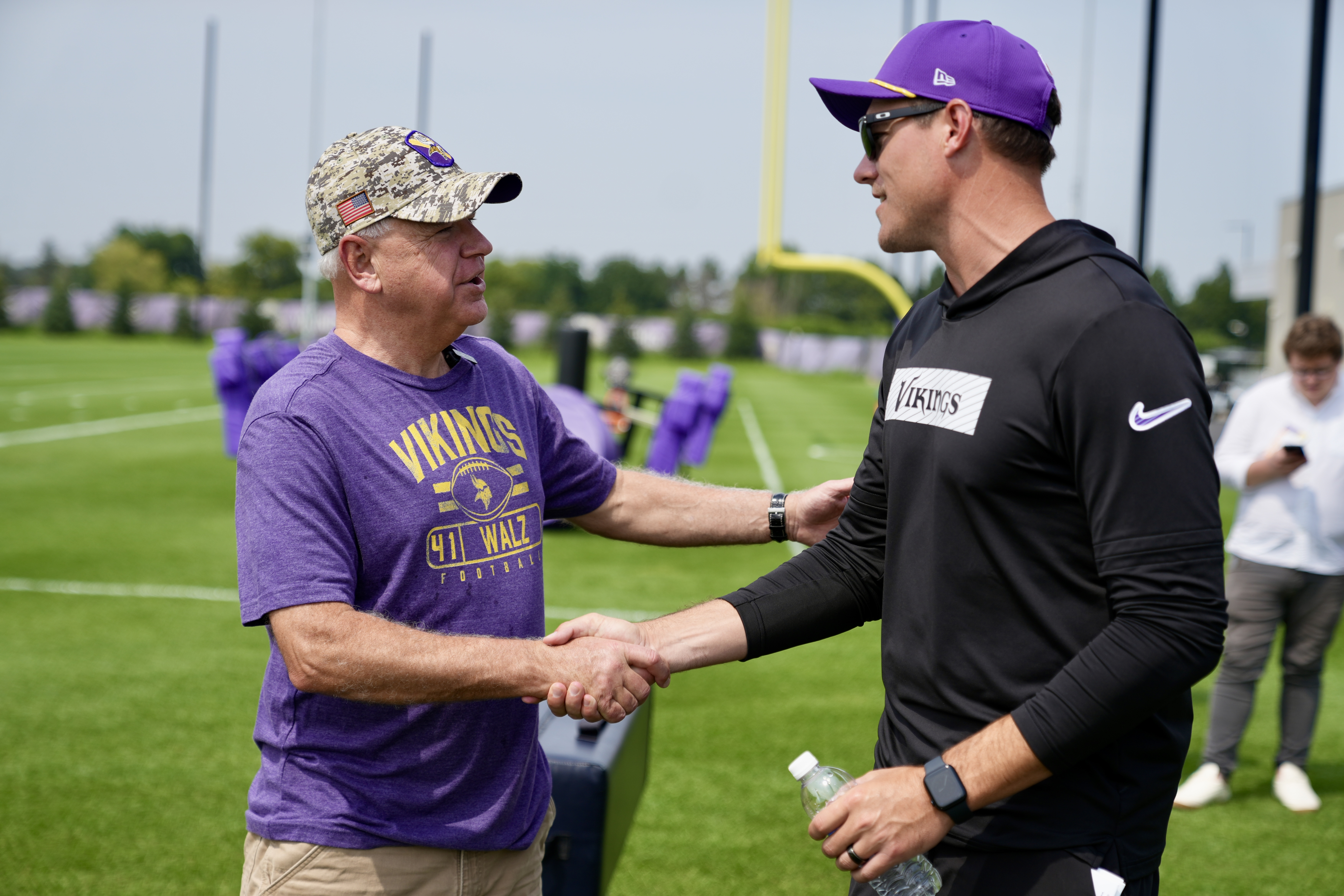
O'Connell (right) with Minnesota governor Tim Walz in 2024

After Kirk Cousins left the Vikings for the Atlanta Falcons after the season, O'Connell worked closely with veteran free agent quarterback Sam Darnold and rookie first round pick J. J. McCarthy in the 2024 offseason. A preseason knee injury to McCarthy complicated the team's plans for quarterback progression, leading to Darnold becoming the sole starter for 2024. O'Connell guided the Vikings to a 14–3 record, the second most wins in franchise history, with both Darnold and newly acquired running back Aaron Jones registering career highs in passing and rushing yards, respectively. However, due to a Week 18 loss to the Lions, the Vikings became the first 14-win team to settle for a Wild Card round berth, finishing second in the NFC North. During the Wild Card Round, O'Connell matched up against his former mentor Sean McVay for a second time. The Vikings lost to the Los Angeles Rams 27–9 in a game played at State Farm Stadium in Glendale, Arizona due to the wildfires in southern California. Including the postseason, all four of the 2024 Vikings' losses were against the Lions and Rams.

On January 21, 2025, O'Connell signed a contract extension with the Vikings. Two days later, he was honored by the Pro Football Writers Association as the 2024 Head Coach of the Year. On February 6, 2025, O'Connell was also honored as the AP NFL Coach of the Year. In 2025, the Vikings failed to match their last season's win total, going 4–4 for the first eight games, then having a four-game losing-skid. The Vikings finished the year with a 9–8 record, winning five straight to end the year.

== Head coaching record ==
Team	Year	Regular season					Postseason			
Team	Year	Won	Lost	Ties	Win %	Finish	Won	Lost	Win %	Result
MIN	2022	13	4	0	.765	1st in NFC North	0	1	.000	Lost to New York Giants in NFC Wild Card Game
MIN	2023	7	10	0	.412	3rd in NFC North	—	—	—	—
MIN	2024	14	3	0	.824	2nd in NFC North	0	1	.000	Lost to Los Angeles Rams in NFC Wild Card Game
MIN	2025	9	8	0	.529	3rd in NFC North	—	—	—	—
MIN	2026	7	2	0	.750	TBD in NFC North	—	—	—	—
Total		50	27	0	.649		0	2	.000	

== Personal life ==
O'Connell and his wife, Leah, have four children. He is a parishioner at Our Lady of Grace Catholic Church in Edina, Minnesota. O'Connell has spoken about "hope and faith" as important things relating to leadership in the NFL, and how his faith in Christ has "defined everything" about how he deals with adversity.
