= 2006 San Diego State Aztecs football team =

American college football season

2006 San Diego State Aztecs football
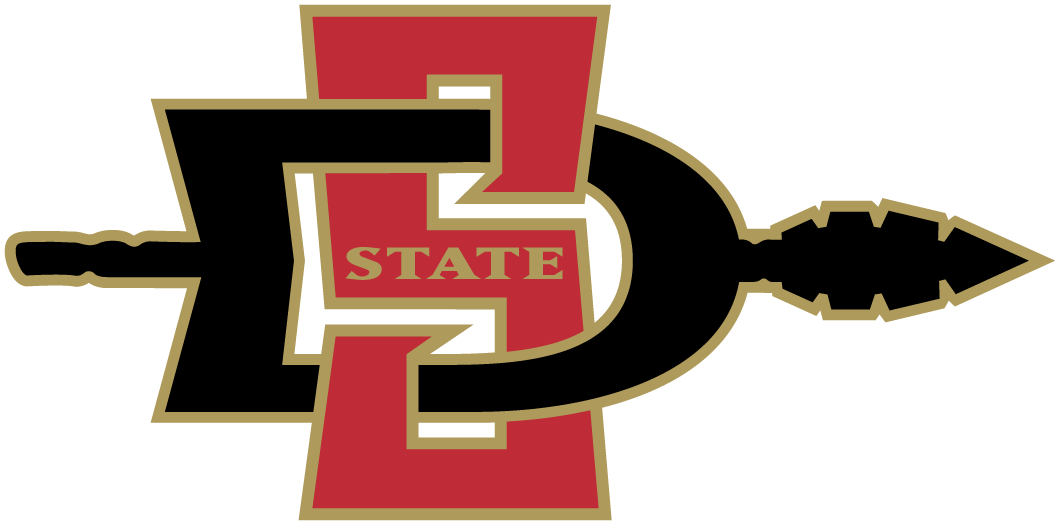
- Conference: Mountain West Conference
- Record: 3–9 (3–5 MW)
- Head coach: Chuck Long (1st season)
- Offensive coordinator: Del Miller (1st season)
- Offensive scheme: Pro-style
- Defensive coordinator: Bob Elliott (1st season)
- Base defense: 4–3
- Home stadium: Qualcomm Stadium

2006 Mountain West Conference football standings
	Conf.			Overall
Team	W		L	W		L
No. 16 BYU $	8	–	0	11	–	2
No. 22 TCU	6	–	2	11	–	2
Utah	5	–	3	8	–	5
Wyoming	5	–	3	6	–	6
New Mexico	4	–	4	6	–	7
Air Force	3	–	5	4	–	8
San Diego State	3	–	5	3	–	9
Colorado State	1	–	7	4	–	8
UNLV	1	–	7	2	–	10
$ – Conference champion; Rankings from AP Poll

The 2006 San Diego State Aztecs football team represented San Diego State University in the 2006 NCAA Division I FBS football season. They were coached by Chuck Long and played their home games at Qualcomm Stadium.

== Schedule ==
Date	Time	Opponent	Site	TV	Result	Attendance	Source
August 31	7:30 pm	UTEP*	Qualcomm Stadium; San Diego, CA	CSTV	L 27–34	34,723	
September 6	12:30 pm	at Wisconsin*	Camp Randall Stadium; Madison, WI	ESPN Plus	L 0–14	81,090	
September 23	5:00 pm	Utah	Qualcomm Stadium; San Diego, CA	mtn.	L 7–38	53,794	
September 30	3:00 pm	at San Jose State*	Spartan Stadium; San Jose, CA	4SD	L 10–31	14,361	
October 7	11:00 am	at BYU	LaVell Edwards Stadium; Provo, UT	mtn.	L 17–47	60,804	
October 21	5:00 pm	Air Force	Qualcomm Stadium; San Diego, CA	mtn.	W 19–12	26,871	
October 28	5:00 pm	Cal Poly*	Qualcomm Stadium; San Diego, CA		L 14–16	20,974	
November 4	12:00 pm	at Wyoming	War Memorial Stadium; Laramie, WY	mtn.	L 24–27	14,012	
November 11	6:00 pm	UNLV	Qualcomm Stadium; San Diego, CA	mtn	W 21–7	21,445	
November 18	1:00 pm	at TCU	Amon G. Carter Stadium; Fort Worth, TX	Versus	L 0–52	26,287	
November 25	11:30 am	at New Mexico	University Stadium; Albuquerque, NM		L 14–41	23,421	
December 2	5:00 pm	Colorado State	Qualcomm Stadium; San Diego, CA	mtn.	W 17–6	17,557	
*Non-conference game; All times are in Pacific time

== Roster ==
2006 San Diego State Aztecs football team roster
Players
Coaches
Offense

Pos.	#	Name	Class
WR	1	Chaz Schilens	Jr
QB	3	Kevin Craft	Fr
QB	4	Darren Mougey	So
QB	7	Kevin O'Connell	Jr
WR	16	Brett Swain	Jr
WR	18	Roberto Wallace	Fr
WR	19	DeMarco Sampson	So
RB	22	Lynell Hamilton	Jr
OT	62	Brandyn Dombrowski	Jr
TE	81	Steve Schmidt	Sr
TE	89	Lance Louis	Jr

Defense

Pos.	#	Name	Class
CB	9	Terrell Maze	Sr
LB	46	Russell Allen	So
LB	51	Joe Martin	Sr
DE	93	Antwan Applewhite	Jr
DE	94	Nick Osborn	Jr

Special teams

Pos.	#	Name	Class
LS	52	Tyler Schmitt	Jr

Head coach

- Chuck Long

Coordinators/assistant coaches

- Joe Bob Clements – Defensive line
- Bob Elliott – Assistant Head Coach / Defensive coordinator
- William Inge – Linebackers
- Jonathan Himebauch – Offensive line'
- Larry Holton – Running backs
- Thom Kaumeyer – Defensive backs
- LeCharls McDaniel – Wide receivers
- Del Miller – Offensive coordinator / quarterbacks
- Toby Neinas – Tight ends
- Brian Stark – Offensive assistant

Legend

- (C) Team captain
- (S) Suspended
- (I) Ineligible
- Injured
- Redshirt
