= 2006 BYU Cougars football team =

American college football season

2006 BYU Cougars football

Mountain West champion Las Vegas Bowl champion

Las Vegas Bowl, W 38–8 vs. Oregon
- Conference: Mountain West Conference

Ranking
- Coaches: No. 15
- AP: No. 16
- Record: 11–2 (8–0 MW)
- Head coach: Bronco Mendenhall (2nd season)
- Offensive coordinator: Robert Anae (2nd season)
- Offensive scheme: Air Raid
- Base defense: 3–4
- Home stadium: LaVell Edwards Stadium (Capacity: 64,045)

2006 Mountain West Conference football standings
	Conf.			Overall
Team	W		L	W		L
No. 16 BYU $	8	–	0	11	–	2
No. 22 TCU	6	–	2	11	–	2
Utah	5	–	3	8	–	5
Wyoming	5	–	3	6	–	6
New Mexico	4	–	4	6	–	7
Air Force	3	–	5	4	–	8
San Diego State	3	–	5	3	–	9
Colorado State	1	–	7	4	–	8
UNLV	1	–	7	2	–	10
$ – Conference champion; Rankings from AP Poll

The 2006 BYU Cougars football team represented Brigham Young University in the 2006 NCAA Division I FBS football season. The Cougars won the Mountain West Conference (MWC) championship outright with an 11–2 record (8–0 in the MWC), their first unbeaten conference play since 2001. This was also BYU's third season with at least a share of the MWC title (co-champions with CSU and Utah in 1999, and sole champions in 2001). The Cougars played their home games at LaVell Edwards Stadium, named after its legendary coach, LaVell Edwards.

== Pre-season ==
Among the returning starters were quarterback John Beck, running back Curtis Brown, linebacker Cameron Jenson and tight end Jonny Harline.

== During the season ==
The Cougars started the season unranked in either the Coaches Poll or the AP Poll, and would not enter the polls until they had won their eighth game. They steadily rose in the rankings mainly on the strength of an offense that finished the regular season 5th in the nation in scoring and 4th in passing yards of 323.5 per game. The key to their offense was quarterback John Beck, who was one of the nation's top quarterbacks, running back Curtis Brown, and tight end Jonny Harline. They averaged a 465.5 yards and 36.8 points per game.

The Cougars played five bowl-bound teams during the season—Boston College, their second opponent from one of the six BCS conferences; Tulsa; TCU; the New Mexico; and their conference rivals, the Utah Utes. Notably, BYU defeated TCU (then ranked #15) by 31-17 putting an end to the Horned Frogs' 13-game winning streak.

=== Postseason awards and citations ===
John Beck

- MWC Offensive Player of the Week for seven weeks
- Mountain West Conference Offensive Player of the Year (unanimous)
- Johnny Unitas Golden Arm Award Finalist
- Davey O'Brien Award Semifinalist
- Heisman candidate
- Walter Camp National Offensive Player of the Week
- First Team All-Mountain West Conference (unanimous)
- Second Team All-America, The Sporting News
  - Honorable Mention All-America, CBSSportsline.com, Pro Football Weekly, College Football News

Jonny Harline

- Mackey Award semifinalist
- First Team All-America, The Sporting News, ESPN, College Football News, CBSSportsline.com, SI.com
  - Third Team All-America, Associated Press

Jake Kuresa

- Second Team All-America, College Football News
  - Honorable Mention All-America, The Sporting News
- First Team All-Mountain West Conference

Bronco Mendenhall

- AFCA Region 5 Coach of the Year

Curtis Brown

- First Team All-Mountain West Conference

Sete Aulai

- Second Team All-Mountain West Conference

Cameron Jensen

- First Team All-Mountain West Conference (unanimous)
- Mountain West Conference Defensive Player of the Week

Quinn Gooch

- Second Team All-Mountain West Conference

Bryan Kehl

- Honorable Mention All-Mountain West Conference

Jared McLaughlin

- Second Team All-Mountain West Conference

Nate Meikle

- Second Team All-Mountain West Conference
- Academic All-District
- National Scholar-Athlete Candidate

== Schedule ==
Date	Time	Opponent	Rank	Site	TV	Result	Attendance
September 2	7:15 p.m.	at Arizona*		Arizona Stadium; Tucson, AZ	TBS	L 13–16	58,450
September 9	2:00 p.m.	Tulsa*		LaVell Edwards Stadium; Provo, UT	mtn	W 49–24	56,627
September 16	10:00 a.m.	at No. 23 Boston College*		Alumni Stadium; Chestnut Hill, MA	ESPN2	L 23–30 ^{2OT}	40,233
September 23	1:00 p.m.	Utah State*		LaVell Edwards Stadium; Provo, UT (Beehive Boot & The Old Wagon Wheel)	mtn	W 38–0	58,659
September 28	4:00 p.m.	at No. 17 TCU		Amon G. Carter Stadium; Fort Worth, TX	Versus	W 31–17	32,190
October 7	11:00 a.m.	San Diego State		LaVell Edwards Stadium; Provo, UT	mtn	W 47–17	60,804
October 21	2:30 p.m.	UNLV^{†}		LaVell Edwards Stadium; Provo, UT	mtn	W 52–7	63,341
October 28	12:00 p.m.	at Air Force		Falcon Stadium; Colorado Springs, CO	Versus	W 33–14	35,521
November 4	4:30 p.m.	at Colorado State		Hughes Stadium; Fort Collins, CO	mtn	W 24–3	21,117
November 9	6:00 p.m.	Wyoming	No. 25	LaVell Edwards Stadium; Provo, UT	CSTV	W 55–7	59,901
November 18	2:00 p.m.	New Mexico	No. 23	LaVell Edwards Stadium; Provo, UT	mtn	W 42–17	63,814
November 25	1:30 p.m.	at Utah	No. 21	Rice-Eccles Stadium; Salt Lake City, UT (Beehive Boot & Holy War)	CSTV/mtn	W 33–31	45,330
December 21	6:00 p.m.	vs. Oregon*	No. 19	Sam Boyd Stadium; Las Vegas, NV (Las Vegas Bowl)	ESPN2	W 38–8	44,615
*Non-conference game; ^{†}Homecoming; Rankings from AP Poll released prior to the game; All times are in Mountain time

== Rankings ==
Ranking movements Legend: ██ Increase in ranking ██ Decrease in ranking — = Not ranked RV = Received votes
	Week															
Poll	Pre	1	2	3	4	5	6	7	8	9	10	11	12	13	14	Final
AP	RV	—	—	—	—	—	RV	RV	RV	RV	25	23	21	20	19	16
Coaches Poll	RV	—	—	—	—	RV	RV	RV	RV	RV	RV	24	23	21	20	15
Harris	Not released				—	RV	RV	RV	RV	RV	RV	24	21	19	19	Not released
BCS	Not released							—	—	—	—	25	23	21	20	Not released

== Roster ==
(as of September 2006)
Wide receivers: 2 Bryce Mahuika - Sophomore; 3 Michael Reed^{†} - Sophomore; 5 Brett Cooper - Senior; 9 Nathan Meikle^{†} - Senior; 10 Matt Allen^{†} - Junior; 19 Zac Erekson - Sophomore; 80 McKay Jacobson - Freshman; 82 Ryan Neeley - Junior; 83 Saia Hafoka - Sophomore; 85 Zac Collie - Senior; 86 Daniel Tervort - Freshman; 87 Matt Smith - Senior; Offensive guards: 62 Braden Hansen - Freshman; 74 Travis Bright^{†} - Sophomore; 76 Ray Feinga^{†} - Sophomore; Offensive tackles: 65 Dallas Reynolds^{†} - Sophomore; 66 Garrett Reden - Freshman; 68 David Oswald - Sophomore; 73 Jake Kuresa^{†} - Senior; Centers: 60 Ryan Freeman - Freshman; 67 Sete Aulai^{†} - Junior; Offensive linemen: 53 Tom Sorensen - Sophomore; 55 Jeff Rhea - Junior; 59 Eddie Keele - Senior; 61 Jackson Smith - Freshman; 69 John Barrett - Freshman; 71 Rick Wolfley - Freshman; 72 Nick Longshore - Senior; 75 Walter Kahaialii -Freshman; 77 Jason Speredon - Freshman; 79 Erik Freeman - Junior; 58 Jayson Clark - Senior	Tight ends: 13 Jonny Harline^{†} - Senior; 20 Daniel Coats - Senior; 37 Vic So'oto - Sophomore; 84 Jeff Allen - Freshman; 88 Andrew George - Freshman; 89 Brock Hansen - Freshman; Fullbacks: 11 Manase Tonga^{†} - Sophomore; 27 Joe Semanoff - Junior; Quarterbacks: 4 James Lark - Freshman; 7 Jason Beck - Senior; 11 Sam Doman - Freshman; 12 John Beck^{†} - Senior; 16 Jacob Bower - Freshman; 24 Kurt McEuen - Freshman; Running backs: 1 Fui Vakapuna - Sophomore; 6 Curtis Brown^{†} - Senior; 22 Ray Hudson - Sophomore; 31 Isaac Taylor - Sophomore; 32 Mike Hague - Freshman; 45 Harvey Unga - Freshman; Defensive line: 54 Kyle Luekenga - Sophomore; 57 Dan Alleto - Freshman; 75 Jordan Richardson - Freshman; 77 Ian Dulan - Freshman; 90 Mosese Foketi - Junior; 92 Brett Denney - Freshman; 93 Sean Sullivan - Junior; 94 Tommy Nelson - Freshman; 95 Temana Paongo - Freshman; 96 Kalama Kaluhiokalani - Freshman; 97 Garrett Eskelsen - Freshman; Defensive ends: 70 Hala Paongo^{†} - Senior; 84 Jan Jorgensen^{†} - Freshman; 91 Judd Anderton - Junior; 99 Matangi Tonga - Freshman; Defensive tackles: 51 Russell Tialavea^{†} - Freshman; 98 Romney Fuga - Freshman	Defensive backs: 4 Brandon Howard - Freshman; 6 Jordan Stephan - Freshman; 10 Jeff Sorensen - Freshman; 14 Tyler Kozlowski - Freshman; 16 Kellen Fowler - Junior; 18 Aaron Attig - Freshman; 19 Brandon Bradley - Freshman; 20 Michael Moore - Freshman; 22 Carter Mees - Freshman; 24 Nate Hutchinson - Freshman; 26 Aaron Gordon - Senior; 29 Kelly Bills - Sophomore; 30 Robbie Buckner - Freshman; 31 Chris Warner - Sophomore; 32 Scott Johnson - Sophomore; 39 Cole Miyahira - Senior; Linebackers: 35 Cameron Jensen^{†} - Senior; 36 Markell Staffieri - Junior; 41 Bryan Kehl^{†} - Junior; 42 Gary Lovely - Senior; 43 David Nixon - Sophomore; 44 Dan Van Sweden - Freshman; 45 Rex Doman - Junior; 45 Zed Mendenhall - Freshman; 46 Kelly Poppinga - Junior; 47 Terrance Hooks - Freshman; 48 Andrew Stacey - Senior; 49 Shawn Doman - Freshman; 50 Chris Bolden - Junior; 52 Aaron Wagner - Senior; 53 Austin Nielsen - Freshman; 55 Skyler Stephens - Sophomore; 56 Dan Bates - Senior; 58 Jeff Bell - Freshman; 63 Connell Hess - Freshman; 76 Graeme Girdler- Freshman; Cornerbacks: 15 Justin Robinson^{†} - Senior; 21 Ben Criddle^{†} - Junior; 33 Andre Saulsberry - Junior; 34 Kayle Buchanan^{†} - Junior; Safeties: 25 Quinn Gooch^{†} - Junior; 23 David Tafuna - Junior; 28 Dustin Gabriel^{†} - Junior; Punters: 29 Derek McLaughlin^{†} - Senior; 30 Jared McLaughlin - Senior; Kickers: 30 Jared McLaughlin^{†} - Senior; 29 Derek McLaughlin - Senior; 38 Spencer Covert- Freshman
† Starter at position * Injured

== Regular season ==
=== Arizona ===
Team	1	2	3	4	Total
BYU	7	0	3	3	13
• Arizona	3	3	7	3	16

- Date: Saturday, September 2
- Location: Arizona Stadium, Tucson, Arizona
- Game start: 7:28 p.m. PST
- Elapsed time: 3:22
- Game attendance: 58,450
- Game weather: 90 °F (32 °C), partly cloudy, wind 17 mph (27 km/h) various
- Referee: Larry Farina
- TV announcers (TBS): Chip Caray, Tom Ramsey, David Aldridge

Scoring summary
1	11:52	UA	Nick Folk 30-yard field goal	UA 3-0
1	2:06	BYU	Daniel Coats 5-yard pass from John Beck (Jared McLaughlin kick)	BYU 7-3
2	12:53	UA	Nick Folk 22-yard field goal	BYU 7-6
3	10:08	BYU	Jared McLaughlin 20-yard field goal	BYU 10-6
3	6:52	UA	Anthony Johnson 2-yard pass from Willie Tuitama (Nick Folk kick)	UA 13-10
4	5:23	BYU	Jared McLaughlin 31-yard field goal	TIED 13-13
4	0:01	UA	Nick Folk 48-yard field goal	UA 16-13

=== Tulsa ===
Team	1	2	3	4	Total
Tulsa	0	10	7	7	24
• BYU	7	14	14	14	49

- Date: September 9
- Location: LaVell Edwards Stadium, Provo, UT
- Game start: 2:06 p.m. MST
- Elapsed time: 4:04
- Game attendance: 56,627
- Game weather: 77 °F (25 °C), partly cloudy and warm, wind NW 5 mph (8.0 km/h), 53 minute rain/lightning delay
- Referee: Steve Barth
- TV announcers (mtn., BYU SN): James Bates, Todd Christensen, Toby Christensen (mtn.)
  Chris Twitty, Gary Sheide (BYU SN)

Scoring summary
1	10:04	BYU	Fui Vakapuna 7-yard run (Jared McLaughlin kick)	BYU 7-0
2	11:03	TU	Kyle Grooms 6-yard pass from Paul Smith (Jarod Tracy kick)	TIED 7-7
2	8:16	TU	Jarod Tracy 25-yard field goal	TU 10-7
2	3:51	BYU	Manase Tonga 6-yard run (Jared McLaughlin kick)	BYU 14-10
2	0:47	BYU	Matt Allen 6-yard pass from John Beck (Jared McLaughlin kick)	BYU 21-10
3	13:52	BYU	Curtis Brown 62-yard pass from John Beck (Jared McLaughlin kick)	BYU 28-10
3	9:56	TU	Tarrion Adams 1-yard run (Jarod Tracy kick)	BYU 28-17
3	0:21	BYU	Fui Vakapuna 11-yard run (Jared McLaughlin kick)	BYU 35-17
4	11:36	BYU	Zac Collie 16-yard pass from John Beck (Jared McLaughlin kick)	BYU 42-17
4	9:56	BYU	Harvey Unga 6-yard run (Jared McLaughlin kick)	BYU 49-17
4	2:01	TU	Courtney Tennial 5-yard run (Jarod Tracy kick)	BYU 49-24

=== Boston College ===
Team	1	2	3	4	OT	2OT	Total
BYU	7	6	0	10	0	0	23
• #23 Boston College	6	6	8	3	0	7	30

- Date: September 16
- Location: Alumni Stadium, Chestnut Hill, MA
- Game start: 12:05 p.m. EST
- Elapsed time: 3:50
- Game attendance: 40,233
- Game weather: 75 °F (24 °C), Sunny, wind NNE 15 mph (24 km/h)
- Referee: Terry Leyden
- TV announcers (ESPN2): Sean McDonough, Chris Spielman, Rob Stone

Scoring summary
1	10:49	BYU	John Beck 1-yard run (Jared McLaughlin kick)	BYU 7-0
1	2:09	BC	Brian Toal 1-yard run (Ryan Ohliger kick failed)	BYU 7-6
2	11:15	BYU	Jared McLaughlin 45-yard field goal	BYU 10-6
2	6:35	BYU	Jared McLaughlin 50-yard field goal	BYU 13-6
2	3:22	BC	Tony Gonzales 18-yard pass from Matt Ryan (Ryan Ohliger kick failed)	BYU 13-12
3	10:27	BC	Matt Ryan 1-yard run (Kevin Challenger pass from Matt Ryan)	BC 20-13
4	14:56	BYU	Fui Vakapuna 5-yard pass from John Beck (Jared McLaughlin kick)	TIED 20-20
4	10:07	BC	Ryan Ohliger 20-yard field goal	BC 23-20
4	6:33	BYU	Jared McLaughlin 25-yard field goal	TIED 23-23
2OT		BC	Tony Gonzales 25-yard pass from Matt Ryan (Ryan Ohliger kick)	BC 30-23

=== Utah State ===
Team	1	2	3	4	Total
Utah State	0	0	0	0	0
• BYU	10	14	7	7	38

- Date: September 23
- Location: LaVell Edwards Stadium, Provo, UT
- Game start: 1:06 p.m. MST
- Elapsed time: 2:49
- Game attendance: 58,659
- Game weather: 54 °F (12 °C), partly cloudy, wind S 7 mph (11 km/h)
- Referee: Bill Athan
- TV announcers (mtn., BYU SN): James Bates, Todd Christensen, Anne Marie Anderson (mtn.)
  Chris Twitty, Gary Sheide (BYU SN)

Scoring summary
1	10:22	BYU	Fui Vakapuna 6-yard run (Jared McLaughlin kick)	BYU 7-0
1	4:53	BYU	Jared McLaughlin 44-yard field goal	BYU 10-0
2	14:02	BYU	Fui Vakapuna 11-yard run (Jared McLaughlin kick)	BYU 17-0
2	5:24	BYU	Fui Vakapuna 8-yard run (Jared McLaughlin kick)	BYU 24-0
3	8:21	BYU	Justin Robinson 64-yard Interception return (Jared McLaughlin kick)	BYU 31-0
4	2:16	BYU	Jonny Harline 18-yard pass from John Beck (Jared McLaughlin kick)	BYU 38-0

=== TCU ===
Team	1	2	3	4	Total
• BYU	3	7	7	14	31
#15 TCU	0	3	7	7	17

- Date: September 28
- Location: Amon G. Carter Stadium, Ft. Worth, TX
- Game start: 6:06 p.m. CST
- Elapsed time: 3:08
- Game attendance: 32,190
- Game weather: 77 °F (25 °C), clear skies, wind NNE 12 mph (19 km/h)
- Referee: Scott Novak
- TV announcers (VS.): Gary Bender, Glenn Parker, Argy Stathapolous

Scoring summary
1	3:40	BYU	Jared McLaughlin 31-yard field goal	BYU 3-0
2	10:03	BYU	Manase Tonga 8-yard run (Jared McLaughlin kick)	BYU 10-0
2	0:04	TCU	Chris Manfredini 36-yard field goal	BYU 10-3
3	10:26	BYU	Michael Reed 40-yard pass from John Beck (Jared McLaughlin kick	BYU 17-3
3	6:04	TCU	Brent Hecht 2-yard pass from Jeff Ballard (Chris Manfredini kick)	BYU 17-10
4	12:33	BYU	Matt Allen 26-yard pass from John Beck (Jared McLaughlin kick)	BYU 24-10
4	7:27	BYU	Jonny Harline 4-yard pass from John Beck (Jared McLaughlin kick)	BYU 31-10
4	1:55	TCU	Aaron Brown 7-yard run (Chris Manfredini kick)	BYU 31-17

=== San Diego State ===
Team	1	2	3	4	Total
San Diego State	3	0	14	0	17
• BYU	20	20	7	0	47

- Date: October 7
- Location: LaVell Edwards Stadium, Provo, UT
- Game start: 12:06 p.m. MST
- Elapsed time: 2:57
- Game attendance: 60,804
- Game weather: 54 °F (12 °C), cloudy, wind S 3 mph (4.8 km/h)
- Referee: Rich Kollen
- TV announcers (mtn., BYU SN): James Bates, Todd Christensen, Blaine Fowler (mtn.)
  Chris Twitty, Gary Sheide (BYU SN)

Scoring summary
1	13:19	BYU	Fui Vakapuna 14-yard run (Jared McLaughlin kick)	BYU 7-0
1	10:12	SDSU	Garrett Palmer 48-yard field goal	BYU 7-3
1	6:47	BYU	Zac Collie 29-yard pass from John Beck (Jared McLaughlin kick)	BYU 14-3
1	2:38	BYU	Curtis Brown 4-yard run (kick blocked)	BYU 20-3
2	10:06	BYU	Jonny Harline 8-yard pass from John Beck (kick failed)	BYU 26-3
2	8:13	BYU	Dustin Gabriel 38-yard interception return (Jared McLaughlin kick)	BYU 33-3
2	3:03	BYU	Curtis Brown 4-yard pass from John Beck (Jared McLaughlin kick)	BYU 40-3
3	12:20	SDSU	Brandon Bornes 1-yard run (Garrett Palmer kick)	BYU 40-10
3	9:41	BYU	Manase Tonga 18-yard pass from John Beck (Jared McLaughlin kick)	BYU 47-10
3	4:35	SDSU	Tyler Campbell 1-yard run (Garrett Palmer kick)	BYU 47-17

=== UNLV ===
Team	1	2	3	4	Total
UNLV	0	7	0	0	7
• BYU	21	7	14	10	52

- Date: October 21
- Location: LaVell Edwards Stadium, Provo, UT
- Game start: 1:06 p.m. MST
- Elapsed time: 3:15
- Game attendance: 63,341
- Game weather: 45 °F (7 °C), partly cloudy, wind WNW 6 mph (9.7 km/h)
- Referee: Gerald Wright
- TV announcers (mtn., BYU SN): James Bates, Todd Christensen, Blaine Fowler (mtn.)
  Chris Twitty, Gary Sheide (BYU SN)

Scoring summary
1	12:29	BYU	Jonny Harline 48-yard pass from John Beck (Jared McLaughlin kick)	BYU 7-0
1	5:32	BYU	John Beck 1-yard run (Jared McLaughlin kick)	BYU 14-0
1	3:50	BYU	Curtis Brown 1-yard run (Jared McLaughlin kick)	BYU 21-0
2	7:48	UNLV	Casey Flair 3-yard pass from Rocky Hinds (Sergio Aguayo kick)	BYU 21-7
2	2:48	BYU	McKay Jacobson 28-yard pass from John Beck (Jared McLaughlin kick)	BYU 28-7
3	5:08	BYU	Jonny Harline 5-yard pass from John Beck (Jared McLaughlin kick)	BYU 35-7
3	0:40	BYU	McKay Jacobson 20-yard pass from John Beck (Jared McLaughlin kick)	BYU 42-7
4	8:12	BYU	Jared McLaughlin 34-yard field goal	BYU 45-7
4	3:21	BYU	Mike Hague 81-yard run (Jared McLaughlin kick)	BYU 52-7

=== Air Force ===
Team	1	2	3	4	Total
• BYU	7	14	3	9	33
Air Force	0	0	7	7	14

- Date: October 28
- Location: Falcon Stadium, Air Force Academy, CO
- Game start: 12:06 p.m. MST
- Elapsed time: 2:56
- Game attendance: 35,521
- Game weather: 62 °F (17 °C), mostly sunny, wind SE 10 mph (16 km/h)
- Referee: Rich Kollen
- TV announcers (VS.): Gary Bender, Glenn Parker, Argy Stathapolous

Scoring summary
1	7:53	BYU	Fui Vakapuna 6-yard run (Jared McLaughlin kick)	BYU 7-0
2	10:12	BYU	Michael Reed 8-yard pass from John Beck (Jared McLaughlin kick)	BYU 14-0
2	0:58	BYU	Jonny Harline 1-yard pass from John Beck (Jared McLaughlin kick)	BYU 21-0
3	11:08	BYU	Jared McLaughlin 53-yard field goal	BYU 24-0
3	3:54	AFA	Shaun Karney 1-yard run (Zach Sasser kick)	BYU 24-7
4	13:40	BYU	Fui Vakapuna 4-yard pass from John Beck (kick blocked)	BYU 30-7
4	6:38	BYU	Jared McLaughlin 27-yard field goal	BYU 33-7
4	0:27	AFA	Beau Suder 3-yard run (Zach Sasser kick)	BYU 33-14

=== Colorado State ===
Team	1	2	3	4	Total
• BYU	7	7	7	3	24
Colorado State	0	3	0	0	3

- Date: November 4
- Location: Hughes Stadium, Fort Collins, CO
- Game start: 4:36 p.m. MST
- Elapsed time: 2:38
- Game attendance: 21,117
- Game weather: 50 °F (10 °C), partly cloudy, wind SW 5 mph (8.0 km/h)
- Referee: Terry Leyden
- TV announcers (mtn.): James Bates, Todd Christensen, Anne Marie Anderson

Scoring summary
1	6:43	BYU	Manase Tonga 3-yard run (Jared McLaughlin kick)	BYU 7-0
2	8:18	CSU	Jason Smith 28-yard field goal	BYU 7-3
2	0:55	BYU	Fui Vakapuna 5-yard run (Jared McLaughlin kick)	BYU 14-3
3	0:22	BYU	Fui Vakapuna 3-yard run (Jared McLaughlin kick)	BYU 21-3
4	7:35	BYU	Jared McLaughlin 25-yard field goal	BYU 24-3

=== Wyoming ===
Team	1	2	3	4	Total
Wyoming	0	0	0	7	7
• #25 BYU	21	10	10	14	55

- Date: November 9
- Location: LaVell Edwards Stadium, Provo, UT
- Game start: 6:06 p.m. MST
- Elapsed time: 2:50
- Game attendance: 59,901
- Game weather: 38 °F (3 °C), overcast, wind N 4 mph (6.4 km/h)
- Referee: Scott Novak
- TV announcers (CSTV, BYU SN): Jonathan Coachman, Chris Rix (CSTV)
  Chris Twitty, Gary Sheide (BYU SN)

Scoring summary
1	13:03	BYU	Curtis Brown 1-yard run (Jared McLaughlin kick) (Jared McLaughlin kick)	BYU 7-0
1	7:53	BYU	Jonny Harline 6-yard pass from John Beck (Jared McLaughlin kick)	BYU 14-0
1	4:35	BYU	Michael Reed 33-yard pass from John Beck (Jared McLaughlin kick)	BYU 21-0
2	6:38	BYU	Curtis Brown 1-yard run (Jared McLaughlin kick)	BYU 28-0
2	0:31	BYU	Jared McLaughlin 31-yard field goal	BYU 31-0
3	12:12	BYU	John Beck 1-yard run (Jared McLaughlin kick)	BYU 38-0
3	2:58	BYU	Jared McLaughlin 18-yard field goal	BYU 41-0
4	9:30	BYU	John Beck 1-yard run (Jared McLaughlin kick)	BYU 48-0
4	7:44	BYU	McKay Jacobson 77-yard punt return (Jared McLaughlin kick)	BYU 55-0
4	6:25	WY	Devin Moore 71-yard run (Jake Scott kick)	BYU 55-7

=== New Mexico ===
Team	1	2	3	4	Total
New Mexico	3	0	14	0	17
• #23 BYU	14	14	7	7	42

- Date: November 18
- Location: LaVell Edwards Stadium, Provo, UT
- Game start: 2:07 p.m. MST
- Elapsed time: 3:02
- Game attendance: 63,814
- Game weather: 55 °F (13 °C), partly cloudy, no wind
- Referee: Karl Richins
- TV announcers (mtn., BYU SN): Rich Cellini, Jon Berger, Blaine Fowler (mtn.)
  Chris Twitty, Gary Sheide (BYU SN)

Scoring summary
1	12:53	BYU	Curtis Brown 49-yard run (Jared McLaughlin kick)	BYU 7-0
1	7:51	BYU	McKay Jacobson 20-yard pass from John Beck (Jared McLaughlin kick)	BYU 14-0
1	3:01	UNM	Kenny Byrd 31-yard field goal	BYU 14-3
2	13:26	BYU	Jonny Harline 71-yard pass from John Beck (Jared McLaughlin kick)	BYU 21-3
2	1:02	BYU	Curtis Brown 9-yard pass from John Beck (Jared McLaughlin kick)	BYU 28-3
3	13:51	UNM	Travis Brown 35-yard pass from Chris Nelson (Kenny Byrd kick)	BYU 28-10
3	8:56	UNM	Quincy Black 88-yard interception return (Kenny Byrd kick)	BYU 28-17
3	4:58	BYU	Matt Allen 4-yard pass from John Beck (Jared McLaughlin kick)	BYU 35-17
4	4:53	BYU	John Beck 1-yard run (Jared McLaughlin kick)	BYU 42-17

=== Utah ===
Team	1	2	3	4	Total
• #21 BYU	14	0	0	19	33
Utah	0	10	14	7	31

- Date: November 25
- Location: Rice-Eccles Stadium, Salt Lake City, UT
- Game start: 1:38 p.m. MST
- Elapsed time: 3:18
- Game attendance: 45,330
- Game weather: 42 °F (6 °C), mostly sunny, wind SW 4 mph (6.4 km/h)
- Referee: Rich Kollen
- TV announcers (mtn., CSTV): James Bates, Todd Christensen, Blaine Fowler

Scoring summary
1	10:38	BYU	Manase Tonga 1-yard run (Jared McLaughlin kick)	BYU 7-0
1	6:48	BYU	Jonny Harline 36-yard pass from John Beck (Jared McLaughlin kick)	BYU 14-0
2	9:18	UTAH	Brent Casteel 18-yard pass from Eric Weddle (Louie Sakoda kick)	BYU 14-7
2	0:00	UTAH	Louie Sakoda 24-yard field goal	BYU 14-10
3	8:24	UTAH	Marquis Wilson 57-yard pass from Brett Ratliff (Louie Sakoda kick)	UTAH 17-14
3	1:41	UTAH	Colt Sampson 4-yard pass from Brett Ratliff (Louie Sakoda kick)	UTAH 24-14
4	13:15	BYU	Jonny Harline 4-yard pass from John Beck (kick blocked)	UTAH 24-20
4	3:23	BYU	Daniel Coats 2-yard pass from John Beck (Jared McLaughlin kick)	BYU 27-24
4	1:19	UTAH	Brent Casteel 19-yard pass from Brett Ratliff (Louie Sakoda kick)	UTAH 31-27
4	0:00	BYU	Jonny Harline 11-yard pass from John Beck (run failed)	BYU 33-31

- Announcer James Bates: "Five in a row won't happen." Referring to Utah winning the past four years in the rivalry series.

=== Las Vegas Bowl ===
Las Vegas Bowl

Team	1	2	3	4	Total
• #19 BYU	0	17	7	14	38
Oregon	0	0	0	8	8

- Date: December 21
- Location: Sam Boyd Stadium, Las Vegas, NV
- Game start: 5:01 p.m. PST
- Elapsed time: 3:28
- Game attendance: 44,615
- Game weather: 46 °F (8 °C), partly cloudy, wind 2 mph (3.2 km/h)
- Referee: Nick Define
- TV announcers (ESPN/Sports USA): Brent Musburger, Bob Davie, Lisa Salters (ESPN)
  Tom Dillon, John Robinson (Sports USA)

Scoring summary
2	13:25	BYU	Jared McLaughlin 24-yard field goal	BYU 3-0
2	6:57	BYU	Curtis Brown 6-yard run (Jared McLaughlin kick)	BYU 10-0
2	1:50	BYU	Jonny Harline 41-yard pass from John Beck (Jared McLaughlin kick)	BYU 17-0
3	3:42	BYU	Curtis Brown 4-yard run (Jared McLaughlin kick)	BYU 24-0
4	11:29	BYU	John Beck 13-yard run (Jared McLaughlin kick)	BYU 31-0
4	10:27	ORE	Brian Paysinger 47-yard pass from Dennis Dixon (Jeremiah Johnson run)	BYU 31-8
4	9:14	BYU	Manase Tonga 17-yard pass from John Beck (Jared McLaughlin kick)	BYU 38-8

- "Um, remind me again who's in the Mountain West Conference." - Mike Bellotti on BYU's undefeated conference record
- "Collectively, no, they couldn't compete at the highest level in the Pac-10. They lost to Arizona this year. They wouldn't even be a midlevel Pac-10 team." - Bellotti on BYU as Pac-10 team
- BYU first bowl win since 1996 season
