= 2006 UNLV Rebels football team =

American college football season

2006 UNLV Rebels football
- Conference: Mountain West Conference
- Record: 2–10 (1–7 MW)
- Head coach: Mike Sanford Sr. (2nd season)
- Offensive coordinator: Noah Brindise (2nd season)
- Defensive coordinator: Vic Shealy (2nd season)
- Home stadium: Sam Boyd Stadium

2006 Mountain West Conference football standings
	Conf.			Overall
Team	W		L	W		L
No. 16 BYU $	8	–	0	11	–	2
No. 22 TCU	6	–	2	11	–	2
Utah	5	–	3	8	–	5
Wyoming	5	–	3	6	–	6
New Mexico	4	–	4	6	–	7
Air Force	3	–	5	4	–	8
San Diego State	3	–	5	3	–	9
Colorado State	1	–	7	4	–	8
UNLV	1	–	7	2	–	10
$ – Conference champion; Rankings from AP Poll

The 2006 UNLV Rebels football team represented the University of Nevada, Las Vegas (UNLV) as a member of the Mountain West Conference (MW) during the 2006 NCAA Division I FBS football season. Led by second-year head coach Mike Sanford Sr., the Rebels compiled an overall record of 2–10 record with mark of 1–7 in conference play, tying for eighth place at the bottom of the MW standings. The team played home games at Sam Boyd Stadium in Whitney, Nevada.

== Schedule ==
Date	Time	Opponent	Site	TV	Result	Attendance	Source
September 2	7:00 p.m.	Idaho State*	Sam Boyd Stadium; Whitney, NV		W 54–10	19,943	
September 9	4:00 p.m.	at Iowa State*	Jack Trice Stadium; Ames, IA		L 10–16	45,795	
September 16	9:00 p.m.	at Hawaii*	Aloha Stadium; Halawa, HI	ESPN Plus	L 13–42	32,008	
September 30	7:00 p.m.	Nevada*	Sam Boyd Stadium; Whitney, NV (Fremont Cannon)	mtn.	L 3–31	37,179	
October 7	2:30 p.m.	at Colorado State	Hughes Stadium; Fort Collins, CO	mtn.	L 7–28	32,841	
October 14	7:00 p.m.	New Mexico	Sam Boyd Stadium; Whitney, NV	mtn.	L 36–39 ^{OT}	16,456	
October 21	12:00 p.m.	at BYU	LaVell Edwards Stadium; Provo, UT	mtn.	L 7–52	63,341	
October 26	1:00 p.m.	at Utah	Rice–Eccles Stadium; Salt Lake City, UT	mtn.	L 23–45	42,474	
November 4	12:00 p.m.	TCU^{†}	Sam Boyd Stadium; Whitney, NV	Versus	L 10–25	13,916	
November 11	6:00 p.m.	at San Diego State	Qualcomm Stadium; San Diego, CA	mtn.	L 7–21	21,445	
November 18	1:00 p.m.	Wyoming	Sam Boyd Stadium; Whitney, NV		L 26–34	14,021	
November 24	4:00 p.m.	Air Force	Sam Boyd Stadium; Whitney, NV	mtn.	W 42–39	13,927	
*Non-conference game; ^{†}Homecoming; All times are in Pacific time
