= 2006 Utah Utes football team =

American college football season

2006 Utah Utes football

Armed Forces Bowl champion

Armed Forces Bowl, W 25–13 vs. Tulsa
- Conference: Mountain West Conference
- Record: 8–5 (5–3 MW)
- Head coach: Kyle Whittingham (2nd season)
- Offensive coordinator: Andy Ludwig (2nd season)
- Offensive scheme: Spread
- Defensive coordinator: Gary Andersen (2nd season)
- Base defense: 4–3
- Home stadium: Rice-Eccles Stadium

2006 Mountain West Conference football standings
	Conf.			Overall
Team	W		L	W		L
No. 16 BYU $	8	–	0	11	–	2
No. 22 TCU	6	–	2	11	–	2
Utah	5	–	3	8	–	5
Wyoming	5	–	3	6	–	6
New Mexico	4	–	4	6	–	7
Air Force	3	–	5	4	–	8
San Diego State	3	–	5	3	–	9
Colorado State	1	–	7	4	–	8
UNLV	1	–	7	2	–	10
$ – Conference champion; Rankings from AP Poll

The 2006 Utah Utes football team represented the University of Utah in the 2006 NCAA Division I FBS football season. The team was coached by second-year head football coach Kyle Whittingham. The Utes played their home games in Rice-Eccles Stadium.

== Schedule ==
Date	Time	Opponent	Site	TV	Result	Attendance	Source
September 2	5:00 pm	at UCLA*	Rose Bowl; Pasadena, CA	FSN	L 10–31	59,709	
September 9	6:00 pm	Northern Arizona*	Rice–Eccles Stadium; Salt Lake City, UT	mtn.	W 45–7	43,327	
September 16	6:05 pm	at Utah State*	Romney Stadium; Logan, UT (Battle of the Brothers)	KJZZ	W 48–0	20,082	
September 23	6:00 pm	at San Diego State	Qualcomm Stadium; San Diego, CA	mtn.	W 38–7	53,794	
September 30	1:00 pm	No. 22 Boise State*^{†}	Rice–Eccles Stadium; Salt Lake City, UT	Versus	L 3–36	45,222	
October 5	7:00 pm	TCU	Rice–Eccles Stadium; Salt Lake City, UT	Versus	W 20–7	43,790	
October 14	1:00 pm	at Wyoming	War Memorial Stadium; Laramie, WY	mtn.	L 15–31	20,806	
October 19	7:00 pm	at New Mexico	University Stadium; Albuquerque, NM	mtn.	L 31–34	23,471	
October 28	2:00 pm	UNLV	Rice–Eccles Stadium; Salt Lake City, UT	mtn.	W 45–23	42,474	
November 11	12:00 pm	Colorado State	Rice–Eccles Stadium; Salt Lake City, UT	Versus	W 35–22	39,532	
November 18	5:30 pm	at Air Force	Falcon Stadium; Colorado Springs, CO	mtn.	W 17–14	27,611	
November 25	1:30 pm	No. 21 BYU	Rice–Eccles Stadium; Salt Lake City, UT (Holy War)	CSTV/mtn.	L 31–33	45,330	
December 23	6:00 pm	vs. Tulsa*	Amon G. Carter Stadium; Fort Worth, TX (Armed Forces Bowl)	ESPN	W 25–13	32,412	
*Non-conference game; ^{†}Homecoming; Rankings from AP Poll released prior to the game; All times are in Mountain time

== After the season ==
=== NFL draft ===
Utah had two players taken in the 2007 NFL draft:

Player	Position	Round	Pick	NFL club
Eric Weddle	Safety	2	37	San Diego Chargers
Paul Soliai	Defensive tackle	4	108	Miami Dolphins
