= 2006 TCU Horned Frogs football team =

American college football season

2006 TCU Horned Frogs football

Poinsettia Bowl champion

Poinsettia Bowl, W 37–7 vs. Northern Illinois
- Conference: Mountain West Conference

Ranking
- Coaches: No. 21
- AP: No. 22
- Record: 11–2 (6–2 MW)
- Head coach: Gary Patterson (6th season)
- Offensive coordinator: Mike Schultz (9th season)
- Offensive scheme: Spread
- Defensive coordinator: Dick Bumpas (3rd season)
- Base defense: 4–2–5
- Home stadium: Amon G. Carter Stadium

2006 Mountain West Conference football standings
| | Conf. | | | Overall |
| Team | W | | L | W | | L |
|---|---|---|---|---|---|---|
| No. 16 BYU $ | 8 | – | 0 | 11 | – | 2 |
| No. 22 TCU | 6 | – | 2 | 11 | – | 2 |
| Utah | 5 | – | 3 | 8 | – | 5 |
| Wyoming | 5 | – | 3 | 6 | – | 6 |
| New Mexico | 4 | – | 4 | 6 | – | 7 |
| Air Force | 3 | – | 5 | 4 | – | 8 |
| San Diego State | 3 | – | 5 | 3 | – | 9 |
| Colorado State | 1 | – | 7 | 4 | – | 8 |
| UNLV | 1 | – | 7 | 2 | – | 10 |
$ – Conference champion; Rankings from AP Poll

The 2006 TCU Horned Frogs football team represented Texas Christian University in the 2006 NCAA Division I FBS football season. The team was led by head coach Gary Patterson and played their home games at Amon G. Carter Stadium in Fort Worth, Texas. TCU finished the season with an overall record of 11–2 with a 6–2 mark in the Mountain West Conference, where they placed second behind BYU. The Horned Frogs were invited to the Poinsettia Bowl, where they defeated Northern Illinois, 37–7.

== Schedule ==
| Date | Time | Opponent | Rank | Site | TV | Result | Attendance |
|---|---|---|---|---|---|---|---|
| September 3 | 5:30 p.m. | at Baylor* | No. 22 | Floyd Casey Stadium; Waco, TX (rivalry) | FSN | W 17–7 | 42,733 |
| September 9 | 6:00 p.m. | No. 19 (FCS) UC Davis* | No. 23 | Amon G. Carter Stadium; Fort Worth, TX | | W 46–13 | 25,272 |
| September 16 | 4:30 p.m. | No. 24 Texas Tech* | No. 20 | Amon G. Carter Stadium; Fort Worth, TX (rivalry) | Versus | W 12–3 | 45,647 |
| September 28 | 5:00 p.m. | BYU | No. 17 | Amon G. Carter Stadium; Fort Worth, TX | Versus | L 17–31 | 32,190 |
| October 5 | 8:00 p.m. | at Utah | | Rice-Eccles Stadium; Salt Lake City, UT | Versus | L 7–20 | 43,790 |
| October 21 | 2:30 p.m. | at Army* | | Michie Stadium; West Point, NY | ESPNU | W 31–17 | 33,614 |
| October 28 | 2:30 p.m. | Wyoming^{†} | | Amon G. Carter Stadium; Fort Worth, TX | MTN | W 26–3 | 31,394 |
| November 4 | 2:00 p.m. | at UNLV | | Sam Boyd Stadium; Whitney, NV | Versus | W 25–10 | 13,916 |
| November 11 | 4:30 p.m. | at New Mexico | | University Stadium; Albuquerque, NM | MTN | W 27–21 | 32,754 |
| November 18 | 3:00 p.m. | San Diego State | | Amon G. Carter Stadium; Fort Worth, TX | Versus | W 52–0 | 26,287 |
| November 25 | 6:00 p.m. | at Colorado State | | Hughes Stadium; Fort Collins, CO | MTN | W 45–14 | 16,146 |
| December 2 | 2:30 p.m. | Air Force | | Amon G. Carter Stadium; Fort Worth, TX | CSTV | W 38–14 | 30,767 |
| December 19 | 7:00 p.m. | vs. Northern Illinois* | No. 25 | Qualcomm Stadium; San Diego, CA (Poinsettia Bowl) | ESPN2 | W 37–7 | 29,709 |
*Non-conference game; ^{†}Homecoming; Rankings from AP Poll released prior to the game; All times are in Central time

== Rankings ==
Ranking movements Legend: ██ Increase in ranking ██ Decrease in ranking — = Not ranked RV = Received votes
| | Week | | | | | | | | | | | | | | | |
| Poll | Pre | 1 | 2 | 3 | 4 | 5 | 6 | 7 | 8 | 9 | 10 | 11 | 12 | 13 | 14 | Final |
|---|---|---|---|---|---|---|---|---|---|---|---|---|---|---|---|---|
| AP | 22 | 23 | 20 | 16 | 17 | RV | — | — | — | — | RV | RV | RV | RV | 25 | 22 |
| Coaches | 21 | 22 | 20 | 15 | 15 | RV | — | — | — | — | RV | RV | RV | RV | 24 | 21 |
| Harris | Not released | | | | 17 | — | — | — | — | — | — | — | — | — | 24 | Not released |
| BCS | Not released | | | | | | | — | — | — | — | — | — | — | — | Not released |

== Game summaries ==
=== Baylor ===
| | 1 | 2 | 3 | 4 | Total |
|---|---|---|---|---|---|
| TCU | 0 | 0 | 10 | 7 | 17 |
| Baylor | 0 | 7 | 0 | 0 | 7 |

=== UC Davis ===
| | 1 | 2 | 3 | 4 | Total |
|---|---|---|---|---|---|
| UC Davis | 3 | 7 | 3 | 0 | 13 |
| TCU | 7 | 16 | 14 | 9 | 46 |

=== Texas Tech ===
| | 1 | 2 | 3 | 4 | Total |
|---|---|---|---|---|---|
| Texas Tech | 3 | 0 | 0 | 0 | 3 |
| TCU | 3 | 3 | 3 | 3 | 12 |

=== BYU ===
| | 1 | 2 | 3 | 4 | Total |
|---|---|---|---|---|---|
| BYU | 3 | 7 | 7 | 14 | 31 |
| TCU | 0 | 3 | 7 | 7 | 17 |

=== Utah ===
| | 1 | 2 | 3 | 4 | Total |
|---|---|---|---|---|---|
| TCU | 0 | 7 | 0 | 0 | 7 |
| Utah | 3 | 14 | 3 | 0 | 20 |

=== Army ===
| | 1 | 2 | 3 | 4 | Total |
|---|---|---|---|---|---|
| TCU | 7 | 24 | 0 | 0 | 31 |
| Army | 3 | 0 | 7 | 7 | 17 |

=== Wyoming ===
| | 1 | 2 | 3 | 4 | Total |
|---|---|---|---|---|---|
| Wyoming | 0 | 0 | 0 | 3 | 3 |
| TCU | 9 | 0 | 10 | 7 | 26 |

=== UNLV ===
| | 1 | 2 | 3 | 4 | Total |
|---|---|---|---|---|---|
| TCU | 9 | 10 | 3 | 3 | 25 |
| UNLV | 0 | 3 | 0 | 7 | 10 |

=== New Mexico ===
| | 1 | 2 | 3 | 4 | Total |
|---|---|---|---|---|---|
| TCU | 14 | 10 | 0 | 3 | 27 |
| New Mexico | 0 | 0 | 14 | 7 | 21 |

=== San Diego State ===
| | 1 | 2 | 3 | 4 | Total |
|---|---|---|---|---|---|
| San Diego St | 0 | 0 | 0 | 0 | 0 |
| TCU | 14 | 24 | 14 | 0 | 52 |

=== Colorado State ===
| | 1 | 2 | 3 | 4 | Total |
|---|---|---|---|---|---|
| TCU | 3 | 28 | 14 | 0 | 45 |
| Colorado St | 7 | 0 | 7 | 0 | 14 |

=== Air Force ===
| | 1 | 2 | 3 | 4 | Total |
|---|---|---|---|---|---|
| Air Force | 0 | 0 | 0 | 14 | 14 |
| TCU | 14 | 10 | 14 | 0 | 38 |

=== Poinsettia Bowl ===
| | 1 | 2 | 3 | 4 | Total |
|---|---|---|---|---|---|
| Northern Illinois | 0 | 0 | 0 | 7 | 7 |
| TCU | 6 | 10 | 14 | 7 | 37 |

== Personnel ==
=== Coaching staff ===
| Name | Position |
|---|---|
| Gary Patterson | Head Coach |
| Jarrett Anderson | Wide Receivers |
| Dick Bumpas | Defensive Coordinator/Defensive Line |
| Chad Glasgow | Safeties |
| Charles McMillian | Cornerbacks |
| Mike Schultz | Offensive Coordinator/Quarterbacks |
| Dan Sharp | Tight Ends/Special Teams |
| Tony Tademy | Linebackers |
| Eddie Williamson | Assistant Head Coach/Offensive Line |
| Justin Fuente | Running Backs |
| Brandon Johnson | Strength and Conditioning Coach |
| Matt Parker | Assoc. Coach – Strength and Conditioning |
| Don Sommer | Strength & Conditioning |
| Bryan Broaddus | Assistant Director-Football Operations |
| Mike Sinquefield | Director-Football Operations |
| Keith Carey | Graduate Assistant – Defense |
| Trey Haverty | Graduate Assistant – Offense |

=== Roster ===
2006 Roster
| Wide receivers: 2 Massey, Donald – JR; 3 Brock, Marcus – JR; 9 Bynum, Prince – SO; 9 Elenburg, Kagen – (redshirt) Fr; 10 Cage, William – SO; 13 Moore, Derek – JR; 18 Harmon, Quentily – SR; 19 DePriest, Michael – SR; 20 Johnson, Bart – FR; 21 Dickerson, Ervin – JR; 22 Christian, Ryan – (redshirt) Fr; 27 Galifaro, Austin – (redshirt) Fr; 82 Renfro, Clint – FR; 85 Bryant, Walter – SO; 88 Young, Jimmy – FR; Offensive line: 53 Wyatt, Ryan (redshirt) Fr; 60 Phillips, Preston – SO; 64 Lindner, Matty – JR; 65 Montgomery, Giles – SO; 68 Lowery, Adam – JR; 50 Marrou, Tyler – (redshirt) Fr; 61 Cannon, Marcus – FR; 62 Vernon, Josh – FR; 70 Newhouse, Marshall – FR; 72 Sefton, Ryan – JR; 73 Karlin, Josh – (redshirt) Fr; 74 Savino, Tony – JR; 76 Kirkpatrick, Jake – FR; 79 Richmond, Nic – (redshirt) Fr; 63 Raetz, Heath – SO; 66 Clark, Robert – SO; 71 Sisk, Wade – JR; 75 Schlueter, Blake – SO; 77 Bouldwin, Maurice – SR; 78 Taylor, Herbert – SR; Fullbacks: 36 Smith, Chris – (redshirt) Fr; 44 Cameron, Cash – (redshirt) Fr; 47 Jackson, William – JR | Tight ends: 80 Hecht, Brent – SR; 81 Andrus, Chad – SR; 84 Frosch, Evan – FR; 86 Reagan, Shae – SO; 87 Englert, Trey – JR; 89 Cunigan, Quinton – JR; 92 Stevens, Tom – JR; Quarterbacks: 11 Jackson, Marcus – (redshirt) Fr; 12 Eskridge, Zack – FR; 14 Dalton, Andy – FR; 16 Ballard, Jeff – SR; 17 Luttrell, Tyler – FR; Running backs: 23 Brown, Aaron – SO; 24 Turner, Joseph – (redshirt) Fr; 30 Hobbs, Lonta – SR; 32 Watts, Justin – SO; 33 Merrill, Robert – SR; 34 James, Detrick – SO; Defensive line: 52 Brown, Jon (redshirt) Fr; 55 Vess, James – SO; 56 Moore, Cody – SO; 57 Grant, Cory – FR; 58 Williams, Jarrarcea – SR; 59 Hailey, Niels – FR; 67 Haight, Sean – (redshirt) Fr; 69 Knight, Michael – (redshirt) Fr; 83 Retkofsky, Jared – SR; 90 Leatch, Clarence – FR; 91 Christopher, Allen – (redshirt) Fr; 93 Ortiz, Chase – JR; 94 Niutei, Henry – FR; 95 Newby, Jamison – SR; 96 Daniels, Wayne – FR; 97 Blake, Tommy – JR; 98 Hughes, Jerry – FR | Linebackers: 35 Ward, Andrew – SR; 37 Ingram, Darius – JR; 38 Gordon, Brenan – FR; 39 Phillips, Jason – SO; 41 Washington, Daryl – FR; 42 Panfil, Matt – SO; 46 Hawthorne, David – JR; 49 Gleaton, James – SO; 51 Henson, Robert – SO; Defensive backs: 1 Lewis, Ken – SR; 4 Coleman, Steven – SO; 6 Bonner, Brian - JR; 9 Russell, Vernon – SR; 45 Abbott, Christopher – JR; 10 Priest, Rafael – (redshirt) Fr; 15 Stewart, Torrey – JR; 17 Burrell, Andy – SO; 17 Hunter, Corderra – (redshirt) Fr; 20 Sanders, Nick – (redshirt) Fr; 25 Buchanan, Eric – SR; 26 White, Marvin – SR; 27 Roach, David – JR; 28 Jones, Colin – FR; 29 Hodge, Stephen – SO; 31 Gallegos, Elvis – SR; 40 Zavala, Justin - SR; 43 Clarke, Chris – JR; 43 Ibiloye, Alex – FR; 48 Ruelas, Kenneth – JR; Punters/Kickers: 2 Milliken, Garrett – FR; 7 Porter, David - FR; 11 Wash, Derek – JR; 13 LoCoco, Peter – SR; 40 Cortney, Brian – SR; 44 Manfredini, Chris – JR; 54 Lawson, Landry – (redshirt) Fr; 38 Walters, Zach – (redshirt) Fr |
