= Darren Mougey =

American football player and executive (born 1985)

New York Jets
- Title: General manager

Personal information
- Born: April 7, 1985 (age 41); Scottsdale, Arizona, U.S.
- Listed height: 6 ft 5 in (1.96 m)
- Listed weight: 219 lb (99 kg)

Career information
- Position: Wide receiver
- College: San Diego State (2005–2008)
- NFL draft: 2009: undrafted

Career history

Playing
- Atlanta Falcons (2009)*; Arizona Cardinals (2010)*
- * Offseason or practice squad member only

Operations
- Denver Broncos (2012–2024); Scouting intern (2012); Personnel & scouting assistant (2013); Area scout (2014–2019); Assistant director of college scouting (2020); Director of player personnel (2021); Assistant general manager (2022–2024); New York Jets (2025–present) General manager

Awards and highlights
- As an executive: Super Bowl champion (50)

Darren Webster Mougey (born April 7, 1985) is an American professional football executive and former wide receiver who is the general manager of the New York Jets of the National Football League (NFL). He played college football for the San Diego State Aztecs as a wide receiver and was signed by the Atlanta Falcons as an undrafted free agent in 2009.

Mougey began his professional executive career as a scouting intern in 2012 for the Denver Broncos and served in their personnel department from 2012 to 2024 before being named the general manager of the Jets in 2025.

== College career ==
Mougey attended Chaparral High School in Scottsdale, Arizona, and played for their football team as a quarterback. He was recruited to San Diego State University by then-head coach Tom Craft, and was rated as a three-star prospect by Rivals.com. During the 2006 season, Mougey started three games following a thumb injury to incumbent starting quarterback Kevin O'Connell.

The Aztecs wanted to utilize Mougey's superior size and athleticism, so they tried him out at wide receiver. At 6 feet 5 inches (1.96 m) and boasting an impressive knack for catching footballs, he became a starter in his first game as a receiver. He played nine games in 2007, finishing third on the team with 32 catches for 368 yards and scoring two touchdowns. He missed three games due to injury.

In his senior year in 2008, Mougey was matched with redshirt freshman quarterback Ryan Lindley, and Mougey was expected to be the main target of the young passer. Mougey missed two games, but still managed to improve his production to 34 receptions for 437 yards while scoring five times. He led the team in yards-per-catch average at 12.9 out of players with at least ten catches, and he had a 43-yard reception.

== Professional career ==
Pre-draft measurables
| Height | Weight |
|---|---|
| 6 ft 4 5/8 in (1.95 m) | 230 lb (104 kg) |
Values from Pro Day

Mougey went undrafted in the 2009 NFL draft. He was signed on the following Monday by the Atlanta Falcons. He was released by the Falcons on August 9.

On March 23, 2010, Mougey signed with the Arizona Cardinals.

== Executive career ==
=== Denver Broncos ===
In 2012, Mougey joined the Denver Broncos as a scouting intern. In 2013, he was hired by the Broncos as a personnel and scouting assistant.

In 2015, Mougey was promoted to area scout. In 2020, he was promoted to assistant director of college scouting.

In 2021, Mougey was retained and promoted to director of player personnel under general manager George Paton.

On February 3, 2022, Mougey was promoted to assistant general manager.

=== New York Jets ===
On January 25, 2025, Mougey was named the general manager of the New York Jets.

== Personal life ==
Mougey married Hannah Whitfield in 2017. They have two children together.
