= Nick Osborn =

American football player (born 1984)

Profile
- Position: Linebacker

Personal information
- Born: November 21, 1984 (age 41); Berkeley, California
- Listed height: 6 ft 4 in (1.93 m)
- Listed weight: 260 lb (118 kg)

Career information
- College: San Diego State
- NFL draft: 2008: undrafted

Career history
- Chicago Bears (2008)*; California Redwoods (2009)*
- * Offseason or practice squad member only

Nick Osborn (born November 21, 1984) is an American former football linebacker. He was signed by the Chicago Bears as an undrafted free agent in 2008. He played college football at San Diego State.

== Professional career ==
=== Chicago Bears ===
After going undrafted in the 2008 NFL draft, Osborn signed with the Chicago Bears as an undrafted free agent. He was waived during final cuts on August 30.

=== California Redwoods ===
After spending the 2008 season out of football, Osborn was signed by the California Redwoods of the United Football League on August 18, 2009.
