= 2006 Colorado State Rams football team =

American college football season

2006 Colorado State Rams football
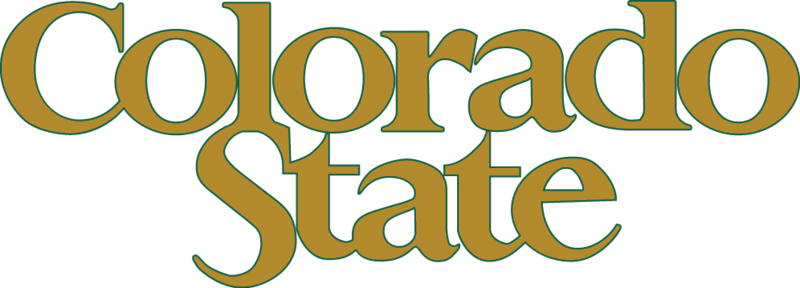
- Conference: Mountain West Conference
- Record: 4–8 (1–7 MW)
- Head coach: Sonny Lubick (14th season)
- Offensive coordinator: Dan Hammerschmidt (6th season)
- Defensive coordinator: Steve Stanard (4th season)
- Home stadium: Sonny Lubick Field at Hughes Stadium

2006 Mountain West Conference football standings
	Conf.			Overall
Team	W		L	W		L
No. 16 BYU $	8	–	0	11	–	2
No. 22 TCU	6	–	2	11	–	2
Utah	5	–	3	8	–	5
Wyoming	5	–	3	6	–	6
New Mexico	4	–	4	6	–	7
Air Force	3	–	5	4	–	8
San Diego State	3	–	5	3	–	9
Colorado State	1	–	7	4	–	8
UNLV	1	–	7	2	–	10
$ – Conference champion; Rankings from AP Poll

The 2006 Colorado State Rams football team represented Colorado State University during the 2006 NCAA Division I FBS football season. They played their home games at Hughes Stadium in Fort Collins, Colorado and were led by head coach Sonny Lubick.

== Schedule ==
Date	Time	Opponent	Site	TV	Result	Attendance
September 2	3:00 pm	Weber State*	Hughes Stadium; Fort Collins, CO		W 30–6	28,801
September 9	3:00 pm	vs. Colorado*	Invesco Field at Mile High; Denver, CO (Rocky Mountain Showdown)	CSTV	W 14–10	65,701
September 16	7:00 pm	at Nevada*	Mackay Stadium; Reno, NV		L 10–28	18,883
September 30	8:00 pm	at Fresno State*	Bulldog Stadium; Fresno, CA		W 35–23	42,012
October 7	3:30 pm	UNLV	Hughes Stadium; Fort Collins, CO	mtn	W 28–7	32,841
October 12	6:00 pm	at Air Force	Falcon Stadium; USAFA, CO (Ram–Falcon Trophy)	CSTV	L 21–24	30,008
October 21	2:00 pm	at Wyoming	War Memorial Stadium; Laramie, WY (Bronze Boot)	CSTV	L 0–24	23,247
October 28	3:30 pm	New Mexico	Hughes Stadium; Fort Collins, CO		L 19–20	22,011
November 4	4:30 pm	BYU	Hughes Stadium; Fort Collins, CO	mtn	L 3–24	21,117
November 11	12:00 pm	at Utah	Rice-Eccles Stadium; Salt Lake City, UT	mtn	L 22–35	39,532
November 25	5:00 pm	TCU	Hughes Stadium; Fort Collins, CO	mtn	L 14–45	16,146
December 2	6:00 pm	at San Diego State	Qualcomm Stadium; San Diego, CA	mtn	L 6–17	17,557
*Non-conference game; All times are in Mountain time

== Roster ==
2006 Colorado State Rams football team roster
Players
Coaches
Offense

Pos.	#	Name	Class
RB	29	Kyle Bell	Jr
OL	71	Clint Oldenburg	Sr

Defense

Pos.	#	Name	Class
DE	44	Bob Vomhof	Jr
DE	91	Tommie Hill	So

Special teams

Pos.	#	Name	Class
P	8	Jimmie Kaylor	Jr

Head coach

- Sonny Lubick

Coordinators/assistant coaches

Legend

- (C) Team captain
- (S) Suspended
- (I) Ineligible
- Injured
- Redshirt

Roster

== Team players in the NFL ==
Round	Pick	Player	Position	NFL Club
5	171	Clint Oldenburg	T	New England Patriots
