= 2006 Wyoming Cowboys football team =

American college football season

2006 Wyoming Cowboys football
- Conference: Mountain West Conference
- Record: 6–6 (5–3 MW)
- Head coach: Joe Glenn (4th season)
- Offensive coordinator: Billy Cockhill (4th season)
- Offensive scheme: Multiple
- Defensive coordinator: Mike Breske (4th season)
- Base defense: 3–4
- Home stadium: War Memorial Stadium

2006 Mountain West Conference football standings
	Conf.			Overall
Team	W		L	W		L
No. 16 BYU $	8	–	0	11	–	2
No. 22 TCU	6	–	2	11	–	2
Utah	5	–	3	8	–	5
Wyoming	5	–	3	6	–	6
New Mexico	4	–	4	6	–	7
Air Force	3	–	5	4	–	8
San Diego State	3	–	5	3	–	9
Colorado State	1	–	7	4	–	8
UNLV	1	–	7	2	–	10
$ – Conference champion; Rankings from AP Poll

The 2006 Wyoming Cowboys football team represented the University of Wyoming as a member Mountain West Conference (MW) during the 2006 NCAA Division I FBS football season. Led by fourth-year head coach Joe Glenn, the Cowboys compiled an overall record of 6–6 record with mark 5–3 in conference play, tying for third place in the MW. The team played home games at War Memorial Stadium in Laramie, Wyoming.

== Schedule ==
Date	Time	Opponent	Site	TV	Result	Attendance
September 2	2:30 pm	Utah State*	War Memorial Stadium; Laramie, WY (rivalry)		W 38–7	18,531
September 9	1:30 pm	at Virginia*	Scott Stadium; Charlottesville, VA		L 12–13 ^{OT}	60,429
September 16	1:30 pm	Boise State*	War Memorial Stadium; Laramie, WY	mtn.	L 10–17	17,880
September 23	2:30 pm	Air Force	War Memorial Stadium; Laramie, WY		L 24–31	20,177
September 30	11:30 am	at Syracuse*	Carrier Dome; Syracuse, NY	ESPN360	L 34–40 ^{2OT}	38,447
October 7	6:00 pm	at New Mexico	University Stadium; Albuquerque, NM		W 14–10	31,375
October 14	1:00 pm	Utah^{†}	War Memorial Stadium; Laramie, WY	mtn	W 31–15	20,806
October 21	2:00 pm	Colorado State	War Memorial Stadium; Laramie, WY (Border War)	CSTV	W 24–0	23,247
October 28	5:30 pm	at TCU	Amon G. Carter Stadium; Fort Worth, TX	mtn	L 3–26	31,394
November 4	1:00 pm	San Diego State	War Memorial Stadium; Laramie, WY	mtn	W 27–24	14,012
November 9	6:00 pm	at No. 25 BYU	LaVell Edwards Stadium; Provo, UT	CSTV	L 7–55	59,901
November 18	2:00 pm	at UNLV	Sam Boyd Stadium; Las Vegas, NV		W 34–26	14,021
*Non-conference game; ^{†}Homecoming; Rankings from AP Poll released prior to the game; All times are in Mountain time
