= 2006 New Mexico Lobos football team =

American college football season

2006 New Mexico Lobos football
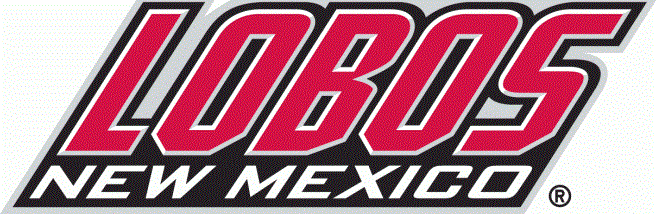

New Mexico Bowl, L 12–20 vs. San Jose State
- Conference: Mountain West Conference
- Record: 6–7 (4–4 MW)
- Head coach: Rocky Long (9th season)
- Offensive coordinator: Bob Toledo (1st season)
- Offensive scheme: West Coast
- Defensive coordinator: Osia Lewis (4th season)
- Base defense: 3–3–5
- Home stadium: University Stadium

2006 Mountain West Conference football standings
| | Conf. | | | Overall |
| Team | W | | L | W | | L |
|---|---|---|---|---|---|---|
| No. 16 BYU $ | 8 | – | 0 | 11 | – | 2 |
| No. 22 TCU | 6 | – | 2 | 11 | – | 2 |
| Utah | 5 | – | 3 | 8 | – | 5 |
| Wyoming | 5 | – | 3 | 6 | – | 6 |
| New Mexico | 4 | – | 4 | 6 | – | 7 |
| Air Force | 3 | – | 5 | 4 | – | 8 |
| San Diego State | 3 | – | 5 | 3 | – | 9 |
| Colorado State | 1 | – | 7 | 4 | – | 8 |
| UNLV | 1 | – | 7 | 2 | – | 10 |
$ – Conference champion; Rankings from AP Poll

The 2006 New Mexico Lobos football team represented the University of New Mexico as a member of the Mountain West Conference (MW) during the 2006 NCAA Division I FBS football season. Led by ninth-year head coach Rocky Long, the Lobos compiled an overall record of 6–7 with a mark of 4–4 in conference play, placing fifth in the MW. New Mexico was invited to the New Mexico Bowl, where the Lobos lost to San Jose State. The team played home games at University Stadium in Albuquerque, New Mexico.

== Schedule ==
| Date | Time | Opponent | Site | TV | Result | Attendance | Source |
|---|---|---|---|---|---|---|---|
| September 2 | 6:30 pm | Portland State* | University Stadium; Albuquerque, NM | mtn | L 6–17 | 27,535 | |
| September 9 | 6:00 pm | at New Mexico State* | Aggie Memorial Stadium; Las Cruces, NM (Rio Grande Rivalry) | ESPN Plus | W 34–28 | 29,095 | |
| September 16 | 6:00 pm | Missouri* | University Stadium; Albuquerque, NM | mtn | L 17–27 | 27,806 | |
| September 23 | 3:00 pm | UTEP* | University Stadium; Albuquerque, NM | CSTV | W 26–13 | 34,069 | |
| September 30 | 12:00 pm | at Air Force | Falcon Stadium; Colorado Springs, CO | mtn | L 7–24 | 40,453 | |
| October 7 | 6:00 pm | Wyoming^{†} | University Stadium; Albuquerque, NM | | L 10–14 | 31,375 | |
| October 14 | 8:00 pm | at UNLV | Sam Boyd Stadium; Whitney, NV | mtn | W 39–36 ^{OT} | 16,456 | |
| October 19 | 7:00 pm | Utah | University Stadium; Albuquerque, NM | mtn | W 34–31 | 23,471 | |
| October 28 | 3:30 pm | at Colorado State | Hughes Stadium; Fort Collins, CO | | W 20–19 | 22,011 | |
| November 11 | 3:30 pm | TCU | University Stadium; Albuquerque, NM | mtn | L 21–27 | 32,754 | |
| November 18 | 2:00 pm | at No. 23 BYU | LaVell Edwards Stadium; Provo, UT | mtn | L 17–42 | 63,814 | |
| November 25 | 12:30 pm | San Diego State | University Stadium; Albuquerque, NM | | W 41–14 | 23,421 | |
| December 23 | 2:30 pm | San Jose State* | University Stadium; Albuquerque, NM (New Mexico Bowl) | ESPN | L 12–20 | 34,111 | |
*Non-conference game; ^{†}Homecoming; Rankings from AP Poll released prior to the game; All times are in Mountain time
