= 2006 Air Force Falcons football team =

American college football season

2006 Air Force Falcons football
- Conference: Mountain West Conference
- Record: 4–8 (3–5 MW)
- Head coach: Fisher DeBerry (23rd season)
- Offensive scheme: Wishbone triple option
- Defensive coordinator: Richard Bell (12th season)
- Base defense: 3–4
- Captains: Shaun Carney; Curtis Grantham; Gilberto Perez; Chris Sutton
- Home stadium: Falcon Stadium

2006 Mountain West Conference football standings
	Conf.			Overall
Team	W		L	W		L
No. 16 BYU $	8	–	0	11	–	2
No. 22 TCU	6	–	2	11	–	2
Utah	5	–	3	8	–	5
Wyoming	5	–	3	6	–	6
New Mexico	4	–	4	6	–	7
Air Force	3	–	5	4	–	8
San Diego State	3	–	5	3	–	9
Colorado State	1	–	7	4	–	8
UNLV	1	–	7	2	–	10
$ – Conference champion; Rankings from AP Poll

The 2006 Air Force Falcons football team represented the United States Air Force Academy as a member of the Mountain West Conference (MW) during the 2006 NCAA Division I FBS football season. Led by Fisher DeBerry in his 23rd and final season as head coach, the Falcons compiled an overall record of 4–8 with a mark of 3–5 in conference play, tying for sixth place in the MW. The team played home games at Falcon Stadium in Colorado Springs, Colorado

DeBerry announced his retirement following the conclusion of the season.

== Schedule ==
Date	Time	Opponent	Site	TV	Result	Attendance
September 9	5:00 p.m.	at No. 11 Tennessee*	Neyland Stadium; Knoxville, TN		L 30–31	105,466
September 23	2:30 p.m.	at Wyoming	War Memorial Stadium; Laramie, WY		W 31–24	20,177
September 30	12:00 p.m.	New Mexico	Falcon Stadium; Colorado Springs, CO	mtn.	W 24–7	40,453
October 7	12:00 p.m.	Navy*	Falcon Stadium; Colorado Springs, CO (Commander-in-Chief's Trophy)	CSTV	L 17–24	45,246
October 12	6:00 p.m.	Colorado State	Falcon Stadium; Colorado Springs, CO (rivalry)	mtn.	W 24–21	30,008
October 21	6:00 p.m.	at San Diego State	Qualcomm Stadium; San Diego, CA	mtn.	L 12–19	26,871
October 28	12:00 p.m.	BYU	Falcon Stadium; Colorado Springs, CO	Versus	L 14–33	35,521
November 3	6:00 p.m.	at Army*	Michie Stadium; West Point, NY (Commander-in-Chief's Trophy)	ESPN2	W 43–7	32,066
November 11	2:00 p.m.	No. 9 Notre Dame*	Falcon Stadium; Colorado Springs, CO (rivalry)	CSTV	L 17–39	49,367
November 18	5:30 p.m.	Utah	Falcon Stadium; Colorado Springs, CO	mtn.	L 14–17	27,611
November 24	5:00 p.m.	at UNLV	Sam Boyd Stadium; Whitney, NV	mtn.	L 39–42	13,927
December 2	1:30 p.m.	at TCU	Amon G. Carter Stadium; Fort Worth, TX	CSTV	L 14–38	30,767
*Non-conference game; Rankings from AP Poll released prior to the game; All times are in Mountain time

== Roster ==
2006 Air Force Falcons football team roster
Players
Coaches
Offense

Pos.	#	Name	Class
QB		Shaun Carney	Jr
SB		Chad Hall	Jr

Defense

Pos.	#	Name	Class

Special teams

Pos.	#	Name	Class

Head coach

- Fisher DeBerry

Coordinators/assistant coaches

Legend

- (C) Team captain
- (S) Suspended
- (I) Ineligible
- Injured
- Redshirt
