= Sonny Lubick Field at Hughes Stadium =

Stadium in Colorado, U.S. (1968–2018)

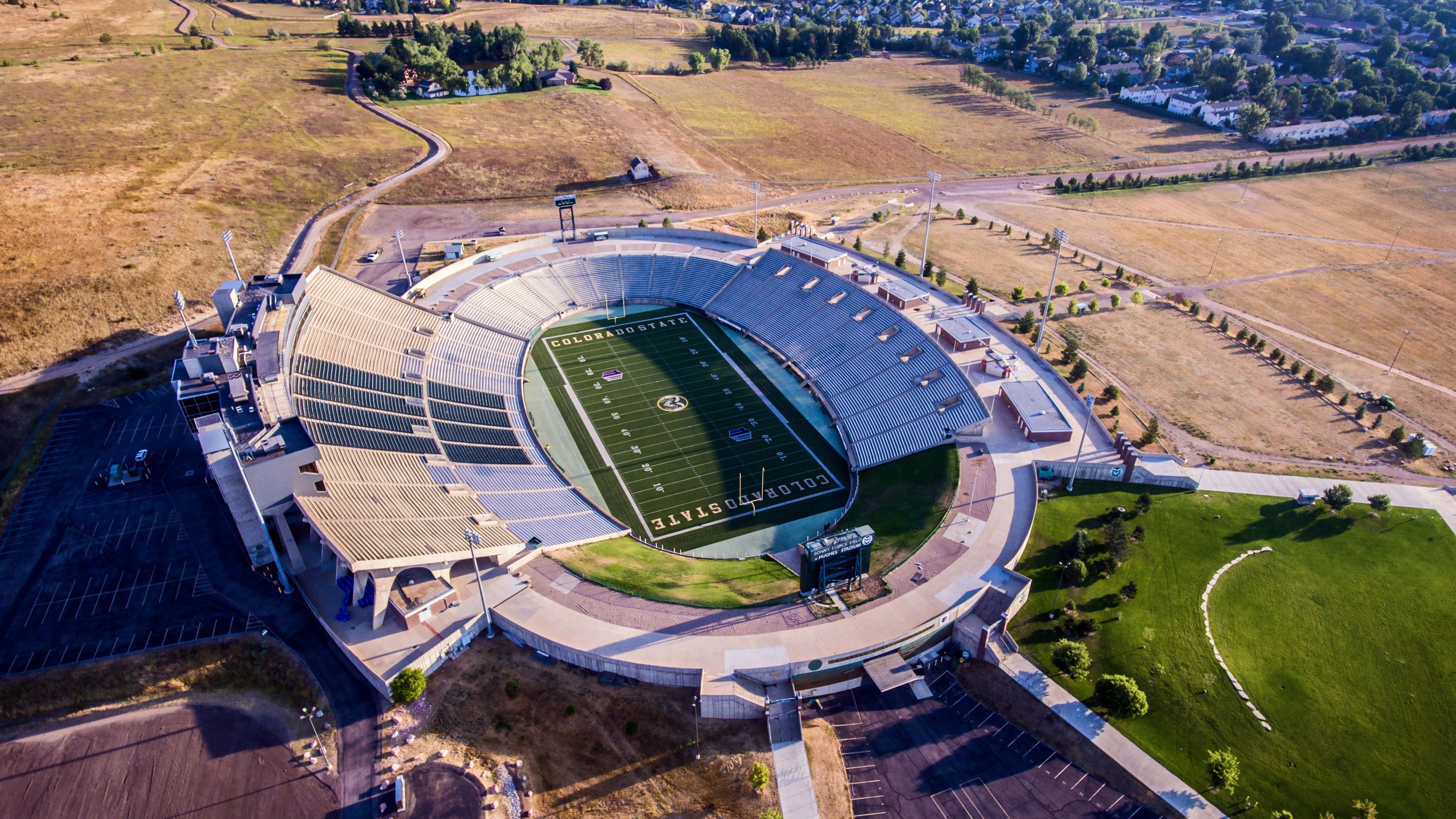
- Aerial view from south in 2016

- Location in the United States Location in Colorado
- Interactive map of Sonny Lubick Field at Hughes Stadium
- Former names: Hughes Stadium (1968–2002)
- Location: S. Overland Trail; Fort Collins, Colorado, U.S.
- Coordinates: 40.562°N 105.142°W
- Owner: Colorado State University
- Operator: Colorado State University
- Capacity: 32,500 (2005–2016); 30,000 (1969–2004)
- Surface: FieldTurf (2006–2016); Natural grass (1968–2005)
- Record attendance: 39,107 (vs. Utah, 1994)

Construction
- Groundbreaking: May 1967
- Opened: September 28, 1968; 57 years ago
- Renovated: 2005
- Closed: November 19, 2016; 9 years ago
- Demolished: April 10, 2018 (start date)
- Cost: $2.8 million ($25.9 million in 2025)
- Architects: Aller-Lingle Architects (2005 renovation)

Tenants
- Colorado State Rams (NCAA) (1968–2016)

Sonny Lubick Field at Hughes Stadium was an outdoor college football stadium in the western United States, located in Fort Collins, Colorado. It was the home field of the Colorado State Rams of the Pac-12 Conference from 1968 through 2016; the team moved in 2017 to the new on-campus Colorado State Stadium (now Canvas Stadium).

The playing field had a mostly conventional north-south alignment, skewed slightly northwest-southeast, at an approximate elevation of 5,190 feet (1,580 m) above sea level. It was natural grass for the stadium's first 38 years; FieldTurf was installed in the summer of 2006 for the final eleven seasons.

== History ==
Owned and operated by Colorado State University, it stood on a 161-acre (65 ha) site near Horsetooth Reservoir, about four miles (6 km) west of the school's main campus. The stadium opened in 1968 as the replacement for the old Colorado Field, a 14,000-seat on-campus stadium that is now the site of the "Jack Christiansen Track."

Hughes Stadium sat in a natural oval bowl, with seating on three sides and an open grass berm (not open for seating) behind the south end zone. The west (home side) stands were expanded out of the bowl and capped by a press box. Named for Harry W. Hughes, the head coach for 31 seasons (1911–41) at what was then known as Colorado Agricultural, the stadium had a seating capacity of 32,500 with club seats and 12 luxury suites, completed in 2005.

The playing surface itself was named in 2003 in honor of then head coach Sonny Lubick. The winningest coach in school history, he led the Rams for fifteen seasons (1993–2007), winning six conference titles with nine bowl game appearances.

The inaugural game at Hughes Stadium was played on September 28, 1968, a 17–12 loss to North Texas State, led by defensive tackle Mean Joe Greene, a consensus All-American. From October 1989 to August 1991, the Rams won eight consecutive games at the stadium, a school record. After 49 seasons, its finale in 2016 saw the Rams defeat New Mexico 49–31 on November 19.

Bob Dylan recorded the NBC television special and live concert album Hard Rain at Hughes Stadium during a rainstorm in May 1976.

=== Demolition ===
At the time of its closure, future plans for Hughes Stadium were unknown, but it was unlikely to be left dormant or given away, rather more likely to be developed for high-density residential use. CSU eventually decided to demolish the stadium and restore the site to its original bowl-shaped topography before selling the site for future development.

Pre-demolition work began in March 2018 with hazardous material mitigation (mainly asbestos), with full-scale demolition beginning on April 10. Demolition continued into summer, followed by filling in the stadium bowl with soil that had been originally used to create berms around the stadium; the project was completed in late 2018.

== Attendance ==
Attendance information for primary tenant, Colorado State Rams.

Season	Games	Sellouts	W-L	Attendance	Average	% of Capacity
2002	5	3	4–1	152,037	30,461	102% of 30,000
2003	6	3	4–2	183,786	30,631	102% of 30,000
2004	6	3	3–3	163,776	27,296	91% of 30,000
2005	5	2	4–1	146,737	29,347	90% of 32,500
2006	5	1	2–3	120,916	24,183	75% of 32,500
2007	6	0	2–4	130,762	21,793	67% of 32,500
2008	6	0	4–2	126,046	21,007	65% of 32,500
2009	6	0	2–4	141,856	23,642	73% of 32,500
2010	5	0	2–3	111,998	22,400	69% of 32,500
2011	6	0	1–5	131,202	21,867	67% of 32,500
2012	6	0	3–3	115,501	19,250	59% of 32,500
2013	6	0	4–2	111,598	18,600	57% of 32,500
2014	6	2	6–0	159,450	26,575	82% of 32,500
2015	6	2	3–3	149,500	24,916	77% of 32,500
2016	6	1	5–1	165,598	27,600	85% of 32,500
