= Matt Forte =

American football player (born 1985)

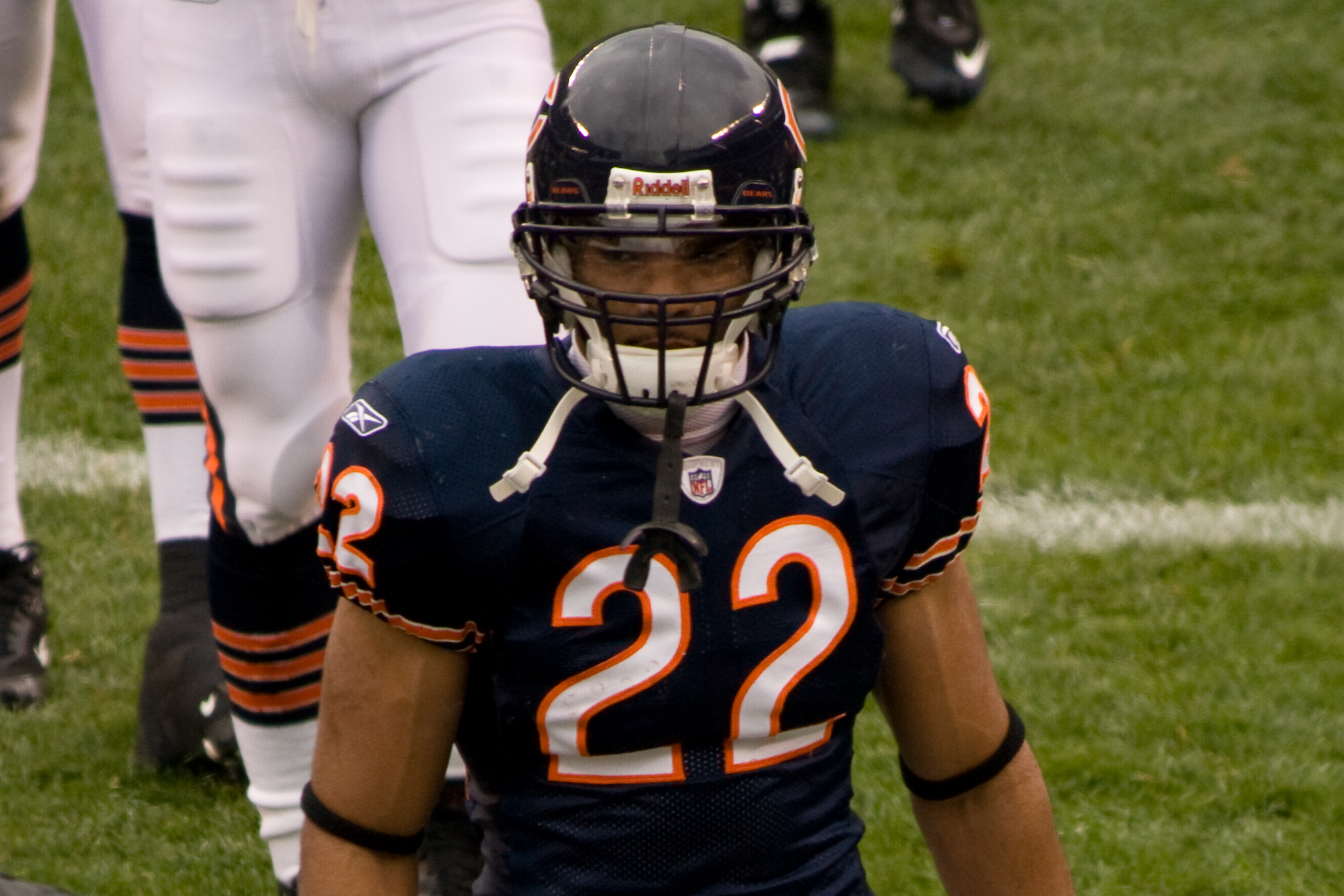
- Forte with the Chicago Bears in 2008

No. 22
- Position: Running back

Personal information
- Born: December 10, 1985 (age 40); Lake Charles, Louisiana, U.S.
- Listed height: 6 ft 2 in (1.88 m)
- Listed weight: 218 lb (99 kg)

Career information
- High school: Slidell (Slidell, Louisiana)
- College: Tulane (2004–2007)
- NFL draft: 2008: 2nd round, 44th overall pick

Career history
- Chicago Bears (2008–2015); New York Jets (2016–2017)

Awards and highlights
- 2× Pro Bowl (2011, 2013); PFWA All-Rookie Team (2008); PFR 2010's All-Decade Team; 100 greatest Bears of All-Time; Third-team All-American (2007); 2× All-C-USA (2005, 2007)

Career NFL statistics
- Rushing yards: 9,796
- Rushing average: 4.2
- Rushing touchdowns: 54
- Receptions: 554
- Receiving yards: 4,672
- Receiving touchdowns: 21
- Stats at Pro Football Reference

Matthew Garrett Forte (born December 10, 1985) is an American former professional football player who was a running back for ten seasons in the National Football League (NFL). He played college football for the Tulane Green Wave and was drafted by the Chicago Bears in the second round of the 2008 NFL draft. Forte established himself as a dual-threat running back capable of earning yards as a rusher and receiver. He is one of only three players to record at least 1,000 rushing yards and 100 receptions in a single season. Forte spent eight seasons with the Bears before playing for the New York Jets for two seasons.

== Early life ==
Forte grew up in Slidell, Louisiana, and graduated from Slidell High School in 2004, where he was a letterman in football and track & field. As a junior, he rushed for 1,057 rushing yards with eight rushing touchdowns, and caught 30 passes for 365 yards and three receiving touchdowns. As a senior, he was named the St. Tammany Parish Player of the Year, District 5-5A Offensive MVP and received All-Metro selection accolades, as he gained 1,375 yards with 23 touchdowns and caught 18 passes for 253 yards and two receiving touchdowns. He totaled 2,432 rushing yards and 31 rushing touchdowns in his career, while also catching 48 passes for 618 receiving yards and five receiving touchdowns.

As a standout sprinter, Forte competed in track and had some of the better 100m and 200m times in the New Orleans area in 2003, with personal-bests of 10.68 seconds in the 100 meters and 22.10 seconds in the 200 meters.

College recruiting
Name	Hometown	School	Height	Weight	40^{‡}	Commit date
Matt Forte; Running back	Slidell, Louisiana	Slidell High School	6 ft 2 in (1.88 m)	220 lb (100 kg)	4.5	Dec 15, 2003
Matt Forte; Running back	Recruit ratings: Rivals:					
Overall recruit ranking:
‡ Refers to 40-yard dash; Note: In many cases, Scout, Rivals, 247Sports, On3, and ESPN may conflict in their listings of height, weight and 40 time.; In these cases, the average was taken. ESPN grades are on a 100-point scale.; Sources: "2004 Tulane Football Commitment List". Rivals.; "2004 Team Ranking". Rivals.com.

== College career ==
Forte played NCAA Division I college football at Tulane University in New Orleans, Louisiana, a member of Conference USA. He played from 2004 to 2006 under head coach Chris Scelfo and in 2007 under Bob Toledo.

=== 2004 season ===
As a freshman, Forte split a bulk of the carries with junior Jovon Jackson. On October 23, against UAB, he scored his first collegiate touchdown on a six-yard rush in the 59–55 victory. His major breakout game came against Army on November 13. In the 45–31 victory, he totaled 34 carries for 216 rushing yards and three rushing touchdowns to go along with three receptions for 67 receiving yards and a receiving touchdown. He had 624 rushing yards and four rushing touchdowns to go along with 20 receptions for 180 yards and two receiving touchdowns during Tulane's 5–6 season.

=== 2005 season ===
As a sophomore, Forte continued to share the backfield with Jovon Jackson. However, Forte got a majority of the carries for the season. He crossed the 100-yard rushing mark once in 2005, against Southern Miss on November 26. Overall, he had 169 carries for 655 rushing yards and four rushing touchdowns to go along with 23 receptions for 163 yards and one receiving touchdown during Tulane's tumultuous 2–9 season, which saw the Green Wave forced to play all of their games on the road and at neutral sites due to Hurricane Katrina.

=== 2006 season ===
Forte started his junior season in the lead role in the backfield. He got a majority of the carries, sharing the bulk of the total rushing attack with Ray Boudreaux and Ade Tuyo after going down to injury in early November. In the Green Wave's second game of the season, he had 29 carries for 170 rushing yards and a rushing touchdown in a victory over Mississippi State. Starting on October 7 against Rice, Forte totaled four consecutive games going over the 100-rushing yard mark. He scored six total touchdowns in the span, which had victories over Rice and Army but losses to UTEP and Auburn. His junior year was cut short when he suffered an injury in the game against Marshall on November 4. He finished his junior season with 859 rushing yards and eight rushing touchdowns to go along with 28 receptions for 360 receiving yards and two receiving touchdowns during Tulane's 4–8 season.

=== 2007 season ===
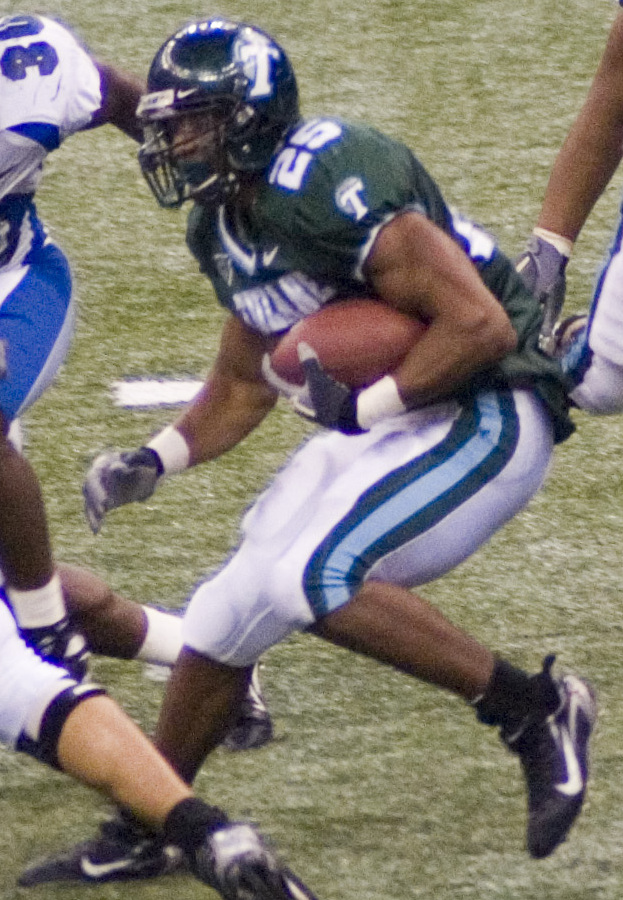
Forte at the Superdome in 2007

Forte returned from his injury to have a standout season under new head coach Bob Toledo. He got a wide majority of the Green Wave offense's total carries in their 4–8 season. Forte set several Tulane school records, including rushing for 2,127 rushing yards and 23 rushing touchdowns. He had five games with at least 200 rushing yards games, two games with at least 300 rushing yards games, and three games with at least four rushing touchdowns during the 2007 season. He finished second in the NCAA in rushing yards and rushing touchdowns in 2007, trailing only Kevin Smith of Central Florida. Forte was the only BCS non-AQ conference athlete to be a semifinalist for both the Maxwell and Doak Walker Awards and to make the Walter Camp Player of the Year List, and one of just three players nationally to be named to all three lists.

Forte garnered the most attention at the 2008 Senior Bowl in Mobile, Alabama, and walked away with the Overall MVP award. He led with 59 yards rushing on eight carries; four receptions for 38 yards and a tackle on special teams.

== Professional career ==
Pre-draft measurables
Height	Weight	40-yard dash	10-yard split	20-yard split	20-yard shuttle	Three-cone drill	Vertical jump	Broad jump	Bench press	Wonderlic
6 ft 1 3/8 in (1.86 m)	217 lb (98 kg)	4.46 s	1.49 s	2.55 s	4.23 s	6.84 s	33 in (0.84 m)	9 ft 10 in (3.00 m)	23 reps	18
All values from the 2008 NFL Combine

=== Chicago Bears ===
==== 2008 season ====
The Chicago Bears selected Forte in the second round of the 2008 NFL draft as the 44th overall selection, the sixth running back taken that year. He was originally drafted to compete with Cedric Benson for the team's starting running back position. However, Benson was released from the Bears after legal complications, and Forte out-competed Adrian Peterson and second-year running back Garrett Wolfe and started all 16 games. In the regular season debut on September 7, 2008, against the Indianapolis Colts, he carried the ball 23 times for 123 yards (setting a franchise record for most debut rushing yards) and scored his first career touchdown on a 50-yard run en route to a 29–13 victory over the Colts.

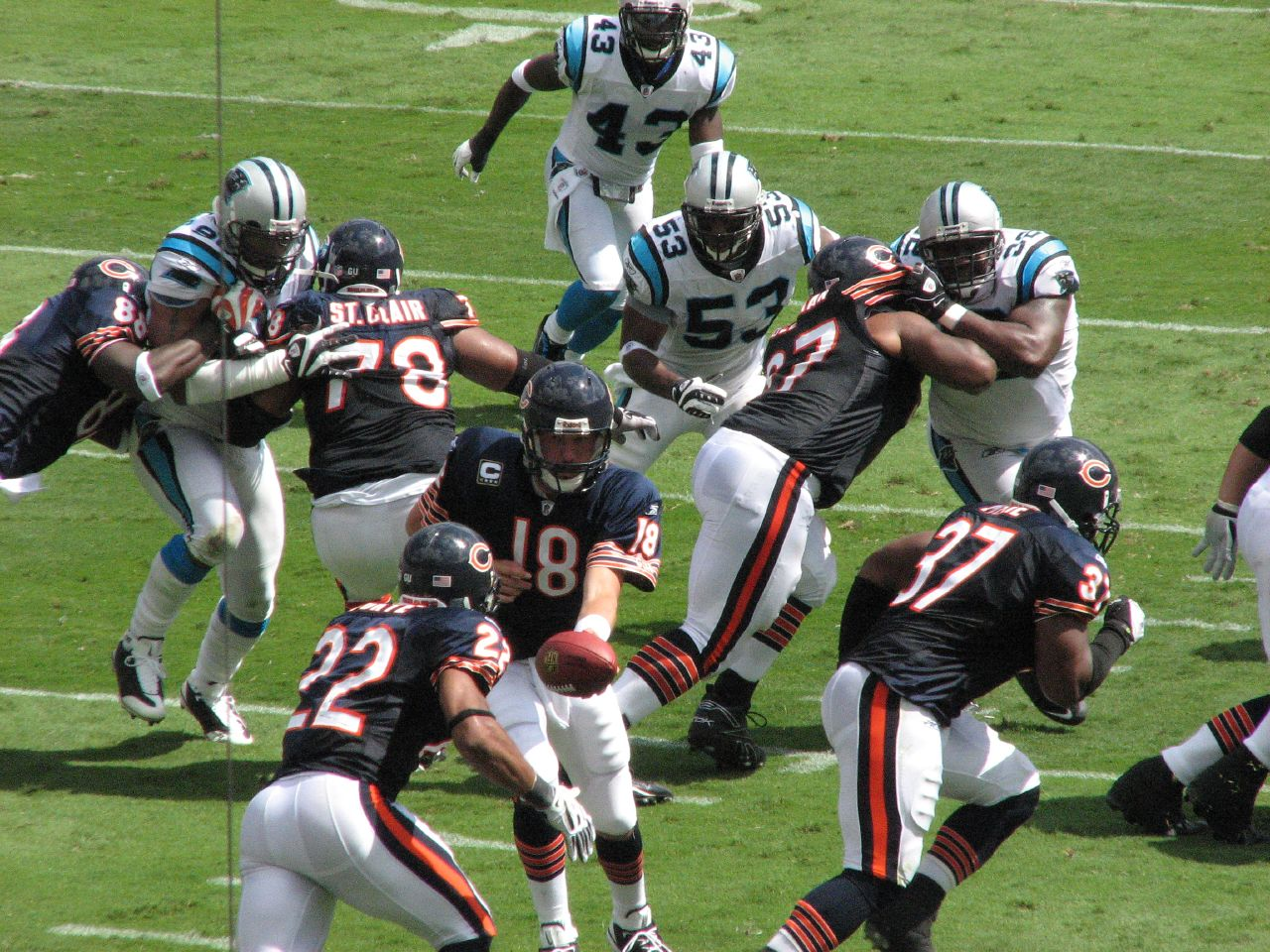
Forte takes a handoff from Kyle Orton while playing against the Carolina Panthers in September 2008

He had two more 100+ yard rushing games on the season, once against the Detroit Lions and the other against the St. Louis Rams. In Week 13, against the Minnesota Vikings, he became the first Bears rookie to rush for over 1,000 yards since Anthony Thomas in 2001. At the time, he finished with franchise rookie records of 316 carries for 1,238 rushing yards. His 1,715 yards from scrimmage was third in the NFL, and broke Hall of Famer Gale Sayers's team record of 1,374 in 1965. Forte led all rookie running backs in total yards and receptions, those 61 receptions also breaking Mike Ditka's 1961 franchise rookie record. He received one vote for the National Football League Rookie of the Year Award, finishing behind Ryan Clady, Chris Johnson, and Matt Ryan.

==== 2009 season ====
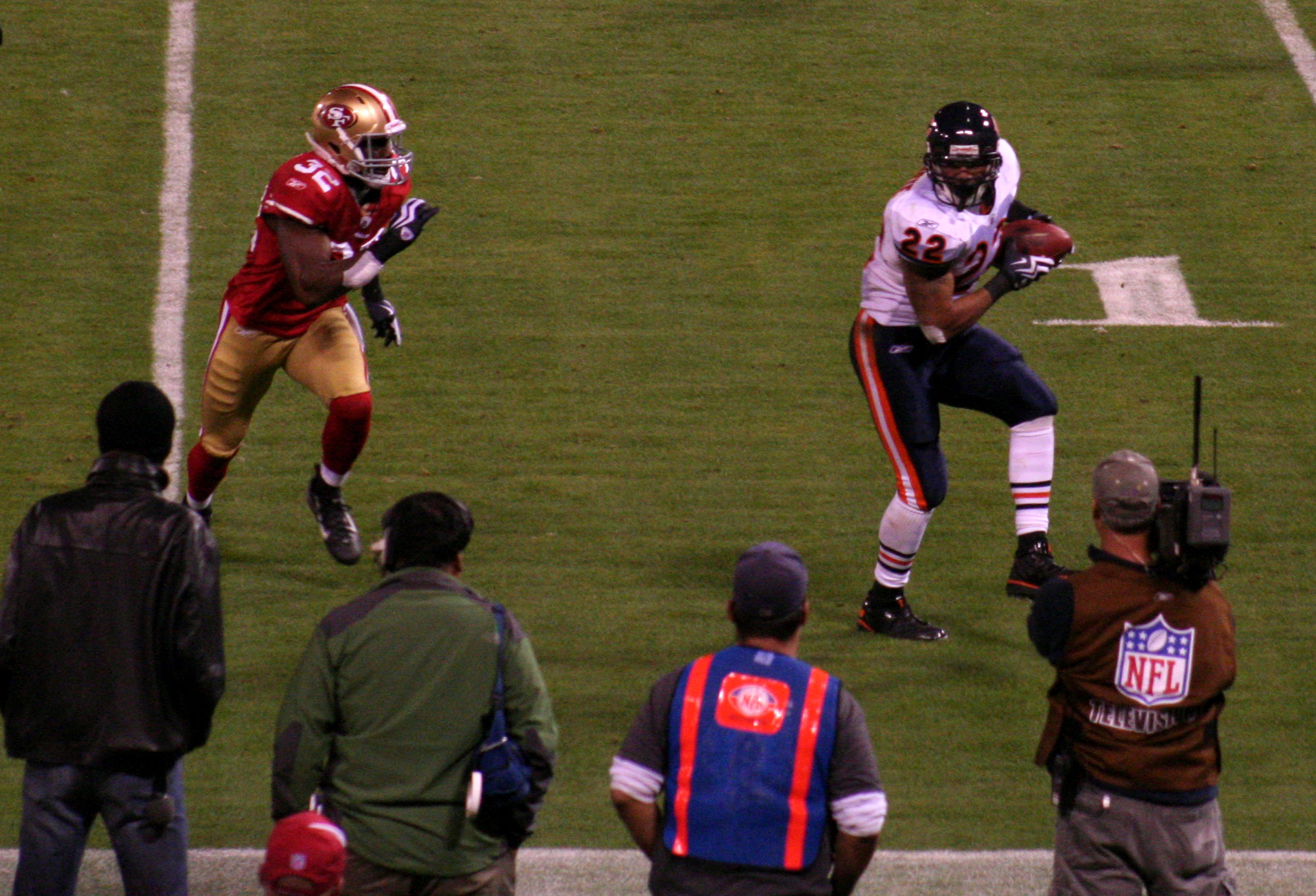
Forte attempts to escape from San Francisco 49ers safety Michael Lewis in a 2009 meeting

Forte recorded 150 total rushing yards over the first three games of the season before his first big game in Week 4 against the Detroit Lions, during which he rushed 12 times for 121 yards and scored his first touchdown. He averaged 50.6 yards per game over the next 11 games with three rushing touchdowns, before a 101-yard finale in the second divisional game against the Detroit Lions in Week 17. He finished the 2009 season with 258 carries for 929 rushing yards and four rushing touchdowns to go along with 57 receptions for 471 receiving yards. Despite the decrease in production, Forte dominated the carries in the Bears' backfield for the 2009 season, recording over 200 more attempts than Kahlil Bell.

==== 2010 season ====
In the regular season opener, Forte had a career-best 151 receiving yards including two receiving touchdowns, one for 89 yards and one for 28 yards, that put the Bears ahead late in the fourth quarter. In addition, he had 17 carries for 50 yards to give him his first game going over 200 scrimmage yards. He was named NFC Offensive Player of the Week for that performance in the 19–14 victory. In Week 5 against the Carolina Panthers, Forte had touchdown runs of 18 and 68 yards, the latter a career long, on the way to 166 total rushing yards on the day in the 23–6 victory. Forte was named FedEx Ground Player of the Week for this week. In Week 11 at the Miami Dolphins, the season's first Thursday Night Football game, Forte rushed for 97 yards on 25 carries and scored the game's only touchdown on a two-yard run in the fourth quarter as the Bears shutout the Dolphins, 16–0. Over the last seven games of the season, Forte had at least 90 rushing yards in five of them. His 1,616 yards from scrimmage ranked tenth in the NFL.

The Chicago Bears finished with an 11–5 record and made the playoffs. In the Divisional Round, Forte recorded 80 yards rushing and 54 yards receiving in a victory over the Seattle Seahawks. In the next round, he became the only player in Bears post-season history with at least ten receptions in the 21–14 loss to the Green Bay Packers in the NFC Championship.

==== 2011 season ====
Forte began the season primarily in a receiving role. He recorded 68, 49, and two rushing yards in his first three games; but had 90, 117, and 80 receiving yards, respectively. This changed in Week 4, when Forte rushed for a career-high 205 yards and one rushing touchdown against the Carolina Panthers, starting a stretch of four 100+ yard rushing performances over the next five games. Through nine games, Forte lead the Bears in rush attempts, rush yards, receptions, and receiving yards; and through Week 8 led the league in yards from scrimmage. In a game against the Philadelphia Eagles, Forte joined Herschel Walker as the only players with 700 rushing yards and 400 receiving yards in their first four seasons, and became the only player with 900 rushing yards and 400 receiving yards. After three less productive games, Forte sprained his MCL in a loss to the Chiefs, ending his season with 997 rushing yards, three rushing touchdowns, 490 receiving yards, and one receiving touchdown. However, he was placed on the NFC team for the 2012 Pro Bowl for the first time in his career, making him the first Bears running back to be named to the Pro Bowl since Neal Anderson in 1991. He was ranked 33rd by his fellow players on the NFL Top 100 Players of 2012.

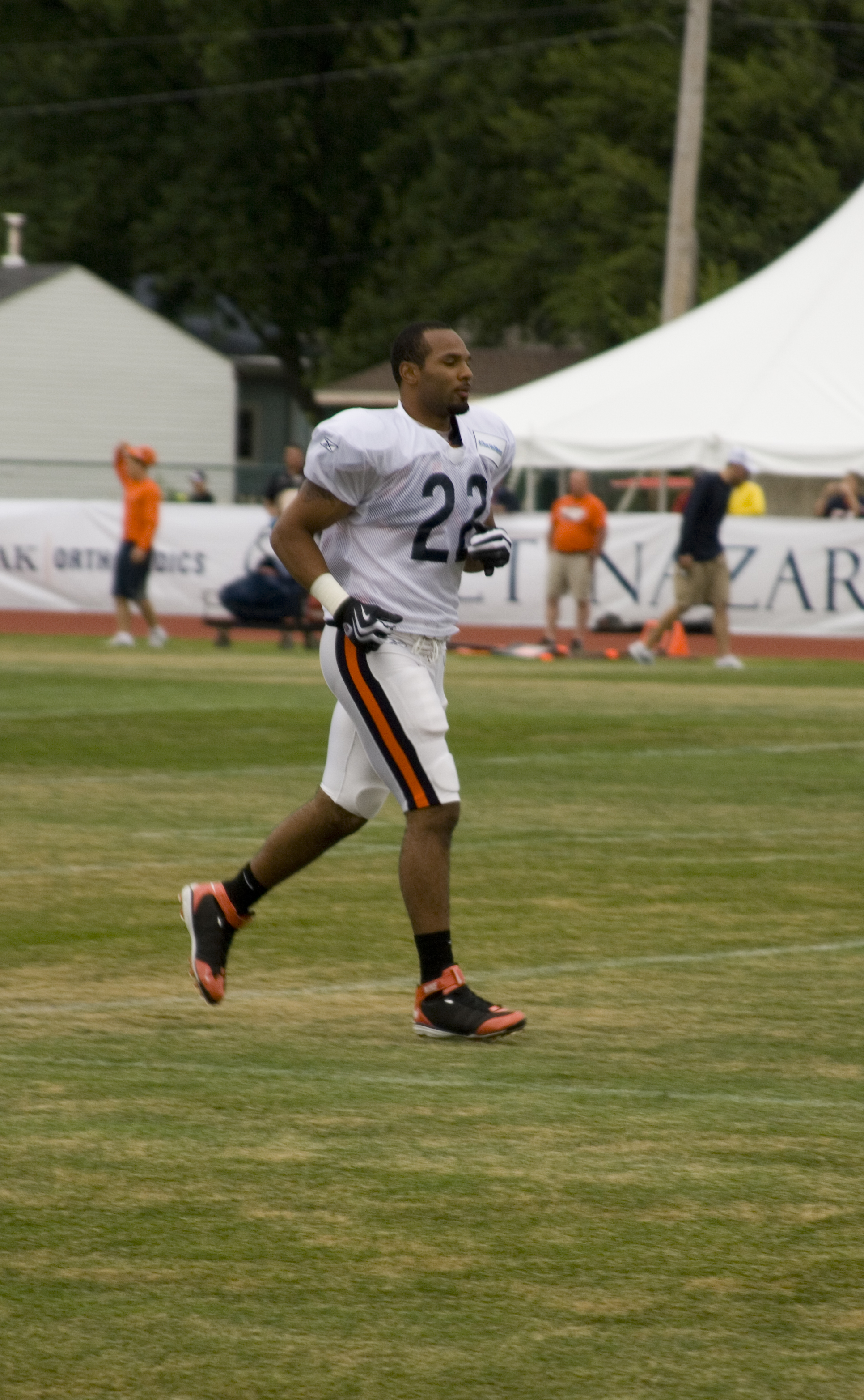
Forte during training camp in 2009

==== 2012 season ====
On March 2, 2012, Forte was given the franchise tag by the Bears, worth $7.74 million. However, Forte expressed his frustration and refused to sign the tender, which eventually led to the Bears signing Michael Bush. Forte then held out for a long-term contract, skipping the organized team activity (OTA) workouts, before finally agreeing to a four-year, $32 million deal. In Week 2 against the Green Bay Packers, Forte sustained an ankle injury when he was tackled by Packers cornerback Charles Woodson, originally reported as a dangerous "high ankle sprain" but later down-graded and he only missed one game. On the season, he had three 100+ yard rushing performances, and one game with 50+ yards receiving. Forte ended the 2012 season with 248 carries for 1,094 rushing yards and five rushing touchdowns to go along with a career-low 44 receptions for 340 yards, and dropped out from the top 10 in yards from scrimmage.

==== 2013 season ====
In Week 3 against the Pittsburgh Steelers, Forte had a 55-yard run, and the following week against the Detroit Lions, had a 53-yard run, making him the first Bears running back to record runs of 50+ yards in back-to-back games since Raymont Harris in 1997. Two weeks later, against the New Orleans Saints, Forte passed Rick Casares for third in the all-time leading rusher list with 5,702 career yards, behind Walter Payton and Neal Anderson. In Week 7 against the Washington Redskins, Forte scored three rushing touchdowns in the 45–41 loss. Against the Detroit Lions in Week 10, Forte recorded 49 yards from scrimmage to bring his season total to 1,023, and became the first player in Bears history and 18th NFL player to record 1,000 yards from scrimmage in each of his first six seasons. On November 24, 2013, Forte passed Neal Anderson for the second most career rushing yards in Bears franchise history. On December 27, Forte was named to the 2014 Pro Bowl. In the Week 17 loss to Green Bay, Forte recorded his 20th 100-yard rushing game, tying Gale Sayers for the second-most in Bears history. He also had three touchdowns, becoming the third Bear with two three-touchdown games in a season. Forte ended the 2013 season with a career-high nine rushing touchdowns along with 1,933 total yards from scrimmage, fifth-most in team history and the second-most behind Payton. Forte also had 1,339 rushing yards during the season, the ninth-most in franchise history. Forte's 1,339 rushing yards ranked second in the NFL in 2013, while his all-purpose yards from 1,933 yards ranked fourth. Following the regular season's conclusion, Forte was one of three finalists for the FedEx Ground Player of the Year Award, but finished runner-up to LeSean McCoy and Jamaal Charles. He was ranked 91st by his fellow players on the NFL Top 100 Players of 2014.

==== 2014 season ====
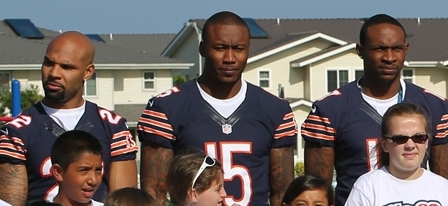
Forte with Brandon Marshall and Alshon Jeffery in 2014

In 2014, Forte solidified his reputation as one of the best receiving backs in NFL history, with five or more receptions in 14 of 16 games. This included twelve receptions for 105 yards in the fifth game, followed by ten receptions for 77 in the sixth game, becoming just the fourth Bear (since joined by Alshon Jeffery in 2015), and the second running back in NFL history with back-to-back 10+ reception games. He ended the season with 102 receptions, breaking Larry Centers' 1995 record for running backs, which was later eclipsed by Carolina Panthers running back, Christian McCaffrey in 2018. Forte also had three 100+ yard rushing games, and nine games with 100+ yards from scrimmage. He passed 1,000 yards rushing for the third consecutive season (joining Neal Anderson and Walter Payton as the only Bears to do so), and for the fifth time in his career (second only to Payton). He was ranked 48th by his fellow players on the NFL Top 100 Players of 2015.

==== 2015 season ====
In Week 1, Forte started with a season-best 141 rushing yards on 24 carries and a touchdown against Green Bay, his best since the 2011 season. His production was sub-par even before a knee injury at the hands of Minnesota's Harrison Smith sidelined him for three games. In 13 games in the 2015 season, Forte rushed for 898 yards and four touchdowns, and caught 44 passes for 389 yards and three touchdowns, a then-career-low 1,287 yards from scrimmage. He was ranked 90th by his fellow players on the NFL Top 100 Players of 2016.

On February 12, 2016, Forte announced that the Bears were not going to attempt to re-sign him in free agency. Ryan Pace, the Bears' general manager, later confirmed the Bears were not going to re-sign Forte. He praised Forte's contributions to the Bears by stating, "Matt is one of the all-time great Bears and did an excellent job for us on and off the field last season."

=== New York Jets ===
==== 2016 season ====
On March 9, 2016, Forte signed a three-year, $12 million contract with the New York Jets. In his Jets debut, during their season-opening loss against the Cincinnati Bengals, Forte had 22 carries for 96 rushing yards and five catches for 59 receiving yards in the 23–22 loss. The following week, he finished a 37–31 victory over the Buffalo Bills with 30 carries for 100 yards and tied a career-high with three rushing touchdowns. On October 23, 2016, Forte carried the ball 30 times for 100 yards and a rushing touchdown while also making four receptions for 54 receiving yards and caught his first touchdown reception of the season in a win over the Baltimore Ravens. He was placed on injured reserve on December 30, 2016, with a knee injury. The 5–11 Jets frequently fell behind early in games, and Forte split rushing duties with Bilal Powell. He finished his first season as a Jet with a career-low 813 rushing yards with seven touchdowns to go along with 30 receptions for 263 yards and one touchdown.

==== 2017 season ====
Forte had a career-low 152 yards from scrimmage in his first three games before a toe injury sidelined him for two weeks, allowing Bilal Powell to emerge as a legitimate replacement. He did not have a game with 10 rushing attempts until Week 9, when he scored his first two touchdowns of the season in a 34–21 victory over the Buffalo Bills on Thursday Night Football. He was placed on injured reserve on December 30, 2017, after battling a knee injury for most of the season. On Christmas Eve, against the Los Angeles Chargers, he had 19 rushing yards and seven receiving yards in what would be his final professional game. Overall, he finished the 2017 season with 381 rushing yards, two rushing touchdowns, 37 receptions, 293 receiving yards, and one receiving touchdown.

=== Retirement ===
On February 28, 2018, Forte announced his retirement from the NFL after 10 seasons. The Chicago Bears honored both Forte and former teammate Devin Hester on April 23 during a press conference at Halas Hall. The two players signed ceremonial one-day contracts to retire as members of the Bears. Bears chairman George McCaskey praised Forte's legacy with the Bears, lauding the former running back as "a superior athlete and frequently the best player on the field — among the best in a long line of great Bears running backs."

Forte later joined NBC Sports Chicago's Football Aftershow as an analyst alongside Laurence Holmes and former teammates Alex Brown, Lance Briggs, and Olin Kreutz.

Forte was ranked 34th by the Chicago Bears on their list of the Top 100 greatest Bears of all-time.

Forte was inducted into the Louisiana Sports Hall of Fame in 2023.

== Career statistics ==
=== NFL ===
Year	Team	Games		Rushing					Receiving					2PT	Fumbles	
Year	Team	GP	GS	Att	Yds	Avg	Lng	TD	Rec	Yds	Avg	Lng	TD	2PT	Fum	Lost
2008	CHI	16	16	316	1,238	3.9	50T	8	63	477	7.6	19	4	0	1	1
2009	CHI	16	16	258	929	3.6	61	4	57	471	8.3	37	0	1	6	3
2010	CHI	16	16	237	1,069	4.5	68T	6	51	547	10.7	89T	3	1	3	2
2011	CHI	12	12	203	997	4.9	46	3	52	490	9.4	56T	1	0	2	2
2012	CHI	15	15	248	1,094	4.4	46	5	44	340	7.7	47	1	0	2	1
2013	CHI	16	16	289	1,339	4.6	55	9	74	594	8.0	34	3	1	2	2
2014	CHI	16	16	266	1,038	3.9	32	6	102	808	7.9	56	4	2	2	2
2015	CHI	13	13	218	898	4.1	27	4	44	389	8.8	38	3	1	2	1
2016	NYJ	14	13	218	813	3.7	32	7	30	263	8.8	40	1	0	1	1
2017	NYJ	12	4	103	381	3.7	20	2	37	293	7.9	34	1	0	1	1
Career		146	137	2,356	9,796	4.2	68	54	554	4,672	8.4	89	21	6	22	16

=== College ===
Year	School	Conf	Class	Pos	G	Rushing				Receiving			
Year	School	Conf	Class	Pos	G	Att	Yds	Avg	TD	Rec	Yds	Avg	TD
2004	Tulane	CUSA	FR	RB	11	140	624	4.5	4	20	180	9.0	2
2005	Tulane	CUSA	SO	RB	11	169	655	3.9	4	23	163	7.1	1
2006	Tulane	CUSA	JR	RB	9	163	859	5.3	8	28	360	12.9	2
2007	Tulane	CUSA	SR	RB	12	361	2,127	5.9	23	32	282	8.8	0
Career	Tulane					833	4,265	5.1	39	103	985	9.6	5

== Career highlights ==
=== Awards and honors ===
- 2× Pro Bowl (2011, 2013)
- PFWA All-Rookie Team (2008)
- PFR 2010's All-Decade Team
- 100 greatest Bears of All-Time
- NFC Offensive Player of the Week (Week 1, 2010)
- Diet Pepsi NFL Rookie of the Week (Week 12, 2008)
- Brian Piccolo Award (2014)
- 4× NFL Top 100 — 33rd (2012), 91st (2014), 48th (2015), 90th (2016)

College

- Conference USA All-Freshman (2004)
- 2× All-Conference USA (2005, 2007)
- Third-team AP All-American (2007)
- Doak Walker Award semifinalist (2007)
- Maxwell Award semifinalist (2007)
- Senior Bowl MVP (2008)

=== Bears franchise records ===
- Most rush attempts, rookie season (316)
- Most receptions, rookie season (63)
- Most yards from scrimmage, rookie season (1,715)
- Most receptions, postseason game (10, January 23, 2011, in the NFC Championship against the Green Bay Packers) (tied with Allen Robinson)
- Games with at least three touchdowns in a season (2 in 2013, tied with Gale Sayers, Walter Payton, and Neal Anderson)

== Personal life ==
Forte married Danielle Daniels in August 2011. The couple has three children: Nahla (born in 2013), Matthew Christian (born in 2015) and Nia (born in 2021). Forte and his family resided in Mettawa, Illinois, during his tenure with the Bears. His cousin is safety Andrew Adams.

Forte is a Christian and attends weekly team Bible studies and chapels. Forte has spoken about his faith saying, "When people look at me, I don't want them to just see football. I want my faith to speak for me and that it's about more than that. It's about reaching out to others and telling them about your faith."

Forte earned a degree in Finance from Tulane University in May 2009.

Forte took part in the 2008 Rookie Madden Bowl.
