= 2005 Conference USA Football Championship Game =

- Conference Championship
Tulsa Golden Hurricane	UCF Knights
(8–4)	(8–4)
44	27
Head coach: Steve Kragthorpe	Head coach: George O'Leary
	1	2	3	4	Total
Tulsa	14	17	10	3	44
UCF	7	20	0	0	27
- Date: December 3, 2005
- Season: 2005
- Stadium: Citrus Bowl
- Location: Orlando, Florida
- MVP: Garrett Mills (TE, Tulsa)
- Favorite: Tulsa by 3
- Referee: Randy Smith
- Attendance: 51,978

United States TV coverage
- Network: ESPN
- Announcers: Mark Jones (play-by-play), Chris Spielman (analyst) and Rob Stone (sideline)

2005 Conference USA football standings
	Conf.			Overall
Team	W		L	W		L
East Division
UCF x	7	–	1	8	–	5
Southern Miss	5	–	3	7	–	5
Memphis	5	–	3	7	–	5
East Carolina	4	–	4	5	–	6
Marshall	3	–	5	4	–	7
UAB	3	–	5	5	–	6
West Division
Tulsa x$	6	–	2	9	–	4
UTEP	5	–	3	8	–	4
Houston	4	–	4	6	–	6
SMU	4	–	4	5	–	6
Tulane	1	–	7	2	–	9
Rice	1	–	7	1	–	10
Championship: Tulsa 44, UCF 27
$ – Conference champion; x – Division champion/co-champions; Rankings from AP Poll

The 2005 Conference USA Football Championship Game was a college football game played on Saturday, December 3, 2005, at Citrus Bowl in Orlando. This was the 1st Conference USA Championship Game and determined the 2005 champion of the Conference USA. The game featured the UCF Golden Knights, champions of the East division, and the Tulsa Golden Hurricane, champions of the West division.

A UCF record home crowd of 51,978 saw the host team Golden Knights fall to visitors the Golden Hurricane by a score of 44–27.

== Teams ==
=== UCF ===
After going 0–11 in 2004, their final season in the MAC, and George O'Leary's first season as head coach, many did not expect much from UCF in its first C-USA season. They dropped their first two games (non-conference games), and stretched their active losing streak to 17 games - the longest active losing streak in the nation. The Golden Knights broke the streak by defeating Marshall for their first C-USA intra-conference victory. From there, UCF would go 7–1 in-conference (8–3 overall) and won the East Division. It was one of the best turnarounds in Division I-A history at the time (+8 wins), and they became the first team ever to go to a conference championship game the year after going winless.

=== Tulsa ===
The Golden Hurricane entered the game at 7–4 (6–2 in C-USA). They won five out of their last six games to clinch the C-USA West division, their first season as members of C-USA. Picked during the preseason to be a mid-pack team, Tulsa had also experienced fairly recent bad seasons of 1–10 (2001) and 1–11 (2002). Tight end Garrett Mills was a standout for the team during the season. He was on his way to an NCAA record 1,235 yards receiving (on 87 receptions), the most yards earned receiving by a tight end in a single season.

== Game summary ==
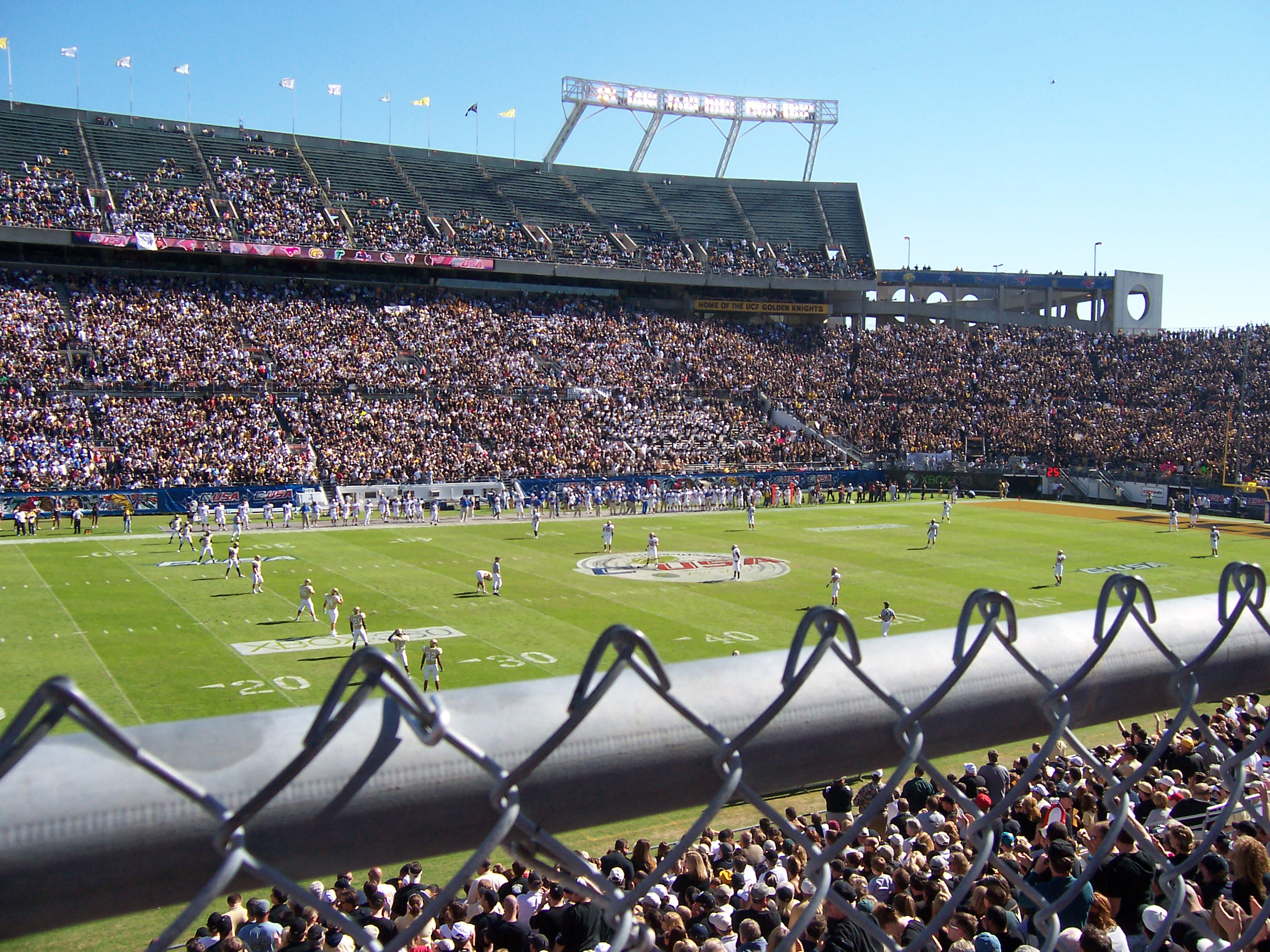
the 2005 C-USA Championship Game.

Quarterback Steven Moffett threw for 190 yards and 1 touchdown pass, but threw two interceptions and lost two fumbles in the game. On the opening drive, the Golden Knights drove 80 yards in 8 plays. Moffett connected to Willie Thornton for a 43-yard touchdown pass and an early 7–0 lead. Tulsa, however, scored 21 unanswered points. Nick Graham intercepted a Moffett pass and ran it 58 yards all the way down to the UCF 2 yard line. Uril Parrish's 2-yard dive gave Tulsa a 21–7 lead 13 seconds into the second quarter.

UCF got back in the game with a 7-play, 92-yard drive to start their second quarter. Kevin Smith, facing a 3rd & 1, broke free for a 31-yard touchdown run, trimming the deficit to 21–14. After a Matt Prater field goal, Joe Burnett's 68-yard punt return touchdown put the Golden Knights ahead 24–21. An excessive celebration penalty against UCF on the touchdown, however, gave Tulsa good field position. They scored on the drive to re-take the lead, then put up a field goal to go up 31–24. UCF got the ball back just before halftime. Prater kicked his second field goal of the game as time expired in the half. The Golden Hurricane led 31–27 at halftime.

Tulsa shutout UCF in the second half, and pulled away to a 44–27 victory. The Golden Hurricane accepted an invitation to the Liberty Bowl. With the loss, the Knights fell to 8–4 and accepted an invitation to the Hawaii Bowl.

== Game summary ==
2005 Conference USA Football Championship Game

Quarter	1	2	3	4	Total
Tulsa	14	17	10	3	44
UCF	7	20	0	0	27

at Citrus Bowl • Orlando, Florida

- Date: Saturday, December 3, 1005
- Game time: 12:00 p.m. EST
- Game attendance: 51,978
- TV: ESPN
- ESPN game summary

Game information

First quarter
Second quarter
Third quarter
Fourth quarter

=== Statistics ===
Statistics	TLSA	UCF
First downs	23	17
Plays–yards		
Rushes–yards		
Passing yards	219	221
Passing: comp–att–int	13–20–0	13–27–2
Time of possession	21:26	15:13

Team	Category	Player	Statistics
Tulsa	Passing	Paul Smith	
Tulsa	Rushing	Uril Parrish	
Tulsa	Receiving	Garrett Mills	
UCF	Passing	Steven Moffett	
UCF	Rushing	Kevin Smith	
UCF	Receiving	Brandon Marshall	
