= 2005 Memphis Tigers football team =

American college football season

2005 Memphis Tigers football

Motor City Bowl champion

Motor City Bowl, W 38–31 vs. Akron
- Conference: Conference USA
- East
- Record: 7–5 (5–3 C-USA)
- Head coach: Tommy West (5th season)
- Offensive coordinator: Randy Fichtner (5th season)
- Offensive scheme: Pro-style
- Defensive coordinator: Joe Lee Dunn (5th season)
- Base defense: 3–3–5
- Home stadium: Liberty Bowl Memorial Stadium

2005 Conference USA football standings
	Conf.			Overall
Team	W		L	W		L
East Division
UCF x	7	–	1	8	–	5
Southern Miss	5	–	3	7	–	5
Memphis	5	–	3	7	–	5
East Carolina	4	–	4	5	–	6
Marshall	3	–	5	4	–	7
UAB	3	–	5	5	–	6
West Division
Tulsa x$	6	–	2	9	–	4
UTEP	5	–	3	8	–	4
Houston	4	–	4	6	–	6
SMU	4	–	4	5	–	6
Tulane	1	–	7	2	–	9
Rice	1	–	7	1	–	10
Championship: Tulsa 44, UCF 27
$ – Conference champion; x – Division champion/co-champions; Rankings from AP Poll

The 2005 Memphis Tigers football team represented the University of Memphis in the 2005 NCAA Division I-A football season. Memphis competed as a member of the Conference USA. The team was led by head coach Tommy West. The Tigers played their home games at the Liberty Bowl Memorial Stadium.

== Schedule ==
Date	Time	Opponent	Site	TV	Result	Attendance	Source
September 5	3:30 pm	Ole Miss*	Liberty Bowl Memorial Stadium; Memphis, TN (rivalry)	ESPN	L 6–10	53,339	
September 17	7:00 pm	Chattanooga*	Liberty Bowl Memorial Stadium; Memphis, TN		W 59–14	30,772	
September 24	6:00 pm	at Tulsa	Skelly Stadium; Tulsa, OK	CSTV	L 31–37 ^{OT}	20,645	
October 1	7:30 pm	UTEP	Liberty Bowl Memorial Stadium; Memphis, TN	CSTV	W 27–20	30,053	
October 8	5:00 pm	at UCF	Florida Citrus Bowl; Orlando, FL	CSTV	L 17–38	20,562	
October 15	4:00 pm	at Houston	Robertson Stadium; Houston, TX	CSTV	W 35–20	12,800	
October 22	2:30 pm	East Carolina^{†}	Liberty Bowl Memorial Stadium; Memphis, TN	CSTV	W 27–24	31,710	
November 1	6:30 pm	UAB	Liberty Bowl Memorial Stadium; Memphis, TN (Battle for the Bones)	ESPN2	L 20–37	47,669	
November 12	1:00 pm	at Tennessee*	Neyland Stadium; Knoxville, TN	PPV	L 16–20	106,647	
November 19	7:30 pm	at Southern Miss	M. M. Roberts Stadium; Hattiesburg, MS (Black and Blue Bowl)	CSTV	W 24–22	25,667	
November 26	1:00 pm	Marshall	Liberty Bowl Memorial Stadium; Memphis, TN	CSTV	W 26–3	46,403	
December 26	3:00 pm	vs. Akron*	Ford Field; Detroit, MI (Motor City Bowl)	ESPN	W 38–31	50,616	
*Non-conference game; ^{†}Homecoming; All times are in Central time

== Team players in the 2006 NFL draft ==
Player	Position	Round	Pick	NFL club
DeAngelo Williams	Running back	1	27	Carolina Panthers
Stephen Gostkowski	Kicker	4	118	New England Patriots
