= 2005 Houston Cougars football team =

American college football season

2005 Houston Cougars football

Fort Worth Bowl, L 13–42 vs. Kansas
- Conference: Conference USA
- West Division
- Record: 6–6 (4–4 C-USA)
- Head coach: Art Briles (3rd season)
- Offensive scheme: Veer and shoot
- Defensive coordinator: Ron Harris (3rd season)
- Base defense: 4–3
- Captain: Game captains
- Home stadium: Robertson Stadium

2005 Conference USA football standings
	Conf.			Overall
Team	W		L	W		L
East Division
UCF x	7	–	1	8	–	5
Southern Miss	5	–	3	7	–	5
Memphis	5	–	3	7	–	5
East Carolina	4	–	4	5	–	6
Marshall	3	–	5	4	–	7
UAB	3	–	5	5	–	6
West Division
Tulsa x$	6	–	2	9	–	4
UTEP	5	–	3	8	–	4
Houston	4	–	4	6	–	6
SMU	4	–	4	5	–	6
Tulane	1	–	7	2	–	9
Rice	1	–	7	1	–	10
Championship: Tulsa 44, UCF 27
$ – Conference champion; x – Division champion/co-champions; Rankings from AP Poll

The 2005 Houston Cougars football team represented the University of Houston as a member of Conference USA (C-USA) during the 2005 NCAA Division I-A football season. Led by third-year head coach Art Briles, the Cougars compiled an overall record of 6–6 with a mark of 4–4 in conference play, tying for third place in C-USA's West Division. Houston was invited to the Fort Worth Bowl, where the Cougars lost to Kansas. The team played home games on campus, at Robertson Stadium in Houston.

== Schedule ==
Date	Time	Opponent	Site	TV	Result	Attendance
September 1	6:00 pm	Oregon*	Reliant Stadium; Houston, TX	ESPN2	L 24–38	19,981
September 10	6:00 pm	Sam Houston State*	Robertson Stadium; Houston, TX		W 31–10	15,649
September 16	7:00 pm	at UTEP	Sun Bowl; El Paso, TX	ESPN2	L 41–44 ^{2OT}	45,558
October 1	6:00 pm	at Tulsa	Skelly Stadium; Tulsa, OK		W 30–23	15,580
October 8	5:00 pm	at Tulane	Cajun Field; Lafayette, LA	iTV	W 35–14	15,454
October 15	4:00 pm	Memphis	Robertson Stadium; Houston, TX	CSTV	L 20–35	12,800
October 22	1:30 pm	at Mississippi State*	Davis Wade Stadium; Starkville, MS		W 28–16	40,957
November 5	5:00 pm	at UCF	Florida Citrus Bowl; Orlando, FL	iTV	L 29–31	32,635
November 13	4:00 pm	Southern Miss^{†}	Robertson Stadium; Houston, TX		W 27–24	15,119
November 19	5:00 pm	SMU	Robertson Stadium; Houston, TX (rivalry)		L 24–29	14,650
November 26	3:00 pm	Rice	Robertson Stadium; Houston, TX (rivalry)		W 35–18	12,125
December 23	7:00 pm	vs. Kansas*	Amon G. Carter Stadium; Fort Worth, TX (Fort Worth Bowl)	ESPN	L 13–42	33,505
*Non-conference game; ^{†}Homecoming; All times are in Central time

== Roster ==
2005 Houston Cougars football team roster
Players
Coaches
Offense

Pos.	#	Name	Class
WR	2	Donnie Avery	So
QB	4	Kevin Kolb	Jr

Defense

Pos.	#	Name	Class

Special teams

Pos.	#	Name	Class

Head coach

- Art Briles

Coordinators/assistant coaches

Legend

- (C) Team captain
- (S) Suspended
- (I) Ineligible
- Injured
- Redshirt

Roster
