= 2005 Rice Owls football team =

American college football season

2005 Rice Owls football
- Conference: Conference USA
- West
- Record: 1–10 (1–7 C-USA)
- Head coach: Ken Hatfield (12th season)
- Offensive coordinator: Scott Wachenheim (5th season)
- Offensive scheme: Triple option
- Defensive coordinator: Roger Hinshaw (8th season)
- Base defense: 3–4
- Home stadium: Rice Stadium

2005 Conference USA football standings
	Conf.			Overall
Team	W		L	W		L
East Division
UCF x	7	–	1	8	–	5
Southern Miss	5	–	3	7	–	5
Memphis	5	–	3	7	–	5
East Carolina	4	–	4	5	–	6
Marshall	3	–	5	4	–	7
UAB	3	–	5	5	–	6
West Division
Tulsa x$	6	–	2	9	–	4
UTEP	5	–	3	8	–	4
Houston	4	–	4	6	–	6
SMU	4	–	4	5	–	6
Tulane	1	–	7	2	–	9
Rice	1	–	7	1	–	10
Championship: Tulsa 44, UCF 27
$ – Conference champion; x – Division champion/co-champions; Rankings from AP Poll

The 2005 Rice Owls football team represented Rice University in the 2005 NCAA Division I-A college football season. The Owls were led by head coach Ken Hatfield, who resigned at the end of the season. They played their home games at Rice Stadium in Houston, Texas.

== Schedule ==
Date	Time	Opponent	Site	TV	Result	Attendance	Source
September 10	9:00 pm	at UCLA*	Rose Bowl; Pasadena, CA	FSN	L 21–63	44,808	
September 17	6:00 pm	at No. 2 Texas*	Darrell K Royal–Texas Memorial Stadium; Austin, TX	FSN	L 10–51	83,055	
October 1	6:00 pm	at UAB	Legion Field; Birmingham, AL		L 26–45	10,580	
October 8	5:00 pm	at East Carolina	Dowdy–Ficklen Stadium; Greenville, NC		L 28–41	33,213	
October 15	3:00 pm	Tulsa	Rice Stadium; Houston, TX		L 21–41	10,893	
October 22	5:00 pm	Navy*	Rice Stadium; Houston, TX		L 9–41	12,714	
October 29	5:00 pm	UTEP	Rice Stadium; Houston, TX	iTV	L 31–38	9,326	
November 5	2:00 pm	at SMU	Gerald J. Ford Stadium; Dallas, TX (rivalry)	CSTV	L 7–27	15,236	
November 12	2:00 pm	Tulane^{†}	Rice Stadium; Houston, TX		W 42–34	9,162	
November 19	2:00 pm	UCF	Rice Stadium; Houston, TX		L 28–31	8,267	
November 26	3:00 pm	at Houston	Robertson Stadium; Houston, TX (rivalry)	CSTV	L 18–35	12,125	
*Non-conference game; ^{†}Homecoming; Rankings from AP Poll released prior to the game; All times are in Central time
