= 2005 UAB Blazers football team =

American college football season

2005 UAB Blazers football
- Conference: Conference USA
- East Division
- Record: 5–6 (3–5 C-USA)
- Head coach: Watson Brown (11th season)
- Offensive coordinator: Pat Sullivan (7th season)
- Offensive scheme: Multiple
- Defensive coordinator: Wayne Bolt (3rd season)
- Base defense: 4–3
- Home stadium: Legion Field

2005 Conference USA football standings
	Conf.			Overall
Team	W		L	W		L
East Division
UCF x	7	–	1	8	–	5
Southern Miss	5	–	3	7	–	5
Memphis	5	–	3	7	–	5
East Carolina	4	–	4	5	–	6
Marshall	3	–	5	4	–	7
UAB	3	–	5	5	–	6
West Division
Tulsa x$	6	–	2	9	–	4
UTEP	5	–	3	8	–	4
Houston	4	–	4	6	–	6
SMU	4	–	4	5	–	6
Tulane	1	–	7	2	–	9
Rice	1	–	7	1	–	10
Championship: Tulsa 44, UCF 27
$ – Conference champion; x – Division champion/co-champions; Rankings from AP Poll

The 2005 UAB Blazers football team represented the University of Alabama at Birmingham (UAB) as a member of the East Division in Conference USA (C-USA) during the 2005 NCAA Division I-A football season. Led by 11th-year head coach Watson Brown, the Blazers compiled an overall record of 5–6 with a mark of 3–5 in conference play, tying for fifth place at the bottom of the standings in C-USA's East Division. The team played home games at Legion Field in Birmingham, Alabama.

== Schedule ==
Date	Time	Opponent	Site	TV	Result	Attendance	Source
September 3	11:30 a.m.	at No. 3 Tennessee*	Neyland Stadium; Knoxville, TN	JP Sports	L 10–17	107,529	
September 10	7:00 p.m.	at Troy*	Movie Gallery Stadium; Troy, AL		W 27–7	22,299	
September 17	6:00 p.m.	Jacksonville State*	Legion Field; Birmingham, AL		W 35–28	23,109	
October 1	6:00 p.m.	Rice	Legion Field; Birmingham, AL		W 45–26	10,580	
October 8	6:00 p.m.	SMU^{†}	Legion Field; Birmingham, AL		L 27–28	23,255	
October 15	4:00 p.m.	at Marshall	Joan C. Edwards Stadium; Huntington, WV		L 19–20	27,182	
October 21	7:00 p.m.	Southern Miss	Legion Field; Birmingham, AL	ESPN	L 28–37	31,363	
November 1	6:30 p.m.	at Memphis	Liberty Bowl Memorial Stadium; Memphis, TN (Battle for the Bones)	ESPN2	W 37–20	47,669	
November 12	3:00 p.m.	UCF	Legion Field; Birmingham, AL	CSTV	L 21–27	12,199	
November 19	5:05 p.m.	at No. 24 UTEP	Sun Bowl; El Paso, TX		W 35–23	47,967	
November 26	11:00 a.m.	at East Carolina	Dowdy–Ficklen Stadium; Greenville, NC		L 23–31	26,990	
*Non-conference game; ^{†}Homecoming; Rankings from AP Poll released prior to the game; All times are in Central time
