= 2005 Motor City Bowl =

Akron Zips	Memphis Tigers
(7–5)	(6–5)
MAC	C-USA
31	38
Head coach: J.D. Brookhart	Head coach: Tommy West
	1	2	3	4	Total
Akron	3	0	7	21	31
Memphis	0	13	7	18	38
- Date: December 26, 2005
- Season: 2005
- Stadium: Ford Field
- Location: Detroit, Michigan
- MVP: Memphis RB DeAngelo Williams
- Referee: Jack Folliard (Pac-10)
- Attendance: 50,616

United States TV coverage
- Network: ESPN
- Announcers: Mark Jones (Play by Play); Chris Spielman (Analyst); Rob Stone (Sideline)

The 2005 Motor City Bowl, part of the 2005–06 NCAA football bowl games season, occurred on December 27, 2005, at Ford Field in Detroit, Michigan. The Memphis Tigers beat the Akron Zips 38–31.

This game is most noteworthy for being the first FBS bowl game the University of Akron Zips football team has played in, and for being the final college game for All-American and All-Pro running back DeAngelo Williams. Williams was named the Game MVP.
