= 2005 SMU Mustangs football team =

American college football season

2005 SMU Mustangs football
- Conference: Conference USA
- West Division
- Record: 5–6 (4–4 C-USA)
- Head coach: Phil Bennett (4th season)
- Offensive coordinator: Rusty Burns (2nd season)
- Offensive scheme: Spread
- Defensive coordinator: Jim Gush (4th season)
- Base defense: 4–3
- Home stadium: Gerald J. Ford Stadium

2005 Conference USA football standings
	Conf.			Overall
Team	W		L	W		L
East Division
UCF x	7	–	1	8	–	5
Southern Miss	5	–	3	7	–	5
Memphis	5	–	3	7	–	5
East Carolina	4	–	4	5	–	6
Marshall	3	–	5	4	–	7
UAB	3	–	5	5	–	6
West Division
Tulsa x$	6	–	2	9	–	4
UTEP	5	–	3	8	–	4
Houston	4	–	4	6	–	6
SMU	4	–	4	5	–	6
Tulane	1	–	7	2	–	9
Rice	1	–	7	1	–	10
Championship: Tulsa 44, UCF 27
$ – Conference champion; x – Division champion/co-champions; Rankings from AP Poll

The 2005 SMU Mustangs football team represented Southern Methodist University (SMU) as a member the West Division of Conference USA (C-USA) during the 2005 NCAA Division I-A football season. Led by fourth-year head coach Phil Bennett, the Mustangs compiled an overall record of 5–6 with a mark of 4–4 in conference play, tying for third place in C-USA's West Division.

== Schedule ==
Date	Time	Opponent	Site	TV	Result	Attendance	Source
September 3	7:00 p.m.	Baylor*	Gerald J. Ford Stadium; University Park, TX		L 23–28	29,538	
September 10	8:30 p.m.	No. 22 TCU*	Gerald J. Ford Stadium; University Park, TX (rivalry)	CSTV	W 21–10	22,416	
September 17	11:30 a.m.	at Texas A&M*	Kyle Field; College Station, TX	FSN	L 8–66	75,128	
September 24	1:00 p.m.	Tulane	Gerald J. Ford Stadium; University Park, TX		L 10–31	15,681	
October 1	3:00 p.m.	at Marshall	Joan C. Edwards Stadium; Huntington, WV	CSTV	L 13–16	25,218	
October 8	6:00 p.m.	at UAB	Legion Field; Birmingham, AL		W 28–27	23,255	
October 15	2:00 p.m.	East Carolina	Gerald J. Ford Stadium; University Park, TX		L 17–24	11,715	
October 22	2:00 p.m.	at Tulsa	Skelly Stadium; Tulsa, OK		L 13–20	22,502	
November 5	2:00 p.m.	Rice^{†}	Gerald J. Ford Stadium; University Park, TX (rivalry)		W 27–7	15,236	
November 19	5:00 p.m.	at Houston	Robertson Stadium; Houston, TX (rivalry)		W 29–24	14,650	
November 26	2:00 p.m.	UTEP	Gerald J. Ford Stadium; University Park, TX		W 40–27	17,194	
*Non-conference game; ^{†}Homecoming; Rankings from AP Poll released prior to the game; All times are in Central time

== Roster ==
2005 SMU Mustangs football team roster
Players
Coaches
Offense

Pos.	#	Name	Class
QB	13	Jerad Romo	Sr
WR	17	Emmanuel Sanders	Fr

Defense

Pos.	#	Name	Class
SS	27	Alvin Nnabuife	Sr
DE	40	Justin Rogers	Jr

Special teams

Pos.	#	Name	Class
P	41	Ryan Mentzel	Sr

Head coach

- Phil Bennett

Coordinators/assistant coaches

Legend

- (C) Team captain
- (S) Suspended
- (I) Ineligible
- Injured
- Redshirt

Roster
Last update: 2005-12-15
