= 2005 Fort Worth Bowl =

Kansas Jayhawks	Houston Cougars
(6–5)	(6–5)
Big 12	C-USA
42	13
Head coach: Mark Mangino	Head coach: Art Briles
	1	2	3	4	Total
Kansas	7	7	14	14	42
Houston	0	10	3	0	13
- Date: December 23, 2005
- Season: 2005
- Stadium: Amon G. Carter Stadium
- Location: Fort Worth, Texas
- MVP: Jason Swanson (QB, Kansas) & Kevin Kolb (QB, Houston)
- Favorite: Kansas by 3
- Referee: Tom Zimorski (ACC)
- Attendance: 33,505
- Payout: US$750,000

United States TV coverage
- Network: ESPN
- Announcers: Gary Thorne (play-by-play); Ed Cunningham (color); Dr. Jerry Punch (sideline)

The 2005 edition of the Fort Worth Bowl (later known as the Armed Forces Bowl), the third edition, featured the Kansas Jayhawks and the Houston Cougars.

== Game summary ==
Brian Murph of Kansas scored the first points of the game on an 85-yard touchdown return of a punt to give Kansas an early 7–0 lead. Houston's Ben Bell answered in the second quarter with a 32-yard field goal making it 7–3. Kansas quarterback Jason Swanson fired a 13-yard touchdown pass to Jon Cornish making it 14–3 Kansas. With 57 seconds left in the first half, Houston quarterback Kevin Kolb scored on a 1-yard touchdown run bringing it to 14–10 at halftime.

In the third quarter, Jason Swanson again found Jon Cornish for a 30-yard touchdown pass, increasing Kansas's lead to 21–10. T.J. Lawrence of Houston kicked a 44-yard field goal for Houston to make it 21–13. Jason Swanson later threw a 32-yard touchdown pass to Mark Simmons, giving Kansas a 28–13 lead.

In the fourth quarter, defensive end Charlton Keith intercepted a Houston pass and returned it 14 yards for a touchdown, making it 35–13. Jason Swanson's 48-yard touchdown pass to Brian Murph capped the scoring at 42–13 Kansas.
