= 2005 East Carolina Pirates football team =

American college football season

2005 East Carolina Pirates football
- Conference: Conference USA
- East
- Record: 5–6 (4–4 C-USA)
- Head coach: Skip Holtz (1st season)
- Offensive coordinator: Steve Shankweiler (1st season)
- Offensive scheme: Multiple
- Defensive coordinator: Greg Hudson (1st season)
- Base defense: 4–3
- Home stadium: Dowdy–Ficklen Stadium

2005 Conference USA football standings
	Conf.			Overall
Team	W		L	W		L
East Division
UCF x	7	–	1	8	–	5
Southern Miss	5	–	3	7	–	5
Memphis	5	–	3	7	–	5
East Carolina	4	–	4	5	–	6
Marshall	3	–	5	4	–	7
UAB	3	–	5	5	–	6
West Division
Tulsa x$	6	–	2	9	–	4
UTEP	5	–	3	8	–	4
Houston	4	–	4	6	–	6
SMU	4	–	4	5	–	6
Tulane	1	–	7	2	–	9
Rice	1	–	7	1	–	10
Championship: Tulsa 44, UCF 27
$ – Conference champion; x – Division champion/co-champions; Rankings from AP Poll

The 2005 East Carolina Pirates football team was an American football team that represented East Carolina University as a member of Conference USA during the 2005 NCAA Division I-A football season. In their first season under head coach Skip Holtz, the team compiled a 5–6 record.

== Schedule ==
Date	Time	Opponent	Site	TV	Result	Attendance	Source
September 3	1:00 pm	Duke*	Dowdy–Ficklen Stadium; Greenville, NC	CSTV	W 24–21	35,107	
September 17	6:30 pm	at Wake Forest*	Groves Stadium; Winston-Salem, NC		L 34–44	29,563	
September 24	12:00 pm	at West Virginia*	Milan Puskar Stadium; Morgantown, WV	ESPN Plus	L 15–20	57,295	
October 1	6:00 pm	Southern Miss	Dowdy–Ficklen Stadium; Greenville, NC		L 7–33	35,510	
October 8	6:00 pm	Rice	Dowdy–Ficklen Stadium; Greenville, NC		W 41–28	33,213	
October 15	3:00 pm	at SMU	Gerald J. Ford Stadium; University Park, TX		W 24–17	11,715	
October 22	3:30 pm	at Memphis	Liberty Bowl Memorial Stadium; Memphis, TN	CSTV	L 24–27	31,710	
October 29	2:00 pm	UCF^{†}	Dowdy–Ficklen Stadium; Greenville, NC		L 20–30	34,410	
November 12	3:00 pm	at Tulsa	Skelly Stadium; Tulsa, OK		L 13–45	21,996	
November 19	4:30 pm	at Marshall	Joan C. Edwards Stadium; Huntington, WV (rivalry)		W 34–29	22,408	
November 26	12:00 pm	UAB	Dowdy–Ficklen Stadium; Greenville, NC		W 31–23	26,990	
*Non-conference game; ^{†}Homecoming; All times are in Eastern time
