= 2008 Senior Bowl =

2008 Under Armour Senior Bowl
- 59th Senior Bowl
| North Team | South Team |
| 16 | 17 |
| Head coach: Lane Kiffin (Oakland Raiders) | Head coach: Mike Nolan (San Francisco 49ers) |
| | 1 | 2 | 3 | 4 | Total |
|---|---|---|---|---|---|
| North | 7 | 0 | 2 | 7 | 16 |
| South | 0 | 7 | 0 | 10 | 17 |
- Date: January 26, 2008
- Season: 2007
- Stadium: Ladd–Peebles Stadium
- Location: Mobile, Alabama
- MVP: Matt Forte

United States TV coverage
- Network: NFL Network
- Announcers: Rich Eisen, Brian Baldinger, Jeanne Zelasko, Krista Voda

The 2008 Senior Bowl was a college football exhibition game featuring players from the 2007 college football season and prospects in the 2008 NFL draft. The 59th edition of the Senior Bowl was played on January 26, 2008, at 3 p.m. EST at Ladd–Peebles Stadium in Mobile, Alabama. Coverage of the event was on high-definition on the NFL Network during January 21–26. Clothing company Under Armour sponsored the event for the second consecutive year, and provided apparel for the game, including "newly-designed, state-of-the-art game jerseys." The South team won, 17–16.

== Coaching staffs ==
=== North ===
With the worst record (1–15) during the 2007 NFL season, the Miami Dolphins were originally slated to coach the North squad. However, after all but two members of the coaching staff were fired the Dolphins became ineligible for the duties. They were replaced by head coach Lane Kiffin and the Oakland Raiders, who went 4–12 in 2007.

=== South ===
San Francisco 49ers head coach Mike Nolan and his staff coached the South squad for the third consecutive year after going 5–11 in 2007.
