= 2005 UTEP Miners football team =

American college football season

2005 UTEP Miners football

GMAC Bowl, L 13–45 vs. Toledo
- Conference: Conference USA
- West Division
- Record: 8–4 (5–3 C-USA)
- Head coach: Mike Price (2nd season)
- Offensive coordinator: Eric Price (2nd season)
- Offensive scheme: Spread
- Defensive coordinator: Tim Hundley (2nd season)
- Base defense: Multiple
- Home stadium: Sun Bowl

2005 Conference USA football standings
	Conf.			Overall
Team	W		L	W		L
East Division
UCF x	7	–	1	8	–	5
Southern Miss	5	–	3	7	–	5
Memphis	5	–	3	7	–	5
East Carolina	4	–	4	5	–	6
Marshall	3	–	5	4	–	7
UAB	3	–	5	5	–	6
West Division
Tulsa x$	6	–	2	9	–	4
UTEP	5	–	3	8	–	4
Houston	4	–	4	6	–	6
SMU	4	–	4	5	–	6
Tulane	1	–	7	2	–	9
Rice	1	–	7	1	–	10
Championship: Tulsa 44, UCF 27
$ – Conference champion; x – Division champion/co-champions; Rankings from AP Poll

The 2005 UTEP Miners football team represented the University of Texas at El Paso (UTEP) as a member of the West Division in Conference USA (C-USA) during the 2005 NCAA Division I-A football season. Led by second-year head coach Mike Price, the Miners compiled an overall record of 8–4 with a mark of 5–3 in conference play, placing second in the C-USA's West Division. UTEP was invited to the GMAC Bowl, where the Miners lost to Toledo. The team played home games at the Sun Bowl in El Paso, Texas.

This was UTEP's first season competing in Conference USA, having moved from the Western Athletic Conference (WAC). The Miners averaged 47,899 fans per game, ranking 44th nationally.

== Schedule ==
Date	Time	Opponent	Rank	Site	TV	Result	Attendance	Source
September 3	8:30 pm	New Mexico State*		Aggie Memorial Stadium; Las Cruces, NM (Battle of I-10)	ESPNU	W 34–17	30,343	
September 16	6:00 pm	Houston		Sun Bowl; El Paso, TX	ESPN2	W 44–41 ^{2OT}	45,558	
September 24	7:05 pm	New Mexico*		Sun Bowl; El Paso, TX	CSTV	W 21–13	50,425	
October 1	6:00 pm	at Memphis		Liberty Bowl Memorial Stadium; Memphis, TN	CSTV	L 20–27	30,053	
October 14	6:00 pm	at Tulane		Joe Aillet Stadium; Ruston, LA	ESPN	W 45–21	13,153	
October 22	7:05 pm	Marshall^{†}		Sun Bowl; El Paso, TX	iTV	W 31–3	51,500	
October 29	4:00 pm	at Rice		Rice Stadium; Houston, TX	iTV	W 38–31	9,326	
November 5	7:05 pm	Tulsa		Sun Bowl; El Paso, TX	iTV	W 41–38	49,160	
November 12	7:05 pm	Texas Southern*		Sun Bowl; El Paso, TX		W 45–0	42,784	
November 19	4:15 pm	UAB	No. 24	Sun Bowl; El Paso, TX	iTV	L 23–35	47,967	
November 26	1:00 pm	at SMU		Gerald J. Ford Stadium; Dallas, TX		L 27–40	17,194	
December 21	6:00 pm	vs. Toledo*		Ladd–Peebles Stadium; Mobile, AL (GMAC Bowl)	ESPN	L 13–45	35,422	
*Non-conference game; ^{†}Homecoming; Rankings from AP Poll released prior to the game; All times are in Mountain time
