= 2005 Liberty Bowl =

2005 AutoZone Liberty Bowl
- 47th Liberty Bowl
Fresno State Bulldogs	Tulsa Golden Hurricane
(8–4)	(8–4)
WAC	C-USA
24	31
Head coach: Pat Hill	Head coach: Steve Kragthorpe
	1	2	3	4	Total
Fresno State	7	7	3	7	24
Tulsa	0	17	0	14	31
- Date: December 31, 2005
- Season: 2005
- Stadium: Liberty Bowl Memorial Stadium
- Location: Memphis, Tennessee
- MVP: Paul Smith (QB, Tulsa)
- Referee: Tom Ritter (SEC)
- Attendance: 54,894
- Payout: US$1.5 million

United States TV coverage
- Network: ESPN
- Announcers: Gary Bender, Bill Curry

The 2005 Liberty Bowl was a post-season college football bowl game between the Fresno State Bulldogs and the Tulsa Golden Hurricane played on December 31, 2005, at Liberty Bowl Memorial Stadium in Memphis, Tennessee. In a closely contested game that went back and forth, Tulsa defeated Fresno State, 31–24. It was the 47th time the Liberty Bowl had been played, and was the final game of the 2005 NCAA Division I-A football season for both teams. With sponsorship from AutoZone, the game was officially the AutoZone Liberty Bowl.

The game between Fresno State from the Western Athletic Conference (WAC) and the Conference USA (C-USA) champion Tulsa was played at neutral-site Liberty Bowl Memorial Stadium (Tulsa was once a WAC member, but joined C-USA in 2005). Tulsa automatically qualified for the Liberty Bowl after defeating Central Florida in the C-USA Championship Game. Normally, Tulsa would have faced TCU, the Mountain West Conference champion, but the Liberty Bowl's tie-in with the Mountain West had ended after 2004 and TCU opted for the Houston Bowl. Instead, the bowl organizers invited Fresno State. Fresno's invite came on November 23, 2005, just days after it lost to the then-No. 1 USC Trojans, 50–42. This was Fresno State's first appearance in a bowl game east of the Mississippi River.

== Game summary ==
Early in the first quarter Fresno State put together a long drive, going 54 yards in 15 plays. All but two of these plays were rushes, and none of the plays went for more than 8 yards. On the last play of the drive Fresno State faced 4th and 2 on Tulsa's 10-yard line but failed to convert, coming up empty-handed after eight minutes and 27 seconds. Tulsa was unable to capitalize on the stop and punted the ball away. Starting now from their own 46, Fresno State again drove 54 yards, this time with six plays in just under three minutes. Wendell Mathis ran the ball four times, finally scoring a touchdown on a 6-yard run putting Fresno State up 7-0.

Tulsa came right back after Fresno State's score, moving the ball 74 yards in 3:20. The centerpiece of the drive was 22-yard touchdown run by Uril Parrish, tying the score at 7 early in the second quarter. Tulsa scored again at 8:15 on a 64-yard run by Tarrion Adams, which tied his season high against Memphis and put Tulsa up 14-7. Fresno State responded with another of its long drives, a 14-play 79-yarder capped by a 22-yard touchdown run by Bryson Sumlin, which tied the game at 14 with 1:13 left in the half. Tulsa, starting from its own 19, quickly moved the ball to Fresno State's 23-yard line, setting up a 41-yard field goal by Brad DeVault to end the half.

Fresno State started the third quarter with a 36-yard kickoff return by Adam Jennings followed by a 24-yard run by Mathis placing them at Tulsa's 35-yard line. Quarterback Paul Pinegar completed a 20-yard pass to Jaron Fairman, putting them on Tulsa's 15. After this strong start, however, Fresno State could not convert and settled for a 27-yard field goal by Kyle Zimmerman, rather than risk the possibility of turning it over on downs as they had in the opening drive of the first quarter. The field goal tied the game at 17. The remainder of the third quarter was marked by missed opportunities and miscues. Fresno State kicker Zimmerman missed a 26-yard field goal. Tulsa QB Smith completed a 25-yard pass to Davis deep inside Fresno State territory, but Davis fumbled the ball. Fresno State took over, but QB Pinegar fumbled and recovered the ball on a 9-yard sack. The quarter ended at a 17-17 tie.

To begin the fourth quarter Fresno State continued the drive which had begun on the Tulsa turnover, and scored less than a minute in on a 21-yard touchdown pass from Pinegar to Joe Fernandez, putting Fresno State up 24-17. After two inconclusive drives Tulsa scored on a 54-yard touchdown pass from Smith to Davis, tying the game at 24. Tulsa scored again late in the quarter on a 4-yard run by Smith, putting them up 31-24, while Fresno State's efforts were frustrated by two interceptions thrown by Pinegar, the second coming on Tulsa's 32-yard line with two minutes left in the game. Taking possession, Tulsa was able to run out the clock, winning 31-24.

=== Scoring summary ===
Scoring summary

Quarter	Time	Drive			Team	Scoring information	Score	
Quarter	Time	Plays	Yards	TOP	Team	Scoring information	FRES	TLSA
1	1:00		54	2:44	FRES	Wendell Mathis 6-yard touchdown run, Kyle Zimmerman kick good	7	0
2	12:33		74	3:20	TLSA	Uril Parrish 22-yard touchdown run, Brad DeVault kick good	7	7
2	8:15		79	2:07	TLSA	Tarrion Adams 63-yard touchdown run, Devault kick good	14	7
2	1:13		79	6:56	FRES	Bryson Sumlin 25-yard touchdown run, Zimmerman kick good	14	14
2	0:00		59	1:08	TLSA	41-yard field goal by DeVault	14	17
3	11:51		49	3:03	FRES	27-yard field goal by Zimmerman	17	17
4	14:12		72	5:30	FRES	Joe Fernandez 21-yard touchdown reception from Paul Pinegar, Zimmerman kick good	24	17
4	10:35		67	0:30	TLSA	Ashlan Davis 54-yard touchdown reception from Paul Smith, DeVault kick good	24	24
4	2:55		52	4:01	TLSA	Smith 4-yard touchdown run, DeVault kick good	24	31
"TOP" = time of possession. For other American football terms, see Glossary of American football.							24	31

== Aftermath ==
Until Nov. 19, it went very well. At the end, it didn't go very well. We had a very, very good season going and we didn't finish the way we wanted to. But I'm not going to take anything away from this football team. We played at a very high level in many games this year, and it was never from lack of effort.

— Fresno State coach Pat Hill, after the loss to Tulsa.

Tulsa quarterback Paul Smith was named the bowl MVP. His 4-yard touchdown run proved the difference in the game and gave Tulsa its first bowl victory since 1991 Freedom Bowl, 14 years ago. The loss ended a three-year bowl winning streak for Fresno State, and frustrated Fresno State quarterback Paul Pinegar's attempt to be the first QB to go 4-0 in bowl games.

Several National Football League teams interviewed Fresno State coach Pat Hill during the off-season, but he elected to remain with Fresno State and received a contract extension through the end of 2010.

Tulsa head coach Steve Kragthorpe remained at Tulsa for one more season before departing to coach the University of Louisville. Immediately after the win defensive coordinator Todd Graham departed to become head coach at Rice. Just one year later Graham would return to Tulsa as head coach following Kragthorpe's departure.

The 2005 Liberty Bowl is the only edition to feature the Conference USA champion and a Western Athletic Conference team. Beginning with the 2006 Liberty Bowl, the Conference USA champion faced a team from the Southeastern Conference (SEC).
