= 2005 Tulsa Golden Hurricane football team =

American college football season

2005 Tulsa Golden Hurricane football

C-USA champion C-USA West Division champion Liberty Bowl champion

Conference USA Championship Game, W 44–27 vs. UCF

Liberty Bowl, W 31–24 vs. Fresno State
- Conference: Conference USA
- West Division
- Record: 9–4 (6–2 C-USA)
- Head coach: Steve Kragthorpe (3rd season)
- Offensive coordinator: Charlie Stubbs (3rd season)
- Offensive scheme: Multiple
- Defensive coordinator: Todd Graham (3rd season)
- Base defense: 3–3–5
- Home stadium: Skelly Stadium

2005 Conference USA football standings
	Conf.			Overall
Team	W		L	W		L
East Division
UCF x	7	–	1	8	–	5
Southern Miss	5	–	3	7	–	5
Memphis	5	–	3	7	–	5
East Carolina	4	–	4	5	–	6
Marshall	3	–	5	4	–	7
UAB	3	–	5	5	–	6
West Division
Tulsa x$	6	–	2	9	–	4
UTEP	5	–	3	8	–	4
Houston	4	–	4	6	–	6
SMU	4	–	4	5	–	6
Tulane	1	–	7	2	–	9
Rice	1	–	7	1	–	10
Championship: Tulsa 44, UCF 27
$ – Conference champion; x – Division champion/co-champions; Rankings from AP Poll

The 2005 Tulsa Golden Hurricane football team represented the University of Tulsa in the 2005 NCAA Division I-A football season. The team's head coach was Steve Kragthorpe. They played home games at Skelly Stadium in Tulsa, Oklahoma and competed in the West Division of Conference USA.

== Schedule ==
Date	Time	Opponent	Site	TV	Result	Attendance	Source
September 1	9:15 pm	Minnesota*	Skelly Stadium; Tulsa, OK	ESPN2	L 10–41	33,410	
September 10	11:30 am	at No. 18 Oklahoma*	Gaylord Family Oklahoma Memorial Stadium; Norman, OK	FSN	L 15–31	83,877	
September 17	6:00 pm	at North Texas*	Fouts Field; Denton, TX		W 54–2	23,112	
September 24	6:00 pm	Memphis^{†}	Skelly Stadium; Tulsa, OK		W 37–31 ^{OT}	20,645	
October 1	6:00 pm	Houston	Skelly Stadium; Tulsa, OK		L 23–30	15,580	
October 8	7:00 pm	at Southern Miss	M. M. Roberts Stadium; Hattiesburg, MS	CSTV	W 34–17	28,375	
October 15	3:00 pm	at Rice	Rice Stadium; Houston, TX	iTV	W 41–21	10,893	
October 22	2:00 pm	SMU	Skelly Stadium; Tulsa, OK	iTV	W 20–13	22,502	
November 5	8:05 pm	at UTEP	Sun Bowl Stadium; El Paso, TX	iTV	L 38–41	49,160	
November 12	2:00 pm	East Carolina	Skelly Stadium; Tulsa, OK	iTV	W 45–13	21,995	
November 19	1:00 pm	Tulane	Malone Stadium; Monroe, LA	iTV	W 38–14	10,306	
December 3	11:00 am	at UCF	Florida Citrus Bowl; Orlando, FL (Conference USA Championship Game)	ESPN	W 44–27	51,978	
December 31	1:00 pm	vs. Fresno State*	Liberty Bowl Memorial Stadium; Memphis, TN (Liberty Bowl)	ESPN	W 31–24	54,894	
*Non-conference game; ^{†}Homecoming; Rankings from AP Poll released prior to the game; All times are in Central time

== After the season ==
=== 2006 NFL draft ===
The following Golden Hurricane player was selected in the 2006 NFL draft following the season.

Round	Pick	Player	Position	NFL club
4	106	Garrett Mills	Gridiron	New England Patriots
