= 2005 New Orleans Bowl =

- at Lafayette
Southern Miss Golden Eagles	Arkansas State Indians
(6–5)	(6–5)
C-USA	Sun Belt
31	19
Head coach: Jeff Bower	Head coach: Steve Roberts
	1	2	3	4	Total
Southern Miss	0	10	14	7	31
Arkansas State	0	10	9	0	19
- Date: December 20, 2005
- Season: 2005
- Stadium: Cajun Field
- Location: Lafayette, Louisiana
- MVP: Southern Miss TE Shawn Nelson
- Referee: John Smith (Big East)
- Attendance: 18,338
- Payout: US$750,000 per team

United States TV coverage
- Network: ESPN
- Announcers: Mark Jones, Chris Spielman, Rob Stone

The 2005 New Orleans Bowl, dubbed the New Orleans Bowl at Lafayette featured the Arkansas State Indians (now the Red Wolves) and the Southern Miss Golden Eagles. Due to the destruction caused by Hurricane Katrina, the game was played at Cajun Field in Lafayette, Louisiana, instead of at the Louisiana Superdome in New Orleans.

For Arkansas State, the game represented the Indians' first bowl game since the 1970 Pecan Bowl. The team had won the Sun Belt Conference with a 6–5 record. Meanwhile, the Southern Miss Golden Eagles (representing Conference USA) also came in with a 6–5 record.

== Game summary ==
Darren McCaleb got Southern Miss on the board first with a 31-yard field goal to give USM an early 3–0 lead. Arkansas State's Eric Neihouse answered with a 44-yard field goal to tie the game at 3–3. With 2:05 left in the first quarter, running back Cole Mason scored on a 5-yard touchdown run to give Southern Miss a 10–3 lead. Nick Noce answered with a 4-yard touchdown run to tie the game at 10 at halftime.

Cody Hull scored on a 1-yard touchdown run in the 3rd quarter, to give Southern Miss a 17–10 lead. Quarterback Nick Noce found wide receiver Manuel Burton in the end zone for a touchdown to tie the game at 17–17. USM quarterback Dustin Almond connected with wide receiver Shawn Nelson for a 29-yard touchdown pass and a 24–17 lead. Arkansas State scored on a safety to get within 24–19. Dustin Almond threw a second touchdown pass to Shawn Nelson to make the final margin 31–19.
