= 2005 Marshall Thundering Herd football team =

American college football season

2005 Marshall Thundering Herd football
- Conference: Conference USA
- East Division
- Record: 4–7 (3–5 C-USA)
- Head coach: Mark Snyder (1st season)
- Offensive coordinator: Larry Kueck (5th season)
- Defensive coordinator: Jim Collins (1st season)
- Captains: Wilbur Hargrove; Jeff Mullins; Chris Royal; Willie Smith
- Home stadium: Joan C. Edwards Stadium

2005 Conference USA football standings
	Conf.			Overall
Team	W		L	W		L
East Division
UCF x	7	–	1	8	–	5
Southern Miss	5	–	3	7	–	5
Memphis	5	–	3	7	–	5
East Carolina	4	–	4	5	–	6
Marshall	3	–	5	4	–	7
UAB	3	–	5	5	–	6
West Division
Tulsa x$	6	–	2	9	–	4
UTEP	5	–	3	8	–	4
Houston	4	–	4	6	–	6
SMU	4	–	4	5	–	6
Tulane	1	–	7	2	–	9
Rice	1	–	7	1	–	10
Championship: Tulsa 44, UCF 27
$ – Conference champion; x – Division champion/co-champions; Rankings from AP Poll

The 2005 Marshall Thundering Herd football team represented Marshall University in the 2005 NCAA Division I-A football season. Marshall was led by first-year head coach Mark Snyder and played their home games at Joan C. Edwards Stadium. This marked the Herd's inaugural season as a member of Conference USA and the C-USA East Division after spending the previous eight seasons as a member of the Mid-American Conference.

== Schedule ==
Date	Time	Opponent	Site	TV	Result	Attendance	Source
September 1	7:00 p.m.	No. 9 (I-AA) William & Mary*	Joan C. Edwards Stadium; Huntington, WV		W 36–24	25,102	
September 10	10:30 a.m.	Kansas State*	Joan C. Edwards Stadium; Huntington, WV	ESPN2	L 19–21	36,914	
September 24	6:00 p.m.	at UCF	Florida Citrus Bowl; Orlando, FL		L 13–23	22,127	
October 1	4:00 p.m.	SMU	Joan C. Edwards Stadium; Huntington, WV	CSTV	W 16–13 ^{OT}	25,218	
October 8	12:00 p.m.	at No. 3 Virginia Tech*	Lane Stadium; Blacksburg, VA	ESPN2	L 14–41	65,115	
October 15	5:00 p.m.	UAB	Joan C. Edwards Stadium; Huntington, WV	iTV	W 20–19	27,182	
October 22	9:00 p.m.	at UTEP	Sun Bowl Stadium; El Paso, TX	iTV	L 3–31	51,500	
October 29	7:00 p.m.	at Tulane	Ladd–Peebles Stadium; Mobile, AL	CSTV	W 27–26	13,290	
November 8	7:30 p.m.	Southern Miss	Joan C. Edwards Stadium; Huntington, WV	ESPN2	L 24–27 ^{OT}	22,238	
November 19	4:30 p.m.	East Carolina	Joan C. Edwards Stadium; Huntington, WV (rivalry)		L 29–34	22,408	
November 26	2:00 p.m.	at Memphis	Liberty Bowl Memorial Stadium; Memphis, TN	CSTV	L 3–26	46,403	
*Non-conference game; Rankings from AP Poll released prior to the game; All times are in Eastern time
