= 2005 Southern Miss Golden Eagles football team =

American college football season

2005 Southern Miss Golden Eagles football

New Orleans Bowl champion

New Orleans Bowl, W 31–19 vs. Arkansas State
- Conference: Conference USA
- Record: 7–5 (5–2 C-USA)
- Head coach: Jeff Bower (16th season)
- Offensive coordinator: Jay Johnson (1st season)
- Offensive scheme: Multiple
- Defensive coordinator: Jay Hopson (1st season)
- Base defense: 4–3
- Home stadium: M. M. Roberts Stadium

2005 Conference USA football standings
	Conf.			Overall
Team	W		L	W		L
East Division
UCF x	7	–	1	8	–	5
Southern Miss	5	–	3	7	–	5
Memphis	5	–	3	7	–	5
East Carolina	4	–	4	5	–	6
Marshall	3	–	5	4	–	7
UAB	3	–	5	5	–	6
West Division
Tulsa x$	6	–	2	9	–	4
UTEP	5	–	3	8	–	4
Houston	4	–	4	6	–	6
SMU	4	–	4	5	–	6
Tulane	1	–	7	2	–	9
Rice	1	–	7	1	–	10
Championship: Tulsa 44, UCF 27
$ – Conference champion; x – Division champion/co-champions; Rankings from AP Poll

The 2005 Southern Miss Golden Eagles football team represented the University of Southern Mississippi in the 2005 NCAA Division I-A football season. The Golden Eagles were led by head coach Jeff Bower and played their home games at M. M. Roberts Stadium. They were a member of the East Division of Conference USA.

== Schedule ==
Date	Time	Opponent	Site	TV	Result	Attendance	Source
September 10	6:45 pm	at Alabama*	Bryant–Denny Stadium; Tuscaloosa, AL	ESPN2	L 21–30	81,018	
September 17	6:00 pm	McNeese State*	M. M. Roberts Stadium; Hattiesburg, MS		W 48–20	28,174	
October 1	5:00 pm	at East Carolina	Dowdy–Ficklen Stadium; Greenville, NC		W 33–7	35,510	
October 8	6:00 pm	at Tulsa	M. M. Roberts Stadium; Hattiesburg, MS	CSTV	L 17–34	28,375	
October 15	6:00 pm	UCF	M. M. Roberts Stadium; Hattiesburg, MS		W 52–31	28,366	
October 21	7:00 pm	at UAB	Legion Field; Birmingham, AL	ESPN	W 37–28	31,363	
October 29	11:00 am	at NC State*	Carter–Finley Stadium; Raleigh, NC	ESPNU	L 17–21	52,500	
November 8	6:30 pm	at Marshall	Joan C. Edwards Stadium; Huntington, WV	ESPN2	W 27–24 ^{OT}	22,238	
November 13	4:00 pm	at Houston	Robertson Stadium; Houston, TX		L 24–27	15,119	
November 19	7:30 pm	Memphis	M. M. Roberts Stadium; Hattiesburg, MS (Black and Blue Bowl)	CSTV	L 22–24	25,667	
November 26	2:00 pm	Tulane	M. M. Roberts Stadium; Hattiesburg, MS		W 26–7	28,730	
December 20	7:00 pm	vs. Arkansas State*	Cajun Field; Lafayette, LA (New Orleans Bowl)	ESPN	W 31–19	18,338	
*Non-conference game; All times are in Central time
