= 2005 UCF Golden Knights football team =

American college football season

2005 UCF Golden Knights football
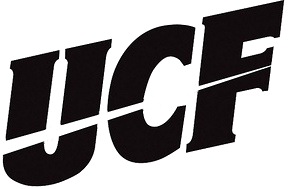

C-USA East Division champion

C-USA Championship, L 27–44 vs Tulsa

Hawaii Bowl, L 48–49 ^{OT} vs Nevada
- Conference: Conference USA
- East
- Record: 8–5 (7–2 C-USA)
- Head coach: George O'Leary (2nd season)
- Offensive coordinator: Tim Salem (2nd season)
- Defensive coordinator: Lance Thompson (2nd season)
- Home stadium: Citrus Bowl

2005 Conference USA football standings
	Conf.			Overall
Team	W		L	W		L
East Division
UCF x	7	–	1	8	–	5
Southern Miss	5	–	3	7	–	5
Memphis	5	–	3	7	–	5
East Carolina	4	–	4	5	–	6
Marshall	3	–	5	4	–	7
UAB	3	–	5	5	–	6
West Division
Tulsa x$	6	–	2	9	–	4
UTEP	5	–	3	8	–	4
Houston	4	–	4	6	–	6
SMU	4	–	4	5	–	6
Tulane	1	–	7	2	–	9
Rice	1	–	7	1	–	10
Championship: Tulsa 44, UCF 27
$ – Conference champion; x – Division champion/co-champions; Rankings from AP Poll

The 2005 UCF Golden Knights football team represented the University of Central Florida in the 2005 NCAA Division I-A football season. Their head coach was George O'Leary, in his second season with the team. It was their first year as a member of Conference USA, playing in the East Division.

After going 0–11 in 2004, their final season in the MAC, and O'Leary's first season as head coach, many did not expect much from UCF in its first C-USA season. They dropped their first two games (non-conference games), and stretched their active losing streak to 17 games - the longest active losing streak in the nation. The Golden Knights broke the streak by defeating Marshall for their first C-USA intra-conference victory. From there, UCF would go 7–1 in-conference (8–3 overall) and won the East Division. It was one of the best turnarounds in Division I-A history at the time (+8 wins), and they became the first team ever to go to a conference championship game the year after going winless. UCF hosted the inaugural C-USA Championship, but fell 44–27 to Tulsa.

Despite the loss in the conference championship game, the Golden Knights earned their first bowl invitation, going to the Hawaii Bowl against Nevada, the Western Athletic Conference co-champions. UCF fought the Wolf Pack hard and pushed the game to overtime. They lost the game 49–48 after a missed extra point. Wide receiver Brandon Marshall was named co-MVP of the game.

== Schedule ==
Date	Time	Opponent	Site	TV	Result	Attendance
September 1	7:45pm	at South Carolina*	Williams–Brice Stadium; Columbia, SC (College GameDay)	ESPN	L 15–24	82,753
September 17	7:00pm	at South Florida*	Raymond James Stadium; Tampa, FL (rivalry)	FSN	L 14–31	45,139
September 24	6:00pm	Marshall	Florida Citrus Bowl; Orlando, FL	CSTV	W 23–13	22,127
October 1	8:00pm	at Louisiana-Lafayette*	Cajun Field; Lafayette, LA		W 24–21	18,262
October 8	6:00pm	Memphis	Florida Citrus Bowl; Orlando, FL	CSTV	W 38–17	20,562
October 15	7:00pm	at Southern Miss	M. M. Roberts Stadium; Hattiesburg, MS	CSTV	L 31–52	28,366
October 21	7:00pm	Tulane	Florida Citrus Bowl; Orlando, FL		W 34–24	15,009
October 29	2:00pm	at East Carolina	Dowdy–Ficklen Stadium; Greenville, NC	CSTV	W 30–20	34,410
November 5	6:00pm	Houston^{†}	Florida Citrus Bowl; Orlando, FL	ion	W 31–29	32,635
November 12	4:00pm	at UAB	Legion Field; Birmingham, AL	CSTV	W 27–21	12,199
November 19	3:00pm	at Rice	Rice Stadium; Houston, TX	CSTV	W 31–28	8,267
December 3	12:00pm	Tulsa	Florida Citrus Bowl; Orlando, FL (C-USA Championship Game)	ESPN	L 27–44	51,978
December 24	8:30pm	vs. Nevada	Aloha Stadium; Halawa, HI (Hawaii Bowl)	ESPN	L 48–49 ^{OT}	26,254
*Non-conference game; ^{†}Homecoming; All times are in Eastern time

== Game summaries ==
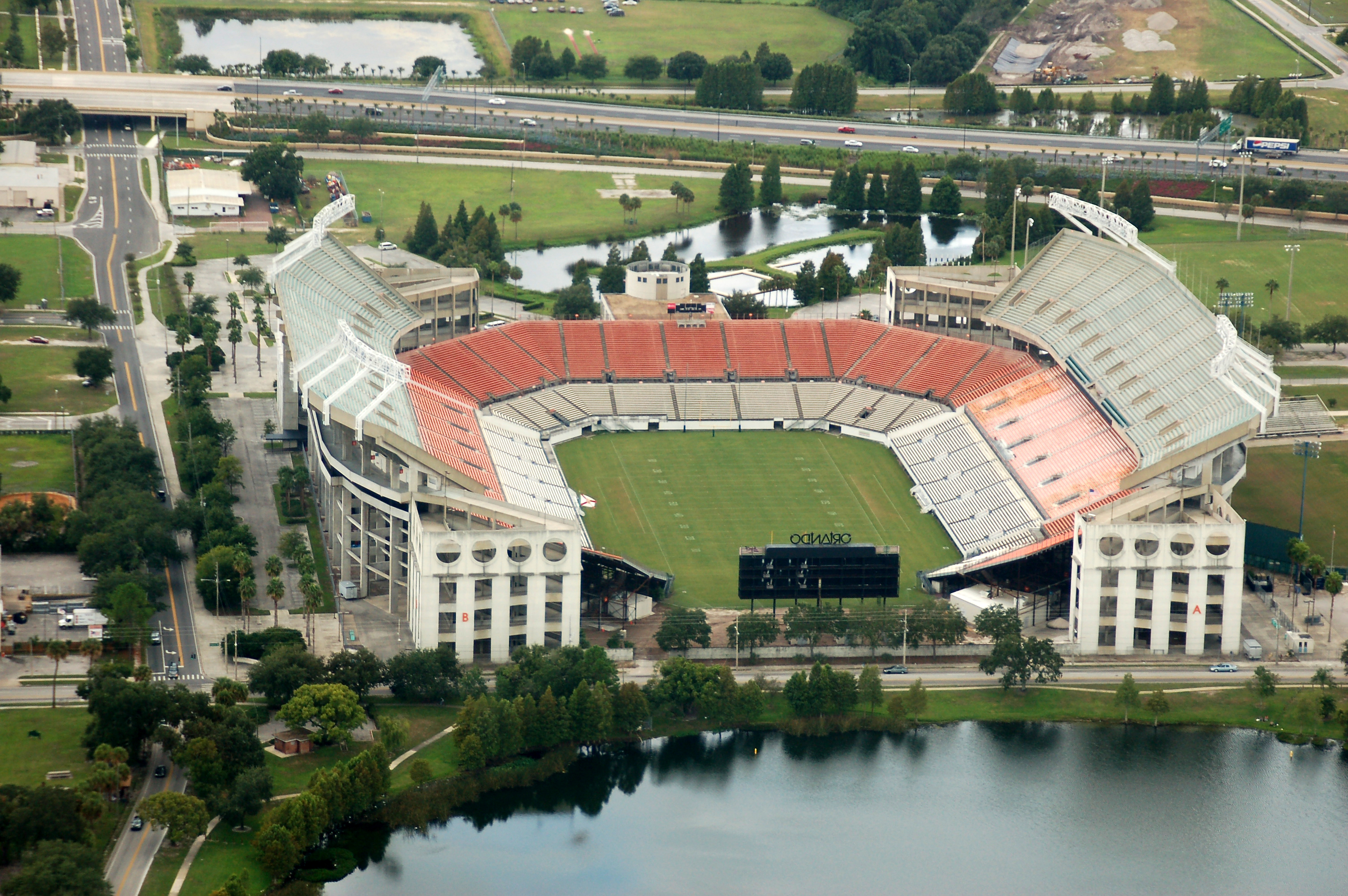
The Citrus Bowl, the Knights home field

=== September 1 — at South Carolina ===
UCF opened the season on Thursday night at South Carolina. It was the first game for Steve Spurrier as head coach of South Carolina, and the second season for George O'Leary with UCF. The Golden Knights were riding a 15-game losing streak dating back to November 2003. The Gamecocks jumped out to an easy 14–0 lead, and then led 24–3 at the end of the third quarter. Quarterback Steven Moffett woke up the Golden Knights, at one point completing ten straight passes, and trimmed deficit to 24–15. Moffett threw a 16-yard touchdown pass to Mike Walker, then John Brown kicked a 29-yard field goal. With the score 24–13, UCF faced a 4th & Goal at the 1-yard line with less than three minutes remaining. Kevin Smith's dive on 4th & Goal was stuffed for no gain. UCF lost its 16th game in a row.

=== September 17 — at South Florida ===
The first ever meeting between the two rivals in football took place at Raymond James Stadium. The Bulls rushed for 326 yards en route to a 31–14 victory. Quarterback Steven Moffett threw for 208 yards and one touchdown, and rushed for one touchdown in the loss. The South Florida defense held the UCF rush duo of Kevin Smith and Dontavius Wilcox to 4 yards through the first three quarters. UCF was shut out until late in the third quarter when Joe Burnett returned a punt 60 yards to the South Florida 4, setting up Steven Moffett's touchdown run on the next play. The Knights losing streak reached 17 games.

=== September 24 — Marshall ===
UCF's 17-game losing streak - the longest active losing streak in the nation, came to an end as the Golden Knights defeated Marshall 23–13. UCF hosted the Thundering Heard in their first conference game as part of C-USA. UCF jumped out to a 17–0 halftime lead after a 5-yard touchdown pass to Brandon Marshall and a 1-yard touchdown run by Kevin Smith. The Golden Knights defense held Marshall to only 11 yards rushing, forced two fumbles, and intercepted Jimmy Skinner twice. After the game, the Citrus Bowl crowd stormed the field and tore down the goalposts.

=== October 1 — at Louisiana-Lafayette ===
Backup kicker John Brown kicked a 28-yard field goal with 2 seconds left in regulation to give the Golden Knights a 24–21 victory at Louisiana-Lafayette. The win snapped UCF's 15-game road losing streak, and they improved to 2–2 (2–0 in C-USA) on the season. UCF blew an early 21–0 lead, and the Cajuns tied the score at 21–21 with 1:51 to go. But Kevin Smith got the Golden Knights to the 11-yard line, and set the game-winning kick. Quarterback Steven Moffett threw for 232 yards and three touchdown in the victory.

=== October 8 — Memphis ===
Steven Moffett threw for 290 yards and three touchdowns as UCF defeated Memphis 38–17. Kevin Smith rushed 164 yards and one touchdown, as the Golden Knights won their third straight game.

=== October 15 — at Southern Miss ===
Five turnovers in the first half and miscues all game doomed the Golden Knights. UCF lost to Southern Miss 52–31.

=== October 21 — Tulane ===
Hurricane Wilma saw the game moved from Saturday to Friday night. Kevin Smith (113 yards) and Jason Peters (100 yards) became the first UCF duo to rush for over 100 yards apiece in a single game in 13 years. The Golden Knights forced three turnovers, but 18 penalties on the night kept the Green Wave in the game. Steven Moffett threw a 7-yard touchdown pass to Mike Walker with 7 seconds left in the first half - extending his streak of games with at least one touchdown pass to ten. UCF improved to 4–3 (3–1 in C-USA) and 3–0 and home.

=== October 29 — at East Carolina ===
The Golden Knights led 17–3 at halftime, but found themselves trailing 20–17 to the Pirates in the fourth quarter. Steven Moffett completed only ten passes but a 38-yard touchdown pass to Mike Walker with 9:12 left in regulation put the Knights back in front. Moffett connected with Walker again just five minutes later to put UCF up for good 30–20. UCF improved to 5–3 (4–1 in C-USA) on the season.

=== November 5 — Houston ===
Steven Moffett threw for 275 yards and two touchdown passes and rushed for one touchdown as the Golden Knights defeated Houston 31–29 at the Citrus Bowl. The Knights improved to 6–3 (5–1 in C-USA) and 4–0 at home, and became bowl eligible. Houston rallied in the second half, scoring three touchdowns in the final 18 minutes. Kevin Smith put the Knights up 31–22 with 6:29 to go. But only a few plays later, Kevin Kolb connected with Donnie Avery for a 76-yard touchdown pass. The Golden Knights got the ball with 6:12 left leading 31–29, and bled the clock down to 1:29 to go. Facing 4th & 1 at their own 44 yard line, George O'Leary gambled by calling for a fake punt. James Cook was stuffed for no gain, turning the ball over on downs. Houston took over, but Kolb was sacked by Paul Carrington, and then threw three straight incompletions.

=== November 12 — at UAB ===
UCF trailed 21–10, but Matt Prater's three second half field goals helped lift the Golden Knights over UAB. Travonti Johnson intercepted Darrell Hackney early in the fourth quarter, setting up 14-yard touchdown run by Jason Peters. UCF went for two, and tied the score at 21–21 with 13 minutes left. On the next drive, Hackney fumbled away a shotgun snap, which was recovered by UCF at the 41-yard line. Prater put the Knights ahead 24–21 with 5:31 left to play.

On the first play of their next drive, the Blazers turned the ball over again. Chico Cleveland caught a 15-yard pass, but fumbled, and Ronnell Sandy recovered the ball at the 44. Later in the quarter, Hackney threw an interception, the fourth turnover of the fourth quarter. Five runs by Kevin Smith advanced the Knights to the 6-yard line. Prater kicked a 23-yard field goal with 50 seconds left to put the Knights up by 6, and the 11-point comeback was their biggest comeback win of the season.

=== November 19 — at Rice ===
Jason Venson intercepted Owl's quarterback Joel Armstrong with 4:08 left in the fourth quarter. The Knights took over and Steven Moffett threw an 18-yard touchdown pass to Brandon Marshall to take a 31–28 lead with 1:25 left. Seconds later, Joe Burnett intercepted Armstrong to seal the victory. UCF won the C-USA East division crown, and set a mark for one of the best single-season turnarounds in NCAA Division I-A history. Rice entered the game with only 1 win, but racked up 237 yards rushing, and an 80-yard touchdown pass that put them ahead early in the fourth quarter. UCF clinched the best record in C-USA, and earned the right to host the C-USA Championship game.

== Postseason game summaries ==
=== December 3 — Tulsa (C-USA Championship) ===
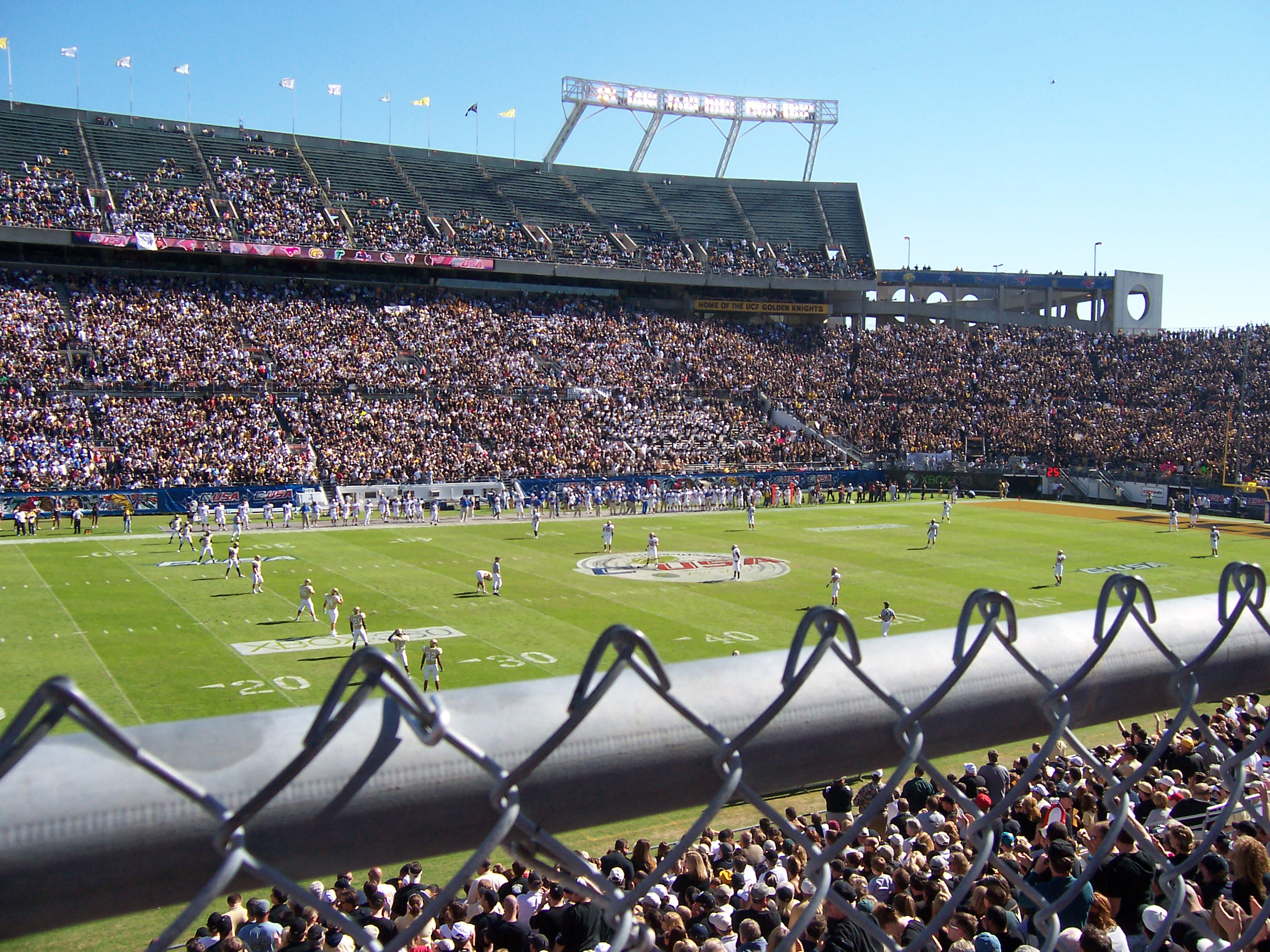
the 2005 C-USA Championship Game.

	1	2	3	4	Total
Golden Hurricane	14	17	10	3	44
Golden Knights	7	20	0	0	27

UCF hosted Tulsa in the inaugural C-USA Championship game at the Citrus Bowl. A UCF record home crowd of 51,978 saw the Golden Knights fall short by a score of 44–27. Quarterback Steven Moffett threw for 190 yards and 1 touchdown pass, but threw two interceptions and lost two fumbles in the game. On the opening drive, the Golden Knights drove 80 yards in 8 plays. Moffett connected to Willie Thornton for a 43-yard touchdown pass and an early 7–0 lead. Tulsa, however, scored 21 unanswered points. Nick Graham intercepted a Moffett pass and ran it 58 yards all the way down to the UCF 2-yard line. Uril Parrish's 2-yard dive gave Tulsa a 21–7 lead 13 seconds into the second quarter.

UCF got back in the game with a 7-play, 92-yard drive to start their second quarter. Kevin Smith, facing a 3rd & 1, broke free for a 31-yard touchdown run, trimming the deficit to 21–14. After a Matt Prater field goal, Joe Burnett's 68-yard punt return touchdown put the Golden Knights ahead 24–21. An excessive celebration penalty against UCF on the touchdown, however, gave Tulsa good field position. They scored on the drive to re-take the lead, then put up a field goal to go up 31–24. UCF got the ball back just before halftime. Prater kicked his second field goal of the game as time expired in the half. The Golden Hurricane led 31–27 at halftime.

Tulsa shoutout UCF in the second half, and pulled away to a 44–27 victory. With the loss, the Knights fell to 8–4 and accepted an invitation to the Hawaii Bowl.

=== December 24 — Nevada (Hawaii Bowl) ===
	1	2	3	4	OT	Total
Wolf Pack	7	21	0	14	7	49
Golden Knights	17	3	10	12	6	48

UCF faced WAC co-champions Nevada in the Sheraton Hawaiʻi Bowl on Christmas Eve. It was UCF's first ever bowl appearance, and their second visit to Hawaii. The Knights had faced the Rainbow Warriors back in 1995 as a Division I-AA team.

==== First quarter ====
UCF jumped out to a quick 14–0 lead in the first quarter. On their first drive, quarterback Steven Moffett drove the Golden Knights 78 yards in only four plays for their first score. After an 18-yard run by Kevin Smith, Moffett threw a 51–yard touchdown pass to Brandon Marshall. Their second drive took only two plays. Kevin Smith took a hand–off and broke away for a 78–yard touchdown run. Just six minutes into the game, the Golden Knights were up by 14.

Robert Hubbard got Nevada on the board with a 4–yard touchdown run. It came after a 59–yard run by Mitchell and cut the lead to 14–7. Late in the first quarter, UCF quarterback Steven Moffett fumbled away the ball on a quarterback keeper at his own 27-yard line, but the call on the field was overturned after review. The Golden Knights maintained possession and drove into Nevada territory. UCF kicker Matt Prater capped off the 11–play drive with a 47-yard field goal and a 17–7 lead at the end of the first quarter.

==== Second quarter ====
In part due to UCF miscues, Nevada took control of the game during the second quarter. Running back B.J. Mitchell scored twice on two 1–yard touchdown runs for Nevada to take the lead 21–17. The first score came after UCF kicker Matt Prater missed a 40–yard field goal attempt (off a wobbly snap). Robert Hubbard then blasted for a 49-yard run to the UCF 1 yard line, setting up Mitchell's first touchdown. The next Nevada score came after UCF punter Aaron Horne shanked a punt deep in their own territory. The punt went only 14 yards, setting Nevada up at the UCF 35-yard line. Nevada went the 35 yards in five plays, with Hubbard's second touchdown run.

Late in the second quarter, Nevada extended their lead, going 78 yards in only three plays and just over one minute. Jeff Rowe threw a 54-yard pass to Nichiren Flowers, then Hubbard broke away for another long run, this time a 24-yard touchdown rush to make the score 28–17. UCF drove to the Nevada 16-yard line in the final minute and Matt Prater kicked a 38-yard field goal. Nevada led 28–20 at halftime.

==== Third quarter ====
Early in the third quarter, Steven Moffett fired a 29-yard touchdown pass to Brandon Marshall. The drive was aided by a pass interference call on Nevada which advanced the Golden Knights to the Nevada 30-yard line. The ensuing two-point conversion failed and Nevada still led 28–26. With just under two minutes to go in the third quarter, Kevin Smith scored on a 3-yard touchdown run to give UCF a 32–28 lead. UCF again tried for two points, but once more failed.

==== Fourth quarter ====
In the fourth quarter, Robert Hubbard scored a 5-yard touchdown run, after a lengthy clock–burning drive to give Nevada a 35–32 lead. With 3:18 to go in the game, quarterback Jeff Rowe threw a 7-yard touchdown pass to wide receiver Travis Branzell to extend the Nevada lead to 42–32.

On UCF's next possession, they failed to reach the endzone and settled a long field goal attempt. Matt Prater nailed a 46-yard field goal to cut the lead to 42–35 with just 1:35 left in regulation. The ensuing onside kick was recovered by UCF at the 48-yard line and they took advantage of it. Steven Moffett connected with Brandon Marshall for a 27-yard gain all the way to the Nevada 21-yard line. Three plays later with 55 seconds left, Moffett found Marshall open on a slant inside the 5-yard line and Marshall leaped to the endzone for a 16-yard touchdown pass. Prater's extra point tied the game 42–42 and sent the game to overtime.

==== Overtime ====
In overtime, UCF won the coin toss and elected to defer. Jeff Rowe scored on a 4-yard touchdown run to make the lead 49–42 in favor of Nevada. Kevin Smith answered with a 19-yard touchdown run for UCF, but Matt Prater missed the extra point and Nevada escaped with a 49–48 win.
