= 2005 NCAA Division I-A football season =

American college football season

2005 NCAA Division I-A season
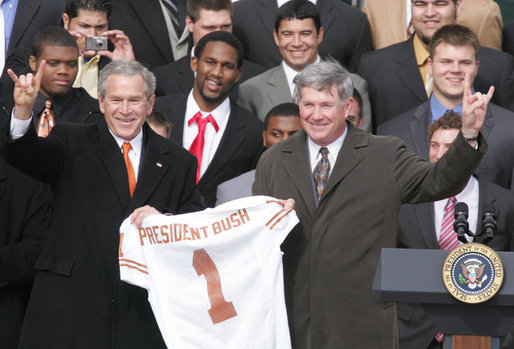
- Texas Longhorns and head coach Mack Brown with President George W. Bush after winning the national championship
- Number of teams: 119
- Duration: September 1 – December 3
- Preseason AP No. 1: USC

Postseason
- Duration: December 20, 2005 – January 4, 2006
- Bowl games: 28
- Heisman Trophy: USC running back Reggie Bush

Bowl Championship Series
- 2006 Rose Bowl
- Site: Rose Bowl Stadium, Pasadena, California
- Champion(s): Texas

Division I-A football seasons
- ← 2004 2006 →

The 2005 NCAA Division I-A football season was the highest level of college football competition in the United States organized by the National Collegiate Athletic Association (NCAA). The regular season began on September 1, 2005, and ended on December 3, 2005. The postseason concluded on January 4, 2006, with the Rose Bowl, which served as the season's BCS National Championship Game.

The USC Trojans and the Texas Longhorns finished the regular season as the only undefeated teams in Division I-A and consequently met in the Rose Bowl to play for the national title. Texas defeated USC largely due to the performance of quarterback Vince Young, who gained 467 yards of total offense and ran for three touchdowns. The Longhorns won their first national championship since 1970, and their first consensus national title since 1969.

== Rule changes ==
- After the Big Ten Conference's 2004 experiment with instant replay, its use was expanded to all but the Sun Belt and the WAC conferences in Division I-A. The rules varied between conferences (including the use of coaches' challenges similar to the NFL in the Mountain West Conference) until the NCAA standardized the rules in 2006. Replay was also permitted in bowl games and, provided the visiting team agreed to its use, in non-conference regular season games.
- The protection for a receiver who signals a fair catch includes situations when the ball is muffed until it hits the ground.
- Penalties for spearing or similar hits in which the tackler leads with the crown of the head are enforced regardless of the "intent" of the tackler.
- The penalty for leaping on field goals/PATs now states it is a foul if a player lined up more than one yard behind the line of scrimmage jumps and lands on players of any team trying to block the kick. If lined up one yard or closer to the line, it is not a foul.
- Eliminated the "legal clipping zone"; hits from behind below the knee are prohibited anywhere on the field.
- Provided for officials a specific list of acts by players considered unsportsmanlike conduct, including the "throat slash", high stepping and diving into the end zone unchallenged among others. Spontaneous celebrations by players are allowed provided they are not prolonged, taunting, or bring attention to themselves.

== Conference changes ==
A major conference realignment occurred prior to the 2005 season, when 18 teams in Division I-A changed conferences.

Temple was expelled from the Big East Conference while Army ended its brief affiliation with Conference USA, resulting in both schools becoming Independents.

Boston College left the Big East to become the 12th member of the Atlantic Coast Conference (ACC), allowing the league to split into two divisions and hold an annual championship game.

Cincinnati, Louisville and South Florida left Conference USA to join the Big East. Texas Christian University also left Conference USA to become the Mountain West Conference's ninth member.

Despite its losses, Conference USA added six schools to increase its membership to twelve, poaching Marshall and UCF from the Mid-American Conference and Rice, Southern Methodist, Tulsa, and UTEP from the Western Athletic Conference (WAC). Like the ACC, Conference USA split into two divisions and started a conference championship game.

The Western Athletic Conference added Idaho, New Mexico State and Utah State from the Sun Belt Conference.

The Sun Belt picked up I-A Independents Florida Atlantic and Florida International.

School	2004 Conference	2005 Conference
Army Black Knights	Conference USA	I-A Independent
Boston College Eagles	Big East	ACC
Central Florida Knights	MAC	Conference USA
Cincinnati Bearcats	Conference USA	Big East
Louisville Cardinals	Conference USA	Big East
Marshall Thundering Herd	MAC	Conference USA
Florida Atlantic Owls	I-A Independent	Sun Belt
Florida International Panthers	I-A Independent	Sun Belt
Idaho Vandals	Sun Belt	WAC
New Mexico State Aggies	Sun Belt	WAC
Rice Owls	WAC	Conference USA
South Florida Bulls	Conference USA	Big East
SMU Mustangs	WAC	Conference USA
Temple Owls	Big East Conference	I-A Independent
TCU Horned Frogs	Conference USA	Mountain West
Tulsa Golden Hurricane	WAC	Conference USA
Utah State Aggies	Sun Belt	WAC
UTEP Miners	WAC	Conference USA

== Coaching changes ==
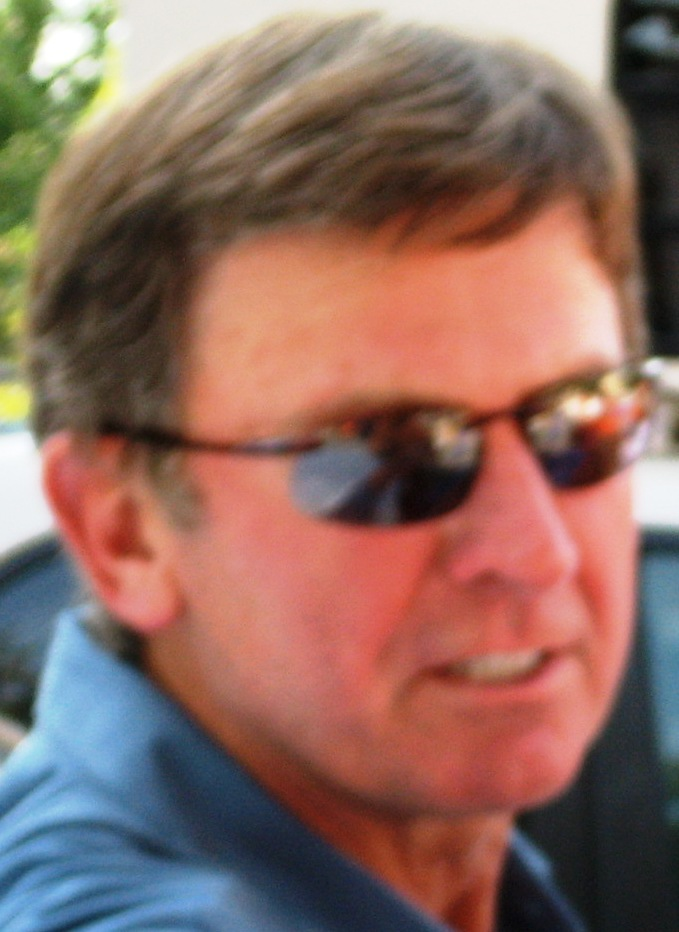
Steve Spurrier as coach at the University of Florida

Steve Spurrier returned to college coaching for the first time since 2001 after a stint in the NFL, leading South Carolina to a respectable 7–5 season. Urban Meyer, after leading Utah to an undefeated season in 2004, took over at Florida (Spurrier's old school). Charlie Weis left the New England Patriots to become head coach at alma mater Notre Dame, taking the team to a BCS bowl.

Longtime head coaches Barry Alvarez of Wisconsin and Bill Snyder of Kansas State, both of whom took struggling programs to national prominence during their tenures, retired. Dan Hawkins, having helped make Boise State a powerhouse in the Western Athletic Conference, left the Broncos to coach struggling Colorado.

== Regular season top 10 matchups ==
Rankings reflect the AP Poll. Rankings for Week 8 and beyond will list BCS Rankings first and AP Poll second. Teams that failed to be a top 10 team for one poll or the other will be noted.

- Week 2
  - No. 2 Texas defeated No. 4 Ohio State, 25–22 (Ohio Stadium, Columbus, Ohio)
- Week 3
  - No. 6 Florida defeated No. 5 Tennessee, 16–7 (Ben Hill Griffin Stadium, Gainesville, Florida)
- Week 4
  - No. 10 Tennessee defeated No. 4 LSU, 30–27 ^{OT} (Tiger Stadium, Baton Rouge, Louisiana)
- Week 6
  - No. 5 Georgia defeated No. 8 Tennessee, 27–14 (Neyland Stadium, Knoxville, Tennessee)
- Week 7
  - No. 1 USC defeated No. 9 Notre Dame, 34–31 (Notre Dame Stadium, South Bend, Indiana)
- Week 8
  - No. 2/2 Texas defeated No. 7/10 Texas Tech, 52–17 (Darrell K Royal–Texas Memorial Stadium, Austin, Texas)
- Week 10
  - No. 6/5 Miami defeated No. 3/3 Virginia Tech, 27–7 (Lane Stadium, Blacksburg, Virginia)
- Week 11
  - No. 7/5 LSU defeated No. 3/4 Alabama, 16–13 ^{OT} (Bryant-Denny Stadium, Tuscaloosa, Alabama)

== Conference standings ==
2005 Atlantic Coast Conference football standings
	Conf.			Overall
Team	W		L	W		L
Atlantic Division
No. 23 Florida State xy$	5	–	3	8	–	5
No. 18 Boston College x	5	–	3	9	–	3
No. 21 Clemson	4	–	4	8	–	4
Wake Forest	3	–	5	4	–	7
NC State	3	–	5	7	–	5
Maryland	3	–	5	5	–	6
Coastal Division
No. 7 Virginia Tech x	7	–	1	11	–	2
No. 17 Miami (FL)	6	–	2	9	–	3
Georgia Tech	5	–	3	7	–	5
North Carolina	4	–	4	5	–	6
Virginia	3	–	5	7	–	5
Duke	0	–	8	1	–	10
Championship: Florida State 27, Virginia Tech 22
$ – BCS representative as conference champion; x – Division champion/co-champions; y – Championship game participant; Rankings from AP Poll

2005 Big 12 Conference football standings
	Conf.			Overall
Team	W		L	W		L
North Division
Colorado x	5	–	3	7	–	6
No. 24 Nebraska	4	–	4	8	–	4
Missouri	4	–	4	7	–	5
Iowa State	4	–	4	7	–	5
Kansas	3	–	5	7	–	5
Kansas State	2	–	6	5	–	6
South Division
No. 1 Texas x$#	8	–	0	13	–	0
No. 20 Texas Tech	6	–	2	9	–	3
No. 22 Oklahoma	6	–	2	8	–	4
Texas A&M	3	–	5	5	–	6
Baylor	2	–	6	5	–	6
Oklahoma State	1	–	7	4	–	7
Championship: Texas 70, Colorado 3
# – BCS National Champion; $ – BCS representative as conference champion; x – Division champion/co-champions; Rankings from AP Poll

2005 Big East Conference football standings
	Conf.			Overall
Team	W		L	W		L
No. 5 West Virginia $	7	–	0	11	–	1
No. 19 Louisville	5	–	2	9	–	3
Rutgers	4	–	3	7	–	5
South Florida	4	–	3	6	–	6
Pittsburgh	4	–	3	5	–	6
Connecticut	2	–	5	5	–	6
Cincinnati	2	–	5	4	–	7
Syracuse	0	–	7	1	–	10
$ – BCS representative as conference champion; Rankings from AP Poll

2005 Big Ten Conference football standings
	Conf.			Overall
Team	W		L	W		L
No. 3 Penn State $+	7	–	1	11	–	1
No. 4 Ohio State %+	7	–	1	10	–	2
No. 15 Wisconsin	5	–	3	10	–	3
Michigan	5	–	3	7	–	5
Northwestern	5	–	3	7	–	5
Iowa	5	–	3	7	–	5
Minnesota	4	–	4	7	–	5
Purdue	3	–	5	5	–	6
Michigan State	2	–	6	5	–	6
Indiana	1	–	7	4	–	7
Illinois	0	–	8	2	–	9
$ – BCS representative as conference champion; % – BCS at-large representative; + – Conference co-champions; Rankings from AP Poll

2005 Conference USA football standings
	Conf.			Overall
Team	W		L	W		L
East Division
UCF x	7	–	1	8	–	5
Southern Miss	5	–	3	7	–	5
Memphis	5	–	3	7	–	5
East Carolina	4	–	4	5	–	6
Marshall	3	–	5	4	–	7
UAB	3	–	5	5	–	6
West Division
Tulsa x$	6	–	2	9	–	4
UTEP	5	–	3	8	–	4
Houston	4	–	4	6	–	6
SMU	4	–	4	5	–	6
Tulane	1	–	7	2	–	9
Rice	1	–	7	1	–	10
Championship: Tulsa 44, UCF 27
$ – Conference champion; x – Division champion/co-champions; Rankings from AP Poll

2005 Mid-American Conference football standings
	Conf.			Overall
Team	W		L	W		L
East Division
Akron xy$	5	–	3	7	–	6
Miami (OH) x	5	–	3	7	–	4
Bowling Green x	5	–	3	6	–	5
Ohio	3	–	5	4	–	7
Buffalo	1	–	7	1	–	10
Kent State	0	–	8	1	–	10
West Division
Northern Illinois xy	6	–	2	7	–	5
Toledo x	6	–	2	9	–	3
Western Michigan	5	–	3	7	–	4
Central Michigan	5	–	3	6	–	5
Ball State	4	–	4	4	–	7
Eastern Michigan	3	–	5	4	–	7
Championship: Akron 31, NIU 30
$ – Conference champion; x – Division champion/co-champions

2005 Mountain West Conference football standings
	Conf.			Overall
Team	W		L	W		L
No. 11 TCU $	8	–	0	11	–	1
BYU	5	–	3	6	–	6
Colorado State	5	–	3	6	–	6
Utah	4	–	4	7	–	5
New Mexico	4	–	4	6	–	5
San Diego State	4	–	4	5	–	7
Air Force	3	–	5	4	–	7
Wyoming	2	–	6	4	–	7
UNLV	1	–	7	2	–	9
$ – Conference champion; Rankings from AP Poll

2005 Pacific-10 Conference football standings
	Conf.			Overall
Team	W		L	W		L
No. 2 USC † $	8	–	0	12	–	1
No. 13 Oregon	7	–	1	10	–	2
No. 16 UCLA	6	–	2	10	–	2
No. 25 California	4	–	4	8	–	4
Arizona State	4	–	4	7	–	5
Stanford	4	–	4	5	–	6
Oregon State	3	–	5	5	–	6
Arizona	2	–	6	3	–	8
Washington State	1	–	7	4	–	7
Washington	1	–	7	2	–	9
$ – Conference champion; † – USC later vacated 12 wins (8 in conference) and 1 loss due to NCAA sanctions.; Rankings from AP Poll

2005 Southeastern Conference football standings
	Conf.			Overall
Team	W		L	W		L
Eastern Division
No. 10 Georgia x$	6	–	2	10	–	3
South Carolina	5	–	3	7	–	5
No. 12 Florida	5	–	3	9	–	3
Vanderbilt	3	–	5	5	–	6
Tennessee	3	–	5	5	–	6
Kentucky	2	–	6	3	–	8
Western Division
No. 5 LSU xy	7	–	1	11	–	2
No. 14 Auburn x	7	–	1	9	–	3
No. 8 Alabama	6	–	2	10	–	2
Arkansas	2	–	6	4	–	7
Mississippi State	1	–	7	3	–	8
Ole Miss	1	–	7	3	–	8
Championship: Georgia 34, LSU 14
$ – BCS representative as conference champion; x – Division champion/co-champions; y – Championship game participant; Alabama had all victories vacated by the NCAA in 2010. As such, the official record for Alabama is 0–2 (0–2).; Rankings from AP Poll

2005 Sun Belt Conference football standings
	Conf.			Overall
Team	W		L	W		L
Arkansas State +	5	–	2	6	–	6
Louisiana–Lafayette +	5	–	2	6	–	5
Louisiana–Monroe +	5	–	2	5	–	6
Middle Tennessee	3	–	4	4	–	7
Troy	3	–	4	4	–	7
Florida Atlantic	2	–	5	2	–	9
North Texas	2	–	5	2	–	9
FIU†	0	–	4	0	–	6
+ – Conference co-champions; † – The NCAA vacated all 5 of FIU's (3–4, 5–6) wins

2005 Western Athletic Conference football standings
	Conf.			Overall
Team	W		L	W		L
Boise State +	7	–	1	9	–	4
Nevada +	7	–	1	9	–	3
Louisiana Tech	6	–	2	7	–	4
Fresno State	6	–	2	8	–	5
Hawaii	4	–	4	5	–	7
San Jose State	2	–	6	3	–	8
Utah State	2	–	6	3	–	8
Idaho	2	–	6	2	–	9
New Mexico State	0	–	8	0	–	12
+ – Conference co-champions

2005 NCAA Division I-A independents football records
	Conf.			Overall
Team	W		L	W		L
No. 9 Notre Dame %		–		9	–	3
Navy		–		8	–	4
Army		–		4	–	7
Temple		–		0	–	11
% – BCS at-large representative; Rankings from AP Poll

== I-AA team wins over I-A teams ==
Italics denotes I-AA teams.

Date	Visiting team	Home team	Site	Result	Attendance	Ref.
September 1	Northwestern State	UL Monroe	Malone Stadium • Monroe, Louisiana (rivalry)	27–23	21,726	
September 17	UC Davis	Stanford	Stanford Stadium • Stanford, California	20–18	31,250	
^{#}Rankings from AP Poll released prior to game.

== Bowl games ==
=== BCS bowls ===
- Rose Bowl: No. 2 (BCS No. 2, Big 12 Champ) Texas 41, No. 1 (BCS No. 1, Pac 10 Champ) Southern California 38
- Fiesta Bowl: (BCS No. 4) No. 4 Ohio State 34, (At Large) No. 5 Notre Dame 20
- Sugar Bowl: (Big East Champ) No. 11 West Virginia 38, (SEC Champ) No. 8 Georgia 35
- Orange Bowl: (Big Ten Champ) No. 3 Penn State 26, (ACC Champ) No. 22 Florida State 23 (3 OT)

=== Other New Year's Day bowls ===
- Cotton Bowl: No. 13 Alabama 13, No. 18 Texas Tech 10
- Capital One Bowl: No. 21 Wisconsin 24, No. 7 Auburn 10
- Gator Bowl: No. 12 Virginia Tech 35, No. 15 Louisville 24
- Outback Bowl: No. 16 Florida 31, No. 25 Iowa 24

=== December bowl games ===
- Peach Bowl: No. 10 LSU 40, No. 9 Miami (FL) 3
- Houston Bowl: No. 14 TCU 27, Iowa State 24
- Liberty Bowl: (C-USA Champ) Tulsa 31, Fresno State 24
- MPC Computers Bowl: No. 19 Boston College 27, Boise State 21
- Meineke Car Care Bowl: NC State 14, South Florida 0
- Independence Bowl: Missouri 38, South Carolina 31
- Sun Bowl: No. 17 UCLA 50, Northwestern 38
- Music City Bowl: Virginia 34, Minnesota 31
- Holiday Bowl: Oklahoma 17, No. 6 Oregon 14
- Emerald Bowl: Utah 38, No. 24 Georgia Tech 10
- Alamo Bowl: Nebraska 32, No. 20 Michigan 28
- Insight Bowl: Arizona State 45, Rutgers 40
- Champs Sports Bowl: No. 23 Clemson 19, Colorado 10
- Motor City Bowl: Memphis 38, (MAC Champ) Akron 31
- Hawai'i Bowl: (WAC Champ) Nevada 49, UCF 48 (OT)
- Fort Worth Bowl: Kansas 42, Houston 13
- Las Vegas Bowl: California 35, BYU 28
- Poinsettia Bowl: Navy 51, Colorado State 30
- GMAC Bowl: Toledo 45, UTEP 13
- New Orleans Bowl: Southern Mississippi 31, (Sun Belt Champ) Arkansas State 19

== Awards and honors ==
=== Heisman Trophy ===
Heisman Trophy voting was primarily for three players: Reggie Bush, Matt Leinart (who won the trophy in 2004) and Vince Young. Bush won the trophy, with Young (who helped Texas win their first national championship since 1970) second in the voting:

Player	School	Position	1st	2nd	3rd	Total
Reggie Bush	USC	RB	784	89	11	2,541
Vince Young	Texas	QB	79	613	145	1,608
Matt Leinart	USC	QB	18	147	449	797
Brady Quinn	Notre Dame	QB	7	21	128	191
Michael Robinson	Penn State	QB	2	7	29	49
A. J. Hawk	Ohio State	LB	0	3	23	29
DeAngelo Williams	Memphis	RB	1	2	19	26
Drew Olson	UCLA	QB	1	2	14	21
Jerome Harrison	Washington State	RB	0	4	12	20
Elvis Dumervil	Louisville	DE	0	0	9	9

In June 2010 the NCAA ruled that Bush had received "improper benefits", violating NCAA policy. On September 14, he announced in a statement from the New Orleans Saints that he would forfeit his 2005 Heisman Trophy. Runner-up Vince Young said that he would not accept the trophy if Bush forfeited it. On September 15, the Heisman Trust announced that the 2005 trophy would be vacated and there would be no winner for the season. Bush's Heisman win would be reinstanted on April 24, 2024, with the Heisman Trophy Trust citing "enormous" changes in college athletics, including the introduction of name, image and likeness (NIL) a few years prior.

=== Major award winners ===
- Walter Camp Award (top player): Reggie Bush
- Maxwell Award (top player): Vince Young, QB, Texas
- AP Player Of the Year: Reggie Bush, RB, USC
- Lombardi Award (top lineman/linebacker): A. J. Hawk, Ohio State
- John Mackey Award (tight end): Marcedes Lewis, UCLA
- Doak Walker Award (running back)
- Chuck Bednarik Award (defensive player): Paul Posluszny, LB, Penn State
- Outland Trophy (interior lineman): Greg Eslinger, C, Minnesota
- Dave Rimington Trophy (center): Greg Eslinger, Minnesota
- Davey O'Brien Award (quarterback): Vince Young, QB, Texas
- Johnny Unitas Award (senior quarterback): Matt Leinart, USC
- Fred Biletnikoff Award (wide receiver): Mike Hass, Oregon State
- Jim Thorpe Award (defensive back): Michael Huff, Texas
- Lou Groza Award (placekicker): Alexis Serna, Oregon State
- Ray Guy Award (punter): Ryan Plackemeier, Wake Forest
- The Home Depot Coach of the Year Award: Joe Paterno, Penn State
- Paul "Bear" Bryant Award (head coach): Mack Brown, Texas
- Broyles Award (assistant coach): Greg Davis, Texas

=== All-Americans ===
==== 2005 Consensus All-America team ====
Offense
Position	Name	Height	Weight (lbs.)	Class	Hometown	Team
QB	Vince Young	6'5"	229	Jr.	Houston, Texas	Texas
RB	Reggie Bush	6'0"	200	Jr.	Spring Valley, California	USC
RB	Jerome Harrison	5'10"	199	Sr.	Kalamazoo, Michigan	Washington State
WR	Dwayne Jarrett	6'5"	210	So.	New Brunswick, New Jersey	USC
WR	Jeff Samardzija	6'5"	218	Jr.	Valparaiso, Indiana	Notre Dame
TE	Marcedes Lewis	6'6"	256	Sr.	Lakewood, California	UCLA
T	Jonathan Scott	6'7"	315	Sr.	Dallas, Texas	Texas
T	Marcus McNeill	6'9"	338	Sr.	Decatur, Georgia	Auburn
G	Deuce Lutui	6'6"	370	Sr.	Mesa, Arizona	USC
G	Max Jean-Gilles	6'4"	355	Sr.	North Miami Beach, Florida	Georgia
C	Greg Eslinger	6'3"	292	Sr.	Bismarck, North Dakota	Minnesota

Defense
Position	Name	Height	Weight (lbs.)	Class	Hometown	Team
DE	Tamba Hali	6'3"	275	Sr.	Teaneck, New Jersey	Penn State
DT	Haloti Ngata	6'4"	338	Sr.	Salt Lake City, Utah	Oregon
DT	Rodrique Wright	6'5"	315	Sr.	Houston, Texas	Texas
DE	Elvis Dumervil	6'0"	256	Sr.	Miami, Florida	Louisville
LB	A. J. Hawk	6'1"	248	Sr.	Centerville, Ohio	Ohio State
LB	DeMeco Ryans	6'1"	236	Sr.	Bessemer, Alabama	Alabama
LB	Paul Posluszny	6'2"	238	Jr.	Hopewell Township, Pennsylvania	Penn State
CB	Jimmy Williams	6'3"	216	Sr.	Hampton, Virginia	Virginia Tech
CB	Tye Hill	5'10"	185	Sr.	Dorchester, South Carolina	Clemson
Safety	Michael Huff	6'0"	204	Sr.	Irving, Texas	Texas
Safety	Greg Blue	6'2"	216	Sr.	Atlanta	Georgia

Special teams
Position	Name	Height	Weight (lbs.)	Class	Hometown	Team
Kicker	Mason Crosby	6'2"	215	Jr.	Georgetown, Texas	Colorado
Punter	Ryan Plackemeier	6'3"	235	Sr.	Bonsall, California	Wake Forest
RS	Maurice Drew	5'8"	205	Jr.	Antioch, California	UCLA

=== Highest-scoring team ===
Texas scored the most points (652).

== Attendances ==
#	Team	G	Total	Average
1	Michigan	7	776,405	110,915
2	Tennessee	6	645,558	107,593
3	Ohio State	7	735,120	105,017
4	Penn State	7	734,013	104,859
5	Georgia	6	556,206	92,701
6	LSU	6	549,480	91,580
7	Southern California	6	544,872	90,812
8	Florida	6	542,435	90,406
9	Oklahoma	6	505,984	84,331
10	Auburn	7	589,124	84,161
11	Texas	5	416,663	83,333
12	Florida State	6	496,343	82,724
13	Wisconsin	6	495,308	82,551
14	Alabama	7	567,126	81,018
15	Notre Dame	6	484,770	80,795
16	South Carolina	7	559,071	79,867
17	Texas A&M	6	478,389	79,732
18	Clemson	6	469,391	78,232
19	Nebraska	7	542,397	77,485
20	Michigan State	6	451,097	75,183
21	Iowa	6	423,510	70,585
22	Virginia Tech	6	390,690	65,115
23	Washington	6	385,957	64,326
24	UCLA	6	385,305	64,218
25	Arkansas	6	382,070	63,678
26	Purdue	6	377,977	62,996
27	Kentucky	6	374,697	62,450
28	Arizona State	7	428,096	61,157
29	Virginia	6	365,836	60,973
30	California	6	362,263	60,377
31	Oregon	6	350,602	58,434
32	BYU	6	349,222	58,204
33	West Virginia	6	337,720	56,287
34	Mississippi	6	325,348	54,225
35	Arizona	6	321,676	53,613
36	Missouri	6	320,181	53,364
37	North Carolina State	7	370,476	52,925
38	Maryland	5	262,129	52,426
39	North Carolina	6	310,000	51,667
40	Georgia Tech	6	309,644	51,607
41	Texas Tech	7	356,802	50,972
42	Colorado	6	302,452	50,409
43	Minnesota	6	294,147	49,025
44	UTEP	6	287,394	47,899
45	Illinois	6	287,113	47,852
46	Mississippi State	6	286,127	47,688
47	Iowa State	6	280,232	46,705
48	Kansas State	6	275,767	45,961
49	Miami Hurricanes	6	271,862	45,310
50	Oklahoma State	6	269,163	44,861
51	Kansas	6	262,051	43,675
52	Stanford	6	261,301	43,550
53	Oregon State	6	253,140	42,190
54	Utah	6	249,215	41,536
55	Louisville	6	246,007	41,001
56	Pittsburgh	6	241,630	40,272
57	Syracuse	6	241,510	40,252
58	Connecticut	6	240,000	40,000
59	Memphis	6	239,946	39,991
60	Indiana	6	237,214	39,536
61	Boston College	6	236,572	39,429
62	Fresno State	6	235,839	39,307
63	Baylor	5	194,493	38,899
64	South Florida	5	194,325	38,865
65	New Mexico	5	191,707	38,341
66	San Diego State	6	217,339	36,223
67	Vanderbilt	6	216,187	36,031
68	Air Force	5	179,906	35,981
69	Rutgers	6	199,101	33,184
70	East Carolina	5	165,230	33,046
71	Navy	5	165,066	33,013
72	Hawaii	7	229,142	32,735
73	Northwestern	6	195,163	32,527
74	TCU	5	156,268	31,254
75	Washington State	5	155,547	31,109
76	Army	6	185,611	30,935
77	Boise State	7	210,781	30,112
78	Colorado State	5	146,737	29,347
79	Wake Forest	6	173,544	28,924
80	UCF	5	142,311	28,462
81	Southern Miss	5	139,312	27,862
82	Marshall	6	159,062	26,510
83	Tulsa	5	114,132	22,826
84	Cincinnati	5	112,113	22,423
85	Northern Illinois	5	110,880	22,176
86	Toledo	5	109,086	21,817
87	Wyoming	5	103,252	20,650
88	UAB	5	100,506	20,101
89	UNLV	5	99,570	19,914
90	Troy	5	97,125	19,425
91	Western Michigan	5	94,530	18,906
92	SMU	6	111,780	18,630
93	Arkansas State	6	110,288	18,381
94	Ohio	5	90,167	18,033
95	Louisiana-Lafayette	5	87,957	17,591
96	Duke	6	104,915	17,486
97	North Texas	5	82,232	16,446
98	Louisiana Tech	5	82,080	16,416
99	Central Michigan	5	79,855	15,971
100	Miami RedHawks	5	76,203	15,241
101	Idaho	4	60,700	15,175
102	Nevada	6	90,458	15,076
103	Houston	6	90,324	15,054
104	Bowling Green	5	74,644	14,929
105	Louisiana-Monroe	5	73,084	14,617
106	Middle Tennessee	5	72,629	14,526
107	Tulane	6	85,450	14,242
108	Ball State	4	51,810	12,953
109	Temple	5	63,674	12,735
110	New Mexico State	6	75,339	12,557
111	San Jose State	5	62,529	12,506
112	Utah State	5	54,482	10,896
113	Akron	5	54,464	10,893
114	Rice	5	50,362	10,072
115	Buffalo	5	44,572	8,914
116	Kent State	5	33,292	6,658
117	Eastern Michigan	4	20,874	5,219
