= 2005 Tulane Green Wave football team =

American college football season

2005 Tulane Green Wave football
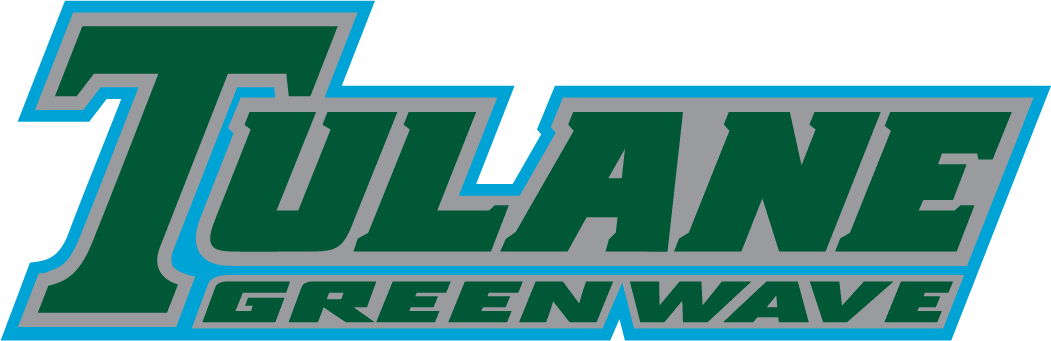
- Conference: Conference USA
- West Division
- Record: 2–9 (1–7 C-USA)
- Head coach: Chris Scelfo (7th season)
- Offensive coordinator: Frank Scelfo (5th season)
- Offensive scheme: Multiple
- Defensive coordinator: Eric Schumann (4th season)
- Base defense: 4–3
- Home stadium: "Home" games played at various sites in Louisiana and Alabama

2005 Conference USA football standings
	Conf.			Overall
Team	W		L	W		L
East Division
UCF x	7	–	1	8	–	5
Southern Miss	5	–	3	7	–	5
Memphis	5	–	3	7	–	5
East Carolina	4	–	4	5	–	6
Marshall	3	–	5	4	–	7
UAB	3	–	5	5	–	6
West Division
Tulsa x$	6	–	2	9	–	4
UTEP	5	–	3	8	–	4
Houston	4	–	4	6	–	6
SMU	4	–	4	5	–	6
Tulane	1	–	7	2	–	9
Rice	1	–	7	1	–	10
Championship: Tulsa 44, UCF 27
$ – Conference champion; x – Division champion/co-champions; Rankings from AP Poll

The 2005 Tulane Green Wave football team represented Tulane University in the 2005 NCAA Division I-A football season. Their home stadium, the Louisiana Superdome, was damaged by Hurricane Katrina in August 2005 and forced the Green Wave to play the entire season on the road with "home" games being played at five different stadiums in Louisiana and one in Alabama. They competed in the West Division of Conference USA. The team was coached by head coach Chris Scelfo.

== Schedule ==
Date	Time	Opponent	Site	TV	Result	Attendance	Source
September 17	7:00 pm	vs. Mississippi State*	Independence Stadium; Shreveport, LA	CSTV	L 14–21	16,421	
September 24	7:00 pm	at SMU	Gerald J. Ford Stadium; Dallas, TX		W 31–10	15,681	
October 1	2:30 pm	vs. Southeastern Louisiana*	Tiger Stadium; Baton Rouge, LA		W 28–21	16,826	
October 8	5:00 pm	vs. Houston	Cajun Field; Lafayette, LA	iTV	L 14–35	15,454	
October 14	7:00 pm	vs. UTEP	Joe Aillet Stadium; Ruston, LA	ESPN	L 21–45	13,153	
October 21	6:00 pm	at UCF	Florida Citrus Bowl; Orlando, FL	CSTV	L 24–34	15,009	
October 29	6:00 pm	vs. Marshall	Ladd–Peebles Stadium; Mobile, AL	CSTV	L 26–27	13,290	
November 5	12:30 pm	at Navy*	Navy–Marine Corps Memorial Stadium; Annapolis, MD	CSTV	L 21–49	33,608	
November 12	2:00 pm	at Rice	Rice Stadium; Houston, TX		L 34–42	9,162	
November 19	1:00 pm	vs. Tulsa	Malone Stadium; Monroe, LA		L 14–38	10,306	
November 26	2:00 pm	at Southern Miss	M. M. Roberts Stadium; Hattiesburg, MS (Battle for the Bell)		L 7–26	28,730	
*Non-conference game; All times are in Central time

== Roster ==
2005 Tulane Green Wave football team roster
Players			Coaches
Offense: Pos. / # / Name / Class; QB / 6 / Nick Cannon / Jr	Defense: Pos. / # / Name / Class; LB / 11 / Anthony Cannon / Sr	Special teams: Pos. / # / Name / Class	Head coach: Chris Scelfo; Coordinators/assistant coaches Legend: (C) Team captain; (S) Suspended; (I) Ineligible; Injured; Redshirt; Roster
