= Coug it =

Tendency of the Washington State Cougars football team to lose games via choking

To "Coug it" is a tendency of the Washington State University Cougars football team to lose games via late-game collapses, odds-defying losses, "snatching defeat from the jaws of victory", and otherwise choking.

The tendency has been observed since at least the 1983 season and the phrase appeared in the 1984 edition of Chinook, the WSU yearbook. The concept was then popularized as "to Coug" by sportswriter John Blanchette in his Spokesman-Review column following the 1985 Cougars' 16–21 home loss to Arizona State in which they outgained the Sun Devils 445 yards to 217.

Couging it has been a part of WSU athletics culture for decades and the concept is frequently referenced in Pacific Northwest news media following a particularly embarrassing or surprising loss by the Cougars. Washington State University administrators have run internal and external campaigns to downplay the concept, and coaches, fans, and players have sought to reclaim the phrase via on-field success.

== Football ==
The Cougs were said to have Coug'd it by media outlets in the following college football games.

Season	Opponent	Result	Notes
1975	Washington	L 27–28	WSU led 27–14 with three minutes to go at the UW 14 yard line, then gave up a 93-yard interception return on 4th and 1, and then a 78-yard touchdown pass that bounced off Cougar defenders before being caught by Husky WR Spider Gaines. Head coach Jim Sweeney resigns after the game.
1983	UCLA	L 14–24	"heart-breaker loss" that "took the joy out of being a Cougar."
1984	UCLA	L 24–27	Botched snap on a late-game field goal bounced deep into Cougar territory and allowed the Bruins to win the game with their own field goal.
1985	Arizona State	L 16–21	Phrase "to Coug" popularized.
2001	Washington	L 14–26	WSU entered the Apple Cup with a 9–1 record and No. 9 ranking. Lost 14-26 that included three first and goal opportunities that resulted in zero points (Turnover on downs, fumble and interception.)
2002	Washington	L 26–29^{3OT}	No. 3 Cougars led 20–10 with 4:30 left. Huskies won in 3OT after recovering a controversial backwards-pass fumble, also winning the "Northwest Championship".
2003	Notre Dame	L 26–29^{OT}	First ever game vs. Notre Dame. Led 19–0. Allowed 26 unanswered points in second half.
2003	Washington	L 19–27	No. 8 WSU lead all game until UW went up 20–19 with 1:10 left to play. Rather than driving down the field to win the game, WSU QB Matt Kegel threw a pick-six interception to Marquis Cooper. Cougars gave up seven turnovers.
2005	California	L 38–42	Losing 28–10 at halftime; scored 28 unanswered points to lead 38–28. But then allowed two Cal touchdowns in final minutes.
2012	Colorado	L 34–35	Led by 17 points last seven minutes, then gave up 3 touchdowns. 1–11 Colorado's only win of the season.
2013	Colorado State	L 45–48	2013 New Mexico Bowl. WSU led by 15 points in the final minutes of the game.
2014	California	L 59–60	QB Connor Halliday sets NCAA FBS single-game passing record with 734 yards. Missed 19 yard go-ahead field goal with 15 seconds remaining.
2015	Portland State	L 17–24	Loss to an FCS team.
2016	Eastern Washington	L 42–45	Second consecutive loss to an FCS team. EWU's official Twitter account posted that their team "Eaged it."
2019	UCLA	L 63–67	Led 49–17 in the 3rd quarter. Gave up 50 second-half points.
2020	Utah	L 28-45	WSU led 28–7 at halftime. Gave up 38 unanswered points in the second-half.
2022	Oregon	L 41–44	Led 34–22 with 4 minutes remaining, then allowed 22 unanswered points.
2024	New Mexico	L 35–38	No. 18 Cougars, with the opportunity to make the College Football Playoff as favorites in the rest of their games, lead the Lobos 28–14 at halftime. The Lobos would outscore the Cougars 24–7 in the second half to win. This started a season-ending four game losing streak.
2025	Virginia	L 20–22	WSU led no. 18 UVA 17–7 at halftime and held on with 20–10 at the end of the third quarter. Then, in the final quarter, UVA made a 97-yard touchdown drive, picked WSU's next attempt and scored a field goal to tie the game. After a kickoff to the 2-yard line and 2 consecutive Cougar false-starts, the Cavaliers forced a safety to pull ahead, and the Cougars were unable to prevent them running out the clock.
2026	Utah State	L 16–17	Led 16-3 at halftime. Fumbles by WSU QB Caden Pinnick in the third quarter and TE Jack Pedersen in the fourth quarter were both recovered by the Utah State defense and turned into touchdown scoring drives. The WSU offense did not score in the second half. This was WSU's second "Coug" against head coach Bronco Mendenhall, the first being the 2024 game when he was the head coach at New Mexico.

The phrase is also used for embarrassing actions outside of game results, such as naming Martin Stadium after a Husky.

== Attempted reappropriation ==
WSU fans, players, and coaches have sought to reclaim the phrase.

In 1997 quarterback Ryan Leaf said "It's fun to change the definition of something that was supposed to be so negative." in the week prior to losing their first game of the season to Arizona State by blowing a 24–0 lead and giving up two fumbles for touchdowns in the final 3 minutes of the game.

In 2005 head coach Bill Doba defined "Coug it" as "scoring at the end and winning the ballgame" in response to a reporter's question following a 38–42 loss to Cal in which the Cougars "came from behind to lose".

At the Pac-12 Football Media Day in 2014, team captain Darryl Monroe said "I don’t understand where this impression of Coug'd it means you did something in a negative light" when asked about the team's collapse in the final minutes of the 2013 New Mexico Bowl. "Coug'd it means completely dominated your opponent."
