= 2005 Washington State Cougars football team =

American college football season

2005 Washington State Cougars football
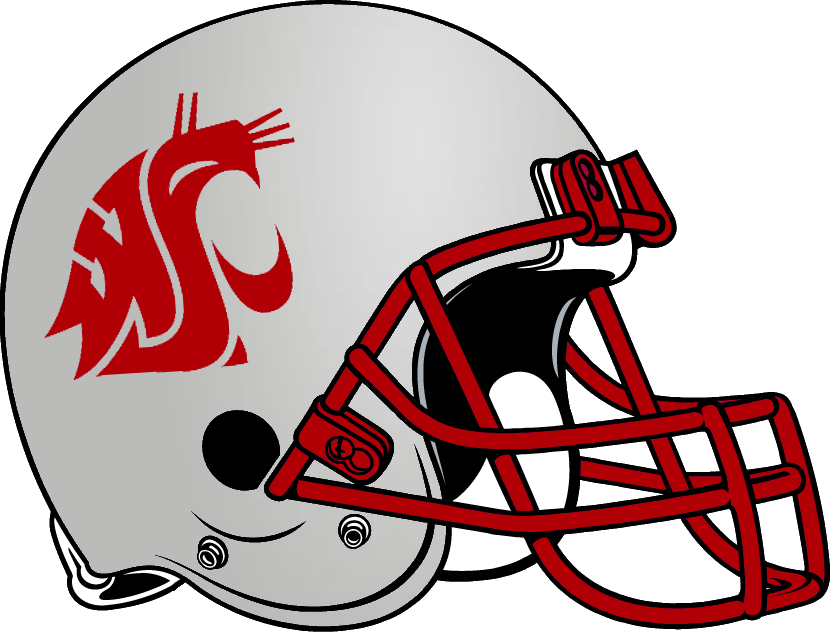
- Conference: Pacific-10 Conference
- Record: 4–7 (1–7 Pac-10)
- Head coach: Bill Doba (3rd season)
- Offensive coordinator: Mike Levenseller (5th season)
- Offensive scheme: Spread
- Defensive coordinator: Robb Akey (3rd season)
- Base defense: 4–3
- Home stadium: Martin Stadium

2005 Pacific-10 Conference football standings
	Conf.			Overall
Team	W		L	W		L
No. 2 USC † $	8	–	0	12	–	1
No. 13 Oregon	7	–	1	10	–	2
No. 16 UCLA	6	–	2	10	–	2
No. 25 California	4	–	4	8	–	4
Arizona State	4	–	4	7	–	5
Stanford	4	–	4	5	–	6
Oregon State	3	–	5	5	–	6
Arizona	2	–	6	3	–	8
Washington State	1	–	7	4	–	7
Washington	1	–	7	2	–	9
$ – Conference champion; † – USC later vacated 12 wins (8 in conference) and 1 loss due to NCAA sanctions.; Rankings from AP Poll

The 2005 Washington State Cougars football team represented Washington State University in the Pacific-10 Conference during the 2005 NCAA Division I-A football season. Led by third-year head coach Bill Doba, WSU played its home games at on campus Martin Stadium in Pullman, with one at Qwest Field in Seattle.

== Season ==
Washington State was picked fifth in the pre-season Pac-10 conference poll. They were even classified by some as a sleeper pick for the national championship, with Alex Brink at the helm. They opened with three non-conference wins in September, but the results were different in league play. In the Pac-10 opener at Oregon State, Brink passed for over 500 yards, but WSU lost by eleven.

The Cougars lost their next three games (Stanford, UCLA, Cal), by a combined ten points; their inability to close out games cost them. After a blowout loss in Los Angeles to top-ranked USC, three-point setbacks at home to Arizona State and #11 Oregon followed, as the conference losing streak extended to seven games. In the Apple Cup at Seattle, they defeated struggling rival Washington by four points to finish at 4–7 overall.

== Schedule ==
Date	Time	Opponent	Site	TV	Result	Attendance
September 1	7:00 pm	Idaho*	Martin Stadium; Pullman, Washington (Battle of the Palouse)	FSNNW	W 38–26	28,339
September 9	7:00 pm	at Nevada*	Mackay Stadium; Reno, Nevada	ESPN	W 55–27	17,552
September 17	4:00 pm	Grambling State*	Qwest Field; Seattle (Cougar Gridiron Classic)		W 48–7	51,486
October 1	1:00 pm	at Oregon State	Reser Stadium; Corvallis, Oregon		L 33–44	42,908
October 8	2:00 pm	Stanford	Martin Stadium; Pullman, Washington		L 21–24	33,442
October 15	3:30 pm	No. 11 UCLA^{†}	Martin Stadium; Pullman, Washington	FSN	L 41–44 ^{OT}	35,117
October 22	7:15 pm	at No. 25 California	California Memorial Stadium; Berkeley, California	FSN	L 38–42	52,569
October 29	12:30 pm	at No. 1 USC	Los Angeles Memorial Coliseum; Los Angeles	ABC	L 13–55	92,021
November 5	2:00 pm	Arizona State	Martin Stadium; Pullman, Washington		L 24–27	31,054
November 12	7:15 pm	No. 11 Oregon	Martin Stadium; Pullman, Washington	FSNNW	L 31–34	27,595
November 19	12:15 pm	at Washington	Husky Stadium; Seattle (Apple Cup)	FSN	W 26–22	70,713
*Non-conference game; ^{†}Homecoming; Rankings from AP Poll released prior to the game; All times are in Pacific time

== Game summaries ==
=== Washington ===
Team	1	2	3	4	Total
• Washington State	10	3	6	7	26
Washington	7	0	7	8	22

- Date: November 19
- Location: Husky Stadium • Seattle
- Game start: 12:15 p.m. PST

Scoring summary
1	8:15	WSU	Greg Prator 30 yard pass from Alex Brink (Loren Langley kick)	Wash St 7-0
1	6:37	WASH	Sonny Shackelford 65 yard pass from Kenny James (Evan Knudson kick)	Tie 7-7
1	1:59	WSU	Loren Langley 22 yard field goal	Wash St 10-7
2	1:50	WSU	Loren Langley 48 yard field goal	Wash St 13-7
3	7:41	WSH	Craig Chambers 16 yard pass from Isaiah Stanback (Evan Knudson kick)	Wash 14-13
3	2:53	WSU	Jerome Harrison 19 yard run (pass failed)	Wash St 19-14
4	14:50	WASH	James Sims Jr. 3 yard run (Anthony Russo pass from Isaiah Stanback)	Wash 22-19
4	1:20	WSU	Trandon Harvey 39 yard pass from Alex Brink (Graham Siderius kick)	Wash St 26-22
