= 2005 Washington Huskies football team =

American college football season

2005 Washington Huskies football
- Conference: Pacific-10
- Record: 2–9 (1–7 Pac-10)
- Head coach: Tyrone Willingham (1st season)
- Offensive coordinator: Tim Lappano (1st season)
- Offensive scheme: Spread
- Defensive coordinator: Kent Baer (1st season)
- Base defense: 4–3
- MVPs: James Sims (O); Joe Lobendahn (D)
- Captains: Evan Benjamin; Joe Lobendahn; James Sims; Brad Vanneman
- Home stadium: Husky Stadium

2005 Pacific-10 Conference football standings
	Conf.			Overall
Team	W		L	W		L
No. 2 USC † $	8	–	0	12	–	1
No. 13 Oregon	7	–	1	10	–	2
No. 16 UCLA	6	–	2	10	–	2
No. 25 California	4	–	4	8	–	4
Arizona State	4	–	4	7	–	5
Stanford	4	–	4	5	–	6
Oregon State	3	–	5	5	–	6
Arizona	2	–	6	3	–	8
Washington State	1	–	7	4	–	7
Washington	1	–	7	2	–	9
$ – Conference champion; † – USC later vacated 12 wins (8 in conference) and 1 loss due to NCAA sanctions.; Rankings from AP Poll

The 2005 Washington Huskies football team represented the University of Washington in the 2005 NCAA Division I FBS football season. Led by first-year head coach Tyrone Willingham, the team compiled a 2–9 record and tied for last in the Pacific-10 Conference. Home games were played on campus at Husky Stadium in Seattle. The conference opponent not played this season was Stanford.

Willingham was previously the head coach for three seasons at Notre Dame, preceded by seven years at Stanford.

== Schedule ==
Date	Time	Opponent	Site	TV	Result	Attendance
September 3	12:30 p.m.	Air Force*	Qwest Field; Seattle, WA	ABC	L 17–20	26,482
September 10	12:30 p.m.	No. 16 California	Husky Stadium; Seattle, WA	ABC	L 17–56	57,775
September 17	12:30 p.m.	Idaho*	Husky Stadium; Seattle, WA		W 34–6	61,183
September 24	12:30 p.m.	No. 16 Notre Dame*	Husky Stadium; Seattle, WA	ABC	L 17–36	71,473
October 1	7:15 p.m.	at No. 20 UCLA	Rose Bowl; Pasadena, CA	FSN	L 17–21	64,269
October 15	12:30 p.m.	at No. 20 Oregon	Autzen Stadium; Eugene, OR (rivalry)		L 21–45	58,269
October 22	12:30 p.m.	No. 1 USC	Husky Stadium; Seattle, WA	ABC	L 24–51	64,096
October 29	3:30 p.m.	at Arizona State	Sun Devil Stadium; Tempe, AZ	FSN	L 20–44	57,678
November 5	3:30 p.m.	Oregon State^{†}	Husky Stadium; Seattle, WA	FSN	L 10–18	60,717
November 12	3:00 p.m.	at Arizona	Arizona Stadium; Tucson, AZ		W 38–14	52,505
November 19	12:15 p.m.	Washington State	Husky Stadium; Seattle, WA (Apple Cup)	FSN	L 22–26	70,713
*Non-conference game; ^{†}Homecoming; Rankings from AP Poll released prior to the game; All times are in Pacific time

== Roster ==
2005 Washington Huskies football team roster
Players
Coaches
Offense

Pos.	#	Name	Class
OT	67	Joe Toledo	Sr

Defense

Pos.	#	Name	Class
SS	19	Mesphin Forrester	Fr
CB	6	Matt Fountaine	Jr
SS	1	C. J. Wallace	Jr

Special teams

Pos.	#	Name	Class

Head coach

- Tyrone Willingham (1st year)

Coordinators/assistant coaches

Legend

- (C) Team captain
- (S) Suspended
- (I) Ineligible
- Injured
- Redshirt

Roster

== NFL draft ==
One Husky was selected in the 2006 NFL draft, which lasted seven rounds (255 selections).

Player	Position	Round	Overall	Franchise
Joe Toledo	T	4th	114	Miami Dolphins
