= 2005 Holiday Bowl =

2005 Pacific Life Holiday Bowl
Oregon Ducks	Oklahoma Sooners
(10–1)	(7–4)
Pac-10	Big 12
14	17
Head coach: Mike Bellotti	Head coach: Bob Stoops
AP / Coaches / BCS; 6 / 5 / 5	BCS 23
	1	2	3	4	Total
Oregon	7	0	0	7	14
Oklahoma	3	0	14	0	17
- Date: December 29, 2005
- Season: 2005
- Stadium: Qualcomm Stadium
- Location: San Diego, California
- MVP: Offensive: Rhett Bomar, Oklahoma; Co-Defensive: Anthony Trucks, Oregon; Co-Defensive: C.J. Ah You, Oklahoma
- Referee: Bill LeMonnier (Big Ten)
- Attendance: 65,416
- Payout: US$2,130,955 per team

United States TV coverage
- Network: ESPN
- Announcers: Keith Jackson and Dan Fouts

The 2005 Holiday Bowl was a college football bowl game. The game was held at Qualcomm Stadium in San Diego, California, on December 29, 2005, with the Big 12 Conference's Oklahoma Sooners defeating the Pacific-10 Conference's Oregon Ducks, 17–14.

== Team selection ==
The Ducks were playing to show that they deserved a BCS bowl bid, having gone 10–1 during the regular season (the only loss coming to the nation's top-ranked team, Southern California), while the Sooners, who had lost in the BCS championship game each of the past two years, were trying to show that they really were the team that came into the season ranked fifth in the USA Today coaches' poll and seventh in the AP writers' poll than the team that lost to Texas by 33.

== Game summary ==
Although Oregon got off to an early 7–3 lead and held that lead for nearly half the game, 22:38, the offense was unable to muster much against an Oklahoma defense that recorded four sacks (two by junior defensive end C.J. Ah You), held the Ducks to 2.6 yards per carry, and allowed only six third-down conversions in 18 attempts.

Rotating between Dennis Dixon and Brady Leaf (whose brother, Ryan, was once the quarterback for the San Diego Chargers and played in said stadium) at quarterback, as they had done since losing starter Kellen Clemens earlier in the year, the Ducks gained 244 passing yards on 44 attempts, but much of that came in the fourth quarter as the Sooners defense tired during two extended drives. Oregon managed little success on the ground, with their top rusher, senior Terrence Whitehead, going for only 42 yards. Oklahoma's offense played largely efficiently, gaining 365 yards, with redshirt freshman quarterback Rhett Bomar completing 59 percent of his passes for 229 yards and one touchdown (freshman Malcolm Kelly was the team's top receiver, hauling in seven Bomar throws for 78 yards). Sophomore Adrian Peterson led the way on the ground, accumulating 79 yards on 23 carries.

In spite of their general success, Bomar and Peterson each provided Oregon hope, with Bomar throwing an interception and Peterson fumbling within a yard of the goal line. The Ducks, trailing by 10 points in the fourth quarter, were unable to convert a first-down in the shadow of their own goal posts against the aggressive Sooners defense and thus failed to capitalize on the Peterson turnover. Their defense, though, stymied every Oklahoma drive in the fourth quarter, getting two more possessions for the offense, and Oregon drove 81 yards in 14 plays, with Brady Leaf hitting Tim Day for a three-yard touchdown. Once more the Sooners offense failed to convert a third-down on their ensuing possession as the Ducks defense tightened, and behind a resurgent Leaf, Oregon drove to the Oklahoma 19-yard-line before Sooners senior linebacker Clint Ingram intercepted a Leaf pass to seal the victory for the Sooners.

=== Scoring Summary ===
Scoring summary

Quarter	Time	Drive			Team	Scoring information	Score	
Quarter	Time	Plays	Yards	TOP	Team	Scoring information	ORE	OKLA
1	8:04	7	44	1:59	OKLA	34-yard field goal by Garrett Hartley	0	3
1	2:58	12	79	5:06	ORE	Demetrius Williams 6-yard touchdown run, Paul Martinez kick good	7	3
3	9:20	4	53	2:07	OKLA	J. D. Runnels 16-yard touchdown reception from Rhett Bomar, Garrett Hartley kick good	7	10
3	3:25	9	74	4:09	OKLA	Kejuan Jones 8-yard touchdown run, Garrett Hartley kick good	7	17
4	3:30	13	78	3:43	ORE	Tim Day 3-yard touchdown reception from Brady Leaf, Paul Martinez kick good	14	17
"TOP" = time of possession. For other American football terms, see Glossary of American football.							14	17

=== Statistics ===
Statistics	ORE	OKLA
First downs	17	19
Total yards	327	357
Rushes–yards	32–84	40–128
Passing yards	262	229
Passing: Comp–Att–Int	25–44–1	17–30–1
Time of possession	19:23	17:17
