= 2005 Oregon Ducks football team =

American college football season

2005 Oregon Ducks football

Holiday Bowl, L 14–17 vs Oklahoma
- Conference: Pacific-10 Conference

Ranking
- Coaches: No. 12
- AP: No. 13
- Record: 10–2 (7–1 Pac-10)
- Head coach: Mike Bellotti (11th season)
- Offensive coordinator: Gary Crowton (1st season)
- Offensive scheme: Spread
- Defensive coordinator: Nick Aliotti (9th season)
- Base defense: 4–3
- Captain: Game captains
- Home stadium: Autzen Stadium

2005 Pacific-10 Conference football standings
| | Conf. | | | Overall |
| Team | W | | L | W | | L |
|---|---|---|---|---|---|---|
| No. 2 USC † $ | 8 | – | 0 | 12 | – | 1 |
| No. 13 Oregon | 7 | – | 1 | 10 | – | 2 |
| No. 16 UCLA | 6 | – | 2 | 10 | – | 2 |
| No. 25 California | 4 | – | 4 | 8 | – | 4 |
| Arizona State | 4 | – | 4 | 7 | – | 5 |
| Stanford | 4 | – | 4 | 5 | – | 6 |
| Oregon State | 3 | – | 5 | 5 | – | 6 |
| Arizona | 2 | – | 6 | 3 | – | 8 |
| Washington State | 1 | – | 7 | 4 | – | 7 |
| Washington | 1 | – | 7 | 2 | – | 9 |
$ – Conference champion; † – USC later vacated 12 wins (8 in conference) and 1 loss due to NCAA sanctions.; Rankings from AP Poll

The 2005 Oregon Ducks football team represented the University of Oregon as a member of the Pacific-10 Conference (Pac-10) during the 2005 NCAA Division I-A football season. Led by 11th-year head coach Mike Bellotti, the Ducks compiled an overall record of 10–2 with a mark of 7–1 in conference play, placing second in the Pac-10. The team played home games at Autzen Stadium in Eugene, Oregon.

In 2005, Oregon had success behind senior quarterback Kellen Clemens and a new spread offense. During a game at Arizona, Clemens suffered a broken ankle. At that point Oregon was 8–1 with their only loss to top-ranked USC, 45–13, and still in the hunt for a Bowl Championship Series BCS bowl game. Oregon won their final three games and their success led them into contention for a bid to the Fiesta Bowl. The Ducks finished the regular season with a 10–1 record, their best finish since their Joey Harrington-led, Fiesta Bowl-winning 2001 team. They finished fifth overall in the BCS ranking system, which would in many years have been high enough to earn them a bid to a BCS bowl. In 2005, however, there were no at-large bids available to Oregon. Ohio State finished just ahead of the Ducks, in fourth place, guaranteeing them one of the at-large berths, although they had an inferior 10–2 record. Notre Dame finished sixth in the BCS, also securing a BCS bid due to a pre-existing clause in the BCS contract. Many college football fans were outraged that two teams with worse records were selected over the Ducks. Moreover, for the second consecutive year, the Pac-10 conference had a team that finished with a one-loss season snubbed by the BCS; the 2004 California Golden Bears football team finished 10–1. It was later demonstrated that Oregon drew the highest bowl ratings in college football, calling the argument that TV ratings hurt the Ducks' BCS chances into question. Instead of a BCS game, the Ducks were assigned to the Holiday Bowl versus the Oklahoma Sooners. Playing without Clemens, the Ducks fell in a close game, 17–14.

== Schedule ==
| Date | Time | Opponent | Rank | Site | TV | Result | Attendance | Source |
|---|---|---|---|---|---|---|---|---|
| September 1 | 4:00 pm | at Houston* | | Reliant Stadium; Houston, TX | ESPN2 | W 38–24 | 19,981 | |
| September 10 | 12:30 pm | Montana* | | Autzen Stadium; Eugene, OR | | W 47–14 | 58,169 | |
| September 17 | 4:00 pm | No. 23 Fresno State* | | Autzen Stadium; Eugene, Oregon | TBS | W 37–34 | 58,201 | |
| September 24 | 4:00 pm | No. 1 USC | No. 24 | Autzen Stadium; Eugene, OR (rivalry) | ABC | L 13–45 | 59,129 | |
| October 1 | 2:00 pm | at Stanford | | Stanford Stadium; Stanford, CA (rivalry) | | W 44–20 | 27,690 | |
| October 8 | 7:15 pm | at No. 17 Arizona State | No. 25 | Sun Devil Stadium; Tempe, AZ | FSN | W 31–17 | 62,789 | |
| October 15 | 12:30 pm | Washington | No. 20 | Autzen Stadium; Eugene, OR (rivalry) | | W 45–21 | 58,269 | |
| October 22 | 4:00 pm | at Arizona | No. 15 | Arizona Stadium; Tucson, AZ | | W 28–21 | 48,052 | |
| November 5 | 12:30 pm | No. 23 California | No. 15 | Autzen Stadium; Eugene, OR | ABC | W 27–20 ^{OT} | 58,309 | |
| November 12 | 7:15 pm | at Washington State | No. 11 | Martin Stadium; Pullman, WA | FSN | W 34–31 | 27,595 | |
| November 19 | 3:45 pm | Oregon State | No. 10 | Autzen Stadium; Eugene, OR (Civil War) | FSN | W 56–14 | 58,525 | |
| December 29 | 5:00 pm | vs. Oklahoma* | No. 6 | Qualcomm Stadium; San Diego, CA (Holiday Bowl) | ESPN | L 14–17 | 65,416 | |
*Non-conference game; Rankings from AP Poll released prior to the game; All times are in Pacific time

== Rankings ==
Ranking movements Legend: ██ Increase in ranking ██ Decrease in ranking RV = Received votes
| | Week | | | | | | | | | | | | | | | |
| Poll | Pre | 1 | 2 | 3 | 4 | 5 | 6 | 7 | 8 | 9 | 10 | 11 | 12 | 13 | 14 | Final |
|---|---|---|---|---|---|---|---|---|---|---|---|---|---|---|---|---|
| AP | RV | RV | RV | 24 | RV | 25 | 20 | 15 | 14 | 15 | 11 | 10 | 8 | 8 | 6 | 13 |
| Coaches | RV | RV | RV | RV | RV | RV | 21 | 16 | 14 | 13 | 11 | 10 | 8 | 8 | 5 | 12 |
| Harris | Not released | | | | RV | RV | 20 | 16 | 14 | 13 | 11 | 10 | 8 | 8 | 6 | Not released |
| BCS | Not released | | | | | | | 13 | 11 | 13 | 10 | 10 | 7 | 7 | 5 | Not released |

== Game summaries ==
=== Stanford ===
| Team | 1 | 2 | 3 | 4 | Total |
|---|---|---|---|---|---|
| • Oregon | 7 | 14 | 17 | 6 | 44 |
| Stanford | 10 | 3 | 0 | 7 | 20 |

- Date: October 1
- Location: Stanford Stadium, Stanford, California
- Game start: 5:00 p.m. EST
- Source: ESPN

Scoring summary
| 1 | 4:48 | Stanford | Michael Sgroi 42-yard field goal | Stanford 3-0 |
| 1 | 2:08 | Oregon | Jonathan Stewart 11-yard pass from Kellen Clemens (Paul Martinez kick) | Oregon 7-3 |
| 1 | :04 | Stanford | Mark Bradford 2-yard pass from Trent Edwards (Michael Sgroi kick) | Stanford 10-7 |
| 2 | 13:23 | Oregon | Dante Rosario 18-yard pass from Kellen Clemens (Paul Martinez kick) | Oregon 14-10 |
| 2 | 4:41 | Oregon | Jaison Williams 19-yard pass from Kellen Clemens (Paul Martinez kick) | Oregon 21-10 |
| 2 | :06 | Stanford | Michael Sgroi 31-yard field goal | Oregon 21-13 |
| 3 | 8:25 | Oregon | Jonathan Stewart 1-yard run (Paul Martinez kick) | Oregon 28-13 |
| 3 | 4:48 | Oregon | Jonathan Stewart 1-yard run (Paul Martinez kick) | Oregon 35-13 |
| 3 | 3:29 | Oregon | Paul Martinez 44-yard field goal | Oregon 38-13 |
| 4 | 8:45 | Oregon | Jeremiah Johnson 5-yard run (kick blocked) | Oregon 44-13 |
| 4 | 3:56 | Stanford | Jon Alston 10-yard blocked punt return (Michael Sgroi kick) | Oregon 44-20 |

== Personnel ==
=== Recruiting ===
College recruiting
| Name | Hometown | School | Height | Weight | 40^{‡} | Commit date |
|---|---|---|---|---|---|---|
| Jonathan Stewart; RB | Olympia, Washington | Timberline HS | 5 ft 10 in (1.78 m) | 221 lb (100 kg) | 4.5 | Jan 21, 2005 |
| Jonathan Stewart; RB | Recruit ratings: Scout: Rivals: | | | | | |
| James Finley; WR | Compton, California | Compton CC | 6 ft 3 in (1.91 m) | 200 lb (91 kg) | 4.5 | Dec 14, 2004 |
| James Finley; WR | Recruit ratings: Scout: Rivals: | | | | | |
| Ed Dickson; TE | Bellflower, California | Bellflower HS | 6 ft 6 in (1.98 m) | 225 lb (102 kg) | 4.6 | Jan 25, 2005 |
| Ed Dickson; TE | Recruit ratings: Scout: Rivals: | | | | | |
| Derrick Jones; WR | Long Beach, California | Polytechnic HS | 6 ft 2 in (1.88 m) | 185 lb (84 kg) | 4.6 | Feb 2, 2005 |
| Derrick Jones; WR | Recruit ratings: Scout: Rivals: | | | | | |
| Palauni Ma Sun; OL | Fresno, California | Fresno CC | 6 ft 6 in (1.98 m) | 333 lb (151 kg) | NA | Jan 23, 2005 |
| Palauni Ma Sun; OL | Recruit ratings: Scout: Rivals: | | | | | |
| Jason Turner; LB | Culver City, California | West Los Angeles CC | 6 ft 2 in (1.88 m) | 230 lb (100 kg) | 4.6 | Jan 19, 2005 |
| Jason Turner; LB | Recruit ratings: Scout: Rivals: | | | | | |
| Nick Reed; DE | Mission Viejo, California | Mission Viejo HS | 6 ft 2 in (1.88 m) | 234 lb (106 kg) | 4.9 | Jul 9, 2004 |
| Nick Reed; DE | Recruit ratings: Scout: Rivals: | | | | | |
| Kevin Garrett; S | Harbor City, California | Nathaniel Narbonne HS | 6 ft 0 in (1.83 m) | 199 lb (90 kg) | 4.7 | Nov 30, 2004 |
| Kevin Garrett; S | Recruit ratings: Scout: Rivals: | | | | | |
| Jeremiah Johnson; RB | Los Angeles, California | Susan Miller Dorsey HS | 5 ft 10 in (1.78 m) | 188 lb (85 kg) | 4.6 | Dec 28, 2004 |
| Jeremiah Johnson; RB | Recruit ratings: Scout: Rivals: | | | | | |
| Brian Truelove; OL | Snellville, Georgia | Brookwood HS | 6 ft 2 in (1.88 m) | 278 lb (126 kg) | 5.1 | Jul 7, 2004 |
| Brian Truelove; OL | Recruit ratings: Scout: Rivals: | | | | | |
| Mat Webb; OL | Vancouver, Washington | Heritage HS | 6 ft 7 in (2.01 m) | 295 lb (134 kg) | 5.0 | Jul 2, 2004 |
| Mat Webb; OL | Recruit ratings: Scout: Rivals: | | | | | |
| Matt Bramow; S | Eugene, Oregon | South Eugene HS | 6 ft 4 in (1.93 m) | 191 lb (87 kg) | 4.9 | Nov 14, 2004 |
| Matt Bramow; S | Recruit ratings: Scout: Rivals: | | | | | |
| Titus Jackson; S | Pomona, California | Diamond Ranch HS | 6 ft 0 in (1.83 m) | 185 lb (84 kg) | 4.5 | Jan 5, 2004 |
| Titus Jackson; S | Recruit ratings: Scout: Rivals: | | | | | |
| Chris Mulvanny; LB | Pleasant Hill, California | Diablo Valley College | 6 ft 1 in (1.85 m) | 217 lb (98 kg) | 4.5 | Dec 17, 2004 |
| Chris Mulvanny; LB | Recruit ratings: Scout: Rivals: | | | | | |
| Blair Phillips; LB | Perkinston, Mississippi | Mississippi Gulf Coast CC | 6 ft 3 in (1.91 m) | 242 lb (110 kg) | 4.5 | Jan 9, 2005 |
| Blair Phillips; LB | Recruit ratings: Scout: Rivals: | | | | | |
| Pat So'oalo; OL | Fresno, California | Fresno CC | 6 ft 5 in (1.96 m) | 298 lb (135 kg) | NA | Jan 9, 2005 |
| Pat So'oalo; OL | Recruit ratings: Scout: Rivals: | | | | | |
| Walter Thurmond; CB | West Covina, California | West Covina HS | 5 ft 11 in (1.80 m) | 163 lb (74 kg) | 4.5 | Jan 9, 2005 |
| Walter Thurmond; CB | Recruit ratings: Scout: Rivals: | | | | | |
| Jairus Byrd; CB | Clayton, Missouri | Clayton HS | 6 ft 0 in (1.83 m) | 196 lb (89 kg) | 4.6 | Jan 24, 2005 |
| Jairus Byrd; CB | Recruit ratings: Scout: Rivals: | | | | | |
| Tucker Callahan; LB | Fairhope, Alabama | Fairhope HS | 6 ft 2 in (1.88 m) | 200 lb (91 kg) | 4.6 | Dec 1, 2004 |
| Tucker Callahan; LB | Recruit ratings: Scout: Rivals: | | | | | |
| Levi Horn; TE | Spokane, Washington | John R Rogers HS | 6 ft 7 in (2.01 m) | 260 lb (120 kg) | 5.1 | Jan 5, 2005 |
| Levi Horn; TE | Recruit ratings: Scout: Rivals: | | | | | |
| Simi Toeaina; DT | Pago Pago, AS | Samoana HS | 6 ft 3 in (1.91 m) | 285 lb (129 kg) | NA | Feb 2, 2005 |
| Simi Toeaina; DT | Recruit ratings: Scout: Rivals: | | | | | |
| Matt Dragich; K | Torrance, California | El Camino CC | 6 ft 1 in (1.85 m) | 210 lb (95 kg) | NA | Jan 30, 2005 |
| Matt Dragich; K | Recruit ratings: Scout: Rivals: | | | | | |
| Mark Sunga; LB | Sherman Oaks, California | Notre Dame HS | 6 ft 1 in (1.85 m) | 230 lb (100 kg) | 5.2 | Feb 2, 2005 |
| Mark Sunga; LB | Recruit ratings: Scout: Rivals: | | | | | |
Overall recruit ranking: Scout: 30 Rivals: 28
‡ Refers to 40-yard dash; Note: In many cases, Scout, Rivals, 247Sports, On3, and ESPN may conflict in their listings of height, weight and 40 time.; In these cases, the average was taken. ESPN grades are on a 100-point scale.; Sources: "Oregon Football Commitment List 2005". Rivals.; "Oregon College Football Recruiting Commits 2005". Scout.; "Scout.com Team Recruiting Rankings". Scout.; "2005 Team Ranking". Rivals.com.
