= 2005 Oregon State Beavers football team =

American college football season

2005 Oregon State Beavers football
- Conference: Pacific-10 Conference
- Record: 5–6 (3–5 Pac-10)
- Head coach: Mike Riley (5th season)
- Offensive coordinator: Danny Langsdorf (1st season)
- Offensive scheme: Multiple
- Defensive coordinator: Mark Banker (3rd season)
- Base defense: 4–3
- Home stadium: Reser Stadium

2005 Pacific-10 Conference football standings
	Conf.			Overall
Team	W		L	W		L
No. 2 USC † $	8	–	0	12	–	1
No. 13 Oregon	7	–	1	10	–	2
No. 16 UCLA	6	–	2	10	–	2
No. 25 California	4	–	4	8	–	4
Arizona State	4	–	4	7	–	5
Stanford	4	–	4	5	–	6
Oregon State	3	–	5	5	–	6
Arizona	2	–	6	3	–	8
Washington State	1	–	7	4	–	7
Washington	1	–	7	2	–	9
$ – Conference champion; † – USC later vacated 12 wins (8 in conference) and 1 loss due to NCAA sanctions.; Rankings from AP Poll

The 2005 Oregon State Beavers football team represented Oregon State University as a member of the Pacific-10 Conference (Pac-10) during the 2005 NCAA Division I-A football season. Led by fifth-year head coach Mike Riley, the Beavers compiled an overall record of 5–6 with a mark of 3–5 in conference play, placing seventh the Pac-10. The team played home games at Reser Stadium in Corvallis, Oregon.

== Schedule ==
Date	Time	Opponent	Site	TV	Result	Attendance	Source
September 3	3:00 pm	Portland State*	Reser Stadium; Corvallis, OR	FSNNW	W 41–14	42,263	
September 10	3:30 pm	Boise State*	Reser Stadium; Corvallis, OR	FSN	W 30–27	42,876	
September 17	3:00 pm	at No. 11 Louisville*	Papa John's Cardinal Stadium; Louisville, KY	ESPN	L 27–63	42,647	
September 24	7:00 pm	Arizona State	Reser Stadium; Corvallis, OR	TBS	L 24–42	41,374	
October 1	4:00 pm	Washington State	Reser Stadium; Corvallis, OR	TBS	W 44–33	42,908	
October 15	12:30 pm	at No. 18 California	Memorial Stadium, Berkeley; Berkeley, CA	ABC	W 23–20	57,174	
October 22	4:00 pm	at No. 8 UCLA	Rose Bowl; Pasadena, CA	FSN	L 28–51	49,932	
October 29	1:05 pm	Arizona	Reser Stadium; Corvallis, OR		L 29–27	40,759	
November 5	3:30 pm	at Washington	Husky Stadium; Seattle, WA		W 18–10	60,717	
November 12	3:30 pm	Stanford	Reser Stadium; Corvallis, OR	FSNNW	L 17–20	42,960	
November 19	3:45 pm	at No. 10 Oregon	Autzen Stadium; Eugene, OR (Civil War)	FSN	L 14–56	58,525	
*Non-conference game; Rankings from AP Poll released prior to the game; All times are in Pacific time

== Game summaries ==
=== Portland State ===
	1	2	3	4	Total
Portland State	0	7	7	0	14
Oregon State	10	10	14	7	41

=== Boise State ===
	1	2	3	4	Total
Boise State	14	3	10	0	27
Oregon State	7	7	6	10	30

=== Louisville ===
	1	2	3	4	Total
Oregon State	10	0	3	14	27
Louisville	7	28	21	7	63

=== Arizona State ===
	1	2	3	4	Total
Arizona State	7	7	28	0	42
Oregon State	0	3	7	14	24

=== Washington State ===
	1	2	3	4	Total
Washington State	7	23	0	3	33
Oregon State	10	6	7	21	44

=== California ===
	1	2	3	4	Total
Oregon State	6	3	7	7	23
California	0	14	6	0	20

=== UCLA ===
	1	2	3	4	Total
Oregon State	7	7	7	7	28
No. 8 UCLA	10	21	10	10	51

=== Arizona ===
	1	2	3	4	Total
Arizona	13	10	6	0	29
Oregon State	3	7	7	10	27

=== Washington ===
	1	2	3	4	Total
Oregon State	3	3	6	6	18
Washington	0	0	0	10	10

=== Stanford ===
	1	2	3	4	Total
Stanford	10	7	3	0	20
Oregon State	7	7	3	0	17

=== Oregon ===
	1	2	3	4	Total
Oregon State	0	7	7	0	14
Oregon	14	14	14	14	56

== Roster ==
2005 Oregon State Beavers football team roster
Players
Coaches
Offense

Pos.	#	Name	Class
QB	8	Matt Moore	Jr
QB	10	Ryan Gunderson	So
WR	28	Mike Hass	Sr

Defense

Pos.	#	Name	Class

Special teams

Pos.	#	Name	Class

Head coach

- Mike Riley

Coordinators/assistant coaches

Legend

- (C) Team captain
- (S) Suspended
- (I) Ineligible
- Injured
- Redshirt
