= 2005 Arizona Wildcats football team =

American college football season

2005 Arizona Wildcats football
- Conference: Pacific-10
- Record: 3–8 (2–6 Pac-10)
- Head coach: Mike Stoops (2nd season)
- Offensive coordinator: Mike Canales (2nd season)
- Offensive scheme: Pro-style
- Defensive coordinator: Mark Stoops (2nd season)
- Base defense: 4–3
- Home stadium: Arizona Stadium

2005 Pacific-10 Conference football standings
	Conf.			Overall
Team	W		L	W		L
No. 2 USC † $	8	–	0	12	–	1
No. 13 Oregon	7	–	1	10	–	2
No. 16 UCLA	6	–	2	10	–	2
No. 25 California	4	–	4	8	–	4
Arizona State	4	–	4	7	–	5
Stanford	4	–	4	5	–	6
Oregon State	3	–	5	5	–	6
Arizona	2	–	6	3	–	8
Washington State	1	–	7	4	–	7
Washington	1	–	7	2	–	9
$ – Conference champion; † – USC later vacated 12 wins (8 in conference) and 1 loss due to NCAA sanctions.; Rankings from AP Poll

The 2005 Arizona Wildcats football team represented the University of Arizona during the 2005 NCAA Division I-A football season. They were coached by Mike Stoops in his second season with the Wildcats. They ended the year with a 3–8 record (2–6 against Pac-10 opponents), which was identical to the previous season in terms of the record.

Despite a below-average record, the season featured a blowout upset victory over UCLA in November that was a high point for the Wildcats during the year.

== Before the season ==
During the offseason, Stoops and his coaching staff went on recruiting trips to get players that would help the Wildcats improve from their 2004 season. By the start of the preseason, the team introduced red jerseys that were to be worn during select home games. It would become the first time since 1980 that Arizona will red at home (they traditionally wore blue jerseys for home games). Stoops believed that wearing red would help the team have a success at winning, though Stoops wanted the Wildcats to distinguish themselves from a few other Pac-10 schools (including USC, Stanford, Washington State, and Arizona State) whose colors are a variation of red, though Arizona and California have blue as one of their colors, Arizona's blue is slightly lighter than Cal's. The addition of red jerseys, along with the blue helmets that were introduced prior to the start of the previous season, would lead to excitement from fans who believed that the Wildcats would be prepared to compete and have an impact on future success (the fans have often worn red during Arizona's home games since Stoops became coach as it was considered a good luck charm for the team and that wearing blue would be bad luck).

== Schedule ==
Date	Time	Opponent	Site	TV	Result	Attendance
September 2	5:00 p.m.	at Utah*	Rice-Eccles Stadium; Salt Lake City, UT	ESPN	L 24–27	45,528
September 10	7:00 p.m.	Northern Arizona*	Arizona Stadium; Tucson, AZ	FSNAZ	W 31–12	55,728
September 17	7:00 p.m.	No. 12 Purdue*	Arizona Stadium; Tucson, AZ	ESPN Plus	L 24–31	56,400
October 1	4:00 p.m.	at No. 12 California	California Memorial Stadium; Berkeley, CA	TBS	L 0–28	55,944
October 8	12:30 p.m.	at No. 1 USC	Los Angeles Memorial Coliseum; Los Angeles, CA	FSN	L 21–42	90,221
October 15	4:00 p.m.	Stanford	Arizona Stadium; Tucson, AZ	FSNAZ	L 16–20	54,216
October 22	4:30 p.m.	No. 15 Oregon	Arizona Stadium; Tucson, AZ	FSNAZ	L 21–28	48,052
October 29	1:00 p.m.	at Oregon State	Reser Stadium; Corvallis, OR	FSN	W 29–27	40,759
November 5	4:00 p.m.	No. 7 UCLA^{†}	Arizona Stadium; Tucson, AZ	FSN	W 52–14	55,775
November 12	4:00 p.m.	Washington	Arizona Stadium; Tucson, AZ	FSN	L 14–38	52,505
November 25	1:00 p.m.	at Arizona State	Sun Devil Stadium; Tempe, AZ (Territorial Cup)	FSN	L 20–23	67,635
*Non-conference game; ^{†}Homecoming; Rankings from AP Poll released prior to the game; All times are in Mountain time

== Game summaries ==
=== Utah ===
	1	2	3	4	Total
Arizona	0	3	14	7	24
Utah	0	10	17	0	27

In the season opener, the Wildcats traveled to Salt Lake City for a Friday night matchup with Utah, who had gotten a new head coach. After a scoreless first quarter, the Utes would take control and led 27–10 in the second half before Arizona rallied to get within 27–24 in the fourth quarter. Unfortunately, the Wildcats would come up short and started the season at 0–1. This was the final non-conference game between Arizona and Utah before they would meet again in 2011, as the Utes (along with Colorado) would join the Pac-10, which would be renamed the Pac-12.

=== Northern Arizona ===
	1	2	3	4	Total
Northern Arizona	0	3	9	0	12
Arizona	10	14	0	7	31

For the second consecutive year and the third time in four seasons, Arizona hosted NAU in their home opener (Stoops got his first victory by beating NAU in the 2004 opener). The Wildcats would dominate in the first half with a 24–3 lead at the half. The Lumberjacks got into a rhythm in the second half and would shrink the Arizona lead in half at 24–12. However, in the fourth quarter, a Wildcat touchdown would break the game open and Arizona earned their first win of the year to even their record at 1–1.

=== Purdue ===
	1	2	3	4	Total
Purdue	14	7	10	0	31
Arizona	7	10	0	7	24

In their first big test, the Wildcats played Purdue, who was ranked 12th and it was rematch of the 2003 matchup between the two that saw Purdue embarrass Arizona. The Wildcats wore their red jerseys for the first time since 1980, and sent Arizona Stadium in a frenzy as a result. However, all of that went for naught, as the Boilermakers would capitalize on several Arizona mistakes which led to the Wildcats losing despite them keeping the game close for most of the early part. With the loss, Arizona fell to 1–2 on the season.

=== California ===
	1	2	3	4	Total
Arizona	0	0	0	0	0
California	7	7	7	7	28

In their Pac-10 opener, Arizona traveled to Berkeley to face California who had shut out the Wildcats in the previous year. The Golden Bears would dominate all game long and held Arizona scoreless yet again. It was the second straight season that Cal handed Arizona a shutout.

=== USC ===
	1	2	3	4	Total
Arizona	7	0	14	0	21
USC	7	7	14	14	42

The Wildcats remained on the road for the second week in a row, as they traveled to USC to take on the top-ranked Trojans. As USC was the reigning national champion (though its BCS title was later vacated by the NCAA in 2010 due to violations) and being on a 26-game winning streak that dated back to 2003, Stoops made headlines days before the game by remarking that the Trojans were “too hard to beat” and “played like an NFL team” due to their dominant and powerful NFL-style offense that was incredibly difficult to slow down and that the Wildcats would not have a chance to compete with as a result. At the start of the game, Stoops was met with chants of “Who's hard to beat?” and “Who plays like an NFL team?” by USC fans, as they heard of Stoops’ comments as it hit the media sources.

In the game, Arizona would hang tough with the Trojans, as they only trailed 28-21 after the first three quarters. However, in the fourth, Stoops’ remarks proved to be true as USC would show why they were the top-ranked team by pulling away with a pair of touchdowns to earn the victory and extend their win streak to 27 games. It was the third straight season that USC scored 40 points or more against Arizona, making Stoops’ remarks true as the Trojans’ pro-style offense was in fact dominant against the Wildcats.

=== Stanford ===
	1	2	3	4	Total
Stanford	0	10	10	0	20
Arizona	7	0	7	2	16

Arizona returned home to play Stanford in the first meeting between the two teams since 2002 and the first at home for the Wildcats since 2001. The Wildcats were looking to earn their first Pac-10 win of the year and would strike first in the opening quarter before the Cardinal came back to take the lead before halftime. Stanford would add to their lead in the second half, though Arizona kept the game close for most of the way, but would fall short to lose yet again. The Wildcats committed five turnovers, which was a major factor in the loss.

=== Oregon ===
	1	2	3	4	Total
Oregon	21	0	0	7	28
Arizona	0	14	7	0	21

The Wildcats hosted 15th-ranked Oregon in their next game and looked for their first conference victory with an upset. The Ducks would put Arizona into a hole early by scoring 21 points in the opening quarter which included Oregon returning a punt into a score. In the second quarter, the Wildcats, with a change at quarterback, got back into the game with two touchdowns of their own to cut the deficit to seven by halftime. Arizona would score in the third quarter to tie it at 21, which completed a comeback from their large first-quarter deficit. However, in the fourth, Arizona, in an attempt to take the lead, would lose a fumble that led to Oregon returning it for a touchdown for a 28–21 lead. The Wildcats tried to respond late, but would make mistakes on offense and lost once again. It was their fifth straight defeat since defeating NAU in early September.

In addition to Arizona changing quarterbacks during the game, Oregon would lose their starting quarterback to a season-ending injury. Despite Arizona's backup performing better, it wasn't enough to lead the Wildcats to an upset win, mainly due to several offensive miscues during the game. Stoops said after the game that he needed a change at quarterback in an attempt to turn the offense's performance around, as they struggled to score points entering the game against the Ducks.

=== Oregon State ===
	1	2	3	4	Total
Arizona	13	10	6	0	29
Oregon State	3	7	7	10	27

As they still continued to look for their first Pac-10 win, Arizona traveled on the road to Oregon State. The Wildcats, under a new quarterback, would dominate the Beavers in the first half and led 23–10 at halftime. In the second half, Oregon State regrouped and rallied to get within 29-27 late in the fourth quarter and threatened at the lead by driving into Wildcat territory. However, Arizona's defense forced a turnover and the Wildcats finally earned their first conference victory. It was Arizona's first win over the Beavers since 1998 and their first in October since 2000. Also, it was the first time since 2000 that the Wildcats defeated a Pac-10 team other than Arizona State, California, or Washington.

Arizona's defense forced seven turnovers by Oregon State, including a late fumble as well as interception on the game's final play, which became a difference in the Wildcat victory.

=== UCLA ===
	1	2	3	4	Total
UCLA	0	7	0	7	14
Arizona	21	10	21	0	52

After defeating Oregon State on the road, the Wildcats went back home and hosted unbeaten and 7th-ranked UCLA on homecoming day. Arizona would surprise the Bruins with a 21–0 lead after the opening quarter by using an energetic offense and increased their lead to 28–0 in the second before UCLA got on the board. The Wildcats would get a field goal late to take a 31–7 lead at the half with Arizona Stadium in a frenzy.

In the second half, Arizona continued their domination with 21 more points, which included a punt return touchdown and then a defensive score caused by UCLA fumbling on a backwards lateral pass that was recovered by the Wildcats in the end zone, for a 52–7 lead and breaking the game wide open. In the fourth quarter, the Bruins added a touchdown during garbage time to make it 52–14, but the deficit was too large to overcome and the Wildcats got the upset win as fans rushed the field as time expired. It was Arizona's third win of the year, which matched the previous season total.

The Wildcats dominated on both sides of ball in their first win over an unbeaten opponent in a homecoming game since their infamous win over Washington in 1992. It was also Arizona's first victory over UCLA since 1999 and their first at home since 1996. In addition, it was the first time under Stoops that the Wildcats won consecutive games (prior to this, the last time that Arizona had won at least two straight games occurred early in the 2002 season).

=== Washington ===
	1	2	3	4	Total
Washington	7	7	14	10	38
Arizona	7	7	0	0	14

Coming off of their blowout victory over UCLA, Arizona hosted Washington in their home finale and looked to earn their third straight win. Both teams would hang tough in the first half, as the Wildcats led 14-7 late in the second quarter. However, the Huskies converted a successful Hail Mary pass for a touchdown on the final play before halftime to tie it at 14. The play would swing momentum toward Washington, as they would take control of the second half and shut out Arizona 24–0 to pull away for the win and led to their first Pac-10 victory since 2003 (Washington had lost 14 consecutive conference games before then).

The Wildcats committed five turnovers, including four in the second half, which led to Husky points and becoming the main reason for the loss.

=== Arizona State ===
	1	2	3	4	Total
Arizona	3	14	3	0	20
Arizona State	5	0	7	11	23

The Wildcats concluded the season with the annual rivalry game against Arizona State. It was Stoops’ first trip to Tempe as Arizona sought a second straight win over the Sun Devils after winning the previous season. After both teams traded field goals to start the game, a botched punt attempt by Arizona led to an ASU safety, which gave them the lead. In the second quarter, the Wildcats would score a pair of touchdowns to lead 17–5 at halftime. In the third quarter, Arizona added a field goal to make it 20-5 before the Devils scored to get within eight at 20–12.

In the fourth quarter, the Wildcats suffered injuries to their quarterback and running back, which would affect their offense and had to bring in their backup quarterback, who beat ASU a year ago. With under eight minutes to play, the game made its turning point as Arizona State returned a punt for a touchdown and scored a two-point conversion to tie at 20, which caused Sun Devil Stadium to erupt in delirium. The sequence of events by ASU changed the momentum of the game, which Arizona controlled for most of it, as they would force a punt by the Wildcats and gave the Devils the ball back for a chance at the lead with the game on the line. ASU would drive down the field in the final minutes and got into Wildcat territory and field goal range. In the closing seconds, ASU kicked the ball through the goal posts for a 23–20 lead. After an unsuccessful kickoff return by Arizona, the Devils completed the comeback for the win and brought the Territorial Cup (the rivalry trophy) back to Phoenix/Tempe and became bowl-eligible, and the Wildcats’ season ended at a 3–8 record for the second consecutive year.

== Awards and honors ==
- Mike Thomas, WR, Pac-10 offensive freshman of the year
- Darrell Brooks, FS, First-team All-Pac-10
- Antoine Cason, CB, Second-team All-Pac-10
- Copeland Bryan, DE, Second-team All-Pac-10
- Danny Baugher, P, Second-team All-Pac-10

== Season notes ==
- Arizona finished with the same record as they did in the previous season at 3–8. This was the first time since 2000-01 that the Wildcats ended consecutive seasons with identical records (they went 5–6 in both 2000 and 2001).
- Despite expectations that the Wildcats would improve from their 2004 season, injuries and a below-average offense as well as a tough schedule against difficult opponents hurt Arizona's chances, leading to the 3–8 season.
- Under a new quarterback in charge for most of the second half of the season, the Arizona offense slightly improved and earned a huge win over UCLA, while the defense continued its improvement. Were it not for mistakes and a few injuries, the Wildcats would have ended the regular season on a winning streak and possibly have been bowl-eligible.
- Wide receiver Mike Thomas would become the top receiver for Arizona's offense for the rest of his Wildcat career and would later break both the Arizona and Pac-10 record for most catches by a single receiver in 2008, though he would ultimately be surpassed in the Pac-10/12 category.
- The season was very similar to 2004, as Arizona defeated NAU in their home opener for their first win and had to wait until the second half of the season to earn an elusive second win, though the win over Oregon State in late October meant that they did not wait until November to pick up their first Pac-10 victory for the first time since 2000.
- Arizona would not play Utah in Salt Lake City again until 2012.
- This would begin a pattern where the Wildcats play NAU in odd-numbered years (2005, 2007, 2009, etc.)
- This remains the only time to where Arizona played Purdue in Tucson.
- Arizona was shut out by California on the road for the second straight year.
- The punt return touchdown against UCLA was the Wildcats’ first since 2000.
- The Wildcats split the two games between the two Los Angeles teams that were ranked in the top ten when Arizona played them (losing on the road at USC and winning at home against UCLA). Many Wildcat fans have often believed that the win over the UCLA avenged Arizona's loss to UCLA in 1998 (that was also played in Tucson), which saw a top-ten Bruin squad prevent the Wildcats from earning both the outright Pac-10 title and Rose Bowl berth in the head-to head matchup that year, although Arizona was unranked in 2005 when they defeated UCLA.
- As Arizona beat a struggling Washington team on the road in 2004, the 2005 meeting was an opposite effect, as the Huskies, who were again struggling when they entered the game against the Wildcats, would defeat Arizona on the road, although the Wildcats had a losing record as well.
- With the Wildcats giving up a 20-5 second-half lead against Arizona State in the finale and losing it, it marked the first time since 1975 that Arizona lost to ASU after leading by at least 10 points at one point (in the 1975 meeting, the Wildcats led 14-3 early against ASU before the Sun Devils rallied to win 24–21). Arizona would suffer the same feat in 2012, 2017, and 2018.
- Arizona ended the year with a 2–6 conference record for the second consecutive season (they also finished with an identical record of 1–7 in Pac-10 games in 2002-03 prior to the Stoops era).
- The season continued a rebuild under Stoops, in which Arizona was attempting to recover from the post-Mackovic era. As the Wildcats finished with another 3–8 record, it led to speculation that Stoops would be placed on the hot seat in 2006, though Stoops became confident that the team would continue to improve as they entered the year.
