= 2005 Sun Bowl =

American college football game

2005 Vitalis Sun Bowl
Northwestern Wildcats	UCLA Bruins
(7–4)	(9–2)
Big Ten	Pac-10
38	50
Head coach: Randy Walker	Head coach: Karl Dorrell
AP / Coaches / BCS; NR / NR / 25	AP / Coaches / BCS; 17 / 17 / 16
	1	2	3	4	Total
Northwestern	22	0	3	13	38
UCLA	7	22	7	14	50
- Date: December 30, 2005
- Season: 2005
- Stadium: Sun Bowl
- Location: El Paso, Texas
- MVP: Chris Markey (UCLA RB) and Kahlil Bell (UCLA RB)
- National anthem: Northwestern Wildcat Marching Band
- Referee: Dan Romeo (WAC)
- Halftime show: Northwestern Wildcat Marching Band & Diamond Rio
- Attendance: 50,426
- Payout: US$1.575 million per team

United States TV coverage
- Network: CBS
- Announcers: Verne Lundquist, Todd Blackledge, Tracy Wolfson

The 2005 Sun Bowl was a college football bowl game played on December 30, 2005, in El Paso, Texas. Sponsored by the Vitalis brand of hair tonic made by Bristol-Myers, the game was officially known as the Vitalis Sun Bowl. It was the 72nd Sun Bowl. It featured the UCLA Bruins, and the Northwestern Wildcats. UCLA overcame a 22–0 deficit to Northwestern in the first quarter to win 50–38. UCLA running backs Chris Markey and Kahlil Bell shared the most valuable player award, the first such shared award in Sun Bowl history. Defensive tackle Kevin Mims of Northwestern won the Jimmy Rogers, Jr. Most Valuable Lineman award. This was the biggest comeback in UCLA football history, until the 2017 UCLA vs. Texas A & M game, in which the Bruins scored 34 points. It still stands as of 2021 as the largest comeback in Sun Bowl History. It also is the highest scoring Sun Bowl game.

The game would unexpectedly be Randy Walker's last as Northwestern head coach. Walker died of an apparent heart attack the following June.

== Game summary ==
The weather was clear and 56 degrees Fahrenheit.

Northwestern's Joel Howells started the scoring with a 33-yard field goal to give Northwestern an early 3–0 lead. Kevin Mims later scored on a 33-yard interception return to increase Northwestern's lead to 9–0. Mark Philmore rushed 19 yards for a touchdown to put Northwestern up 15–0. However, the kicker missed his second consecutive extra point attempt.

Nick Roach intercepted another UCLA pass and returned it 35 yards for a touchdown to give Northwestern a 22-0 first quarter lead. At the end of the quarter, running back Kahlil Bell put UCLA on the board, by rushing for a 5-yard touchdown run to cut the lead to 22–7. Less than 2 minutes later, quarterback Drew Olson connected with wide receiver Ryan Moya for a 58-yard touchdown pass, to cut the lead to 22–14.

Kahlil Bell scored his second rushing touchdown of the game by rushing 6 yards for a touchdown. Drew Olson then found tight end Marcedes Lewis for the two-point conversion to tie the game at 22. With 29 seconds left in the first half, Olson found wide receiver Marcus Everett for an 8-yard touchdown pass to give UCLA a 29-22 halftime lead.

In the third quarter, Olson connected with Michael Pitre for a 5-yard touchdown pass, to extend the lead to 36–22. Amado Villarreal connected on a 31-yard field goal for Northwestern, to cut the lead to 36–25.

The last 2:30 of the game featured a lot of scoring. Quarterback Brett Basanez found Mark Philmore for an 8-yard touchdown pass to cut the lead to 36–31 with 2:29 remaining. The ensuing onside kick was recovered by Brandon Breazell and returned 42 yards for a touchdown, extending UCLA's lead to 43–31. With 24 seconds in the game, Basanez found wide receiver Shaun Herbert for a 5-yard touchdown pass, pulling NU to 43–38. The ensuing onside kick was recovered by Breazell, and once again returned 45 yards for a touchdown. That made the final margin 50–38.

== Scoring ==
2005 Vitalis Sun Bowl

Quarter	1	2	3	4	Total
Wildcats	22	0	3	13	38
No. 17 Bruins	7	22	7	14	50

at Sun Bowl, El Paso, Texas

- Date: December 30
- Game time: 12:00 p.m. MST
- Game weather: Clear, 56 °F (13 °C)
- Game attendance: 50,426
- Referee: Dan Romeo
- TV announcers (CBS): Verne Lundquist, Todd Blackledge, and Tracy Wolfson
- Northwestern box score

Game information
First quarter
- NU – Joel Howells 33-yard field goal, 7:53. Wildcats 3–0. Drive: 14 plays, 61 yards, 5:38.
- NU – Kevin Mims 30-yard interception return (kick blocked), 6:27. Wildcats 9–0.
- NU – Mark Philmore 19-yard run (kick failed), 5:36. Wildcats 15–0. Drive: 4 plays, 36 yards, 0:39.
- NU – Nick Roach 35-yard interception return (Joel Howells kick), 4:21. Wildcats 22–0.
- UCLA – Kahlil Bell 5-yard run (Jimmy Rotstein kick), 0:15. Wildcats 22–7. Drive: 11 plays, 80 yards, 4:06.

Second quarter

- UCLA – Ryan Moya 58-yard pass from Drew Olson (Jimmy Rotstein kick), 13:57. Wildcats 22–14. Drive: 1 play, 58 yards, 0:09.
- UCLA – Kahlil Bell 6-yard run (Drew Olson pass to Marcedes Lewis), 8:26. Tied 22–22. Drive: 5 plays, 90 yards, 2:23.
- UCLA – Marcus Everett 8-yard pass from Drew Olson (Jimmy Rotstein kick), 0:29. Bruins 29–22. Drive: 10 plays, 79 yards, 2:27.

Third quarter

- UCLA – Michael Pitre 5-yard pass from Drew Olson (Jimmy Rotstein kick), 9:04. Bruins 36–22. Drive: 5 plays, 16 yards, 2:03.
- NU – Amado Villarreal 31-yard field goal, 4:40. Bruins 36–25. Drive: 12 plays, 72 yards, 4:24.

Fourth quarter

- NU – Mark Philmore 8-yard pass from Brett Basanez (pass intercepted), 2:29. Bruins 36–31. Drive: 8 plays, 84 yards, 1:11.
- UCLA – Brand Breazell 42-yard kickoff return (Brian Malette kick), 2:24. Bruins 43–31.
- NU – Shaun Herbert 5-yard pass from Brett Basanez (Amado Villarreal kick), 0:24. Bruins 43–38. Drive: 16 plays, 83 yards, 2:00.
- UCLA – Brand Breazell 45-yard kickoff return (Brian Malette kick), 0:18. Bruins 50–38.

== Statistics ==
Team statistical comparison
Statistic	NU	UCLA
First downs	33	24
First downs rushing	11	18
First downs passing	17	4
First downs penalty	5	2
Third down efficiency	5–20	6–13
Fourth down efficiency	4–5	1–2
Total plays–net yards	102–584	74–453
Rushing attempts–net yards	32–168	50–310
Yards per rush	5.3	6.2
Yards passing	416	143
Pass completions–attempts	38–70	10–24
Interceptions thrown	2	3
Punt returns–total yards	5–12	1–20
Kickoff returns–total yards	6–74	6–156
Punts–average yardage	5–31.0	5–40.4
Fumbles–lost	4–1	2–1
Penalties–yards	6–49	8–69
Time of possession	30:50	29:10

Northwestern statistics
Wildcats passing
	C–A	Yds	TD–INT
Brett Basanez	38–70	416	2–2
Wildcats rushing
	Car	Yds	TD
Tyrell Sutton	18	84	0
Brett Basanez	8	32	0
Brandon Roberson	3	29	0
Mark Philmore	1	19	0
Jonathan Fields	2	0	0
Wildcats receiving
	Rec	Yds	TD
Ross Lane	7	136	0
Tyrell Sutton	7	67	0
Jonathan Fields	6	64	0
Shaun Herbert	7	61	1
Mark Philmore	7	45	1
Eric Peterman	2	27	0
Tonjua Jones	1	16	0
Sam Cheatham	1	0	0

UCLA statistics
Bruins passing
	C–A	Yds	TD–INT
Drew Olson	10–24	143	3–3
Bruins rushing
	Car	Yds	TD
Chris Markey	24	161	0
Kahlil Bell	19	136	2
Maurice Jones-Drew	3	14	0
Drew Olson	3	10	0
Matt Willis	1	-11	0
Bruins receiving
	Rec	Yds	TD
Ryan Moya	1	58	1
Maurice Jones-Drew	2	29	0
Brand Breazell	2	17	0
Marcus Everett	2	14	1
Joe Cowan	1	11	0
Chris Markey	1	9	0
Michael Pitre	1	5	1

== Aftermath ==
The 2005 Sun Bowl game, sponsored by Vitalis, had a $1.5 million payout.

=== UCLA Bruin team comeback records ===
This was the third record setting comeback for the 2005 UCLA Bruin football team. Until the 2017 season, they ranked first, second, and third in all-time scoring comebacks to win for the UCLA Bruins.

1. Down 22 points in the first quarter vs. Northwestern (2005 Sun Bowl) 0-22 / Final Score: 50-38
2. Down 21 points in the fourth quarter at Stanford (2005) 3-24 / Final Score: 30-27ot
3. Down 21 points in the second quarter at Washington State (2005) 7-28 / Final Score: 44-41ot

=== Sun Bowl records ===
The Northwestern Wildcats broke five records.

- Most Passing Completions: 38
- Most First Downs, Team: 33
- Most Penalties, Team: 5
- First Quarter Points, Team: 22
- Total offensive yardage: 584 total yards.

The UCLA Bruins broke three records.

- Kickoff Returns for Touchdowns: 2
- Most Points Game, Team: 50
- Biggest Comeback: down 22 Northwestern (22) vs. UCLA (0)

Together Northwestern and UCLA broke or tied six records.

- Most Penalties, Combined 7 Northwestern (5) and UCLA (2) (tied with Purdue and Washington in the 2001 Sun Bowl)
- Most First Downs, Combined 57 Northwestern (33) and UCLA (24)
- Most First Quarter Points, Combined: 29 Northwestern (22) and UCLA (7)
- First Half Points, Combined: 51 UCLA (29) and Northwestern (22)
- Most Points Game, Combined: 88 UCLA (50) and Northwestern (38)
- Total offensive yardage: 1,037 yards.

In addition, Brett Basanez tied the individual record of 38 completions and broke the offensive yardage record at 448 yards.

=== Sun Bowl Legends ===
CBS Announcer Verne Lundquist who had been the Sun Bowl broadcaster starting in 1988, and former UCLA Bruins coach Terry Donahue were named Legends of the Sun Bowl.
