= 2005 Stanford Cardinal football team =

American college football season

2005 Stanford Cardinal football
- Conference: Pacific-10 Conference
- Record: 5–6 (4–4 Pac-10)
- Head coach: Walt Harris (1st season)
- Offensive scheme: West Coast
- Defensive coordinator: Tom Hayes (1st season)
- Base defense: 4–3
- Home stadium: Stanford Stadium

2005 Pacific-10 Conference football standings
| | Conf. | | | Overall |
| Team | W | | L | W | | L |
|---|---|---|---|---|---|---|
| No. 2 USC † $ | 8 | – | 0 | 12 | – | 1 |
| No. 13 Oregon | 7 | – | 1 | 10 | – | 2 |
| No. 16 UCLA | 6 | – | 2 | 10 | – | 2 |
| No. 25 California | 4 | – | 4 | 8 | – | 4 |
| Arizona State | 4 | – | 4 | 7 | – | 5 |
| Stanford | 4 | – | 4 | 5 | – | 6 |
| Oregon State | 3 | – | 5 | 5 | – | 6 |
| Arizona | 2 | – | 6 | 3 | – | 8 |
| Washington State | 1 | – | 7 | 4 | – | 7 |
| Washington | 1 | – | 7 | 2 | – | 9 |
$ – Conference champion; † – USC later vacated 12 wins (8 in conference) and 1 loss due to NCAA sanctions.; Rankings from AP Poll

The 2005 Stanford Cardinal football team represented Stanford University in the 2005 NCAA Division I FBS football season. The team was led by first-year head coach Walt Harris, replacing fired coach Buddy Teevens. The team played their home games at Stanford Stadium in Stanford, California and competed in the Pacific-10 Conference.

== Schedule ==
| Date | Time | Opponent | Site | TV | Result | Attendance |
|---|---|---|---|---|---|---|
| September 10 | 3:00 p.m. | at Navy* | Navy–Marine Corps Memorial Stadium; Annapolis, MD | CSTV | W 41–38 | 35,670 |
| September 17 | 7:00 p.m. | UC Davis* | Stanford Stadium; Stanford, CA | | L 17–20 | 31,250 |
| October 1 | 2:00 p.m. | Oregon | Stanford Stadium; Stanford, CA (rivalry) | | L 20–44 | 27,690 |
| October 8 | 4:00 p.m. | at Washington State | Martin Stadium; Pullman, WA | | W 24–21 | 33,422 |
| October 15 | 4:00 p.m. | at Arizona | Arizona Stadium; Tucson, AZ | | W 20–16 | 54,216 |
| October 22 | 2:00 p.m. | Arizona State | Stanford Stadium; Stanford, CA | | W 45–35 | 31,711 |
| October 29 | 3:30 p.m. | No. 8 UCLA | Stanford Stadium; Stanford, CA (rivalry) | FSN | L 27–30 ^{OT} | 42,850 |
| November 5 | 7:00 p.m. | at No. 1 USC | Los Angeles Memorial Coliseum; Los Angeles, CA (rivalry) | TBS | L 21–51 | 90,212 |
| November 12 | 3:30 p.m. | at Oregon State | Reser Stadium; Corvallis, OR | FSN | W 20–17 | 42,960 |
| November 19 | 4:00 p.m. | California | Stanford Stadium; Stanford, CA (108th Big Game) | ABC | L 3–27 | 71,743 |
| November 26 | 5:00 p.m. | No. 6 Notre Dame* | Stanford Stadium; Stanford, CA (Legends Trophy) | ABC | L 31–38 | 56,057 |
*Non-conference game; Rankings from Coaches' Poll released prior to the game; All times are in Pacific time

== Coaching staff ==
- Walt Harris – Head coach and offensive coordinator
- Wayne Moses – Running back
- Tucker Waugh – Wide receivers
- Tom Freeman – Offensive line (center and guards) and run game coordinator
- John McDonell – Offensive (tackle) and tight end
- Tom Hayes – Defensive coordinator and defensive backs
- Dave Tipton – Defensive line
- Darrell Patterson – Inside linebackers
- Tom Quinn – Outside linebackers and special teams coordinator
- Nathaniel Hackett – Specialist and recruiting coordinator
