= 2005 Las Vegas Bowl =

2005 Pioneer PureVision Las Vegas Bowl
- 14th Las Vegas Bowl
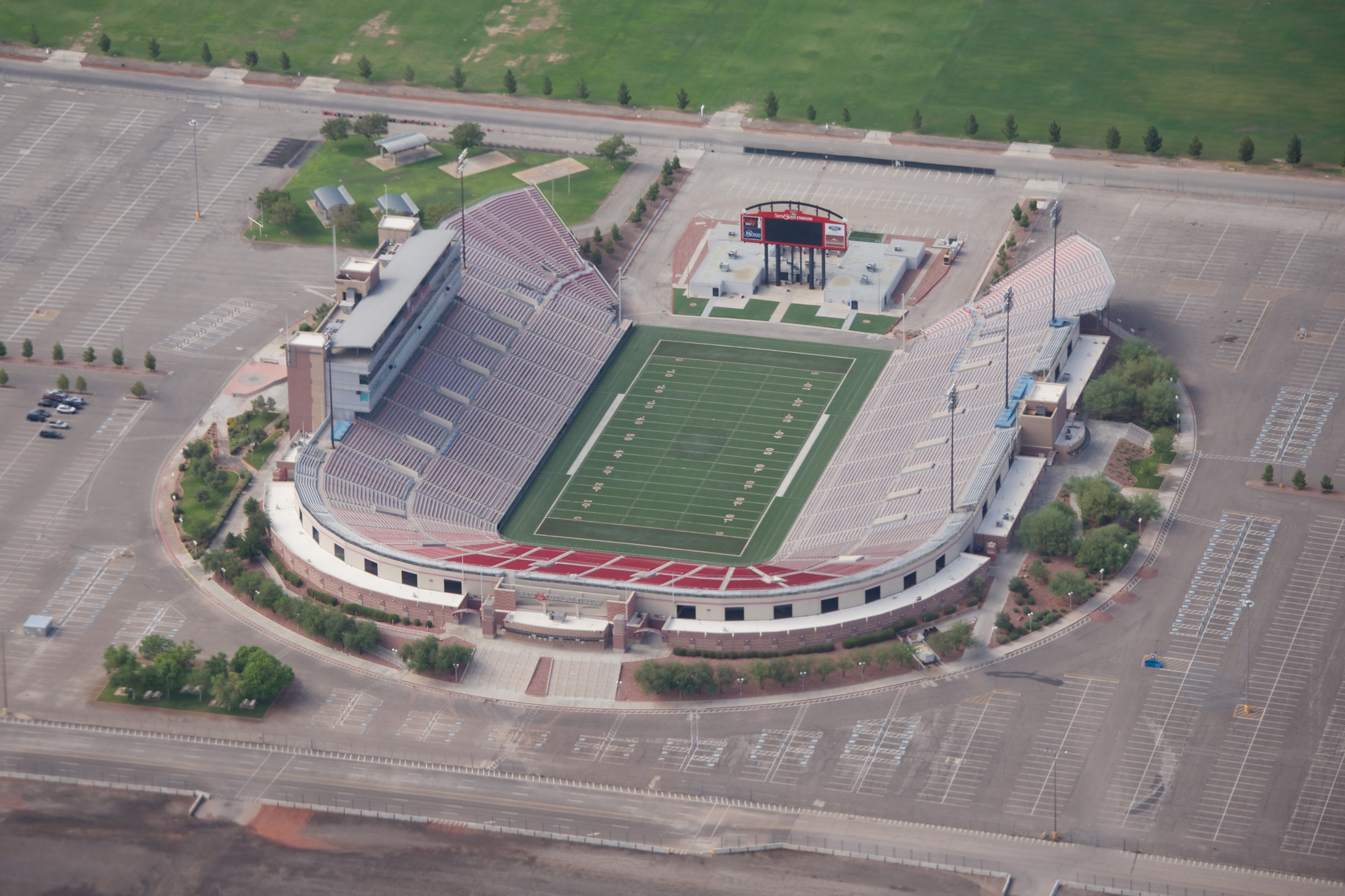
- Sam Boyd Stadium in Whitney, Nevada, hosted the Las Vegas Bowl.
BYU Cougars	California Golden Bears
(6–5)	(7–4)
Mountain West	Pac-10
28	35
Head coach: Bronco Mendenhall	Head coach: Jeff Tedford
	1	2	3	4	Total
BYU	0	14	0	14	28
California	7	14	14	0	35
- Date: December 22, 2005
- Season: 2005
- Stadium: Sam Boyd Stadium
- Location: Whitney, Nevada
- MVP: Marshawn Lynch, (RB, Cal)
- Referee: Gil Gelbke (C-USA)
- Payout: US$750,000 per team

United States TV coverage
- Network: ESPN
- Announcers: Sean McDonough, Mike Gottfried, and Alex Flanagan

The 2005 Pioneer PureVision Las Vegas Bowl was the 14th edition of the annual college football bowl game. It featured the California Golden Bears and the BYU Cougars.

== Game summary ==
Cal scored first on a 3-yard touchdown run by Marshawn Lynch to take a 7–0 lead with 11:56 left in the 1st quarter. He would finish the game with 194 yards rushing on 24 carries. Just 1 minute into the second quarter, BYU scored the equalizer, by a 19-yard touchdown pass from John Beck to Curtis Brown. Beck would finish the game 35 for 53 passing for 352 yards and 3 touchdowns.

With 12 minutes left in the half, Marshawn Lynch found the end zone for the second time, scoring from 23 yards out. With 38 seconds left in the half, Naufahu Tahi punched it in from 3 yards out to help BYU tie the game at 14. It appeared as though the game would be tied at halftime, but Cal came back quickly. With just 3 seconds in the half, Steve Levy threw a 42-yard bomb to star receiver DeSean Jackson helping Cal take a 21–14 lead to intermission.

In the third quarter, Marshawn Lynch scored on a long 35 yard touchdown run, as Cal increased its lead to 28–14 with 10:47 remaining in the third quarter. Cal appeared to blow the game wide open when Steve Levy and DeSean Jackson connected for the second time of the game, leading Cal to a 35–14 lead with only 4 minutes left in the third quarter.

In the fourth quarter, BYU made a bit of a comeback, as John Beck threw a 7-yard touchdown pass to Jonny Harline, cutting the lead to 35–21. With 5:35 left in the game, Beck threw a 9-yard touchdown pass to Todd Watkins, making it just 35–28. However, Cal was able to maintain that lead and win their first ever Las Vegas Bowl crown.
