= 2005 Insight Bowl =

- 17th Insight Bowl
Arizona State Sun Devils	Rutgers Scarlet Knights
(6–5)	(7–4)
Pac-10	Big East
45	40
Head coach: Dirk Koetter	Head coach: Greg Schiano
	1	2	3	4	Total
Arizona State	7	10	14	14	45
Rutgers	17	7	6	10	40
- Date: December 27, 2005
- Season: 2005
- Stadium: Chase Field
- Location: Phoenix, Arizona
- Referee: Joe Rider (ACC)
- Attendance: 43,536

United States TV coverage
- Network: ESPN
- Announcers: Brent Musburger (play-by-play); Gary Danielson (analyst)

The 2005 Insight Bowl was the 17th edition of the Insight Bowl. It featured the Arizona State Sun Devils and the Rutgers Scarlet Knights. Arizona State exploded offensively in the game scoring 45 points, and an Insight Bowl record 679 yards of total offense. This was the first bowl game for Rutgers since the 1978 Garden State Bowl (whom they coincidentally played ASU in as well) and their first bowl game outside of the school's native New Jersey.

== Game summary ==
Rutgers took an early 7–0 lead after Ryan Hart lobbed a 1-yard touchdown pass to Clark Harris. Arizona State responded with a 43-yard touchdown pass from Rudy Carpenter to Matt Miller, tying the game at 7. Rutgers answered with a 31-yard strike from Ryan Hart to Brian Leonard, making it 14–7 Rutgers. Jeremy Ito's 25-yard field goal made it 17–7, and capped the first quarter of scoring.

In the second quarter, Jessee Ainsworth kicked a 20-yard field goal to pull the Sun Devils to within 17–10. With 2:30 left in the half, Brian Leonard scored on a 3-yard touchdown run, bumping the Knights' lead to 24–10. Arizona State responded with a 1-yard touchdown pass from Carpenter to tight end Zach Miller making it 24–17 at halftime.

In the third quarter, Rudy Burgess scored from 1 yard out for ASU to tie it at 24. Jeremy Ito's 27-yard field goal flipped the lead back over to Rutgers 27–24. Arizona State took its first lead of the game on a 22-yard pass from Carpenter to Terry Richardson, making it 31–27 ASU. Jeremy Ito's 52-yard field goal cut the lead to 31–30 for Rutgers.

In the fourth quarter, Rutgers took the lead on a 48-yard Jeremy Ito field goal, giving Rutgers a 33–31 lead. Arizona State came back with a 42-yard touchdown pass from Rudy Carpenter to Matt Miller, and a two-point conversion to make it 39–33 ASU. With 4:26 remaining in the game, Rudy Burgess scored from 4 yards out, but the 2-point conversion attempt failed, making it 45–33 ASU. With 2 minutes left, Ryan Hart threw a 29-yard touchdown pass to Tres Moses making it 45–40 ASU. ASU then ran out the clock to claim the 2005 Insight Bowl.

This would be last Insight Bowl played at Chase Field, as Arizona State's Sun Devil Stadium would become the future host of the game.
