= 2005 UCLA Bruins football team =

American college football season

2005 UCLA Bruins football

Sun Bowl champion

Sun Bowl, W 50–38 vs. Northwestern
- Conference: Pacific-10 Conference

Ranking
- Coaches: No. 13
- AP: No. 16
- Record: 10–2 (6–2 Pac-10)
- Head coach: Karl Dorrell (3rd season)
- Offensive coordinator: Tom Cable (2nd season)
- Offensive scheme: Multiple pro-style
- Defensive coordinator: Larry Kerr (3rd season)
- Base defense: 4–3
- Home stadium: Rose Bowl

2005 Pacific-10 Conference football standings
	Conf.			Overall
Team	W		L	W		L
No. 2 USC † $	8	–	0	12	–	1
No. 13 Oregon	7	–	1	10	–	2
No. 16 UCLA	6	–	2	10	–	2
No. 25 California	4	–	4	8	–	4
Arizona State	4	–	4	7	–	5
Stanford	4	–	4	5	–	6
Oregon State	3	–	5	5	–	6
Arizona	2	–	6	3	–	8
Washington State	1	–	7	4	–	7
Washington	1	–	7	2	–	9
$ – Conference champion; † – USC later vacated 12 wins (8 in conference) and 1 loss due to NCAA sanctions.; Rankings from AP Poll

The 2005 UCLA Bruins football team represented the University of California, Los Angeles in the 2005 NCAA Division I-A football season. They played their home games at the Rose Bowl in Pasadena, California and were coached by Karl Dorrell. It was Dorrell's third season as the UCLA head coach. The Bruins finished 10–2 overall, and were third in the Pacific-10 Conference with a 6–2 record. The Bruins were invited to play in the Vitalis Sun Bowl vs. Northwestern on December 30, 2005. After giving up 22 unanswered points in the first quarter, the Bruins came back to win 50–38. The team was ranked #16 in the final AP Poll and #13 in the final Coaches Poll.

== Schedule ==
Date	Time	Opponent	Rank	Site	TV	Result	Attendance
September 3	7:00 pm	at San Diego State*		Qualcomm Stadium; San Diego, CA	ESPN2	W 44–21	50,710
September 10	7:00 pm	Rice*		Rose Bowl; Pasadena, CA	FSNW2	W 63–21	44,808
September 17	12:30 pm	No. 21 Oklahoma*		Rose Bowl; Pasadena, CA	ABC	W 41–24	56,522
October 1	7:15 pm	Washington	No. 20	Rose Bowl; Pasadena, CA	FSNW2	W 21–17	64,249
October 8	4:30 pm	No. 10 California	No. 20	Rose Bowl; Pasadena, CA (rivalry)	TBS	W 47–40	84,811
October 15	3:30 pm	at Washington State	No. 12	Martin Stadium; Pullman, WA	FSN	W 44–41 ^{OT}	35,117
October 22	4:00 pm	Oregon State^{†}	No. 8	Rose Bowl; Pasadena, CA	TBS	W 51–28	49,932
October 29	3:30 pm	at Stanford	No. 8	Stanford Stadium; Stanford, CA (rivalry)	FSN	W 30–27 ^{OT}	42,850
November 5	3:15 pm	at Arizona	No. 7	Arizona Stadium; Tucson, AZ	FSNW2	L 14–52	55,775
November 12	4:00 pm	Arizona State	No. 14	Rose Bowl; Pasadena, CA	ABC	W 45–35	84,983
December 3	1:30 pm	at No. 1 USC	No. 11	Los Angeles Memorial Coliseum; Los Angeles, CA (College GameDay, Victory Bell)	ABC	L 19–66	92,000
December 30	12:00 pm	vs. Northwestern*	No. 17	Sun Bowl; El Paso, TX (Sun Bowl)	CBS	W 50–38	50,426
*Non-conference game; ^{†}Homecoming; Rankings from AP Poll released prior to the game; All times are in Pacific time

== Rankings ==
Ranking movements Legend: ██ Increase in ranking ██ Decrease in ranking RV = Received votes
	Week															
Poll	Pre	1	2	3	4	5	6	7	8	9	10	11	12	13	14	Final
AP	RV	RV	RV	25	20	20	12	8	8	7	14	12	11	11	17	16
Coaches	RV	RV	RV	23	21	16	12	9	8	7	14	11	11	11	17	13
Harris	Not released				18	16	11	8	7	6	14	12	11	11	18	Not released
BCS	Not released							9	6	5	15	11	12	12	16	Not released

== Preseason ==
UCLA was ranked No. 24 by Lindy's and No. 19 by Blue Ribbon in the preseason polls.

== Game summaries ==
=== San Diego State ===
Team	1	2	3	4	Total
• UCLA	7	17	17	3	44
San Diego St	6	0	8	7	21

- Date: Saturday, September 3
- Location: Qualcomm Stadium, San Diego, California

=== Rice ===
Team	1	2	3	4	Total
Rice	7	7	7	0	21
• UCLA	21	28	0	14	63

- Date: Saturday, September 10
- Location: Rose Bowl, Pasadena, California

=== Oklahoma ===
#21 Oklahoma at UCLA

Team	1	2	3	4	Total
Oklahoma	7	3	7	7	24
• UCLA	10	3	7	21	41

- Date: Saturday, September 17
- Location: Rose Bowl, Pasadena, California
- Game start: 3:30 p.m. EST
- Source: ESPN

Scoring summary
1	10:47	OKLA	Travis Wilson 56-yard run (Garrett Hartley kick)	OKLA 7–0
1	5:31	UCLA	Andrew Baumgartner 19-yard pass from Drew Olson (Justin Medlock kick)	Tied 7–7
1	0:05	UCLA	Justin Medlock 44-yard field goal	UCLA 10–7
2	3:15	UCLA	Justin Medlock 51-yard field goal	UCLA 13–7
2	0:15	OKLA	Garrett Hartley 37-yard field goal	UCLA 13–10
3	13:13	UCLA	Spencer Havner 13-yard fumble return (Justin Medlock kick)	UCLA 20–10
3	3:25	OKLA	Adrian Peterson 11-yard run (Garrett Hartley kick)	UCLA 20–17
4	12:32	UCLA	Marcedes Lewis 19-yard pass from Drew Olson (Justin Medlock kick)	UCLA 27–17
4	7:16	UCLA	Chris Markey 7-yard pass from Drew Olson (Justin Medlock kick)	UCLA 34–17
4	3:49	OKLA	Rhett Bomar 16-yard run (Garrett Hartley kick)	UCLA 34–24
4	2:33	UCLA	Maurice Drew 9-yard run (Justin Medlock kick)	UCLA 41–24

=== Washington ===
Washington at #20 UCLA

Team	1	2	3	4	Total
Washington	3	7	7	0	17
• UCLA	0	0	7	14	21

- Date: Saturday, October 1
- Location: Rose Bowl, Pasadena, California

=== California ===
#10 California at #20 UCLA

Team	1	2	3	4	Total
California	14	13	10	3	40
• UCLA	7	14	7	19	47

- Date: Saturday, October 8
- Location: Rose Bowl, Pasadena, California

=== Washington State ===
#12 UCLA at Washington State

Team	1	2	3	4	OT	Total
• UCLA	0	14	7	17	6	44
Washington St	14	14	10	0	3	41

- Date: Saturday, October 15
- Location: Martin Stadium, Pullman, Washington
- Game start: 6:30 p.m. EST

Scoring summary
1	12:50	WSU	Jerome Harrison 57-yard run (Loren Langley kick)	Wash St 7–0
1	2:38	WSU	Jason Hill 6-yard pass from Alex Brink (Loren Langley kick)	Wash St 14–0
2	14:56	WSU	Michael Bumpus 9-yard pass from Alex Brink (Loren Langley kick)	Wash St 21–0
2	8:07	UCLA	Gavin Ketchum 21-yard pass from Drew Olson (Justin Medlock kick)	Wash St 21–7
2	5:36	WSU	Jerome Harrison 21-yard run (Loren Langley kick)	Wash St 28–7
2	:24	UCLA	Marcedes Lewis 4-yard pass from Drew Olson (Justin Medlock kick)	Wash St 28–14
3	8:21	UCLA	Maurice Drew 45-yard pass from Drew Olson (Justin Medlock kick)	Wash St 28–21
3	6:20	WSU	Loren Langley 48-yard field goal	Wash St 31–21
3	:23	WSU	Alex Brink 4-yard run (Loren Langley kick)	Wash St 38–21
4	14:32	UCLA	Marcedes Lewis 9-yard pass from Drew Olson (Justin Medlock kick)	Wash St 38–28
4	9:56	UCLA	Justin Medlock 36-yard field goal	Wash St 38–31
4	:44	UCLA	Marcus Everett 9-yard pass from Drew Olson (Justin Medlock kick)	Tie 38–38
OT		WSU	Loren Langley 37-yard field goal	Wash St 41–38
OT		UCLA	Maurice Drew 1-yard run	UCLA 44–41

=== Oregon State ===
Oregon State at #8 UCLA

Team	1	2	3	4	Total
Oregon St	7	7	7	7	28
• UCLA	10	21	10	10	51

- Date: Saturday, October 22
- Location: Rose Bowl, Pasadena, California

=== Stanford ===
#8 UCLA at Stanford

Team	1	2	3	4	OT	Total
• UCLA	0	3	0	21	6	30
Stanford	7	0	7	10	3	27

- Date: Saturday, October 29
- Location: Stanford Stadium, Stanford, California
- Game start: 6:30 p.m. EST

Scoring summary
1	7:09	Stanford	J.R. Lemon 13-yard pass from Trent Edwards (Michael Sgroi kick)	Stanford 7–0
2	10:19	UCLA	Justin Medlock 32-yard field goal	Stanford 7–3
3	4:16	Stanford	J.R. Lemon 9-yard pass from Trent Edwards (Michael Sgroi kick)	Stanford 14–3
4	13:18	Stanford	Michael Sgroi 40-yard field goal	Stanford 17–3
4	8:26	Stanford	Nick Frank 7-yard run (Michael Sgroi kick)	Stanford 24–3
4	7:04	UCLA	Maurice Drew 6-yard run (Justin Medlock kick)	Stanford 24–10
4	4:43	UCLA	Joe Cowan 31-yard pass from Drew Olson (Justin Medlock kick)	Stanford 24–17
4	0:46	UCLA	Maurice Drew 1-yard run (Justin Medlock kick)	Tie 24–24
OT		Stanford	Michael Sgroi 42-yard field goal	Stanford 27–24
OT		UCLA	Brandon Breazell 23-yard pass from Drew Olson	UCLA 30–27

=== Arizona ===
#7 UCLA at Arizona

Team	1	2	3	4	Total
UCLA	0	7	0	7	14
• Arizona	21	10	21	0	52

- Date: Saturday, November 5
- Location: Arizona Stadium, Tucson, Arizona

=== Arizona State ===
Arizona State at #14 UCLA

Team	1	2	3	4	Total
Arizona St	14	14	0	7	35
• UCLA	21	7	14	3	45

- Date: Saturday, November 12
- Location: Rose Bowl, Pasadena, California

=== USC ===
#11 UCLA at #1 USC

Team	1	2	3	4	Total
UCLA	0	6	0	13	19
• USC	10	21	21	14	66

- Date: Saturday, December 3
- Location: Los Angeles Memorial Coliseum, Los Angeles, California

On June 10, 2010, the NCAA found that Reggie Bush was ineligible for college athletics during the 2005 season, and USC was forced to vacate all wins from that year.

=== Northwestern—Sun Bowl ===
Northwestern vs. #17 UCLA
Sun Bowl

Team	1	2	3	4	Total
Northwestern	22	0	3	13	38
• UCLA	7	22	7	14	50

- Date: Friday, December 30
- Location: Sun Bowl, El Paso, Texas

UCLA overcame a 22–0 deficit to Northwestern in the first quarter to win 50–38.
