= 2005 Arizona State Sun Devils football team =

American college football season

2005 Arizona State Sun Devils football

Insight Bowl champion

Insight Bowl, W 45–40 vs. Rutgers
- Conference: Pacific-10 Conference
- Record: 7–5 (4–4 Pac-10)
- Head coach: Dirk Koetter (5th season)
- Defensive coordinator: Bill Miller (1st season)
- Home stadium: Sun Devil Stadium

Uniform

2005 Pacific-10 Conference football standings
	Conf.			Overall
Team	W		L	W		L
No. 2 USC † $	8	–	0	12	–	1
No. 13 Oregon	7	–	1	10	–	2
No. 16 UCLA	6	–	2	10	–	2
No. 25 California	4	–	4	8	–	4
Arizona State	4	–	4	7	–	5
Stanford	4	–	4	5	–	6
Oregon State	3	–	5	5	–	6
Arizona	2	–	6	3	–	8
Washington State	1	–	7	4	–	7
Washington	1	–	7	2	–	9
$ – Conference champion; † – USC later vacated 12 wins (8 in conference) and 1 loss due to NCAA sanctions.; Rankings from AP Poll

The 2005 Arizona State Sun Devils football team represented Arizona State University as a member of the Pacific-10 Conference (Pac-10) during the 2005 NCAA Division I-A football season. Led by fifth-year head coach Dirk Koetter, the Sun Devils compiled an overall record of 7–5 with a mark of 4–4 in conference play, placing in a three-way tie for fourth place in the Pac-10. Arizona State was invited to the Insight Bowl, where the Sun Devils defeated Rutgers. The team played home games at Sun Devil Stadium in Tempe, Arizona.

The September 10 game against LSU was scheduled to be played at Tiger Stadium in Baton Rouge, Louisiana, but was moved to Tempe due to the aftermath of Hurricane Katrina. LSU's Pete Maravich Assembly Center, which is just north of Tiger Stadium, was serving as a triage center for seriously injured victims from the storm. Arizona State had to grant dispensation for ESPN to televise the game, as the Pac-10 did not have a broadcast contract in place with ESPN at the time, and for the use of Southeastern Conference game officials in a Pac-10 stadium.

== Schedule ==
Date	Time	Opponent	Rank	Site	TV	Result	Attendance	Source
September 1	7:00 pm	Temple*	No. 20	Sun Devil Stadium; Tempe, AZ		W 63–16	50,049	
September 10	6:15 pm	No. 5 LSU*	No. 15	Sun Devil Stadium; Tempe, AZ	ESPN	L 31–35	63,210	
September 17	7:00 pm	Northwestern*	No. 18	Sun Devil Stadium; Tempe, AZ		W 52–21	55,029	
September 24	7:00 pm	at Oregon State	No. 18	Reser Stadium; Corvallis, OR	TBS	W 42–24	41,374	
October 1	12:30 pm	No. 1 USC	No. 14	Sun Devil Stadium; Tempe, Arizona (College GameDay)	ABC	L 28–38	71,706	
October 8	7:15 pm	No. 25 Oregon	No. 17	Sun Devil Stadium; Tempe, AZ	FSN	L 17–31	62,789	
October 22	2:00 pm	at Stanford		Stanford Stadium; Stanford, CA		L 35–45	31,711	
October 29	3:30 pm	Washington^{†}		Sun Devil Stadium; Tempe, AZ		W 44–20	57,678	
November 5	2:00 pm	at Washington State		Martin Stadium; Pullman, WA		W 27–24	31,054	
November 12	5:00 pm	at No. 14 UCLA		Rose Bowl; Pasadena, CA	ABC	L 35–45	84,983	
November 25	1:00 pm	Arizona		Sun Devil Stadium; Tempe, AZ (rivalry)	FSN	W 23–20	67,635	
December 27	6:30 pm	vs. Rutgers*		Bank One Ballpark; Phoenix, AZ (Insight Bowl)	ESPN	W 45–40	43,536	
*Non-conference game; ^{†}Homecoming; Rankings from AP Poll released prior to the game; All times are in Mountain time

== Game summaries ==
=== Arizona ===
Team	1	2	3	4	Total
Arizona	3	14	3	0	20
• Arizona St	5	0	7	11	23

- Date: November 25
- Location: Sun Devil Stadium, Tempe, Arizona
- Game start: 3:00 p.m. EST

Scoring summary
1	10:58	ASU	Jesse Ainsworth 32 yard field goal	Arizona St 3–0
1	7:36	ARIZ	Nick Folk 37 yard field goal	Tie 3–3
1	3:19	ASU	Safety	Arizona St 5–3
2	9:37	ARIZ	Travis Bell 7 yard pass from Willie Tuitama (Nick Folk kick)	Arizona 10–5
2	2:19	ARIZ	Mike Bell 1 yard run (Nick Folk kick)	Arizona 17–5
3	8:01	ARIZ	Nick Folk 47 yard field goal	Arizona 20–5
3	5:48	ASU	Rudy Burgess 7 yard run (Jesse Ainsworth kick)	Arizona 20–12
4	7:52	ASU	Terry Richardson 71 yard punt return (Zach Miller pass from Rudy Carpenter)	Tie 20–20
4	:09	ASU	Jesse Ainsworth 20 yard field goal	Arizona St 23–20
