= 2005 California Golden Bears football team =

American college football season

2005 California Golden Bears football

Las Vegas Bowl champion

Las Vegas Bowl, W 35–28 vs. BYU
- Conference: Pacific-10 Conference

Ranking
- Coaches: No. 25
- AP: No. 25
- Record: 8–4 (4–4 Pac-10)
- Head coach: Jeff Tedford (4th season)
- Offensive coordinator: George Cortez (4th season)
- Offensive scheme: Pro-style
- Defensive coordinator: Bob Gregory (4th season)
- Base defense: 4–3
- Home stadium: California Memorial Stadium

2005 Pacific-10 Conference football standings
	Conf.			Overall
Team	W		L	W		L
No. 2 USC † $	8	–	0	12	–	1
No. 13 Oregon	7	–	1	10	–	2
No. 16 UCLA	6	–	2	10	–	2
No. 25 California	4	–	4	8	–	4
Arizona State	4	–	4	7	–	5
Stanford	4	–	4	5	–	6
Oregon State	3	–	5	5	–	6
Arizona	2	–	6	3	–	8
Washington State	1	–	7	4	–	7
Washington	1	–	7	2	–	9
$ – Conference champion; † – USC later vacated 12 wins (8 in conference) and 1 loss due to NCAA sanctions.; Rankings from AP Poll

The 2005 California Golden Bears football team represented the University of California, Berkeley in the 2005 NCAA Division I-A football season. They played their home games at California Memorial Stadium in Berkeley, California and were coached by Jeff Tedford.

At the beginning of the season quarterback Nate Longshore was chosen to succeed Aaron Rodgers as the starting quarterback. However he was injured during the first game of the season and replaced by Joe Ayoob for the next nine games. The Bears got off to their best start, at 5–0, since Steve Mariucci coached them in 1996. But the Golden Bears subsequently stumbled, losing four of their next five games. Third string quarterback Steve Levy, replaced Ayoob, and was named as the starter for the Big Game. Levy played as fullback during the previous season, in his first time as a starter he led the team to defeat Stanford 27-3. The team ended up in the 2005 Las Vegas Bowl, where they beat BYU, 35–28.

== Schedule ==
Date	Time	Opponent	Rank	Site	TV	Result	Attendance	Source
September 3	2:00 p.m.	Sacramento State*	No. 19	California Memorial Stadium; Berkeley, CA	CSN	W 41–3	65,938	
September 10	12:30 p.m.	at Washington	No. 16	Husky Stadium; Seattle, WA	ABC	W 56–17	57,775	
September 17	2:00 p.m.	Illinois*	No. 15	California Memorial Stadium; Berkeley, CA		W 35–20	57,657	
September 23	7:00 p.m.	at New Mexico State*	No. 13	Aggie Memorial Stadium; Las Cruces, NM	ESPN	W 41–13	11,312	
October 1	2:30 p.m.	Arizona^{†}	No. 12	California Memorial Stadium; Berkeley, CA	TBS	W 28–0	55,944	
October 8	4:30 p.m.	at No. 20 UCLA	No. 10	Rose Bowl; Pasadena, CA (rivalry)	TBS	L 40–47	84,811	
October 15	12:30 p.m.	Oregon State	No. 18	California Memorial Stadium; Berkeley, CA	ABC	L 20–23	57,174	
October 22	7:15 p.m.	Washington State	No. 25	California Memorial Stadium; Berkeley, CA	FSN	W 42–38	52,569	
November 5	12:30 p.m.	at No. 15 Oregon	No. 23	Autzen Stadium; Eugene, OR	ABC	L 20–27 ^{OT}	58,309	
November 12	12:30 p.m.	No. 1 USC		California Memorial Stadium; Berkeley, CA	ABC	L 10–35	72,981	
November 19	4:00 p.m.	at Stanford		Stanford Stadium; Stanford, CA (Big Game)	ABC	W 27–3	71,743	
December 22	5:00 p.m.	vs. BYU*		Sam Boyd Stadium; Whitney, NV (Las Vegas Bowl)	ESPN	W 35–28	40,053	
*Non-conference game; ^{†}Homecoming; Rankings from AP Poll released prior to the game; All times are in Pacific time

== Game summaries ==
=== Washington ===
#16 California at Washington

Team	1	2	3	4	Total
• California	7	21	7	21	56
Washington	7	3	7	0	17

- Date: September 10
- Location: Husky Stadium, Seattle, WA
- Source: ESPN

Scoring summary
1	14:40	Washington	Sonny Shackleford 56-yard pass from Isaiah Stanback (Evan Knudson kick)	Washington 7-0
1	2:16	California	Robert Jordan 9-yard pass from Joseph Ayoob (Tom Schneider kick)	Tie 7-7
2	11:43	California	Robert Jordan 24-yard pass from Joseph Ayoob (Tom Schneider kick)	California 14-7
2	8:25	Washington	Evan Knudson 46-yard field goal	California 14-10
2	2:50	California	Robert Jordan 58-yard pass from Joseph Ayoob (Tom Schneider kick)	California 21-10
2	1:57	California	David Gray 14-yard pass from Joseph Ayoob (Tom Schneider kick)	California 28-10
3	11:07	Washington	Craig Chambers 39-yard pass from Isaiah Stanback (Evan Knudson kick)	California 28-17
3	1:43	California	Marcus O'Keith 5-yard run (Tom Schneider kick)	California 35-17
4	7:20	California	Marcus O'Keith 71-yard run (Tom Schneider kick)	California 42-17
4	6:25	California	Dante Hughes 41-yard interception return (Tom Schneider kick)	California 49-17
4	:00	California	Justin Forsett 35-yard run (Tom Schneider kick)	California 56-17

=== USC ===
#1 USC at California

Team	1	2	3	4	Total
• USC	7	14	7	7	35
California	3	0	0	7	10

- Location: California Memorial Stadium, Berkeley, CA

Cal then hosted the #1-ranked USC Trojans, led by head coach Pete Carroll and an offense including Heisman Trophy-winning quarterback Matt Leinart and running back Reggie Bush. The Trojans scored first after Ayoob's first of four interceptions in the game, on a LenDale White rush. Ayoob recovered after the interception, and led the Bears to a field goal to cut their deficit to four at the end of the first quarter. In the second quarter, Leinart rushed for a pair of touchdowns to give the Trojans a 21–3 lead at half-time. After a pair of White rushing touchdowns, the Bears scored again on a Chris Manderino rush that ended scoring in the game, with the Trojans winning 35–10. With the win, the Trojans clinched at least a share of the Pac-10 title.

=== Stanford ===
Team	1	2	3	4	Total
• California	6	0	7	14	27
Stanford	0	3	0	0	3

- Date: November 19
- Location: Stanford Stadium, Stanford, CA
- Game start: 4:00 p.m. PST

Scoring summary
1	9:05	CAL	DeSean Jackson 56-yard pass from Steve Levy (kick blocked)	CAL 6-0
2	9:54	STAN	Mike Sgroi 37-yard field goal	CAL 6-3
3	9:33	CAL	Justin Forsett 21-yard run (Tom Schneider kick)	CAL 13-3
4	7:14	CAL	Marshawn Lynch 3-yard run (Tom Schneider kick)	CAL 20-3
4	3:31	CAL	Craig Stevens 14-yard pass from Terrell Williams (Tom Schneider kick)	CAL 27-3

Steve Levy had 125 yards passing and Marshawn Lynch had 123 yards running.
