= Bill Doba =

American football player and coach (1940–2026)

Biographical details
- Born: September 7, 1940; South Bend, Indiana, U.S.
- Died: August 28, 2026 (aged 85)
- Education: Ball State College, 1962

Playing career
- 1959–1960: Ball State
- Positions: Halfback, defensive back

Coaching career (HC unless noted)
- 1962–1964: Goshen HS (IN) (assistant)
- 1965–1966: Angola HS (IN) (assistant)
- 1968–1970: Goshen HS (IN)
- 1971–1976: Mishawaka HS (IN)
- 1977–1982: Indiana (assistant)
- 1983–1986: Purdue (assistant)
- 1987–1988: Citadel (DC/OLB)
- 1989–1990: Washington State (LB)
- 1991–1993: Washington State (AHC/LB)
- 1994–2002: Washington State (AHC/DC/LB)
- 2003–2007: Washington State

Head coaching record
- Overall: 30–29 (.517)
- Bowls: 1–0

Accomplishments and honors

Awards
- Pac-10 Coach of the Year (2003)

William Anthony Doba (September 7, 1940 – August 28, 2026) was an American college football coach. He was the head coach at Washington State University, where he led the Cougars for five seasons, from 2003 through 2007, and was fired on November 26.

== Early life and career ==
Born in South Bend, Indiana, Doba grew up in New Carlisle and graduated from New Carlisle High School in 1958. He played halfback and defensive back for two years at Ball State College in Muncie before hip injuries derailed his college football career. After graduating from Ball State, he started his coaching career at Goshen High School in Indiana as an assistant. After two years there, he worked as the head coach at Angola High School for two years, then went back to Goshen High for three years as the head coach. During this time, he earned a master's degree from Western Michigan University in physical education. His high school coaching career ended with a six-year stay at Mishawaka High School in Indiana, where he led his 1974 team to the big school state championship game.

Moving to the college ranks, Doba became an assistant to Lee Corso at Indiana University for six years, coaching linebackers for five years and quarterbacks/wide receivers for one. He moved to Purdue University to work as the outside linebackers coach for three years and the tight end/tackles coach for one year. He left Purdue to become defensive coordinator at The Citadel in South Carolina, his first job outside the state of Indiana. He left The Citadel after two years to join the staff of new head coach Mike Price at Washington State University in Pullman.

== At Washington State ==
In 1989, Doba became the linebackers coach at Washington State under Price. In 1991, he became a defensive assistant. In 1994, he became defensive coordinator and also reclaimed his linebackers coaching job. After Price left Washington State for the University of Alabama at the end of the 2002 season, Doba was named head coach, and took office immediately following the Rose Bowl.

In his first season as head coach in 2003, Doba led the Cougars to a 10–3 record, with a Holiday Bowl win over Texas and a #9 final ranking. He shared the Pac-10 Coach of the Year award in 2003 with Pete Carroll of USC. The Holiday Bowl win was a high point of Doba's tenure and was one of the top wins in WSU history. His teams won three of five Apple Cup rivalry games against Washington, in 2004, 2005, and 2007.

Unfortunately, the Cougars slumped after their sterling 2003 season, and Doba was unable to put together another winning team. Their 42–35 victory in the 100th Apple Cup in 2007 was not enough to save Doba's job. It was announced that Doba would not return for the 2008 season after compiling a 5–7 record for the 2007 season, the Cougars' fourth straight non-winning season. (WSU was 6–6 in 2006, but not invited to a bowl game.) He departed with an overall record of 30–29 (.508) and was 17–25 (.405) in conference play.

== Personal life and death ==
Doba and his wife, Judy, were married for over forty-three years and had three children, a son and two daughters. Judy died on April 21, 2006, after a four-year battle with ovarian cancer.

Doba was inducted into the Mishawaka Hall of Fame in 1986, and later inducted into the Indiana Hall of Fame in 2001. He left Pullman and returned to the Midwest to be closer to his children and grandchildren, and resided in southwestern Michigan at Birch Lake, near Vandalia.

Doba died on August 28, 2026, at the age of 85, after having a stroke the week prior.

== Head coaching record ==
| Year | Team | Overall | Conference | Standing | Bowl/playoffs | Coaches^{#} | AP^{°} |
|---|---|---|---|---|---|---|---|
Washington State Cougars (Pacific-10 Conference) (2003–2007)
| 2003 | Washington State | 10–3 | 6–2 | 2nd | W Holiday | 9 | 9 |
| 2004 | Washington State | 5–6 | 3–5 | 7th | | | |
| 2005 | Washington State | 4–7 | 1–7 | T–8th | | | |
| 2006 | Washington State | 6–6 | 4–5 | T–5th | | | |
| 2007 | Washington State | 5–7 | 3–6 | T–7th | | | |
| Washington State: | | 30–29 | 17–25 | | | | |
| Total: | | 30–29 | | | | | |
^{#}Rankings from final Coaches Poll.; ^{°}Rankings from final AP Poll.
