= James Sims (American football) =

American football player (born 1983)

No. 30
- Position: Running back

Personal information
- Born: February 14, 1983 (age 43); Phoenix, Arizona
- Listed height: 6 ft 1 in (1.85 m)
- Listed weight: 211 lb (96 kg)

Career information
- High school: Valley (Winchester, Nevada)
- College: Washington

Career history
- New York Giants (2006)

Awards and highlights
- Washington Offensive MVP (2005)

Career NFL statistics
- Games played: 2
- Stats at Pro Football Reference

James Sims Jr. (born February 14, 1983, in Phoenix, Arizona) was an American football running back in the National Football League. He played college football at the University of Washington.

He was signed by the New York Giants as a rookie free agent on May 13, 2006, and played during the preseason, carrying the ball 33 times for 98 yards. He signed with the full squad on December 19, 2006.
