= Blair Phillips =

American football player (born 1984)

No. 59, 21
- Position: Linebacker

Personal information
- Born: March 5, 1984 (age 42); Oakland, California, U.S.
- Listed height: 6 ft 2 in (1.88 m)
- Listed weight: 245 lb (111 kg)

Career information
- High school: Alexandria (LA) Bolton
- College: Oregon
- NFL draft: 2007: undrafted

Career history
- Dallas Cowboys (2007–2008)*; New York Jets (2008–2009)*; Arkansas Diamonds (2010)
- * Offseason or practice squad member only

Blair Phillips (born March 5, 1984) is an American former professional football linebacker who spent time on the practice squads for both the Dallas Cowboys and the New York Jets of the National Football League. He also played for the Arkansas Diamonds of the Indoor Football League. He played college football at Mississippi Gulf Coast Community College before finishing his career at the University of Oregon.

== College career ==
Phillips played at Mississippi Gulf Coast Community College during his freshman and sophomore years of college. He transferred to the University of Oregon and is famous for blocking the game winning kick at the end of a controversial victory over Oklahoma in 2006.

== Professional career ==
Phillips signed a May 2007 free agent contract with the Dallas Cowboys. Phillips then signed a 2008 free agent contract with the New York Jets. In 2010, Phillips played with the Arkansas Diamonds of the Indoor Football League (IFL).

== After football ==
Currently, he is a head football coach at University Academy of Central Louisiana in Alexandria, Louisiana.
