= 2005 NCAA Division I-A football rankings =

- Season: 2005
- Bowl season: 2005–06 bowl games
- Preseason No. 1: USC
- End of season champions: Texas
- Conference with most teams in final AP poll: ACC, SEC (5)

Three human polls and one formulaic ranking make up the 2005 NCAA Division I-A football rankings, in addition to various publications' preseason polls. Unlike most sports, college football's governing body, the National Collegiate Athletic Association (NCAA), does not bestow a National Championship title for Division I-A football. That title is bestowed by different polling agencies. There are several polls that currently exist. The main weekly polls are the AP Poll and Coaches Poll. About halfway through the season, two additional polls are released; the Harris Interactive Poll and the Bowl Championship Series (BCS) standings.

During the 2005 season, 34 different teams appeared in the rankings by the major polls, but two teams, USC and Texas, held the top two spots throughout the course of the entire season.

== Legend ==
| | Increase in ranking |
| | Decrease in ranking |
| | Not ranked previous week |
| | Selected for BCS National Championship Game |
| (#–#) | Win–loss record |
| (Italics) | Number of first place votes |
| т | Tied with team above or below also with this symbol |

== AP Poll ==
This season was the first season since the inception of the BCS that the AP Poll was not included in the BCS formula. The BCS created the Harris Interactive Poll to serve as its replacement.

| | Preseason | Week 1 Sept 6 | Week 2 Sept 11 | Week 3 Sept 18 | Week 4 Sept 25 | Week 5 Oct 2 | Week 6 Oct 9 | Week 7 Oct 16 | Week 8 Oct 23 | Week 9 Oct 30 | Week 10 Nov 6 | Week 11 Nov 13 | Week 12 Nov 20 | Week 13 Nov 27 | Week 14 Dec 4 | Week 15 (Final) Jan 5 | |
| 1. | USC (60) | USC (1–0) (61) | USC (2–0) (56) | USC (2–0) (57) | USC (3–0) (59) | USC (4–0) (59) | USC (5–0) (58) | USC (6–0) (57) | USC (7–0) (55) | USC (8–0) (57) | USC (9–0) (57) | USC (10–0) (56) | USC (11–0) (50) | USC (11–0) (55) | USC (12–0) (56) | Texas (13-0) (65) | 1. |
| 2. | Texas (4) | Texas (1–0) (4) | Texas (2–0) (8) | Texas (3–0) (8) | Texas (3–0) (6) | Texas (4–0) (6) | Texas (5–0) (7) | Texas (6–0) (8) | Texas (7–0) (10) | Texas (8–0) (8) | Texas (9–0) (8) | Texas (10–0) (9) | Texas (10–0) (14) | Texas (11–0) (10) | Texas (12–0) (9) | USC (12-1) | 2. |
| 3. | Tennessee (13) | Michigan (1–0) | LSU (1–0) | LSU (1–0) | Virginia Tech (4–0) | Virginia Tech (5–0) | Virginia Tech (6–0) | Virginia Tech (6–0) | Virginia Tech (7–0) | Virginia Tech (7–0) | Miami (FL) (7–1) | Miami (FL) (8–1) | LSU (9–1) | LSU (10–1) | Penn State (10–1) | Penn State (11–1) | 3. |
| 4. | Michigan | Ohio State (1–0) | Virginia Tech (2–0) | Virginia Tech (2–0) | LSU (1–0) | Florida State (4–0) | Florida State (5–0) | Georgia (6–0) | Georgia (7–0) | Alabama (8–0) | Alabama (9–0) | LSU (8–1) | Penn State (10–1) | Penn State (10–1) | Ohio State (9–2) | Ohio State (10–2) | 4. |
| 5. | LSU | LSU (0–0) | Tennessee (1–0) | Florida (3–0) | Florida (4–0) | Georgia (4–0) | Georgia (5–0) | Alabama (6–0) | Alabama (7–0) | Miami (FL) (6–1) | LSU (7–1) | Penn State (9–1) | Virginia Tech (9–1) | Virginia Tech (10–1) | Notre Dame (9–2) | West Virginia (11–1) | 5. |
| 6. | Ohio State | Tennessee (1–0) | Florida (2–0) | Florida State (3–0) | Florida State (3–0) | Ohio State (3–1) | Alabama (5–0) | Miami (FL) (5–1) | Miami (FL) (5–1) | LSU (6–1) | Penn State (9–1) | Notre Dame (7–2) | Notre Dame (8–2) | Ohio State (9–2) | Oregon (10–1) | LSU (11–2) | 6. |
| 7. | Oklahoma | Virginia Tech (1–0) | Georgia (2–0) | Georgia (3–0) | Georgia (4–0) | Alabama (5–0) | Miami (FL) (4–1) | LSU (4–1) | LSU (5–1) | UCLA (8–0) | Notre Dame (6–2) | Virginia Tech (8–1) | Ohio State (9–2) | Notre Dame (9–2) | Auburn (9–2) | Virginia Tech (11–2) | 7. |
| 8. | Virginia Tech | Iowa (1–0) | Florida State (2–0) | Ohio State (2–1) | Ohio State (3–1) | Tennessee (3–1) | Penn State (6–0) | UCLA (6–0) | UCLA (7–0) | Notre Dame (5–2) | Virginia Tech (8–1) | Alabama (9–1) | Oregon (10–1) | Oregon (10–1) | Georgia (10–2) | Alabama (10–2) | 8. |
| 9. | Miami (FL) | Georgia (1–0) | Ohio State (1–1) | Louisville (2–0) | Miami (FL) (2–1) | Miami (FL) (3–1) | Notre Dame (4–1) | Notre Dame (4–2) | Notre Dame (5–2) | Florida State (7–1) | Georgia (7–1) | Ohio State (8–2) | Auburn (9–2) | Auburn (9–2) | Miami (FL) (9–2) | Notre Dame (9–3) | 9. |
| 10. | Florida | Florida (1–0) | Notre Dame (2–0) | Tennessee (1–1) | Tennessee (1–1) | California (5–0) | LSU (3–1) | Texas Tech (6–0) | Florida State (6–1) | Penn State (8–1) | Ohio State (7–2) | Oregon (9–1) | Miami (FL) (8–2) | Miami (FL) (9–2) | LSU (10–2) | Georgia (10–3) | 10. |
| 11. | Iowa | Florida State (1–0) | Louisville (1–0) | Purdue (2–0) | Michigan State (4–0) | LSU (2–1) | Florida (5–1) | Florida State (5–1) | Penn State (7–1) | Georgia (7–1) | Oregon (8–1) | Auburn (8–2) | UCLA (9–1) | UCLA (9–1) | West Virginia (10–1) | TCU (11–1) | 11. |
| 12. | Louisville (1) | Louisville (1–0) | Purdue (1–0) | Miami (FL) (1–1) | California (4–0) | Notre Dame (4–1) | UCLA (5–0) | Penn State (6–1) | Ohio State (5–2) | Ohio State (6–2) | Florida (7–2) | UCLA (9–1) | West Virginia (8–1) | West Virginia (9–1) | Virginia Tech (10–2) | Florida (9–3) т | 12. |
| 13. | Georgia | Purdue (0–0) | Miami (FL) (0–1) | California (3–0) | Notre Dame (3–1) | Florida (4–1) | Texas Tech (5–0) | Boston College (6–1) | Boston College (6–1) | Florida (6–2) | Texas Tech (8–1) | West Virginia (8–1) | Georgia (8–2) | Georgia (9–2) | Alabama (9–2) | Oregon (10–2) т | 13. |
| 14. | Florida State | Miami (FL) (0–1) | Michigan (1–1) | Michigan (2–1) | Arizona State (3–1) | Wisconsin (5–0) | Boston College (5–1) | Ohio State (4–2) | Oregon (7–1) | Wisconsin (8–1) | UCLA (8–1) | Georgia (7–2) | Alabama (9–2) | Alabama (9–2) | TCU (10–1) | Auburn (9–3) | 14. |
| 15. | Purdue | Arizona State (1–0) | California (2–0) | Georgia Tech (3–0) | Alabama (4–0) | Texas Tech (4–0) | Ohio State (3–2) | Oregon (6–1) | Wisconsin (7–1) | Oregon (7–1) | Auburn (7–2) | TCU (10–1) | TCU (10–1) | TCU (10–1) | Louisville (9–2) | Wisconsin (10–3) | 15. |
| 16. | Auburn | California (1–0) | Georgia Tech (2–0) | Notre Dame (2–1) | Texas Tech (3–0) | Penn State (5–0) | Michigan State (4–1) | Auburn (5–1) | Florida (5–2) | Texas Tech (7–1) | West Virginia (7–1) | Fresno State (8–1) | Fresno State (8–2) | Louisville (8–2) | Florida (8–3) | UCLA (10–2) | 16. |
| 17. | Texas A&M | Georgia Tech (1–0) | Boston College (2–0) | Michigan State (3–0) | Wisconsin (4–0) | Arizona State (3–2) | Tennessee (3–2) | Tennessee (3–2) | Texas Tech (6–1) | Auburn (6–2) | Florida State (7–2) | Michigan (7–3) | Louisville (7–2) | Florida (8–3) | UCLA (9–2) | Miami (FL) (9–3) | 17. |
| 18. | Boise State | Oklahoma (0–1) | Arizona State (1–1) | Arizona State (2–1) | Minnesota (4–0) | Boston College (4–1) | California (5–1) | Florida (5–2) | West Virginia (6–1) | West Virginia (6–1) | TCU (9–1) | Louisville (7–2) | Texas Tech (9–2) | Texas Tech (9–2) | Texas Tech (9–2) | Boston College (9–3) | 18. |
| 19. | California | Boston College (1–0) | Texas Tech (1–0) | Texas Tech (2–0) | Virginia (3–0) | Michigan State (4–1) | Louisville (4–1) | Wisconsin (6–1) | Auburn (5–2) | Boston College (6–2) | Wisconsin (8–2) | South Carolina (7–3) | Florida (7–3) | Boston College (8–3) | Boston College (8–3) | Louisville (9–3) | 19. |
| 20. | Arizona State | Notre Dame (1–0) | Clemson (2–0) | Alabama (3–0) | UCLA (3–0) | UCLA (4–0) | Oregon (5–1) | West Virginia (6–1) | TCU (7–1) | TCU (8–1) | Fresno State (7–1) | Florida (7–3) | Georgia Tech (7–3) | Michigan (7–4) | Michigan (7–4) | Texas Tech (9–3) | 20. |
| 21. | Texas Tech | Texas Tech (0–0) | Oklahoma (1–1) | Iowa (2–1) | Boston College (3–1) | Michigan (3–2) | Auburn (4–1) | TCU (6–1) | Northwestern (5–2) | Fresno State (6–1) | Michigan (6–3) | Texas Tech (8–2) | Boston College (8–3) | Wisconsin (9–3) | Wisconsin (9–3) | Clemson (8–4) | 21. |
| 22. | Boston College | TCU (1–0) | Iowa (1–1) | Iowa State (2–0) | Purdue (2–1) | Auburn (4–1) | Minnesota (5–1) | Michigan State (4–2) | Fresno State (5–1) | Michigan (6–3) | Colorado (7–2) | Florida State (7–3) | Michigan (7–4) | Clemson (7–4) | Florida State (8–4) | Oklahoma (8–4) | 22. |
| 23. | Pittsburgh | Virginia (1–0) | Fresno State (1–0) | Virginia (2–0) | Iowa State (3–0) | Louisville (3–1) | Wisconsin (5–1) | Virginia (4–2) | Tennessee (3–3) | California (6–2) | Louisville (6–2) | Boston College (7–3) | Florida State (7–3) | Fresno State (8–3) | Clemson (7–4) | Florida State (8–5) | 23. |
| 24. | Fresno State | Fresno State (0–0) | Iowa State (2–0) | Oregon (3–0) | Louisville (2–1) | Georgia Tech (3–1) | Colorado (4–1) | Fresno State (4–1) | California (6–2) | Louisville (5–2) | Georgia Tech (6–2) | UTEP (8–1) | Wisconsin (8–3) | Georgia Tech (7–4) | Georgia Tech (7–4) | Nebraska (8–4) | 24. |
| 25. | Virginia | Clemson (1–0) | Virginia (1–0) | UCLA (3–0) | Georgia Tech (3–1) | Oregon (4–1) | TCU (5–1) | California (5–2) | Michigan (5–3) | Colorado (6–2) | Northwestern (6–3) | Wisconsin (8–3) | Clemson (7–4) | Iowa (7–4) | Iowa (7–4) | California (8–4) | 25. |
| | Preseason | Week 1 Sept 6 | Week 2 Sept 11 | Week 3 Sept 18 | Week 4 Sept 25 | Week 5 Oct 2 | Week 6 Oct 9 | Week 7 Oct 16 | Week 8 Oct 23 | Week 9 Oct 30 | Week 10 Nov 6 | Week 11 Nov 13 | Week 12 Nov 20 | Week 13 Nov 27 | Week 14 Dec 4 | Week 15 (Final) Jan 5 | |
| | | Dropped: Auburn; Texas A&M; Boise State; Pittsburgh | Dropped: TCU | Dropped: Boston College; Clemson; Oklahoma; Fresno State | Dropped: Michigan; Iowa; Oregon | Dropped: Minnesota; Virginia; Purdue; Iowa State | Dropped: Arizona State; Michigan; Georgia Tech | Dropped: Louisville; Minnesota; Colorado | Dropped: Michigan State; Virginia | Dropped: Northwestern; Tennessee | Dropped: Boston College; California | Dropped: Colorado; Georgia Tech; Northwestern | Dropped: South Carolina; UTEP | Dropped: Florida State | Dropped: Fresno State | Dropped: Michigan; Georgia Tech; Iowa | |

== Coaches Poll ==
| | Preseason | Week 1 Sept 6 | Week 2 Sept 11 | Week 3 Sept 18 | Week 4 Sept 25 | Week 5 Oct 2 | Week 6 Oct 9 | Week 7 Oct 16 | Week 8 Oct 23 | Week 9 Oct 30 | Week 10 Nov 6 | Week 11 Nov 13 | Week 12 Nov 20 | Week 13 Nov 27 | Week 14 Dec 4 | Week 15 (Final) Jan 5 | |
| 1. | USC (60) | USC (1–0) (60) | USC (1–0) (59) | USC (2–0) (60) | USC (3–0) (60) | USC (4–0) (60) | USC (5–0) (57) | USC (6–0) (54) | USC (7–0) (53) | USC (8–0) (56) | USC (9–0) (56) | USC (10–0) (57) | USC (11–0) (49) | USC (11–0) (53) | USC (12–0) (55) | Texas (13–0) (62) | 1. |
| 2. | Texas (2) | Texas (1–0) (2) | Texas (2–0) (3) | Texas (3–0) (2) | Texas (3–0) (1) | Texas (4–0) (1) | Texas (5–0) (4) | Texas (6–0) (7) | Texas (7–0) (8) | Texas (8–0) (5) | Texas (9–0) (6) | Texas (10–0) (7) | Texas (10–0) (13) | Texas (11–0) (9) | Texas (12–0) (7) | USC (12–1) | 2. |
| 3. | Tennessee | Michigan (1–0) | LSU (1–0) | LSU (1–0) | Virginia Tech (4–0) (1) | Virginia Tech (5–0) (1) | Virginia Tech (6–0) (1) | Virginia Tech (6–0) (1) | Virginia Tech (7–0) | Virginia Tech (8–0) (1) | Alabama (9–0) | Miami (FL) (8–1) | LSU (9–1) | LSU (10–1) | Penn State (10–1) | Penn State (11–1) | 3. |
| 4. | Michigan | Tennessee (1–0) | Tennessee (1–0) т | Virginia Tech (3–0) | LSU (1–0) | Georgia (4–0) | Georgia (5–0) | Georgia (6–0) | Georgia (7–0) | Alabama (8–0) | Miami (FL) (7–1) | LSU (8–1) | Penn State (10–1) | Penn State (10–1) | Ohio State (9–2) | Ohio State (10–2) | 4. |
| 5. | Oklahoma | LSU (0–0) | Virginia Tech (2–0) т | Florida (3–0) | Florida (4–0) | Florida State (4–0) | Florida State (5–0) | Alabama (6–0) | Alabama (7–0) | Miami (FL) (6–1) | LSU (7–1) | Penn State (9–1) | Virginia Tech (9–1) | Virginia Tech (10–1) | Oregon (10–1) | LSU (11–2) | 5. |
| 6. | LSU | Virginia Tech (1–0) | Georgia (2–0) | Georgia (3–0) | Georgia (4–0) | Ohio State (3–1) | Miami (FL) (4–1) | Miami (FL) (5–1) | Miami (FL) (5–1) | LSU (6–1) | Penn State (9–1) | Virginia Tech (8–1) | Notre Dame (8–2) | Ohio State (9–2) | Notre Dame (9–2) | West Virginia (11–1) | 6. |
| 7. | Virginia Tech | Ohio State (1–0) | Florida (2–0) | Florida State (3–0) | Florida State (3–0) | Tennessee (3–1) | Alabama (5–0) | LSU (4–1) | LSU (5–1) | UCLA (8–0) | Notre Dame (6–2) | Notre Dame (7–2) | Ohio State (9–2) | Notre Dame (9–2) | Auburn (9–2) | Virginia Tech (11–2) | 7. |
| 8. | Miami (FL) | Iowa (1–0) | Florida State (2–0) | Louisville (2–0) | Ohio State (3–1) | Miami (FL) (3–1) | LSU (3–1) | Texas Tech (6–0) | UCLA (7–0) | Florida State (7–1) | Virginia Tech (8–1) | Alabama (9–1) | Oregon (10–1) | Oregon (10–1) | Georgia (10–2) | Alabama (10–2) | 8. |
| 9. | Ohio State | Georgia (1–0) | Ohio State (1–1) | Ohio State (2–1) | Tennessee (1–1) | California (5–0) | Notre Dame (4–1) | UCLA (6–0) | Florida State (6–1) | Notre Dame (5–2) | Georgia (7–1) | Ohio State (8–2) | Auburn (9–2) | Auburn (9–2) | Miami (FL) (9–2) | TCU (11–1) | 9. |
| 10. | Iowa | Florida (1–0) | Louisville (1–0) | Purdue (2–0) | Miami (FL) (2–1) | Alabama (5–0) | Penn State (6–0) | Florida State (5–1) | Notre Dame (5–2) | Georgia (7–1) | Ohio State (7–2) | Oregon (9–1) | Miami (FL) (8–2) | Miami (FL) (9–2) | LSU (10–2) | Georgia (10–3) | 10. |
| 11. | Florida | Florida State (1–0) | Purdue (1–0) | Tennessee (1–1) | California (4–0) | LSU (2–1) | Texas Tech (5–0) | Boston College (6–1) | Boston College (6–1) | Penn State (8–1) | Oregon (8–1) | UCLA (9–1) | UCLA (9–1) | UCLA (9–1) | West Virginia (10–1) | Notre Dame (9–3) | 11. |
| 12. | Florida State | Louisville (1–0) | Notre Dame (2–0) | Miami (FL) (1–1) | Michigan State (4–0) | Notre Dame (4–1) | UCLA (5–0) | Notre Dame (4–2) | Penn State (7–1) | Ohio State (6–2) | Florida (7–2) | Auburn (8–2) | West Virginia (8–1) | West Virginia (9–1) | Virginia Tech (10–2) | Oregon (10–2) | 12. |
| 13. | Georgia | Purdue (0–0) | Miami (FL) (0–1) | Michigan (2–1) | Texas Tech (3–0) | Texas Tech (4–0) | Florida (5–1) | Ohio State (4–2) | Ohio State (5–2) | Oregon (7–1) | Texas Tech (8–1) | West Virginia (8–1) | Georgia (8–2) | Georgia (9–2) | Alabama (9–2) | UCLA (10–2) | 13. |
| 14. | Louisville | Miami (FL) (0–1) | Michigan (1–1) | California (3–0) | Notre Dame (3–1) | Wisconsin (5–0) | Boston College (5–1) | Penn State (6–1) | Oregon (7–1) | Wisconsin (8–1) | UCLA (8–1) | Georgia (7–2) | Alabama (9–2) | Alabama (9–2) | TCU (10–1) | Auburn (9–3) | 14. |
| 15. | Auburn | Arizona State (1–0) | California (2–0) | Georgia Tech (3–0) | Arizona State (3–1) | Florida (4–1) | Ohio State (3–2) | Auburn (5–1) | Wisconsin (7–1) | Florida (6–2) | West Virginia (7–1) | TCU (10–1) | TCU (10–1) | TCU (10–1) | Texas Tech (9–2) | Wisconsin (10–3) | 15. |
| 16. | Purdue | Oklahoma (0–1) | Boston College (2–0) | Texas Tech (2–0) | Alabama (4–0) | UCLA (4–0) | California (5–1) | Oregon (6–1) | Texas Tech (6–1) | West Virginia (6–1) | Florida State (7–2) | Fresno State (8–1) | Fresno State (8–2) | Texas Tech (9–2) | Louisville (9–2) | Florida (9–3) | 16. |
| 17. | Texas A&M | California (1–0) | Oklahoma (1–1) | Arizona State (2–1) | Wisconsin (4–0) | Boston College (4–1) | Michigan State (4–1) | Wisconsin (6–1) | West Virginia (6–1) | Texas Tech (7–1) | Auburn (7–2) | Michigan (7–3) | Texas Tech (9–2) | Louisville (8–2) | UCLA (9–2) | Boston College (9–3) | 17. |
| 18. | Arizona State | Boston College (1–0) | Georgia Tech (2–0) | Notre Dame (2–1) | Virginia (3–0) | Penn State (5–0) | Tennessee (3–2) | Tennessee (3–2) | Florida (5–2) | Auburn (6–2) | TCU (9–1) | Louisville (7–2) | Louisville (7–2) | Florida (8–3) | Florida (8–3) | Miami (FL) (9–3) | 18. |
| 19. | Boise State | Texas Tech (0–0) | Texas Tech (1–0) | Virginia (2–0) | Minnesota (4–0) | Michigan State (4–1) | Louisville (4–1) | Florida (5–2) | Auburn (5–2) | Boston College (6–2) | Wisconsin (8–2) | Texas Tech (8–2) | Florida (9–3) | Boston College (8–3) | Boston College (8–3) | Texas Tech (9–3) | 19. |
| 20. | California | Virginia (1–0) | Virginia (1–0) | Alabama (3–0) | Purdue (2–1) | Arizona State (3–2) | Auburn (4–1) | West Virginia (6–1) | TCU (7–1) | TCU (8–1) | Fresno State (7–1) | Florida (7–3) | Boston College (8–3) | Wisconsin (9–3) | Wisconsin (9–3) | Louisville (9–3) | 20. |
| 21. | Texas Tech | Georgia Tech (1–0) | Iowa (1–1) | Iowa (2–1) | UCLA (3–0) | Auburn (4–1) | Oregon (5–1) | TCU (6–1) | California (6–2) | California (6–2) | Colorado (7–2) | South Carolina (7–3) | Florida State (7–3) | Michigan (7–4) | Michigan (7–4) | Clemson (8–4) | 21. |
| 22. | Boston College | Alabama (1–0) | Arizona State (1–1) | Michigan State (3–0) | Louisville (2–1) | Louisville (3–1) | Minnesota (5–1) | Michigan State (4–2) | Minnesota (5–2) | Fresno State (6–1) | Michigan (6–3) | Florida State (7–3) | Wisconsin (8–3) | Fresno State (8–3) | Florida State (8–4) | Oklahoma (8–4) | 22. |
| 23. | Virginia | Notre Dame (1–0) | Clemson (2–0) | UCLA (3–0) | Boston College (3–1) | Georgia Tech (3–1) | Wisconsin (5–1) | California (5–2) | Northwestern (5–2) | Michigan (6–3) | Louisville (6–2) | Boston College (7–3) | Michigan (7–4) | Clemson (7–4) | Clemson (7–4) | Florida State (8–5) | 23. |
| 24. | Alabama | Fresno State (0–0) | Alabama (2–0) | Wisconsin (3–0) | Auburn (3–1) | Michigan (3–2) | Colorado (4–1) | Virginia (4–2) | Fresno State (5–1) | Colorado (6–2) | Georgia Tech (6–2) | Wisconsin (8–3) | Georgia Tech (7–3) | Georgia Tech (7–4) | Georgia Tech (7–4) | Nebraska (8–4) | 24. |
| 25. | Pittsburgh | Auburn (0–1) | Fresno State (1–0) | Boston College (2–1) | Georgia Tech (3–1) | Virginia (3–1) | West Virginia (5–1) | Minnesota (5–2) | Tennessee (3–3) | Louisville (5–2) | Boston College (6–3) | UTEP (8–1) | Iowa State (7–3) | Iowa (7–4) | Iowa (7–4) | California (8–4) | 25. |
| | Preseason | Week 1 Sept 6 | Week 2 Sept 11 | Week 3 Sept 18 | Week 4 Sept 25 | Week 5 Oct 2 | Week 6 Oct 9 | Week 7 Oct 16 | Week 8 Oct 23 | Week 9 Oct 30 | Week 10 Nov 6 | Week 11 Nov 13 | Week 12 Nov 20 | Week 13 Nov 27 | Week 14 Dec 4 | Week 15 (Final) Jan 5 | |
| | | Dropped: Texas A&M; Boise State; Pittsburgh | Dropped: Auburn | Dropped: Oklahoma; Clemson; Fresno State | Dropped: Michigan; Iowa | Dropped: Minnesota; Purdue | Dropped: Arizona State; Georgia Tech; Michigan; Virginia | Dropped: Louisville; Colorado | Dropped: Michigan State; Virginia | Dropped: Minnesota; Northwestern; Tennessee | Dropped: California | Dropped: Colorado; Georgia Tech | Dropped: South Carolina; UTEP | Dropped: Iowa State; Florida State | Dropped: Fresno State | Dropped: Michigan; Georgia Tech; Iowa | |

== Harris Interactive Poll ==
The Harris Poll is the newest poll as it was created in 2005 to replace the AP Poll in the BCS formula. It consists of former players, coaches, administrators, and current and former media who submit votes for the top 25 teams each week. The panel has been designed to be a statistically valid representation of all 11 Division I-A Conferences and independent institutions. The poll operates identically to the other polls, except with 114 members. The poll ends at the conclusion of the regular season, and does not produce another poll after the bowl games or crown a champion.

| | Week 4 Sept 25 | Week 5 Oct 2 | Week 6 Oct 9 | Week 7 Oct 16 | Week 8 Oct 23 | Week 9 Oct 30 | Week 10 Nov 6 | Week 11 Nov 13 | Week 12 Nov 20 | Week 13 Nov 27 | Week 14 (Final) Dec 4 | |
| 1. | USC (3–0) (110) | USC (4–0) (108) | USC (5–0) (100) | USC (6–0) (96) | USC (7–0) (95) | USC (8–0) (96) | USC (9–0) (97) | USC (10–0) (94) | USC (11–0) (88) | USC (11–0) (99) | USC (12–0) (99) | 1. |
| 2. | Texas (3–0) (3) | Texas (4–0) (4) | Texas (5–0) (13) | Texas (6–0) (17) | Texas (7–0) (18) | Texas (8–0) (16) | Texas (9–0) (16) | Texas (10–0) (19) | Texas (10–0) (25) | Texas (11–0) (14) | Texas (12–0) (14) | 2. |
| 3. | Virginia Tech (4–0) | Virginia Tech (5–0) | Virginia Tech (6–0) | Virginia Tech (6–0) | Virginia Tech (7–0) | Virginia Tech (8–0) (1) | Miami (FL) (7–1) | Miami (FL) (8–1) | LSU (9–1) | Penn State (10–1) | Penn State (10–1) | 3. |
| 4. | Florida (4–0) | Florida State (4–0) | Georgia (5–0) | Georgia (6–0) | Georgia (7–0) | Alabama (8–0) | Alabama (9–0) | LSU (8–1) | Penn State (10–1) | LSU (10–1) | Ohio State (9–2) | 4. |
| 5. | LSU (1–0) | Georgia (4–0) | Florida State (5–0) | Alabama (6–0) | Alabama (7–0) | Miami (FL) (6–1) | LSU (7–1) | Penn State (9–1) | Notre Dame (8–2) | Virginia Tech (10–1) | Notre Dame (9–2) | 5. |
| 6. | Florida State (3–0) | Ohio State (3–1) | Miami (FL) (4–1) | Miami (FL) (5–1) | Miami (FL) (5–1) | UCLA (8–0) | Penn State (9–1) | Notre Dame (7–2) | Virginia Tech (9–1) | Ohio State (9–2) | Oregon (10–1) | 6. |
| 7. | Georgia (4–0) | Miami (FL) (3–1) | Alabama (5–0) | LSU (4–1) | UCLA (7–0) | LSU (6–1) | Notre Dame (6–2) | Virginia Tech (8–1) | Ohio State (9–2) | Notre Dame (9–2) | Auburn (9–2) | 7. |
| 8. | Ohio State (3–1) | Alabama (5–0) | Notre Dame (4–1) | UCLA (6–0) | LSU (5–1) | Florida State (7–1) | Virginia Tech (8–1) | Alabama (9–1) | Oregon (10–1) | Oregon (10–1) | Georgia (10–2) | 8. |
| 9. | Miami (FL) (2–1) | Tennessee (3–1) | Penn State (6–0) | Texas Tech (6–0) | Florida State (6–1) | Notre Dame (5–2) | Georgia (7–1) | Ohio State (8–2) | Auburn (9–2) | Auburn (9–2) | Miami (FL) (9–2) | 9. |
| 10. | Michigan State (4–0) | California (5–0) | LSU (3–1) | Florida State (5–1) | Notre Dame (5–2) | Penn State (8–1) | Ohio State (7–2) | Oregon (9–1) | Miami (FL) (8–2) | Miami (FL) (9–2) | LSU (10–2) | 10. |
| 11. | California (4–0) | Notre Dame (4–1) | UCLA (5–0) | Notre Dame (4–2) | Penn State (7–1) | Georgia (7–1) | Oregon (8–1) | Auburn (8–2) | UCLA (9–1) | UCLA (9–1) | Virginia Tech (10–2) | 11. |
| 12. | Tennessee (1–1) | LSU (2–1) | Florida (5–1) | Penn State (6–1) | Boston College (6–1) | Ohio State (6–2) | Texas Tech (8–1) | UCLA (9–1) | Georgia (8–2) | Georgia (9–2) | West Virginia (10–1) | 12. |
| 13. | Notre Dame (3–1) | Wisconsin (5–0) | Texas Tech (5–0) | Boston College (6–1) | Ohio State (5–2) | Oregon (7–1) | Florida (7–2) | Georgia (7–2) | West Virginia (8–1) | West Virginia (9–1) | Alabama (9–2) | 13. |
| 14. | Arizona State (3–1) | Florida (4–1) | Boston College (5–1) | Ohio State (4–2) | Oregon (7–1) | Wisconsin (8–1) | UCLA (8–1) | West Virginia (8–1) | Alabama (9–2) | Alabama (9–2) | TCU (10–1) | 14. |
| 15. | Alabama (4–0) | Texas Tech (4–0) | Michigan State (4–1) | Auburn (5–1) | Wisconsin (7–1) | Florida (6–2) | Auburn (7–2) | TCU (10–1) | TCU (10–1) | TCU (10–1) | Texas Tech (9–2) | 15. |
| 16. | Texas Tech (3–0) | UCLA (4–0) | California (5–1) | Oregon (6–1) | Texas Tech (6–1) | Texas Tech (7–1) | Florida State (7–2) | Fresno State (8–1) | Fresno State (8–2) | Texas Tech (9–2) | Louisville (9–2) | 16. |
| 17. | Wisconsin (4–0) | Michigan State (4–1) | Ohio State (3–2) | Wisconsin (6–1) | Florida (5–2) | Auburn (6–2) | West Virginia (7–1) | Michigan (7–3) | Texas Tech (9–2) | Louisville (8–2) | Florida (8–3) т | 17. |
| 18. | UCLA (3–0) | Boston College (4–1) | Auburn (4–1) | Tennessee (3–2) | West Virginia (6–1) | West Virginia (6–1) | TCU (9–1) | Louisville (7–2) | Louisville (7–2) | Florida (8–3) | UCLA (9–2) т | 18. |
| 19. | Virginia (3–0) | Penn State (5–0) | Louisville (4–1) | Florida (5–2) | Auburn (5–2) | TCU (8–1) | Wisconsin (8–2) | Texas Tech (8–2) | Florida (7–3) | Boston College (8–3) | Boston College (8–3) | 19. |
| 20. | Minnesota (4–0) | Arizona State (3–2) | Oregon (5–1) | West Virginia (6–1) | TCU (7–1) | Boston College (6–2) | Fresno State (7–1) | Florida (7–3) | Boston College (8–3) | Wisconsin (9–3) | Wisconsin (9–3) | 20. |
| 21. | Boston College (3–1) | Michigan (3–2) | Tennessee (3–2) | Michigan State (4–2) | California (6–2) | California (6–2) | Michigan (6–3) | Florida State (7–3) | Florida State (7–3) | Michigan (7–4) | Michigan (7–4) | 21. |
| 22. | Purdue (2–1) | Auburn (4–1) | Minnesota (5–1) | TCU (6–1) | Northwestern (5–2) | Michigan (6–3) | Colorado (7–2) | South Carolina (7–3) | Georgia Tech (7–3) | Fresno State (8–3) | Florida State (8–4) | 22. |
| 23. | Iowa State (3–0) | Louisville (3–1) | Wisconsin (5–1) | California (5–2) | Minnesota (5–2) | Fresno State (6–1) | Louisville (6–2) | Boston College (7–3) | Wisconsin (8–3) | Clemson (7–4) | Clemson (7–4) | 23. |
| 24. | Louisville (2–1) | Georgia Tech (3–1) | Colorado (4–1) | Nebraska (5–1) | Fresno State (5–1) | Colorado (6–2) | Georgia Tech (6–2) | Wisconsin (8–3) | Michigan (7–4) | Georgia Tech (7–4) | Georgia Tech (7–4) | 24. |
| 25. | Michigan (2–2) | Nebraska (4–0) | West Virginia (5–1) | Minnesota (5–2) | Tennessee (3–3) | Louisville (5–2) | California (6–3) | Minnesota (7–3) | Iowa State (7–3) | Iowa (7–4) | Iowa (7–4) | 25. |
| | Week 4 Sept 25 | Week 5 Oct 2 | Week 6 Oct 9 | Week 7 Oct 16 | Week 8 Oct 23 | Week 9 Oct 30 | Week 10 Nov 6 | Week 11 Nov 13 | Week 12 Nov 20 | Week 13 Nov 27 | Week 14 (Final) Dec 4 | |
| | | Dropped: Iowa State; Purdue; Minnesota; Virginia | Dropped: Nebraska; Georgia Tech; Michigan; Arizona State | Dropped: Colorado; Louisville | Dropped: Nebraska; Michigan State | Dropped: Tennessee; Minnesota; Northwestern | Dropped: Boston College | Dropped: Colorado; California; Georgia Tech | Dropped: Minnesota; South Carolina | Dropped: Iowa State; Florida State | Dropped: Fresno State | |

== BCS standings ==
The Bowl Championship Series (BCS) determined the two teams that competed in the BCS National Championship Game, the 2006 Rose Bowl.

| | Week 7 Oct 17 | Week 8 Oct 24 | Week 9 Oct 31 | Week 10 Nov 7 | Week 11 Nov 14 | Week 12 Nov 21 | Week 13 Nov 28 | Week 14 (Final) Dec 4 | |
| 1. | USC (6–0) | Texas (7–0) | USC (8–0) | USC (9–0) | USC (10–0) | USC (11–0) | USC (11–0) | USC (12–0) | 1. |
| 2. | Texas (6–0) | USC (7–0) | Texas (8–0) | Texas (9–0) | Texas (10–0) | Texas (10–0) | Texas (11–0) | Texas (12–0) | 2. |
| 3. | Virginia Tech (6–0) | Virginia Tech (7–0) | Virginia Tech (7–0) | Alabama (9–0) | Miami (FL) (8–1) | Penn State (10–1) | Penn State (10–1) | Penn State (10–1) | 3. |
| 4. | Georgia (6–0) | Georgia (7–0) | Alabama (8–0) | Miami (FL) (7–1) | Penn State (9–1) | LSU (9–1) | LSU (10–1) | Ohio State (9–2) | 4. |
| 5. | Alabama (6–0) | Alabama (7–0) | UCLA (8–0) | Penn State (9–1) | LSU (8–1) | Virginia Tech (9–1) | Virginia Tech (10–1) | Oregon (10–1) | 5. |
| 6. | LSU (4–1) | UCLA (7–0) | Miami (FL) (6–1) | Virginia Tech (8–1) | Virginia Tech (8–1) | Ohio State (9–2) | Ohio State (9–2) | Notre Dame (9–2) | 6. |
| 7. | Texas Tech (6–0) | Miami (FL) (5–1) | Penn State (8–1) | LSU (7–1) | Ohio State (8–2) | Oregon (10–1) | Oregon (10–1) | Georgia (10–2) | 7. |
| 8. | Miami (FL) (5–1) | LSU (5–1) | LSU (6–1) | Ohio State (7–2) | Alabama (9–1) | Notre Dame (8–2) | Notre Dame (9–2) | Miami (FL) (9–2) | 8. |
| 9. | UCLA (6–0) | Penn State (7–1) | Florida State (7–1) | Georgia (7–1) | Notre Dame (7–2) | Miami (FL) (8–2) | Miami (FL) (9–2) | Auburn (9–2) | 9. |
| 10. | Penn State (6–1) | Florida State (6–1) | Ohio State (6–2) | Oregon (8–1) | Oregon (9–1) | Auburn (9–2) | Auburn (9–2) | Virginia Tech (10–2) | 10. |
| 11. | Florida State (5–1) | Oregon (7–1) | Georgia (7–1) | Notre Dame (6–2) | UCLA (9–1) | West Virginia (8–1) | West Virginia (9–1) | West Virginia (10–1) | 11. |
| 12. | Boston College (6–1) | Wisconsin (7–1) | Wisconsin (8–1) | Texas Tech (8–1) | West Virginia (8–1) | UCLA (9–1) | UCLA (9–1) | LSU (10–2) | 12. |
| 13. | Oregon (6–1) | Ohio State (5–2) | Oregon (7–1) | Florida (7–2) | Auburn (8–2) | TCU (10–1) | Georgia (9–2) | Alabama (9–2) | 13. |
| 14. | Wisconsin (6–1) | Boston College (6–1) | Notre Dame (5–2) | West Virginia (7–1) | TCU (10–1) | Alabama (9–2) | TCU (10–1) | TCU (10–1) | 14. |
| 15. | Ohio State (4–2) | Notre Dame (5–2) | Texas Tech (7–1) | UCLA (8–1) | Michigan (7–3) | Georgia (8–2) | Alabama (9–2) | Texas Tech (9–2) | 15. |
| 16. | Notre Dame (4–2) | Texas Tech (6–1) | Florida (6–2) | Wisconsin (8–2) | Georgia (7–2) | Texas Tech (9–2) | Texas Tech (9–2) | UCLA (9–2) | 16. |
| 17. | West Virginia (6–1) | West Virginia (6–1) | West Virginia (6–1) | TCU (9–1) | Fresno State (8–1) | Wisconsin (8–3) | Florida (8–3) | Florida (8–3) | 17. |
| 18. | Auburn (5–1) | TCU (7–1) | TCU (8–1) | Colorado (7–2) | Louisville (7–2) | Boston College (8–3) | Wisconsin (9–3) | Wisconsin (9–3) | 18. |
| 19. | Tennessee (3–2) | Florida (5–2) | Boston College (6–2) | Florida State (7–2) | Texas Tech (8–2) | Fresno State (8–2) | Michigan (7–4) | Louisville (9–2) | 19. |
| 20. | Florida (5–2) | Minnesota (5–2) | Auburn (6–2) | Auburn (7–2) | Wisconsin (8–3) | Louisville (7–2) | Boston College (8–3) | Michigan (7–4) | 20. |
| 21. | TCU (6–1) | Northwestern (5–2) | Michigan (6–3) | Michigan (6–3) | Minnesota (7–3) | Georgia Tech (7–3) | Louisville (8–2) | Boston College (8–3) | 21. |
| 22. | Minnesota (5–2) | Auburn (5–2) | Colorado (6–2) | Fresno State (7–1) | Florida (7–3) | Michigan (7–4) | Northwestern (7–4) | Florida State (8–4) | 22. |
| 23. | Nebraska (5–1) | California (6–2) | California (6–2) | Georgia Tech (6–2) | South Carolina (7–3) | Florida (7–3) | Oklahoma (7–4) | Oklahoma (7–4) | 23. |
| 24. | Michigan State (4–2) | Colorado (5–2) | Fresno State (6–1) | Minnesota (6–3) | Boston College (7–3) | Florida State (7–3) | Georgia Tech (7–4) | Georgia Tech (7–4) | 24. |
| 25. | California (5–2) | Michigan (5–3) | Oklahoma (5–3) | Louisville (6–2) | Oklahoma (6–3) | Northwestern (7–4) | Fresno State (8–3) | Northwestern (7–4) | 25. |
| | Week 7 Oct 17 | Week 8 Oct 24 | Week 9 Oct 31 | Week 10 Nov 7 | Week 11 Nov 14 | Week 12 Nov 21 | Week 13 Nov 28 | Week 14 (Final) Dec 4 | |
| | | Dropped: Michigan State; Nebraska; Tennessee | Dropped: Northwestern; Minnesota | Dropped: Oklahoma; California; Boston College | Dropped: Georgia Tech; Florida State; Colorado | Dropped: Oklahoma; South Carolina; Minnesota | Dropped: Florida State | Dropped: Fresno State | |
