= 2005 Nebraska Cornhuskers football team =

American college football season

2005 Nebraska Cornhuskers football

Alamo Bowl champion

Alamo Bowl, W 32–28 vs. Michigan
- Conference: Big 12 Conference
- North Division

Ranking
- Coaches: No. 24
- AP: No. 24
- Record: 8–4 (4–4 Big 12)
- Head coach: Bill Callahan (2nd season)
- Offensive coordinator: Jay Norvell (2nd season)
- Offensive scheme: West Coast
- Defensive coordinator: Kevin Cosgrove (2nd season)
- Base defense: 4–3
- Home stadium: Memorial Stadium

2005 Big 12 Conference football standings
	Conf.			Overall
Team	W		L	W		L
North Division
Colorado x	5	–	3	7	–	6
No. 24 Nebraska	4	–	4	8	–	4
Missouri	4	–	4	7	–	5
Iowa State	4	–	4	7	–	5
Kansas	3	–	5	7	–	5
Kansas State	2	–	6	5	–	6
South Division
No. 1 Texas x$#	8	–	0	13	–	0
No. 20 Texas Tech	6	–	2	9	–	3
No. 22 Oklahoma	6	–	2	8	–	4
Texas A&M	3	–	5	5	–	6
Baylor	2	–	6	5	–	6
Oklahoma State	1	–	7	4	–	7
Championship: Texas 70, Colorado 3
# – BCS National Champion; $ – BCS representative as conference champion; x – Division champion/co-champions; Rankings from AP Poll

The 2005 Nebraska Cornhuskers football team represented the University of Nebraska–Lincoln in the 2005 NCAA Division I-A football season. The team was coached by Bill Callahan and played their home games in Memorial Stadium in Lincoln, Nebraska.

== Before the season ==
Nebraska experienced many changes to their team's roster; not only did key wide receiver Ross Pilkington leave the team after he gave up football, but after the spring game, new junior college transfer Zac Taylor replaced the 2004 starter Joe Dailey at the key position of quarterback. Shortly thereafter Joe Dailey transferred to North Carolina.

== Schedule ==
Date	Time	Opponent	Site	TV	Result	Attendance
September 3	6:10 pm	Maine*	Memorial Stadium; Lincoln, NE	FSN PPV	W 25–7	77,469
September 10	6:10 pm	Wake Forest*	Memorial Stadium; Lincoln, NE	TBS	W 31–3	77,380
September 17	2:30 pm	Pittsburgh*	Memorial Stadium; Lincoln, NE	ABC	W 7–6	77,336
October 1	2:30 pm	No. 23 Iowa State	Memorial Stadium; Lincoln, NE (rivalry)	ABC	W 27–20 ^{2OT}	77,433
October 8	3:00 pm	No. 15 Texas Tech^{†}	Memorial Stadium; Lincoln, NE	TBS	L 31–34	77,580
October 15	6:05 pm	at Baylor	Floyd Casey Stadium; Waco, TX	FSN PPV	W 23–14	40,857
October 22	11:30 am	at Missouri	Faurot Field; Columbia, MO (rivalry)	FSN	L 24–41	60,641
October 29	11:00 am	Oklahoma	Memorial Stadium; Lincoln, NE (rivalry)	ABC	L 24–31	77,438
November 5	12:00 pm	at Kansas	Memorial Stadium; Lawrence, KS (rivalry)		L 15–40	51,750
November 12	1:05 pm	Kansas State	Memorial Stadium; Lincoln, NE (rivalry)		W 27–25	77,761
November 25	2:30 pm	at Colorado	Folsom Field; Boulder, CO (rivalry)	ABC	W 30–3	54,831
December 28	7:00 pm	vs. No. 20 Michigan*	Alamodome; San Antonio, TX (Alamo Bowl)	ESPN	W 32–28	62,016
*Non-conference game; ^{†}Homecoming; Rankings from AP Poll released prior to the game; All times are in Central time

== Roster and coaching staff ==
2005 Nebraska Cornhuskers football team roster
Players
Coaches
Offense

Pos.	#	Name	Class
QB	7	Jordan Adams	So
OL	65	Greg Austin	Jr
WR	23	Chris Brooks	Fr
OL	59	Brett Byford	So
WR	82	Wes Cammack	Fr
OL	62	Andy Christensen (injured)	RFr
QB	15	Beau Davis	So
WR	26	Dan Erickson	So
OL	77	Seppo Evwaraye	Sr
FB	47	Paul Farino	Fr
WR	28	Isaiah Fluellen	Jr
OL	57	Conan Fredinburg	Fr
OL	79	Cornealius Fuamatu-Thomas (injured)	Sr
QB	8	Joe Ganz	RFr
OL	69	Adam Gibson	Jr
IB	34	Cody Glenn	Fr
WR	7	Frantz Hardy	So
TE	35	David Harvey	Fr
OL	73	Jared Helming	Sr
TE	11	Matt Herian (injured)	Sr
TE	86	Sean Hill	So
OL	61	Mike Huff	RFr
IB	32	Brandon Jackson	So
OL	75	Brandon Koch	Sr
FB	36	Thomas Lawson	RFr
WR	9	Mark LeFlore	Sr
OL	74	Newton Lingenfelter	Jr
IB	20	Marlon Lucky	Fr
OL	50	Kurt Mann	Jr
WR	5	Shamus McKoy	Sr
FB	33	Grant Miller	Jr
TE	81	Josh Mueller	So
WR	84	Grant Mulkey	Jr
OL	76	Lydon Murtha	RFr
WR	83	Terrence Nunn	So
FB	45	Will Otto	Jr
OL	78	Brock Pasteur	Jr
OL	54	Chris Patrick	So
WR	17	Todd Peterson	RFr
TE	85	J.B. Phillips	So
OL	68	Jordan Picou	Jr
OL	72	Rodney Picou	Fr
OL	56	Gary Pike	Sr
OL	63	Craig Roark	Fr
IB	4	Cory Ross (C)	Sr
TE	48	Andy Sand	So
WR	14	Matt Schroeder	Sr
TE	88	Clayton Sievers	RFr
OL	70	Matt Slauson	Fr
WR	87	Nate Swift	RFr
QB	13	Zac Taylor	Jr
TE	89	Hunter Teafatiller	Fr
FB	41	Dane Todd	Jr

Defense

Pos.	#	Name	Class
DL	96	Titus Adams	Sr
DE	48	Adam Blankenship	RFr
CB	1	Zackary Bowman	Jr
LB	34	Stewart Bradley	Jr
LB	40	Lance Brandenburgh	So
SS	21	Titus Brothers	So
SS	26	Mycheal Brown	Jr
DL	65	Chris Bryant	Jr
SS	14	Daniel Bullocks (C)	Sr
DE	90	Adam Carriker	Jr
LB	45	Nick Covey	Fr
DL	94	Barry Cryer	Jr
DL	54	Ola Dagunduro	Jr
CB	6	Donald DeFrand	Sr
LB	38	Phillip Dillard	Fr
SS	46	Ben Eisenhart	So
FS	4	Tyler Fisher	Sr
CB	18	Travis Gingery	So
CB	30	Tierre Green	So
CB	2	Cortney Grixby	So
LB	49	Adam Ickes	Sr
CB	35	Chris LeFlore	So
DE	89	Kevin Luhrs	So
LB	13	Corey McKeon	So
LB	58	Dontrell Moore	Jr
DE	44	Jay Moore	Jr
DE	55	Wali Muhammad	Sr
SS	33	Matt O'Hanlon	Fr
LB	52	Mark O'Shea	Fr
DL	95	Matt O'Shea	Sr
LB	15	Steve Octavien (injured)	Jr
DE	98	Zach Potter	Fr
DE	86	Andy Poulosky	So
DE	85	Thomas Rice	So
SS	24	Brandon Rigoni	Jr
CB	19	Joey Robison	Sr
LB	51	Bo Ruud	So
FS	8	Andrew Shanle	Jr
DL	66	Le Kevin Smith	Sr
SS	39	Jeff Souder	Fr
DE	43	Ty Steinkuhler	RFr
FS	16	Mike Stuntz	Sr
DL	77	Ndamukong Suh (injured)	Fr
FS	25	Blake Tiedtke	Sr
DL	99	Barry Turner	Fr
LB	59	Brian Voges	Jr
CB	28	Bryan Wilson	So
LB	53	Tyler Wortman	RFr

Special teams

Pos.	#	Name	Class
PK	93	Jordan Alegria	Fr
LS	52	Bryan Benzel	Fr
PK	29	Jordan Congdon	Fr
PK	27	David Dyches	Jr
P	19	Tyler Kester	So
P	37	Sam Koch	Sr
PK	91	Eric Lueshen	So
LS	55	Nathan McBride	Fr
LS	82	T.J. O'Leary	Fr
LS	9	Jake Peetz	Sr
P	97	Dan Titchener	RFr
PK	98	Jake Wesch	RFr

Head coach

- Bill Callahan
  2nd season
  2nd year at Nebraska
  Alma mater: Benedictine

Coordinators/assistant coaches

- Jay Norvell
  2nd season as OC/QB coach
  2nd year at Nebraska
  Alma mater: Iowa
- Kevin Cosgrove
  2nd season as DC/LB coach
  2nd year at Nebraska
  Alma mater: UW-Oshkosh
- John Blake
  2nd season as DL coach
  2nd year at Nebraska
  Alma mater: Oklahoma
- Bill Busch
  2nd season as ST/S coach
  6th year at Nebraska
  Alma mater: Nebraska Wesleyan
- Scott Downing
  3rd season as TE/ST coach
  6th year at Nebraska
  Alma mater: Sterling
- Phil Elmassian
  1st season as CB coach
  2nd year at Nebraska
  Alma mater: William & Mary
- Ted Gilmore
  1st season as WR coach
  1st year at Nebraska
  Alma mater: Wyoming
- Randy Jordan
  2nd season as RB coach
  2nd year at Nebraska
  Alma mater: North Carolina
- Dennis Wagner
  2nd season as OL coach
  2nd year at Nebraska
  Alma mater: Utah
- Dave Kennedy
  2nd season as S&C coach
  9th year at Nebraska
  Alma mater: Nebraska
- Aaron Stamn
  2nd season as GA coach
  2nd year at Nebraska
  Alma mater: Minnesota Mankato
- Angus McClure
  1st season as GA coach
  1st year at Nebraska
  Alma mater: Sacramento State

Legend

- (C) Team captain
- (S) Suspended
- (I) Ineligible
- Injured
- Redshirt

Roster
Last update: January 16, 2011

=== Depth chart ===
Defense

FS
Blake Tiedtke
Tyler Fisher
⋅

WILL	MIKE	SAM
Bo Ruud	Corey McKeon	Stewart Bradley
Lance Brandenburgh	Phillip Dillard	Adam Ickes
⋅	⋅	⋅

SS
Daniel Bullocks
Andrew Shanle
⋅

CB
Cortney Grixby
Zack Bowman
⋅

DE	DT	DT	DE
Jay Moore	Le Kevin Smith	Titus Adams	Adam Carriker
Wali Muhammad	Ola Dagunduro	Barry Cryer	Ty Steinkuhler
Barry Turner	⋅	⋅	⋅

CB
Zack Bowman
Tierre Green
Chris LeFlore
⋅

Offense

WR
Nate Swift
Frantz Hardy
⋅

LT	LG	C	RG	RT
Cornealius Fuamatu-Thomas (injured)	Greg Austin	Kurt Mann	Brandon Koch	Seppo Evwaraye
Lydon Murtha; Chris Patrick	Jared Helming	Greg Austin	Mike Huff	Matt Slauson
⋅	⋅	⋅	⋅	⋅

TE
J.B. Phillips
Clayton Sievers
⋅

WR
Terrence Nunn
Grant Mulkey
⋅

QB
Zac Taylor
Harrison Beck
⋅

RB
Cory Ross
Marlon Lucky
Cody Glenn
⋅

FB
Dana Todd
Grant Miller
⋅

Special teams
PK Jordan Congdon
P Sam Koch
KR Marlon Lucky
PR Coutney Grixby
Terrence Nunn
LS \

== Game summaries ==
=== Maine ===
Maine at Nebraska [box score]

Team	1	2	3	4	Total
Maine	0	0	0	7	7
• Nebraska	0	9	6	10	25

- Date: September 3
- Location: Memorial Stadium, Lincoln, Nebraska
- Game start: 6:10 p.m. CST
- Game attendance: 77,469
- TV announcers (PPV): Greg Sharpe (Play-by-play), J. C. Pearson (Color), & Kent Pevelka (Sideline)

Speculation that the 2005 season could perhaps be worse than the 2004 season began when Nebraska struggled to defeat the severe underdog Maine team 25–7.

=== Wake Forest ===
Wake Forest at Nebraska [box score]

Team	1	2	3	4	Total
Wake Forest	0	3	0	0	3
• Nebraska	14	0	10	7	31

- Date: September 10
- Location: Memorial Stadium, Lincoln, Nebraska
- Game start: 6:10 p.m. CST
- Game attendance: 77,380
- TV announcers (TBS): Ron Thulin (Play-by-play), Charles Davis (Color), & Craig Sager (Sideline)

The team went on to crush the Wake Forest Demon Deacons (Zac Taylor's former four year college) 31–3. The win was unusual in that Nebraska's defense scored more points than either team's offense (Nebraska's defense scored 18 points, their offense 6, their special teams 7).

=== Pittsburgh ===
Pittsburgh at Nebraska [box score]

Team	1	2	3	4	Total
Pittsburgh	0	0	6	0	6
• Nebraska	0	7	0	0	7

- Date: September 17
- Location: Memorial Stadium, Lincoln, Nebraska
- Game start: 2:30 p.m. CST
- Game attendance: 77,336
- TV announcers (ABC): Brent Musburger (Play-by-play), Gary Danielson (Color), & Jack Arute (Sideline)

Their next game is arguably one of the most climactic in the history of all of football. The score was Nebraska 7 and the Pittsburgh Panthers 6. With 7 seconds remaining, the Panthers were going to attempt a game-winning field goal from 36 yards. The ball was snapped with the holder unprepared for the play. The ball rebounded off the holder's helmet. Pittsburgh's kicker recovered the ball and threw it incomplete to preserve time. One second remained on the clock as Pittsburgh prepared for the final play. Pittsburgh attempted the kick again, the holder prepared this time. Pittsburgh's kicker looked as though he would have made the field goal had it not been blocked by Nebraska's Adam Ickes.

=== Iowa State ===
Iowa State at Nebraska [box score]

Team	1	2	3	4	OT	Total
Iowa State	0	3	10	0	7	20
• Nebraska	3	0	7	3	14	27

- Date: October 1
- Location: Memorial Stadium, Lincoln, Nebraska
- Game start: 2:30 p.m. CST
- Game attendance: 77,433
- TV announcers (ABC): Dr. Jerry Punch (Play-by-play), Terry Bowden (Color), & Trenni Kusnierek (Sideline)

Nebraska's next game was equally exciting as unranked and undefeated Nebraska took on the #23 Iowa State Cyclones. They won in a hard fought match that went into 2 overtimes by a score of 27–20. The game marked the first time that overtime had occurred in Memorial Stadium. Regardless of the quality win, Nebraska remained unranked.

=== Texas Tech ===
Texas Tech at Nebraska [box score]

Team	1	2	3	4	Total
• Texas Tech	7	14	6	7	34
Nebraska	0	14	7	10	31

- Date: October 8
- Location: Memorial Stadium, Lincoln, Nebraska
- Game start: 3:00 p.m. CST
- Game attendance: 77,580
- TV announcers (TBS): Bob Neal (Play-by-play), Tom Ramsey (Color), & Kip Lewis (Sideline)

Nebraska was the only team that was unranked and had no losses going into their next game against the 15th ranked Texas Tech Red Raiders. After trailing 21–0 in the first half, Nebraska fought back and eventually gained a 31–27 foothold over Texas Tech. In the final minutes of the game, Nebraska seemingly sealed their victory and a top 25 ranking when lineman LeKevin Smith intercepted a Texas Tech pass only to fumble it seconds later to return possession to Texas Tech. The Red Raiders were given a second-chance and with time winding down threw the game-winning touchdown pass to defeat Nebraska.

=== Baylor ===
Nebraska at Baylor [box score]

Team	1	2	3	4	Total
• Nebraska	3	10	7	3	23
Baylor	7	0	7	0	14

- Date: October 15
- Location: Floyd Casey Stadium, Waco, Texas
- Game start: 6:05 p.m. CST
- Game attendance: 40,857
- TV announcers (PPV): Dan McLaughlin (Play-by-play), Gary Reasons (Color), & Greg Sharpe (Sideline)

=== Missouri ===
Nebraska at Missouri [box score]

Team	1	2	3	4	Total
Nebraska	10	14	0	0	24
• Missouri	21	3	7	10	41

- Date: October 22
- Location: Faurot Field, Columbia, Missouri
- Game start: 11:30 a.m. CST
- Game attendance: 60,641
- TV announcers (FSN): Bill Land (Play-by-play), Dave Lapham (Color), & John Rhadigan (Sideline)

=== Oklahoma ===
Oklahoma at Nebraska [box score]

Team	1	2	3	4	Total
• Oklahoma	7	14	3	7	31
Nebraska	0	3	7	14	24

- Date: October 29
- Location: Memorial Stadium, Lincoln, Nebraska
- Game start: 11:00 a.m. CST
- Game attendance: 77,438
- TV announcers (ABC): Gary Thorne (Play-by-play), Ed Cunningham (Color), & Mark Morgan (Sideline)

=== Kansas ===
Nebraska at Kansas [box score]

Team	1	2	3	4	Total
Nebraska	2	7	6	0	15
• Kansas	14	3	7	16	40

- Date: November 5
- Location: Memorial Stadium, Lawrence, Kansas
- Game start: 12:00 p.m. CST
- Game attendance: 51,750

The Huskers lost 3 of their next 4 games, including losses to their rival Missouri Tigers, who defeated them 41–24, a crushing 40–15 defeat to the Kansas Jayhawks (which snapped a 36-year winning streak over Kansas), and rival Oklahoma Sooners, the latter being lost in the final minutes of the game. (This victory was vacated by an NCAA disciplinary panel in July 2007 and then conversely overruled in February 2008.) The only win in this slump was a victory over a sub-par Baylor team.

=== Kansas State ===
Kansas State at Nebraska [box score]

Team	1	2	3	4	Total
Kansas State	6	6	10	3	25
• Nebraska	7	10	7	3	27

- Date: November 12
- Location: Memorial Stadium, Lincoln, Nebraska
- Game start: 1:05 p.m. CST
- Game attendance: 77,761

In a particularly windy game against Kansas State, Nebraska trailed 25–24 with 4:18 remaining in the game. Zac Taylor was on the receiving end of a hard hit that landed him with a mild concussion, removing him from the game. Zac remained on the ground for a couple of minutes with Callahan and KSU's Bill Snyder towering over him. The sold out crowd began to chant his name, as Taylor tried to recompose himself. Backup quarterback, freshman Harrison Beck, burned his redshirt in order to record his first action in a college football game. After throwing an interception in his first drive, he threw a key reception in Nebraska's final drive. Freshman kicker Jordan Congdon came in to make the go-ahead field goal. This was a risky move as the wind was swirling and was so strong that it ripped the stadium's mammoth U.S. flag off a crane that was suspending it, seemingly as a testament to its power. Regardless, Congdon made the 40-yard field goal to give Nebraska the win.

=== Colorado ===
Nebraska at Colorado [box score]

Team	1	2	3	4	Total
• Nebraska	3	17	7	3	30
Colorado	3	0	0	0	3

- Date: November 25
- Location: Folsom Field, Boulder, Colorado
- Game start: 2:30 p.m. CST
- Game attendance: 54,831
- TV announcers (ABC): Mike Tirico (Play-by-play), Tim Brant (Color), & Suzy Shuster (Sideline)

Nebraska's final regular season game of 2005 was at Colorado. Colorado, who was leading the Big 12 North division in the race to the Big 12 championship game, was the heavy favorite, as Nebraska was cold after 3 straight losses followed by a near miss against a struggling Kansas State team. Tension built up between the rivals as a verbal skirmish involving every player erupted in the center of the field between the two teams when Nebraska mistook Colorado players walking toward their half of the field as an insult. Colorado was stunned, however, when Nebraska dominated Colorado in every aspect of the game. Wearing motivational T-shirts reading "RESTORE THE ORDER" underneath their jerseys, Nebraska beat Colorado 30–3 with breakout performances from nearly every player, particularly Zac Taylor and Colorado native Cory Ross.

=== Alamo Bowl vs Michigan ===
Nebraska vs Michigan [box score]

Team	1	2	3	4	Total
Michigan	7	7	7	7	28
• Nebraska	7	7	3	15	32

- Date: December 28
- Location: Alamodome, San Antonio, Texas
- Game start: 7:00 p.m. CST
- Game attendance: 62,016
- TV announcers (ESPN): Mike Tirico (Play-by-play), Kirk Herbstreit (Color), & Erin Andrews (Sideline)

The team finished with 7 wins and 4 losses in the regular season. Nebraska would play their bowl game against the Michigan Wolverines in the 2005 Alamo Bowl in San Antonio, Texas. With 2 seconds left in the game the Wolverines trailed the Cornhuskers 32–28 and set up the hook & lateral play for a miracle touchdown. In one of the wildest finishes ever, Michigan lateraled the football 9 times, fumbling once on their way to a 59-yard gain. In the midst of all this the entire Nebraska sideline stormed the field in celebration thinking the game was over when Michigan fumbled the ball (from their point of view they could not see that the ball was loose and assumed the Michigan player to be down). Many players thinking the play was over stopped playing entirely. This allowed the Michigan ball carrier to run by them, In all the confusion some Michigan players did not block for their carrier. Before the play was over the Cornhuskers, several Michigan players and coaches, and several other individuals along with the awards podium were on the field, and the game officials had left to submit their votes for the award winners. The Michigan ball carrier had been pushed out of bounds inside of the red zone. No penalties were awarded to either team because the officials had already left. When all was said and done, Nebraska came off with a victory and ended their season with an 8–4 record.

== Rankings ==
Ranking movements Legend: ██ Increase in ranking ██ Decrease in ranking — = Not ranked
	Week															
Poll	Pre	1	2	3	4	5	6	7	8	9	10	11	12	13	14	Final
AP	—	—	—	—	—	—	—	—	—	—	—	—	—	—	—	24
Coaches	—	—	—	—	—	—	—	—	—	—	—	—	—	—	—	24
Harris	Not released				—	—	25	—	24	—	—	—	—	—	—	Not released
BCS	Not released							23	—	—	—	—	—	—	—	Not released

== After the season ==
After the acrimonious firing of Frank Solich in 2003 for what Nebraska Athletic Director Steve Pederson perceived as a failure to recruit top players, Nebraska hired Callahan, who promptly introduced the West Coast offense, a marked shift from Nebraska's traditional I-formation option attack. The offense took time to register with the players as the Huskers struggled to adapt, posting a 5–6 season in 2004, Nebraska's first losing season in over 40 years. However, in 2005 the Huskers started fast, going 4–0 to start the season before being defeated at home by Texas Tech 34–31. After a rebound win over a weak Baylor squad, the next few games were some that Huskers fans would want to forget: a 41–24 loss away to Missouri, a home loss to Oklahoma, and a crushing road defeat at Kansas, which had not defeated Nebraska since 1968. However, the season ended on a higher note, as the Huskers dominated the Colorado 30–3 in Boulder.

=== Awards ===
Award	Name(s)
Freshman All American 1st team	Jordan Congdon, Barry Turner
All-Big 12 1st team	Adam Carriker, Sam Koch, Terrence Nunn
All-Big 12 2nd team	Daniel Bullocks, Jordan Congdon, Kurt Mann, Corey McKeon, Cory Ross
All-Big 12 honorable mention	Titus Adams, Seppo Evwaraye, Cortney Grixby, Brandon Koch, Jay Moore, Bo Ruud, Nate Swift
Freshman All-Big 12 1st team	Jordan Congdon, Nate Swift, Barry Turner

=== NFL and pro players ===
The following Nebraska players who participated in the 2005 season later moved on to the next level and joined a professional or semi-pro team as draftees or free agents.

Name	Team
Titus Adams	New York Jets
Stewart Bradley	Philadelphia Eagles
Daniel Bullocks	Detroit Lions
Adam Carriker	St. Louis Rams
Seppo Evwaraye	Carolina Panthers
Joe Ganz	Washington Redskins
Cortney Grixby	Carolina Panthers
Brandon Jackson	Green Bay Packers
Sam Koch	Baltimore Ravens
Jay Moore	San Francisco 49ers
Lydon Murtha	Detroit Lions
Terrence Nunn	New England Patriots
Chris Patrick	New York Giants
Todd Peterson	Jacksonville Jaguars
Andy Poulosky	Sioux City Bandits
Cory Ross	Baltimore Ravens
Bo Ruud	New England Patriots
Andrew Shanle	Chicago Bears
Le Kevin Smith	New England Patriots
Ty Steinkuhler	New York Jets
Nate Swift	Denver Broncos
Zac Taylor	Tampa Bay Buccaneers
