= 2005 Colorado Buffaloes football team =

American college football season

2005 Colorado Buffaloes football

Big 12 North Division champion

Big 12 Championship Game, L 3–70 vs. Texas

Champs Sports Bowl, L 10–19 vs. Clemson
- Conference: Big 12 Conference
- North
- Record: 7–6 (5–3 Big 12)
- Head coach: Gary Barnett (6th season; regular season); Mike Hankwitz (interim; bowl game)
- Offensive coordinator: Shawn Watson (5th season)
- Offensive scheme: Multiple
- Defensive coordinator: Mike Hankwitz (9th season)
- Base defense: Multiple 4–3
- Home stadium: Folsom Field

2005 Big 12 Conference football standings
| | Conf. | | | Overall |
| Team | W | | L | W | | L |
|---|---|---|---|---|---|---|
North Division
| Colorado x | 5 | – | 3 | 7 | – | 6 |
| No. 24 Nebraska | 4 | – | 4 | 8 | – | 4 |
| Missouri | 4 | – | 4 | 7 | – | 5 |
| Iowa State | 4 | – | 4 | 7 | – | 5 |
| Kansas | 3 | – | 5 | 7 | – | 5 |
| Kansas State | 2 | – | 6 | 5 | – | 6 |
South Division
| No. 1 Texas x$# | 8 | – | 0 | 13 | – | 0 |
| No. 20 Texas Tech | 6 | – | 2 | 9 | – | 3 |
| No. 22 Oklahoma | 6 | – | 2 | 8 | – | 4 |
| Texas A&M | 3 | – | 5 | 5 | – | 6 |
| Baylor | 2 | – | 6 | 5 | – | 6 |
| Oklahoma State | 1 | – | 7 | 4 | – | 7 |
Championship: Texas 70, Colorado 3
# – BCS National Champion; $ – BCS representative as conference champion; x – Division champion/co-champions; Rankings from AP Poll

The 2005 Colorado Buffaloes football team represented the University of Colorado at Boulder in the 2005 NCAA Division I-A football season. The previous year's team won the Big 12 North Conference. That marked the third Big 12 North championship for the Buffaloes in four years. The team had expectations to improve on their winning and appeared to be on the right track with a 7–2 record to begin the season. But in the end, head coach Gary Barnett had his contract bought out and Colorado suffered four straight losses including an embarrassing 70–3 loss to Texas in the Big 12 Championship Game. They finished the season 7–6. In the 2005 Champs Sports Bowl against Clemson, Mike Hankwitz acted as interim head coach, even though Dan Hawkins had been hired as the new head coach. Hawkins coached his final game with Boise State in the MPC Computers Bowl game the day after Colorado played. This was the last Colorado team to finish the season with a winning record until 2016.

== Preseason ==
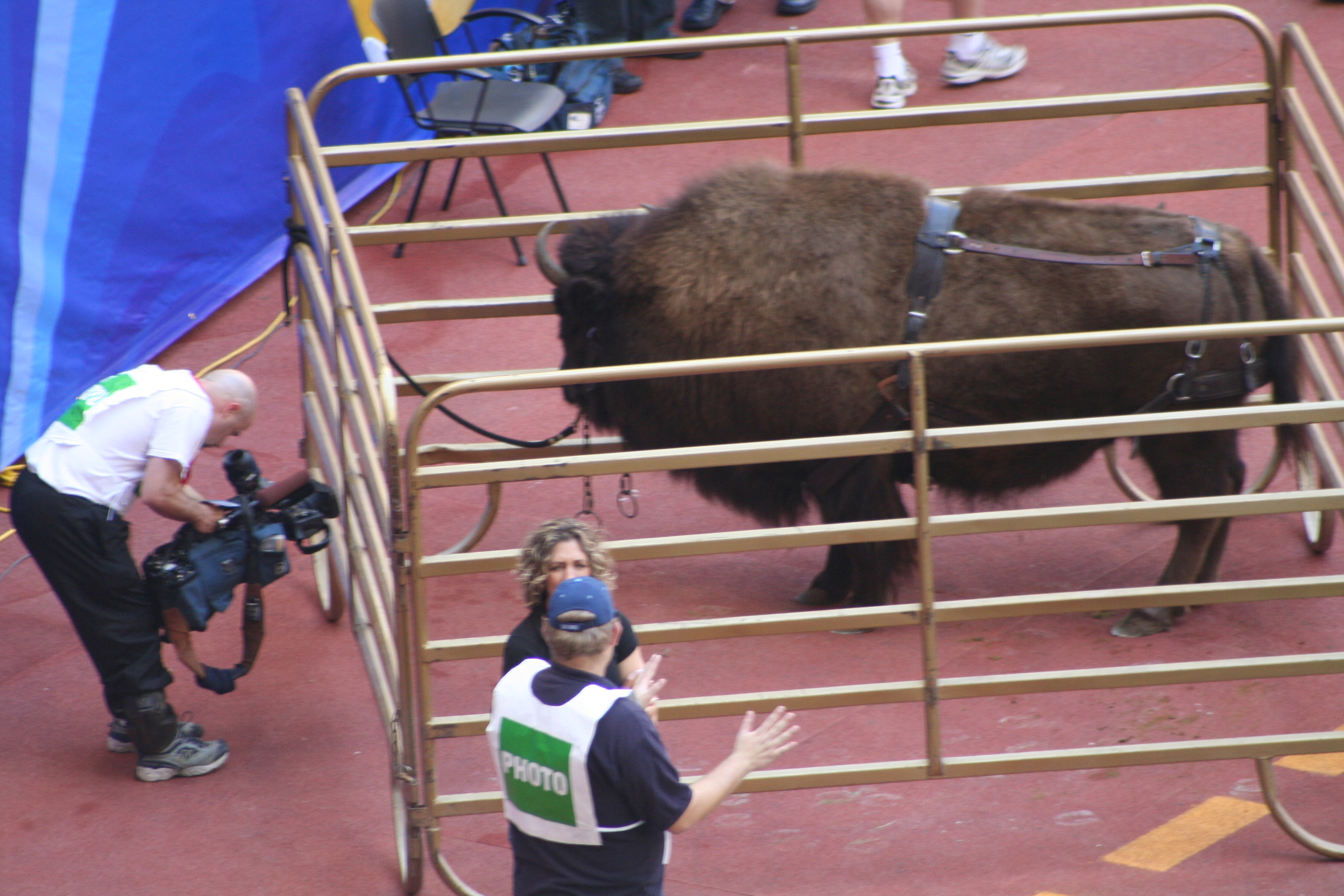
Ralphie at the 2005 Big 12 Championship Game

Colorado had plenty of returning players (they graduated only 11 seniors, returned 50 letterman and 17 starters) and were ranked in the Top 25 in 4 pre-season polls. They were also picked to win the Big 12 North in 9 rankings.

QB Joel Klatt had a solid lock on his starting position. But there was uncertainty of who would be the starting RB, through TB Lawrence Vickers had the inside chance and main competition from Hugh Charles. The shining part of the team was Special Teams, with kicker Mason Crosby and punter John Torp. Other notable returners on offense were tight ends Joe Klopfenstein and Quinn Sypniewski, wide receiver Evan Judge, and most of the offensive line: Brian Daniels, Jr.; Mark Fenton, Clint O'Neal and Gary Moore.

Defense was also solid with few key losses and most returning: (line) James Garee, Alex Ligon, Vaka Manupuna; (linebackers) Thaddaeus Washington, Jordon Dizon, Akarika Dawn, Brian Iwuh; (backs) Terrence Wheatley, Lorenzo Sims, Tyrone Henderson, Dominique Brooks.

=== Preseason awards ===
- PK Mason Crosby (All American, Lou Groza Award)
- P John Torp (Ray Guy Award)
- DE Tom Hubbard (Ronnie Lott Trophy)
- C Mark Fenton (Dave Rimington Award)

== Season summary ==
Although Colorado won the Big 12 North, they back-doored their way in because they lost their two final conference games and needed Iowa State to lose their final game in order to win. Iowa State missed a field goal in OT and thus, Colorado won the Big 12 Conference North Division Title. In the Big 12 Conference Title game, Joel Klatt suffered a concussion and was taken to a hospital. His career at Colorado was then over, as he sat out the bowl game. The key game of the season was Colorado's game against Iowa State. Colorado was leading the game into the fourth quarter, but gave up two touchdowns late in the game to go on and lose. It seemed their spirit was broken as they never pulled it together after that and were never really in any game they played afterwards.

They also ended up setting the school records for most penalties in a season with 123 (since 1996) and most penalty yards in a season with 1084 yards. They were the most penalized team in NCAA Division I-A and 116th (of 117 teams) in penalty yards per game with 83.38 (Texas Tech was 117th with 83.42). They had 35 flags thrown in the last four games of the season which helped with their downfall. Penalties often came at bad times to stop a drive or assist an opponent's drive just when they needed it.

== Schedule ==
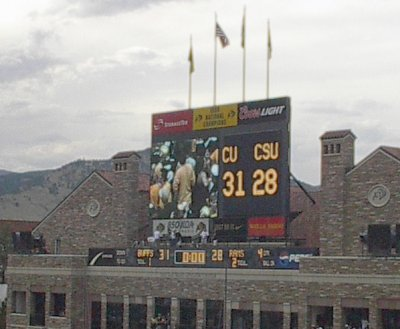
Scoreboard at Folsom Field showing the final score of the Rocky Mountain Showdown.

| Date | Time | Opponent | Rank | Site | TV | Result | Attendance |
|---|---|---|---|---|---|---|---|
| September 3 | 1:30 pm | Colorado State* | | Folsom Field; Boulder, CO (Rocky Mountain Showdown) | TBS | W 31–28 | 54,972 |
| September 10 | 8:00 pm | New Mexico State* | | Folsom Field; Boulder, CO | FSN | W 39–0 | 44,742 |
| September 24 | 10:00 am | at No. 12 Miami (FL)* | | Miami Orange Bowl; Miami, FL | ABC | L 3–23 | 51,229 |
| October 1 | 12:00 pm | at Oklahoma State | | Boone Pickens Stadium; Stillwater, OK | | W 34–0 | 47,908 |
| October 8 | 5:00 pm | Texas A&M^{†} | | Folsom Field; Boulder, CO | FSN | W 41–20 | 50,686 |
| October 15 | 1:30 pm | at No. 2 Texas | No. 24 | Darrell K Royal–Texas Memorial Stadium; Austin, TX | ABC | L 17–42 | 83,474 |
| October 22 | 5:00 pm | Kansas | | Folsom Field; Boulder, CO | FSN | W 44–13 | 48,025 |
| October 29 | 1:10 pm | at Kansas State | | KSU Stadium; Manhattan, KS (rivalry) | | W 23–20 | 43,890 |
| November 5 | 1:30 pm | Missouri | No. 25 | Folsom Field; Boulder, CO | ABC | W 41–12 | 49,196 |
| November 12 | 5:00 pm | at Iowa State | No. 22 | Jack Trice Stadium; Ames, IA | FSN | L 16–30 | 49,242 |
| November 25 | 1:30 pm | Nebraska | | Folsom Field; Boulder, CO (rivalry) | ABC | L 3–30 | 54,841 |
| December 3 | 11:00 am | vs. No. 2 Texas | | Reliant Stadium; Houston, TX (Big 12 Championship Game) | ABC | L 3–70 | 71,107 |
| December 27 | 3:00 pm | vs. No. 23 Clemson* | | Citrus Bowl; Orlando, FL (Champs Sports Bowl) | ESPN | L 10–19 | 31,470 |
*Non-conference game; ^{†}Homecoming; Rankings from AP Poll released prior to the game; All times are in Mountain time

== Roster ==
S=Scholarship; WO=Walk-On; #/#—clock as of 2005 season, i.e., 3/2: three years available to play two in eligibility. #L=indicates number of letters earned through 2004; HS=high school; JC=junior college transfer; RS=freshman redshirt in 2004; TR=transfer; VR=varsity reserve performer.

| No. | Player | Pos. | Ht. | Wt. | Class | Exp | Hometown (High school/Previous college) | Status | |
|---|---|---|---|---|---|---|---|---|---|
| 55 | ACKERMANN, Jason | ILB | 6-1 | 220 | Jr. | 1L | Louisville, Colorado (Boulder Fairview) | S | 2/2 |
| 81 | ADAMS, Justin | TE | 6-1 | 225 | Fr. | RS | Denver (Montbello) | WO | 4/4 |
| 21 | ANDERSON, A.J | CB | 5-11 | 180 | Sr. | VR | Omaha, Neb. (Central) | WO | 1/1 |
| 60 | BACKOWSKI, Paul | OL | 6-6 | 265 | Fr. | HS | Foley, Minn. (Foley) | S | 5/4 |
| 5 | BARNETT, Alvin | WR | 6-0 | 190 | So. | JC | Tulsa, Okla. (East Central/NE Oklahoma A&M) | S | 4/3 |
| 47 | BARRETT, Alonzo | DE | 6-3 | 240 | So. | 1L | Alabaster, Ala. (Thompson) | S | 4/3 |
| 35 | BEHRENS, Jake | FB | 5-11 | 230 | Fr. | HS | Omaha, Neb. (Millard North) | S | 5/4 |
| 5 | BILLINGSLEY, J.J. | S | 5-11 | 185 | Jr. | 2L | Aurora, Colo. (Eaglecrest) | S | 2/2 |
| 33 | BOYE-DOE, Walter | DE | 6-2 | 240 | Jr. | 2L | Keller, Texas (Keller) | S | 3/2 |
| 18 | BROOKS, Dominique | S | 6-1 | 200 | Jr. | 2L | Mesquite, Texas (North Mesquite) | S | 3/2 |
| 12 | BROWN, Mack | QB | 6-3 | 205 | Fr. | HS | Overland Park, Kansas (Shawnee Mission North) | S | 5/4 |
| 34 | BROWN, R.J | ILB | 6-1 | 225 | Fr. | RS | Honolulu, Hawai’i (Punahou) | WO | 4/4 |
| 31 | BURL, Gerett | CB | 5-10 | 160 | Jr. | 1L | Libertyville, Ill. (Libertyville/Garden City CC) | S | 3/2 |
| 42 | BURNEY, Ben | S | 5-11 | 190 | Fr. | HS | Lone Tree, Colorado (Mullen) | S | 5/4 |
| 54 | BURTON, Marcus | ILB | 6-0 | 230 | Fr. | HS | Channelview, Texas (Channelview) | S | 5/4 |
| 21 | CAESAR, Brandon | TB | 6-0 | 210 | Jr. | VR | Broussard, Quebec (Old Farms Prep, Avon, Conn.) | S | 2/2 |
| 32 | CANTRELL, Maurice | ILB | 6-0 | 235 | Fr. | RS | Cedar Rapids, Iowa (Washington) | S | 4/4 |
| 19 | CARPENTER, Ben | OLB | 6-3 | 225 | Jr. | VR | Des Moines, Iowa (Dowling) | WO | 2/2 |
| 2 | CHARLES, Hugh | TB | 5-8 | 185 | So. | 1L | Southlake, Texas (Keller) | S | 4/3 |
| 95 | CLEMENT, Nick | DT | 6-2 | 260 | Sr. | VR | Colorado Springs, Colorado (Cheyenne Mountain) | WO | 1/1 |
| 10 | COX, James | QB | 6-3 | 210 | Jr. | 1L | Simi Valley, California (Royal) | S | 2/2 |
| 16 | CRAWFORD, Cody | WR | 5-11 | 165 | Fr. | RS | San Diego(Torrey Pines) | WO | 4/4 |
| 30 | CREIGHTON, Paul | FB | 6-5 | 250 | Jr. | 2L | Niwot, Colo. (Niwot) | S | 2/2 |
| 16 | CROSBY, Mason | PK | 6-2 | 210 | Jr. | 2L | Georgetown, Texas (Georgetown) | S | 3/2 |
| 37 | CUSWORTH, Chad | OLB | 5-11 | 210 | Jr. | VR | Highlands Ranch, Colorado (Thunder Ridge) | WO | 2/2 |
| 66 | DANIELS, Brian | OL | 6-4 | 300 | Jr. | 2L | Evergreen, Colorado (Mullen) | S | 3/2 |
| 12 | DAWN, Akarika | ILB | 6-2 | 240 | Sr. | 3L | Sugarland, Texas (Kempner) | S | 2/1 |
| 8 | DEVENNY, Patrick | QB | 6-3 | 220 | Fr. | HS | Roseville, California (Granite Bay) | S | 5/4 |
| 14 | DiLALLO, Matthew | P | 6-1 | 195 | Fr. | HS | Wellington, Florida (Wellington) | S | 5/4 |
| 44 | DIZON, Jordon | ILB | 6-0 | 215 | So. | 1L | Kauai, Hawai’i (Waimea) | S | 4/3 |
| 39 | EBERHART, Kevin | PK | 5-10 | 185 | So. | 1L | Broomfield, Colorado (Broomfield) | S | 3/3 |
| 22 | ELLIS, Byron | TB | 6-0 | 200 | So. | 1L | Culver City, California (Venice) | S | 4/3 |
| 32 | ENGLISH, Brandon | TE | 6-4 | 240 | Jr. | JC | Leawood, Kansas (Blue Valley North/Fort Scott CC) | WO | 2/2 |
| 58 | FENTON, Mark | C | 6-4 | 295 | Jr. | 2L | Inglewood, California (Westchester) | S | 2/2 |
| 8 | FOSTER, Reggie | S | 5-11 | 195 | Fr. | HS | Long Beach, California (Millikan) | S | 5/4 |
| 18 | GARDEN, Isaac | PK | 6-0 | 175 | So. | VR | Encino, California (Taft) | WO | 3/3 |
| 82 | GAREE, James | DT | 6-6 | 275 | Sr. | 3L | Colorado Springs, Colorado (Mitchell) | S | 1/1 |
| 87 | GEER, Riar | TE | 6-3 | 235 | Fr. | HS | Grand Junction, Colorado (Fruita Monument) | S | 5/4 |
| 46 | GOETTSCH, Dan | TE | 6-5 | 240 | Jr. | VR | Austin, Minn. (Austin) | WO | 2/2 |
| 47 | GONZALES, Marcus | WR | 6-4 | 210 | Sr. | VR | Orchard Mesa, Colorado (Grand Junction Central/Scottsdale CC) | WO | 1/1 |
| 28 | GRIFFITH, Kyle | ILB | 6-2 | 205 | Sr. | 3L | Broomfield, Colorado (Broomfield) | S | 2/1 |
| 62 | GUYDON, John | DT | 6-2 | 285 | Sr. | 1L | Yorba Linda, California (El Dorado/Fullerton CC) | S | 1/1 |
| 90 | HAMMOND, Matt | SN | 6-3 | 215 | Sr. | 1L | Sherwood, Oregon (Jesuit) | WO | 1/1 |
| 25 | HARRIS, Lionel | S | 6-0 | 195 | So. | VR | Manvel, Texas (Alvin) | S | 3/3 |
| 76 | HARRISON, Edwin | OL | 6-4 | 305 | So. | 1L | Houston, Texas (Westbury) | S | 3/3 |
| 68 | HAUCK, Jeremy | OL | 6-4 | 270 | Fr. | HS | Niwot, Colorado (Niwot) | S | 5/4 |
| 72 | HEAD, Devin | OL | 6-4 | 275 | Fr. | HS | Corona, California (Centennial) | S | 5/4 |
| 3 | HENDERSON, Tyrone | S | 5-10 | 175 | Jr. | 1L | Oakland, California (McClymonds) | S | 2/2 |
| 50 | HOLLIS, Chris | ILB | 6-1 | 230 | Jr. | 2L | Denver (Aurora Hinkley) | S | 2/2 |
| 85 | HOLZ, Nick | WR | 5-11 | 180 | Jr. | 1L | Danville, California (De La Salle) | WO | 2/2 |
| 9 | HUBBARD, Tom | S | 6-5 | 220 | Sr. | 1L | Limon, Colorado (Limon) | S | 1/1 |
| 86 | HYPOLITE, George | DL | 6-1 | 270 | Fr. | HS | Los Angeles(Loyola) | S | 5/4 |
| 27 | IWUH, Brian | OLB | 6-0 | 225 | Sr. | 3L | Houston, Texas (Worthing) | S | 2/1 |
| 7 | JACKSON, Bernard | QB | 6-0 | 190 | So. | VR | Corona, California (Santiago) | S | 3/3 |
| 40 | JONES, Brad | OLB | 6-4 | 220 | Fr. | RS | East Lansing, Mich. (East Lansing) | S | 4/4 |
| 96 | JONES, Marcus | DT | 6-4 | 300 | Jr. | VR | Klein, Texas (Klein) | S | 2/2 |
| 88 | JONES, Zach | DE | 6-3 | 250 | Fr. | HS | Aurora, Colorado (Grandview) | S | 5/4 |
| 6 | JOSEPH, Reggie | WR | 6-0 | 185 | So. | 1L | La Place, La. (East St. John) | S | 4/3 |
| 82 | JUDGE, Evan | WR | 6-2 | 215 | Sr. | 3L | Scottsdale, Arizona (Chaparral) | S | 1/1 |
| 97 | KAYNOR, Taj | DE | 6-5 | 260 | Fr. | HS | Englewood, Colorado (Cherry Creek) | S | 5/4 |
| 14 | KLATT, Joel | QB | 6-1 | 210 | Sr. | 3L | Arvada, Colorado (Pomona) | S | 2/1 |
| 89 | KLOPFENSTEIN, Joe | TE | 6-6 | 245 | Sr. | 3L | Aurora, Colorado (Grandview) | S | 2/1 |
| 51 | LIGON, Alex | DE | 6-3 | 250 | Jr. | 2L | Torrance, California (North Torrance) | S | 2/2 |
| 91 | LUCAS, Maurice | DE | 6-5 | 235 | Fr. | HS | Denver (Rangeview) | S | 5/4 |
| 9 | MACKEY, Blake | WR | 6-3 | 200 | Jr. | 1L | Bakersfield, California (Bakersfield) | S | 2/2 |
| 57 | MacMARTIN, Bryce | C | 6-2 | 290 | Jr. | JC | San Francisco (Lowell/City College of San Francisco) | S | 3/2 |
| 93 | MANUPUNA, Vaka | DT | 6-1 | 290 | Sr. | 3L | Kihei, Hawai’i (St. Louis) | S | 1/1 |
| 38 | McBRIDE, Chase | WR | 5-8 | 160 | So. | TR | Thornton, Colorado (Broomfield/Wyoming) | WO | 3/3 |
| 6 | McKAY, Gardner | CB | 5-11 | 150 | Fr. | HS | Inglewood, California (Crenshaw) | S | 5/4 |
| 79 | MOORE, Gary | OL | 6-6 | 320 | Sr. | 3L | Aurora, Colorado (Overland) | S | 1/1 |
| 23 | MOYD, Kevin | TB | 5-7 | 180 | Fr. | HS | Miramar, Florida (Northwestern) | S | 5/4 |
| 56 | NEWMAN, Greg | DE | 6-4 | 235 | Fr. | RS | Thousand Oaks, California (Westlake) | S | 4/4 |
| 73 | O’NEAL, Clint | OL | 6-6 | 305 | Sr. | 3L | Weatherford, Texas (Weatherford) | S | 1/1 |
| 59 | PACE, Gregory | SN | 5-11 | 235 | Sr. | 1L | Hinsdale, Ill. (Central) | S | 2/1 |
| 77 | POLUMBUS, Tyler | OL | 6-8 | 280 | So. | 1L | Englewood, Colorado (Cherry Creek) | S | 3/3 |
| 23 | REID, Corey | CB | 5-9 | 180 | Fr. | RS | Detroit (Thurston) | S | 4/4 |
| 1 | ROBINSON, Stephone | CB | 5-9 | 185 | So. | 1L | Denver, Colorado (Mullen) | S | 3/3 |
| 75 | SANDERS, Daniel | OL | 6-3 | 285 | Fr. | RS | Vista, California (El Camino) | S | 4/4 |
| 13 | SANDERS, Joe | ILB | 6-3 | 220 | So. | 1L | Nashville, Tenn. (Hillsboro) | S | 3/3 |
| 43 | SCHAUB, Brendan | FB | 6-4 | 250 | Sr. | 1L | Aurora, Colorado (Overland/Whittier) | WO | 1/1 |
| 2 | SHERMAN, Charlie III | S | 6-1 | 190 | Fr. | RS | Sacramento, California (Foothill) | S | 4/4 |
| 22 | SIMS, Lorenzo, Jr. | CB | 5-11 | 185 | Jr. | 2L | Fresno, California (Edison) | S | 3/2 |
| 83 | SPRAGUE, Dusty | WR | 6-4 | 190 | So. | 1L | Holyoke, Colorado (Holyoke) | S | 3/3 |
| 45 | SYPNIEWSKI, Quinn | TE | 6-7 | 265 | Sr. | 3L | Granger, Iowa (Johnston) | S | 1/1 |
| 63 | TIPTON, Jack | OL | 6-3 | 285 | Jr. | 1L | Arvada, Colorado (Pomona) | S | 2/2 |
| 29 | TORP, John | P | 6-2 | 205 | Sr. | 2L | Louisville, Colorado (Monarch) | S | 1/1 |
| 94 | VEIKUNE, David | DE | 6-2 | 230 | Fr. | RS | Wahiawa, Hawai’i (Campbell) | S | 4/4 |
| 17 | VICKERS, Lawrence | VB | 6-2 | 235 | Sr. | 3L | Houston, Texas (Forest Brook) | S | 2/1 |
| 15 | WALTERS, Ryan | S | 5-11 | 195 | Fr. | RS | Aurora, Colorado (Grandview) | S | 4/4 |
| 10 | WASHINGTON, Terry | CB | 5-9 | 190 | Jr. | JC | St. Louis, Mo. (Cleveland/Garden City CC) | S | 3/2 |
| 49 | WASHINGTON, Thaddaeus | ILB | 5-11 | 240 | Jr. | 2L | Marrero, La. (John Ehret) | S | 2/2 |
| 7 | WASHINGTON, Vance | CB | 5-10 | 185 | Jr. | 2L | Friendswood, Texas (Clear Brook) | S | 2/2 |
| 26 | WHEATLEY, Terrence | CB | 5-10 | 170 | Jr. | 2L | Richardson, Texas (Plano East) | S | 3/2 |
| 3 | WHITE, Brian | QB | 6-5 | 235 | So. | VR | Mission Viejo, California (Trabuco Hills) | S | 3/3 |
| 4 | WILLIAMS, Patrick | WR | 6-2 | 200 | Fr. | RS | DeSoto, Texas (DeSoto) | S | 4/4 |
| 20 | WILSON, Terry | CB | 5-11 | 200 | Fr. | RS | Chino, California (Junipero Serra) | S | 4/4 |
| 53 | WRIGHT, Abraham | DE | 6-3 | 240 | Jr. | 1L | Oklahoma City (Southeast/NE Oklahoma A&M) | S | 2/2 |
| 80 | YATES, Jarrell | WR | 6-0 | 170 | Fr. | HS | Denver(Montbello) | S | 5/4 |
| 93 | EMPY II, Austin | DT | 6-0 | 275 | So. | HS | Dallas, Seagoville HS. | S | 5/4 |
