= 2005 Oklahoma Sooners football team =

American college football season

2005 Oklahoma Sooners football

Holiday Bowl champion

Holiday Bowl, W 17–14 vs. Oregon
- Conference: Big 12 Conference

Ranking
- Coaches: No. 22
- AP: No. 22
- Record: 8–4 (6–2 Big 12)
- Head coach: Bob Stoops (7th season)
- Co-offensive coordinators: Chuck Long (4th season); Kevin Wilson (4th season)
- Offensive scheme: Spread
- Defensive coordinator: Brent Venables (7th season)
- Base defense: 4–3
- Captains: Dusty Dvoracek; Clint Ingram; Davin Joseph; J.D. Runnels
- Home stadium: Gaylord Family Oklahoma Memorial Stadium

2005 Big 12 Conference football standings
| | Conf. | | | Overall |
| Team | W | | L | W | | L |
|---|---|---|---|---|---|---|
North Division
| Colorado x | 5 | – | 3 | 7 | – | 6 |
| No. 24 Nebraska | 4 | – | 4 | 8 | – | 4 |
| Missouri | 4 | – | 4 | 7 | – | 5 |
| Iowa State | 4 | – | 4 | 7 | – | 5 |
| Kansas | 3 | – | 5 | 7 | – | 5 |
| Kansas State | 2 | – | 6 | 5 | – | 6 |
South Division
| No. 1 Texas x$# | 8 | – | 0 | 13 | – | 0 |
| No. 20 Texas Tech | 6 | – | 2 | 9 | – | 3 |
| No. 22 Oklahoma | 6 | – | 2 | 8 | – | 4 |
| Texas A&M | 3 | – | 5 | 5 | – | 6 |
| Baylor | 2 | – | 6 | 5 | – | 6 |
| Oklahoma State | 1 | – | 7 | 4 | – | 7 |
Championship: Texas 70, Colorado 3
# – BCS National Champion; $ – BCS representative as conference champion; x – Division champion/co-champions; Rankings from AP Poll

The 2005 Oklahoma Sooners football team represented the University of Oklahoma in the 2005 NCAA Division I-A football season, the 111th season of Sooner football. The team was led by two-time Walter Camp Coach of the Year Award winner, Bob Stoops, in his seventh season as head coach. They played their home games at Gaylord Family Oklahoma Memorial Stadium in Norman, Oklahoma. They were a charter member of the Big 12 Conference.

Conference play began with a loss in the annual Red River Rivalry to the Texas Longhorns on October 8, and ended with a win at home in the annual Bedlam Series over the Oklahoma State Cowboys on November 26. The Sooners finished the regular season with a 7–4 record (6–2 in the Big 12), their worst record since 1999, finishing in a tie with Texas Tech for second in the Big 12 South. They were invited to the Holiday Bowl, where they upset the Oregon Ducks, 17–14.

Following the season, Davin Joseph was selected 23rd overall in the 2006 NFL draft, along with Chris Chester in the 2nd round, Dusty Dvoracek, Travis Wilson and Clint Ingram in the 3rd, and J. D. Runnels in the 6th.

On July 11, 2007, the NCAA announced the Sooners would have to vacate every game from 2005 due to NCAA violations relating to Rhett Bomar and J.D. Quinn receiving money from a car dealership for work they did not perform. The punishment effectively gave the team a 0–4 record. However, on appeal, those wins were reinstated in early 2008.

== Schedule ==
| Date | Time | Opponent | Rank | Site | TV | Result | Attendance |
|---|---|---|---|---|---|---|---|
| September 3 | 11:00 a.m. | TCU* | No. 7 | Gaylord Family Oklahoma Memorial Stadium; Norman, OK | ABC | L 10–17 | 84,332 |
| September 10 | 11:30 a.m. | Tulsa* | No. 18 | Gaylord Family Oklahoma Memorial Stadium; Norman, OK | FSN | W 31–15 | 83,877 |
| September 17 | 2:30 p.m. | at UCLA* | No. 21 | Rose Bowl; Pasadena, CA | ABC | L 24–41 | 56,552 |
| October 1 | 6:00 p.m. | Kansas State | | Gaylord Family Oklahoma Memorial Stadium; Norman, OK | FSN | W 43–21 | 84,501 |
| October 8 | 12:00 p.m. | vs. No. 2 Texas | | Cotton Bowl; Dallas, TX (Red River Rivalry) | ABC | L 12–45 | 75,452 |
| October 15 | 6:00 p.m. | vs. Kansas | | Arrowhead Stadium; Kansas City, MO | TBS | W 19–3 | 54,109 |
| October 22 | 6:00 p.m. | Baylor | | Gaylord Family Oklahoma Memorial Stadium; Norman, OK | FSN | W 37–30 ^{2OT} | 83,456 |
| October 29 | 11:00 a.m. | at Nebraska | | Memorial Stadium; Lincoln, NE (rivalry) | ABC | W 31–24 | 77,438 |
| November 12 | 11:00 a.m. | Texas A&M | | Gaylord Family Oklahoma Memorial Stadium; Norman, OK | ABC | W 36–30 | 84,943 |
| November 19 | 11:00 a.m. | at No. 19 Texas Tech | | Jones SBC Stadium; Lubbock, TX | FSN | L 21–23 | 52,625 |
| November 26 | 2:30 p.m. | Oklahoma State | | Gaylord Family Oklahoma Memorial Stadium; Norman, OK (Bedlam Series) | ABC | W 42–14 | 84,875 |
| December 29 | 7:00 p.m. | vs. No. 6 Oregon* | | Qualcomm Stadium; San Diego, CA (Holiday Bowl) | ESPN | W 17–14 | 65,416 |
*Non-conference game; Rankings from AP Poll released prior to the game; All times are in Central time

== Game summaries ==
=== TCU ===
TCU Horned Frogs at #7 Oklahoma Sooners

| Team | 1 | 2 | 3 | 4 | Total |
|---|---|---|---|---|---|
| • TCU | 0 | 10 | 0 | 7 | 17 |
| #7 Oklahoma | 0 | 0 | 10 | 0 | 10 |

- Date: September 3
- Location: Gaylord Family Oklahoma Memorial Stadium, Norman, Oklahoma
- Game start: 11:00 a.m. CST
- Elapsed time: 3:54
- Game attendance: 84,332
- Referee: Drew George
- TV announcers (ABC): Dr. Jerry Punch (Play-by-play), Terry Bowden (Color), & Trenni Kusnierek (Sideline)

=== Tulsa ===
Tulsa Golden Hurricane at #18 Oklahoma Sooners

| Team | 1 | 2 | 3 | 4 | Total |
|---|---|---|---|---|---|
| Tulsa | 0 | 6 | 3 | 6 | 15 |
| • #18 Oklahoma | 7 | 0 | 7 | 17 | 31 |

- Date: September 10
- Location: Gaylord Family Oklahoma Memorial Stadium, Norman, Oklahoma
- Game start: 11:35 a.m. CST
- Elapsed time: 3:31
- Game attendance: 83,877
- Referee: Cooper Castleberry
- TV announcers (FSN): Bill Land (Play-by-play), Dave Lapham (Color), & Jim Knox (Sideline)

=== UCLA ===
#21 Oklahoma Sooners at UCLA Bruins

| Team | 1 | 2 | 3 | 4 | Total |
|---|---|---|---|---|---|
| #21 Oklahoma | 7 | 3 | 7 | 7 | 24 |
| • UCLA | 10 | 3 | 7 | 21 | 41 |

- Date: September 17
- Location: Rose Bowl, Pasadena, California
- Game start: 2:40 p.m. CST
- Elapsed time: 3:34
- Game attendance: 56,522
- Referee: Jack Folliard
- TV announcers (ABC): Keith Jackson (Play-by-play), Dan Fouts (Color), & Todd Harris (Sideline)

=== Kansas State ===
Kansas State Wildcats at Oklahoma Sooners

| Team | 1 | 2 | 3 | 4 | Total |
|---|---|---|---|---|---|
| Kansas State | 0 | 0 | 15 | 6 | 21 |
| • Oklahoma | 9 | 10 | 14 | 10 | 43 |

- Date: October 1
- Location: Gaylord Family Oklahoma Memorial Stadium, Norman, Oklahoma
- Game start: 6:00 p.m. CST
- Elapsed time: 3:36
- Game attendance: 84,501
- Referee: Jon Bible
- TV announcers (FSN): Bill Land (Play-by-play), Gary Reasons (Color), & Jim Knox (Sideline)

=== Texas (Red River Rivalry) ===
Oklahoma Sooners vs. #2 Texas Longhorns

| Team | 1 | 2 | 3 | 4 | Total |
|---|---|---|---|---|---|
| Oklahoma | 6 | 0 | 0 | 6 | 12 |
| • #2 Texas | 14 | 10 | 7 | 14 | 45 |

- Date: October 8
- Location: Cotton Bowl, Dallas
- Game start: 12:06 p.m. CST
- Elapsed time: 3:35
- Game attendance: 75,452
- Referee: Steve Usechek
- TV announcers (ABC): Keith Jackson (Play-by-play), Dan Fouts (Color), & Todd Harris (Sideline)

=== Kansas ===
Oklahoma Sooners at Kansas Jayhawks

| Team | 1 | 2 | 3 | 4 | Total |
|---|---|---|---|---|---|
| • Oklahoma | 10 | 0 | 0 | 9 | 19 |
| Kansas | 3 | 0 | 0 | 0 | 3 |

- Date: October 15
- Location: Arrowhead Stadium, Kansas City, Missouri
- Game start: 6:10 p.m. CST
- Elapsed time: 3:13
- Game attendance: 54,109
- Referee: Tom Walker
- TV announcers (TBS): Ron Thulin (Play-by-play), Charles Davis (Color), & Craig Sager (Sideline)

=== Baylor ===
Baylor Bears at Oklahoma Sooners

| Team | 1 | 2 | 3 | 4 | OT | 2OT | Total |
|---|---|---|---|---|---|---|---|
| Baylor | 6 | 7 | 6 | 8 | 3 | 0 | 30 |
| • Oklahoma | 0 | 24 | 0 | 3 | 3 | 7 | 37 |

- Date: October 22
- Location: Gaylord Family Oklahoma Memorial Stadium, Norman, Oklahoma
- Game start: 6:10 p.m. CST
- Elapsed time: 4:12
- Game attendance: 83,456
- Referee: Cooper Castleberry
- TV announcers (FSN): Drew Goodman (Play-by-play), Gary Reasons (Color), & Jim Knox (Sideline)

=== Nebraska ===
Oklahoma Sooners at Nebraska Cornhuskers

| Team | 1 | 2 | 3 | 4 | Total |
|---|---|---|---|---|---|
| • Oklahoma | 7 | 14 | 3 | 7 | 31 |
| Nebraska | 0 | 3 | 7 | 14 | 24 |

- Date: October 29
- Location: Memorial Stadium, Lincoln, Nebraska
- Game start: 11:13 a.m. CST
- Elapsed time: 3:39
- Game attendance: 77,438
- Referee: Steve Usechek
- TV announcers (ABC): Gary Thorne (Play-by-play), Ed Cunningham (Color), & Mark Morgan (Sideline)

=== Texas A&M ===
Texas A&M Aggies at Oklahoma Sooners

| Team | 1 | 2 | 3 | 4 | Total |
|---|---|---|---|---|---|
| Texas A&M | 7 | 7 | 10 | 6 | 30 |
| • Oklahoma | 28 | 0 | 2 | 6 | 36 |

- Date: November 12
- Location: Gaylord Family Oklahoma Memorial Stadium, Norman, Oklahoma
- Game start: 11:05 a.m. CST
- Elapsed time: 3:58
- Game attendance: 84,943
- Referee: Jon Bible
- TV announcers (ABC): Gary Thorne (Play-by-play), Ed Cunningham (Color), & Mark Morgan (Sideline)

=== Texas Tech ===
Oklahoma Sooners at Texas Tech Red Raiders

| Team | 1 | 2 | 3 | 4 | Total |
|---|---|---|---|---|---|
| Oklahoma | 0 | 7 | 0 | 14 | 21 |
| • Texas Tech | 3 | 7 | 0 | 13 | 23 |

- Date: November 19
- Location: Jones SBC Stadium, Lubbock, Texas
- Game start: 11:10 a.m. CST
- Elapsed time: 3:43
- Game attendance: 52,625
- Referee: Randy Christal
- TV announcers (FSN): Drew Goodman (Play-by-play), Dave Lapham (Color), & Jim Knox (Sideline)

=== Oklahoma State (Bedlam Series) ===
Oklahoma State Cowboys at Oklahoma Sooners

| Team | 1 | 2 | 3 | 4 | Total |
|---|---|---|---|---|---|
| Oklahoma State | 0 | 7 | 0 | 7 | 14 |
| • Oklahoma | 14 | 7 | 7 | 14 | 42 |

- Date: November 26
- Location: Gaylord Family Oklahoma Memorial Stadium, Norman, Oklahoma
- Game start: 2:37 p.m. CST
- Elapsed time: 3:32
- Game attendance: 84,875
- Referee: Bill Davenport
- TV announcers (ABC): Terry Gannon (Play-by-play), Jamal Anderson (Color), & Dave LaMont (Sideline)

=== Oregon (Holiday Bowl) ===
#6 Oregon Ducks vs. Oklahoma Sooners

| Team | 1 | 2 | 3 | 4 | Total |
|---|---|---|---|---|---|
| #6 Oregon | 7 | 0 | 0 | 7 | 14 |
| • Oklahoma | 3 | 0 | 14 | 0 | 17 |

- Date: December 29
- Location: Qualcomm Stadium, San Diego
- Game start: 7:12 p.m. CST
- Elapsed time: 3:48
- Game attendance: 65,416
- Referee: Bill LeMonnier
- TV announcers (ESPN): Keith Jackson (Play-by-play), Dan Fouts (Color), Todd Harris, & Holly Rowe (Sidelines)

Scoring summary
| 1 | 8:04 | OU | Garrett Hartley 34-yard field goal | OU 3–0 |
| 1 | 2:58 | ORE | Demetrius Williams 5-yard run (Paul Martinez kick) | ORE 7–3 |
| 3 | 9:20 | OU | J.D. Runnels 17-yard pass from Rhett Bomar (Garrett Hartley kick) | OU 10–7 |
| 3 | 3:25 | OU | Kejuan Jones 8-yard run (Garrett Hartley kick) | OU 17–7 |
| 4 | 3:30 | ORE | Tim Day 3-yard pass from Brady Leaf (Paul Martinez kick) | OU 17–14 |

== Rankings ==
Ranking movements Legend: ██ Increase in ranking ██ Decrease in ranking — = Not ranked RV = Received votes
| | Week | | | | | | | | | | | | | | | |
| Poll | Pre | 1 | 2 | 3 | 4 | 5 | 6 | 7 | 8 | 9 | 10 | 11 | 12 | 13 | 14 | Final |
|---|---|---|---|---|---|---|---|---|---|---|---|---|---|---|---|---|
| AP | 7 | 18 | 21 | — | — | — | — | — | — | RV | RV | RV | RV | RV | RV | 22 |
| Coaches | 5 | 16 | 17 | RV | — | RV | — | — | RV | RV | RV | RV | RV | RV | RV | 22 |
| Harris | Not released | | | | — | RV | — | RV | — | RV | RV | RV | RV | RV | RV | Not released |
| BCS | Not released | | | | | | | — | — | 25 | — | 25 | — | 23 | 23 | Not released |

== Statistics ==
=== Team ===
| | OU | Opp |
|---|---|---|
| Points per Game | 26.9 | 23.1 |
| First Downs | 231 | 206 |
| Rushing | 113 | 62 |
| Passing | 103 | 120 |
| Penalty | 15 | 24 |
| Rushing Yardage | 2,130 | 1,087 |
| Rushing Attempts | 526 | 392 |
| Avg per Rush | 4.0 | 2.8 |
| Avg per Game | 177.6 | 216.1 |
| Passing Yardage | 2,131 | 2,593 |
| Avg per Game | 177.5 | 90.6 |
| Completions-Attempts | 179-336 (53.3%) | 232-438 (53%) |
| Total Offense | 4,261 | 3,680 |
| Total Plays | 862 | 830 |
| Avg per Play | 4.9 | 4.4 |
| Avg per Game | 177.6 | 216.1 |
| Fumbles-Lost | 31–13 | 23–10 |

| | OU | Opp |
|---|---|---|
| Punts-Yards | 71–3,004 (42.3 avg) | 79–3,370 (42.7 avg) |
| Punt returns-Total Yards | 30–222 (7.4 avg) | 18–122 (6.8 avg) |
| Kick returns-Total Yards | 39–709 (18.2 avg) | 34–600 (17.6 avg) |
| Avg Time of Possession per Game | 31:29 | 28:31 |
| Penalties-Yards | 102–860 | 91–683 |
| Avg per Game | 71.7 | 56.9 |
| 3rd Down Conversions | 68/190 (35.8%) | 59/181 (32.6%) |
| 4th Down Conversions | 12/19 (63.2%) | 7/16 (43.8%) |
| Sacks By-Yards | 45–274 | 21–170 |
| Total TDs | 40 | 34 |
| Rushing | 27 | 11 |
| Passing | 10 | 20 |
| Fields Goals-Attempts | 14–22 (63.6%) | 14–18 (77.8%) |
| PAT-Attempts | 37–38 (97.4%) | 27–28 (96.4%) |
| Total Attendance | 505,984 | 186,585 |
| Avg per Game | 84,331 | 62,195 |

=== Scores by quarter ===
| | 1 | 2 | 3 | 4 | OT | Total |
|---|---|---|---|---|---|---|
| Opponents | 50 | 60 | 55 | 109 | 3 | 277 |
| Oklahoma | 91 | 65 | 64 | 93 | 10 | 323 |

== 2006 NFL draft ==
The 2006 NFL draft was held on April 29–30, 2006 at the Radio City Music Hall in New York City. The following Oklahoma players were either selected or signed as undrafted free agents following the draft.

| Player | Position | Round | Overall Pick | NFL team |
|---|---|---|---|---|
| Davin Joseph | G | 1st | 23 | Tampa Bay Buccaneers |
| Chris Chester | G | 2nd | 56 | Baltimore Ravens |
| Dusty Dvoracek | DT | 3rd | 73 | Chicago Bears |
| Travis Wilson | WR | 3rd | 78 | Cleveland Browns |
| Clint Ingram | LB | 3rd | 80 | Jacksonville Jaguars |
| J.D. Runnels | RB | 6th | 195 | Chicago Bears |
| Remi Ayodele | DT | Undrafted | | New England Patriots |
| Eric Bassey | FS | Undrafted | | Buffalo Bills |
