= 2005 Independence Bowl =

| South Carolina Gamecocks | Missouri Tigers |
| (7–4) | (6–5) |
| SEC | Big 12 |
| 31 | 38 |
| Head coach: Steve Spurrier | Head coach: Gary Pinkel |
| | 1 | 2 | 3 | 4 | Total |
|---|---|---|---|---|---|
| South Carolina | 21 | 7 | 0 | 3 | 31 |
| Missouri | 0 | 14 | 7 | 17 | 38 |
- Date: December 30, 2005
- Season: 2005
- Stadium: Independence Stadium
- Location: Shreveport, Louisiana
- MVP: QB Brad Smith – Missouri; CB Marcus King – Missouri
- Referee: David Cutaia (Pac-10)
- Attendance: 41,332
- Payout: US$2,400,000

United States TV coverage
- Network: ESPN
- Announcers: Sean McDonough (Play by Play); Craig James (Analyst); Mike Gottfried (Analyst); Alex Flanagan (Sideline)

The 2005 Independence Bowl, the 30th in the history of the College Football bowl game, saw the Missouri Tigers of the Big 12 overcome a 21–0 deficit late in the first quarter to defeat the SEC's South Carolina Gamecocks, 38–31 in the 30th edition of the bowl game. Quarterback Brad Smith and cornerback Marcus King, both of Missouri, were named the offensive and defensive players of the game.
