= 2005 Texas Tech Red Raiders football team =

American college football season

2005 Texas Tech Red Raiders football

Cotton Bowl Classic, L 10–13 vs. Alabama
- Conference: Big 12 Conference
- South Division

Ranking
- Coaches: No. 19
- AP: No. 20
- Record: 9–3 (6–2 Big 12)
- Head coach: Mike Leach (6th season)
- Co-offensive coordinators: Sonny Dykes (1st season); Dana Holgorsen (1st season)
- Offensive scheme: Air raid
- Defensive coordinator: Lyle Setencich (3rd season)
- Base defense: 3–4
- Home stadium: Jones SBC Stadium

2005 Big 12 Conference football standings
	Conf.			Overall
Team	W		L	W		L
North Division
Colorado x	5	–	3	7	–	6
No. 24 Nebraska	4	–	4	8	–	4
Missouri	4	–	4	7	–	5
Iowa State	4	–	4	7	–	5
Kansas	3	–	5	7	–	5
Kansas State	2	–	6	5	–	6
South Division
No. 1 Texas x$#	8	–	0	13	–	0
No. 20 Texas Tech	6	–	2	9	–	3
No. 22 Oklahoma	6	–	2	8	–	4
Texas A&M	3	–	5	5	–	6
Baylor	2	–	6	5	–	6
Oklahoma State	1	–	7	4	–	7
Championship: Texas 70, Colorado 3
# – BCS National Champion; $ – BCS representative as conference champion; x – Division champion/co-champions; Rankings from AP Poll

The 2005 Texas Tech Red Raiders football team represented Texas Tech University as a member of the Big 12 Conference during the 2005 NCAA Division I-A football season. In their sixth season under head coach Mike Leach, the Red Raiders compiled an overall record of 9–3 record with a mark of 6–2 in conference play, finished in a tie for second place in Southern Division of the Big 12, lost to Alabama in the 2006 Cotton Bowl Classic, and outscored opponents by a combined total of 473 to 226. The team played its home games at Jones SBC Stadium in Lubbock, Texas.

== Schedule ==
Date	Time	Opponent	Rank	Site	TV	Result	Attendance
September 10	6:00 p.m.	FIU*	No. 21	Jones SBC Stadium; Lubbock, TX		W 56–3	50,156
September 17	6:00 p.m.	Sam Houston State*	No. 19	Jones SBC Stadium; Lubbock, TX		W 80–21	50,171
September 24	6:00 p.m.	Indiana State*	No. 19	Jones SBC Stadium; Lubbock, TX	FSSW	W 63–7	44,681
October 1	6:00 p.m.	Kansas	No. 16	Jones SBC Stadium; Lubbock, TX		W 30–17	52,601
October 8	3:00 p.m.	at Nebraska	No. 15	Memorial Stadium; Lincoln, NE	TBS	W 34–31	77,580
October 15	11:00 a.m.	Kansas State^{†}	No. 13	Jones SBC Stadium; Lubbock, TX	ABC	W 59–20	50,813
October 22	2:30 p.m.	at No. 2 Texas	No. 10	Darrell K Royal–Texas Memorial Stadium; Austin, TX (rivalry, College GameDay)	ABC	L 17–52	83,919
October 29	11:30 a.m.	at Baylor	No. 17	Floyd Casey Stadium; Waco, TX (rivalry)	FSN	W 28–0	43,525
November 5	6:00 p.m.	Texas A&M	No. 16	Jones SBC Stadium; Lubbock, TX (rivalry)	FSN	W 56–17	55,755
November 12	1:00 p.m.	at Oklahoma State	No. 13	Boone Pickens Stadium; Stillwater, OK		L 17–24	40,035
November 19	11:00 a.m.	Oklahoma	No. 21	Jones SBC Stadium; Lubbock, TX	FSN	W 23–21	52,625
January 2	10:00 a.m.	vs. No. 13 Alabama*	No. 18	Cotton Bowl; Dallas, TX (Cotton Bowl Classic)	FOX	L 10–13 (Note: Alabama's win in the Cotton Bowl was later vacated by the NCAA due to infractions committed by the Crimson Tide during the season.)	74,222
*Non-conference game; ^{†}Homecoming; Rankings from AP Poll released prior to the game; All times are in Central time

== Rankings ==
Ranking movements Legend: ██ Increase in ranking ██ Decrease in ranking
	Week															
Poll	Pre	1	2	3	4	5	6	7	8	9	10	11	12	13	14	Final
AP	21	21	19	19	16	15	13	10	17	16	13	21	18	18	18	20
Coaches	21	19	19	16	13	13	11	8	16	17	13	19	17	16	15	19
Harris	Not released				16	15	13	9	16	16	12	19	17	16	15	Not released
BCS	Not released							7	16	15	12	19	16	16	15	Not released

== Game summaries ==
=== FIU ===
FIU Golden Panthers at No. 21 Texas Tech Red Raiders – Game summary

Quarter	1	2	3	4	Total
Golden Panthers	0	3	0	0	3
No. 21 Red Raiders	14	14	7	21	56

at Jones SBC Stadium, Lubbock, Texas

- Date: September 10
- Game time: 6:00 p.m.
- Game weather: Temperature: 87 °F (31 °C) • Weather: Partly cloudy • Wind: SSE 14 MPH
- Game attendance: 50,156
- Referee: Tom Walker
- Box score, Recap

Game information

First quarter

- TTU – Taurean Henderson 20-yard run (Alex Trlica kick), 8:24. Red Raiders 7–0. Drive: 6 plays, 60 yards, 1:19.
- TTU – Danny Amendola 7-yard pass from Cody Hodges (Alex Trlica kick), 4:07. Red Raiders 14–0. Drive: 4 plays, 46 yards, 1:49.

Second quarter

- TTU – Cody Hodges 17-yard run (Alex Trlica kick), 12:17. Red Raiders 21–0. Drive: 12 plays, 97 yards, 2:55.
- FIU – Adam Moss 36-yard field goal, 6:49. Red Raiders 21–3. Drive: 15 plays, 61 yards, 5:28.
- TTU – Robert Johnson 47-yard pass from Cody Hodges (Alex Trlica kick), 4:38. Red Raiders 28–3. Drive: 4 plays, 80 yards, 2:11.

Third quarter

- TTU – Taurean Henderson 38-yard pass from Cody Hodges (Alex Trlica kick), 6:28. Red Raiders 35–3. Drive: 1 play, 38 yards, 0:10.

Fourth quarter

- TTU – Danny Amendola 39-yard pass from Cody Hodges (Alex Trlica kick), 13:46. Red Raiders 42–3. Drive: 7 plays, 90 yards, 2:30.
- TTU – Shannon Woods 7-yard run (Alex Trlica kick), 9:19. Red Raiders 49–3. Drive: 5 plays, 38 yards, 1:18.
- TTU – Shannon Woods 2-yard run (Alex Trlica kick), 5:14. Red Raiders 56–3. Drive: 8 plays, 64 yards, 2:38.

Top passers

- FIU – Josh Padrick – 21/32, 172 yards
- TTU – Cody Hodges – 29/37, 454 yards, 4 TD

Top rushers

- FIU – Julian Reams – 16 rushes, 85 yards
- TTU – Taurean Henderson – 8 rushes, 67 yards, TD

Top receivers

- FIU – Chandler Williams – 7 receptions, 74 yards
- TTU – Robert Johnson – 9 receptions, 129 yards, TD

=== Sam Houston State ===
Sam Houston State Bearkats at No. 19 Texas Tech Red Raiders – Game summary

Quarter	1	2	3	4	Total
Bearkats	0	7	0	14	21
No. 19 Red Raiders	28	21	17	14	80

at Jones SBC Stadium, Lubbock, Texas

- Date: September 17
- Game time: 6:00 p.m.
- Game weather: Temperature: 94 °F (34 °C) • Weather: Mostly cloudy • Wind: S 12 MPH
- Game attendance: 50,171
- Referee: James Hatfield
- Box score, Recap

Game information

First quarter

- TTU – Jarrett Hicks 22-yard pass from Cody Hodges (Alex Trlica kick), 12:56. Red Raiders 7–0. Drive: 6 plays, 54 yards, 2:04.
- TTU – Taurean Henderson 3-yard run (Alex Trlica kick), 10:40. Red Raiders 14–0. Drive: 4 plays, 69 yards, 0:43.
- TTU – Taurean Henderson 2-yard run (Alex Trlica kick), 6:15. Red Raiders 21–0. Drive: 9 plays, 44 yards, 2:42.
- TTU – Jarrett Hicks 1-yard pass from Cody Hodges (Alex Trlica kick), 0:40. Red Raiders 28–0. Drive: 9 plays, 59 yards, 3:43.

Second quarter

- TTU – Joel Filani 11-yard pass from Cody Hodges (Alex Trlica kick), 11:59. Red Raiders 35–0. Drive: 4 plays, 75 yards, 2:04.
- SHSU – Stevie Smith 19-yard run (Lance Garner kick), 9:33. Red Raiders 35–7. Drive: 5 plays, 54 yards, 2:26.
- TTU – Danny Amendola 13-yard pass from Cody Hodges (Alex Trlica kick), 6:47. Red Raiders 42–7. Drive: 8 plays, 85 yards, 2:46.
- TTU – Taurean Henderson 2-yard run (Alex Trlica kick), 0:34. Red Raiders 49–7. Drive: 4 plays, 45 yards, 0:31.

Third quarter

- TTU – Joel Filani 11-yard pass from Cody Hodges (Alex Trlica kick), 14:06. Red Raiders 56–7. Drive: 3 plays, 80 yards, 0:54.
- TTU – Alex Trlica 20-yard field goal, 9:33. Red Raiders 59–7. Drive: 8 plays, 62 yards, 2:54.
- TTU – Taurance Rawls 1-yard run (Alex Trlica kick), 3:24. Red Raiders 66–7. Drive: 5 plays, 67 yards, 2:04.

Fourth quarter

- SHSU – Jason Godfrey 1-yard run (Lance Garner kick), 14:55. Red Raiders 66–14. Drive: 13 plays, 80 yards, 3:29.
- TTU – Shannon Woods 41-yard pass from Graham Harrell (Alex Trlica kick), 12:46. Red Raiders 73–14. Drive: 5 plays, 69 yards, 2:09.
- TTU – Eric Morris 19-yard run (Alex Trlica kick), 6:11. Red Raiders 80–14. Drive: 9 plays, 70 yards, 5:26.
- SHSU – Justin Wells 6-yard pass from Phillip Daugherty (Lance Garner kick), 0:58. Red Raiders 80–21. Drive: 10 plays, 80 yards, 5:13.

Top passers

- SHSU – Phillip Daugherty – 13/25, 157 yards, TD
- TTU – Cody Hodges – 26/37, 436 yards, 5 TD

Top rushers

- SHSU – Stevie Smith – 4 rushes, 28 yards, TD
- TTU – Taurean Henderson – 10 rushes, 56 yards, 3 TD

Top receivers

- SHSU – Corey Roberts – 4 receptions, 50 yards
- TTU – Robert Johnson – 8 receptions, 209 yards

=== Indiana State ===
Indiana State Sycamores at No. 19 Texas Tech Red Raiders – Game summary

Quarter	1	2	3	4	Total
Sycamores	0	0	0	7	7
No. 19 Red Raiders	14	35	7	7	63

at Jones SBC Stadium, Lubbock, Texas

- Date: September 24
- Game time: 6:00 p.m.
- Game weather: Temperature: 89 °F (32 °C) • Weather: Clear • Wind: SE 8 MPH
- Game attendance: 44,681
- Referee: Steve Usechek
- Box score, Recap

=== Kansas ===
Kansas Jayhawks at No. 16 Texas Tech Red Raiders – Game summary

Quarter	1	2	3	4	Total
Jayhawks	0	0	14	3	17
No. 16 Red Raiders	7	13	7	3	30

at Jones SBC Stadium, Lubbock, Texas

- Date: October 1
- Game time: 6:00 p.m.
- Game weather: Temperature: 93 °F (34 °C) • Weather: Clear • Wind: WSW 11 MPH
- Game attendance: 52,601
- Referee: Clair Gausman
- Box score, Recap

=== At Nebraska ===
No. 15 Texas Tech Red Raiders at Nebraska Cornhuskers – Game summary

Quarter	1	2	3	4	Total
No. 15 Red Raiders	7	14	6	7	34
Cornhuskers	0	14	7	10	31

at Memorial Stadium, Lincoln, Nebraska

- Date: October 8
- Game time: 3:00 p.m.
- Game weather: Temperature: 62 °F (17 °C) • Weather: Sunny • Wind: S 7 MPH
- Game attendance: 77,580
- Referee: Jon Bible
- TV announcers (TBS): Bob Neal (play-by-play), Tom Ramsey (analyst), and Kip Lewis (sideline)
- Box score, Recap

=== Kansas State ===
Kansas State Wildcats at No. 13 Texas Tech Red Raiders – Game summary

Quarter	1	2	3	4	Total
Wildcats	3	10	7	0	20
No. 13 Red Raiders	3	14	28	14	59

at Jones SBC Stadium, Lubbock, Texas

- Date: October 15
- Game time: 11:00 a.m.
- Game weather: Temperature: 60 °F (16 °C) • Weather: Mostly cloudy • Wind: WNW 3 MPH
- Game attendance: 50,813
- Referee: Drew George
- TV announcers (ABC): Gary Thorne, Ed Cunningham, Mark Morgan
- Box score, Recap

Quarterback Cody Hodges finished the game 44-of-65 for 643 yards with five touchdowns and two interceptions. Hodges's 643 passing yards are the fourth most by a quarterback in Division I-A (now Division I FBS) and the second time a Texas Tech quarterback threw for over 600 yards in a single game, with B. J. Symons throwing for 661 yards against Ole Miss in 2003.

=== At No. 2 Texas ===
No. 10 Texas Tech Red Raiders at No. 2 Texas Longhorns – Game summary

Quarter	1	2	3	4	Total
No. 10 Red Raiders	7	3	7	0	17
No. 2 Longhorns	10	21	14	7	52

at Darrell K Royal–Texas Memorial Stadium, Austin, Texas

- Date: October 22
- Game time: 2:30 p.m.
- Game weather: Temperature: 75 °F (24 °C) • Weather: Clear • Wind: NNE 5–15 MPH
- Game attendance: 83,919
- Referee: Tom Walker
- TV announcers (ABC): Brent Musburger, Gary Danielson, Jack Arute
- Box score, Recap

=== At Baylor ===
No. 17 Texas Tech Red Raiders at Baylor Bears – Game summary

Quarter	1	2	3	4	Total
No. 17 Red Raiders	3	3	0	22	28
Bears	0	0	0	0	0

at Floyd Casey Stadium, Waco, Texas

- Date: October 29
- Game time: 11:30 a.m.
- Game weather: Temperature: 64 °F (18 °C) • Weather: Sunny • Wind: SSE 11 MPH
- Game attendance: 43,525
- Referee: Randy Christal
- TV announcers (FSN): Bill Land, Gary Reasons, John Rhadigan
- Box score, Recap

Game information

First quarter

- TTU – Alex Trlica 33-yard field goal, 6:46. Red Raiders 3–0. Drive: 11 plays, 52 yards, 2:50.

Second quarter

- TTU – Alex Trlica 47-yard field goal, 14:04. Red Raiders 6–0. Drive: 7 plays, 33 yards, 2:27.

Third quarter

- No scoring plays

Fourth quarter

- TTU – Robert Johnson 50-yard pass from Cody Hodges (Cody Hodges pass to Bristol Olomua), 10:32. Red Raiders 14–0. Drive: 5 plays, 68 yards, 2:07.
- TTU – Taurean Henderson 2-yard run (Alex Trlica kick), 5:46. Red Raiders 21–0. Drive: 4 plays, 73 yards, 1:19.
- TTU – Taurean Henderson 1-yard run (Alex Trlica kick), 2:48. Red Raiders 28–0. Drive: 3 plays, 32 yards, 1:27.

Top passers

- TTU – Cody Hodges – 22/44, 264 yards, TD, 2 INT
- BAY – Shawn Bell – 13/21, 127 yards, 2 INT

Top rushers

- TTU – Taurean Henderson – 18 rushes, 136 yards, 2 TD
- BAY – Paul Mosley – 18 rushes, 66 yards

Top receivers

- TTU – Jarrett Hicks – 7 receptions, 115 yards
- BAY – Trent Shelton – 3 receptions, 59 yards

=== Texas A&M ===
Texas A&M Aggies at No. 16 Texas Tech Red Raiders – Game summary

Quarter	1	2	3	4	Total
Aggies	3	7	0	7	17
No. 16 Red Raiders	14	0	21	21	56

at Jones SBC Stadium, Lubbock, Texas

- Date: November 5
- Game time: 6:00 p.m.
- Game weather: Temperature: 81 °F (27 °C) • Weather: Clear • Wind: W 14 MPH
- Game attendance: 55,755
- Referee: W. Davenport
- TV announcers (FSN): Drew Goodman, Gary Reasons, Jim Knox
- Box score, Recap

Game information

First quarter

- TTU – Jarrett Hicks 17-yard pass from Cody Hodges (Alex Trlica kick), 12:22. Red Raiders 7–0. Drive: 11 plays, 80 yards, 2:38.
- TTU – Taurean Henderson 19-yard run (Alex Trlica kick), 9:42. Red Raiders 14–0. Drive: 4 plays, 39 yards, 0:42.
- TAMU – Todd Pegram 25-yard field goal, 2:48. Red Raiders 14–3. Drive: 14 plays, 64 yards, 6:54.

Second quarter

- TAMU – Courtney Lewis 48-yard run (Todd Pegram kick), 14:45. Red Raiders 14–10. Drive: 3 plays, 64 yards, 0:39.

Third quarter

- TTU – Cody Hodges 1-yard run (Alex Trlica kick), 10:24. Red Raiders 21–10. Drive: 9 plays, 37 yards, 3:53.
- TTU – Taurean Henderson 4-yard run (Alex Trlica kick), 6:54. Red Raiders 28–10. Drive: 7 plays, 62 yards, 2:40.
- TTU – Taurean Henderson 4-yard run (Alex Trlica kick), 1:54. Red Raiders 35–10. Drive: 9 plays, 62 yards, 2:49.

Fourth quarter

- TAMU – Martel Bennett 1-yard pass from Reggie McNeal (Todd Pegram kick), 12:42. Red Raiders 35–17. Drive: 12 plays, 80 yards, 4:11.
- TTU – Jarrett Hicks 3-yard pass from Cody Hodges (Alex Trlica kick), 10:05. Red Raiders 42–17. Drive: 7 plays, 80 yards, 2:38.
- TTU – Taurean Henderson 3-yard run (Alex Trlica kick), 7:54. Red Raiders 49–17. Drive: 5 plays, 15 yards, 0:46.
- TTU – Slade Hodges 10-yard pass from Graham Harrell (Alex Trlica kick), 2:27. Red Raiders 56–17. Drive: 8 plays, 50 yards, 3:35.

Top passers

- TAMU – Reggie McNeal – 15/24, 131 yards, TD, INT
- TTU – Cody Hodges – 29/44, 408 yards, 2 TD, INT

Top rushers

- TAMU – Courtney Lewis – 10 rushes, 95 yards, TD
- TTU – Taurean Henderson – 20 rushes, 109 yards, 4 TD

Top receivers

- TAMU – Jason Carter – 6 receptions, 53 yards
- TTU – Jarrett Hicks – 8 receptions, 147 yards, 2 TD

=== At Oklahoma State ===
No. 13 Texas Tech Red Raiders at Oklahoma State Cowboys – Game summary

Quarter	1	2	3	4	Total
No. 13 Red Raiders	0	0	3	14	17
Cowboys	14	0	3	7	24

at Boone Pickens Stadium, Stillwater, Oklahoma

- Date: November 12
- Game time: 11:00 a.m.
- Game weather: Temperature: 81 °F (27 °C) • Weather: Fair and windy • Wind: SSW 22 MPH
- Game attendance: 40,035
- Referee: Tom Walker
- Box score, Recap

Game information

First quarter

- OKST – Mike Hamilton 83-yard run (Bruce Redden kick), 10:22. Cowboys 7–0. Drive: 5 plays, 98 yards, 2:04.
- OKST – D'Juan Woods 17-yard pass from Bobby Reid (Bruce Redden kick), 1:34. Cowboys 14–0. Drive: 13 plays, 66 yards, 6:06.

Second quarter

- No scoring plays

Third quarter

- OKST – Bruce Redden 29-yard field goal, 6:41. Cowboys 17–0. Drive: 11 plays, 38 yards, 5:03.
- TTU – Alex Trlica 29-yard field goal, 4:56. Cowboys 17–3. Drive: 6 plays, 68 yards, 1:45.

Fourth quarter

- TTU – Jarrett Hicks 4-yard pass from Cody Hodges (Alex Trlica kick), 14:42. Cowboys 17–10. Drive: 9 plays, 78 yards, 3:45.
- TTU – Chris Hudler 0-yard fumble return (Alex Trlica kick), 14:23. Tied 17–17.
- OKST – Al Pena 1-yard run (Bruce Redden kick), 0:23. Cowboys 24–17. Drive: 13 plays, 80 yards, 6:20.

Top passers

- TTU – Cody Hodges – 29/42, 308 yards, TD, INT
- OKST – Bobby Reid – 10/18, 82 yards, TD

Top rushers

- TTU – Cody Hodges – 11 rushes, 36 yards
- OKST – Mike Hamilton – 23 rushes, 161 yards, TD

Top receivers

- TTU – Robert Johnson – 5 receptions, 70 yards
- OKST – D'Juan Woods – 4 receptions, 37 yards, TD

=== Oklahoma ===
Oklahoma Sooners at No. 21 Texas Tech Red Raiders – Game summary

Quarter	1	2	3	4	Total
Sooners	0	7	0	14	21
No. 21 Red Raiders	3	7	0	13	23

at Jones SBC Stadium, Lubbock, Texas

- Date: November 19
- Game time: 11:00 a.m.
- Game weather: Temperature: 54 °F (12 °C) • Weather: Sunny with gusty winds • Wind: NNE 25–40 MPH
- Game attendance: 52,625
- Referee: Randy Christal
- TV announcers (FSN): Drew Goodman (play-by-play), Dave Lapham (analyst), and Jim Knox (sideline)
- Box score, Recap

Game information

First quarter

- TTU – Alex Trlica 33-yard field goal, 11:45. Red Raiders 3–0. Drive: 8 plays, 64 yards, 3:15.

Second quarter

- OKLA – Adrian Peterson 1-yard run (Garrett Hartley kick), 14:13. Sooners 7–3. Drive: 16 plays, 91 yards, 8:25.
- TTU – Jarrett Hicks 7-yard pass from Cody Hodges (Alex Trlica kick), 3:30. Red Raiders 10–7. Drive: 9 plays, 72 yards, 5:03.

Third quarter

- No scoring plays

Fourth quarter

- TTU – Bristol Olomua 3-yard pass from Cody Hodges (Alex Trlica kick), 14:35. Red Raiders 17–7. Drive: 6 plays, 80 yards, 2:38.
- OKLA – Malcolm Kelly 13-yard pass from Rhett Bomar (Garrett Hartley kick), 5:57. Red Raiders 17–14. Drive: 11 plays, 89 yards, 4:08.
- OKLA – Adrian Peterson 13-yard run (Garrett Hartley kick), 1:33. Sooners 21–17. Drive: 9 plays, 51 yards, 3:13.
- TTU – Taurean Henderson 2-yard run, 0:00. Red Raiders 23–21. Drive: 12 plays, 65 yards, 1:33.

Top passers

- OKLA – Rhett Bomar – 12/26, 118 yards, TD
- TTU – Cody Hodges – 24/37, 232 yards, 2 TD, 2 INT

Top rushers

- OKLA – Adrian Peterson – 29 rushes, 108 yards, 2 TD
- TTU – Taurean Henderson – 16 rushes, 109 yards, TD

Top receivers

- OKLA – Malcolm Kelly – 4 receptions, 49 yards, TD
- TTU – Joel Filani – 6 receptions, 82 yards

=== Vs. No. 13 Alabama (Cotton Bowl Classic) ===
No. 18 Texas Tech Red Raiders vs. No. 13 Alabama Crimson Tide (Cotton Bowl Classic) – Game summary

Quarter	1	2	3	4	Total
No. 18 Red Raiders	3	0	0	7	10
No. 13 Crimson Tide	7	0	3	3	13

at Cotton Bowl, Dallas, Texas

- Date: January 2, 2006
- Game time: 10:00 a.m.
- Game weather: Temperature: 63 °F (17 °C) • Weather: Clear and sunny • Wind: NNW 10 MPH
- Game attendance: 74,222
- Referee: Terry Leyden
- TV announcers (Fox): Thom Brennaman, Terry Donahue, Chris Rix, Jeanne Zelasko
- Box score, Recap

Game information

First quarter

- ALA – Keith Brown 76-yard pass from Brodie Croyle (Jamie Christensen kick), 11:37. Crimson Tide 7–0. Drive: 2 plays, 84 yards, 0:46.
- TTU – Alex Trlica 34-yard field goal, 3:00. Crimson Tide 7–3. Drive: 10 plays, 69 yards, 2:22.

Second quarter

- No scoring plays

Third quarter

- ALA – Jamie Christensen 31-yard field goal, 6:53. Crimson Tide 10–3. Drive: 17 plays, 67 yards, 8:07.

Fourth quarter

- TTU – Jarrett Hicks 12-yard pass from Cody Hodges (Alex Trlica kick), 2:56. Tied 10–10. Drive: 2 plays, 38 yards, 0:16.
- ALA – Jamie Christensen 45-yard field goal, 0:00. Crimson Tide 13–10. Drive: 10 plays, 58 yards, 2:56.

Top passers

- TTU – Cody Hodges – 15/32, 196 yards, TD
- ALA – Brodie Croyle – 19/31, 275 yards, TD

Top rushers

- TTU – Cody Hodges – 17 rushes, 66 yards
- ALA – Kenneth Darby – 29 rushes, 81 yards

Top receivers

- TTU – Joel Filani – 4 receptions, 67 yards
- ALA – Keith Brown – 5 receptions, 141 yards, TD

== Personnel ==
2005 Texas Tech Red Raiders football team roster
Players
Coaches
Offense

Pos.	#	Name	Class
OL	72	Josh Aleman	Fr
HB	20	Danny Amendola	So
OL	66	Cody Baker	Fr
RB	34	Justin Bradley	So
RB	40	Edward Britton	Fr
OL	64	Shawn Byrnes	Fr
OL	60	Brandon Carter	Fr
OL	76	David Chatterton	Fr
OL	68	Daniel Christian	Sr
WR	85	Chris Cunigan	Fr
WR	87	Michael Dorsey	Fr
WR	11	Brandon Douglas	Jr
WR	8	Joel Filani	Jr
OL	78	Gabe Hall	Jr
OL	71	Stephen Hamby	Fr
QB	6	Graham Harrell	Fr
RB	19	Taurean Henderson	Sr
WR	88	Jarrett Hicks	Jr
WR	85	Kelly Hildebrandt	So
QB	10	Cody Hodges	Sr
WR	83	Slade Hodges	Sr
WR	2	Catron Houston	Fr
OL	69	Glenn January	Jr
OL	61	Andrew Johnson	Fr
WR	27	Marquis Johnson	Jr
WR	9	Robert Johnson	Jr
OL	73	Brandon Jones	Jr
OL	62	Bryan Kegans	Sr
WR	15	John King	Fr
RB	37	Kobey Lewis	Fr
RB	32	Caesar Martinez	Sr
TE	26	Austin Mickelson	Fr
WR	12	Eric Morris	Fr
TE	33	Bristol Olomua	Sr
OL	63	Manuel Ramirez	Jr
RB	18	Taurance Rawls	So
WR	86	L. A. Reed	Fr
TE	80	Rylan Reed	Fr
RB	31	Pete Richardson	Fr
QB	7	Ryan Rowland	So
WR	29	David Schaefer	So
OL	77	David Spriggs	Fr
OL	79	Gary Taylor	Fr
QB	13	Chris Todd	Fr
OL	65	Louis Vasquez	Fr
WR	4	Todd Walker	Fr
WR	28	Travis Wheat	So
OL	75	E. J. Whitley	Sr
OL	67	Marlon Winn	Fr
WR	85	Josh Witherspoon	Fr
RB	21	Shannon Woods	Fr

Defense

Pos.	#	Name	Class
DB	31	Greg Aycock	Jr
DT	51	Dek Bake	Sr
DE	43	Brett Bischofberger	Sr
LB	41	Sylvester Brinkley	Sr
S	9	Chris Brister	Jr
CB	28	Marcus Bunton	Fr
DB	10	Daniel Charbonnet	So
DL	84	Randall Cherry	Sr
S	32	Hunter Coleman	So
CB	13	James Conwright	So
DE	96	Keyunta Dawson	Jr
DT	91	McKinner Dixon	Fr
CB	21	Clifton Eddington	Jr
CB	18	Phill Ervin	So
DB	24	Lance Fuller	Fr
FS	49	Joe Garcia	So
LB	50	Ryan Hale	Fr
LB	54	Chad Hill	So
S	23	Anthony Hines	Fr
DL	93	Chris Hudler	Jr
CB	36	Antonio Huffman	Jr
DE	95	Rashad Hunt	Fr
DE	52	Victor Hunter	Fr
DT	90	Brian Jones	Fr
DE	94	Philip Jones	Fr
LB	62	John Knust	Fr
CB	25	Sirdon Lewis	Sr
LB	68	Ty Linder	So
CB	7	Darcel McBath	Fr
LB	57	Jamequinlon McGill	Jr
FS	1	Vincent Meeks	Sr
DB	26	Khalid Naziruddin	Sr
CB	33	Brent Nickerson	Fr
DE	92	Seth Nitschmann	Jr
CB	82	Kennedy Offoegbu	Fr
CB	17	Chris Parker	So
DE	98	Jake Ratliff	Fr
S	18	Taylor Read	Fr
LB	46	Sandy Riley	Fr
S	27	Jordy Rowland	Fr
S	5	John Saldi	Sr
DL	99	Ken Scott	Jr
LB	42	Fletcher Session	Jr
LB	53	Calen Shearer	Fr
LB	39	Brent Slaughter	Jr
S	3	Dwayne Slay	Sr
LB	45	Brock Stratton	Jr
LB	29	Jordan Thomas	Fr
DL	97	Fred Thwreatt	Sr
LB	56	Kellen Tillman	Jr
S	84	Lashawn Vation	Fr
S	16	Loy White	So
DE	77	Jared Williams	Fr
LB	48	Paul Williams	So
DE	89	Tyler Yenzer	So

Special teams

Pos.	#	Name	Class
K	92	Grant Berg	So
DS	61	Michael Bettenhausen	So
DS	50	Austin Burns	Fr
P	22	Alex Reyes	Jr
P	87	Brandon Ritchey	So
DS	58	Ian Smetona	Sr
K	14	Keith Toogood	Jr
K	30	Alex Trlica	So

Head coach

- Mike Leach

Coordinators/assistant coaches

- Bill Bedenbaugh
  Offensive Line
- Sonny Dykes
  Co-offensive coordinator/wide receivers
- Dana Holgorsen
  Co-offensive coordinator/Inside Receivers
- Seth Littrell
  Running Backs
- Lyle Setencich
  Defensive coordinator/linebackers
- Ruffin McNeill
  Assistant Head Coach/special teams coordinator/defensive line
- Carlos Mainord
  Safeties
- Charlie Sadler
  Defensive Ends

Legend

- (C) Team captain
- (S) Suspended
- (I) Ineligible
- Injured
- Redshirt

Roster

== Players drafted into the NFL ==
Round	Pick	Player	Position	NFL club
7	216	E. J. Whitley	C	Dallas Cowboys
