= 2005 Iowa State Cyclones football team =

American college football season

2005 Iowa State Cyclones football

Houston Bowl, L 24–27 vs. TCU
- Conference: Big 12 Conference
- North Division
- Record: 7–5 (4–4 Big 12)
- Head coach: Dan McCarney (11th season)
- Offensive coordinator: Barney Cotton (2nd season)
- Offensive scheme: Spread
- Defensive coordinator: John Skladany (9th season)
- Base defense: 4–3
- Home stadium: Jack Trice Stadium

2005 Big 12 Conference football standings
| | Conf. | | | Overall |
| Team | W | | L | W | | L |
|---|---|---|---|---|---|---|
North Division
| Colorado x | 5 | – | 3 | 7 | – | 6 |
| No. 24 Nebraska | 4 | – | 4 | 8 | – | 4 |
| Missouri | 4 | – | 4 | 7 | – | 5 |
| Iowa State | 4 | – | 4 | 7 | – | 5 |
| Kansas | 3 | – | 5 | 7 | – | 5 |
| Kansas State | 2 | – | 6 | 5 | – | 6 |
South Division
| No. 1 Texas x$# | 8 | – | 0 | 13 | – | 0 |
| No. 20 Texas Tech | 6 | – | 2 | 9 | – | 3 |
| No. 22 Oklahoma | 6 | – | 2 | 8 | – | 4 |
| Texas A&M | 3 | – | 5 | 5 | – | 6 |
| Baylor | 2 | – | 6 | 5 | – | 6 |
| Oklahoma State | 1 | – | 7 | 4 | – | 7 |
Championship: Texas 70, Colorado 3
# – BCS National Champion; $ – BCS representative as conference champion; x – Division champion/co-champions; Rankings from AP Poll

The 2005 Iowa State Cyclones football team represented Iowa State University as a member of the North Division in the Big 12 Conference during the 2005 NCAA Division I-A football season. Led by 11th-year head coach Dan McCarney, the Cyclones compiled an overall record of 7–5 with a mark of 4–4 in conference play, placing in a three-way tie for second in the Big 12's North Division. Iowa State was invited to the Houston Bowl, where the Cyclones lost to TCU. The team played home games at Jack Trice Stadium in Ames, Iowa.

== Schedule ==
| Date | Time | Opponent | Rank | Site | TV | Result | Attendance | Source |
|---|---|---|---|---|---|---|---|---|
| September 3 | 6:00 p.m. | Illinois State* | | Jack Trice Stadium; Ames, IA | | W 32–21 | 44,058 | |
| September 10 | 2:30 p.m. | No. 8 Iowa* | | Jack Trice Stadium; Ames, IA (rivalry) | ABC | W 23–3 | 54,290 | |
| September 23 | 7:00 p.m. | at Army* | No. 22 | Michie Stadium; West Point, NY | ESPN2 | W 28–21 | 25,007 | |
| October 1 | 2:30 p.m. | at Nebraska | No. 23 | Memorial Stadium; Lincoln, NE (rivalry) | ABC | L 20–27 ^{2OT} | 77,743 | |
| October 8 | 1:00 p.m. | Baylor | | Jack Trice Stadium; Ames, IA | | L 13–23 | 45,992 | |
| October 15 | 1:00 p.m. | at Missouri | | Faurot Field; Columbia, MO (rivalry) | | L 24–27 ^{OT} | 55,016 | |
| October 22 | 1:00 p.m. | Oklahoma State^{†} | | Jack Trice Stadium; Ames, IA | | W 37–10 | 43,964 | |
| October 29 | 2:30 p.m. | at Texas A&M | | Kyle Field; College Station, TX | ABC | W 42–14 | 86,172 | |
| November 5 | 1:00 p.m. | Kansas State | | Jack Trice Stadium; Ames, IA (rivalry) | | W 45–17 | 42,686 | |
| November 12 | 6:00 p.m. | No. 22 Colorado | | Jack Trice Stadium; Ames, IA | FSN | W 30–16 | 49,242 | |
| November 26 | 11:30 a.m. | at Kansas | | Memorial Stadium; Lawrence, KS | FSN | L 21–24 ^{OT} | 42,826 | |
| December 31 | 1:30 p.m. | vs. No. 14 TCU* | | Reliant Stadium; Houston, TX (Houston Bowl) | ESPN | L 21–24 | 37,286 | |
*Non-conference game; ^{†}Homecoming; Rankings from AP Poll released prior to the game; All times are in Central time

== Rankings ==
Ranking movements Legend: ██ Increase in ranking ██ Decrease in ranking — = Not ranked RV = Received votes
| | Week | | | | | | | | | | | | | | | |
| Poll | Pre | 1 | 2 | 3 | 4 | 5 | 6 | 7 | 8 | 9 | 10 | 11 | 12 | 13 | 14 | Final |
|---|---|---|---|---|---|---|---|---|---|---|---|---|---|---|---|---|
| AP | RV | RV | 24 | 22 | 23 | RV | — | — | — | RV | RV | RV | RV | RV | RV | — |
| Coaches | RV | RV | RV | RV | RV | RV | — | — | — | — | RV | RV | 25 | RV | RV | — |
| Harris | Not released | | | | 23 | RV | RV | — | — | RV | RV | RV | 25 | RV | — | Not released |
| BCS | Not released | | | | | | | — | — | — | — | — | — | — | — | Not released |
