= 2005 Oklahoma State Cowboys football team =

American college football season

2005 Oklahoma State Cowboys football
- Conference: Big 12 Conference
- South Division
- Record: 4–7 (1–7 Big 12)
- Head coach: Mike Gundy (1st season)
- Offensive coordinator: Larry Fedora (1st season)
- Offensive scheme: Spread
- Defensive coordinator: Vance Bedford (1st season)
- Base defense: 4–3
- Home stadium: Boone Pickens Stadium

2005 Big 12 Conference football standings
	Conf.			Overall
Team	W		L	W		L
North Division
Colorado x	5	–	3	7	–	6
No. 24 Nebraska	4	–	4	8	–	4
Missouri	4	–	4	7	–	5
Iowa State	4	–	4	7	–	5
Kansas	3	–	5	7	–	5
Kansas State	2	–	6	5	–	6
South Division
No. 1 Texas x$#	8	–	0	13	–	0
No. 20 Texas Tech	6	–	2	9	–	3
No. 22 Oklahoma	6	–	2	8	–	4
Texas A&M	3	–	5	5	–	6
Baylor	2	–	6	5	–	6
Oklahoma State	1	–	7	4	–	7
Championship: Texas 70, Colorado 3
# – BCS National Champion; $ – BCS representative as conference champion; x – Division champion/co-champions; Rankings from AP Poll

The 2005 Oklahoma State Cowboys football team represented Oklahoma State University during the 2005 NCAA Division I-A football season. They participated as members of the Big 12 Conference in the South Division. They played their home games at Boone Pickens Stadium in Stillwater, Oklahoma. They were coached by head coach Mike Gundy.

Until 2024, this was the last time that the Cowboys had a losing season in football and became ineligible for a bowl game.

== Schedule ==
Date	Time	Opponent	Site	TV	Result	Attendance	Source
September 3	6:00 p.m.	No. 18 (I-AA) Montana State*	Boone Pickens Stadium; Stillwater, OK		W 15–10	43,857	
September 8	6:00 p.m.	at Florida Atlantic*	Dolphins Stadium; Miami Gardens, FL	ESPN2	W 23–3	16,421	
September 17	6:00 p.m.	Arkansas State*	Boone Pickens Stadium; Stillwater, OK	FSSW	W 20–10	46,817	
October 1	1:00 p.m.	Colorado	Boone Pickens Stadium; Stillwater, OK		L 0–34	47,908	
October 8	1:00 p.m.	Missouri	Boone Pickens Stadium; Stillwater, OK		L 31–38	42,511	
October 15	2:30 p.m.	at Texas A&M	Kyle Field; College Station, TX		L 23–62	78,451	
October 22	1:00 p.m.	at Iowa State	Jack Trice Stadium; Ames, IA		L 10–37	43,964	
October 29	6:00 p.m.	No. 2 Texas^{†}	Boone Pickens Stadium; Stillwater, OK	TBS	L 28–47	48,035	
November 12	1:00 p.m.	No. 13 Texas Tech	Boone Pickens Stadium; Stillwater, OK		W 24–17	40,035	
November 19	1:00 p.m.	at Baylor	Floyd Casey Stadium; Waco, TX		L 34–44	28,753	
November 26	2:30 p.m.	at Oklahoma	Gaylord Family Oklahoma Memorial Stadium; Norman, OK (Bedlam Series)	ABC	L 14–42	84,875	
*Non-conference game; ^{†}Homecoming; Rankings from AP Poll released prior to the game; All times are in Central time
