= 2005 Kansas State Wildcats football team =

American college football season

2005 Kansas State Wildcats football
- Conference: Big 12 Conference
- North
- Record: 5–6 (2–6 Big 12)
- Head coach: Bill Snyder (17th season)
- Offensive coordinator: Del Miller (9th season)
- Offensive scheme: Spread
- Defensive coordinator: Bob Elliott (4th season)
- Base defense: 4–3
- Home stadium: KSU Stadium

2005 Big 12 Conference football standings
	Conf.			Overall
Team	W		L	W		L
North Division
Colorado x	5	–	3	7	–	6
No. 24 Nebraska	4	–	4	8	–	4
Missouri	4	–	4	7	–	5
Iowa State	4	–	4	7	–	5
Kansas	3	–	5	7	–	5
Kansas State	2	–	6	5	–	6
South Division
No. 1 Texas x$#	8	–	0	13	–	0
No. 20 Texas Tech	6	–	2	9	–	3
No. 22 Oklahoma	6	–	2	8	–	4
Texas A&M	3	–	5	5	–	6
Baylor	2	–	6	5	–	6
Oklahoma State	1	–	7	4	–	7
Championship: Texas 70, Colorado 3
# – BCS National Champion; $ – BCS representative as conference champion; x – Division champion/co-champions; Rankings from AP Poll

The 2005 Kansas State Wildcats football team represented Kansas State University in the 2005 NCAA Division I-A football season. The team's head football coach was Bill Snyder. The Wildcats played their home games in KSU Stadium. The team finished the season with a win–loss record of 5–6, and a Big 12 Conference record of 2–6.

== Schedule ==
Date	Time	Opponent	Site	TV	Result	Attendance	Source
September 3	1:10 p.m.	FIU*	KSU Stadium; Manhattan, KS		W 35–21	43,611	
September 10	10:30 a.m.	at Marshall*	Joan C. Edwards Stadium; Huntington, WV	ESPN2	W 21–19	36,914	
September 24	1:10 p.m.	North Texas*	KSU Stadium; Manhattan, KS		W 54–7	46,514	
October 1	6:00 p.m.	at Oklahoma	Gaylord Family Oklahoma Memorial Stadium; Norman, OK	FSN	L 21–43	84,501	
October 8	11:10 a.m.	Kansas	KSU Stadium; Manhattan, KS (rivalry)	FSN	W 12–3	49,798	
October 15	11:00 a.m.	at No. 13 Texas Tech	Jones SBC Stadium; Lubbock, TX	ABC	L 20–59	50,813	
October 22	1:10 p.m.	Texas A&M	KSU Stadium; Manhattan, KS		L 28–30	45,915	
October 29	1:10 p.m.	Colorado^{†}	KSU Stadium; Manhattan, KS (rivalry)		L 20–23	43,890	
November 5	1:00 p.m.	at Iowa State	Jack Trice Stadium; Ames, IA (rivalry)		L 17–45	42,686	
November 12	1:05 p.m.	at Nebraska	Memorial Stadium; Lincoln, NE (rivalry)		L 25–27	77,761	
November 19	1:10 p.m.	Missouri	KSU Stadium; Manhattan, KS		W 36–28	46,039	
*Non-conference game; ^{†}Homecoming; Rankings from AP Poll released prior to the game; All times are in Central time

== Game summaries ==
=== FIU ===
The Wildcats were favored by 10 points going into the game.

Kansas State running back Thomas Clayton ran for 177 yards and two touchdowns to lead Kansas State to its 16th straight win in a season opener, a 35–21 over Florida International in the Golden Panthers' first game as a full member of the Football Bowl Subdivision.

Kansas State Quarterback Allen Webb threw for 161 yards and two touchdowns for the Wildcats, but also lost a fumble and threw one interception.

	1	2	3	4	Total
FIU	0	7	14	0	21
Kansas State	6	7	15	7	35

=== Marshall ===
Kansas State was favored by 12 points going into the game.

Kansas State edged out Marshall by a score of 21–19. Marshall had the option of kicking a field goal with 9 seconds to go in the game, but decided to run one more play. This would be a decision they would soon regret. Marshall quarterback Jimmy Skinner, subbed in for an injured Bernie Morris, threw an interception to end the game and seal a victory for the Wildcats. Kansas State quarterback threw two touchdowns for the second week in a row, one to running back Thomas Clayton, who ran for another score. Kansas State beat Marshall at home, the Thundering Herd's 8th home loss since 1991.

	1	2	3	4	Total
Kansas State	14	7	0	0	21
Marshall	10	3	0	6	19

=== North Texas ===
The Wildcats were favored by 13 points going into the game.

Kansas State got a great game out of back up running back Parrish Fisher, who filled in for suspended Thomas Clayton. Clayton was benched for the game by Head Coach Bill Snyder for charges of aggravated battery involving a campus parking attendant. Fisher ran for 169 yards and contributed to school-record of 658 yard gained. Fisher was the first freshman in school history to run for 100 yards in a game. Quarterback Allen Webb was 10–12 for 256 yards and two touchdowns. North Texas earned just 161 yards.

	1	2	3	4	Total
North Texas	0	0	0	7	7
Kansas State	3	28	7	16	54

=== Oklahoma ===
The Sooners were favored by 14 points going into the game.

Oklahoma running back Adrian Peterson ran for 51 yards before leaving the game with an injury. His absence did not stop OU for rolling over Kansas State 43–21. OU played the game unranked for the first time since 1999. Kansas State attempted to punt in the first quarter with punter Tim Reyer still on the sidelines. The punt went into the back of the endzone for a safety. Jordy Nelson scored on a 73-yard TD catch. Thomas Clayton started and had 8 yards on 12 carries. Allen Webb threw for 177 yards and two scores.

During the second quarter of the game, a nearby bomb exploded that was heard at the game.

	1	2	3	4	Total
Kansas State	0	0	15	6	21
Oklahoma	9	10	14	10	43

=== Kansas ===
The Wildcats were favored by 3 going into the game.

Kansas State back-up Quarterback Allan Evridge threw a fourth quarter touchdown to Jordy Nelson to ensure a victory for the Wildcats. It was the 12th time in 13 years K-State beat Kansas. Kansas State had more penalty yards than offensive yards in a what turned out to be a sloppy game. Kansas could only manage a field goal against Kansas State. Kansas hadn't scored a touchdown since 1999 in Manhattan, a stretch of three consecutive games.

	1	2	3	4	Total
Kansas	0	3	0	0	3
Kansas State	0	0	3	9	12

=== Texas Tech ===
The Red Raiders were favored by 10 going into the game.

Texas Tech quarterback Cody Hodges threw for 643 yards to lead number 13 Texas Tech over an overmatched Kansas State team in Lubbock, Texas. It was Texas Tech's best start to a season since 1998. Hodges finished with 44 of 65, with 5 touchdowns and two interceptions. Kansas State made it difficult on itself turning the ball over on three of its first four possessions in the third quarter. Dwayne Slay made a vicious hit on K-State quarterback Allan Everidge on a rushing play many fans will not soon forget.

	1	2	3	4	Total
Kansas State	3	10	7	0	20
#13 Texas Tech	3	14	28	14	59

=== Texas A&M ===
The Aggies were favored by 5 points going into the game. Texas A&M quarterback Reggie McNeal ran for 119 yards and a touchdown as well as threw for another in a win over Kansas State. Kansas State lost its fifth straight game against Texas A&M and its sixth straight loss against a Big 12 South team. The Wildcats had not beaten a Big 12 South team since their 35–7 victory over then-No. 1 Oklahoma in the 2003 conference Big 12 Championship game. K-State quarterback Allan Everidge threw three touchdown passes, but Kansas State could not recover an onside kick late in the fourth quarter. Kansas State ran for only 27 yards in the game. They were also handicapped by Yamon Figurs' four dropped catches.

	1	2	3	4	Total
Texas A&M	14	2	7	7	30
Kansas State	0	8	0	20	28

=== Colorado ===
The Buffaloes were favored by 11 points going into the game.

Buffaloes kicker Mason Crosby kicked a 50-yard field goal with 6 seconds remaining in the game to beat Kansas State. The victory gave Colorado the lead in the Big 12 North race, a race which Colorado would eventually end up winning. The loss was their third straight and their second consecutive home loss, the first time that had happened since 1989, the first season for head coach Bill Snyder.

	1	2	3	4	Total
Colorado	7	13	0	3	23
Kansas State	3	7	10	0	20

=== Iowa State ===
The Cyclones were favored by 4 points going into the game.

Iowa State quarterback Bret Meyer threw three touchdowns and running back Stevie Hicks ran for 149 yards and a TD in a convincing win in Ames. Kansas State lost its fourth straight game.

	1	2	3	4	Total
Kansas State	0	10	7	0	17
Iowa State	17	0	21	7	45

=== Nebraska ===
The Huskers were favored by 1 point going into the game.

Husker kicker Jordan Congdon kicked a 40-yard field goal with just over one minute to play to seal a victory for The Big Red. Kansas State Quarterback Allan Evridge ran for 138 yards and two scores. Kansas State also scored two safeties.

	1	2	3	4	Total
Kansas State	6	6	10	3	25
Nebraska	7	10	7	3	27

=== Missouri ===
The Wildcats were favored by 2 points going into the game.

Kansas State players refused to let head coach Bill Snyder finish his career (as it later turned out, his first tenure with the Wildcats) on a six-game losing streak. With K-State up by one point with a minute and a half to play in the fourth quarter, Wildcat lineback Brandon Archer intercepted a pass from Missouri quarterback Brad Smith and returned it for 45 yards six points. It was a play eerily similar to the interception by former Wildcat linebacker Ted Simms in the 2003 Big Championship game against Jason White. Archer's interception made sure Snyder's last game would be one to remember. Snyder had announced his retirement the Wednesday before the Saturday game against Missouri. The Wildcats had not lost to Missouri since 1992. Snyder came out to speak to the crowd after going into the locker room to address his players. The university would later rename the stadium in his name. Snyder returned to K-State in 2009 and coached ten seasons, becoming the third coach to work in a stadium named after him, following Shug Jordan at Auburn and Bear Bryant at Alabama.

	1	2	3	4	Total
Missouri	7	14	7	0	28
Kansas State	14	0	7	15	36

== Roster ==
2005 Kansas State Wildcats football team roster
Players			Coaches
Offense: Pos. / # / Name / Class; WR / 27 / Jordy Nelson / So	Defense: Pos. / # / Name / Class	Special teams: Pos. / # / Name / Class	Head coach: Bill Snyder; Coordinators/assistant coaches: Del Miller – co-Offensive Coordinator & quarterbacks; Greg Peterson – co-Offensive Coordinator & wide receivers; Michael Smith – Running backs; Matt Miller – Tight ends; Bob Stanley – Offensive line; Bob Elliot – Defensive Coordinator & secondary; Mo Latimore – interior Defensive line; Joe Bob Clements – Defensive end; Chris Cosh – linebackers; Legend: (C) Team captain; (S) Suspended; (I) Ineligible; Injured; Redshirt

== Statistics ==
=== Scores by quarter ===
	1	2	3	4	Total
K-State	49	83	81	76	289
Opponents	74	76	98	57	305
