= 2005 Baylor Bears football team =

American college football season

2005 Baylor Bears football
- Conference: Big 12 Conference
- South Division
- Record: 5–6 (2–6 Big 12)
- Head coach: Guy Morriss (3rd season)
- Offensive coordinator: Brent Pease (3rd season)
- Offensive scheme: Pro set
- Defensive coordinator: Bill Bradley (2nd season)
- Base defense: 4–2
- Home stadium: Floyd Casey Stadium

2005 Big 12 Conference football standings
	Conf.			Overall
Team	W		L	W		L
North Division
Colorado x	5	–	3	7	–	6
No. 24 Nebraska	4	–	4	8	–	4
Missouri	4	–	4	7	–	5
Iowa State	4	–	4	7	–	5
Kansas	3	–	5	7	–	5
Kansas State	2	–	6	5	–	6
South Division
No. 1 Texas x$#	8	–	0	13	–	0
No. 20 Texas Tech	6	–	2	9	–	3
No. 22 Oklahoma	6	–	2	8	–	4
Texas A&M	3	–	5	5	–	6
Baylor	2	–	6	5	–	6
Oklahoma State	1	–	7	4	–	7
Championship: Texas 70, Colorado 3
# – BCS National Champion; $ – BCS representative as conference champion; x – Division champion/co-champions; Rankings from AP Poll

The 2005 Baylor Bears football team (variously "Baylor", "BU", or the "Bears") represented Baylor University in the 2005 NCAA Division I-A football season. They were represented in the Big 12 Conference in the South Division. They played their home games at Floyd Casey Stadium in Waco, Texas. They were coached by head coach Guy Morriss.

== Schedule ==
Date	Time	Opponent	Site	TV	Result	Attendance	Source
September 3	7:00 p.m.	at SMU*	Gerald J. Ford Stadium; University Park, TX		W 28-23	29,538	
September 10	6:00 p.m.	Samford*	Floyd Casey Stadium; Waco, TX		W 48–14	36,575	
September 17	2:00 p.m.	at Army*	Michie Stadium; West Point, NY	ESPNC	W 20–10	31,357	
October 1	6:00 p.m.	at Texas A&M	Kyle Field; College Station, TX (Battle of the Brazos)	FSN	L 13–16 ^{OT}	79,280	
October 8	1:00 p.m.	at Iowa State	Jack Trice Stadium; Ames, IA		W 23–13	45,992	
October 15	1:00 p.m.	Nebraska	Floyd Casey Stadium; Waco, TX	PPV	L 14–23	40,857	
October 22	6:00 p.m.	at Oklahoma	Gaylord Family Oklahoma Memorial Stadium; Norman, OK	FSN	L 30–37 ^{OT}	83,456	
October 29	11:30 a.m.	No. 16 Texas Tech^{†}	Floyd Casey Stadium; Waco, TX (rivalry)	FSN	L 0–28	43,525	
November 5	6:00 p.m.	No. 2 Texas	Floyd Casey Stadium; Waco, TX (rivalry)	FSN	L 0–62	44,783	
November 12	1:00 p.m.	at Missouri	Faurot Field; Columbia, MO		L 16–31	46,425	
November 19	1:00 p.m.	Oklahoma State	Floyd Casey Stadium; Waco, TX		W 44–34	28,753	
*Non-conference game; ^{†}Homecoming; Rankings from AP Poll released prior to the game; All times are in Central time
