= 2005 Big 12 Championship Game =

2005 Dr Pepper Big 12 Championship Game
- Conference Championship
- 2005 Big 12 Championship game logo
Texas Longhorns	Colorado Buffaloes
(11–0)	(7–4)
70	3
Head coach: Mack Brown	Head coach: Gary Barnett
AP / Coaches / BCS; 2 / 2 / 2	AP / Coaches / BCS; NR / NR / NR
	1	2	3	4	Total
Texas	14	28	28	0	70
Colorado	0	3	0	0	3
- Date: December 3, 2005
- Season: 2005
- Stadium: Reliant Stadium
- Location: Houston, Texas
- MVP: QB Vince Young
- Favorite: Texas by 27
- Referee: Tom Walker
- Attendance: 71,107

United States TV coverage
- Network: ABC
- Announcers: Brad Nessler play-by-play, Bob Griese analyst, & Lynn Swann reporter

2005 Big 12 Conference football standings
	Conf.			Overall
Team	W		L	W		L
North Division
Colorado x	5	–	3	7	–	6
No. 24 Nebraska	4	–	4	8	–	4
Missouri	4	–	4	7	–	5
Iowa State	4	–	4	7	–	5
Kansas	3	–	5	7	–	5
Kansas State	2	–	6	5	–	6
South Division
No. 1 Texas x$#	8	–	0	13	–	0
No. 20 Texas Tech	6	–	2	9	–	3
No. 22 Oklahoma	6	–	2	8	–	4
Texas A&M	3	–	5	5	–	6
Baylor	2	–	6	5	–	6
Oklahoma State	1	–	7	4	–	7
Championship: Texas 70, Colorado 3
# – BCS National Champion; $ – BCS representative as conference champion; x – Division champion/co-champions; Rankings from AP Poll

The 2005 Dr Pepper Big 12 Championship Game was held at Reliant Stadium on December 3, 2005. The game saw the Big 12 South champions Texas Longhorns take on the Colorado Buffaloes, winners of the Big 12 North. Texas, undefeated and at #2 in the BCS standings, was looking to travel to the national championship.

Texas defeated Colorado, 70–3. The win was the 8th largest margin of victory in Texas football history, and sent the Longhorns to the BCS title game in Pasadena, where they defeated USC 41–38. The game would also be the last for Colorado head coach Gary Barnett, who was replaced on December 15 by Dan Hawkins. Colorado would go on to lose 19–10 to Clemson in the Champs Sports Bowl.

== Scoring summary ==
=== 1st Quarter ===
- 09:44 UT – Melton, Henry 1 yd run (Pino, David kick)
- 05:59 UT – Charles, Jamaal 3 yd pass from Young, Vince (Pino, David kick)

=== 2nd Quarter ===
- 14:48 CU – Crosby, Mason 25 yd FG
- 12:00 UT – Young, Vince 2 yd run (Pino, David kick)
- 11:37 UT – Sweed, Limas 31 yd pass from Young, Vince (Pino, David kick)
- 07:20 UT – Thomas, David 8 yd pass from Young, Vince (Pino, David kick)
- 00:25 UT – Charles, Jamaal 2 yd run (Pino, David kick)

=== 3rd Quarter ===
- 11:26 UT – Young, Selvin 4 yd run (Pino, David kick)
- 10:21 UT – Foster, Brandon 0 yd blocked punt return (Pino, David kick)
- 09:59 UT – Charles, Jamaal 26 yd run (Pino, David kick)
- 07:36 UT – Melton, Henry 1 yd run (Pino, David kick)
