= 2005 Kansas Jayhawks football team =

American college football season

2005 Kansas Jayhawks football

Fort Worth Bowl champion

Fort Worth Bowl, W 42–13 vs. Houston
- Conference: Big 12 Conference
- North
- Record: 7–5 (3–5 Big 12)
- Head coach: Mark Mangino (4th season)
- Offensive coordinator: Nick Quartaro (4th season)
- Defensive coordinator: Bill Young (4th season)
- Home stadium: Memorial Stadium (Capacity: 50,071)

2005 Big 12 Conference football standings
	Conf.			Overall
Team	W		L	W		L
North Division
Colorado x	5	–	3	7	–	6
No. 24 Nebraska	4	–	4	8	–	4
Missouri	4	–	4	7	–	5
Iowa State	4	–	4	7	–	5
Kansas	3	–	5	7	–	5
Kansas State	2	–	6	5	–	6
South Division
No. 1 Texas x$#	8	–	0	13	–	0
No. 20 Texas Tech	6	–	2	9	–	3
No. 22 Oklahoma	6	–	2	8	–	4
Texas A&M	3	–	5	5	–	6
Baylor	2	–	6	5	–	6
Oklahoma State	1	–	7	4	–	7
Championship: Texas 70, Colorado 3
# – BCS National Champion; $ – BCS representative as conference champion; x – Division champion/co-champions; Rankings from AP Poll

The 2005 Kansas Jayhawks football team played in the Big 12 Conference representing the University of Kansas. The Jayhawks, members of the Big 12 Conference, were coached by Mark Mangino in his fourth season as head coach. The Jayhawks defeated Nebraska for the first time in 37 years after beating them 40–15. They finished the regular season 6–5 becoming eligible for a bowl game for the second time in three seasons.

The Jayhawks won the Fort Worth Bowl, defeating the Houston Cougars, 42–13, which was their first bowl game victory in 10 years.

== Schedule ==
Date	Time	Opponent	Site	TV	Result	Attendance
September 3	6:00 p.m.	Florida Atlantic*	Memorial Stadium; Lawrence, Kansas	SFS	W 30–19	40,930
September 10	6:00 p.m.	No. 25 (I-AA) Appalachian State*	Memorial Stadium; Lawrence, Kansas		W 36–8	37,070
September 17	6:00 p.m.	Louisiana Tech*	Memorial Stadium; Lawrence, Kansas	FCS	W 34–14	41,237
October 1	6:00 p.m.	at No. 13 Texas Tech	Jones SBC Stadium; Lubbock, Texas		L 17–30	52,601
October 8	11:00 a.m.	at Kansas State	KSU Stadium; Manhattan, Kansas (Sunflower Showdown)	FSN	L 3–12	49,798
October 15	6:00 p.m.	vs. Oklahoma	Arrowhead Stadium; Kansas City, Missouri	TBS	L 3–19	54,109
October 22	6:00 p.m.	at Colorado	Folsom Field; Boulder, Colorado	FSN PPV	L 13–44	48,025
October 29	12:00 p.m.	Missouri	Memorial Stadium; Lawrence, Kansas (rivalry)	FSN	W 13–3	48,238
November 5	12:00 p.m.	Nebraska	Memorial Stadium; Lawrence, Kansas (rivalry)		W 40–15	51,750
November 12	2:30 p.m.	at No. 2 Texas	Darrell K Royal–Texas Memorial Stadium; Austin, Texas	ABC	L 14–66	83,696
November 26	11:30 a.m.	Iowa State	Memorial Stadium; Lawrence, Kansas	FSN	W 24–21 ^{OT}	42,826
December 23	8:00 p.m.	vs. Houston	Amon G. Carter Stadium; Fort Worth, Texas (Fort Worth Bowl)	ESPN	W 42–13	33,505
*Non-conference game; Rankings from AP Poll released prior to the game; All times are in Central time
