= 2005 Missouri Tigers football team =

American college football season

2005 Missouri Tigers football

Independence Bowl champion

Independence Bowl, W 38–31 vs. South Carolina
- Conference: Big 12 Conference
- North Division
- Record: 7–5 (4–4 Big 12)
- Head coach: Gary Pinkel (5th season)
- Offensive coordinator: Dave Christensen (5th season)
- Offensive scheme: Spread
- Defensive coordinator: Matt Eberflus (5th season)
- Base defense: 4–3
- Home stadium: Faurot Field

2005 Big 12 Conference football standings
	Conf.			Overall
Team	W		L	W		L
North Division
Colorado x	5	–	3	7	–	6
No. 24 Nebraska	4	–	4	8	–	4
Missouri	4	–	4	7	–	5
Iowa State	4	–	4	7	–	5
Kansas	3	–	5	7	–	5
Kansas State	2	–	6	5	–	6
South Division
No. 1 Texas x$#	8	–	0	13	–	0
No. 20 Texas Tech	6	–	2	9	–	3
No. 22 Oklahoma	6	–	2	8	–	4
Texas A&M	3	–	5	5	–	6
Baylor	2	–	6	5	–	6
Oklahoma State	1	–	7	4	–	7
Championship: Texas 70, Colorado 3
# – BCS National Champion; $ – BCS representative as conference champion; x – Division champion/co-champions; Rankings from AP Poll

The 2005 Missouri Tigers football team represented the University of Missouri during the 2005 NCAA Division I-A football season. The team finished with a 7–5 record, including 4–4 in Big 12 Conference play. The season culminated with a win over South Carolina in the Independence Bowl. The team led by head coach Gary Pinkel.

== Schedule ==
Date	Time	Opponent	Site	TV	Result	Attendance
September 3	11:00 am	vs. Arkansas State*	Arrowhead Stadium; Kansas City, Missouri		W 44–17	32,906
September 10	6:00 pm	New Mexico*	Faurot Field; Columbia, Missouri	KRCG 13	L 35–45	50,701
September 17	1:00 pm	Troy*	Faurot Field; Columbia, Missouri		W 52–21	50,167
October 1	11:00 am	No. 2 Texas	Faurot Field; Columbia, Missouri	ABC	L 20–51	57,231
October 8	1:00 pm	at Oklahoma State	Boone Pickens Stadium; Stillwater, Oklahoma		W 38–31	42,511
October 15	1:00 pm	Iowa State^{†}	Faurot Field; Columbia, Missouri (Battle for the Telephone Trophy)		W 27–24 ^{OT}	55,016
October 22	11:30 am	Nebraska	Faurot Field; Columbia, Missouri (rivalry)	FSN	W 41–24	60,641
October 29	12:00 pm	at Kansas	Memorial Stadium; Lawrence, Kansas (Border War)		L 3–13	48,238
November 5	2:30 pm	at No. 24 Colorado	Folsom Field; Boulder, Colorado	ABC	L 12–41	49,196
November 12	1:00 pm	Baylor	Faurot Field; Columbia, Missouri		W 31–16	46,425
November 19	1:10 pm	at Kansas State	KSU Stadium; Manhattan, Kansas		L 28–36	46,039
December 30	2:30 pm	vs. South Carolina*	Independence Stadium; Shreveport, Louisiana (Independence Bowl)	ESPN	W 38–31	41,332
*Non-conference game; ^{†}Homecoming; Rankings from Coaches' Poll released prior to the game; All times are in Central time
