= 2005 Texas A&M Aggies football team =

American college football season

2005 Texas A&M Aggies football
- Conference: Big 12 Conference
- South Division
- Record: 5–6 (3–5 Big 12)
- Head coach: Dennis Franchione (3rd season)
- Offensive coordinator: Les Koenning (3rd season)
- Offensive scheme: Multiple
- Defensive coordinator: Carl Torbush (3rd season)
- Base defense: 4–2–5
- Home stadium: Kyle Field

2005 Big 12 Conference football standings
	Conf.			Overall
Team	W		L	W		L
North Division
Colorado x	5	–	3	7	–	6
No. 24 Nebraska	4	–	4	8	–	4
Missouri	4	–	4	7	–	5
Iowa State	4	–	4	7	–	5
Kansas	3	–	5	7	–	5
Kansas State	2	–	6	5	–	6
South Division
No. 1 Texas x$#	8	–	0	13	–	0
No. 20 Texas Tech	6	–	2	9	–	3
No. 22 Oklahoma	6	–	2	8	–	4
Texas A&M	3	–	5	5	–	6
Baylor	2	–	6	5	–	6
Oklahoma State	1	–	7	4	–	7
Championship: Texas 70, Colorado 3
# – BCS National Champion; $ – BCS representative as conference champion; x – Division champion/co-champions; Rankings from AP Poll

The 2005 Texas A&M Aggies football team completed the season with a 5–6 record. The Aggies had a regular season Big 12 record of 3–5.

Despite being ranked #17 in preseason polls, the 2005 Aggie defense ranked 107th nationally (out of 119 NCAA Division I-A teams) and allowed 443.8 yards per game. This prompted head coach Dennis Franchione to dismiss defensive coordinator Carl Torbush. Franchione then hired former Western Michigan head coach Gary Darnell to replace Torbush.

== Schedule ==
Date	Time	Opponent	Rank	Site	TV	Result	Attendance
September 3	7:00 pm	at Clemson*	No. 17	Memorial Stadium; Clemson, SC	ABC	L 24–25	79,917
September 17	11:30 am	SMU*		Kyle Field; College Station, TX	FSN	W 66–8	75,128
September 22	7:30 pm	No. 14 (I-AA) Texas State*		Kyle Field; College Station, TX	FSN	W 44–31	72,741
October 1	11:30 am	Baylor		Kyle Field; College Station, TX (Battle of the Brazos)	FSN	W 16–13 ^{OT}	79,280
October 8	6:00 pm	at Colorado		Folsom Field; Boulder, CO	FSN	L 20–41	50,686
October 15	2:30 pm	Oklahoma State		Kyle Field; College Station, TX		W 62–23	78,451
October 22	1:10 pm	at Kansas State		KSU Stadium; Manhattan, KS		W 30–28	45,915
October 29	2:30 pm	Iowa State		Kyle Field; College Station, TX	ABC	L 14–42	86,172
November 5	6:00 pm	at No. 16 Texas Tech		Jones SBC Stadium; Lubbock, TX (rivalry)	FSN	L 17–56	55,755
November 12	11:00 am	at Oklahoma		Gaylord Family Oklahoma Memorial Stadium; Norman, OK	ABC	L 30–36	84,943
November 25	11:00 am	No. 2 Texas		Kyle Field; College Station, TX (rivalry)	ABC	L 29–40	86,617
*Non-conference game; Rankings from AP Poll released prior to the game; All times are in Central time

== Game summaries ==
=== Clemson ===
	1	2	3	4	Total
Texas A&M	3	7	7	7	24
Clemson	10	6	3	6	25

=== Southern Methodist ===
	1	2	3	4	Total
Southern Methodist	6	2	0	0	8
Texas A&M	7	17	28	14	66

=== Texas State ===
	1	2	3	4	Total
Texas State	0	17	0	14	31
Texas A&M	13	14	14	3	44

This game was originally scheduled for Saturday, September 24, but was moved up to Thursday, September 22, due to the threat of Hurricane Rita. Out of town fans were encouraged to not travel to the game so actual attendance was about half of the reported 72,741. The Texas A&M campus was already hosting evacuees from Hurricane Katrina and many more people from the Texas Gulf Coast were coming to or through College Station before Hurricane Rita made landfall.

=== Baylor ===
	1	2	3	4	OT	Total
Baylor	3	0	7	0	3	13
Texas A&M	7	0	0	3	6	16

=== Colorado ===
	1	2	3	4	Total
Texas A&M	0	6	0	14	20
Colorado	21	10	10	0	41

=== Oklahoma State ===
	1	2	3	4	Total
Oklahoma State	0	17	0	6	23
Texas A&M	20	7	14	21	62

=== Kansas State ===
	1	2	3	4	Total
Texas A&M	14	2	7	7	30
Kansas State	0	8	0	20	28

=== Iowa State ===
	1	2	3	4	Total
Iowa State	7	7	14	14	42
Texas A&M	7	0	0	7	14

=== Texas Tech ===
	1	2	3	4	Total
Texas A&M	3	7	0	7	17
Texas Tech	14	0	21	21	56

=== Oklahoma ===
	1	2	3	4	Total
Texas A&M	7	7	10	6	30
Oklahoma	28	0	2	6	36

=== Texas ===
	1	2	3	4	Total
Texas	14	7	13	6	40
Texas A&M	9	6	14	0	29
