= Thaddaeus Washington =

American gridiron football player (born 1983)

Profile
- Position: Linebacker

Personal information
- Born: November 10, 1983 (age 42); New Orleans, Louisiana
- Listed height: 5 ft 11 in (1.80 m)
- Listed weight: 245 lb (111 kg)

Career information
- High school: John Ehret (Marrero, Louisiana)
- College: Colorado
- NFL draft: 2007: undrafted

Career history
- Buffalo Bills (2007)*; Edmonton Eskimos (2008-2009)
- * Offseason or practice squad member only

Awards and highlights
- Second-team All-Big 12 (2005)

Thaddaeus Washington (born November 10, 1983, in New Orleans, Louisiana) is a gridiron football linebacker for the Edmonton Eskimos of the Canadian Football League. He was originally signed by the Buffalo Bills as an undrafted free agent in 2007. He played college football at Colorado.

== Professional career ==
Washington signed with the Edmonton Eskimos in March 2008.
