= Joe Klopfenstein =

American football player (born 1983)

No. 82, 87, 88
- Position: Tight end

Personal information
- Born: November 9, 1983 (age 42); Denver, Colorado, U.S.
- Listed height: 6 ft 5 in (1.96 m)
- Listed weight: 262 lb (119 kg)

Career information
- High school: Grandview (Aurora, Colorado)
- College: Colorado
- NFL draft: 2006: 2nd round, 46th overall pick

Career history
- St. Louis Rams (2006–2008); Buffalo Bills (2009–2010)

Awards and highlights
- First-team All-Big 12 (2005); Second-team All-Big 12 (2004)

Career NFL statistics
- Receptions: 34
- Receiving yards: 397
- Receiving touchdowns: 2
- Stats at Pro Football Reference

Joseph Wayne Klopfenstein (born November 9, 1983) is an American former professional football player who was a tight end in the National Football League (NFL). He was selected by the St. Louis Rams in the second round of the 2006 NFL draft. He played college football for the Colorado Buffaloes.

== Early life ==
He played high school football at Grandview High School in Aurora, Colorado. Klopfenstein received First-team All-State and All-Grand Peaks League honors as a defensive end. He was a Second-team All-GPL linebacker as a junior and honorable mention during his sophomore campaign. He was a slotback during his senior year, rushing 16 times for 103 yards and catching 10 passes for 130 yards and a touchdown. He had Added 53 tackles on defense (21 solos), with 14 stops for losses including eight quarterback sacks, seven pressures and three passes broken up. He had 50 tackles as a junior (12 TFL, seven sacks), five pressures and a forced fumble. As a sophomore, he had 45 tackles with four sacks, a forced fumble and a recovery. An all-around player, he played offensive guard as sophomore and junior, and quarterback as a freshman and handled place-kicks on occasion and kicked off as well. He lettered once in baseball (first baseman) and in track (ran the 200 meters and relays as a senior) and was an Honor Roll student.

== College career ==
Klopfenstein played college football at the Colorado for the Buffaloes, where he recorded 1,076 yards receiving and 14 touchdowns. He appeared in seven games as a true freshman in 2002 at Colorado, but did not catch any passes. The following year, Klopfenstein earned All-Big 12 Conference (honorable mention), as he started 10 games. He finished with 190 yards and four touchdowns on 20 receptions (9.5 avg) as a sophomore. In 2004, he was a Second-team All-Big 12 pick, starting 12 times for the Buffs. Klopfenstein ranked third on the team with 33 catches for 418 yards (12.7 avg) and five touchdowns. Klopfenstein was First-team All-Big 12 status as a senior. He caught 33 passes for 468 yards (14.5 avg) and four scores. He majored in sociology.

== Professional career ==
Pre-draft measurables
Height	Weight	Arm length	Hand span	40-yard dash	10-yard split	20-yard split	20-yard shuttle	Three-cone drill	Vertical jump	Broad jump	Bench press
6 ft 5 3/4 in (1.97 m)	255 lb (116 kg)	33 in (0.84 m)	10 1/8 in (0.26 m)	4.62 s	1.58 s	2.67 s	4.21 s	7.39 s	36 in (0.91 m)	9 ft 4 in (2.84 m)	27 reps
All values from NFL Combine

=== St. Louis Rams ===
The St. Louis Rams selected Klopfenstein in the second round (46th overall) in the 2006 NFL draft. On July 26, 2006, he signed a 4-year $2.91 million contract with the Rams. In his rookie year, he made 20 receptions for 226 yards and one touchdown versus the Detroit Lions on October 1, 2006. In his second season with the Rams, Klopfenstein started in 11 games catching two passes for 37 yards. He caught a career-long 36-yard touchdown pass at the Arizona Cardinals on December 30, 2007.

The Rams waived Klopfenstein on September 1, 2009.

=== Buffalo Bills ===
Klopfenstein was signed by the Buffalo Bills on November 17. He was waived on November 28 and later re-signed on December 8. He was waived again on December 16 when the team claimed guard Richie Incognito. On December 18, Klopenstein was re-signed again after Kendall Simmons was placed on injured reserve.

On October 6, 2010, Klopfenstein was cut from injured reserve by the Bills.

In 4 NFL seasons, Klopfenstein had 34 career receptions for 397 yards (11.7 average) and 2 touchdowns.
