= Jay Moore =

American football player (born 1983)

No. 44
- Position: Defensive end

Personal information
- Born: August 16, 1983 (age 43); Elkhorn, Nebraska, U.S.
- Listed height: 6 ft 4 in (1.93 m)
- Listed weight: 256 lb (116 kg)

Career information
- High school: Elkhorn (NE)
- College: Nebraska
- NFL draft: 2007: 4th round, 104th overall pick

Career history
- San Francisco 49ers (2007–2008); St. Louis Rams (2009)*; Tennessee Titans (2010)*; Omaha Nighthawks (2010–2012)
- * Offseason or practice squad member only

Awards and highlights
- Second-team All-Big 12 (2006)

Jay Moore (born August 16, 1983) is an American former professional football defensive end. He was selected by the San Francisco 49ers in the fourth round in the 2007 NFL draft. He played college football for the Nebraska Cornhuskers.

He was also a member of the St. Louis Rams, Tennessee Titans, and Omaha Nighthawks.

== Early life ==
Moore attended Elkhorn High School in Elkhorn, Nebraska. In High School Moore played tailback and linebacker. He was a member of the Omaha World-Herald's Super Six team, Moore registered 92 carries for 822 yards (8.9 avg) and scored 16 touchdowns in five games. He rushed for 1,742 yards and 31 touchdowns (8.8 avg) in 2000

== College career ==
In 37 games at the University of Nebraska in Lincoln of which he played in, 30 were games that he was a starter. He had 103 tackles, 12 sacks, 8 passes defensed, four forced fumbles, three fumble recoveries, and one interception. His 38 career tackles behind the line of scrimmage tied Mike Rucker (1995–99) for sixth on the University of Nebraska's all-time record list.

== Professional career ==
Pre-draft measurables
Height	Weight	40-yard dash	10-yard split	20-yard split	20-yard shuttle	Three-cone drill	Vertical jump	Broad jump	Bench press
6 ft 4 3/4 in (1.95 m)	274 lb (124 kg)	4.74 s	1.59 s	2.70 s	4.35 s	7.19 s	34 in (0.86 m)	9 ft 10 in (3.00 m)	26 reps
40 (and splits) from Nebraska Pro Day, all others from NFL Combine.

=== San Francisco 49ers ===
On September 1, 2007, Moore was placed on the San Francisco 49ers' injured reserve list after suffering a severe high-ankle sprain in the final game of the pre-season.

Moore is recovered from the high ankle sprain that cost him his whole rookie year.

=== St. Louis Rams ===
Moore was signed to the St. Louis Rams practice squad on September 30, 2009.

=== Tennessee Titans ===
After his contract with the Rams expired at the end of the season, Moore signed a future contract with the Tennessee Titans on January 13, 2010. He was cut on July 9, 2010.

=== Dallas Cowboys ===
Moore agreed to sign with Dallas on July 23, 2010. However, the next day, he decided that he did not want to play football and backed out of the deal. He was never officially signed.

== Post-football career ==
Moore is current a radio host for Hail Varsity Radio, a sports talk show aired on several AM radio stations in Nebraska.
