= Trenni Casey =

American sports anchor and reporter

- Born: April 30, 1977 (age 49); Wisconsin, U.S.
- Education: Marquette University
- Occupations: Sports anchor and reporter

Trenni Casey (née Kusnierek; born April 30, 1977) is an American sports anchor and reporter for NBC Sports Boston.

== Early life ==
Casey is a graduate of Muskego High School and a 1999 journalism graduate of Marquette University.

She appeared as herself on the TV show Change of Heart around 1999.

== Career ==
Casey has previously worked at WDJT-TV (2001-2002), FSN Pittsburgh (2003-2007), ABC Sports (2005), and FSN Wisconsin (2008), and as a reporter and former studio host for the MLB Network. She has also done some work for the Big Ten Network and the NFL Network. For one season, she worked with Kevin Harlan and Rich Gannon as a sideline reporter for Green Bay Packers preseason.

From 2011 to 2013, Casey worked for WTMJ (AM) and ESPN 540 in Milwaukee as a sports reporter and talk show host.

Casey was hired by NBC Sports to work as a curling reporter during the 2014 and 2018 Winter Olympics, and she also covered tennis for NBC Sports at the 2016 and 2020 Summer Olympics.

Casey has also worked at WEEI-FM in Boston as a weekend and substitute program host.

Casey falsely accused a group of West Point cadets of flashing a "white power" symbol during the Army–Navy Game in 2019, and she demanded their immediate expulsion. Casey refused to apologize after a subsequent investigation quickly exonerated the cadets, who were in fact playing the well-known "circle game".
