= Gridiron Classic =

Gridiron Classic may refer to one of two American football post-season games:

- Gridiron Classic (1999–2005), an all-star game held in Florida
- Gridiron Classic (2006–2009), an FCS bowl game between champions of the Northeast Conference and Pioneer Football League

See also

- Dixie Gridiron Classic
- Magnolia Gridiron All-Star Classic
