= 2006 NCAA football bowl games =

In college football, 2006 NCAA football bowl games may refer to:

- 2005–06 NCAA football bowl games, for games played in January 2006 as part of the 2005 season
- 2006–07 NCAA football bowl games, for games played in December 2006 as part of the 2006 season
