= 2010–11 NCAA football bowl games =

College football postseason game series

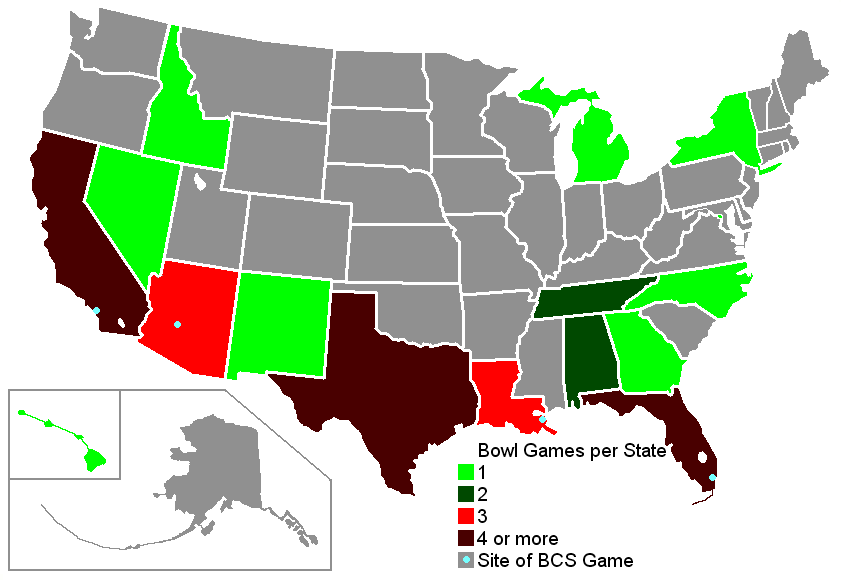
- Bowl sites by state
- Season: 2010
- Regular season: September 2, 2010 – December 11, 2010
- Number of bowls: 35
- All-star games: 5
- Bowl games: December 18, 2010 – January 10, 2011 (team-competitive)
- National Championship: 2011 BCS National Championship
- Location of Championship: University of Phoenix Stadium; Glendale, Arizona
- Champions: Auburn Tigers
- Bowl Challenge Cup winner: Mountain West Conference
Bowl record by conference
Conference	Bowls	Record	Final AP poll
SEC	10	5–5 (0.500)	6
ACC	9	4–5 (0.444)	4
Big 12	8	3–5 (0.375)	5
Big Ten	8	3–5 (0.375)	4
Big East	6	4–2 (0.667)	2
Conference USA	6	2–4 (0.333)	0
Mountain West	5	4–1 (0.800)	2
Pac-10	4	2–2 (0.500)	2
MAC	4	2–2 (0.500)	0
WAC	4	2–2 (0.500)	3
Sun Belt	3	2–1 (0.667)	0
Independents	3	2–1 (0.667)	0

The 2010–11 NCAA football bowl games concluded the 2010 NCAA Division I FBS football season and included 35 team-competitive bowl games and four all-star games. The games began play with three bowls on December 18, 2010 and included the 2011 BCS National Championship Game in Glendale, Arizona played on January 10 at the University of Phoenix Stadium. The bowl season concluded with the East–West Shrine Game, the Eastham Energy All-Star Game, the Senior Bowl, the Dixie Gridiron Classic, and the NFLPA Game. One bowl, the Toronto-based International Bowl, has ceased operations.

A new record of 35 team-competitive bowls, plus five all-star games, were played, including the inaugural TicketCity Bowl and Pinstripe Bowl (the International Bowl was dropped from the schedule this season). While bowl games had been the purview of only the very best teams for nearly a century, this was the fifth consecutive year that teams with non-winning seasons participated in bowl games. To fill the 70 available team-competitive bowl slots, a new record total of 14 teams (20% of all participants) with non-winning seasons participated in bowl games—all 14 had a .500 (6–6) season.

== Selection of the teams ==
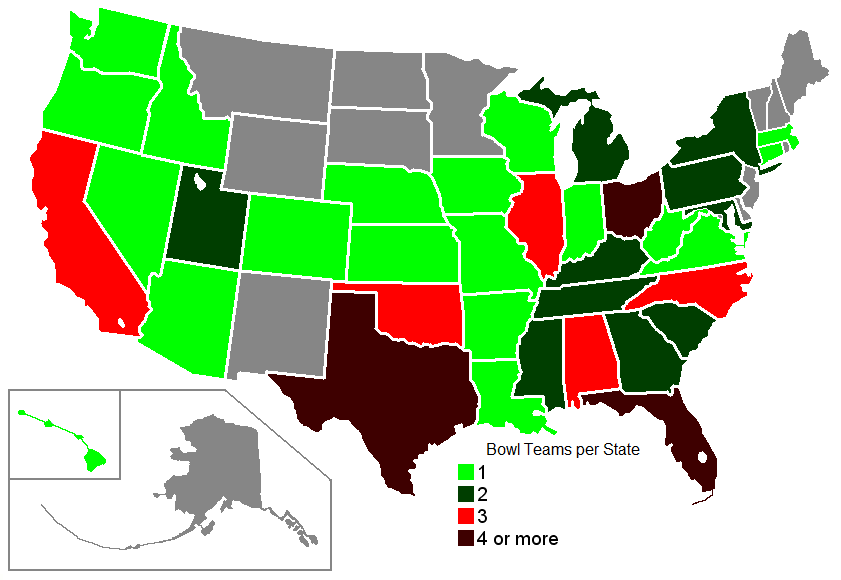
Number of bowl teams per state.

In a significant change from the 2009–10 bowl cycle, the NCAA scrapped a bylaw which mandated that a school with a record of 6–6 in regular season play was eligible only if conferences could not fill out available positions for bowl games with teams possessing seven (or more) wins (excluding games played in Hawaii and conference championship games in the ACC, Big 12, Conference USA, Mid-American Conference and the SEC). An example was in 2008 when the Big Ten, the Big 12 and SEC each had two teams selected for the Bowl Championship Series games – Ohio State and Penn State from the Big Ten, Texas and Oklahoma from the Big 12 and Alabama and Florida from the SEC. With each conference sending two teams to the BCS, these three conferences forfeited several bowl game slots due to a lack of teams with a winning record.

This change in policy ultimately led to Temple—a team that went 8–4 in the regular season, including a win over Big East BCS representative UConn—going uninvited.

On June 10, Southern California was declared ineligible for two years as a result of the eligibility of Reggie Bush from 2003 through 2005. While the program is appealing their 2011–12 eligibility, they have decided to accept the penalty for this season, snapping a nine-season streak of bowl appearances.

=== Eligible teams ===
- ACC (9): Virginia Tech (11–2 and ACC Champions), Florida State (9–4 and ACC Atlantic Champions), North Carolina State (8–4), Maryland (8–4), Miami (Florida) (7–5), North Carolina (7–5), Boston College (7–5), Georgia Tech (6–6), Clemson (6–6)
- Big East (6): South Florida (7-4), West Virginia (9-3 and Big East co-champions), Syracuse (7-5), Pittsburgh (7-5 and Big East co-champions), Connecticut (8-4, Big East Champions and Big East BCS Representative), Louisville (6-6)
- Big 12 (8): Missouri (10–2 and co-champion of Big 12 North), Oklahoma State (10–2 and co-champion Big 12 of Big 12 South Division), Baylor (7–5), Nebraska (10–3, Big 12 North Champions, will represent Big 12 North in Big 12 Championship), Oklahoma (11–2) (Big 12 Champions), Texas A&M (9–3 and co-champion Big 12 South Division), Kansas State (7–5), Texas Tech (7–5)
- Big Ten (8): Michigan State (11–1) (clinched a share of the Big Ten Championship), Ohio State (11–1) (clinched a share of the Big Ten Championship), Wisconsin (11–1) (clinched a share of the Big Ten Championship), Northwestern (7–5), Iowa (7–5), Michigan (7–5), Penn State (7–5), Illinois (6–6)
- Conference USA (6): UCF (10–3 and C-USA Champions), Tulsa (9–3 and Co-Champion of the C-USA West Division), Southern Miss (8–4), UTEP (6–6), East Carolina (6-6), SMU (7-6, C-USA West Champions and C-USA Championship Game West Division Representative)
- MAC (6): NIU (10–3 and MAC West Champions), Temple (8–4), Ohio (8–4), Toledo (8–4), Miami (Ohio) (9–4 and MAC Conference Champions), Western Michigan (6–6)
- Mountain West (5): TCU (12–0) (MWC Conference Champions), Utah (10–2), San Diego State (8–4), Air Force (8–4), BYU (6–6)
- Pac-10 (4): Oregon (12–0) (Pac-10 Conference Champions), Stanford (11–1), Arizona (7–5), Washington (6–6)
- SEC (10): Auburn (13–0 and SEC Champions), Arkansas (10–2), LSU (10–2), Alabama (9–3), South Carolina (9–4 and SEC East Champions), Mississippi State (8–4), Florida (7–5), Kentucky (6–6), Tennessee (6-6), Georgia (6-6)
- Sun Belt (3): Florida International (6-6 and Clinched Sun Belt Championship), Troy (7-5 and Sun Belt co-champions) Middle Tennessee (6–6)
- WAC (4): Boise State (11–1 and WAC co-champions), Nevada (12–1 and WAC co-champions), Hawaii (9–3 and WAC co-champions), Fresno State (8–4)
- Independents (3): Navy (9–3), Army (6–6), Notre Dame (7-5)
- Total eligible teams: 72

Note: Neither Temple nor Western Michigan, both from the MAC, was selected for a bowl game, despite being bowl-eligible.

== New bowls, sponsors, and stadiums in 2010–11 ==
=== New games ===
Two new games were played this season. The Cotton Bowl in Fair Park, the former home of the Cotton Bowl Classic, became the site of the TicketCity Bowl, on New Years Day 2011, with the Big Ten, the Big 12, and Conference USA (in alternating seasons) providing opponents, while Yankee Stadium hosted the inaugural New Era Pinstripe Bowl on December 30, 2010, pitting teams from the Big East and Big 12. This contest became the first bowl game in the Metropolitan New York area since the Garden State Bowl, and the first in New York City proper since the Gotham Bowl was played in the original Yankee Stadium. Two bowl games that were proposed — the Cure Bowl, which would have pitted members of Conference USA and the Sun Belt Conference in a contest at Bright House Networks Stadium on the campus of the University of Central Florida in Orlando, Florida, and the Christmas Bowl, scheduled to be played in Los Angeles — were not certified by the NCAA on April 23, 2010. The International Bowl, played at the Rogers Centre in Toronto from 2007 to 2010, was discontinued after the Big East affiliated with the Pinstripe Bowl.

With this year's expansion to 35 bowl games, the NCAA has placed a three-year moratorium, starting with the 2011–12 bowl season, on any new bowl games. The expansion to 70 teams required to fill these 35 bowl games has challenged the ability to actually find enough teams with winning (7–5 or higher) records to fill bowl slots. Teams with non-winning (6–6) and losing (6–7) records have participated in bowl games since the expansion to 35 games. By the 2012–13 bowl season, with multiple teams ineligible due to sanctions, the NCAA was forced to anticipate a need for teams with even worse (5–7) losing records to fill bowl selection slots in 2012–13.

=== New sponsors ===
A total of nine games had new sponsors. Two BCS games — the Orange Bowl and Rose Bowl — lost their sponsors. After more than two decades, FedEx dropped its sponsorship of the Orange Bowl, which now has Discover Financial as its title sponsor starting in 2011 for five games (including the 2013 BCS Championship) over four years. The Rose Bowl lost sponsor Citi, and became sponsored by Vizio through 2014, including the 2014 BCS Championship.

In non-BCS games, Kraft Foods took over as sponsor of the former Emerald Bowl at AT&T Park and renamed it the Kraft Fight Hunger Bowl, which will benefit food banks and Feeding America under a three-year contract. Bridgepoint Education replaced Pacific Life for the Holiday Bowl played at Qualcomm Stadium in San Diego. Terms of the deal were not disclosed. South Korean automobile maker Hyundai supplanted Helen of Troy's Brut cologne brand as sponsor of the Sun Bowl played in El Paso, Texas, and will continue to do for four years. Northrop Grumman became the sponsor of the former EagleBank Bowl in Washington, D.C., and renamed it the Military Bowl, while the BBVA Compass Bowl formerly called the PapaJohns.com Bowl got a new sponsor, and domain name registrar Go Daddy took over sponsorship of the GoDaddy.com Bowl. Insurance giant Progressive Corporation assumed sponsorship of the Gator Bowl on New Year's Day in Jacksonville after a four-year run as sponsor by Konica Minolta ended in 2010.

One postseason all-star game changed both its location and name. The Texas vs The Nation game was renamed for its title sponsor, the National Football League Players Association, and moved from El Paso to the Alamodome in San Antonio. The game retained the old "Texas vs. the Nation" format used in all of the other previous games.

=== New site ===
One previous bowl had a different venue beginning in the 2010–2011 bowl game season. The Armed Forces Bowl, which was held at Amon G. Carter Stadium on the campus of Texas Christian University in Fort Worth since its inception in 2003, was displaced due to a renovation project that started immediately after TCU's last home game of the season. The project was not expected to be complete until 2012. As a result, the 2010 and 2011 editions of the game were moved to Gerald J. Ford Stadium on the campus of Southern Methodist University in the Dallas enclave of University Park.

== Television ==
ESPN took over coverage of the entire Bowl Championship Series starting this year, and also began airing the Rose Bowl Game under a new four-year contract that is separate from the BCS. Additionally, a new BCS logo was unveiled during the contest between Alabama and Texas. This will mark the first time the games have not been available on broadcast television since the medium began broadcasting the games. ESPN networks will also take over coverage of the Gator Bowl (previously on CBS) and Capital One Bowl (previously on ABC).

As a result of the changes, only three bowl games aired on broadcast television: the Hyundai Sun Bowl on CBS New Year's Eve, the Outback Bowl on ABC New Year's Day, and the AT&T Cotton Bowl Classic on Fox January 7. All other bowl games were broadcast on one of the ESPN networks, not counting all-star games.

== Changing landscapes of conferences ==
The 2010–11 bowl season was the last of several schools in the current conferences configurations. In May and June 2010, reports surfaced that seven or eight schools would leave the Big 12 Conference (which was originally formed from the old Big Eight Conference and four of the schools from the defunct Southwest Conference – Texas, Texas A&M, Texas Tech and Baylor) to go to new conferences.

On June 6, Colorado, Oklahoma, Oklahoma State, Texas, Texas A&M and Texas Tech (effectively the Big 12 South Division minus Baylor plus the North Division's Colorado) were rumored to have been invited to join the Pacific-10 Conference. On June 10, Colorado announced its intention to join the Pacific-10 Conference, effective 2012 (later changed to 2011). Nebraska announced their departure from the Big 12 on June 11, joining the eleven-school Big Ten Conference, effective July 1, 2011, thereby leaving the Big 12 with ten schools and the Big Ten with 12 schools.

On June 11, Boise State announced their intentions to leave the WAC and join the Mountain West Conference. In August 2010, WAC members Nevada and Fresno State followed suit, leaving the WAC with six teams. Boise State will join the MWC in 2011, with Fresno State and Nevada following in 2012.

The Pac-10 added Utah from the MWC on June 17, effective 2011, expanding the Pacific-10 Conference to twelve teams, with the conference officially becoming the Pac-12 Conference in July 2011.

The Big 12 will remain intact (sans Nebraska and Colorado) as a ten-team league, discontinuing their championship game following the 2010 contest at Cowboys Stadium in Arlington, Texas, in which Oklahoma defeated departing member Nebraska. Starting in 2011, championship games in both the Big Ten (at Lucas Oil Stadium) and the Pac-12 (at the home stadium of the school with the best conference record) will decide which team will represent their conferences in the Rose Bowl Game.

The next conference movements came on November 11, when the WAC added two new football members in Texas State and UTSA, both FCS schools from the Southland Conference. Texas State had an established football program, while UTSA was slated to begin full FCS play in 2011. Both schools will now upgrade their football programs to FBS level, join the WAC for all sports in 2012, and become full FBS members in 2013.

Later, on December 10, Hawaii announced they would leave the WAC and join the Mountain West as a football-only member and the Big West Conference for other sports.

== Schedule ==
NOTE:. All times US EST (UTC −5).

Non-BCS Contests
Date	Game	Site	Television	Participants and Results
Dec. 18	New Mexico Bowl	University Stadium; University of New Mexico; Albuquerque, New Mexico; 2:00 pm	ESPN	BYU (6–6) 52; UTEP (6–6) 24
Dec. 18	Humanitarian Bowl	Bronco Stadium; Boise State University; Boise, Idaho; 5:30 pm	ESPN	Northern Illinois (10–3) 40; Fresno State (8–4) 17
Dec. 18	New Orleans Bowl	Louisiana Superdome; New Orleans; 9:00 pm	ESPN	Troy (7–5) 48; Ohio (8–4) 21
Dec. 21	Beef 'O' Brady's Bowl	Tropicana Field; St. Petersburg, Florida; 8:00 pm	ESPN	Southern Miss (8–4) 28; Louisville (6–6) 31
Dec. 22	Maaco Bowl Las Vegas	Sam Boyd Stadium; University of Nevada, Las Vegas; Whitney, Nevada; 8:00 pm	ESPN	#19 Utah (10–2) 3 #10 Boise State (11–1) 26
Dec. 23	Poinsettia Bowl	Qualcomm Stadium; San Diego; 8:00 pm	ESPN	Navy (9–3) 14; San Diego State (8–4) 35
Dec. 24	Hawaii Bowl	Aloha Stadium; Honolulu, HI; 8:00 pm	ESPN	#24 Hawaii (10–3) 35; Tulsa (9–3) 62
Dec. 26	Little Caesars Pizza Bowl	Ford Field; Detroit; 8:30 pm	ESPN	FIU (6–6) 34; Toledo (8–4) 32
Dec. 27	Independence Bowl	Independence Stadium; Shreveport, Louisiana; 5:00 pm	ESPN2	Air Force (8–4) 14; Georgia Tech (6–6) 7
Dec. 28	Champs Sports Bowl	Citrus Bowl; Orlando, Florida; 6:30 pm	ESPN	#22 West Virginia (9–3) 7 NC State (8–4) 23
Dec. 28	Insight Bowl	Sun Devil Stadium; Arizona State University; Tempe, Arizona; 10:00 pm	ESPN	#12 Missouri (10–2) 24; Iowa (7–5) 27
Dec. 29	Military Bowl	RFK Stadium; Washington, D.C. 2:30 pm	ESPN	East Carolina (6–6) 20; Maryland (8–4) 51
Dec. 29	Texas Bowl	Reliant Stadium; Houston; 6:00 pm	ESPN	Illinois (6–6) 38; Baylor (7–5) 14
Dec. 29	Alamo Bowl	Alamodome; San Antonio; 9:15 pm	ESPN	#14 Oklahoma State (10–2) 36; Arizona (7–5) 10
Dec. 30	Armed Forces Bowl	Gerald J. Ford Stadium; Southern Methodist University; University Park, Texas; Noon	ESPN	Army (6–6) 16; SMU (7–6) 14
Dec. 30	Pinstripe Bowl	Yankee Stadium; The Bronx, New York City; 3:20 pm	ESPN	Kansas State (7–5) 34; Syracuse (7–5) 36
Dec. 30	Music City Bowl	LP Field; Nashville, Tennessee; 6:40 pm	ESPN	North Carolina (7–5) 30; Tennessee (6–6) 27 (2OT)
Dec. 30	Holiday Bowl	Qualcomm Stadium; San Diego; 10:00 pm	ESPN	#18 Nebraska (10–3) 7 Washington (6–6) 19
Dec. 31	Meineke Car Care Bowl	Bank of America Stadium; Charlotte, North Carolina; Noon	ESPN	South Florida (7–5) 31; Clemson (6–6) 26
Dec. 31	Sun Bowl	Sun Bowl Stadium; University of Texas El Paso; El Paso, Texas; 2:00 pm	CBS	Notre Dame (7–5) 33; Miami (FL) (7–5) 17
Dec. 31	Liberty Bowl	Liberty Bowl; Memphis, Tennessee; 3:30 pm	ESPN	Georgia (6–6) 6 #25 UCF (10–3) 10
Dec. 31	Chick-fil-A Bowl	Georgia Dome; Atlanta; 7:30 pm	ESPN	#20 South Carolina (9–4) 17 #23 Florida State (9–4) 26
Jan. 1	TicketCity Bowl	Cotton Bowl; Fair Park, Dallas; Noon	ESPNU	Northwestern (7–5) 38; Texas Tech (7–5) 45
Jan. 1	Outback Bowl	Raymond James Stadium; Tampa, Florida; 1:00 pm	ABC	Florida (8–4) 37; Penn State (7–5) 24
Jan. 1	Capital One Bowl	Citrus Bowl; Orlando, Florida; 1:00 pm	ESPN	#16 Alabama (9–3) 49 #9 Michigan State (11–1) 7
Jan. 1	Gator Bowl	EverBank Field; Jacksonville, Florida; 1:30 pm	ESPN2	#21 Mississippi State (8–4) 52; Michigan (7–5) 14
Jan. 6	GoDaddy.com Bowl	Ladd–Peebles Stadium; Mobile, Alabama; 8:00 pm	ESPN	Middle Tennessee (6–6) 21; Miami (OH) (9–4) 35
Jan. 7	Cotton Bowl	Cowboys Stadium; Arlington, Texas; 8:00 pm	Fox	#11 LSU (10–2) 41 #17 Texas A&M (9–3) 24
Jan. 8	BBVA Compass Bowl	Legion Field; Birmingham, Alabama; Noon	ESPN	Pittsburgh (7–5) 27; Kentucky (6–6) 10
Jan. 9	Kraft Fight Hunger Bowl	AT&T Park; San Francisco; 9:00 pm	ESPN	#15 Nevada (12–1) 20; Boston College (7–5) 13
Bowl Championship Series 2011 Schedule
Date	Game	Site	Television	Participants and Results
Jan. 1	Rose Bowl	Rose Bowl; Pasadena, California; 4:30 pm	ESPN	#5 Wisconsin (11–1) 19 #3 TCU (12–0) 21
Jan. 1	Fiesta Bowl	University of Phoenix Stadium; Glendale, Arizona; 8:30 pm	ESPN	Connecticut (8–4) 20 #7 Oklahoma (11–2) 48
Jan. 3	Orange Bowl	Sun Life Stadium; Miami Gardens, Florida; 8:30 pm	ESPN	#4 Stanford (11–1) 40 #13 Virginia Tech (11–2) 12
Jan. 4	Sugar Bowl	Louisiana Superdome; New Orleans; 8:30 pm	ESPN	#6 Ohio State (11–1) 31 #8 Arkansas (10–2) 26
Jan. 10	BCS National Championship Game	University of Phoenix Stadium; Glendale, Arizona; 8:30 pm	ESPN	#2 Oregon (12–0) 19 #1 Auburn (13–0) 22

== Post-BCS all-star games ==
Date	All-Star Game	Site	Television	Participants
Jan. 22	East–West Shrine Game	Citrus Bowl; Orlando, Florida; 3:00 pm	NFL Network	East 25; West 8
Jan. 23	Eastham Energy All-Star Game	Sun Devil Stadium; Tempe, Arizona	Fox College Sports	Stripes 40; Stars 34
Jan. 29	Under Armour Senior Bowl	Ladd–Peebles Stadium; Mobile, Alabama; 4:00 pm	NFL Network	South 24; North 10
Feb. 5	Texas vs The Nation	Alamodome; San Antonio	CBS College Sports	Texas 13; The Nation 7
Feb. 5	Dixie Gridiron Classic	Hansen Stadium; St. George, Utah	None	Mountain 17; Pacific 13
