= 2005 NCAA football bowl games =

In college football, 2005 NCAA football bowl games may refer to:

- 2004–05 NCAA football bowl games, for games played in January 2005 as part of the 2004 season.
- 2005–06 NCAA football bowl games, for games played in December 2005 as part of the 2005 season.
