= 2011 NCAA football bowl games =

In college football, 2011 NCAA football bowl games may refer to:

- 2010–11 NCAA football bowl games, for games played in January 2011 as part of the 2010 season
- 2011–12 NCAA football bowl games, for games played in December 2011 as part of the 2011 season
