= Bowl Challenge Cup =

Competition among college football conferences

- Awarded for: Best college football bowl record among Division I Football Bowl Subdivision conferences
- Country: United States
- Presented by: ESPN

History
- First award: 2002–03
- Most wins: Mountain West (5)
- Most recent: Big Ten (2025–26)

The Bowl Challenge Cup is a competition among NCAA college football conferences in the Football Bowl Subdivision (FBS), formerly called Division I-A, based on win–loss records in the bowl games that take place annually during December and January. The winner is the conference that has the highest winning percentage, among conferences with a minimum of three teams appearing in bowl games.

The Challenge was created in 2002 by ESPN, who also occasionally refers to it as the "Bowl Cup Challenge" when promoting it. Originally sponsored by Cooper Tire, ESPN went several years without a sponsor; since the 2015–16 bowl season, Progressive has been the sponsor.

== Participants ==
The ten Football Bowl Subdivision (formerly Division I-A) conferences that compete in the Bowl Challenge Cup are:

Power conferences

- Atlantic Coast Conference
- Big Ten Conference
- Big 12 Conference
- Southeastern Conference

Other conferences

- American Conference
- Conference USA
- Mid-American Conference
- Mountain West Conference
- Pac-12 Conference†
- Sun Belt Conference

† Since the 2024 season, the Pac-12 has lacked a sufficient number of teams to meet the minimum number of bowl games required for Bowl Challenge Cup honors.

Former conferences that competed in the Bowl Challenge Cup were:

- Big East Conference, which reorganized as the American Athletic Conference (now known as the American Conference) after the 2012 season
- Western Athletic Conference, which has not sponsored football in FBS since the 2012 season

== Results ==
Bowl Challenge Cup champions
Bowl season	Conference	W	L	Win %	Ref.
2002–03	Big Ten	5	2	.714	
2003–04	ACC	5	1	.833	
2004–05	Mountain West	2	1	.667	
2005–06	ACC	5	3	.625	
2005–06	Big 12	5	3	.625	
2006–07	Big East	5	0	1.000	
2007–08	Mountain West	4	1	.800	
2008–09	Pacific-10	5	0	1.000	
2009–10	Mountain West	4	1	.800	
2010–11	Mountain West	4	1	.800	
2011–12	Conference USA	4	1	.800	
2011–12	MAC	4	1	.800	
2012–13	Conference USA	4	1	.800	
2013–14	SEC	7	3	.700	
2014–15	Conference USA	4	1	.800	
2015–16	SEC	9	2	.818	
2016–17	ACC	9	3	.750	
2017–18	Big Ten	7	1	.875	
2018–19	Conference USA	4	2	.667	
2019–20	SEC	8	2	.800	
2020–21	Big 12	5	0	1.000	
2021–22	Mountain West	5	1	.833	
2022–23	MAC	4	2	.667	
2023–24	Big Ten	6	4	.600	
2024–25	American	6	2	.750	
2025–26	Big Ten	11	5	.688	

Number of Bowl Challenge Cup championships
Conference	Times	Championships
Mountain West	5	2004–05, 2007–08, 2009–10, 2010–11, 2021–22
Big Ten	4	2002–03, 2017–18, 2023–24, 2025–26
Conference USA (C-USA)	3 1/2	2011–12, 2012–13, 2014–15, 2018–19
Southeastern (SEC)	3	2013–14, 2015–16, 2019–20
Atlantic Coast (ACC)	2 1/2	2003–04, 2005–06, 2016–17
American (Big East to 2013)	2	2006–07, 2024–25
Big 12	1 1/2	2005–06, 2020–21
Mid-American (MAC)	1 1/2	2011–12, 2022–23
Pac-12 (Pacific-10 to 2010)	1	2008–09
Sun Belt	0	

Italics designate a shared title (tie).
