= Casino del Sol College All-Star Game =

Former post-season college football all-star game

Casino Del Sol College All-Star Game (defunct)
- Stadium: Kino Stadium (2012–2013); Sun Devil Stadium (2011)
- Location: Tucson, Arizona (2012–2013); Tempe, Arizona (2011)
- Operated: 2011–2013

Sponsors
- Casino Del Sol (2012–2013)

Former names
- Eastham Energy College All-Star Game (2011)

The Casino del Sol College All-Star Game was a post-season college football all-star game that was established in 2011 as part of the post-BCS events; the game was discontinued after its third playing, in 2013.

The game was first played at Sun Devil Stadium in Tempe, Arizona, in January 2011, when it was sponsored by Eastham Energy. The game then relocated to Tucson, Arizona, and was played at Kino Veterans Memorial Stadium. The game was sponsored by Casino Del Sol, a casino located in Tucson, for its final two years.

== Game results ==
Date	Winning team		Losing team		Winning team coach	Losing team coach	Notes
January 23, 2011	Stripes	40	Stars	34	Hal Mumme	Joe Moglia	
January 16, 2012	Stripes	24	Stars	21	Pat Hill	Houston Nutt	
January 11, 2013	West	40	East	7	Dick Tomey	Houston Nutt	

== Game MVPs ==
Year	Game MVP	Offensive Player	Defensive Player
2011		Brandon Smith (WR, Arizona State)	Loyce Means (CB, Houston)
2012	Matt Faulkner (QB, San Jose State)	LaMark Brown (WR, Minnesota State - Mankato)	Jeremy Lane (CB, Northwestern State)
2013	Drew Terrell (WR, Stanford)		

== See also ==
- List of college bowl games
