= 2005–06 NCAA football bowl games =

College football postseason game series

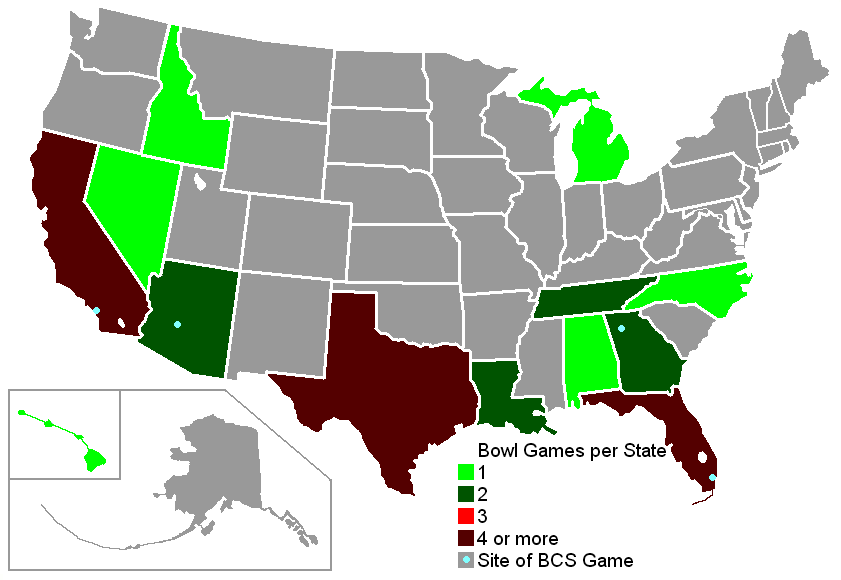
- Bowl sites by state
- Season: 2005
- Regular season: September 1 – December 3
- Number of bowls: 28
- All-star games: 5
- Bowl games: December 20, 2005 – January 4, 2006
- National Championship: 2006 Rose Bowl
- Location of Championship: Rose Bowl Stadium, Pasadena, California
- Champions: Texas Longhorns
- Bowl Challenge Cup winner: (tie) Big 12 and ACC
Bowl record by conference
Conference	Bowls	Record	Final AP poll
ACC	8	5–3 (0.625)	5
Big 12	8	5–3 (0.625)	4
Big Ten	7	3–4 (0.429)	3
SEC	6	3–3 (0.500)	5
Conference USA	6	3–3 (0.500)	0
Pac-10	5	3–2 (0.600)	4
Mountain West	4	2–2 (0.500)	1
Big East	4	1–3 (0.250)	2
WAC	3	1–2 (0.333)	0
Independents	2	1–1 (0.500)	1
MAC	2	1–1 (0.500)	1
Sun Belt	1	0–1 (0.000)	0

The 2005–06 NCAA football bowl games were a series of 28 post-season games (including the Bowl Championship Series) that was played in December 2005 and January 2006 for Division I-A football teams and all-stars from Divisions I-AA, II, and III, as well as from the NAIA. The post-season began with the New Orleans Bowl on December 20, 2005, and concluded with the Senior Bowl, played on January 28, 2006.

For the second consecutive year, the 28 team-competitive bowl games were played by 56 teams with winning records, as no teams with non-winning seasons (6–6, or .500) were invited to participate in bowl games.

== Schedule ==
–	Non-BCS Bowls				
Date	Time	Game	Site	Matchup	Ref.
Dec 20	8:00 PM	New Orleans Bowl	Cajun Field · Lafayette, LA	Southern Miss 31, Arkansas State 19	
Dec 21	8:00 PM	GMAC Bowl	Ladd–Peebles Stadium · Mobile, AL	Toledo 45, UTEP 13	
Dec 22	8:00 PM	Las Vegas Bowl	Sam Boyd Stadium · Whitney, NV	California 35, BYU 28	
Dec 22	10:30 PM	Poinsettia Bowl	Qualcomm Stadium · San Diego, CA	Navy 51, Colorado State 30	
Dec 23	8:00 PM	Fort Worth Bowl	Amon G. Carter Stadium · Fort Worth, TX	Kansas 42, Houston 13	
Dec 24	8:30 PM	Hawaii Bowl	Aloha Stadium · Honolulu, HI	Nevada 49, UCF 48	
Dec 26	4:00 PM	Motor City Bowl	Ford Field · Detroit, MI	Memphis 38, Akron 31	
Dec 27	5:00 PM	Champs Sports Bowl	Florida Citrus Bowl · Orlando, FL	No. 23 Clemson 19, Colorado 10	
Dec 27	8:30 PM	Insight Bowl	Chase Field · Phoenix, AZ	Arizona State 45, Rutgers 40	
Dec 28	4:30 PM	MPC Computers Bowl	Bronco Stadium · Boise, ID	No. 19 Boston College 27, Boise State 21	
Dec 28	8:00 PM	Alamo Bowl	Alamodome · San Antonio, TX	Nebraska 32, No. 20 Michigan 28	
Dec 29	4:30 PM	Emerald Bowl	SBC Park · San Francisco, CA	Utah 38, No. 24 Georgia Tech 10	
Dec 29	8:00 PM	Holiday Bowl	Qualcomm Stadium · San Diego, CA	Oklahoma 17, No. 6 Oregon 14	
Dec 30	12:00 PM	Music City Bowl	The Coliseum · Nashville, TN	Virginia 34, Minnesota 31	
Dec 30	2:00 PM	Sun Bowl	Sun Bowl · El Paso, TX	No. 17 UCLA 50, Northwestern 38	
Dec 30	3:30 PM	Independence Bowl	Independence Stadium · Shreveport, LA	Missouri 38, South Carolina 31	
Dec 30	7:30 PM	Peach Bowl	Georgia Dome · Atlanta, GA	No. 10 LSU 40, No. 9 Miami (FL) 3	
Dec 31	11:00 AM	Meineke Car Care Bowl	Bank of America Stadium · Charlotte, NC	NC State 14, South Florida 0	
Dec 31	1:00 PM	Liberty Bowl	Liberty Bowl Memorial Stadium · Memphis, TN	Tulsa 31, Fresno State 24	
Dec 31	2:30 PM	Houston Bowl	Reliant Stadium · Houston, TX	No. 14 TCU 27, Iowa State 24	
Jan 2	11:00 AM	Cotton Bowl	Cotton Bowl · Dallas, TX	No. 13 Alabama 13, No. 18 Texas Tech 10	
Jan 2	11:00 AM	Outback Bowl	Raymond James Stadium · Tampa, FL	No. 16 Florida 31, No. 25 Iowa 24	
Jan 2	12:30 PM	Gator Bowl	Alltel Stadium · Jacksonville, FL	No. 12 Virginia Tech 35, No. 15 Louisville 24	
Jan 2	1:00 PM	Capital One Bowl	Florida Citrus Bowl · Orlando, FL	No. 21 Wisconsin 24, No. 7 Auburn 10	
BCS Bowls
Jan 2	4:30 PM	Fiesta Bowl	Sun Devil Stadium · Tempe, AZ	No. 4 Ohio State 34, No. 5 Notre Dame 20	
Jan 2	8:30 PM	Sugar Bowl	Georgia Dome · Atlanta, GA	No. 11 West Virginia 38, No. 8 Georgia 35	
Jan 3	8:00 PM	Orange Bowl	Dolphins Stadium · Miami Gardens, FL	No. 3 Penn State 26, No. 22 Florida State 23	
Jan 4	8:00 PM	Rose Bowl (BCS National Championship Game)	Rose Bowl · Pasadena, CA	No. 2 Texas 41, No. 1 USC 38	
Rankings from AP Poll released prior to the game. All times are in Eastern Time.

== Non-BCS bowls ==
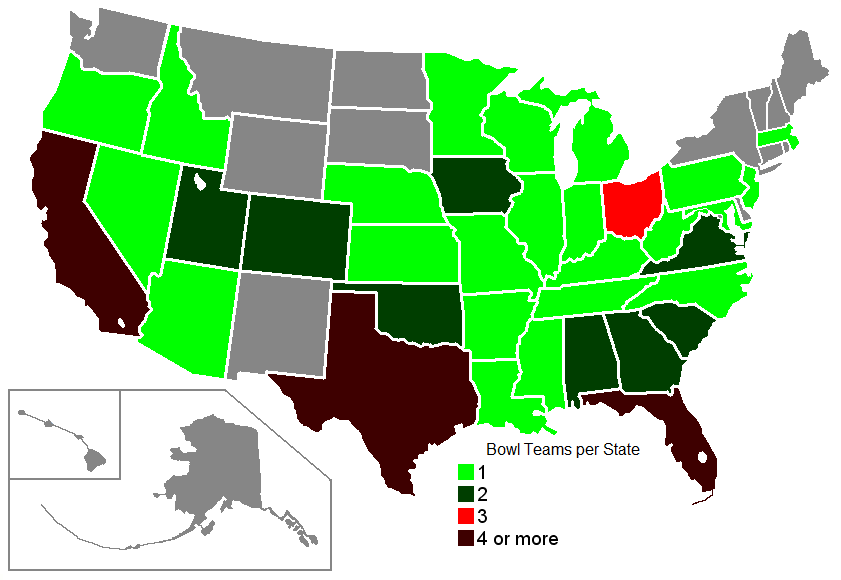
Number of bowl-going teams per state.

With 64 teams having winning records, and 56 slots in bowl games, there were more teams than slots available for teams to get a bowl bid. Again, as in 2004, two conferences — the Pac 10 and the SEC — did not have enough teams to fill the required number of slots for their non-BCS bowls. A third conference — the Big Ten — had two teams in the BCS (Penn State as the conference champion, and Ohio State meeting Notre Dame in the Fiesta Bowl January 2). The biggest beneficiary this year was the ACC, which replaced the SEC at the Music City Bowl (Virginia) and the Pac-10 (Georgia Tech) at the Emerald Bowl; Conference USA also gained a slot, sending Memphis to the Motor City Bowl. Unlike last year, where a fighting incident during the game between Clemson and South Carolina led each team to impose a post-season ban, no school forfeited post-season play this year.

The eight teams with winning records that did not get bowl bids were Louisiana Tech (7–4) from the WAC, MAC teams Miami (Ohio) (7–4), Bowling Green (6–5), Western Michigan (7–4), NIU (7–5) and Central Michigan (6–5), Mountain West representative New Mexico (6–5) and the Sun Belt's Louisiana–Lafayette (6–5). Four teams made their Division I-A bowl debuts — Arkansas State (Sun Belt, New Orleans Bowl at Lafayette), South Florida (Big East, Meineke Car Care Bowl), Central Florida (C-USA, Hawaii Bowl) and Akron (MAC, Motor City Bowl). Akron, notably, had been the only bowl-eligible team willing to accept an invitation to be left out of the 2004 bowl games. However, none of the teams benefitted from "beginner's luck", as each lost its game.

Participants in non-BCS bowls are selected on the basis of conference tie-ins. All bowl payouts are given in US dollars. All records shown are pre-bowl game.

=== New Orleans Bowl at Lafayette ===
- Southern Mississippi (6–5) 31, Arkansas State (6–5) 19

The New Orleans Bowl is usually one of two bowls that are played at the Louisiana Superdome in New Orleans, Louisiana. Due to Hurricane Katrina, the 2005 game was played on December 20 in Lafayette, Louisiana at Cajun Field on the campus of the University of Louisiana at Lafayette. C-USA's Southern Mississippi returned and defended their title as they defeated the Sun Belt Conference champion Arkansas State, 31–19. The Golden Eagles were led by quarterback Dustin Almond, who threw for 235 yards and two touchdowns, and running back Cody Hull, who added 161 yards rushing and one touchdown on 37 carries. Special teams play helped the Indians to stay close, with kicker Eric Neihouse kicking a 44-yard field goal and two extra points, and with the team forcing a safety on an attempted Southern Miss punt.

=== GMAC Bowl ===
- Toledo (8–3) 45, UTEP (8–3) 13

The GMAC Bowl at Ladd–Peebles Stadium in Mobile, Alabama took place on December 21, 2005. Toledo, representing the Mid-American Conference, defeated C-USA's UTEP Miners 45–13. In his last game for the Rockets, quarterback Bruce Gradkowski threw for five touchdowns and 298 yards. Seven of the Miners' 13 points came off the leg of kicker Reagan Schneider, with Johnnie Lee Higgins' catching the only touchdown of the day for UTEP to account for the rest of the scoring.

=== Las Vegas Bowl ===
- California (7–4) 35, BYU (6–5) 28

The Las Vegas Bowl at Sam Boyd Stadium, located about eight miles from the campus of the University of Nevada, Las Vegas in Whitney, Nevada, was the first game of two to be played on December 22, 2005. In the first matchup of the bowl season to pit a BCS AQ conference team against a BCS non-AQ conference team, California, from the Pac-10, beat Mountain West representative BYU, 35–28. Golden Bears running back Marshawn Lynch, voted the game's most valuable player, ran for 194 yards and three touchdowns on just 24 carries, as California took a 35–14 lead into the fourth quarter before the Cougars recorded two late touchdowns off the arm of quarterback John Beck to make the final victory less decisive.

=== Emerald Bowl ===
- Utah (6–5) 38, Georgia Tech (7–4) 10

The Emerald Bowl at SBC Park (now known as AT&T Park), usually the home of Major League Baseball's San Francisco Giants in San Francisco, California was played on December 29, 2005. The MWC's Utah, which last year became the first school from a BCS non-automatic qualifying conference to appear in a BCS bowl, jumped out to a 20–0 lead and played well throughout to defeat the ACC's Georgia Tech, 38–10. Utes junior transfer quarterback Brett Ratliff, filling in for Brian Johnson, who suffered a season-ending knee injury November 12, played superbly, completing 30 of 41 passes for 381 yards and four touchdowns and a two-point conversion, compiling a pass efficiency rating of 112.9, bringing to mind the performance of Utah quarterback Alex Smith in the 2005 Fiesta Bowl. All of Ratliff's scoring throws went to senior wide receiver Travis LaTendresse, who finished with 16 catches for 214 yards after averaging fewer than five catches per game during the regular season. Running back Quinton Ganther added 120 yards, many as the Utes ran out the clock in the fourth quarter, and a back-breaking 41-yard touchdown with 8:34 to play. Yellow Jackets running back P.J. Daniels exploited the Utah defense for 108 yards on 20 carries, but quarterback Reggie Ball played an uneven game, completing only 47 percent of his passes and throwing two interceptions, one of which came at the Utah 21-yard-line and was returned 45 yards to end a Georgia Tech scoring chance, to just one touchdown. After the Utes recorded three touchdowns in the first 16:02 of the game, Ball brought the Yellow Jackets to within ten at the half, but was unable to make consistent progress the rest of the game, finding star wide receiver Calvin Johnson only twice for 19 yards. Georgia Tech took a slot normally reserved for the Pac-10, which failed to qualify enough teams for bowl eligibility. Utah became the first BCS non-AQ school to defeat a BCS AQ conference team this bowl season. The Emerald Bowl is now known as the Fight Hunger Bowl.

=== Poinsettia Bowl ===
- Navy (8–3) 51, Colorado State (6–5) 30

The inaugural Poinsettia Bowl at Qualcomm Stadium in San Diego, California was also played on December 22 when independent Navy beat the Mountain West's Colorado State, 51–30. Bringing the nation's number one-ranked rushing offense against the nation's 105th ranked rushing defense, the Midshipmen broke the game open in the second quarter, when running back Reggie Campbell scored two of his NCAA bowl record-tying five touchdowns; he finished with 116 yards rushing, 89 yards receiving, and 85 yards returning. Quarterback Justin Holland led the Rams in a losing effort, throwing for 381 yards and three touchdowns in completing 79% of his passes.

=== Fort Worth Bowl ===
- Kansas (6–5) 42, Houston (6–5) 13

The Fort Worth Bowl at Amon G. Carter Stadium on the campus of Texas Christian University in Fort Worth, Texas was contested December 23, 2005. Kansas, from the Big 12, who qualified on the last Saturday in November for a bowl game, defeated Houston from C-USA, 42–13, thanks to Jason Swanson's four touchdown passes. Running back Jon Cornish paced the Jayhawks with 101 rushing yards on just 16 carries, while the defense pressured Cougars quarterback Kevin Kolb into three interceptions, also sacking him twice. After this season, the Bowl got a new sponsor in Bell Helicopters as well as a new name in the "Armed Forces Bowl", and started to invite a MWC teams to challenge the C-USA team as part of a rotation with the Pac 10.

=== Hawaii Bowl ===
- Nevada (8–3) 49, Central Florida (8–4) 48 (overtime)

The Hawaii Bowl at Aloha Stadium in Honolulu, Hawaii was played on December 24, 2005. For the first time since the game was first contested in 2002, the Hawaii Warriors did not play in this game, as they had a losing record in 2005, disqualifying them from bowl eligibility. Nevada, the WAC co-champion, beat C-USA's Central Florida, 49–48, as Golden Knights kicker Matt Prater missed an extra point in overtime, sealing a defeat for UCF, who was playing in its first ever bowl game, having gone winless as recently as 2004. Each team gained over 550 yards, and each had three players average better than five yards per carry; freshman running back Kevin Smith led the Golden Knights with 202 yards and three touchdowns on 29 carries, while running backs B.J. Mitchell and Robert Hubbard combined to gain 304 yards on 38 carries, also adding five touchdowns.

=== Motor City Bowl ===
- Memphis (6–5) 38, Akron (7–5) 31

The Motor City Bowl at Ford Field in Detroit, Michigan was played on December 26, 2005. C-USA member Memphis, behind the running of DeAngelo Williams, who set an NCAA Division I-A record with his 34th career 100-yard game, defeated MAC champion Akron, 38–31, preventing the Zips from winning in their first-ever Division I-A Bowl Game. Akron quarterback Luke Getsy starred in his team's loss to the Tigers, setting a bowl record with 455 yards passing and tying another with four touchdowns.

=== Champs Sports Bowl ===
- Clemson (7–4) 19, Colorado (7–5) 10

The Champs Sports Bowl, the first of two games played at Citrus Bowl Stadium in Orlando, Florida, was contested on December 27, 2005. ACC representative Clemson scored with less than two minutes remaining to ensure a 19–10 win against Big 12 representative Colorado, which was trying to a win after having lost its previous two games by a combined score of 100–6 and after having seen coach Gary Barnett fired just weeks before the bowl game. Clemson quarterback Charlie Whitehurst, playing with a sore shoulder, completed 22 of 30 passes for 210 yards and running back James Davis added 149 yards on 28 carries as the Tigers outgained the Buffaloes by 239 yards, surrendering only one touchdown, a Brian White pass to Quinn Sypniewski. Starting in 2006, a Big Ten team was invited to take the place of the Big 12.

=== Insight Bowl ===
- Arizona State (6–5) 45, Rutgers (7–4) 40

The Insight Bowl at Chase Field, home to Major League Baseball's Arizona Diamondbacks, in Phoenix, Arizona, was played as well on December 27. Pac-10 representative Arizona State, in what was a de facto home game, finally broke open a back-and-forth, sloppy affair (the teams combined for nineteen penalties) in the fourth quarter and then held off a comeback attempt, defeating Big East representative Rutgers, 45–40. In the final Insight Bowl to be played at the stadium formerly known as Bank One Ballpark, Sun Devils quarterback Rudy Carpenter threw for 467 yards and four touchdowns, two to senior wide receiver Matt Miller, who finished with five catches for 135 yards. The Scarlet Knights, playing in their first bowl since 1978, when they appeared in the Garden State Bowl against Arizona State, were paced by quarterback Ryan Hart's three touchdowns and 376 passing yards, and by kicker Jeremy Ito, who recorded four field goals, two from beyond 48 yards, and four extra points. The two teams combined for 1,211 yards of offense, a record for any bowl game at the time. Beginning next season, the Big Ten and Big 12 would send teams to the contest, which will be played on the ASU campus at Sun Devil Stadium.

=== MPC Computers Bowl ===
- Boston College (8–3) 27, Boise State (9–3) 21

The MPC Computers Bowl at Bronco Stadium in Boise, Idaho was the first game of two that were played on December 28, 2005. Though playing at home on its blue "Smurf Turf", where it held a 31-game winning streak, WAC co-champion Boise State was unable to get its usually potent offense untracked early, falling behind ACC rep Boston College by 24 at halftime before losing, 27–21. Sophomore quarterback Matt Ryan led the way for the Eagles, throwing for 262 yards and three touchdowns, two to junior wide receiver Tony Gonzalez and one to senior Will Blackmon, who led all receivers with 144 yards on just five catches. The Broncos were held scoreless by the Boston College defense for the first 43:46 of the game and hindered their own efforts with three turnovers and eight penalties. Playing their final game under coach Dan Hawkins, who would coach Colorado next season, Boise State essayed a late comeback, with junior quarterback Jared Zabransky throwing for one touchdown (a 53-yarder to Drisan James) and running for another. Junior Quinton Jones brought Boise State to within six when he took a Johnny Ayers punt 92 yards for a touchdown with less than four minutes to play in the game, but Boise State's last drive from midfield with less than two minutes stalled and Zabransky threw an end-zone interception to seal the Eagles' win. Boston College thus extended its NCAA-best bowl winning streak to six games, and also ran the BCS AQ conferences' record to 3–0 against BCS non-AQ conference teams this bowl season.

=== Alamo Bowl ===
- Nebraska (7–4) 32, Michigan (7–4) 28

The Alamo Bowl at the Alamodome in San Antonio, Texas was the second game played on December 28. In a battle of perennial powerhouses, Nebraska, returning to post-season play after a one-year absence, overcame an 11-point Michigan lead in the final 8:09 of the game to win, 32–28. The Big 12's Cornhuskers were buoyed by the play of senior running back Cory Ross, who carried 28 times for 161 yards and a touchdown. Though he was intercepted twice, quarterback Zac Taylor managed an efficient game, completing only 14 passes but for 167 yards and three touchdowns. In defeat for the Big Ten's Wolverines, quarterback Chad Henne used his arm (230 yards passing, three touchdowns) and legs (fourth-quarter rushing touchdown) to give Michigan a 28–17 lead, taking advantage of excellent field position provided by kickoff returners Steve Breaston and Carl Tabb II, who averaged 35 yards per return. Nebraska rallied, though, scoring two touchdowns and adding a two-point conversion on two three-play drives each of under 40 yards. The game's final play was a Henne pass to wide receiver Jason Avant, which the Wolverines followed by eight laterals, eventually reaching the Nebraska 17-yard-line; the play brought to mind the 1982 Stanford-California game in which, similarly, players from each team streamed onto the field during the last play, thinking the game to be over, and much of the blame for the confusion was later assessed to the officials, who were provided by the Sun Belt Conference. It also brought to mind the 2002 Kentucky-LSU game as Nebraska players gave their coach the Gatorade dunk before the final play had ended. Though the two offenses combined to score 60 points, neither was superb; Michigan averaged only 4.1 yards per play, committed three turnovers, and allowed five sacks, while Nebraska was only marginally better, gaining an average of 4.6 yards per play, committing two turnovers, and also allowing five sacks. The loss meant that the Michigan, who began the season ranked fourth in Associated Press writers' and USA Today coaches’ polls, would finish the year with a record of 7–5 and unranked in both polls. The Cornhuskers finished 24th in the writer's and coach's polls with a record of 8–4.

=== Music City Bowl ===
- Virginia (6–5) 34, Minnesota (7–4) 31

The Music City Bowl at The Coliseum in Nashville, Tennessee was the first of four games played on December 30, 2005. Virginia, representing the ACC in a slot forfeited by the SEC, which failed to qualify enough teams for bowl eligibility, came back from a second-quarter 14-point deficit to drive for a game-winning field goal with 1:08 to play, ultimately defeating the Big Ten's Minnesota, 34–31. The Cavaliers were paced by quarterback Marques Hagans, who threw for 359 yards and two touchdowns, and running back Wali Lundy, who ran for only 60 yards but added two touchdowns, including a game-tying score on a 72-yard drive with less than 10 minutes to go in the game. Golden Gophers quarterback Bryan Cupito shined in defeat, completing 65 percent of his passes for 267 yards and four touchdowns (including two to wide receiver Jared Ellerson), as Minnesota took a 21–7 lead with less than seven minutes to go in the second quarter. Virginia kicker Connor Hughes added a field goal as the half ended to bring the Cavaliers within 11, and he came through again with a 39-yarder to give Virginia the lead for good; Hughes finished with ten points. Although Minnesota finished with a nearly seven-minute edge in time of possession, thanks in part to the running of Laurence Maroney and Gary Russell, who combined for 190 yards on 49 carries, and to forcing two Virginia turnovers in the fourth quarter, the Golden Gopher defense allowed the Wahoos to drive from their own three-yard line to record the final field goal and break the tie. Cupito led a last-minute drive for Minnesota, crossing midfield with 37 seconds to go before throwing an end-zone interception that allowed Virginia to run out the clock.

=== Sun Bowl ===
- UCLA (9–2) 50, Northwestern (7–4) 38

The Sun Bowl at the eponymous stadium in El Paso, Texas was the second game of four that were played on December 30, and matched Big Ten (Northwestern) and Pac-10 (UCLA) teams for the only time this bowl season; the Bruins upended the Wildcats, 50–38, to finish the season with a 10–2 record. While the game was the scoring showcase expected, especially in the first half, when the teams combined for a Sun Bowl-record 51 points, each team departed in several areas from its typical play, making for a game of surprises. UCLA quarterback Drew Olson, who had finished eighth in the voting for the 2005 Heisman Trophy, threw three interceptions (two of which were returned by the Wildcats for touchdowns), matching his total for the entire regular season, when he threw 31 touchdowns. Northwestern kicker Joel Howells, who had made 44 of 45 extra points in the regular season, missed two, as well a field goal, before giving way to back up Amado Villarreal. The Bruins had two rushers top 100 yards, and neither was Maurice Jones-Drew, who had had more than double the rushing yards of any teammate during the regular season; freshman Kahlil Bell and sophomore Chris Markey, neither of whom had topped 100 yards in any regular season game, though, shined, running for 293 yards on 42 carries. Finally, Wildcats freshman running back Tyrell Sutton, the 2005 Sporting News NCAA freshman of the year, was held to 82 yards rushing by a UCLA defense that ranked 110th in the country. The first half was one of streaks, as Northwestern saw a 22–0 lead, two touchdowns of which were returns of Olson interceptions, equaled and then eclipsed as Bell rushed for two scores and Olson threw a touchdown with just 29 seconds in the half to give UCLA a seven-point lead midway through the game. UCLA continued its offensive progress in the third quarter, as Olson threw a third touchdown just six minutes in, putting UCLA up by fourteen; the Bruins had again taken advantage of good field position off a Wildcats punt, with Northwestern's Ryan Pederson's averaging but 30.8 yards per punt on the day. Northwestern slowly cut into the Bruins lead as quarterback Brett Basanez led his team on two scoring drives, finishing the game with 437 yards passing and one touchdown on 71 passing attempts; Basanez, though, did throw two interceptions. After a Mark Philmore touchdown reception cut the UCLA lead to four with 2:29 remaining in the game, UCLA kick returner Brandon Breazell returned the ensuing kickoff 42 yards for a touchdown. Basanez led a final drive deep into UCLA territory, connecting twice with Ross Lane, who finished the game as the Wildcats’ top receiver, with 135 yards on seven catches, and finally throwing a touchdown to Shaun Herbert with 23 seconds remaining; Breazell delivered a knockout blow, however, again returning an onside kick for a touchdown, and the Bruins held on for the 12-point win.

=== Independence Bowl ===
- Missouri (6–5) 38, South Carolina (7–4) 31

The third of the four games on December 30, 2005, was the Independence Bowl at Independence Stadium in Shreveport, Louisiana. South Carolina, representing the SEC, took an early 21-point lead but was unable to hold off a late charge from Missouri, representing the Big 12, which notched a 38–31 win, denying South Carolina coach Steve Spurrier a bowl win in his first season back in college football. The Gamecocks scored on their first possession and recovered a Missouri fumble on the Tigers’ first play from scrimmage, setting up a five-yard touchdown scamper by running back Mike Davis. A second touchdown pass by quarterback Blake Mitchell gave South Carolina a 21–0 lead just six minutes into the game, and after a series of punts, the Gamecocks took the ball on a short field and reached the Missouri 16-yard-line when a Mitchell pass was intercepted by senior Marcus King, who returned his pick 98 yards for Missouri's first score of the game. Davis, who finished the day with 124 yards on 19 carries, added his second touchdown on the ensuing drive, but Missouri option quarterback Brad Smith, who was his team's leading passer (21 completions for 283 yards) and rusher (16 carries for 138 yards), drove the Tigers 74 yards in 1:33 before hitting freshman tight end Chase Coffman, his leading receiver, who finished with eight catches for 99 yards, on a five-yard touchdown pass, cutting the Tigers’ halftime deficit to 14. Smith took the Tigers down the field once more to open the third quarter, and, even after Missouri wasted a 76-yard drive when kicker Adam Crossett missed a 22-yard field goal, the Missouri defense forced a punt and Smith engineered an 85-yard drive capped by his 31-yard rushing touchdown. A Derrick Ming interception of a Mitchell pass in Gamecocks territory led to another Smith rushing score, and Crossett atoned for his earlier miss by hitting a 50-yard field goal early in the fourth quarter to give the Tigers their first lead of the game. Mitchell responded with a long drive of his own, hitting freshman wide receiver Sidney Rice, his top target in the game (catching 13 passes for 202 yards and a touchdown), three times en route to a 30-yard Josh Brown field goal. Working against a fatigued Gamecocks defense, which faced a total of 76 Missouri plays on the day, Smith shined on the ground once more, recording a 59-yard run and capping his day with a third rushing touchdown, this from one yard out. Although freshman kick returner Carlos Thomas once more gave the Gamecocks good field position, returning the Missouri kick 43 yards to bring his return average on the day to 31 yards, Mitchell threw his third interception of the day, allowing Mizzou to run out the clock.

=== Meineke Car Care Bowl ===
- North Carolina State (6–5) 14, South Florida (6–5) 0

The Meineke Car Care Bowl at Bank of America Stadium in Charlotte, North Carolina was the first of three scheduled games played on December 31, 2005. North Carolina State, representing the ACC, defeated South Florida, which was making its first bowl appearance in its first year as a member of the Big East, 14–0. A scoreless first quarter set the tone for a game in which neither team played well offensively; each team punted twice and neither team could take advantage of a scoring chance, as the Bulls missed a 47-yard field goal on their first possession of the game and the Wolfpack failed to put points on the board after taking over the ball at midfield on a Marcus Hudson blocked punt. The NC State offense came alive in the second quarter as sophomore quarterback Marcus Stone, assuming the starting role from senior Jay Davis, hit wide receiver Brian Clark, who was his team's leading receiver with two catches for 50 yards, for a 9-yard touchdown and ran for another, giving the Wolfpack a 14–0 halftime lead. The teams reprised their offensive ineptitude in the third quarter, however, as Bulls backup quarterback Carlton Hill fumbled the ball to NC State, only to see Hudson lose a fumble on the next play; Hill fumbled once more two plays later as possession changed hands three times in four plays. Only South Florida managed sustained drives in the fourth quarter, as running back Andre Hall keyed an attack that reached the NC State 17-yard line before quarterback Pat Julmiste threw an interception, ending the Bulls’ scoring chance—a fake punt netted South Florida a first-down in Wolfpack territory with less than five minutes to play, but they turned the ball over on downs and failed to threaten again until the waning seconds of the game. Even as he completed only nine of 19 passes for 127 yards, Wolfpack quarterback Marcus Stone outshone his South Florida counterpart, and Julmiste completed just eight of 25 passes for 94 yards—with two-thirds of his total coming with less than two minutes to play—as he was outplayed by the freshman Hill, who completed one of two passes for 37 yards but was nevertheless pulled from the game after the second of his fumbles. The running of Hall, the Big East's leading rusher during the regular season, kept South Florida within striking distance, as he overcame a slow start to finish with 130 yards on 21 carries. In general, though, each defense played well, not only forcing fumbles but pressuring the passer; NC State totaled seven sacks, including three by linebacker Stephen Tulloch, and South Florida notched three, all by defensive end Terrence Royal. Running back Toney Baker helped the Wolfpack to run time off the clock in the fourth quarter and win the time-of-possession battle by nearly four minutes; he finished the day with 90 yards on 23 carries as NC State's two second-quarter scores proved to be enough for the win. The Bulls were shut out for the first time since the program started in 1997.

=== Liberty Bowl ===
- Tulsa (8–4) 31, Fresno State (8–4) 24

The Liberty Bowl at the Memorial Stadium which bears its name in Memphis, Tennessee was the second game played on December 31. Fresno State, out of the WAC, failed to end a three-game losing streak that began when the Bulldogs fell by only eight to the top-ranked team in the nation, Southern California, losing to C-USA champion (and former WAC rival) Tulsa, 31–24. Although better known for their passing offenses, each team recorded its first two scores on the ground, as the Bulldogs took a 7–0 first quarter lead on the strength of a seven-yard run carry by senior running back Wendell Mathis, who finished the day with 31 carries for 117 yards. The Golden Hurricane answered quickly and then took the lead in the second quarter as Uril Parrish and Tarrion Adams each recorded a touchdown; Adams finished as Tulsa's leading rusher, accumulating 103 yards on 11 carries. Fresno State tied the game on a Bryson Sumlin touchdown scamper with 1:14 to play—Sumlin would finish the game with 66 yards on 10 carries—in the first half before a 40-yard Brad DeVault field goal gave Tulsa a three-point halftime lead, even as the Golden Hurricane had possessed the ball for fewer than ten minutes in game's first half. Behind the play of senior quarterback Paul Pinegar, who threw efficiently if unremarkably (19 completions in 30 attempts for 215 yards), the Bulldogs tied the game early in the third quarter with a Kyle Zimmerman 27-yard field goal. Adams was tackled for a loss on a fourth-down attempt to give Fresno State the ball at the Tulsa 37-yard line, but Mathis was held for short gains by a stout Tulsa defense and Zimmerman eventually missed a field goal from 27 yards out. Golden Hurricane quarterback Paul Smith, who finished the game completing 18 of 27 passes for 236 yards, finally found senior tight end Garrett Mills, who this season broke the career receiving yards mark for a tight end in Division I-A, for productive yards in the third quarter, though Mills nevertheless finished with only four catches on the day, as Tulsa reached midfield before wide receiver Ashlan Davis fumbled the ball, committing Tulsa's only turnover; in a drive that ran more than five minutes off the clock and took the game into the fourth quarter, Fresno State capitalized, as Pinegar drove the Bulldogs 72 yards and hit wide receiver Joe Fernandez for a 21-yard touchdown, giving Fresno State a 7-point lead. Tulsa's inability to possess the ball for long stretches bade well for Fresno State, but Davis atoned for his fumble midway through the fourth quarter as he caught a Smith pass and scored from 55 yards to tie the game; Davis finished the day as the leading Tulsa receiver, catching eight passes for 129 yards. Pinegar led another Bulldogs drive but was intercepted near midfield by Golden Hurricane sophomore defensive back Anthony Germany, as Tulsa, despite having run only 55 plays (to Fresno State's 77) and having possessed the ball for only 20:44, took the lead for good on a four-yard touchdown run by Smith, as a second Pinegar interception with 2:03 to play clinched the win for the Golden Hurricane. Though they ran few plays, Tulsa made them count, averaging 7.0 yards per carry on their running plays as they ran their record to 9–4, defeating the Bulldogs for the first time in five tries.

=== Houston Bowl ===
- TCU (10–1) 27, Iowa State (7–4) 24

The last of three December 31 games that were contested on New Year's Eve was the Houston Bowl at Reliant Stadium in Houston, Texas. Mountain West champion Texas Christian, filling a slot reserved for the SEC, which failed to qualify enough teams for bowl eligibility, tallied a 27–24 win over Iowa State, representing the Big 12. The Horned Frogs, bidding to finish the year as the only team from a BCS non-AQ conference to be ranked in the top 25 in the USA Today coaches’ and AP writers’ polls, took a 14-point lead over the Cyclones just 6:36 into the game, as junior tailback Robert Merrill scored on a 20-yard run on TCU's first possession; Merrill finished the day as his team's top rusher, gaining 109 yards on just 11 carries. Setting the tone for a game in which each defense would make several key plays, cornerback Drew Coleman recovered an Iowa State fumble on the second play of the ensuing possession, and TCU capitalized in 56 seconds as freshman running back Aaron Brown took one of his 12 carries for a touchdown. Soon after Iowa State defensive back LaMarcus Hicks evened the turnover battle, intercepting TCU quarterback Ballard at midfield to set up the first of two touchdown receptions by wide receiver Todd Blythe, who finished as the leading Cyclones receiver with 105 yards on only five receptions, Cyclones defensive end Brent Curvey sacked Ballard and then halted a running play in the end zone, giving Iowa State a safety. Two minutes and twenty seconds later, Iowa State quarterback Bret Meyer, who totaled 20 completions on 33 attempts for 254 yards, threw the second of his three touchdowns, hitting receiver Jon Davis from six yards; a successful two-point conversion, a pass from Meyer to tight end Ben Barkema, gave the Cyclones a three-point lead. After the teams exchanged punts, Meyer turned the ball over again, fumbling to David Roach, and Ballard, who completed 21 of his 33 passes for 275 yards, playing similarly to Meyer and foreshadowing the game's close end, hit junior wide receiver Michael DePriest for an 84-yard touchdown. Though each defense tightened at the end of the first half, TCU took advantage of good field position conferred by a 39-yard punt return as kicker Chris Manfredini made a 29-yard field goal to give the Horned Frogs a seven-point halftime lead. Each defense held the opposing offense for most of the third quarter, as the teams combined in the game for 12 sacks (defensive end Chase Ortiz led TCU with two; defensive end Jason Berryman had four for Iowa State), before Meyer again hit Blythe for a touchdown, this time from 22 yards, as the Cyclones tied the game late in the third quarter. Even as each team lost a fumble in the fourth quarter, neither was able to mount a substantial drive, but the inability of Iowa State to run the ball on TCU (eayer was his team's leading rusher, gaining 27 of the Cyclones’ 35 yards on 12 carries) allowed the Horned Frogs to win the time-of-possession battle by seven minutes, and the Cyclones defense tired late in the game, allowing TCU to drive 49 yards in 3:42 as kicker Peter LoCoco made his first field goal since October 8, a 49-yarder that gave TCU its winning margin; the Horned Frogs defense held Iowa State scoreless the rest of the way. In winning a poorly executed game in which the teams totaled 20 penalties and seven turnovers, TCU cut the record of BCS AQ conference teams against BCS non-AQ conference teams to 3–2 in what was the last game to be played between BCS AQ and non-AQ teams of the 2005 bowl season. The game was also the last under the "Houston Bowl" banner; after the season, the marketing arm of the Houston Texans, Lone Star Sports and Entertainment, took over the game and renamed it the Texas Bowl.

== Non-BCS New Year's Day Bowls ==
Because New Year's Day 2006 fell on a Sunday, a day when the NFL plays most of its games, the league played all but two of its final regular season games that day, and all college football bowl games traditionally held that day were moved to January 2, which fell on a Monday.

These games are generally considered to be the more important of the non-BCS bowls, with half — the AT&T Cotton Bowl Classic, the Toyota Gator Bowl and the Capital One Bowl — broadcast on over-the-air television rather than cable (namely ESPN), and with these six games' having larger-than-average purses; in 2005, for example, the Toyota Gator Bowl paid the lowest purse of the sextet, which, at $1.6 million still more than doubled the $750,000 purse standard for most non-New Year's Day bowls, while the Capital One Bowl handed out the largest non-BCS purse at roughly $5,312,000.

All records shown are pre-bowl game.

=== Holiday Bowl ===
- Oklahoma (7–4) 17, Oregon (10–1) 14

The Holiday Bowl, which as of 2005 became the second post-season college football game played at Qualcomm Stadium in San Diego, California, is considered to be part of this group in spite of the fact that the game is not played on New Year's Day, given the bowl's payout of $2,000,000 and the frequency with which highly ranked teams participate. The 2005 edition was the second of two games played on December 29, 2005, with the Big 12's Oklahoma Sooners defeating the Pac-10's Oregon Ducks, 17–14, in a matchup of teams each with something to prove. The Ducks were playing to show that they deserved a BCS bowl bid, having gone 10–1 during the regular season (the only loss coming to the nation's top-ranked team, Southern California), while the Sooners, who had lost in the BCS championship game each of the past two years, were trying to show that they really were the team that came into the season ranked fifth in the USA Today coaches' poll and seventh in the AP writers' poll than the team that lost to Texas by 33. Although Oregon got off to an early 7–3 lead and held that lead for nearly half the game, 22:38, the offense was unable to muster much against an Oklahoma defense that recorded four sacks (two by junior defensive end C.J. Ah You), held the Ducks to 2.6 yards per carry, and allowed only six third-down conversions in 18 attempts. Rotating between Dennis Dixon and Brady Leaf (whose brother, Ryan, was once the quarterback for the San Diego Chargers and played in said stadium) at quarterback, as they had done since losing starter Kellen Clemens earlier in the year, the Ducks gained 244 passing yards on 44 attempts, but much of that came in the fourth quarter as the Sooners defense tired during two extended drives. Oregon managed little success on the ground, with their top rusher, senior Terrence Whitehead, going for only 42 yards. Oklahoma's offense played largely efficiently, gaining 365 yards, with redshirt freshman quarterback Rhett Bomar completing 59 percent of his passes for 229 yards and one touchdown (freshman Malcolm Kelly was the team's top receiver, hauling in seven Bomar throws for 78 yards). Sophomore Adrian Peterson led the way on the ground, accumulating 79 yards on 23 carries. In spite of their general success, Bomar and Peterson each provided Oregon hope, with Bomar's throwing an interception and Peterson's fumbling within a yard of the goal line. The Ducks, trailing by 10 points in the fourth quarter, were unable to convert a first-down in the shadow of their own goal posts against the aggressive Sooners defense and thus failed to capitalize on the Peterson turnover. Their defense, though, stymied every Oklahoma drive in the fourth quarter, getting two more possessions for the offense, and Oregon drove 81 yards in 14 plays, with Brady Leaf's hitting Tim Day for a three-yard touchdown. Once more the Sooners offense failed to convert a third-down on their ensuing possession as the Ducks defense tightened, and, behind a resurgent Leaf, Oregon drove to the Oklahoma 19-yard-line before Sooners senior linebacker Clint Ingram intercepted a Leaf pass to seal the victory for the Sooners.

On July 11, 2007, following an investigation into the use of two players being used in a fake job scandal by Sooner boosters, the NCAA announced that the game, along with eight victories from the 2005 regular season would be stricken from the record books. However, the NCAA reversed its field on February 22, 2008, and restored all eight forfeited wins to the record books, including the Holiday Bowl. Since bowl games are not sanctioned by the NCAA, Oklahoma was allowed to keep their payout.

=== Peach Bowl ===
- LSU (10–2) 40, Miami (Florida) (9–2) 3

The Peach Bowl at the Georgia Dome in Atlanta, like the Holiday Bowl, is not played on New Year's Day but is considered part of this group, given shared characteristics: a large payout and the participation of highly ranked teams. This year's game was the nightcap of four contests played on December 30, 2005, the first game of three in the span of four days at the facility, and matched the ACC's Miami (Florida), who were the defending champions of this game, and the SEC's LSU. The game was expected to be competitive and low-scoring, given that each team was ranked in top ten in the AP writers’ and USA Today coaches’ polls and that each ranked amongst the top six in Division I-A in total defense.

The outcome, though, was anything but close as the Hurricanes struck first with a field goal six-plus minutes into the game and then watched as the Tigers, led by sophomore quarterback Matt Flynn, who replaced the injured JaMarcus Russell after having thrown only 15 passes all year, scored 40 points on eight straight possessions to claim a 40–3 win. Flynn played efficiently for LSU, which was coming of an upset by Georgia in the SEC championship game, played four weeks earlier in that same stadium, completing 13 of 22 passes for 197 yards and two touchdowns, including a 51-yard strike to wide receiver Craig Davis, who was the leading Tigers receiver with five catches for 100 yards. The ground game, however, was LSU's best weapon, as the Tigers possessed the ball for 39:08 and accumulated 282 rushing yards, averaging 5.1 yards per carry against a Hurricanes defense that came into the game having allowed more than 17 points only once during the regular season. Running back Joseph Addai led the way with 24 carries for 128 yards and one touchdown; fullback Jacob Hester and added 66 yards and one touchdown on 13 carries. The Tigers kicking game also added in the scoring, as Colt David made four extra points and Chris Jackson connected on four field goals, including a 50-yarder to end LSU scoring, and participated in a fake field goal the Tigers used to convert a first down already up 31.

The Hurricanes turned the ball over only once, as freshman quarterback Kirby Freeman entered the game with Miami down 37 and promptly threw an interception, but they allowed LSU to sack quarterback Kyle Wright four times; pressure and tight coverage led to Wright's making only 10 of 21 passes for just 99 yards. Neither was the running game able to get any traction for Miami, as the Hurricanes averaged just 2.0 yards per carry, with leading rusher sophomore Charlie Jones recording only 49 yards on eight carries, 42 of that on one run.

The loss was the worst in post-season history for the Hurricanes. The contest, the last to be termed the "Peach Bowl" (the game was renamed the "Chick-fil-A Bowl" after the season), was marred by a postgame scuffle in which an ersatz fight between Tigers and Hurricanes players was ostensibly misunderstood by several Hurricanes, who initiated actual physical contact, necessitating the intervention of Georgia State Patrol officers and medical treatment for Miami offensive lineman Andrew Bain, who was reported to have been briefly unconscious, but was instead dazed after being hit in the head by a helmet.

=== Outback Bowl ===
- Florida (8–3) 31, Iowa (7–4) 24

The Outback Bowl at Raymond James Stadium in Tampa, Florida was the first of the six traditional New Year's Day games played on January 2, 2006, as Florida, representing the SEC, avenged a 2004 Outback Bowl loss to Big Ten representative Iowa, taking an early 17–0 lead and then holding off a late Hawkeyes run to win 31–24, giving coach Urban Meyer a bowl victory (his third straight bowl victory in a row; the first two coming in the 2003 Liberty Bowl and the 2005 Fiesta Bowl with Utah) and a 9–3 record in his first season with the Gators. The teams matched up fairly evenly defensively, but special teams and defensive touchdowns made the difference for the Gators, who took a 7–0 lead just 1:35 into the game when Tremaine McCollum returned a block eight yards for a touchdown. Behind junior quarterback Chris Leak, who finished the day having completed 27 of 42 passes for 305 yards and two touchdowns, the Gators constructed two 70-plus-yard drives in the first and second quarters, but came away with only three points as the Iowa defense tightened and kicker Chris Hetland made only one of two field goal attempts. Florida senior cornerback Vernell Brown, forcing the game's only turnover, intercepted Iowa quarterback Drew Tate with less than two minutes to play in the first half and returned his catch 60 yards for a touchdown. Iowa responded immediately, taking advantage of a 47-yard kickoff return by Damian Sims, as Tate found wide receiver Clinton Solomon, who finished the day as Tate's leading receiver, catching seven passes for 97 yards, for a 20-yard touchdown, bringing the Hawkeyes within ten. The Gators, though, returned their halftime lead to 17 when Leak drove his team 70 yards in 1:09, finally hitting senior wide receiver Dallas Baker, his top target on the day (10 catches for 148 yards), for a 24-yard touchdown as time expired. In a third quarter in which each team punted twice and the Hawkeyes missed a field goal, Florida extended its lead once more, as Leak threw a touchdown to Baker, this one from 38 yards; with just over 17 minutes to play, the Gators led by 24. Even as Florida had success on the ground in the game, rushing 42 times for 169 yards (led by freshman running back Kestahn Moore, who went for 87 yards on 13 carries), the Gators were unable to sustain clock-consuming drives in the fourth quarter, twice turning the ball over on downs, and Tate engineered a comeback, hitting senior wide receiver Ed Hinkel, who caught nine passes for 87 yards on the day, for two touchdowns in 6:52, benefiting from a Gators lost fumble on the Florida five-yard line, to bring the Hawkeyes to within 10 with seven minutes to play. Tate, who finished with impressive passing numbers despite his having thrown an interception (32 of 55 passes completed for 346 yards and three touchdowns), connected twice with tight end Scott Chandler, who became the third Hawkeyes receiver to top 80 yards for the game (88, on seven catches), on the final Hawkeyes drive to set up a Kyle Schlicher 45-yard field goal. Iowa recovered an onside kick, but an Iowa player was ruled to have been offsides by the officials assigned by Conference USA for the game. Television replays would later show that no Iowa player was offsides, to the considerable dismay of Hawkeyes coach Kirk Ferentz. Florida recovered the ensuing retry and ran the clock out, leaving Iowa just short in its comeback effort and dropping the Hawkeyes’ record to 7–5 for the season.

=== Cotton Bowl Classic ===
- Alabama (9–2) 13, Texas Tech (9–2) 10

The Cotton Bowl Classic, played at the eponymous stadium in Dallas, Texas as the second of the six contests on January 2, saw Alabama, representing the SEC, defeat Big 12 opponent Texas Tech, 13–10. In a matchup of the Crimson Tide's first-ranked scoring defense and the Red Raiders’ second-ranked scoring offense, Alabama held Texas Tech to ten points, thanks to numerous pressures and four sacks of Texas Tech senior quarterback Cody Hodges, who completed only 15 of 32 passes for 191 yards and was knocked out of the game for a period in the second half. The Alabama defense was assisted by an efficient offense that controlled the ball much of the game and kept the defense off the field; Alabama ultimately possessed the ball for 38:56, largely thanks to the rushing of Kenneth Darby, who notched 83 yards on 29 carries. In fact, it was the Alabama offense that finally secured the win for the Crimson Tide, as quarterback Brodie Croyle, who completed 19 of 31 passes for 275 yards, drove his team 55 yards late in the fourth quarter to set up kicker Jamie Christensen's 46-yard game-winning field goal. Alabama struck first, scoring less than four minutes into the game as Croyle hit sophomore wide receiver Keith Brown for a 76-yard touchdown; Brown finished as Croyle's top target, gaining 142 yards on five catches. An Alex Trlica 34-yard field goal brought Texas Tech to within four, and the teams traded blocked field goals to end the first half; Christensen also missed a field goal from 38 yards early in the second quarter but the two kicks he made were more significant than the two he missed. Though the Crimson Tide defense kept the Red Raiders in check most of the second half, Hodges engineered late drives for Texas Tech, using both his legs (he finished as his team's top rusher, gaining 93 yards on 13 carries) and arm. He eventually hit Jarrett Hicks for a game-tying touchdown. The Red Raiders defense, though, could not stop Croyle, and the Crimson Tide came away with a win in their first Cotton Bowl Classic appearance since 1982. The walk-off field goal by Christensen was the first game-ending score in the game since 1979, when Joe Montana brought Notre Dame from behind to defeat Houston.

In a humorous moment following the game at a press conference, Mike Shula, Alabama's coach, fell off the platform where he was sitting on, then got back up and stated "I hope that ESPN didn't film that." Too late for him, they showed that on SportsCenter that night.

=== Gator Bowl ===
- Virginia Tech (10–2) 35, Louisville (9–2) 24

The third of the six traditional New Year's Day contests played on January 2, 2006, was the Gator Bowl at Alltel Stadium in Jacksonville, Florida. Having left the Big East two years earlier to join the ACC, Virginia Tech defeated Louisville, which was playing in its first year of Big East membership, 35–24. In spite of the difference in their styles (Louisville entered the game with the nation's third-ranked offense and Virginia Tech brought the third-ranked defense), each team entered the game with a similar goal: successfully finishing a season marred by the disappointment of exclusion from the BCS bowl games (Louisville was widely expected to claim the Big East crown and thus an automatic bid, and Virginia Tech was heavily favored to win the ACC championship game, which was played at ALLTEL four weeks earlier against Florida State). Starting just his second game for the Cardinals after the injury of Big East passing leader Brian Brohm, Louisville quarterback Hunter Cantwell excelled early, driving his team 77 yards in 3:59 and hitting freshman wide receiver Mario Urrutia, his top target on the day (six catches for 95 yards), for an 11-yard touchdown. After Brandon Pace made a 36-yard field goal for the Hokies, Cantwell led another long drive, this one 80 yards, and connected with wide receiver Joshua Tinch for a 39-yard touchdown to give the Cardinals an 11-point lead. After neither offense sustained progress for much of the second quarter, the Hokies pressuring defense (Virginia Tech sacked Cantwell four times on the day) forced a turnover as cornerback Roland Minor intercepted Cantwell near midfield; Virginia Tech took advantage, as quarterback Marcus Vick hit wide receiver Justin Harper for a 33-yard touchdown, cutting the Hokies’ halftime deficit to seven. In a third quarter marked by defensive toughness, only the Hokies managed to score, taking the ball on their own one-yard line and driving 88 yards, largely behind running backs Brandon Ore and Cedric Humes, who combined to gain 166 yards on 32 carries, before a Louisville defensive stand forced them to settle for another Pace field goal. In a span of 66 seconds early in the fourth quarter, each team scored a touchdown, as Gary Barnidge caught a 29-yard Cantwell pass and Humes ran 24 yards before the Hokies added a two-point conversion to cut the Louisville lead to three points. An opportunistic Virginia Tech defense contained Louisville back Michael Bush in the fourth quarter (he gained 94 yards on 16 carries for the game) and took advantage of Cantwell's inexperience, forcing a fumble (off of which Vick threw a two-yard touchdown to Jeff King, finishing his day with 11 completions in 21 attempts for 204 yards) and then recording an interception which James Anderson returned 40 yards for a touchdown to give Virginia Tech the 11-point margin by which they would eventually win; the defense sealed the victory with a third interception of Cantwell (who finished the game having completed only 42 percent of his passes) and, behind Humes, the Hokies ran out the clock. After the game, video showed Vick, ostensibly intentionally, stepping on the leg of Louisville defensive end Elvis Dumervil; though none of the Big 12 officiating crew saw the play as it happened, the head referee, upon seeing a replay of the play, indicated that he would have ejected Vick had he seen the play. On January 6, Hokies coach Frank Beamer announced that Vick had been dismissed from the team; Vick later announced that, in lieu of transferring to another Division I-A school, after which he would have had to sit out one year, or to a Division I-AA, II, or III school, whereupon he could play immediately, he would forgo his senior season, declaring his eligibility for the 2006 NFL draft.

=== Capital One Bowl ===
- Wisconsin (9–3) 24, Auburn (9–2) 10

The Capital One Bowl, the second post-season game played at the Citrus Bowl Stadium in Orlando, Florida was the fourth played on January 2, 2006, and the final non-BCS game. Wisconsin, playing its final game for coach Barry Alvarez and representing the Big Ten, defeated Auburn, an SEC representative which a year ago finished its season undefeated but left out of the BCS championship game, 24–10. The Badgers recovered two Auburn turnovers in the game's first four minutes, intercepting quarterback Brandon Cox and forcing a fumble by running back Kenny Irons, but failed to score on short fields, punting once and missing a 53-yard field goal. It was when faced with poor field position, however, that the Wisconsin offense came alive, and, midway through the first quarter, quarterback John Stocco took the team 75 yards in just 57 seconds, connecting with Brandon Williams on a 30-yard pass for a touchdown to give the Badgers a seven-point lead; Williams was Stocco's leading receiver on the day, catching six passes for 173 yards. A tough Badgers defense, which sacked Cox four times on the day, forced an Auburn punt and the offense, behind a 61-yard carry by running back Brian Calhoun, who carried for 214 yards on 30 carries for the game, shredding the Auburn run defense, got to the two-yard line before stalling and settling for a 19-yard Taylor Mehlhaff field goal. Irons, who had been held below 100 yards in just two games during the regular season, managed little traction against Wisconsin, finishing the day with just 87 yards on 22 carries; the inability of Irons to get a first down ended two Auburn drives in the second quarter and led to a 12-play, 86-yard drive that culminated in Stocco's hitting Owen Daniels for a 13-yard touchdown, giving the Badgers a 17-point halftime lead. Stocco, committing the only Badgers turnover of the game, fumbled in the third quarter, giving Auburn the ball at the Wisconsin 18-yard line, but the Tigers were held to a 19-yard John Vaughn field goal, after which the teams traded punts to close the third quarter. Cox, who finished the day having completed only 45 percent of his passes for just 138 yards, led the Tigers on one final long drive, going 56 yards in 14 plays and hitting Courtney Taylor with a nine-yard touchdown pass; the drive was twice kept alive with third-down completions to senior wide receiver Ben Obomanu, who led the Tigers in receiving with five catches for 62 yards. The Badgers answered just 1:27 later, as Calhoun ran 33 yards for a touchdown to put the Badgers up by 14 points. After the Wisconsin defense held the Tigers at midfield, the Badgers took the ensuing possession, largely through the running of Calhoun, 98 yards to the Auburn one-yard line before allowing time to expire, securing Alvarez, who will continue in his role as the school's athletic director, his fourth season of double-digit wins. Defensive coordinator Bret Bielema assumed head coaching duties in 2006, and led them back to the game.

== Bowl Championship Series games ==
The purse for each BCS game was $14,998,000. All records shown are pre-bowl game.

=== Fiesta Bowl ===
- Ohio State (9–2) 34, Notre Dame (9–2) 20

The first BCS Game, the Fiesta Bowl at Sun Devil Stadium in Tempe, Arizona is the fifth of six traditional games that were played on January 2, 2006, in the time usually reserved for the Rose Bowl, which served as the national championship game. In a battle of BCS at-large selections, Ohio State University defeated Notre Dame, 34–20, in the last Fiesta Bowl to be played at Sun Devil Stadium. The Fighting Irish, an independent program, struck first, capping a six-play, 72-yard drive with a 20-yard touchdown run by sophomore running back Darius Walker, but the Buckeyes, representing the Big Ten, of which they were co-champion, tied the game just three minutes later as junior quarterback Troy Smith hit speedy sophomore Ted Ginn Jr., for a 56-yard reception. The Irish soon had another scoring chance, as Smith was sacked and fumbled on the Ohio State 15-yard line; Walker, though, was held in check by the Ohio State defense, and a fourth-down conversion attempt was stuffed by Buckeyes linebacker A. J. Hawk, who recorded the first of his two sacks (senior defensive end Mike Kudla recorded three). Off of the defensive stop, the Ohio State offense rolled behind Ginn once more, as he caught an 18-yard Smith pass and then carried the ball himself 68 yards for a touchdown; Ginn finished the day with two carries for 73 yards and eight catches for 168 yards. After Notre Dame punted on its first second-quarter possession, Smith again led his team down the field, often using his legs (he finished the day with 11 carries for 76 yards), and Ohio State reached the Notre Dame 15-yard line before a second Smith fumble ended another Buckeyes scoring chance. Even as Notre Dame quarterback Brady Quinn, who finished fourth in 2005 Heisman Trophy balloting, connected twice on the ensuing drive with Maurice Stovall, who finished as the top Irish receiver with nine catches and 128 yards, the Buckeyes defense forced a punt from midfield and the offense then went 98 yards for a touchdown; the scoring play was an 85-yard touchdown heave from Smith to wide receiver Santonio Holmes, who had caught five passes for 124 yards at game's end. Quinn had little success against the Ohio State defense in the first half, and the ensuing Irish drive stalled, allowing the Buckeyes to regain possession and drive to the Notre Dame 11-yard line from which sixth-year senior kicker Josh Huston had a field goal attempt partially blocked; nevertheless, Ohio State held a 14-point lead at the half, buoyed by nearly 400 yards of total offense and three 50-plus-yard plays in the first half alone. As the Buckeyes stuck to the running game in the third quarter, sophomore running back Antonio Pittman became a featured part of the offense, helping his team to run nearly four minutes of the clock before a Huston field goal attempt from 46 yards was blocked, allowing Notre Dame to stay within 14 points of the Buckeyes. On a 71-yard drive in which senior wide receiver Matt Shelton caught three passes (of five for the game), Walker rushed for a 10-yard touchdown but kicker/punter D.J. Fitzpatrick missed the extra point, keeping Ohio State's lead at eight. On the strength of a 44-yard Ginn reception, the Buckeyes struck back just two minutes later, as Huston finally connected on a field goal attempt, this one from 40 yards. Huston added a 26-yard field goal with 10:13 to go in the game, once more stretching the Ohio State lead to 14. The Irish struck back but took 4:38 to do so as Quinn struggled to find his top receiver, Jeff Samardzija, who finished with six catches for only 59 yards; Walker's third touchdown, from five yards, brought Notre Dame to within seven with 5:20 to play in the game. Pittman ended any thoughts of an Irish comeback, though, when he ran 61 yards for a touchdown with 1:46 to play, taking his total for the game to 135 yards (on 20 carries); the Irish could get no closer than their 39-yard line the rest of the way as Ohio State won by 14 while compiling 541 yards of total offense and preventing first-year Irish head coach Charlie Weis from claiming a bowl victory. The win was the third in the Fiesta Bowl for Ohio State coach Jim Tressel, who saw his team defeat Miami (Florida), 31–24, in the double overtime 2003 edition, thereby claiming the 2002 national championship. As the second team in the BCS from the Big Ten, Ohio State earned an extra $4.5 million for its participation, while each of the six BCS conferences received an extra $1.7 million to be shared amongst their teams. Notre Dame, as an independent school without conference affiliation, kept its entire payout. The following season's game, along with the new stand-alone BCS title game, was moved to the new University of Phoenix Stadium in Glendale, Arizona.

=== Sugar Bowl ===
- West Virginia (10–1) 38, Georgia (10–2) 35

The Sugar Bowl, the second BCS bowl, and the final game of six played on January 2, 2006, was contested at the Georgia Dome in Atlanta, Georgia, having been, like the New Orleans Bowl, displaced from the Louisiana Superdome by Hurricane Katrina. West Virginia, representing the Big East as conference champion, upset Georgia, the winner of the SEC championship game, 38–35. Georgia was looking for its third straight win in Atlanta in as many appearances, having won its last regular season game (against rival Georgia Tech on the Tech campus) and the SEC championship game (over LSU) at the Georgia Dome, located near the Bulldogs' Athens, Georgia campus, but West Virginia took a 28–0 lead in the game's first 16 minutes and withstood a furious Georgia comeback before scoring late in the fourth quarter to secure the win. Mountaineers freshman running back Steve Slaton began a career day early, running for a 52-yard score just 2:48 into the game en route to accumulating 204 yards on 26 carries against a Bulldogs defense that entered the game having allowed only 3.5 yards per carry. On the subsequent West Virginia possession, freshman quarterback Pat White accounted 56 yards of a 64-yard scoring drive, connecting with wide receiver Darius Reynaud for a three-yard touchdown pass; Reynaud caught six passes for 50 yards on the day. Just two plays into the next Bulldogs drive, running back Danny Ware lost the first of what would be three Georgia fumbles on the day, and West Virginia took just five plays to go 26 yards, scoring a touchdown on a 13-yard Reynaud run. The Mountaineers defense stymied an additional Georgia drive and forced a fumble by Georgia quarterback D.J. Shockley, setting up a 50-yard drive that culminated in Slaton's second touchdown scamper, an 18-yarder that gave West Virginia a 28-point lead just 15:50 into the game. Shockley began to have success against the Mountaineers defense in the second quarter, completing three straight passes for a total of 46 yards before running back Kregg Lumpkin, who finished the day with 67 yards on nine carries, scored from 34 yards to put Georgia on the board. After their defense forced a West Virginia punt, the Bulldogs went 91 yards in just six plays, with Thomas Brown's scoring on a 52-yard run; Brown has held largely in check the remainder of the game, totaling only 78 yards on nine carries. A long run by West Virginia fullback Owen Schmitt, who finished the day having run for 80 yards on nine carries, set up a 27-yard Pat McAfee field goal, but Shockley, who finished the day having completed 20 of 33 passes for 278 yards and having gained 62 yards on eight carries, drove his team 80 yards in under five minutes and hit wide receiver Leonard Pope, who caught six passes for 52 yards on the day, from four yards to cut the West Virginia halftime lead to 10 points. After combining to give up more than 600 yards in total offense in the first half, both defenses tightened in the second half and although Brown lost a fumble to the Mountaineers, neither team managed a score until 1:44 remained in the third quarter when Shockley hit A.J. Bryant for a 34-yard touchdown to bring the Bulldogs to within three points. White continued to play well through air and on the ground in the fourth quarter, though, and led his team on an 80-yard drive that ended when Slaton ran for a 52-yard touchdown and once more extended the West Virginia lead to ten. For the game, White completed 11 of 14 passes for 124 yards—completing four passes for 64 yards to senior Brandon Myles, his leading receiver—but also added 79 yards on 24 carries in contributing to his team's 386-yard rushing performance. Shockley drove his team once more, connecting with Mohamed Massaquoi, whom he four times for 43 yards on the day, to convert a crucial third down and then finding Bryan McClendon, who caught three balls for 72 yards, on a 43-yard scoring drive. The Bulldogs defense held but West Virginia punter Phil Brady successfully carried out a fake punt and ran for a first down, allowing the Mountaineers, behind Slaton and White, to run out the clock, run their season to 11–1, and prevent the Big East from going winless in four bowls; South Florida, Rutgers, and Louisville had all lost earlier. The game was the final of three games hosted by the Georgia Dome in four days; the Chick-fil-A Peach Bowl was held on December 30, and an NFL contest between the Carolina Panthers and Atlanta Falcons was played on January 1, which the Panthers won 44–11. The game returned to New Orleans in 2007.

=== Orange Bowl ===
- Penn State (10–1) 26, Florida State (8–4) 23 (3 OT)

The third BCS game, the Orange Bowl, was played at Dolphin Stadium in Miami Gardens, Florida on January 3, 2006, and saw Big Ten co-champion Penn State defeat ACC championship game winner Florida State, 26–23, in a triple overtime game marked by tight defense, inconsistent offense, and streaky special teams. The Nittany Lions capped a season they began unranked in both the USA Today coaches’ and AP writers’ polls by winning a record 21st bowl game for coach Joe Paterno, at 79 the oldest coach in Division I-A and with 354 victories the second-winningest; Seminoles coach Bobby Bowden, at the age of 76, failed to add to his current Division I-A record of 359 victories (19 in bowls). Each coach was older than the game itself; this was the 72nd Orange Bowl held. Each team had four possessions during the first quarter, and only Penn State scored; running back Austin Scott, who led his team in rushing with 110 yards on 26 carries on the day, capped an eight-play, 85-yard drive with a two-yard touchdown run. The Nittany Lions failed to capitalize on a second-quarter interception thrown by Florida State quarterback Drew Weatherford, and Seminoles senior wide receiver Willie Reid, who gave his team excellent field position on several drives, averaging 25.7 yards over seven punt returns, returned a Jeremy Kapinos punt 87 yards for a touchdown, tying the game at seven with 4:09 to play in the first half. After a defensive stop, the Florida State offense scored in one play, as Weatherford hit running back Lorenzo Booker, who finished with three catches for 69 yards, for a 57-yard touchdown; kicker Gary Cismesia, however, missed the extra point, and so a 25-yard scoring pass by quarterback Michael Robinson to wide receiver Ethan Kilmer, who accumulated six receptions totaling 79 yards on the day, gave Penn State a 14–13 halftime lead. Each defense controlled the opposing offense in the third quarter, and the longest drive achieved was one of 19 yards. Each defense played well throughout the game, and the teams combined to convert only 11 of 38 third down attempts. As Florida State faced a third down at its own seven-yard line early in the fourth quarter, Weatherford was penalized for intentional grounding while in the end zone, and Penn State was assessed a safety, giving the Nittany Lions a 16–13 lead. Weatherford was pressured by Penn State much of the day as the Nittany Lions defense stopped the Florida State running game early (senior running back Leon Washington gained just 30 yards on six carries to lead his team and overall the Seminoles averaged just 1.0 yards per carry), but finished the day with serviceable numbers, having completed 24 of 43 passes for 258 yards; Reid was his favorite target as he caught four passes for 55 yards. Penn State took possession off the free kick at the Florida State 47-yard line, and Robinson drove his team to the five-yard line before fumbling; the loose ball was recovered by the Seminoles. Robinson was active as a passer for the game, completing 21 of 39 throws for 253 yards, but he was held in check by the Seminoles rush defense, gaining only 21 yards on his 17 carries. Weatherford drove the Seminoles to the Penn State 30-yard line, converting a crucial third-down with a 39-yard pass to wide receiver Chris Davis, who caught three passes for 55 yards in the game, before the Nittany Lions defense tightened, and Cismesia made a 48-yard field goal to tie the game at 16. On the ensuing Penn State possession, Robinson drove his team to the Florida State 12-yard line—the key play was a 38-yard pass play to wide receiver Jordan Norwood, who caught six passes for 110 yards—but freshman kicker Kevin Kelly missed a 29-yard field goal with seconds left in the game, sending the game to overtime. The box score at the end of regulation demonstrated each team's sound defensive play and poor discipline; Penn State had gained just 20 first downs (doubling Florida State's 10), the teams had combined to punt 20 times, and the teams had been flagged for 21 penalties (losing 172 yards). Though Penn State held a 100-yard advantage in total offense and had an eight-minute edge in time-of-possession—without suspended linebacker A.J. Nicholson, the Seminoles struggled to stop the run—Florida State kept the game close by forcing two Nittany Lions turnovers in Seminoles territory. In the first overtime, Cismesia missed another kick for the Seminoles, this a 48-yard field goal, but Kelly failed to connect on a 38-yard attempt that would have given his team the win. Penn State took the ball to begin the second overtime and after Robinson hit Kilmer for 17 yards to take the Nittany Lions inside the two-yard line, Scott scored his second touchdown of the game and Kelly made the extra point to put Penn State up seven points; Florida State responded almost immediately, though, as Weatherford threw to Reid for 11 yards and to Greg Carr for 12 before fullback B.J. Dean made his only carry of the day count, scoring from one yard out—Cismesia's extra point tied the game at 23. After their defense held Florida State to four yards in the third overtime and after Cismesia missed his third kick of the game, a 38-yard field goal attempt that hit the right upright, Robinson found freshman wide receiver Justin King for one of King's five catches on the day and then ran for a first down, setting up a 29-yard field goal try by Kelly, who, in making the kick, redeemed himself after twice missing field goal tries that would have given his team the win, ending a game that lasted until 12:59 AM US EST, prompting Paterno to query an Orange Bowl official at the trophy ceremony, "How long were we here, three months?" The win evened Paterno's record against Bowden; the two had tied once and Bowden's Seminoles defeated Paterno's Nittany Lions in the inaugural Blockbuster Bowl in 1990, which was played in then-Joe Robbie Stadium. Penn State won without the services of Dick Butkus Award winner Paul Posluszny, who was injured early in the second half and did not return; after having been taken for x-rays, however, Posluszny returned to the sidelines to motivate his team. The Nittany Lions finished third in the final writers (AP) and coaches' (USA Today) polls.

=== Rose Bowl Game ===
- Texas (12–0) 41, Southern California (12–0) 38

The Rose Bowl Game, serving as the final game and national championship of the BCS series, was played on January 4, 2006, at the eponymous stadium in Pasadena, California, matching the two remaining unbeaten Division I-A squads, Big 12 champion Texas and defending national champion and Pac-10 titleholder Southern California, and saw a back-and-forth contest ultimately won by the Longhorns, 41–38. Southern California entered the game with a 34-game winning streak, the longest active streak in Division I-A, as they also were going for a third consecutive AP national championship.; Texas brought the second-longest active streak, having won 19 straight games, and also entered as Rose Bowl defending champion, having defeated Michigan in 2005. The game also featured 2004 Heisman Trophy-winning Trojans quarterback Matt Leinart and 2005 Heisman Trophy-winning Trojans running back Reggie Bush, as well as Longhorns quarterback Vince Young, who had finished second to Bush just weeks before the game, and was the first to have matched teams ranked first and second in every iteration of the BCS standings. The game often referred to as The Granddaddy of Them All took on extra significance, then, and in the weeks preceding the contest was widely referred to by analysts as "the greatest championship game ever", given both the talent of each team and the expected competitiveness of the game.

== Non-All-Star Game Bowl Summary ==
=== Conference standings ===
The list of conferences infra includes all conferences with at least one team having played in a bowl game, and is sorted first by winning percentage, then by total games won, and finally alphabetically, by conference name.

The conferences with the highest winning percentage received the Bowl Challenge Cup, sponsored by ESPN and Cooper Tires. Conferences must have had a minimum of three bowl teams to be eligible. With Texas' win in the Rose Bowl Game, the Big 12 and the ACC shared the title for 2005–06, in the first instance of a shared title in the promotion's brief history. Had Southern California defeated Texas, the Pac-10 would have finished with a 4–1 record and been the sole winner of the trophy.

Final Standings

Conference	Number of Teams	Wins-Losses	Winning Percentage	Teams
ACC	8	5–3	.625	Winners: Boston College, Clemson, North Carolina State, Virginia, Virginia Tech; Losers: Florida State, Georgia Tech, Miami (Florida)
Big 12	8	5–3	.625	Winners: Kansas, Missouri, Nebraska, Oklahoma, Texas; Losers: Colorado, Iowa State, Texas Tech
Pac-10	5	3–2	.600	Winners: Arizona State, California, UCLA; Losers: Oregon, Southern California
SEC	6	3–3	.500	Winners: Alabama, Florida, LSU; Losers: Auburn, Georgia, South Carolina
C-USA	6	3–3	.500	Winners: Southern Mississippi, Memphis, Tulsa; Losers: Central Florida, Houston, UTEP
MWC	4	2–2	.500	Winners: TCU, Utah; Losers: BYU, Colorado State
MAC §	2	1–1	.500	Winner: Toledo; Loser: Akron
Independent	2	1–1	.500	Winner: Navy; Loser: Notre Dame
Big Ten	7	3–4	.428	Winners: Ohio State, Penn State, Wisconsin; Losers: Iowa, Michigan, Minnesota, Northwestern
WAC	3	1–2	.333	Winner: Nevada; Losers: Boise State, Fresno State
Big East	4	1–3	.250	Winners: West Virginia; Losers: Louisville, Rutgers, South Florida
Sun Belt §	1	0–1	.000	Winner: None; Loser: Arkansas State

§ — Did not field enough teams for inclusion in the Bowl Challenge Cup.

=== All-Bowl Teams ===
Both CBSSportsline.com and ESPN.com compiled an all-bowl team after the completion of bowl season, determining the top bowl performances by position. The chart infra gives the lists by position, with each player's school in parentheses; where ESPN.com has chosen the same player as CBSSportsline.com, only the last name is given in the second entry.

Position	CBSSportsline.com Selection(s)	ESPN.com Selection(s)
Quarterback	Vince Young (Texas)	Young
Running back	Steve Slaton (West Virginia), DeAngelo Williams (Memphis), Reggie Campbell (Navy)	Slaton, Williams
Wide receiver	Brandon Marshall (Central Florida), Travis LaTendresse (Utah)	LaTendresse; Ted Ginn, Junior (Ohio State)
Tight end	Tom Santi (Virginia)	David Thomas (Texas)
Offensive lineman	Travis Garrett, Ryan Stanchek, Dan Mozes, Jeremy Sheffey, Garin Justice (all West Virginia)	Chris Messner (Oklahoma), Antron Harper (Navy), Antoine Caldwell (Alabama), Will Arnold (Louisiana State), Andrew Carnahan (Arizona State)
Defensive lineman	Mario Williams (North Carolina State), Jason Berryman (Iowa State), Charlton Keith (Kansas), Wallace Gilberry (Alabama), Jeremy Clark (Alabama), Mark Anderson (Alabama)	Keith, Jay Alford (Penn State), Brodrick Bunkley (Florida State), Melvin Oliver (LSU)
Linebacker	A. J. Hawk (Ohio State), Stephen Tulloch (North Carolina State), Abdul Hodge (Iowa)	Hawk, Tulloch, Nelson Coleman (Tulsa)
Defensive back	Ryan Glasper (Boston College), Brandon Flowers (Virginia Tech), Dwayne Slay (Texas Tech), Anthony Trucks (Oregon)	Vernell Brown (Florida), Marcus King (Missouri), Jarrad Page (UCLA), Titus Brothers (Nebraska)
Placekicker	Jeremy Ito (Rutgers)	Jamie Christensen (Alabama)
Punter	Chris Hall (Florida State)	Phil Brady (West Virginia)
Kick or Punt Returner	Brandon Breazell (UCLA), Willie Reid (Florida State)	Reid

=== Top Individual Bowl Performances ===
The charts infra provide the top ten individual performances in each of three offensive categories from amongst all bowl game performances. Each chart is ordered by yards gained and each player's team is given in parentheses.

Rushing (all players played primarily at running back unless otherwise noted)

Player	Carries	Yards Gained	Touchdowns
DeAngelo Williams (Memphis)	31	238	3
Brian Calhoun (Wisconsin)	30	213	1
Steve Slaton (West Virginia)	26	204	3
Kevin Smith (Central Florida)	29	202	3
Vince Young (Texas) (quarterback)	20	200	3
Marshawn Lynch (California-Berkeley)	24	194	3
B.J. Mitchell (Nevada)	23	178	2
Cody Hill (Southern Mississippi)	37	164	1
Cory Ross (Nebraska)	28	161	1
Brad Smith (Missouri) (quarterback)	21	150	3

Passing

Player	Completions	Attempts	Yards Gained	Touchdowns	Interceptions
Rudy Carpenter (Arizona State)	23	35	467	4	0
Luke Getsy (Akron)	34	59	455	4	0
Brett Basanez (Northwestern)	39	70	416	2	2
Brett Ratliff (Utah)	30	41	381	4	0
Justin Holland (Colorado State)	26	33	381	3	0
Ryan Hart (Rutgers)	24	38	374	3	0
Matt Leinart (Southern California)	31	41	365	1	1
Marques Hagans (Virginia)	23	32	358	2	1
John Beck (Brigham Young)	35	53	352	2	2
Troy Smith (Ohio State)	19	28	342	2	0

Receiving (all players played primarily at wide receiver)

Player	Receptions	Yards Gained	Touchdowns
Travis LaTendresse (Utah)	16	214	4
Brandon Marshall (Central Florida)	11	211	3
Sidney Rice (South Carolina)	12	191	1
Jabari Arthur (Akron)	8	180	2
Brandon Williams (Wisconsin)	6	173	1
Ted Ginn, Junior (Ohio State)	8	167	1
Dallas Baker (Florida)	10	147	2
Will Blackmon (Boston College)	5	144	1
Keith Brown (Alabama)	5	142	1
Ross Lane (Northwestern)	7	135	0

=== Top Team Bowl Performances ===
The charts provide the top five (and ties) team performances in each of two offensive and defensive categories. Total offense and defense charts are ordered by yards gained and surrendered, respectively; scoring offense and defense charts are ordered by points scored and surrendered, respectively. "Scoring offense" and "scoring defense" points totals include points all points scored by a team, not solely those scored by the respective units.

Total Offense (each performance was in a winning effort, unless otherwise noted)

Team	Yards Gained	Bowl Game
Arizona State	687	Insight Bowl
Nevada	617	Hawaii Bowl (overtime)
Navy	614	Poinsettia Bowl
Ohio State	580	Fiesta Bowl
Northwestern (Lost)	579	Sun Bowl

Total Defense (each performance was in a winning effort)

Team	Yards Allowed	Bowl Game
Clemson	122	Champs Sports Bowl
LSU	143	Peach Bowl
Wisconsin	238	Capital One Bowl
Kansas	247	Fort Worth Bowl
Toledo	251	GMAC Bowl

Scoring Offense (each performance was in a winning performance, unless otherwise noted)

Team	Points Scored	Bowl Game
Navy	51	Poinsettia Bowl
UCLA	50	Sun Bowl
Nevada	49	Hawaii Bowl (overtime)
Central Florida	48	Hawaii Bowl (overtime) (losing performance)
Toledo	45	GMAC Bowl
Arizona State	45	Insight Bowl

Scoring Defense (each performance was in a winning performance)

Team	Points Allowed	Bowl Game
North Carolina State	0	Meineke Car Care Bowl
LSU	3	Peach Bowl
Clemson	10	Champs Sports Bowl
Utah	10	Emerald Bowl
Alabama	10	Cotton Bowl Classic

== All-Star Games ==
The demise of the Blue–Gray Football Classic two years ago and the cancellation of the Gridiron Classic due to lack of sponsorship this year gave rise to one new game this year (the Magnolia Gridiron All-Star Classic), bringing to five the number of post-season all-star games, each of which is now designed primarily to showcase draft-eligible players for NFL scouts, coaches, and general managers in order that players might be drafted into the professional ranks; each game, to that end, offers its own assortment of scouting sessions, open workouts, and individual practices to provide more opportunities during which NFL personnel might evaluate players. The games do serve ancillary purposes as well, though, as, for example, the Shrine game operates as a charitable fundraiser and the Hula Bowl sometimes provides the opportunity for Japanese players from the Kansai Football Association to test their mettle against NCAA stars.

=== Magnolia Gridiron All-Star Classic ===
- White 17, Red 9

The inaugural Magnolia Gridiron All-Star Classic was played at Mississippi Veterans Memorial Stadium in Jackson, Mississippi on December 24, 2005. The White team, composed of Division I-A seniors from teams either having already played in a bowl game or not having been selected for or qualified for a bowl game and coached by Kentucky offensive coordinator Joker Phillips, defeated the Red team, an all-star team of Division I-AA, Division II, and Division III schools coached by Northwestern State head coach Scott Stoker, 17–9. Each team punted to open the game, and with 3:24 remaining in the first quarter, Eastern Michigan quarterback Matt Bohnet, who completed each of the three passes he attempted on the day, connected with Louisiana–Lafayette wide receiver Bill Sampy for a 41-yard touchdown, which, in a game of inconsistent offenses that saw the teams combine for just 18 first downs while allowing five sacks, six pass deflections, and three turnovers, stood as the only score of the game until behind Southern Miss quarterback Dustin Almond, off a two-touchdown performance in the New Orleans Bowl at Lafayette, the team drove to the Red 5-yard line before settling for a field goal to give White a 10-point lead with 2:05 to play in the first half. Behind Indiana State quarterback Blayne Baggett, Red engineered a drive of its own, ultimately scoring on a one-yard touchdown scamper by Baggett as time in the first half expired. Led by Louisiana–Monroe quarterback Steven Jyles, who finished the game having passed for 80 yards and having rushed for 31 more, White scored just 2:39 into the second half, as Jyles threw seven yards to Texas A&M tight end Boone Stutz from seven yards, giving his team a 17–7 lead. An end-zone sack of Jyles by Appalachian State defensive end Justin Hunter scored a safety for Red, but, even as Alabama State running back Keldrick Williams ran for 67 yards on just eight carries for Red, neither team could manage a score over the game's last 21:18 as White hung on to win by eight.

=== Las Vegas All-American Classic ===
- East 41, West 3

The Las Vegas All-American Classic at the University of Nevada, Las Vegas's Sam Boyd Stadium in Whitney, Nevada, was played on January 14, 2006, as a team of Division I-A and I-AA and NAIA all-stars from schools located east of the Mississippi River defeated a similarly constituted team from schools located west of the Mississippi for the first time in three years, 41–3. Miami (Florida) fullback Quadtrine Hill scored two of the East's first three touchdowns (on which two extra points were missed), one a rush and one a reception from Central Michigan quarterback Kent Smith, as the East took a 19–3 lead midway through the second quarter; between Hill's scores was a touchdown reception by Carroll College wide receiver Tyler Emmert, on a pass thrown by Murray State quarterback Daniel Rumley. An inconsistent offensive performance by the West and a taut defensive showing by the East held the West scoreless for the remainder of the game; the West team ultimately gained only 102 yards for the game. Tulane safety Tra Boger extended the East lead to 23 points in the third quarter, as he returned an interception thrown by Brett Elliott, a backup quarterback at Utah, 40 yards for a touchdown. Florida State running back James Coleman scored for the East in the third quarter, and, after successfully converting a two-point attempt, the East team took a 34–3 lead into the fourth quarter. Drives by each team stalled repeatedly in the second half, and the East's final touchdown came again on defense, as Boger returned a fumble 24 yards for a touchdown. Overall, each offense was inconsistent, and the teams combined for just 391 yards, only 157 of that on the ground. In total, 14 players whose teams appeared in bowl games participated for the East (four were supplied by Miami [Florida], from which the most East players came); the number was 16 for the West team, for whom the principal supplier was Iowa State (three players).

=== East–West Shrine Game ===
- West 35, East 31

The East–West Shrine Game at the Alamodome in San Antonio, Texas, the titular sponsor's home city, was the first of two all-star games contested on January 21, 2006, and saw the West team, made up of players from Division I-A and I-AA colleges and universities west of the Mississippi River, stage a fourth-quarter comeback to defeat the East team, composed of players from schools east of the Mississippi, 35–31. This was the first Shrine Game played in San Antonio—the previous eighty editions had been held in stadia in the San Francisco Bay Area, except for the 1942 game, which was played in New Orleans. The East scored just 2:12 into the game, as Arkansas running back De'Arrius Howard, who would lead all rushers in the game in accumulating 61 yards on 15 carries, scored on seven-yard run; the body of the drive was a 66-yard reception by Auburn tight end Cooper Wallace, who, with just one catch, would nevertheless finish the game as the East's second leading-receiver. Each team punted after a stalled drive before the West, behind Texas A&M quarterback Reggie McNeal, drove 78 yards, ultimately scoring on a one-yard touchdown pass from McNeal to Oregon tight end Tim Day. McNeal, playing just four series in the game, would finish as the West's leading passer and runner, having accumulated the bulk of his 32 rushing yards during the West's first scoring drive. The West would score twice in a span of four-and-one-half minutes in the early stages of the second quarter, as Texas Tech running back Taurean Henderson, who ran for 32 yards on seven carries over the game, ran for a two-yard touchdown and Texas tight end David Thomas caught a 20-yard scoring toss from UCLA quarterback Drew Olson, who completed five of eight passes for 67 yards for the game; two more successful extra points by Missouri State kicker Jonathan Scifres would give the West a 21–7 lead. The East team answered immediately, as Toledo quarterback Bruce Gradkowski, who was his team's leading passer, having at game's end completed 8 of 16 passes for 109 yards, led a four-minute drive that was capped by his 10-yard touchdown throw to Hofstra tight end Marques Colston; neither team managed to score again before halftime and the West team took a 21–14 lead into the locker room. Receiving the kickoff to open the third quarter, the East team scored quickly, as Howard found the end zone for his second rushing touchdown of the day, this from three yards, with just 2:11 having elapsed in the second half; East was quarterbacked on the drive by Northwestern's Brett Basanez, who completed just six of 13 passes for 89 yards on the day. After the teams exchanged punts, the East finally retook the lead with 2:18 to play in the third quarter on a 47-yard field goal by Ohio State kicker Josh Huston, who would score seven points on the day. With Fresno State quarterback Paul Pinegar under center, the West was able to muster little offensively in the early fourth quarter, and Pinegar finished the day having completed just 3 of 9 passes for 50 yards and having thrown one interception. With 8:13 remaining in the game, Howard scored his third touchdown of the day, this from 11 yards, on a drive keyed by the running of Florida State running back Leon Washington, who, in the game, carried nine times for 44 yards and caught six passes for 26 yards, and the Huston extra point gave the East a ten-point lead. McNeal reentered the game for the West and sparked a comeback, hitting fellow Aggie wide receiver Jason Carter for 66 of Carter's 85 receiving yards before handing off to New Mexico running back DonTrell Moore, who scored on a 10-yard rush to cut the East lead to 31–28 with just under seven minutes to play in the game. The ensuing East drive stalled, and McNeal engineered another scoring drive, connecting first with Brigham Young receiver Todd Watkins for 46 yards for Watkins' only catch of the day, and then hitting Oregon State wide receiver Mike Hass for a 23-yard touchdown with 2:00 to play in the game, giving the West a 35–31 lead; Hass was the game's leading receiver, catching four passes for 107 yards. Alabama State quarterback Tarvaris Jackson led the East on the ensuing drive, notably hitting Western Michigan wide receiver Greg Jennings for a key first down, and, with one second left, connected with Colston, who caught five passes for 82 yards for the game, for a gain to the West one-yard line; the final play of the game was a handoff to Howard, but this time the West defense held and Howard was stopped short of the goal line as the West preserved the win. Though the West committed two turnovers (Pinegar's interception and a fumble) and the East none, the East also committed errors, being flagged for 11 penalties totaling 110 yards by the National Football League referees who officiated the game. McNeal's Texas A&M head coach, Dennis Franchione, led the West team in victory, while Arkansas' Houston Nutt coached the East team. Each team, in keeping with Shrine Game tradition, fielded one player from a Canadian college or university; for the East, Western Ontario wide receiver Andy Fantuz caught one pass for 11 yards, while, for the West, Calgary defensive tackle Daniel Federkiel registered a tackle. Organizers expressed disappointment in the game's crowd; the move to Texas had been made, in part, because attendance was declining in San Francisco, but the game drew but 18,533 fans, the fewest for any Shrine Game in 79 years.

=== Hula Bowl ===
- East 10, West 7

The Hula Bowl at Aloha Stadium in Honolulu, Hawai'i, was the second all-star game played on January 21, 2006; in the first Hula Bowl played in Honolulu in eight years—the game was played on Maui from 1998 to 2005—the East squad, composed of all-stars from schools east of the Mississippi, overcame two late turnovers to defeat the West squad, featuring players from schools west of the Mississippi, 10–7; each team, though primarily consisting of Division I-A players, also included players from schools in Divisions I-AA, II, and III. Each team scored in the first 7:15 of the first quarter before each team tightened defensively to allow only one combined score over the rest of the game. Missouri quarterback Brad Smith started the scoring with a 15-yard touchdown run just over three-and-one-half minutes into the game; the East defense largely contained Smith on the West's first three drives, though, as he ran seven other times for minus-19 yards and completed only 4 of 12 passes for 58 yards, twice finding the top West wide receiver, Air Force's Jason Brown for a total of 40 yards. Behind Miami (Ohio) quarterback Josh Betts, who led all quarterbacks in the game in completing 7 of 15 passes for 106 yards, the East team drove to the West 19-yard line on the ensuing drive before the offense stalled and settled for a 36-yard field goal by Notre Dame kicker D.J. Fitzpatrick. Working at quarterback for the West, Texas State's Barrick Nealy, who would complete only one of nine pass attempts in the game, that for minus-nine yards, threw an interception caught by Iowa State free safety Steve Paris, and, working on a short field, the East took the lead for good early in the second quarter when Linfield quarterback Brett Elliott, who would finish the day having completed four of eight passes for 53 yards, connected with Central Florida receiver Brandon Marshall on a 10-yard scoring pass; Marshall, who would finish as the game's leading receiver, catching five passes for 101 yards, was voted game most valuable player by the assembled media, notching his second MVP award in Hawai'i during the bowl season, having previously been voted co-MVP in Central Florida's Sheraton Hawai'i Bowl loss. The Fitzpatrick extra point gave the East a three-point lead, and the cushion would stand as each team struggled offensively during the remainder of the game; the West would lose a fumble for its second turnover of the day, and the East would give away possession three times, with Elliot's and Betts' each throwing an interception. Each team did have some success on the ground early in the second half, as Georgia Tech's P.J. Daniels and Bowling Green's P.J. Pope carried 18 times in the game for a combined 77 yards, and as a triumvirate of North Texas' Patrick Cobbs, Utah's Quinton Ganther, and Nealy rushed for 76 yards over 20 carries; nonetheless, each defense also forced several negative rushing plays, and for the day the East averaged only 3.5 yards per carry, bettering West's 2.3 average. Passing production was no better, and, on the day, the five quarterbacks combined to complete just 16 of 45 passes for zero touchdowns and three interceptions; the teams further combined for just 27 total first downs and 406 yards. The West, though, had two opportunities late in the game to tie the score or take the lead, as Iowa cornerback Jovon Johnson returned an interception to the 21-yard line and as Missouri cornerback Marcus King intercepted a pass near midfield; the East sacked Smith for a 15-yard loss on third down after the Johnson interception, taking the West out of field goal range, and, after the King interception, forced a Smith fumble to seal the game. Though Marshall was selected as game MVP by the media, each coaching staff also gave an award; for the West, head coach Tyrone Willingham, representing Washington, and assistants Dick Tomey (San Jose State), Chuck Martin (Grand Valley State), and Bob Berezowitz (Wisconsin-Whitewater), selected Smith, who scored the only touchdown of the game for the West, while, for the East, head coach Tommy Tuberville (Auburn) and assistants Skip Holtz (East Carolina), Scot Dapp (Moravian), and Jerry Moore (Appalachian State) selected Illinois State defensive end Brent Hawkins, who recorded a sack and forced fumble and several quarterback pressures.

=== Senior Bowl ===
- North 31, South 14

The Senior Bowl, whose presenting sponsor was a local grocery chain, concluded the college football season at Ladd–Peebles Stadium in Mobile, Alabama, on January 28, 2006. The game, played in a North-versus-South format reminiscent of the defunct Blue-Gray Classic and governed by NFL rules and officials in order best to approximate how prospective professionals would play in NFL situations, saw the South team lose an early lead and, following three turnovers, ultimately fall, 31–14. The North team drove the length of the field on its first possession, but Vanderbilt quarterback Jay Cutler, who completed just 6 of 19 passes on the day for only 69 yards, threw an interception to Texas cornerback Cedric Griffin. The South capitalized on the turnover, and just 8:24 into the game, Alabama quarterback Brodie Croyle, who was his team's leading passer, completing 6 of 11 passes for 77 yards, found Miami (Florida) wide receiver Sinorice Moss for a 30-yard touchdown; Moss would finish the day as the South's leading receiver, having caught three passes for 45 yards, and as the team's second-leading rusher, carrying just once but for 27 yards. Moss, for his efforts, which also included a fumble recovery, was named the game's overall most valuable player. The North answered just four-and-a-half minutes later, as Clemson quarterback Charlie Whitehurst, who would be named his team's offensive MVP after finishing the day having completed 7 of 9 passes for 90 yards, connected with Colorado tight end Joe Klopfenstein from 15 yards for a touchdown; Klopfenstein's three catches and 39 receiving yards on the day would place him second among all North receivers. The teams exchanged possessions and, early in the second quarter, the South defense forced a punt from the North; the ball was bobbled, though, and Nebraska safety Daniel Bullocks fell on the ball in the end zone for a touchdown, putting his team up 14–7; Bullocks later recovered another muffed punt. Powered by the rushing of Washington State running back Jerome Harrison, who gained 51 yards on 11 carries for the game, the North team drove to the South 11-yard line with just under four minutes remaining in the first half before the South defense tightened and forced a field goal try; Wyoming kicker Deric Yaussi was successful from 28 yards, giving his North team a 17–7 halftime lead. The North team controlled the ball for much of the third quarter, contributing to their 12:34 advantage in time-of-possession over the game, and several running backs accumulated key yards for the squad. Oregon's Terrence Whitehead (six carries for 32 yards), Arizona's Mike Bell (five for 20), Colorado's Lawrence Vickers (four for 19), and Virginia Tech's Cedric Humes (five for 19) helped the North team total 200 yards rushing on the day, and with 4:49 remaining in the quarter, Humes scored on a one-yard rush to put the North up 17 points. Directing the North in the third quarter was Penn State dual-threat quarterback Michael Robinson, who completed only one pass in the game but ran nine times for 63 yards, outgaining each of the North's running backs. The North defense continued to stymie the South offense for much of the second half, holding Georgia quarterback D.J. Shockley and Alabama-Birmingham quarterback Darrell Hackney to a combined 5-for-13 passing for just 55 yards, sacking the two twice, and forcing a Shockley interception. Nevertheless, thanks to the play of Memphis running back DeAngelo Williams, who was named the South's offensive MVP, carrying thrice for 31 yards and catching two passes for 28 more, the South assembled a successful drive late in the third quarter, and, just 44 seconds into the fourth quarter, Hackney completed a 17-yard scoring pass to Auburn wide receiver Devin Aromashodu, cutting the South's deficit to 10. Another successful defensive stand by the South was negated when Bullocks recovered his second muffed punt of the day, setting up Cutler's seven-yard touchdown toss to Arizona State wide receiver Derek Hagan, who caught three passes for 25 yards on the day; Yaussi's successful extra point attempt—the seventh point he would score on the day—returned the North advantage to 17, where it would stay. The South's offensive efforts were hampered by the team's inability to rush the ball consistently; Mississippi State running back Jerrious Norwood, Louisiana State running back Joseph Addai, and South Florida running back Andre Hall gained just 11 yards over their seven carries. Providing receiving help for the South were California-Los Angeles tight end Dominique Byrd, who led all receivers with four catches for 67 yards, and Michigan wide receiver Jason Avant, who added two catches for 23 yards; for the North, Auburn wide receiver Ben Obomanu, North Carolina State tight end T.J. Williams, and New Mexico wide receiver Hank Bassett each added a reception and at least 13 yards. For his role in holding the South to 179 total yards, Penn State defensive end Tamba Hali, who recorded two sacks, was named the defensive MVP for the North; for the South, the defensive MVP was Georgia Tech linebacker Gerris Wilkinson, who recorded a sack and four tackles. The victorious North squad was coached by the staff of the Tennessee Titans, led by Jeff Fisher, while the South team was coached by the San Francisco 49ers' staff, headed by Mike Nolan.
