= Dixie Gridiron Classic =

College football all-star game

Dixie Gridiron Classic (defunct)
- Stadium: Hansen Stadium
- Location: St. George, Utah
- Operated: 2011

2011 matchup
- Pacific vs. Mountain (Mountain 17-13)

The Dixie Gridiron Classic was a postseason college football all-star game that was played on February 5, 2011, as one of the concluding games of the 2010 college football post-season. The game was played at Hansen Stadium in St. George, Utah on the campus of Dixie State College.

The Dixie Gridiron Classic featured approximately 90 NCAA Division I FBS and FCS standouts from the Pac-12, Big 12, Mountain West, WAC, Conference USA, Big Sky and Pioneer Conferences in the showcase event, which pitted the Pacific States All-Stars against the Mountain States All-Stars. Head coaches of the Pacific and Mountain squads included former NFL Players and College Coaches.

Due to the delay of waiting on bowl match ups, and with players and coaches away from schools for the holiday break, the date of the game was moved to February 5, 2011, from January 1, 2011, as was originally intended.

Coached by Ron McBride, the Mountain All-Stars won the Dixie Gridiron Classic 17–13, defeating the Pacific All-Stars, who were coached by Roy Shivers.

The game MVP was Mistral Raymond, a safety from South Florida.

== See also ==
- List of college bowl games
