= Boise State Broncos football statistical leaders =

The Boise State Broncos football statistical leaders are individual statistical leaders of the Boise State Broncos football program in various categories, including passing, rushing, receiving, total offense, all-purpose yardage, defensive stats, kicking, and scoring. Within those areas, the lists identify single-game, single-season, and career leaders. As of the current 2026 season, the Broncos represent Boise State University in the NCAA Division I FBS Pac-12 Conference.

Although Boise State began competing in intercollegiate football as a 2-year college in 1933, the school's official record book only includes 1968 and later, when Boise State became a 4-year college.

These lists are dominated by more recent players for several reasons:

- Since 1968, seasons have increased from 10 games to 11 and then 12 games in length.
  - From 2001, when Boise State joined the Western Athletic Conference (WAC; now known as the United Athletic Conference), to the school's final season in the Mountain West Conference (MW) in 2025, the Broncos were in the same football conference as Hawaii, with the sole exception of the 2011 season (Boise State's first MW season, with Hawaii still in WAC football). This is relevant because NCAA rules allow a team that plays at Hawaii to schedule an extra regular-season game. However, when Hawaii joined MW football in 2012, the two schools were placed in separate football divisions, which meant that the Broncos would only visit Hawaii once every four years. Additionally, while Boise State has been eligible to schedule an extra game twice since the teams were reunited in the MW (in 2012 and 2016), it did not do so in either season.
- Bowl games only began counting toward single-season and career statistics in 2002. The Broncos have qualified for bowl games in every season since then, giving players an extra game to accumulate statistics in all seasons except 2018, when their bowl game was suspended during the first quarter due to severe weather and ultimately canceled without play resuming; 2020, when the Broncos opted out of playing a bowl game amid the COVID-19 pandemic; and 2021, when COVID-19 issues within the program forced the Broncos to pull out of their scheduled bowl game.
- During their MW tenure, the Broncos played in the MW Championship Game eight times since that game was established in 2013 (specifically in 2014, 2017–2020, and 2023–2025), giving players in those seasons yet another game to accumulate statistics.
- Due to COVID-19 disruptions, the NCAA did not count the 2020 season against the eligibility of any football player, giving all players active in that season five years of eligibility instead of the normal four.
- From 2018 through 2025, players were allowed to participate in as many as four games in a redshirt season; previously, playing in even one game "burned" the redshirt. In 2024 and 2025, postseason games did not count against the four-game limit. These changes to redshirt rules have given very recent players several extra games to accumulate statistics.
- A more recent change likely to significantly affect future career leaderboards was introduced in 2026 with full implementation starting with the 2027 freshman class. Going forward, redshirting will be prohibited, but players will have five years of full athletic eligibility, provided that they are no older than 19 when they first enroll in a postsecondary institution. Players who had remaining eligibility under previous rules at the end of the 2025 season will benefit from the new rule.

These lists are updated through Week 12 of the 2026 season. Players active for Boise State in 2026 are in bold.

== Passing ==
=== Passing yards ===
Career
Rank	Player	Yards	Years
1	Kellen Moore	14,667	2008 2009 2010 2011
2	Brett Rypien	13,578	2015 2016 2017 2018
3	Ryan Dinwiddie	9,819	2000 2001 2002 2003
4	Tony Hilde	9,107	1993 1994 1995 1996
5	Bart Hendricks	9,020	1997 1998 1999 2000
6	**Maddux Madsen**	8,949	2022 2023 2024 2025 2026
7	Jared Zabransky	8,256	2003 2004 2005 2006
8	Hank Bachmeier	6,605	2019 2020 2021 2022
9	Grant Hedrick	5,656	2011 2012 2013 2014
10	Jim McMillan	5,508	1971 1972 1973 1974

Single season
Rank	Player	Yards	Year
1	Ryan Dinwiddie	4,356	2003
2	Kellen Moore	3,845	2010
3	Kellen Moore	3,800	2011
4	Brett Rypien	3,705	2018
5	Grant Hedrick	3,696	2014
6	Brett Rypien	3,646	2016
7	Kellen Moore	3,536	2009
8	Kellen Moore	3,486	2008
9	Bart Hendricks	3,364	2000
10	Brett Rypien	3,353	2015

Single game
Rank	Player	Yards	Year	Opponent
1	Ryan Dinwiddie	532	2003	Louisiana Tech
2	Ryan Dinwiddie	509	2003	SMU
3	Kellen Moore	507	2010	Hawaii
4	Brett Rypien	506	2015	New Mexico
5	Brett Rypien	469	2015	UNLV
6	Kellen Moore	455	2011	Toledo
7	Jim McMillan	454	1974	UNLV
8	Brett Rypien	442	2016	BYU
9	Kellen Moore	414	2008	Nevada
10	Grant Hedrick	410	2014	BYU

=== Passing touchdowns ===
Career
Rank	Player	TDs	Years
1	Kellen Moore	142	2008 2009 2010 2011
2	Brett Rypien	89	2015 2016 2017 2018
3	Ryan Dinwiddie	82	2000 2001 2002 2003
4	Bart Hendricks	78	1997 1998 1999 2000
5	Tony Hilde	70	1993 1994 1995 1996
	**Maddux Madsen**	70	2022 2023 2024 2025 2026
7	Jim McMillan	58	1971 1972 1973 1974
7	Jared Zabransky	58	2003 2004 2005 2006
9	Hank Bachmeier	41	2019 2020 2021 2022
10	Grant Hedrick	39	2011 2012 2013 2014

Single season
Rank	Player	TDs	Year
1	Kellen Moore	43	2011
2	Kellen Moore	39	2009
3	Bart Hendricks	35	2000
3	Kellen Moore	35	2010
5	Jim McMillan	33	1974
6	Ryan Dinwiddie	31	2003
7	Taylor Tharp	30	2007
8	Ryan Dinwiddie	29	2001
8	Brett Rypien	29	2018
10	Tony Hilde	26	1994

Single game
Rank	Player	TDs	Year	Opponent
1	Jim McMillan	6	1974	Montana
2	18 times by 13 players	5	Most recent: Brett Rypien, 2016 vs. New Mexico	

== Rushing ==
=== Rushing yards ===
Career
Rank	Player	Yards	Years
1	Ashton Jeanty	4,769	2022 2023 2024
2	Cedric Minter	4,475	1977 1978 1979 1980
3	Ian Johnson	4,183	2005 2006 2007 2008
4	Brock Forsey	4,045	1999 2000 2001 2002
5	Jay Ajayi	3,796	2012 2013 2014
6	George Holani	3,596	2019 2020 2021 2022 2023
7	Chris Thomas	3,437	1988 1989 1990 1991
8	Doug Martin	3,431	2008 2009 2010 2011
9	Jeremy McNichols	3,209	2014 2015 2016
10	Rodney Webster	3,034	1980 1981 1982 1983

Single season
Rank	Player	Yards	Year
1	Ashton Jeanty	2,601	2024
2	Jay Ajayi	1,823	2014
3	Ian Johnson	1,713	2006
4	Jeremy McNichols	1,709	2016
5	Brock Forsey	1,611	2002
6	Cedric Minter	1,526	1978
7	Jay Ajayi	1,425	2013
8	**Dylan Riley**	1,360	2026
9	Ashton Jeanty	1,347	2023
10	Jeremy McNichols	1,337	2015

Single game
Rank	Player	Yards	Year	Opponent
1	Ashton Jeanty	267	2024	Georgia Southern
2	Cedric Minter	261	1978	Northern Michigan
3	Ashton Jeanty	259	2024	Washington State
4	Eron Hurley	254	1998	Idaho
5	Alexander Mattison	242	2017	Colorado State
6	Ian Johnson	240	2006	Oregon State
7	David Mikell	235	2003	Idaho
8	Jay Ajayi	229	2014	Utah State
9	Ashton Jeanty	226	2024	Oregon State
10	Jay Ajayi	222	2013	Nevada

=== Rushing touchdowns ===
Career
Rank	Player	TDs	Years
1	Ian Johnson	58	2005 2006 2007 2008
2	Brock Forsey	50	1999 2000 2001 2002 2003
2	Jay Ajayi	50	2012 2013 2014
2	Ashton Jeanty	50	2022 2023 2024
5	Jeremy McNichols	44	2014 2015 2016
6	Doug Martin	43	2008 2009 2010 2011
7	D.J. Harper	39	2007 2008 2009 2010 2011 2012
8	Cedric Minter	37	1977 1978 1979 1980
9	David Mikell	32	2000 2001 2002 2003
9	Chris Thomas	32	1988 1989 1990 1991
9	Alexander Mattison	32	2016 2017 2018

Single season
Rank	Player	TDs	Year
1	Ashton Jeanty	29	2024
2	Jay Ajayi	28	2014
3	Brock Forsey	26	2002
4	Ian Johnson	25	2006
5	Jeremy McNichols	23	2016
6	Jay Ajayi	18	2013
6	Jeremy McNichols	18	2015
8	Chris Jackson	16	1987
8	Ian Johnson	16	2007
8	Doug Martin	16	2011
8	Alexander Mattison	16	2018

Single game
Rank	Player	TDs	Year	Opponent
1	Ashton Jeanty	6	2024	Georgia Southern
2	Jon Helmandollar	5	2004	Louisiana Tech
2	Ian Johnson	5	2006	Oregon State
2	Jay Ajayi	5	2014	Utah State
5	16 times by 11 players	4	Most recent: **Dylan Riley**, 2025 vs. Air Force	

== Receiving ==
=== Receptions ===
Career
Rank	Player	Rec	Years
1	Matt Miller	244	2011 2012 2013 2014
2	Shane Williams-Rhodes	233	2012 2013 2014 2015
3	Austin Pettis	229	2007 2008 2009 2010
4	Thomas Sperbeck	224	2013 2014 2015 2015
5	Khalil Shakir	208	2018 2019 2020 2021
6	Titus Young	204	2007 2008 2009 2010
7	Don Hutt	189	1970 1971 1972 1973
8	Jeremy Childs	168	2006 2007 2008
9	Ryan Ikebe	162	1993 1994 1995 1996
10	Mike Wilson	159	1990 1991 1992 1993

Single season
Rank	Player	Rec	Year
1	Matt Miller	88	2013
1	Thomas Sperbeck	88	2015
3	Cedrick Wilson Jr.	83	2017
4	Jeremy Childs	82	2007
5	Thomas Sperbeck	80	2016
6	Titus Young	79	2009
7	Shane Williams-Rhodes	77	2013
7	Khalil Shakir	77	2021
9	Mike Wilson	76	1992
10	Jeremy Childs	72	2008

Single game
Rank	Player	Rec	Year	Opponent
1	Thomas Sperbeck	20	2015	New Mexico
2	Tim Gilligan	16	2003	Louisiana Tech
3	Don Hutt	15	1973	UC-Davis
4	Don Hutt	14	1973	Louisiana Tech
4	Mike Holton	14	1974	UNLV
4	Mike Wilson	14	1992	Eastern Washington
4	Shane Williams-Rhodes	14	2014	Ole Miss (Chick-fil-A Kickoff Game)
8	Don Hutt	13	1973	South Dakota
8	Rodney Smith	13	1997	Idaho
8	Rodney Smith	13	1997	Nevada
8	Shane Williams-Rhodes	13	2013	Utah State
8	Cedrick Wilson Jr.	13	2017	Virginia

=== Receiving yards ===
Career
Rank	Player	Yards	Years
1	Thomas Sperbeck	3,601	2013 2014 2015 2016
2	Titus Young	3,063	2007 2008 2009 2010
3	Matt Miller	3,049	2011 2012 2013 2014
4	Khalil Shakir	2,878	2018 2019 2020 2021
5	Austin Pettis	2,838	2007 2008 2009 2010
6	Ryan Ikebe	2,751	1993 1994 1995 1996
7	Don Hutt	2,728	1970 1971 1972 1973
8	Cedrick Wilson Jr.	2,640	2016 2017
9	Lou Fanucchi	2,554	1999 2000 2001 2002
10	Mike Holton	2,354	1972 1974 1975 1976
10	Terry Hutt	2,354	1973 1974 1976 1977

Single season
Rank	Player	Yards	Year
1	Cedrick Wilson Jr.	1,511	2017
2	Thomas Sperbeck	1,412	2015
3	Thomas Sperbeck	1,272	2016
4	Titus Young	1,215	2010
5	Tim Gilligan	1,192	2003
6	Matt Miller	1,140	2013
7	Billy Wingfield	1,138	2002
8	Cedrick Wilson Jr.	1,129	2016
9	Khalil Shakir	1,117	2021
10	Kipp Bedard	1,101	1981

Single game
Rank	Player	Yards	Year	Opponent
1	Thomas Sperbeck	281	2015	New Mexico
2	Winky White	264	1990	Nevada
3	Tim Gilligan	255	2003	Louisiana Tech
4	Mike Holton	252	1974	UNLV
5	Rasean Jones	230	2026	Oregon State
6	Don Hutt	227	1973	UC-Davis
7	Cedrick Wilson Jr.	221	2017	Oregon (Las Vegas Bowl)
8	Kipp Bedard	212	1980	Eastern Kentucky
9	Tim Gilligan	209	2003	BYU
9	Cedrick Wilson Jr.	209	2017	Virginia

=== Receiving touchdowns ===
Career
Rank	Player	TDs	Years
1	Austin Pettis	39	2007 2008 2009 2010
2	Don Hutt	30	1970 1971 1972 1973
3	Matt Miller	29	2011 2012 2013 2014
4	Ryan Ikebe	27	1993 1994 1995 1996
5	Titus Young	25	2007 2008 2009 2010
6	Tyler Shoemaker	25	2008 2009 2010 2011
7	John Smith	24	1972 1973 1974 1975
8	Mike Holton	21	1972 1974 1975 1976
9	Rodney Smith	20	1997 1998
9	Thomas Sperbeck	20	2013 2014 2015 2016
9	Khalil Shakir	20	2018 2019 2020 2021

Single season
Rank	Player	TDs	Year
1	Tyler Shoemaker	16	2011
2	Austin Pettis	14	2009
3	Mike Holton	13	1974
4	Jeb Putzier	12	2001
4	Matt Miller	12	2013
6	John Smith	11	1975
6	Ryan Ikebe	11	1994
6	Rodney Smith	11	1997
6	Cedrick Wilson Jr.	11	2016
10	John Smith	10	1974
10	Titus Young	10	2009
10	Austin Pettis	10	2010

Single game
Rank	Player	TDs	Year	Opponent
1	Don Hutt	4	1971	Montana State
1	John Smith	4	1974	Montana
1	Rodney Smith	4	1998	New Mexico State
1	Austin Pettis	4	2009	Idaho
5	24 times by 18 players	3	Most recent: **Rasean Jones**, 2026 vs. Oregon State	

== Total offense ==
Total offense is the sum of passing and rushing statistics. It does not include receiving or returns.

=== Total offense yards ===
Career
Rank	Player	Yards	Years
1	Kellen Moore	14,534	2008 2009 2010 2011
2	Brett Rypien	13,350	2015 2016 2017 2018
3	Tony Hilde	10,138	1993 1994 1995 1996
4	Bart Hendricks	10,039	1997 1998 1999 2000
5	Ryan Dinwiddie	9,984	2000 2001 2002 2003
6	**Maddux Madsen**	9,544	2022 2023 2024 2025 2026
7	Jared Zabransky	9,119	2003 2004 2005 2006
8	Grant Hedrick	6,627	2011 2012 2013 2014
9	Hank Bachmeier	6,613	2019 2020 2021 2022
10	Jim McMillan	6,115	1971 1972 1973 1974

Single season
Rank	Player	Yards	Year
1	Ryan Dinwiddie	4,399	2003
2	Ryan Dinwiddie	4,288	2004
3	Kellen Moore	3,813	2010
4	Kellen Moore	3,734	2011
5	Bart Hendricks	3,633	2000
6	Brett Rypien	3,630	2016
7	Brett Rypien	3,586	2018
8	Kellen Moore	3,531	2009
9	Kellen Moore	3,456	2008
10	Taylor Tharp	3,408	2007

Single game
Rank	Player	Yards	Year	Opponent
1	Ryan Dinwiddie	542	2003	Louisiana Tech
2	Ryan Dinwiddie	515	2003	SMU
3	Kellen Moore	507	2010	Hawaii
4	Grant Hedrick	498	2014	New Mexico
5	Brett Rypien	490	2015	New Mexico
6	Brett Rypien	473	2015	UNLV
7	Jim McMillan	471	1974	UNLV
8	Kellen Moore	457	2011	Toledo
9	Bart Hendricks	439	2000	Utah State
9	Grant Hedrick	439	2014	BYU

=== Touchdowns responsible for ===
"Touchdowns responsible for" is the official NCAA term for combined rushing and passing touchdowns. It does not include receiving or returns.

Career
Rank	Player	TDs	Years
1	Kellen Moore	145	2008 2009 2010 2011
2	Ryan Dinwiddie	100	2000 2001 2002 2003
3	Bart Hendricks	98	1997 1998 1999 2000
4	Brett Rypien	92	2015 2016 2017 2018
5	Tony Hilde	89	1993 1994 1995 1996
5	Jared Zabransky	89	2003 2004 2005 2006

Single season
Rank	Player	TDs	Year
1	Ryan Dinwiddie	43	2003
1	Kellen Moore	43	2011
3	Bart Hendricks	41	2000
4	Kellen Moore	40	2009
5	Kellen Moore	36	2010

== All-purpose yardage ==
All-purpose yardage is the sum of all yards credited to a player who is in possession of the ball. It includes rushing, receiving, and returns, but does not include passing.

Boise State's record book does not break down single-game all-purpose yardage records by type of play.

Contrary to standard NCAA statistical practice, which does not include either Division I-A (now FBS) bowl games or Division I-AA (now FCS) playoff games prior to 2002 in individual statistics, Boise State's all-purpose yardage records include all bowl and playoff games.

Career
Rank	Player	Yards	Years
1	Brock Forsey	7,425	1999 2000 2001 2002 2003
2	Chris Thomas	6,488	1988 1989 1990 1991
3	Ashton Jeanty	5,664	2022 2023 2024
4	Cedric Minter	5,416	1977 1978 1979 1980
5	David Mikell	5,201	2000 2001 2002 2003
6	Jay Ajayi	5,156	2012 2013 2014
7	Ian Johnson	4,952	2005 2006 2007 2008
8	Titus Young	4,820	2007 2008 2009 2010
9	Doug Martin	4,123	2008 2009 2010 2011
10	Jeremy McNichols	4,080	2014 2015 2016

Single season
Rank	Player	Yards	Year
1	Chris Thomas	3,007	1989
2	Ashton Jeanty	2,750	2024
3	Jay Ajayi	2,358	2014
4	K. C. Adams	2,297	1994
5	Jeremy McNichols	2,255	2016
6	Brock Forsey	2,127	2002
7	Titus Young	2,012	2009
8	Cedrick Wilson Jr.	1,989	2017
9	Brock Forsey	1,938	2001
10	Titus Young	1,916	2010
	Ashton Jeanty	1,916	2023

Single game
Rank	Player	Yards	Year	Opponent
1	Doug Martin	301	2011	Arizona State (Maaco Bowl Las Vegas)
2	Dylan Riley	300	2026	Colorado State
3	Brock Forsey	292	2000	Northern Iowa
4	David Mikell	289	2003	Idaho
5	Alexander Mattison	286	2017	Colorado State
6	Thomas Sperbeck	281	2015	New Mexico
7	Jay Ajayi	280	2014	Colorado State
8	Tim Gilligan	279	2003	BYU
9	Brock Forsey	276	2002	Tulsa
10	Ashton Jeanty	271	2024	Georgia Southern

== Defense ==
=== Interceptions ===
Career
Rank	Player	Ints	Years
1	Steve Forrey	24	1968 1969 1970
2	Frank Robinson	22	1988 1989 1990 1991
3	Darian Thompson	19	2012 2013 2014 2015
4	Gabe Franklin	18	2001 2002 2003 2004
5	Donte Deayon	17	2012 2013 2014 2015
6	Joe Larkin	15	1971 1972
	Darrin Lyle	15	1988 1989 1990 1991
8	Ken Johnson	14	1968 1969 1970 1971
	Marty Tadman	14	2004 2005 2006 2007
10	Dempsy Dees	13	1997 1998 1999 2000
	Brandyn Thompson	13	2007 2008 2009 2010

Single season
Rank	Player	Ints	Year
1	Steve Forrey	12	1968
2	Ken Johnson	9	1969
	Joe Larkin	9	1971
4	Steve Forrey	8	1969
	Frank Robinson	8	1991
	Gabe Franklin	8	2002
7	Anthony Brown	7	1990
	Rashid Gayle	7	1994
	Darian Thompson	7	2014

Single game
Rank	Player	Ints	Year	Opponent
1	Steve Forrey	4	1968	Idaho State
2	Steve Forrey	3	1968	Whitworth
	Ken Johnson	3	1969	Hiram Scott
	Greg Frederick	3	1973	UC-Davis
	Frank Robinson	3	1990	Northern Iowa
	Jason Payne	3	1995	Weber State
	Chris Carr	3	2003	Nevada
	Korey Hall	3	2004	Oregon State
	Brandyn Thompson	3	2008	Hawaii

=== Tackles ===
Career
Rank	Player	Tackles	Years
1	Scott Russell	415	1987 1988 1989 1990
2	Quintin Mikell	401	1999 2000 2001 2002
3	Carl Keever	397	1982 1983 1984
4	Korey Hall	394	2003 2004 2005 2006
5	Andy Avalos	355	2001 2002 2003 2004
6	Ray Santucci	333	1978 1979 1980 1981
	Brian Smith	333	1992 1993 1994 1995
8	Kenny Kuehl	332	1987 1988 1989 1990
9	Jim Ellis	331	1983 1984 1985 1986
10	Jeron Johnson	328	2007 2008 2009 2010

Single season
Rank	Player	Tackles	Year
1	Scott Russell	164	1988
2	Dan Williams	160	1980
3	Ray Santucci	141	1979
	Leighton Vander Esch	141	2017
5	Scott Monk	140	1992
6	Curt Hecker	139	1981
7	Mark Williams	138	1987
8	Carl Keever	136	1982
9	Bob Macauley	135	1978
10	Kenny Kuehl	132	1988

Single game
Rank	Player	Tackles	Year	Opponent
1	Scott Russell	28	1988	Northern Arizona
2	Carl Keever	24	1982	Idaho

=== Sacks ===
Career
Rank	Player	Sacks	Years
1	Erik Helgeson	54.5	1987 1988 1989 1990
2	Curtis Weaver	34.0	2017 2018 2019
3	Chris Wing	32.0	1994 1995 1996
4	Ahmed Hassanein	24.0	2021 2022 2023 2024
5	Greg Sabala	23.0	1990 1991 1992 1993
6	Shawn Anderson	22.5	1988 1989 1990 1991
7	Ryan Winterswyk	21.5	2007 2008 2009 2010
8	Shea McClellin	20.5	2008 2009 2010 2011
9	Durelle Goodloe	20.0	1989 1990 1991 1992
	DeMarcus Lawrence	20.0	2012 2013
	Kamalei Correa	20.0	2013 2014 2015

Single season
Rank	Player	Sacks	Year
1	Chris Wing	20.0	1996
2	Erik Helgeson	19.5	1988
3	Erik Helgeson	17.5	1989
4	Pete Kwiatkowski	15.0	1987
5	Curtis Weaver	13.5	2019
6	Ahmed Hassanein	12.5	2023
7	Kamalei Correa	12.0	2014
8	Curtis Weaver	11.0	2017
9	Joe O'Brien	10.5	1994
	DeMarcus Lawrence	10.5	2013

== Kicking ==
=== Field goals made ===
Career
Rank	Player	FGs	Years
1	Jonah Dalmas	93	2020 2021 2022 2023 2024
2	Kyle Brotzman	67	2007 2008 2009 2010
3	Mike Black	51	1988 1989 1990 1991
4	Tyler Jones	46	2001 2002 2003 2004
5	Nick Calaycay	45	1999 2000 2001 2002
6	Greg Erickson	37	1992 1993 1994 1995
7	Dan Goodale	36	2011 2012 2013 2014
8	Roberto Moran	34	1985 1986
	Tyler Rausa	34	2014 2015 2016
10	Kenrick Camerud	30	1979 1980 1981
	Haden Hoggarth	30	2017 2018

Single season
Rank	Player	FGs	Year
1	Jonah Dalmas	26	2021
2	Tyler Rausa	25	2015
3	Tyler Jones	24	2004
	Jonah Dalmas	24	2023
5	Jonah Dalmas	23	2022
6	Mike Dodd	22	1992
7	Tyler Jones	19	2003
8	Roberto Moran	18	1986
	Kyle Brotzman	18	2009
	Haden Hoggarth	18	2017

Single game
Rank	Player	FGs	Year	Opponent
1	Roberto Moran	5	1985	Idaho State
	Eric Guthrie	5	1974	Northern Arizona
	Eric Sachse	5	2019	Florida State
5	18 times by 9 players	4	Most recent: Jonah Dalmas, 2022 vs. Air Force	

=== Field goal percentage ===
Minimum of 25 attempts for career records and 10 attempts for single-season records.

Career
Rank	Player	FG%	Years
1	Jonah Dalmas	86.1%	2020 2021 2022 2023 2024
2	Nick Calaycay	80.4%	1999 2000 2001 2002
3	Dan Goodale	80.0%	2011 2012 2013 2014

Single season
Rank	Player	FG%	Year
1	Nick Calaycay	93.8%	2000
2	Jonah Dalmas	92.9%	2021
3	Dan Goodale	89.5%	2013

== Scoring ==
=== Points ===
Career
Rank	Player	Points	Years
1	Jonah Dalmas	508	2020 2021 2022 2023 2024
2	Kyle Brotzman	439	2007 2008 2009 2010
3	Brock Forsey	408	1999 2000 2001 2002
4	Jay Ajayi	396	2012 2013 2014
5	Nick Calaycay	366	1999 2000 2001 2002
6	Ian Johnson	356	2005 2006 2007 2008
7	Ashton Jeanty	336	2022 2023 2024
8	Jeremy McNichols	330	2014 2015 2016
9	Mike Black	300	1988 1989 1990 1991
10	Tyler Jones	294	2001 2002 2003 2004

Single season
Rank	Player	Points	Year
1	Brock Forsey	192	2002
2	Jay Ajayi	192	2014
3	Ashton Jeanty	180	2024
4	Jeremy McNichols	162	2016
5	Jeremy McNichols	156	2015
6	Ian Johnson	152	2006
7	Tyler Jones	141	2004
8	Tyler Rausa	134	2015
9	Tyler Jones	132	2003
10	Jonah Dalmas	120	2023

Single game
Rank	Player	Points	Year	Opponent
1	Ashton Jeanty	36	2024	Georgia Southern
2	Jon Helmandollar	30	2004	Louisiana Tech
2	Ian Johnson	24	2006	Oregon State
2	Jay Ajayi	30	2014	Oregon State
2	**Dylan Riley**	30	2025	Air Force
6	27 times by 15 players	24	Most recent: Ashton Jeanty, 2024 vs. Washington State	

=== Touchdowns ===
In official NCAA statistics, touchdown totals include touchdowns scored. Accordingly, these lists include rushing, receiving, and return touchdowns, but not passing touchdowns.

Career
Rank	Player	TDs	Years
1	Brock Forsey	68	1999 2000 2001 2002
2	Jay Ajayi	66	2012 2013 2014
3	Ian Johnson	59	2005 2006 2007 2008
4	Ashton Jeanty	56	2022 2023 2024
5	Jeremy McNichols	55	2014 2015 2016
6	Doug Martin	48	2008 2009 2010 2011
7	Cedric Minter	45	1977 1978 1979 1980
8	John Smith	42	1972 1973 1974 1975
9	D.J. Harper	41	2007 2008 2009 2010 2011 2012
10	David Mikell	39	2000 2001 2002 2003

Single season
Rank	Player	TDs	Year
1	Brock Forsey	32	2002
	Jay Ajayi	32	2014
3	Ashton Jeanty	30	2024
4	Jeremy McNichols	27	2016
5	Jeremy McNichols	26	2015
6	Ian Johnson	25	2006
7	Doug Martin	19	2011
	Jay Ajayi	19	2013
	Ashton Jeanty	19	2023
10	6 times by 5 players	17	Most recent: Alexander Mattison, 2018

Single game
Rank	Player	TDs	Year	Opponent
1	Ashton Jeanty	6	2024	Georgia Southern
2	Jon Helmandollar	5	2004	Louisiana Tech
2	Ian Johnson	5	2006	Oregon State
2	Jay Ajayi	5	2014	Oregon State
2	**Dylan Riley**	5	2025	Air Force
6	27 times by 15 players	4	Most recent: Ashton Jeanty, 2024 vs. Washington State	
