= 2014 Fiesta Bowl =

2014 Fiesta Bowl may refer to:

- 2014 Fiesta Bowl (January), played as part of the 2013–14 college football bowl season between the UCF Knights and the Baylor Bears
- 2014 Fiesta Bowl (December), played as part of the 2014–15 college football bowl season between the Boise State Broncos and the Arizona Wildcats
