= Jim McMillan (Canadian football) =

American gridiron football player (born 1952)

No. 12
- Position: Quarterback

Personal information
- Born: November 29, 1952 (age 73)
- Listed height: 6 ft 1 in (1.85 m)
- Listed weight: 175 lb (79 kg)

Career information
- High school: Vallivue (Caldwell, Idaho)
- College: Boise State (1971–1974)
- NFL draft: 1975: 14th round, 350th overall pick

Career history
- 1975: Hamilton Tiger-Cats

Awards and highlights
- First-team All-American (1974); Big Sky Offensive Player of the Year (1974); 2× First-team All-Big Sky (1973–1974); Boise State Broncos No. 12 retired

Jim McMillan (born November 29, 1952) is an American former professional football quarterback who played one season with the Hamilton Tiger-Cats of the Canadian Football League (CFL). He was selected by the Detroit Lions in the fourteenth round of the 1975 NFL draft after playing college football at Boise State College.

== Early life ==
Jim McMillan was born on November 29, 1952. He attended Vallivue High School in Caldwell, Idaho.

== College career ==
McMillan was a member of the Boise State Broncos of Boise State College from 1971 to 1974 and a three-year letterman from 1972 to 1974. He completed six of 12 passes for 56 yards and two interceptions as a freshman in 1971. He completed 74 of 136 passes (54%) for 1,027 yards, eight touchdowns, and seven interceptions in 1973. His junior year in 1974, McMillan recorded 110 completions on 179 passing attempts (61%) for 1,525 yards, 17 touchdowns, and five interceptions while also rushing 90 times for 368 yards and four touchdowns, earning unanimous first-team All-Big Sky Conference honors. The 1973 Broncos finished the regular season with a 9–2 record, winning the first Big Sky title in school history. They were invited to the first-ever NCAA Division II playoffs, where they beat South Dakota 53–10 in the quarterfinals before losing to Louisiana Tech 38–34 in the semifinals. In 1974, McMillan totaled 192 completions on 313 attempts (61%) for 2,900 yards, 33 touchdowns, and 15 interceptions while also rushing 90 times for 201 yards and two touchdowns. He was named the 1974 Big Sky Offensive Player of the Year and also named a Division II All-American by the Associated Press, United Press International, and Kodak. The 1974 Broncos finished the regular season with a 10–1 record, winning the Big Sky for the second consecutive season. They lost in the Division II quarterfinals to Central Michigan by a score of 20–6. McMillian set school career records for most passing yards with 5,508, passing touchdowns with 58, and total offensive yards with 6,115. He also set the single-game and single-season records in all three categories as well. He majored in physical education at Boise State. His jersey number of 12 was retired by Boise State in 1978 and is still the only number ever retired by the school. He was inducted into the Boise State Hall of Fame in 1982.

== Professional career ==
McMillan was selected by the Detroit Lions in the fourteenth round, with the 350th overall pick, of the 1975 NFL draft but did not sign with them. He dressed in all 16 games for the Hamilton Tiger-Cats of the Canadian Football League (CFL) during the 1975 CFL season, completing 64 of 155 passes (41.3%) for 868 yards, six touchdowns, and 17 interceptions. He also rushed 47 times for 297 yards.

== See also ==
- List of NCAA football retired numbers
- Boise State Broncos football statistical leaders
