= Brett Rypien =

American football player (born 1996)

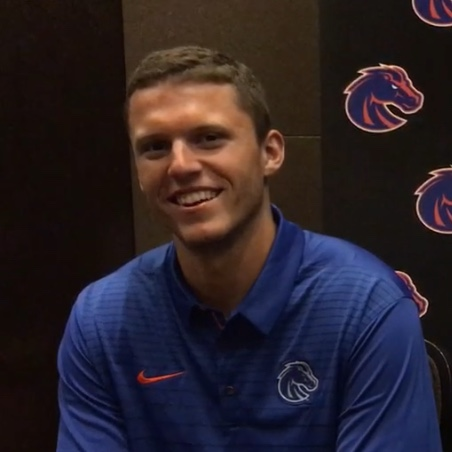
- Rypien in 2017

No. 16 – Las Vegas Raiders
- Position: Quarterback
- Roster status: Practice squad

Personal information
- Born: July 9, 1996 (age 30); Spokane, Washington, U.S.
- Listed height: 6 ft 2 in (1.88 m)
- Listed weight: 200 lb (91 kg)

Career information
- High school: Shadle Park (Spokane)
- College: Boise State (2015–2018)
- NFL draft: 2019: undrafted

Career history
- Denver Broncos (2019–2022); Los Angeles Rams (2023); Seattle Seahawks (2023); New York Jets (2023); Chicago Bears (2024)*; Minnesota Vikings (2024); Cincinnati Bengals (2025); Indianapolis Colts (2025); Minnesota Vikings (2025); Houston Texans (2026)*; Tampa Bay Buccaneers (2026)*; Las Vegas Raiders (2026–present)*
- * Offseason or practice squad member only

Awards and highlights
- MW Offensive Player of the Year (2018); MW Freshman of the Year (2015); 3× First-team All-MW (2015, 2016, 2018); Second-team All-MW (2017)

Career NFL statistics as of 2026
- Passing attempts: 168
- Passing completions: 98
- Completion percentage: 58.3%
- TD–INT: 4–9
- Passing yards: 950
- Passer rating: 59.9
- Stats at Pro Football Reference

Brett Robert Rypien (RIP-in; born July 9, 1996) is an American professional football quarterback for the Las Vegas Raiders of the National Football League (NFL). He played college football for the Boise State Broncos and signed with the Denver Broncos as an undrafted free agent in 2019. He has also been a member of the Los Angeles Rams, Seattle Seahawks, New York Jets, Chicago Bears, Minnesota Vikings, Cincinnati Bengals, and Indianapolis Colts.

== Early life ==
Rypien was born to Tim and Julie Rypien in Spokane, Washington. Growing up, he was a multiple-sport athlete, playing football in addition to baseball, the sport his father had played at the minor league level.

Rypien attended Shadle Park High School in Spokane, Washington. At Shadle Park he played quarterback for all four years of high school. By the time he graduated, he had set Washington state records for career passing yards (13,044), formerly held by former Boise State quarterback Kellen Moore; pass completions (1,006); single-season records for passing yards (4,552) and touchdowns (50), both previously held by Moore; single-game records for passing yards (613); and pass completions (44). Rypien graduated early from Shadle Park as a 4.0 grade point average student, earning valedictorian honors.

Rypien was rated by both Rivals and Scout as a four-star recruit coming out of high school. He verbally committed to Boise State University in April 2014 and enrolled in January 2015.

College recruiting
Name	Hometown	School	Height	Weight	Commit date
Brett Rypien; QB	Spokane, Washington	Shadle Park High School	6 ft 2 in (1.88 m)	185 lb (84 kg)	Apr 5, 2014
Brett Rypien; QB	Recruit ratings: Scout: Rivals: 247Sports:				
Overall recruit ranking: Scout: 15 (QB) Rivals: 8 (QB), 1 (WA rank)
Note: In many cases, Scout, Rivals, 247Sports, On3, and ESPN may conflict in their listings of height and weight.; In these cases, the average was taken. ESPN grades are on a 100-point scale.; Sources: "2015 Boise State Football Recruiting Commits". Scout.; "Scout.com Team Recruiting Rankings". Scout.; "2015 Team Ranking". Rivals.com.

== College career ==
=== 2015 ===
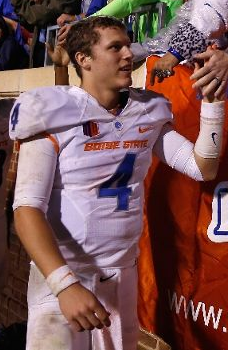
Boise State football quarterback Brett Rypien greeting fans after a victory during the 2015 season

Rypien began taking classes at Boise State in January 2015; he had enrolled early so he could take part in spring practices. With two-year starting quarterback Grant Hedrick graduating from Boise State, it left a hole at the quarterback position. On August 23, at the close of fall practice, Ryan Finley was named the Broncos' starting quarterback and Rypien was left to redshirt for his freshman season.

In the third game of the Broncos' season, against Idaho State, Finley was tackled from behind in the first half of the game, breaking his left ankle, which would require an eight-week recovery time. Rypien entered the game in the second half, burning his redshirt, and led the offense to scores on each of his four possessions, three touchdowns and one field goal. Rypien became the first true freshman quarterback to play in a game for Boise State since 1993.

In Rypien's first three starts of his Boise State career, the Broncos averaged over 50 points per game, and Rypien averaged over 300 yards in each contest and totaled eight touchdowns. In his sixth start, against the UNLV Rebels, he set the Boise State record for most passing yards in a game by a freshman, besting Kellen Moore's previous mark of 414 yards with 469 yards of his own. In the following game, Rypien topped his own record by passing for 506 yards against the New Mexico Lobos.

For Rypien's efforts he was named the first-team all-conference quarterback of the Mountain West Conference (MW), becoming the first freshman to do so in the conference's 17-year history. In addition to earning first-team all-conference, Rypien was also awarded Freshman of the Year honors of the Mountain West.

Rypien and the Broncos finished the season with a 9–4 record, and concluded the season with a record-setting win in the Poinsettia Bowl against the Northern Illinois Huskies. Rypien also picked up the offensive MVP honor for this performance.

=== 2016 ===
In Rypien's second year at Boise State, he was with new coordinators in Zak Hill and Scott Huff after Eliah Drinkwitz left to take a coordinator position at NC State. With the hire of new offensive coordinators, and Ryan Finley returning from a broken ankle, Bryan Harsin stated that there would be an open quarterback competition during spring practices.

On December 27, 2015, Alex Ogle announced his decision to transfer to Arizona Western College. There remained just two other scholarship quarterbacks on the roster entering spring practice competing against Rypien. On April 12, 2016, after the conclusion of spring practices, Ryan Finley announced he would also be transferring to North Carolina State after he graduated in May.

Rypien was named to three separate award watch lists before the start of fall camp. He was named to the watch lists for the Davey O'Brien Award, which goes to the top collegiate quarterback; the Maxwell Award, which goes to the top collegiate football player of the year; and the Walter Camp Award, which goes to the player of the year in college football. Also before the start of the season, Rypien was named as one of four team captains by his teammates, becoming the first sophomore captain in more than a decade for Boise State.

Rypien's first month of the season came with highs and lows. Off the football field, he lost both his grandmothers, but on the field he led the Broncos to a 5–0 start and earned offensive player of the week honors in the Mountain West after throwing for 391 yards and five touchdowns in the first half against New Mexico.

After starting the season with seven wins, Rypien and the Broncos lost two of their last five games to finish the regular season at 10–2. For Rypien's efforts in the season he earned first-team all-conference honors, his second time receiving the honor.

On December 27, Rypien and Boise State matched up to play against Baylor in the Cactus Bowl in Phoenix, Arizona. Baylor won the game and the Boise State Broncos finished their season with a record of 10–3.

=== 2017 ===
In Rypien's third year at Boise State, he again was entering a season after an offensive coordinator had left. Co-offensive coordinator Scott Huff left to become the offensive line coach at the University of Washington. With the departure of Huff, remaining co-offensive coordinator Zak Hill would be Rypien's offensive coordinator for the season.

On December 26, 2016, the day before the bowl matchup between Boise State and Baylor, it was announced that Tommy Stuart would transfer after the end of the season. This left Rypien as the only quarterback on the roster with playing experience entering the 2017 season.

Rypien was named to four separate award watch lists before the start of fall camp. He was named to the watch lists for the Davey O'Brien Award, which goes to the top collegiate quarterback; the Maxwell Award, which goes to the top collegiate football player of the year; the Walter Camp Award, which goes to the player of the year in college football; and the Wuerffel Trophy, which is awarded to the college football player who best combines exemplary community service with athletic and academic achievement. Also before the start of the season, Rypien represented the offensive side for Boise State at the Mountain West Football Media Days at the Cosmopolitan in Las Vegas, and was named as one of three team captains by his teammates.

Rypien and the Broncos began the season with a win over the Troy Trojans. In that game, Rypien shared time with dual-threat quarterback Montell Cozart, a graduate transfer from Kansas. In the following game against Washington State, the second of the season, Rypien suffered an injury on a sack which forced him to leave the game before the end of the first quarter. As a result of the injury, Rypien missed the subsequent game against New Mexico. Rypien and the Broncos went on to finish the season with a 10–3 regular season record, and winning the Mountain West Championship game against Fresno State. At the conclusion of the season he earned second-team all-conference honors.

On December 16, Rypien and Boise State matched up to play against the University of Oregon in the Las Vegas Bowl in Las Vegas, Nevada. Boise State won the game and finished their season with a record of 11–3.

=== 2018 ===
In Rypien's fourth and final year at Boise State, he would be going into the season without an offensive coordinator change. Offensive coordinator Zak Hill began his second season as the lone offensive coordinator.

Rypien was named to six separate award watch lists before the start of fall camp. He was named to the watch lists for the Maxwell Award, which goes to the top collegiate football player of the year; the Davey O'Brien Award, which goes to the top collegiate quarterback; the Wuerffel Trophy, which is awarded to the college football player who best combines exemplary community service with athletic and academic achievement; the Walter Camp Award, which is awarded to the player of the year in college football; the Johnny Unitas Golden Arm Award, which goes to the nation's most outstanding senior or fourth-year quarterback; and the Manning Award, which is given to the nation's best collegiate quarterback. Also before the start of the season, Rypien represented the offensive side for Boise State at the Mountain West Football Media Days at the Cosmopolitan in Las Vegas. While there, he was chosen as the preseason conference offensive player of the year and was selected to the conference's preseason all-conference team. At the close of camp, and for the third straight year, Rypien was named as one of three team captains by his teammates for the 2018 season.

Rypien started the year strongly by throwing for 12 touchdowns with zero interceptions through the first four games. After the second game of the season, he won Mountain West Offensive Player of the Week when he led the Broncos to a 62–7 victory against the University of Connecticut, going 21 of 28 passing for 362 yards and four touchdowns with zero interceptions while helping Boise State put up 818 total yards of offense and a 625 yardage gap between the two teams, the largest gap since 2000. During his strong start to the season, Rypien surpassed Kellen Moore for most 300-yard passing games in school history with 17, and finished his career with 21.

Rypien and the Broncos went on to finish the season with a 10–3 regular season record, losing the Mountain West Championship game in overtime against Fresno State. At the conclusion of the season, his efforts won him the MW Player of the year and he was also named the first-team all-conference quarterback of the Mountain West.

On December 26, Rypien and Boise State matched up to play against Boston College in the First Responder Bowl in Dallas, Texas. Due to lightning strikes, the game was suspended in the first quarter and was eventually ruled as a no-contest for both teams. On January 19, 2019, he completed his college football career at the 2019 East–West Shrine Game. He went 10 of 14 passing for 134 yards and a touchdown on a shared rotation.

Rypien finished his collegiate career as the FBS leader in passing yards (13,581) among current players. He finished as the all-time leader in passing yards (13,581), completions (1,036) and 300-yard passing performances (21) in the Mountain West. In addition to his conference records, he ranks second all-time at Boise State in passing yards (13,581), passing touchdowns (90), completions (1,036), attempts (1,618).

== Professional career ==
=== 2019 NFL draft ===
Rypien was expected to be selected in the latter half of the 2019 NFL draft after an impressive career at Boise State, and after putting up impressive passing numbers landing in second in all major passing statistics at Boise State. NFL analysts commented that he was "comfortable and experienced playing from under center" and an "accurate passer on all three levels", but noted concerns over his hand size and lack of arm strength.

External videos
- Rypien's NFL Combine workout

Pre-draft measurables
Height	Weight	Arm length	Hand span	Wingspan	40-yard dash	10-yard split	20-yard split	20-yard shuttle	Three-cone drill	Vertical jump	Broad jump	Wonderlic
6 ft 1 5/8 in (1.87 m)	210 lb (95 kg)	30 3/8 in (0.77 m)	9 in (0.23 m)	6 ft 0 3/8 in (1.84 m)	4.91 s	1.68 s	2.86 s	4.29 s	7.10 s	33.0 in (0.84 m)	9 ft 8 in (2.95 m)	28
All values are from NFL Combine

=== Denver Broncos ===
On April 27, 2019, at the conclusion of the NFL draft, Rypien tweeted that he would "stay a Bronco" after signing with the Denver Broncos as an undrafted free agent for a guaranteed salary of $146,000 and with a signing bonus of $10,000. Kyle McCarthy, Rypien's agent, also noted that besides the Broncos, there were offers from a double-digit number of teams but it was Rypien's relationship with coordinator Rich Scangarello that was the largest lure in choosing the Broncos.

==== 2019 season ====
On May 2, 2019, the Broncos reported their signing of Rypien as an undrafted free agent. He was waived on August 31, 2019, and was signed to the practice squad the following day. He was promoted to the active roster on November 1, 2019, to be the backup quarterback to Brandon Allen after starter Joe Flacco suffered a neck injury. On November 30, 2019, the Broncos waived Rypien after Drew Lock was activated off of injured reserve. He was then re-signed to the practice squad two days later. He signed a reserve/future contract with the Broncos on December 31, 2019.

==== 2020 season ====
On September 5, 2020, Rypien was waived by the Broncos, and was signed to the practice squad the following day. He was promoted to the active roster on September 25, 2020. He got his first in-game action on September 27, 2020, when he entered the game against the Tampa Bay Buccaneers in relief of starter Jeff Driskel. He completed his first 8 passes for 53 yards before throwing a game-ending interception during the 28–10 loss.

On September 29, 2020, Rypien was named the starter for the Broncos Week 4 matchup against the New York Jets on Thursday Night Football. In his first NFL start, Rypien led the Broncos to a 37–28 victory over the Jets throwing for 242 yards, with two touchdowns and three interceptions. On November 28, 2020, Rypien was placed on the reserve/COVID-19 list after coming in close contact with Jeff Driskel, who tested positive for the virus. Rypien and the other three quarterbacks on the Broncos roster were fined by the team for violating COVID-19 protocols. He was activated on December 1.

==== 2021 season ====
On August 31, 2021, Rypien was waived by the Broncos and re-signed to the practice squad the next day. He was promoted to the active roster on September 28, 2021. He appeared in one game in the 2021 season. He had two incomplete passes in Week 17 against the Los Angeles Chargers.

==== 2022 season ====
On October 22, 2022, Rypien was named the starter for Denver's Week 7 matchup against the Jets after Russell Wilson was ruled out with a hamstring injury. He passed for 225 yards and an interception in a 16–9 loss to the Jets. He got a second start in Week 15, a 24–15 victory over the Arizona Cardinals. He had 197 passing yards, one touchdown, and one interception in the victory.

=== Los Angeles Rams ===
On May 4, 2023, Rypien signed with the Los Angeles Rams. He was released on August 29 and re-signed to the practice squad. Rypien was promoted to the active roster on September 13. Rypien was waived by the Rams on November 7 after losing to the Green Bay Packers in his season starting debut.

=== Seattle Seahawks ===
On November 10, 2023, the Seattle Seahawks signed Rypien to their practice squad. He was elevated to the active roster on November 23.

=== New York Jets ===
On December 5, 2023, Rypien was signed by the Jets off the Seahawks practice squad.

=== Chicago Bears ===
On March 13, 2024, Rypien signed a one-year contract with the Chicago Bears. He was released on August 27, 2024.

=== Minnesota Vikings (first stint) ===
On August 29, 2024, Rypien signed with the Minnesota Vikings. On January 7, 2025, he was waived by the Vikings to make room for Daniel Jones. However, Rypien re-signed with the Vikings to their practice squad on January 9. On August 24, Rypien was released by the Vikings.

=== Cincinnati Bengals ===
On August 27, 2025, Rypien signed with the Cincinnati Bengals' practice squad. On September 16, he was promoted to the active roster as Jake Browning's backup following Joe Burrow's injury. Rypien was released on October 7 after the team traded for Joe Flacco.

=== Indianapolis Colts ===
On October 15, 2025, Rypien was signed to the practice squad of the Indianapolis Colts. He was signed to the active roster on December 10. Rypien was released by Indianapolis on December 22.

=== Minnesota Vikings (second stint) ===
On December 23, 2025, Rypien was claimed off waivers by the Minnesota Vikings.

=== Houston Texans ===
On August 15, 2026, Rypien was signed to the Texans' training camp roster following a preseason injury to the Texans' third-string quarterback Graham Mertz. He was released by Houston on August 29.

=== Tampa Bay Buccnaeers ===
On September 30, 2026, Rypien signed with the Tampa Bay Buccaneers practice squad. On October 27, he was released.

=== Las Vegas Raiders ===
On November 16, 2026, Rypien signed with the Las Vegas Raiders practice squad.

== Career statistics ==
=== NFL ===
Year	Team	Games			Passing									Rushing					Sacks		Fumbles	
Year	Team	GP	GS	Record	Cmp	Att	Pct	Yds	Y/A	Lng	TD	Int	Rtg	Att	Yds	Avg	Lng	TD	Sck	SckY	Fum	Lost
2019	DEN	0	0	—	DNP																	
2020	DEN	3	1	1–0	27	40	67.5	295	7.4	48	2	4	66.1	5	-5	-1.0	-1	0	1	0	1	0
2021	DEN	1	0	—	0	2	0.0	0	0.0	0	0	0	39.6	0	0	0.0	0	0	0	0	0	0
2022	DEN	4	2	1–1	53	88	60.2	483	5.5	45	2	4	63.8	6	7	1.2	6	0	8	47	4	1
2023	LAR	2	1	0–1	18	38	47.4	172	4.5	34	0	1	49.5	3	19	6.3	8	0	2	18	2	1
2023	SEA	0	0	—	DNP																	
2023	NYJ	0	0	—	DNP																	
2024	MIN	0	0	—	DNP																	
2025	CIN	1	0	—	0	0	0.0	0	0.0	0	0	0	0.0	0	0	0.0	0	0	1	2	0	0
2025	IND	0	0	—	DNP																	
2025	MIN	0	0	—	DNP																	
Career		11	4	2–2	98	168	58.3	950	5.7	48	4	9	59.9	14	21	1.5	8	0	12	67	7	2

=== College ===
Season	Team	Games			Passing								Rushing			
Season	Team	GP	GS	Record	Cmp	Att	Pct	Yds	Avg	TD	Int	Rtg	Att	Yds	Avg	TD
2015	Boise State	11	10	7−3	273	430	63.5	3,353	7.8	20	8	140.6	41	-77	-1.9	1
2016	Boise State	13	13	10−3	244	394	61.9	3,646	9.3	24	8	155.7	48	-16	-0.3	2
2017	Boise State	13	13	10−3	218	348	62.6	2,877	8.3	16	6	143.8	37	-21	-0.6	0
2018	Boise State	13	13	10−3	301	447	67.3	3,705	8.3	30	7	156.0	85	12	0.1	0
Career		50	49	37−12	1,036	1,619	64.0	13,581	8.4	90	29	149.2	211	-102	-0.5	3

== Career highlights ==
=== Awards and honors ===
College

- MW Offensive Player of the Year (2018)
- MW Freshman of the Year (2015)
- 3× First-team All-MW (2015, 2016, 2018)
- Second-team All-MW (2017)

High school

- 2014 Washington State Player of the Year
- 3× Washington 3A All-State

=== Records ===
Washington state high school records

- Career passing yards (13,044)
- Career completions (1,006)
- Single-season passing yards (4,552)
- Single-season passing touchdowns (50)
- Single-game passing yards (613)
- Single-game completions (44)

== Personal life ==
Rypien is the nephew of former NFL quarterback Mark Rypien, the cousin of former LFL quarterback Angela Rypien, and a cousin-once-removed of the late Rick Rypien, an NHL enforcer who spent his entire seven-year career with the Vancouver Canucks. On his mother's side of the family, Rypien is the nephew of Chris Tormey, an assistant to the Ottawa Redblacks of the CFL. In 2019, prior to the NFL and CFL drafts, Rypien was reportedly working on formally securing Canadian citizenship; Rypien is eligible to hold dual citizenship because of his father's Canadian citizenship.
