= 2007 Hawaii Bowl =

2007 Sheraton Hawaii Bowl
Boise State Broncos	East Carolina Pirates
(10–2)	(7–5)
WAC	C-USA
38	41
Head coach: Chris Petersen	Head coach: Skip Holtz
AP / Coaches / BCS; 24 / 22 / 24
	1	2	3	4	Total
Boise State	7	7	10	14	38
East Carolina	10	21	7	3	41
- Date: December 23, 2007
- Season: 2007
- Stadium: Aloha Stadium
- Location: Honolulu, Hawaii, US
- MVP: RB Chris Johnson (East Carolina); RB Jeremy Avery (Boise State)
- Favorite: Boise State by 10½
- Referee: Terry Leyden (Mtn. West)
- Halftime show: Amy Hanaialiʻi Gilliom and Hula Show
- Attendance: 30,467
- Payout: US$750,000 per team

United States TV coverage
- Network: ESPN
- Announcers: Terry Gannon (play-by-play); David Norrie (analyst); Vince Welch (sideline)

The 2007 Sheraton Hawaii Bowl was a post-season college football bowl game between the Boise State University Broncos from the Western Athletic Conference (WAC) and the East Carolina University Pirates from Conference USA (C-USA). This sixth edition of the Hawaii Bowl, sponsored by Sheraton Hotels and Resorts, was played at Aloha Stadium in Honolulu on December 23, 2007. The game was the final competition of the 2007 football season for each team and resulted in a 41–38 East Carolina victory, even though sportsbooks favored Boise State to win by 10 1/2 points. Many experts believed East Carolina to be big underdogs to Boise State, which had defeated the Oklahoma Sooners in the 2007 Fiesta Bowl. The 2007 Hawaiʻi Bowl paid $750,000 to each team's conference in exchange for their participation.

The game was expected to be an offensive shootout. Boise State averaged 42.4 points during the 2007 season, while East Carolina averaged 31. That expectation turned out to be justified as East Carolina took a 31–14 lead in the first half. The Broncos fought back in the second half, however, tying the score at 38 late in the fourth quarter after East Carolina's Chris Johnson fumbled the ball, allowing Bronco defender Marty Tadman to recover the ball and return it 47 yards for a touchdown. The game remained tied until the final moments as East Carolina's Ben Hartman made a 34–yard game-winning field goal as time expired. The attendance of 30,467 was the largest crowd to attend a Hawaiʻi Bowl game that did not feature the host school. Boise State's loss dropped them to a final 2007 record of 10–3, while East Carolina's final-game win earned them a record of 8–5.

== Selection process ==
The Hawaiʻi football team normally receives an automatic bid to the game unless the team is selected to participate in a BCS game or is not bowl eligible. If either of those events happen, the WAC selects its next-highest ranked team to compete in the game. In 2007, Hawaiʻi was selected to play on January 1, 2008, in the Sugar Bowl against Georgia, marking just the second time since the creation of the Hawaiʻi Bowl that Hawaiʻi would not participate. The only previous time that Hawaiʻi failed to make an appearance was in 2005, when the Warriors finished their season with a 5–7 record and were not eligible for a bowl game.

Conference USA fields the other team in the Hawaiʻi Bowl. The Liberty Bowl has the first selection of C-USA teams, and GMAC Bowl picks second. After those two are picked, the conference provides a team for the Hawaiʻi Bowl and three other bowls. In 2007, the University of Central Florida accepted the bid to compete in the Liberty Bowl, Tulsa accepted the bid to compete in the GMAC Bowl, leaving East Carolina to be selected by the Hawaiʻi Bowl on December 1, 2007.

Boise State was undefeated in conference play going into the final game of the regular season, and suffered just one out-of-conference loss. In that final game, BSU lost 39–27 to undefeated Hawaiʻi. Following the game, the Broncos decided to travel to Hawaiʻi, rather than play at home in the Humanitarian Bowl, which is located at Boise's home stadium in Boise, Idaho and features a matchup between a WAC team and one from the Atlantic Coast Conference. Boise ended its regular season 10–2 overall and 7–1 in conference play.

East Carolina, meanwhile, had been in first place in the C-USA's East Division with just two games remaining. A loss to Marshall University in that second-to-last game, however, put ECU into second place in its division, and thus out of competition for the Conference USA Championship. After winning against conference foe Tulane in the final game of the season, the Pirates decided to travel to the Hawaiʻi Bowl. East Carolina ended the regular season 7–5 overall, and 6–2 in conference play.

== Pre-game buildup ==
On December 1, 2007, Hawaiʻi Bowl representatives announced East Carolina and Boise State as the competitors in the 2007 edition of the game. It would be the first time in history that the two teams had ever met. Two weeks after the announcement, Boise State's top wide receiver Jeremy Childs, cornerback Keith McGowen, and linebacker Ben Chandler were declared out for the game after violating team rules. In an online contest held by ESPN.com in the weeks leading up to the game, 98% of the participants voted that Boise State would beat East Carolina. Participants also gave 32 out of 32 "confidence points" on average, indicating the highest possible confidence in the predicted outcome.

=== Boise State offense versus East Carolina defense ===
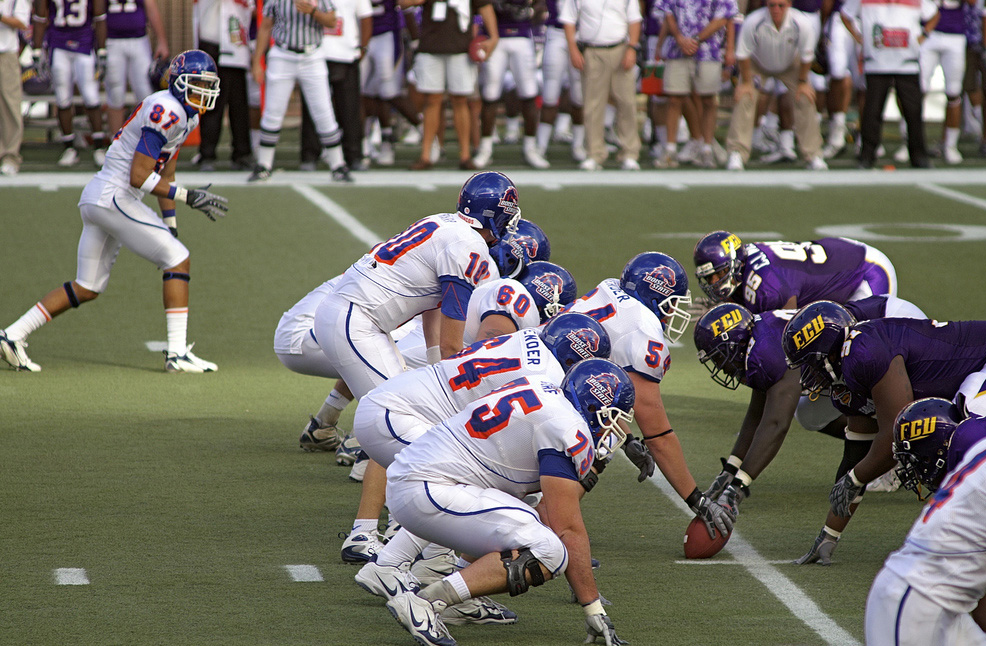
Boise State's offense begins a play against the East Carolina defense.

Boise State came into the game averaging 42.75 points and 475.67 yards per game, the fourth and twelfth highest totals in college football. Senior quarterback Taylor Tharp led the offense by more than 3,000 yards and 28 touchdowns, headed into the 2007 Hawaiiʻ Bowl. On the ground, the Broncos were led by junior running back Ian Johnson, who had 17 touchdowns and 1,030 yards in the regular season. Wide receiver Jeremy Childs also was a potent threat on offense, averaging 87.08 receiving yards per game, and backup running back D.J. Harper rushed for 41.44 yards per game on average. Johnson and Childs both earned First Team All-WAC honors, and Tharp was named to Second Team All-WAC. Offensive tackle Ryan Clady was the team's only All-American, and promised to do a good job protecting Taylor Tharp on the offensive line.

East Carolina had been shaky on defense. ECU ranked 98th in total defense and 115th in passing defense, giving up an average of 436.42 yards per game. Despite that fact, the Pirates did well in the turnover battle, gaining 27 turnovers while losing just 13–a margin of +14–good enough for ninth in the country. In addition, the ECU defense ranked eleventh nationally in tackles for loss. Defensive linemen Zack Slate and C.J. Wilson and defensive back Van Eskridge took C–USA All–Conference second team honors.

=== East Carolina offense versus Boise State defense ===
Boise State faced the nation's top all-purpose yards leader, All-American Chris Johnson. Johnson racked up an average of 212.67 all-purpose yards per game during the 2007 season, making him a potent threat on offense. Taking snaps for the offense were quarterbacks Patrick Pinkney and Rob Kass. Pinkney had a passer rating of 131.58, while Kass had a comparable rating of 122.94. The top receiver for the Pirates was Jamar Bryant, who averaged 3.5 catches for 52.17 yards per game. In addition to Chris Johnson, who was named to the C–USA All–Conference second team, offensive lineman Josh Coffman received C–USA All-Conference second team honors.

The Broncos' defense, meanwhile, was ranked number one in the WAC in total defense, scoring defense, rushing defense, and pass defense. The team's defense ranked number two in the conference in pass efficiency defense, turnover margin, and sacks. Defensive lineman Nick Schlekeway and defensive back Marty Tadman both received All–WAC first team honors and promised to pose difficulties for the Pirates' offensive front.

== Game summary ==
The 2007 Hawaiʻi Bowl kicked off on December 23, 2007, at 8:00 p.m EST in front of an estimated crowd of 30,467, which was the largest crowd in Hawaiʻi Bowl history for a game not featuring the Hawai'i football team. The game was nationally televised on ESPN, and was watched by an estimated average of 1.6 million people, good enough for a television rating of 1.47. East Carolina had to travel 4,861 miles (7,823 km) one way, making it the longest bowl trip of the season for any team during the 2007 bowl season. Boise State, meanwhile, traveled 2,835 miles (4,562 km) to Hawaiʻi. Due to the distance involved, East Carolina fans wishing to support their school, but unable to travel to the game, bought 2,709 tickets for troops stationed in Hawaiʻi as a show of support. The weather at kickoff was mostly cloudy with winds from the northeast at 13 miles (21 km). The temperature was 77 °F (25 °C). For the officiating crew, the referee was Terry Leyden, umpire was Kevin Matthews, and the linesman was Bob Bahne. The line judge was Bart Longson, the back judge was Joe Johnston and the field judge was Ed Vinzant. The side judge was Craig Falkner.

=== First quarter ===
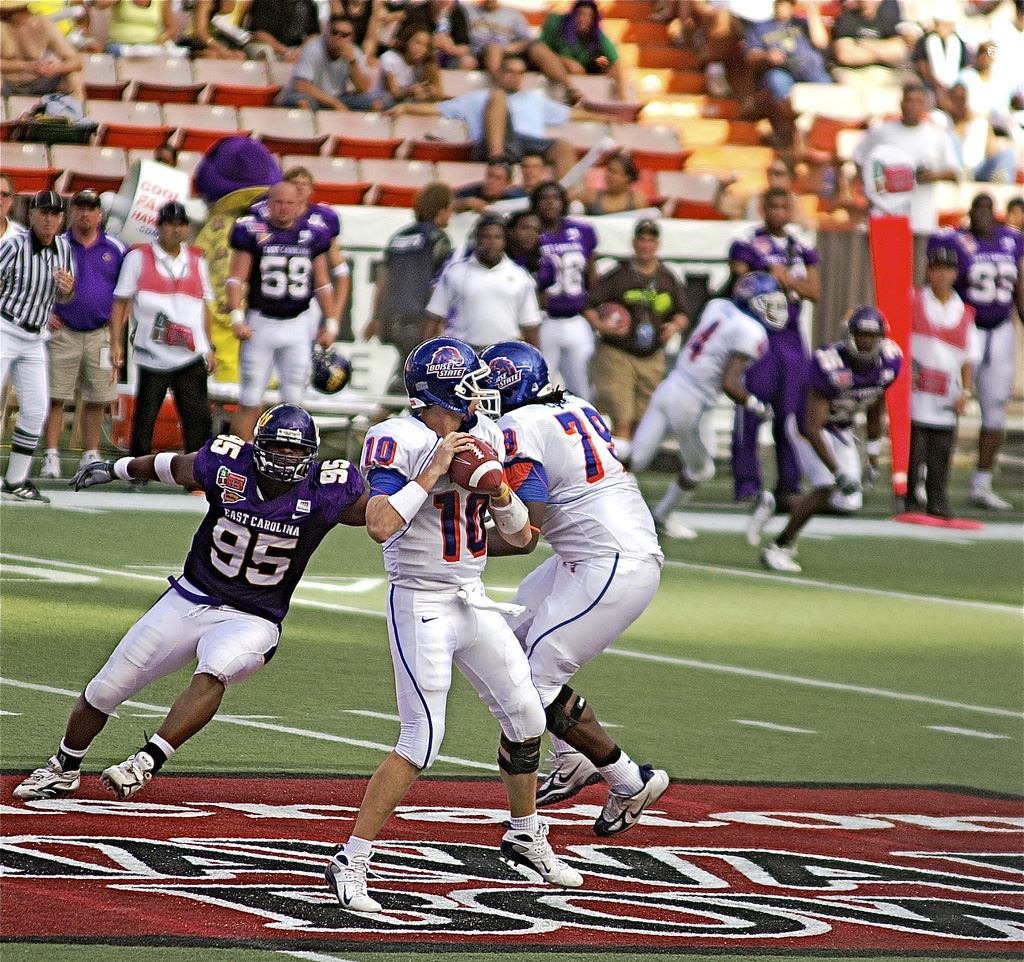
Boise State quarterback Taylor Tharp drops back before passing the ball.

East Carolina won the pre-game coin toss and deferred the ball until the second half, allowing Boise State to receive the ball to begin the game. The Broncos received the opening kickoff at their 4–yard line and went three-and-out. Following the Broncos' punt, East Carolina began its first possession of the game on its 43–yard line. The offense marched to the 19–yard line of Boise State, but was stopped on third down. ECU kicker Ben Hartman was sent into the game and made a field goal from 36 yards away.

East Carolina kicked the ball to Boise State's Austin Smith and he returned the kickoff 89 yards for a touchdown. The touchdown and extra point made the score 7–3 and gave Boise State its only lead of the game.

The next two drives for each team ended in punts. On East Carolina's third drive, Chris Johnson rushed on the first play 68 yards for a touchdown. With the point after, East Carolina lead 10–7. The next Boise State drive ended in a three and out, and the Broncos kicked the ball away. The Pirates marched down the field 55 yards, but the quarter ended before ECU had a chance to score.

At the end of the first quarter, East Carolina led Boise State 10–7.

=== Second quarter ===
ECU began the second quarter on Boise's 30–yard line, and quarterback Patrick Pinkney continued the Pirates' drive with a 14–yard rush. After three more successful plays, Dominique Lindsay rushed 3 yards for a touchdown. Kicker Ben Hartman converted the point after, which made the score 17–7 ECU.

The Broncos' first drive of the second quarter was halted after a holding penalty and an incomplete pass denied BSU a chance for a first down. Boise was forced to kick the ball away once more. The Pirates' second drive of the quarter began at their 26–yard line. ECU needed just four plays to march 74 yards down the field for a touchdown. On the drive, Chris Johnson rushed for 46 yards and threw an 18–yard pass for a touchdown. After the touchdown and the extra point kick, ECU led 24–7.

Boise State's first play after the post-touchdown kickoff was intercepted by Pirates' defender Travis Williams. Despite the turnover, East Carolina was unable to attain a first down, and went three-and-out before punting. On Boise's second play of the new drive following the punt, the team earned its first first down of the game. The Broncos continued the drive by going 69 yards in eight plays, culminating in a touchdown. The series included five complete passes and two rushes. With the score, The Broncos had closed the gap to ten points: 24–14 East Carolina.

East Carolina started their series on their 41–yard line. A substitution infraction on ECU and an incomplete pass forced ECU to punt the ball away. On the Broncos' fourth drive of the second quarter, the team began with three complete passes for 18 yards. On the fourth play, however, BSU's Titus Young fumbled the ball away. Pirates' defender Jay Ross recovered the fumble, and ECU had another chance on offense before the end of the first half. East Carolina ran five plays for 38 yards. With the clock running down, ECU elected to kick a field goal. The kick was good, and made the score 31–14 ECU. Boise State had one final chance on offense, and Boise Quarterback Taylor Tharp went two-for-four, but ran out of time before coming into field goal range.

At halftime, East Carolina led Boise State 31–14.

=== Third quarter ===
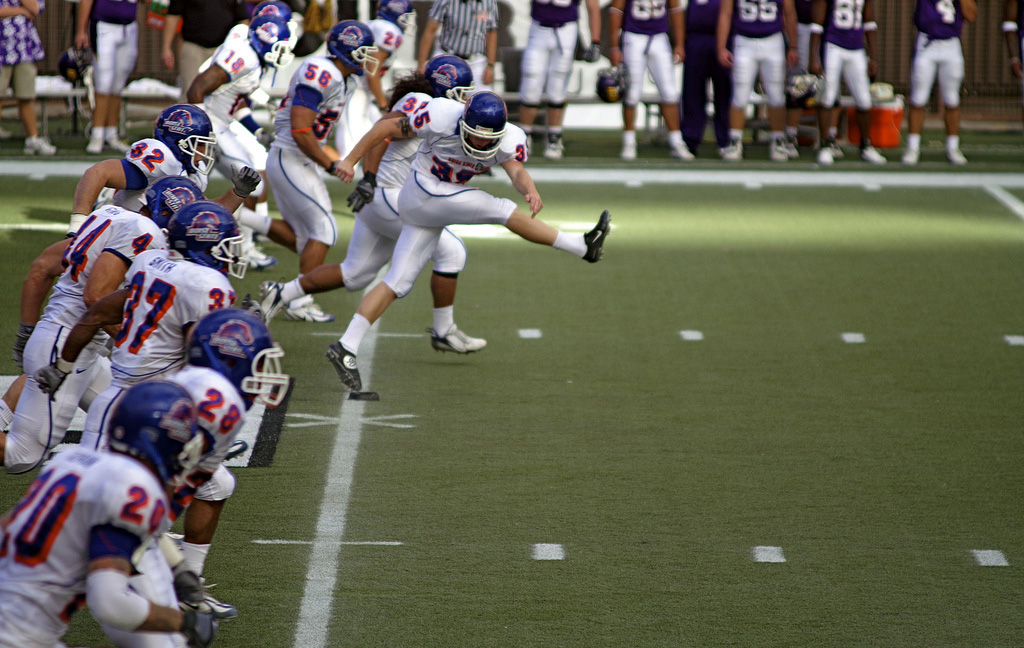
Boise State begins the second half by kicking off the ball.

Because Boise State had received the opening kickoff, East Carolina received the ball to open the second half. ECU completed seven rushes and four passes for 74 yards in five minutes and 53 seconds. On the last play of the drive, Brandon Simmons rushed three yards for a touchdown, and ECU increased its lead to 38–14.

To begin its first series of the second half, Boise State returned the post-touchdown kickoff 55 yards. Two quick plays later, Boise quarterback Taylor Tharp completed a pass to Jeremy Avery for a touchdown, cutting East Carolina's lead to 17 points, 38–21.

After the punt, the Pirates were unable to obtain a first down. Three plays netted only two yards, and ECU was forced to punt the ball away. On the ensuing drive, Boise State completed three first downs on the series. BSU kicker Kyle Brotzman, converted a 31-yard field goal and the Broncos shrank the ECU lead further. The series went 40 yards in nine plays. It took the team two minutes and 37 seconds to score.

East Carolina took the kickoff on the 39–yard line, after a Boise player illegally touched the ball on the 39. Pinkney threw an incomplete pass to start the drive, and after two more plays failed to convert the first down, ECU was forced to punt the ball away. After a touchback, Boise State began at its 20–yard line. The Broncos completed three plays for 11 yards before the third quarter ended.

At the end of the third quarter, East Carolina led Boise State 38–24.

=== Fourth quarter ===
BSU started the fourth quarter by throwing two incomplete passes. Tharp then completed two passes for a combined 39 yards before Pirates' defender J.J. Milbrook intercepted Tharp's fifth pass of the quarter. Milbrook returned the interception 27 yards. The Pirates completed one first down but failed to convert the interception into points. Kicker Matt Dodge came into the game, ostensibly to punt the ball away. In a trick play, he rushed the ball instead, picking up the first down. Despite the trick play's success, the Pirates were not able to gain another first down. On fourth down, Dodge came out again, and this time punted the ball 47 yards for a touchback. The Broncos began the second drive of the fourth quarter by going 80 yards in nine plays for a touchdown. It took just three minutes and 59 seconds and BSU only three first downs. Boise had now cut the Pirates' lead to 38–31.

On the next drive, ECU brought in a new quarterback, Rob Kass. Kass was initially successful, and gained a few first downs. The Boise State defense stiffened, however, and ECU was forced to punt the ball away. After a touchback, Boise State began on its 20–yard line. Running back Jeremy Avery rushed for four yards on the first play. On the third play, Tharp completed a pass for nine yards for a first down. Tharp then passed three straight times for 32 yards and two first downs. On subsequent plays, Tharp rushed for six yards and passed for another six to convert BSU's third first down of the drive. Three plays later, however, the Broncos' Titus Young fumbled the ball for the second time in the game, and as before, ECU recovered, seemingly sealing the victory.

ECU Kicker Ben Hartman kicks the game-winning field goal.

After a Boise State unsportsmanlike conduct penalty, ECU began at their 39–yard line, needing only to rush the ball to keep the clock moving in order to secure the win. On the second rush by Chris Johnson, however, he fumbled the ball. The fumble was recovered by Broncos' defender Marty Tadman at the ECU 47–yard line and returned all the way for a touchdown. After the PAT, Boise State tied East Carolina 38–38. The fumble and touchdown turned what had been an inevitable ECU victory into a tie game.

Boise kicked the ball deep, hoping to stop the Pirates' offense and force overtime. Following the kick, ECU began at its own nine–yard line. The Pirates began the drive with one minute and 16 seconds left in the game. Dominique Lindsay rushed for two yards before Rob Kass completed a pass to Jamar Bryant for 39 yards, enough for a first down near midfield. The Pirates' continued to move forward, passing for short yardage and rushing for short gains that kept the clock moving, but advanced the ball closer to field goal range. On the third to the last play, Kass rushed for seven yards, and ECU took a timeout with 15 seconds left. Rob Kass lost one yard while moving the ball towards the center of the field in order to set up a game-ending kick. ECU took its last timeout, again stopping the clock. With four seconds remaining on the clock, ECU kicker Ben Hartman converted a 34–yard field goal to take the lead and the win, 41–38, as time ran out.

Scoring summary

Quarter	Time	Drive			Team	Scoring information	Score	
Quarter	Time	Plays	Yards	TOP	Team	Scoring information	BSU	ECU
1	08:22		38	4:22	ECU	36-yard field goal by Ben Hartman	0	3
1	08:10		89	0:00	BSU	Austin Smith 89-yard touchdown kickoff return, Kyle Brotzman kick good	7	3
1	04:25		68	0:11	ECU	Chris Johnson 68-yard touchdown run, Ben Hartman kick good	7	10
2	12:31		85	4:25	ECU	Dominique Lindsay 3-yard touchdown run, Ben Hartman kick good	7	17
2	08:51		74	1:26	ECU	Chris Johnson 18-yard touchdown reception from Patrick Pinkney, Ben Hartman kick good	7	24
2	04:18		69	2:17	BSU	Ryan Putnam 3-yard touchdown reception from Taylor Tharp, Kyle Brotzman kick good	14	24
2	00:33		38	1:48	ECU	Dominique Lindsay 3-yard touchdown run, Ben Hartman kick good	14	31
3	09:02		74	5:58	ECU	Brandon Simmons 3-yard touchdown run, Ben Hartman kick good	14	38
3	08:10		33	0:52	BSU	Jeremy Avery 25-yard touchdown reception from Taylor Tharp, Kyle Brotzman kick good	21	38
3	03:11		40	2:38	BSU	31-yard field goal by Kyle Brotzman	24	38
4	07:09		80	3:59	BSU	D.J. Harper 1-yard touchdown run, Kyle Brotzman kick good	31	38
4	01:25		47	0:00	BSU	Fumble recovery returned 47 yards for touchdown by Marty Tadman, Kyle Brotzman kick good	38	38
4	00:00		44	1:25	ECU	34-yard field goal by Ben Hartman	38	41
"TOP" = time of possession. For other American football terms, see Glossary of American football.							41	38

== Final statistics ==
Statistical comparison
	ECU	BSU
1st downs	22	22
Total yards	476	368
Passing yards	154	270
Rushing yards	322	98
Penalties	7–50	4–50
3rd down conversions	6–15	6–12
4th down conversions	1–1	0–0
Turnovers	1	4
Time of Possession	33:44	26:16

East Carolina running back Chris Johnson finished the game with 223 rushing yards, 32 receiving yards, and 153 return yards for a total of 408 all-purpose yards. That mark broke the NCAA bowl record for all-purpose yards previously set by Alabama's Sherman Williams against Ohio State in the 1995 Citrus Bowl. On the basis of his record-setting performance, Johnson was named the game's Most Valuable Player. On the opposite side of the ball, Boise State tailback Jeremy Avery had a solid, if unspectacular, outing. He produced 69 rushing yards, 43 receiving yards, 41 kick–return yards, and caught a 25–yard touchdown pass. Both Johnson and Avery received the Most Valuable Player award for their respective teams.

Boise State committed four turnovers, compared with East Carolina's one. The Broncos fumbled the ball away twice and threw two interceptions. Despite the disparity in turnover margin, the teams were strikingly similar in several statistical categories, indicating the closeness of the game: Each team earned seven points off the turnovers. Both teams committed 50 yards in penalties; the Pirates had seven penalties to the Broncos' four. In addition, both teams earned 22 first downs.

=== Boise State statistical recap ===
Individual leaders
Boise State Passing
	C/ATT^{*}	Yds	TD	INT
Taylor Tharp	30/44	270	2	2
Boise State Rushing
	Car^{a}	Yds	TD	LG^{b}
Jeremy Avery	10	69	0	23
Taylor Tharp	6	7	0	9
Ian Johnson	4	11	0	11
Boise State Receiving
	Rec^{c}	Yds	TD	LG^{b}
Austin Pettis	9	89	0	29
Titus Young	7	47	0	10
Julian Hawkins	5	35	0	9
Jeremy Avery	4	43	1	25

^{*} Completions/Attempts ^{a} Carries ^{b} Long play ^{c} Receptions

Boise State University had 368 total offensive yards during the game. About 73% of BSU's total offense came through the air, as quarterback Taylor Tharp passed for 270 yards. The remaining 98 yards came on the ground from five different rushers. Running back Jeremy Avery ran for a team-high 69 yards on 10 carries, while running back D.J. Harper had the only Boise State rushing touchdown of the game.

Tharp's 30 completions were caught by eight different receivers. Austin Pettis led the team with nine catches for 89 yards, and his total accounted for one–third of the team's receiving yards. Two receivers, Jeremy Avery and Ryan Putnam, accounted for all of the team's receiving touchdowns. Avery had four catches for 43 yards, while Putnam had one catch for three yards.

Taylor Tharp's two interceptions were the second-most he had thrown in a game during 2007, and brought his season interception total to 11. He completed 30 of 44 pass attempts, a completion percentage of 68.2%. His 270 yards were 13 yards more than his season average of 257 yards. With only two passing touchdowns, Tharp tied for his third-worst passing game in 2007, faring worse only in the win against Weber State, loss to Washington, win against Fresno State, and loss to Hawaiʻi. Tharp was sacked once by Pirates' defensive lineman C.J. Wilson for a seven-yard loss.

Boise State's defense had a hard time stopping the East Carolina offense, especially in the first half. The Pirates' 31 points were the most scored all year by East Carolina in the first half. Leading the Broncos' defense was safety Marty Tadman. Tadman had seven solo tackles, three assisted tackles, and recorded a defensive touchdown after recovering Chris Johnson's fumble late in the fourth quarter. Linebacker Kyle Gingg also starred on defense, recording seven solo tackles, one assisted tackle, and one tackle for a one-yard loss. A total of 23 players recorded at least one tackle.

Kyle Brotzman handled all the kicking duties for Boise State, punting the ball four times for 169 yards. His longest punt was 52 yards, and one kick was downed inside the Pirates' 20 yard line. His only field goal was a 31–yard kick that came with three minutes and 11 seconds left in the third quarter. Brotzman kicked off seven times for 384 yards, averaging 54.9 yards per kick with no touchbacks. Marty Tadman had BSU's only punt return for −1 yard. The Broncos' special teams had more luck on kickoff returns. Three players had kickoff returns. Austin Smith returned four kickoffs for 173 yards. His 89–yard return for a touchdown in the first quarter was the team's longest of the game and gave Boise State its only lead of the game. Jeremy Avery returned two kicks for 41 yards, and Titus Young returned one kick for 52 yards.

Boise State controlled the time of possession only during the fourth quarter, when the Broncos scored 14 points to tie the game. Overall, however, Boise State only controlled the ball for 26 minutes and 16 seconds, in comparison to East Carolina's 33 minutes and 44 seconds.

=== East Carolina statistical recap ===
Individual leaders
East Carolina Passing
	C/ATT^{*}	Yds	TD	INT
Patrick Pinkney	12/19	118	1	0
Rob Kass	1/3	36	0	0
East Carolina Rushing
	Car^{a}	Yds	TD	LG^{b}
Chris Johnson	28	223	1	68
Patrick Pinkney	11	53	0	21
Dwayne Harris	3	24	0	11
East Carolina Receiving
	Rec^{c}	Yds	TD	LG^{b}
Jamar Bryant	6	78	0	36
Chris Johnson	3	32	1	18
Dwayne Harris	1	22	0	22
Jay Sonnhalter	1	16	0	16

^{*} Completions/Attempts ^{a} Carries ^{b} Long play ^{c} Receptions

Almost 70% of the Pirates' rushing offense came from running back Chris Johnson, and the rushing offense itself consisted of two–thirds of East Carolina's total offensive effort. Six additional rushers contributed 99 yards on the ground. The longest rush of the game–68 yards–came from Johnson. Quarterback Patrick Pinkney played much of the game, completing 12 passes in 19 attempts. Pinkney threw for 118 yards and one touchdown, but the longest pass came from the Pirates' second quarterback, Rob Kass. Kass threw a 36–yard pass in the fourth quarter to keep the Pirates' game-winning drive alive. The pass was Kass's only completion out of three attempts. Almost one–third of East Carolina's total offense came from the air.

Ben Hartman and Matt Dodge both contributed to East Carolina's kicking game. Dodge punted the ball seven times for 302 yards. His longest was a 61–yard kick, and he had four touchbacks. Hartman and Dodge shared kickoff duty. Dodge had four kickoffs, compared with Hartman's three. Dodge averaged 60.5 yards per kick, while Hartman averaged 57 yards. In addition, Hartman added six points to the scoreboard from field goal attempts. He was two for two, with the second field goal attempt being the game-winner in the fourth quarter. Dwayne Harris handled all punt returns. He fielded two punts, returning them for a total of five yards. Kickoff-return duty was handled by Chris Johnson. He returned six kickoffs for 153 yards, with his longest return consisting of 39 yards.

East Carolina's defense managed a strong performance statistically and in real terms. The most obvious examples of this were the two interceptions and two forced fumbles. On the first play of the second drive of the second quarter, Boise State quarterback Taylor Tharp threw an interception to defensive back Travis Williams. Williams also recorded eight solo tackles—the second-highest total for the Pirates–and a forced fumble. The other interception came from defensive back J.J. Milbrook, who also boasted three solo tackles, tying him for fifth–best on the team. Linebacker Jeremy forced the final Broncos turnover, gaining the ball and four yards on the play. In addition to his forced fumble, Chambliss recorded four solo tackles. The Pirates' defense as a whole only gave up three yards in the first quarter and did not allow a first down until halfway through the second quarter.

That strong defensive effort limited the Broncos' third–down conversion rate to 50%. Until the fourth quarter, BSU was just two for seven on third–down attempts. On offense, the Pirates fared slightly better, going six for fifteen on third downs.

== After-effects ==
The win by East Carolina knocked #24 Boise State out of the final AP Poll of the year. This was the first time BSU was not ranked in the AP Poll top 25 since October 28, 2007. Because of his impressive performance, Chris Johnson was invited to the 2008 Senior Bowl. After the game, East Carolina finished the season 8–5, the highest win total since 2000. This also marked Coach Skip Holtz's first Bowl win. Boise State finished the season 10–3. This marked Coach Chris Petersen first post-season loss.

== See also ==
- Glossary of American football
- 2007 NCAA Division I FBS football rankings
