= Jeremy Childs =

American football player (born 1987)

Profile
- Position: Wide receiver

Personal information
- Born: June 29, 1987 (age 39); Los Alamitos, California, U.S.
- Listed height: 6 ft 0 in (1.83 m)
- Listed weight: 184 lb (83 kg)

Career information
- High school: Los Alamitos (CA)
- College: Boise State
- NFL draft: 2009: undrafted

Career history
- San Diego Chargers (2009)*
- * Offseason or practice squad member only

Jeremy Childs (born June 29, 1987) is an American former football wide receiver. He was signed by the San Diego Chargers as an undrafted free agent in 2009. He played college football at Boise State.

== Early life ==
Coached by John Barnes, he played high school football at Los Alamitos High School. He helped lead team to a 12–2 record and a runner-up finish in the CIF Division I playoffs. Childs was named first-team all-state, first-team all-county, first-team Long Beach Dream Team, L.A. Times, and All-Sunset League; offensive player of the year; All-CIF; a CBS SportsLine All-American; and to second-team EA Sports All-National team . He caught 85 passes for 1,258 yards and 22 touchdowns. Childs was a member of Honor Roll and named scholar-athlete.

== College career ==
Childs is a two-time first-team All-WAC selection, he elected to follow the lead of his cousin, former Broncos cornerback Orlando Scandrick, in leaving after his junior season for the opportunity of NFL riches. Childs leaves Boise State second all-time in receptions (168), though his 1,999 yards rank only 11th in school history. That also represents scouts' greatest concern about Childs; a lack of speed and elusiveness to make yardage after the catch. Like Scandrick, Childs could surprise in workouts, leading to a late push up the board. Had an arm span of 33 3/4 inches and a hand span of 9 inches at the combine. He was suspended for the 2007 Hawaii Bowl and again for the 2008 season opener (against Idaho State)

== Professional career ==
2009 NFL Combine Results: 40 Yard Dash : 4.69 seconds Vertical Jump : 33.5 inches Broad Jump : 115.0 inches 3 Cone Drill : 6.9 seconds 20 Yard Shuttle : 4.26 seconds 60 Yard Shuttle : 11.29 seconds

Childs signed a free agent contract with the National Football League San Diego Chargers. On June 23, 2009, he was cut from the Chargers.
