= Grant Hedrick =

American gridiron football player and coach (born 1991)

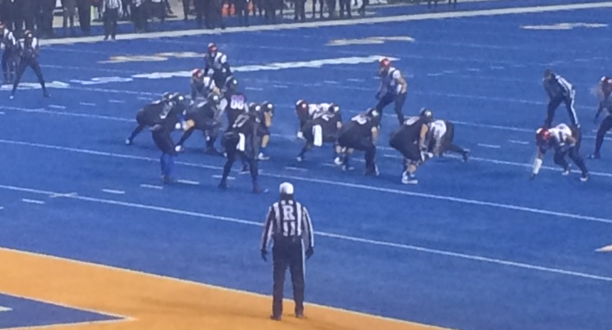

No. 9
- Position: Quarterback

Personal information
- Born: October 26, 1991 (age 35)
- Listed weight: 198 lb (90 kg)

Career information
- High school: Central (Independence, Oregon)
- College: Boise State
- NFL draft: 2015: undrafted

Career history

Playing
- BC Lions (2015)*
- * Offseason or practice squad member only

Coaching
- Central High School (2015) Offensive coordinator; Oregon City High School (2021–2023) Offensive coordinator

Awards and highlights
- Second-team All-MWC (2014)

Grant Joseph Hedrick (born October 26, 1991) is an American former football player. He played quarterback at Boise State University from 2010 to 2014 where he helped them win the 2014 Fiesta Bowl (December) and graduated with a bachelor's degree in criminal justice. Hedrick had a brief stint with the BC Lions of the Canadian Football League (CFL) in 2015. Prior to his collegiate and professional football career, Hedrick attended Central High School (Independence, Oregon) where he was an all-state football, basketball, and track athlete.

== College career ==
=== 2010–2013 ===
Hedrick redshirted for the 2010 season at Boise State before playing sparingly as a back-up from 2011 to 2012. His first significant playing time came against Nevada on October 19, 2013, after quarterback Joe Southwick injured his ankle on the first play from scrimmage. Hedrick passed for 150 yards and rushed for 115 yards and two touchdowns in that game. Hedrick finished the 2013 season with 1,825 passing yards and 16 touchdowns, in addition to 277 yards rushing for six touchdowns. Hedrick ranked 5th in the country for completion percentage (69%).

=== 2014 ===
During Hedrick's senior season he started all 14 games for Boise State. He was named 2nd Team All-Mountain West Conference after passing for 3,696 yards and 23 touchdowns. He also rushed for 562 yards and 8 touchdowns. Hedrick led the nation in completion percentage (70.8%), was 7th in yards per pass attempt (8.91), 9th in pass efficiency (157.20), 13th in passing yards, and 14th in total offense (306.3 yards per game).

== Professional career ==
After going unselected in the 2015 NFL draft, Hedrick had tryouts with the Denver Broncos, but did not sign. He was later signed by the BC Lions of the Canadian Football League (CFL), but was released shortly afterwards.

== Coaching career ==
In 2015, Hedrick served as the offensive coordinator for Central High School (Independence, Oregon) for one season, helping the team reach the OSAA 5A quarterfinals. Hedrick also pursued a career in law enforcement from 2015 to 2021 at the Independence Police Department in Independence, Oregon. In August 2021, Hedrick accepted a teaching position at Oregon City High School where he is also the offensive coordinator for the varsity football team.
