= Brock Forsey =

American football player (born 1980)

No. 44, 43
- Position: Running back

Personal information
- Born: February 11, 1980 (age 46); Meridian, Idaho, U.S.
- Listed height: 5 ft 11 in (1.80 m)
- Listed weight: 203 lb (92 kg)

Career information
- High school: Centennial (Boise, Idaho)
- College: Boise State
- NFL draft: 2003: 6th round, 206th overall pick

Career history
- Chicago Bears (2003); Miami Dolphins (2004); Washington Redskins (2005)*
- * Offseason or practice squad member only

Awards and highlights
- WAC Offensive Player of the Year (2002)

Career NFL statistics
- Rushing attempts: 69
- Rushing yards: 244
- Rushing touchdowns: 2
- Receptions: 3
- Receiving yards: 37
- Stats at Pro Football Reference

Brock L. Forsey (born February 11, 1980) is an American former professional football player who was a running back in the National Football League (NFL). He was selected by the Chicago Bears in the sixth round of the 2003 NFL draft. He played college football for the Boise State Broncos.

== Early life ==
He played high school football at Centennial High School in Boise, Idaho.

== College career ==
With the Boise State Broncos, Forsey became only the third player ever to record more than 30 touchdowns (six receiving and 26 rushing) in one season, joining Troy Edwards and Barry Sanders.

== Professional career ==
=== Chicago Bears ===
Forsey was selected by the Chicago Bears in the sixth round (206th overall) in the 2003 NFL draft. He saw his first significant playing time as a rookie on October 26, 2003, rushing for 56 yards and a touchdown against the Detroit Lions. Forsey experienced his best game as a pro on November 30 against the Arizona Cardinals, filling in for starter Anthony Thomas, who had viral pneumonia. Against Arizona, Forsey carried the ball 27 times for 134 yards (5.0 average) and a touchdown. He also caught two passes for 27 yards as the Bears went on to win 28–3.

Forsey finished his rookie season with 11 games played (two starts), 191 rushing yards and two touchdowns. He caught three passes for 37 yards, and did not fumble in 53 touches.

With the Bears during the 2004 preseason, Forsey had 27 carries for 97 yards and a touchdown. He added three receptions for 16 yards. Nevertheless, Forsey was released at the conclusion of the preseason, unable to earn a spot in a crowded backfield that included Thomas Jones, Anthony Thomas and Adrian Peterson.

=== Miami Dolphins ===
On September 22, 2004, Forsey worked out for the Miami Dolphins. He signed with the team a week later after running back Lamar Gordon was placed on injured reserve. Forsey first appeared with the Dolphins on October 10 against the New England Patriots, rushing 13 times for 44 yards.

Forsey was briefly waived by the Dolphins on December 4, but re-signed three days later when running back Leonard Henry was released. He was inactive for the remaining games of the season. He finished the year with 19 carries for 53 yards and a fumble in six games.

On April 29, 2005, Forsey was released by the Dolphins.

=== Washington Redskins ===
On May 5, 2005, Forsey signed a one-year, $380,000 deal with the Washington Redskins. With Clinton Portis, Ladell Betts, Rock Cartwright and others ahead of him on the depth chart, Forsey was given just one carry in the preseason and gained no yards.

He was released by the team on August 29 - before the team's final preseason game. It was the last time he was a member of an NFL team.

== See also ==
- List of NCAA Division I FBS running backs with at least 50 career rushing touchdowns
- List of NCAA major college football yearly scoring leaders
