= Taylor Tharp =

American football player, coach, and administrator (born 1984)

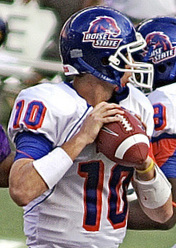
- Tharp in the 2007 Hawaii Bowl

Personal information
- Born: September 20, 1984 (age 42); Boulder, Colorado, U.S.
- Listed height: 6 ft 1 in (1.85 m)
- Listed weight: 206 lb (93 kg)

Career information
- College: Boise State
- NFL draft: 2008: undrafted

Career history

Playing
- Carolina Panthers (2008)*; Boise Burn (2009); Utah Blaze (2010); Parma Panthers (2011–2012)
- * Offseason or practice squad member only

Coaching
- Parma Panthers (2011–2012) Quarterbacks coach; Texas (2012–2013) Graduate assistant

Operations
- Boise State (2014–present) Director of player personnel

Awards and highlights
- Second-team All-WAC (2007); (2011) Italian Football League Champion; (2012) Italian Football League Champion

Career AFL statistics
- Comp. / Att.: 7 / 16
- Passing yards: 83
- TD–INT: 2–0
- QB rating: 91.41
- Rushing touchdowns: 1
- Stats at ArenaFan.com

Taylor Tharp (born September 20, 1984) is an American former football quarterback for the Carolina Panthers of the National Football League (NFL). He signed with the Carolina Panthers as an undrafted free agent following the 2008 NFL draft. Tharp also played Arena football and in Italian Football League (IFL). He played college football at Boise State. He is known for designing the Statue of Liberty play, which gave Boise State the win in overtime of the 2007 Fiesta Bowl.

== College ==
As the Broncos' starting quarterback in 2007, Tharp finished his senior season ranked seventh-nationally in passing efficiency (152.85) en route to second-team All-Western Athletic Conference honors, completing 289-of-423 passes for 3,340 yards and 30 touchdowns. At the time, his completion total was Boise State's single-season record.

== Professional career ==
Pre-draft measurables
Height	Weight	40-yard dash	10-yard split	20-yard split
6 ft 1 1/8 in (1.86 m)	206 lb (93 kg)	5.00 s	1.72 s	2.89 s
All values from Pro Day

Upon graduating from Boise State with a degree in communications in 2007, Tharp signed a free agent contract with the Carolina Panthers of the National Football League.

Tharp then played two years in the Arena Football League - starting at quarterback for the Boise Burn in 2009 and for the Utah Blaze in 2010.

Tharp went on to serve as an offensive intern coach for the Arizona Rattlers of the AFL in 2010.

Tharp played two seasons 2011-2012 for the Parma Panthers of the Italian Football League. He served as the team's quarterback and quarterbacks coach, leading the Panthers to two IFL championships.

=== Coaching ===
In 2012–2013, Tharp was a graduate assistant coach at Longhorns, Tharp broke down game film, compiled scouting reports, coached the defensive scout team and assisted with offensive game plans. Tharp also served as Texas' summer football camps coordinator.

Taylor Tharp is currently the Director of Player Personnel at Boise State University, a position which he has held since 2014.
