= Matt Miller (wide receiver) =

American football player and coach (born 1991)

Current position
- Title: Offensive coordinator
- Team: Washington State
- Conference: Pac-12

Biographical details
- Born: May 1, 1991 (age 35); Helena, Montana, U.S.

Playing career
- 2010–2014: Boise State
- Position: Wide receiver

Coaching career (HC unless noted)
- 2015: Boise State (OQC)
- 2016: Montana State (WR)
- 2017–2018: Montana State (WR/RC)
- 2018–2019: Montana State (OC/QB)
- 2020: Boise State (PGC/WR)
- 2021–2024: Boise State (WR)
- 2025: Boise State (co-OC/WR)
- 2026–present: Washington State (OC/QB)

Matt Miller (born May 1, 1991) is an American football coach who is currently the offensive coordinator at Washington State University. He was previously assistant coach at Montana State University from 2016 to 2019 and at Boise State University from 2020 to 2025.

== Early life and playing career ==
A native of Helena, Montana, Miller was a three-sport star at Capital High School. His athleticism caught the attention of then-Arkansas head coach Bobby Petrino, a Capital High alumni and former teammate of Miller's father. A highly touted recruit, he received offers to play college football from schools such as Oregon, Oregon State, and Boise State and also received offers to play college basketball at Montana and Montana State. He committed to playing college football at Boise State on Christmas Day in 2009.

At Boise State, Miller redshirted the 2010 season after tearing an Achilles tendon in fall camp. As a redshirt freshman, Miller set single season freshman records for the program including receptions (62), receiving yards (679), and receiving touchdowns (9) en route to freshman All-America honors in 2011. By the time his college career ended in 2014, Miller was Boise State's career leader in receptions and second all-time in receiving yards.

Pre-draft measurables
Height	Weight	Arm length	Hand span	40-yard dash	10-yard split	20-yard split	20-yard shuttle	Three-cone drill	Vertical jump	Broad jump	Bench press
6 ft 2 7/8 in (1.90 m)	220 lb (100 kg)	32 1/2 in (0.83 m)	8 7/8 in (0.23 m)	4.78 s	1.66 s	2.73 s	4.43 s	7.12 s	34.0 in (0.86 m)	9 ft 6 in (2.90 m)	9 reps
All values from Pro Day

Miller had a professional tryout with the Denver Broncos before injuries ended his playing career.

== Coaching career ==
After his playing career ended, Miller spent 2015 at Boise State as an offensive quality control coach. He was hired as the receivers coach at Montana State in 2016 and added the title of recruiting coordinator in 2017. Midway through the 2018 season, he was promoted to offensive coordinator and quarterbacks coach, and held that role for the 2019 season as well.

Miller returned to his alma mater Boise State in 2020 as their wide receivers coach and passing game coordinator.

== Personal life ==
Miller is married to the former Sarah Baugh, a former standout volleyball player at Boise State.
