= 1969 Boise State Broncos football team =

American college football season

1969 Boise State Broncos football
- Conference: Independent
- Record: 9–1
- Head coach: Tony Knap (2nd season)
- Home stadium: Bronco Stadium

1969 NAIA independents football records
	Conf.			Overall
Team	W	L	T	W		L		T
No. 14/NR Boise State		–		9	–	1	–	0
No. 8/NR Western Carolina		–		9	–	1	–	0
Cal Lutheran		–		8	–	1	–	0
No. 2/6 New Mexico Highlands ^		–		8	–	1	–	1
No. 5/NR Hillsdale ^		–		9	–	2	–	0
Wofford		–		9	–	2	–	0
No. 15/9 Tampa		–		8	–	2	–	0
Austin		–		7	–	2	–	0
Westminster (PA)		–		6	–	2	–	0
Georgetown (KY)		–		6	–	3	–	0
Carson–Newman		–		6	–	3	–	1
Iowa Wesleyan		–		5	–	3	–	0
La Verne		–		5	–	4	–	0
Waynesburg		–		5	–	4	–	0
Appalachian State		–		6	–	5	–	0
Oklahoma Panhandle State		–		6	–	5	–	0
Grove City		–		3	–	4	–	1
Southwest State (MN)		–		3	–	6	–	0
Emory and Henry		–		2	–	7	–	0
Missouri Southern		–		2	–	8	–	0
Geneva		–		1	–	6	–	1
Simon Fraser		–		1	–	6	–	1
Azusa Pacific		–		1	–	7	–	0
Eastern New Mexico *		–		1	–	9	–	0
Kentucky State		–		0	–	8	–	0
^ – NAIA playoff participant; * Eastern New Mexico forfeits win over Adams State and Central State (OK).; Rankings from NAIA poll and AP small college poll

The 1969 Boise State Broncos football team represented Boise State College during the 1969 NAIA football season, the second season of Bronco football at the four-year level. It was Boise's final season as an NAIA independent before joining the Big Sky Conference and NCAA in 1970.

The Broncos played their home games on campus at the original Bronco Stadium in Boise, Idaho. This was the final year for this wooden iteration, constructed in 1950, and the Broncos' last season for home games on natural grass. Immediately following the end of the season, the venue was razed and a new concrete stadium was built in less than ten months for the start of the 1970 season, outfitted with AstroTurf (green for sixteen seasons, until 1986).

Led by second-year head coach Tony Knap, the Broncos finished with a 9–1 record.

== Schedule ==
Date	Time	Opponent	Site	Result	Attendance	Source
September 20	1:30 pm	vs. Central Washington	Apple Bowl; Wenatchee, WA	W 37–7	3,500	
September 27	8:00 pm	Whitworth	Bronco Stadium; Boise, ID	W 66–7	8,250	
October 4	7:30 pm	at Cal Poly	Mustang Stadium; San Luis Obispo, CA	W 17–7	7,000	
October 11	1:30 pm	Colorado State–Greeley^{†}	Bronco Stadium; Boise, ID	L 10–16	8,700	
October 18	2:00 pm	at Eastern Washington	Woodward Field; Cheney, WA	W 45–7		
October 25	1:30 pm	at Southern Oregon	Fuller Field; Ashland, OR	W 62–0		
November 1	1:30 pm	Hiram Scott	Bronco Stadium; Boise, ID	W 51–7	6,500	
November 8	1:30 pm	at Western State (CO)	Mountaineer Bowl; Gunnison, CO	W 23–20		
November 15	1:30 pm	Idaho State	Bronco Stadium; Boise, ID	W 35–27	11,600	
November 22	1:30 pm	College of Idaho	Bronco Stadium; Boise, ID	W 45–0		
^{†}Homecoming; All times are in Mountain time

== NFL draft ==
One Bronco was selected in the 1970 NFL draft, which lasted 17 rounds (442 selections).

Player	Position	Round	Overall	Franchise
Steve Svitak	Linebacker	7th	180	Oakland Raiders
