= Thomas Sperbeck =

American football player (born 1994)

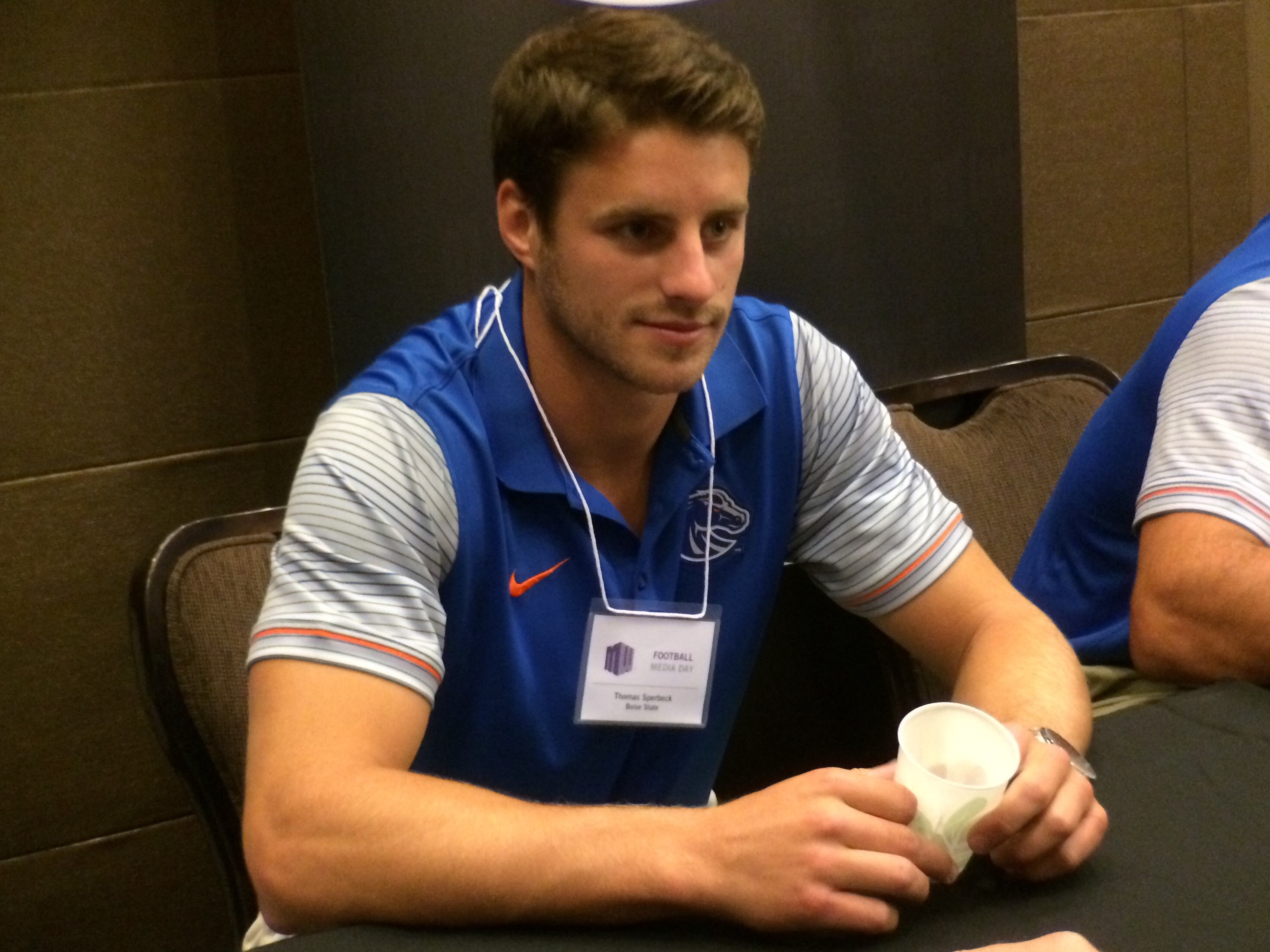
- Sperbeck at 2016 Mountain West Media Days

Profile
- Position: Wide receiver

Personal information
- Born: October 21, 1994 (age 32); Carmichael, California, U.S.
- Listed height: 6 ft 0 in (1.83 m)
- Listed weight: 175 lb (79 kg)

Career information
- High school: Jesuit (Carmichael, California)
- College: Boise State
- NFL draft: 2017: undrafted

Career history
- Tampa Bay Buccaneers (2017)*
- * Offseason or practice squad member only

Awards and highlights
- 2× First-team All-MWC (2015, 2016); Fiesta Bowl Offensive MVP (2014)

Thomas Sperbeck (born October 21, 1994) is an American football wide receiver. He played college football for the Boise State Broncos. He is the all-time leader in receiving yards in Boise State history.

== Early life ==
Thomas grew up in Carmichael, California and attended Jesuit High School in the Sacramento area. At Jesuit, he led the team in passing, rushing, tackles and scoring and therefore was named on the MaxPreps All-Sac-Joaquin Section First Team, Sacramento Bee All-Metro First Team on offense, and was Sac-Joaquin Section Delta River All-Purpose Player of the Year. He completed 57/156 passes for 1,049 yards and 13 touchdowns. He also rushed for 932 yards and 9 touchdowns. On defense, Thomas had 69 tackles (40 solo).

Sperbeck was considered a two-star pick by Scout.com. He was ranked 115th in his position. Thomas ran a 40-yard dash time of 4.44.

== College career ==
=== 2013 ===
Sperbeck began his freshman year redshirting the first three games. His redshirt was removed and appeared in eight of the final nine games for the season, missing a contest due to a sprained ankle, and catching 5 passes for 40 yards, including a season-high two receptions in a game vs BYU, as well as a 17-yard reception against Oregon State in the Sheraton Hawai'i Bowl on December 24. The former high school quarterback attempted a pass against Utah State but under threw his receiver which resulted in an interception.

=== 2014 ===
In the 2014 season Thomas appeared in 14 games and started 8, he led the team with 877 receiving yards, was second on the team with 51 catches and tied for third with 3 receiving touchdowns. Thomas made his first collegiate start at Nevada, catching three passes for 51 yards. He also threw his first career touchdown pass that season, to quarterback Grant Hedrick for the game-winning touchdown against Fresno State. Sperbeck scored his first-career touchdown catch in win over BYU on October 24. Thomas Sperbeck ended the season with a high-note, catching 12 passes for 199 yards and being named the Offensive MVP of the Fiesta Bowl in a 38-30 win over Arizona.

=== 2015 ===
In 2015, Thomas set Boise State's single-season record for receiving yards against Air Force on November 20, passing Titus Young's 2010 record of 1,215 receiving yards, on his way to 1,412 yards receiving. He ended the season with 88 receptions for 1,412 yards, averaging 16.0 a catch. Thomas Sperbeck ended his career-best season with a 55-7 rout of Northern Illinois in the Poinsettia Bowl. He had six catches for 78 yards in the game. Additionally, he had a juggling, one-handed catch against Wyoming which won him the Yahoo! Sports Catch of the Year contest.

=== College statistics ===
Year	Team	Games	Rec	Yards	Avg	Long	Rec TDs
2013	Boise State	8	5	40	8.0	17	0
2014	Boise State	14	51	877	17.2	51	3
2015	Boise State	13	88	1,412	16.0	85	8
2016	Boise State	13	80	1,272	15.9	54	9
College totals		48	224	3,601	16.1	85	20

== Professional career ==
Sperbeck signed with the Tampa Bay Buccaneers as an undrafted free agent on May 1, 2017. He was waived/injured on July 30, 2017 and placed on injured reserve. On August 3, 2017, the Buccaneers waived Sperbeck from injured reserve.

On May 17, 2018, Sperbeck re-signed with the Tampa Bay Buccaneers. He was waived/injured by the team on May 23, 2018 and was placed on injured reserve.

== Personal life ==
Thomas is the son of former University of Nevada quarterback and former coach Marshall Sperbeck.
