= Jay Ajayi =

English-born American football player (born 1993)

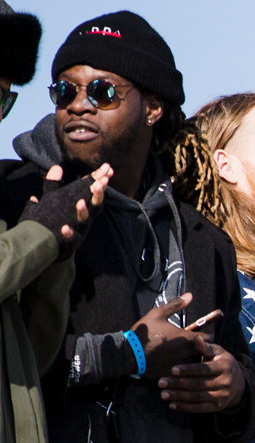
- Ajayi at the Eagles' Super Bowl LII victory parade

No. 23, 36, 26, 28
- Position: Running back

Personal information
- Born: 15 June 1993 (age 33); London, England
- Listed height: 6 ft 0 in (1.83 m)
- Listed weight: 223 lb (101 kg)

Career information
- High school: Liberty (Frisco, Texas)
- College: Boise State (2011–2014)
- NFL draft: 2015: 5th round, 149th overall pick

Career history
- Miami Dolphins (2015–2017); Philadelphia Eagles (2017–2019)

Awards and highlights
- Super Bowl champion (LII); Pro Bowl (2016); Second-team All-American (2014); NCAA scoring co-leader (2014); 2× First-team All-MWC (2013, 2014)

Career NFL statistics
- Rushing yards: 2,546
- Rushing average: 4.5
- Rushing touchdowns: 13
- Receptions: 63
- Receiving yards: 419
- Receiving touchdowns: 1
- Stats at Pro Football Reference

Jay Ajayi (born 15 June 1993) is an American former professional football running back who played in the National Football League (NFL) for five seasons with the Miami Dolphins and Philadelphia Eagles. He played college football at Boise State University and was selected by the Dolphins in the fifth round of the 2015 NFL draft. Ajayi spent three seasons with the Dolphins, earning Pro Bowl honors in 2016, before being traded to Philadelphia during the 2017 season. As a member of the Eagles, Ajayi was a member of the team that won the franchise's first Super Bowl title in Super Bowl LII. He struggled with injuries afterwards, leading to his 2022 retirement.

== Early life ==
Ajayi was born in London, England, on 15 June 1993, to Nigerian parents and moved to Maryland in the United States when he was seven years old in 2000. He eventually moved to Texas, where he attended Frisco Liberty High School. As a senior on the football team, he rushed for 2,240 yards and had 35 touchdowns. He also earned one varsity letter in track & field as a member of the 4 × 400-meter (3:21.75), 4 × 200 m (1:29.44), and 4 × 100 m (42.86) district championship teams.

Considered a three-star recruit by Rivals.com, he was ranked as the 41st best running back prospect of his class.

== College career ==
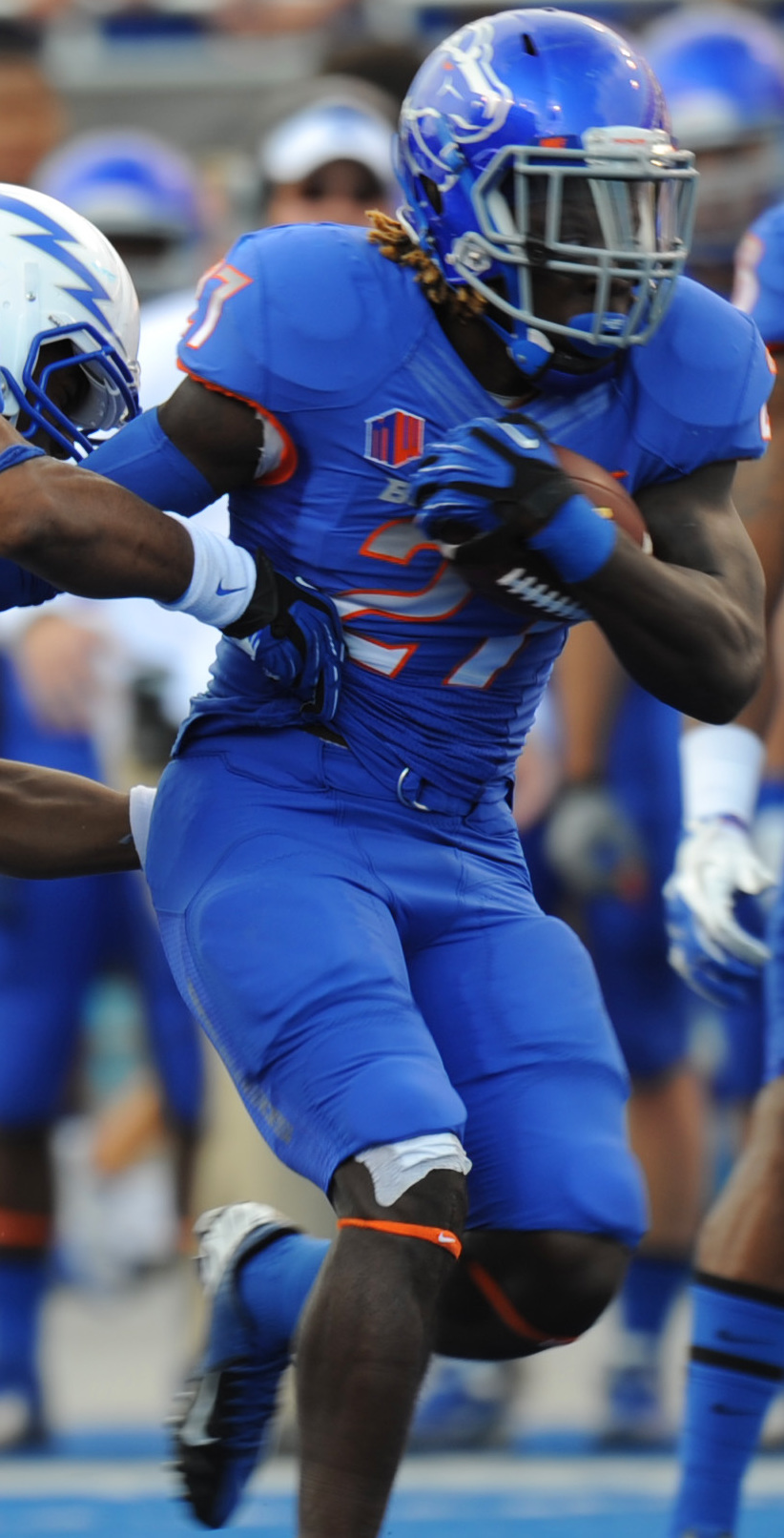
Ajayi with Boise State in 2013

Ajayi attended and played college football for Boise State from 2011 to 2014. He was redshirted as a freshman at Boise State University in 2011. In October 2011, he was arrested for shoplifting after stealing a pair of sweatpants at a local Walmart and was later sentenced to five days in jail. As a redshirt freshman in 2012, he played in 11 games. He had 82 rushes for 548 yards and four touchdowns, including 118 yards and a touchdown on just six carries against New Mexico in his second career game. As a sophomore in 2013, he started 12 of 13 games and rushed for 100+ yards in six of them, including 24 carries for 222 yards and three touchdowns in game seven against Nevada. He ended the season having carried the ball 249 times for 1,425 yards and 18 touchdowns. As a junior in 2014, he became the first Boise State player to rush for 100+ yards in 10 games in a season, including two 200+ yard performances against Colorado State and Utah State. He ended his season with a 134-yard, three touchdown performance in the Broncos' 38–30 victory over the Arizona Wildcats in the 2014 Fiesta Bowl. He finished the season ranked fifth in the nation with a school-record 1,823 rushing yards and second nationally only to Wisconsin's Melvin Gordon with 28 rushing touchdowns (also a school record). He also co-led the NCAA with Gordon with 32 total touchdowns and 192 points scored. Ajayi finished his final season at Boise State having accounted for 41.3% of the team's total yards and touchdowns, third among running back prospects entering the 2015 NFL draft, trailing only Melvin Gordon and Indiana's Tevin Coleman. He was named a first-team All-Mountain West Conference selection for the second consecutive season, earned second-team All-American honors by The Sporting News, and third-team honors by the Associated Press.

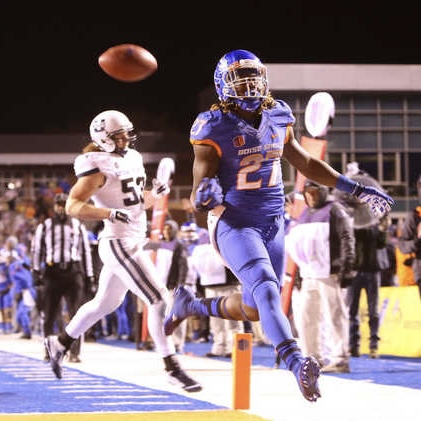
The "JayTrain" scores again vs. Utah State.

On 21 December 2014, Ajayi announced that he would forgo his senior season and enter the 2015 NFL draft. He finished his collegiate career with 678 rushes for 3,796 yards and 50 rushing touchdowns, which ranked third, third, and tied for second on the Boise State career lists. He is the one of only 2 players in Boise State history along with Ashton Jeanty with 3 or more games of 200+ yards rushing.

== Professional career ==
Pre-draft measurables
Height	Weight	Arm length	Hand span	Wingspan	40-yard dash	10-yard split	20-yard split	20-yard shuttle	Three-cone drill	Vertical jump	Broad jump	Bench press
5 ft 11 3/4 in (1.82 m)	221 lb (100 kg)	32 in (0.81 m)	10 in (0.25 m)	6 ft 5 1/8 in (1.96 m)	4.57 s	1.59 s	2.66 s	4.10 s	7.10 s	39 in (0.99 m)	10 ft 1 in (3.07 m)	19 reps
All values from NFL Combine

=== Miami Dolphins ===
==== 2015 season ====
Ajayi was selected in the fifth round of the 2015 NFL draft with the 149th overall pick by the Miami Dolphins (traded from the Minnesota Vikings in exchange for Mike Wallace). He was the 14th of 22 running backs selected in that year's draft. On 7 May 2015, the Dolphins signed him to a four-year, $2.50 million rookie contract, which included a signing bonus of $220,813.

On 6 September 2015, Ajayi was placed on injured reserve/designated to return due to broken ribs he suffered in the Dolphins' last exhibition game. On 8 November 2015, he made his NFL debut against the Buffalo Bills and rushed five times for 41 yards (8.2 average). He scored his first professional touchdown against the San Diego Chargers in a 30–14 defeat. He finished his rookie season with 49 carries for 187 yards (3.8 average) and one touchdown. He also recorded seven receptions for 90 yards.

==== 2016 season ====
After the Dolphins lost starting running back Lamar Miller to the Houston Texans via free agency, Ajayi was appointed the de facto starter going into the season. However, he was declared the backup after free agent running back Arian Foster supplanted him as the starter during training camp. After Ajayi grew disgruntled, head coach Adam Gase deactivated him for the season opener and Ajayi was left in Miami as the team traveled for a road game against the Seattle Seahawks. He was activated the following week and had five carries for 14 yards against the New England Patriots after Foster was sidelined in the second half due to a groin injury. After Foster's injury and eventual in-season retirement, Ajayi settled into a role as the Dolphins' lead running back.

Ajayi followed up a Week 6 204-yard and two touchdown performance against the Pittsburgh Steelers with a 214-yard and one touchdown effort against AFC East the rival Buffalo Bills in Week 7, becoming only the fourth player in NFL history along with O. J. Simpson (twice), Earl Campbell, and former Miami Dolphin Ricky Williams to rush for over two hundred yards in two consecutive games. Ajayi was named AFC Offensive Player of the Week two weeks in a row for his 200+ rushing yards in back-to-back games in Weeks 6 and 7. In Week 16, on Christmas Eve, Ajayi recorded a third 200-yard game, again at the expense of the Buffalo Bills, including a 57-yard rush to set Andrew Franks up to kick a game-winning field goal in overtime. With his 32 carries for 206 yards and a touchdown, he became only the fourth player in NFL history to rush over 200 yards in three games in a single season, and the only player to do it as early as his second season. As a result of his Week 16 performance, he became one of only 15 players in NFL history with three or more career 200+ yard rushing games. He earned AFC Offensive Player of the Week for the third time in the 2016 season. In the 30–12 loss to the Steelers in the Wild Card Round of the playoffs, he had 16 carries for 33 yards in his playoff debut. As a result of his successful season in 2016, he was named to the AFC roster for the 2017 Pro Bowl. He was ranked 69th on the NFL Top 100 Players of 2017 list by his fellow players.

==== 2017 season ====
Ajayi entered the 2017 season as the Dolphins' top running back. The Dolphins did not play in Week 1 due to Hurricane Irma, so Ajayi made his season debut in Week 2 against the Los Angeles Chargers, where he had 28 carries for 122 yards in the 19–17 win. After just 16 and 46 yards in Weeks 3 and 4, Ajayi rebounded for 77 yards against the Tennessee Titans and 130 yards against the Atlanta Falcons. He had just 74 yards total in his next two games, and through Week 8 was the only NFL rusher with 100+ carries yet to record a rushing touchdown.

=== Philadelphia Eagles ===
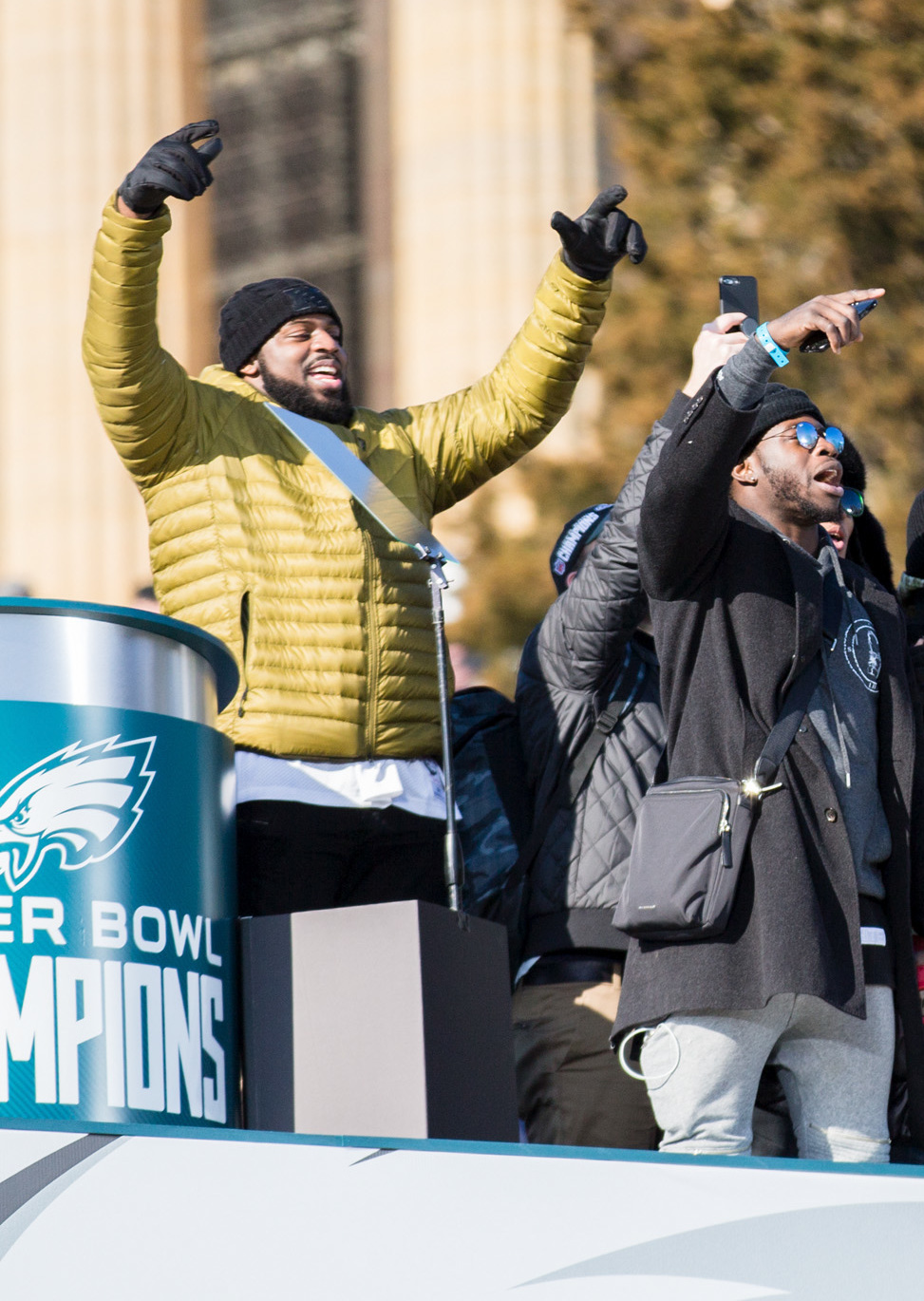
Ajayi (right) and Fletcher Cox (left) celebrate at the Super Bowl LII Victory Parade in Philadelphia

==== 2017 season ====
On 31 October 2017, Ajayi was traded to the Philadelphia Eagles for a 2018 fourth round draft pick. In Ajayi's debut with the Eagles, he rushed for 77 yards on eight carries and one touchdown in a 51–23 rout of the Denver Broncos five days after being traded, his longest being a 46-yard rush for a touchdown. In Week 11, Ajayi rushed for 91 yards on 7 carries against the Dallas Cowboys, helping his team increase their record to 9–1. In the game he had a career high 71 yard rush in the third quarter. The Eagles made the playoffs as the #1-seed in the National Football Conference (NFC). In the Divisional Round against the Falcons, he had 54 rushing yards and 44 receiving yards in the 15–10 victory. In the NFC Championship against the Vikings, he finished with 73 rushing yards and 26 receiving yards in the 38–7 victory. During Super Bowl LII against the Patriots, Ajayi rushed for 57 rushing yards as the Eagles won 41–33, giving them their first Super Bowl win in franchise history.

==== 2018 season ====
In the 2018 season opener against the Falcons, Ajayi recorded his second career multi-touchdown game. He had 15 carries for 62 rushing yards and two rushing touchdowns, with the second being the late go-ahead touchdown, in the 18–12 victory. On 8 October 2018, Ajayi was placed on injured reserve after suffering a torn ACL during Week 5 against the Vikings. He finished the season with 184 rushing yards and three touchdowns.

==== 2019 season ====
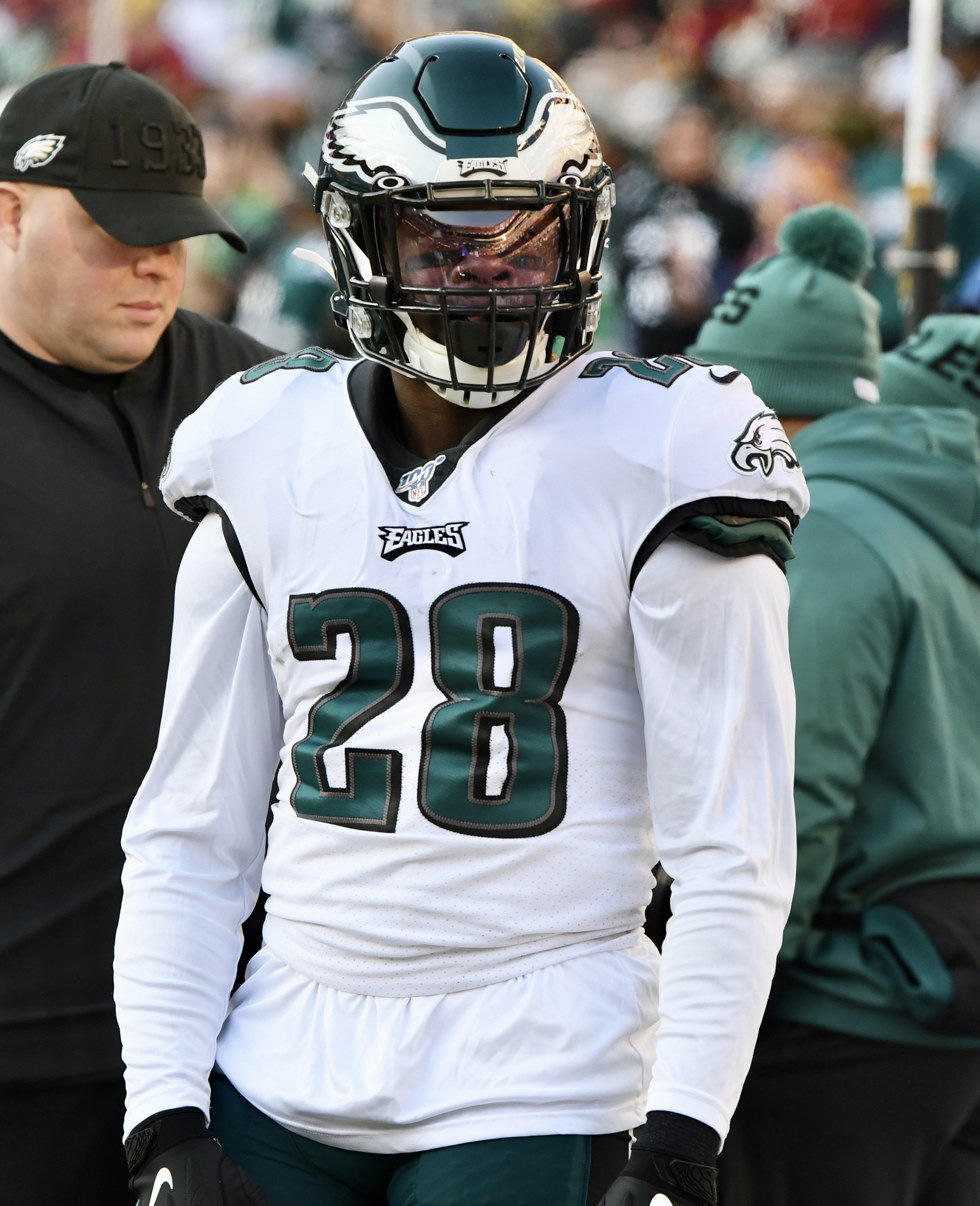
Ajayi with the Philadelphia Eagles in 2019

Ajayi re-signed with the Eagles on 15 November 2019 after they placed running back Darren Sproles on injured reserve. On 23 December 2019, he was released by the Eagles. He appeared in three games and recorded 10 carries for 30 rushing yards.

=== Retirement ===
On 8 January 2022, Ajayi announced his retirement from the NFL. That same evening, he was made the Eagles' honorary captain for the team's final regular season game against the Cowboys.

== Career statistics ==
=== NFL ===
==== Regular season ====
Year	Team	Games		Rushing					Receiving				
Year	Team	GP	GS	Att	Yds	Avg	Lng	TD	Rec	Yds	Avg	Lng	TD
2015	MIA	9	0	49	187	3.8	24	1	7	90	12.9	20	0
2016	MIA	15	12	261	1,272	4.9	62	8	27	151	5.6	15	0
2017	MIA	7	7	138	465	3.4	27	0	14	67	4.8	15	0
2017	PHI	7	1	70	408	5.8	71	1	10	91	9.1	32	1
2018	PHI	4	3	45	184	4.1	20	3	5	20	4.0	12	0
2019	PHI	3	0	10	30	3.0	11	0	0	0	0.0	0	0
Career		45	23	572	2,546	4.5	71	13	63	419	6.7	32	1

==== Postseason ====
Year	Team	Games		Rushing					Receiving				
Year	Team	GP	GS	Att	Yds	Avg	Lng	TD	Rec	Yds	Avg	Lng	TD
2016	MIA	1	1	16	33	2.1	8	0	3	12	4.0	5	0
2017	PHI	3	2	42	184	4.4	26	0	6	70	11.7	32	0
Career		4	3	58	217	3.7	26	0	9	82	9.1	32	0

=== College ===
Season	Team	Rushing					Receiving		
Season	Team	Att	Yds	Avg	Lng	TD	Rec	Yds	TD
2012	Boise State	82	548	6.7	71	4	1	14	0
2013	Boise State	249	1,425	5.7	71	18	22	222	1
2014	Boise State	347	1,823	5.3	74	28	50	535	4
Career		678	3,796	5.6	74	50	73	771	5

== Esports career ==
On 7 January 2020, Ajayi was signed by Major League Soccer's Philadelphia Union as the club's esports player in eMLS League Series One.

== Personal life ==
Ajayi took part in the NFL's "My Cause, My Cleats" campaign in the 2016 season. The campaign allowed players to wear custom cleats supporting their favorite charities. His cause was multiple endocrine neoplasia. He is a lifelong fan of Arsenal F.C. in the Premier League.
