= Titus Young =

American football player (born 1989)

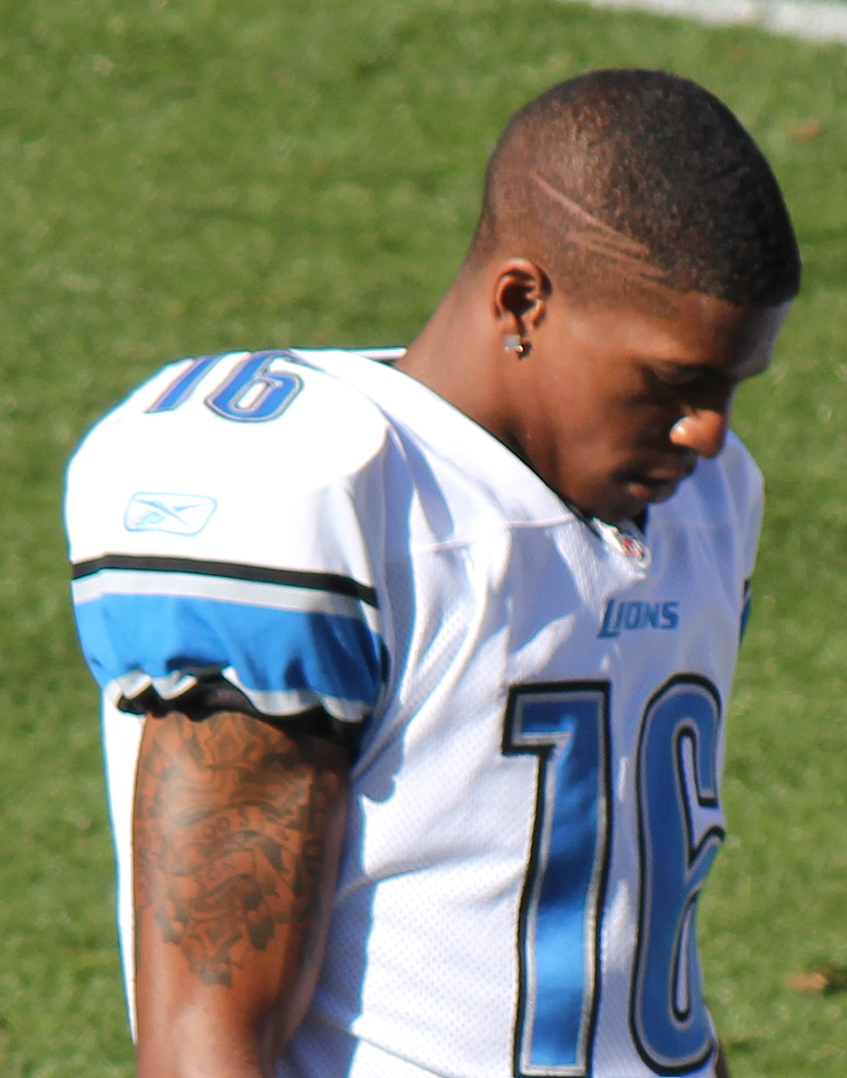
- Young with the Detroit Lions in 2011

No. 16
- Position: Wide receiver

Personal information
- Born: August 21, 1989 (age 37); Los Angeles, California, U.S.
- Listed height: 5 ft 11 in (1.80 m)
- Listed weight: 174 lb (79 kg)

Career information
- High school: University (Los Angeles)
- College: Boise State (2007–2010)
- NFL draft: 2011: 2nd round, 44th overall pick

Career history
- Detroit Lions (2011–2012); St. Louis Rams (2013)*
- * Offseason or practice squad member only

Awards and highlights
- Third-team All-American (2010); 3× First-team All-WAC (2008, 2009, 2010)

Career NFL statistics
- Receptions: 81
- Receiving yards: 990
- Receiving average: 12.2
- Receiving touchdowns: 10
- Stats at Pro Football Reference

Titus Demetrius Young, Sr. (born August 21, 1989) is an American former professional football player who was a wide receiver for the Detroit Lions of the National Football League (NFL) from 2011 to 2012. He played college football for the Boise State Broncos and was drafted by the Lions in the second round of the 2011 NFL draft.

== College career ==
At University High School in Los Angeles, Young was a two-way wide receiver and defensive back. He drew attention from collegiate scouts, described as a "fearless" hard-hitting safety. He accepted a scholarship to play for Boise State in 2007.

He set university records over the course of his collegiate career, with 204 receptions for 3,063 yards and 25 touchdowns- including 71 receptions for 1,215 yards and 9 touchdowns in 2010.. He had a career record long reception for 83 yards during a 42–7 win over the Hawaii Warriors in 2010.

After excelling in his freshman year, Young was suspended much of his sophomore year for missing mandatory workouts and arguing with coaches. Described by one Sports Illustrated journalist as a disciplinary "wake-up call" for Young, he went on to play impressive junior and senior seasons. He was considered a promising NFL prospect at the end of his collegiate career and was approached by prominent NFL talent and marketing representative Mike Ornstein.

== Professional career ==
Pre-draft measurables
Height	Weight	Arm length	Hand span	Wingspan	40-yard dash	10-yard split	20-yard split	20-yard shuttle	Three-cone drill	Vertical jump	Broad jump
5 ft 11 3/8 in (1.81 m)	174 lb (79 kg)	30 7/8 in (0.78 m)	9 in (0.23 m)	6 ft 0 5/8 in (1.84 m)	4.39 s	1.58 s	2.53 s	4.30 s	6.85 s	35 in (0.89 m)	10 ft 3 in (3.12 m)
All values from NFL Combine/Pro Day

=== Draft ===
Young declared himself eligible for the 2011 NFL draft and was selected 44th overall by the Detroit Lions.

=== Detroit Lions ===
After making the 2011 roster, Young was primarily used as the team's 2nd wide receiver, and played frequently in three-WR sets. On October 30 in a 45–10 defeat of the Denver Broncos, Young caught 4 passes for 66 yards, including his first career receiving touchdown. He caught two passes for touchdowns in a 45–41 loss to the Green Bay Packers on New Year's Day. Young was named the Lions-Detroit Sports Broadcasters Association Rookie of the Year for 2011.

He exhibited behavioral changes and became increasingly undisciplined on the field throughout the season. This culminated in a Week 13 game against the New Orleans Saints, when he shoved safety Malcolm Jenkins in the face, drawing an unsportsmanlike conduct penalty. He was benched for the rest of the game.

On May 21, 2012, the Lions sent Young home for two weeks after he punched Louis Delmas. On November 19, the Lions sent him home again for his behavior the previous day against the Green Bay Packers. According to Lions coaches, Young deliberately lined up in the wrong position twice and got into a verbal confrontation with receivers coach Shawn Jefferson. It was the last meaningful game Young ever played. He was deactivated for the team's Thanksgiving Day game a week later against the Houston Texans, as well as the next week's game against the Indianapolis Colts.

On December 5, the Lions placed Young on injured reserve, ending his season. To express his frustration, Young tweeted about not wanting to play anymore if he did not get the ball. A little more than a month later, on February 4, the Lions released Young.

=== St. Louis Rams ===
On February 5, 2013, Young was claimed off waivers by the St. Louis Rams. The Rams were the only team that turned in a waiver claim for Young. However, he was released 10 days later, with the Rams saying they wanted to go "in a different direction". According to Sports Illustrated, the Rams cut ties with him due to concerns about his behavior. He seemed lost in interviews with head coach Jeff Fisher and other team personnel, and threw a fit when he was briefly barred from boarding a flight to Los Angeles after forgetting his ID.

== Legal issues ==
On May 5, 2013, Young was arrested twice in the same day. He was arrested for suspected drunk driving, and 14 hours later he was arrested for attempting to steal his impounded car from the tow yard. Later that week on May 10, Young was arrested for a third time and charged on suspicion of burglary, resisting arrest and assaulting an officer in San Clemente, California.

On May 13, 2013, Young's father, Richard, revealed his son has a severe mental disorder and badly needed help. According to Sports Illustrated, Young's family briefly checked him into Resnick Neuropsychiatric Hospital at UCLA shortly after the Rams released him. He also briefly spent time at a facility in Detroit. Several people close to Young believed that his problems stem from concussions. He suffered at least one concussion in high school; University High players frequently led with their heads in a time when the dangers of that practice were not well known. He also claimed to have suffered concussions in college, and may have suffered one or two in his rookie year with the Lions. Richard Young believes his son's brain was compressed in the front of his skull at one point.

On August 27, 2013, a California judge issued a bench warrant for Titus Young's arrest after Young missed a court hearing on charges of burglary and attempted burglary.

On December 18, 2013, Orange County prosecutors revealed that the criminal case against Young was close to being settled, but Young's trial was delayed again when he was hospitalized for "unspecified treatment".

Young was arrested again on July 9, 2014, on five counts of battery. He was held in Los Angeles on $105,000 bail. In December 2014, a judge ordered that Young must stand trial. In May 2015, Young was sentenced to one year of inpatient treatment at a rehabilitation center in Escondido, California, and five years' probation.

== Health and mental health ==
It has been noted publicly by Young as well as some of his coaching staff, family members, legal representatives, and medical professionals that he may have CTE from numerous head traumas. He was diagnosed with bipolar disorder in 2013.

== Career statistics ==
Season	Team	Games		Receiving						Fumbles
Season	Team	GP	Rec	Yds	Avg	Lng	TD	FD	FUM	Lost
2011	Detroit Lions	16	48	607	12.6	57	6	33	1	0
2012	Detroit Lions	10	33	383	11.6	46	4	20	0	0
	Total	26	81	990	12.2	57	10	53	1	0
