= 2014 Fiesta Bowl (December) =

2014 Vizio Fiesta Bowl
- CFP New Year’s Six; 44th Fiesta Bowl
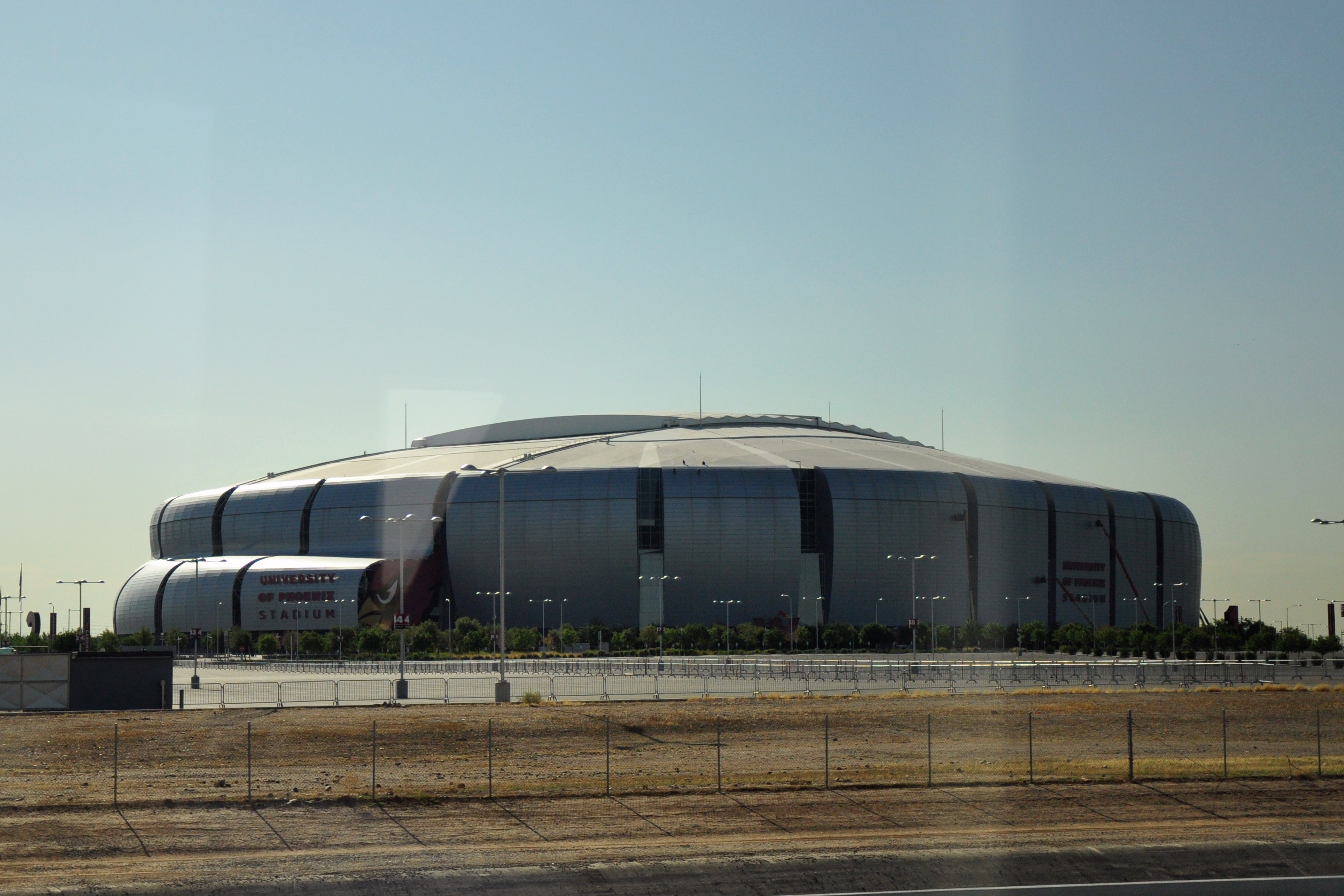
- University of Phoenix Stadium in Glendale, Arizona, hosted the Fiesta Bowl.
Boise State Broncos	Arizona Wildcats
(11–2)	(10–3)
Mountain West	Pac-12
38	30
Head coach: Bryan Harsin	Head coach: Rich Rodriguez
AP / Coaches / CFP; 21 / 21 / 20	AP / Coaches / CFP; 12 / 11 / 10
	1	2	3	4	Total
Boise State	21	10	7	0	38
Arizona	7	10	10	3	30
- Date: December 31, 2014
- Season: 2014
- Stadium: University of Phoenix Stadium
- Location: Glendale, Arizona
- MVP: Offensive: Boise State WR Thomas Sperbeck; Defensive: Boise State LB Tanner Vallejo
- Favorite: Arizona by 3.5
- National anthem: Jesse McGuire
- Referee: John O'Neill (Big Ten)
- Halftime show: The Pride of Arizona (University of Arizona) and the Keith Stein Blue Thunder Marching Band (Boise State)
- Attendance: 66,896
- Payout: US$24 million (2014)

United States TV coverage
- Network: ESPN/ESPN Radio
- Announcers: Sean McDonough, Chris Spielman, and Todd McShay/Dave Flemming, Danny Kanell, and Allison Williams
- Nielsen ratings: 4.6 (7.4 Million viewers)

The 2014 Fiesta Bowl was a college football bowl game played on December 31, 2014, at University of Phoenix Stadium in Glendale, Arizona. It was one of the 2014–15 bowl games that conclude the 2014 FBS football season. The game was sponsored by the Vizio consumer electronics company and is officially known as the Vizio Fiesta Bowl.

The game was televised on ESPN and ESPN Deportes, and broadcast on ESPN Radio and XM Satellite Radio, with kickoff at 4:00 pm ET (2 pm MT).

== Teams ==
The two participants for the game were determined by the College Football Playoff selection committee, and consisted of at-large selections and/or the highest ranked team from the "Group of Five" conferences.

This was the first overall meeting between these two teams.

== Game summary ==
=== Scoring summary ===
Scoring summary

Quarter	Time	Drive			Team	Scoring information	Score	
Quarter	Time	Plays	Yards	TOP	Team	Scoring information	BSU	ARIZ
1	13:18	4	78	1:42	BSU	Jay Ajayi 56-yard touchdown run, Dan Goodale kick good	7	0
1	9:17	6	88	2:30	BSU	Chaz Anderson 57-yard touchdown reception from Grant Hedrick, Dan Goodale kick good	14	0
1	5:12	6	80	2:11	BSU	Jay Ajayi 16-yard touchdown run, Dan Goodale kick good	21	0
1	1:23	11	65	3:49	ARIZ	Anu Solomon 1-yard touchdown run, Casey Skowron kick good	21	7
2	11:56	5	22	2:40	BSU	Jay Ajayi 1-yard touchdown run, Dan Goodale kick good	28	7
2	8:03	13	83	3:53	ARIZ	Nick Wilson 1-yard touchdown run, Casey Skowron kick good	28	14
2	0:30	4	5	0:23	ARIZ	42-yard field goal by Casey Skowron	28	17
2	0:03	4	57	0:27	BSU	36-yard field goal by Dan Goodale	31	17
3	9:11	14	50	4:18	ARIZ	24-yard field goal by Casey Skowron	31	20
3	1:57	–	–	–	BSU	Interception returned 16 yards for touchdown by Donte Deayon, Dan Goodale kick good	38	20
3	0:41	5	75	1:16	ARIZ	Samajie Grant 51-yard touchdown reception from Anu Solomon, Casey Skowron kick good	38	27
4	6:11	10	50	3:06	ARIZ	24-yard field goal by Casey Skowron	38	30
"TOP" = time of possession. For other American football terms, see Glossary of American football.							38	30

=== Statistics ===
Statistics	BSU	ARIZ
First downs	22	29
Plays–yards	69–471	106–492
Rushes–yards	34–162	56–157
Passing yards	309	335
Passing: Comp–Att–Int	24–35–1	28–49–2
Time of possession	29:01	30:59

== Fiesta Bowl history ==
Prior to the 2014–15 NCAA football season, the Fiesta Bowl became one of the six bowls that comprise the College Football Playoff (CFP). This game between Boise State and Arizona ended the Fiesta Bowl's 16-year tie-in with the Big 12; since 1999, the Big 12 champion had hosted the Fiesta Bowl when it is not playing in the national championship game.

The preceding Fiesta Bowl was actually played on New Year's Day, which naturally was also in 2014. There therefore were two 2014 Fiesta Bowls.
