= List of Boise State Broncos football seasons =

== Seasons ==
Boise State Broncos football has created a successful track record since its formation, featuring several division championship wins as well as participation in bowls. The history of performance for this team in the divisions is chronicled in its annual records.

Year	Coach	Overall	Conference	Standing	Bowl/playoffs	Coaches^{#}	AP^{°}
Dusty Kline (Independent) (1933)
1933	Dusty Kline	1–2–1					
Max Eiden (Independent) (1934–1937)
1934	Max Eiden	4–3					
1935	Max Eiden	4–4					
1936	Max Eiden	3–4					
1937	Max Eiden	0–6–1					
Harry Jacoby (Independent) (1938–1946)
1938	Harry Jacoby	2–4					
1939	Harry Jacoby	4–2					
1940	Harry Jacoby	4–2					
1941	Harry Jacoby (Note: George Allison served as interim head football coach following Harry Jacoby being called into active duty in the United States Army midway through the 1941 season. Allison compiled a 2–1 record as the coach of the Broncos.)	3–4					
1942	No team						
1943	No team						
1944	No team						
1945	No team						
1946	Harry Jacoby	3–4–2					
Lyle Smith (Independent) (1947)
1947	Lyle Smith	9–0					
Lyle Smith (Intermountain Collegiate Athletic Conference) (1948–1950)
1948	Lyle Smith	9–0	3–0 (Note: Boise State was undefeated in ICAC league play, but did not play enough conference opponents to be eligible for the conference championship.)	N/A			
1949	Lyle Smith	10–0	5–0	1st	W Potato		
1950	Lyle Smith (Note: Smith was head coach for the first three games of the 1950 season before being recalled to the Navy during the Korean War. George Blankley coached the remainder of the 1950 season.)	9–1	5–0	1st	L Junior Rose		
George Blankley (Intermountain Collegiate Athletic Conference) (1950–1951)
1951	George Blankley	9–1	4–0	1st	W Potato		
Lyle Smith (Intermountain Collegiate Athletic Conference) (1952–1967)
1952	Lyle Smith	8–1	3–0	1st	L Bronco		
1953	Lyle Smith	8–1	3–0	1st	L Bronco		
1954	Lyle Smith	9–1–1	4–0–1	1st	L Potato		
1955	Lyle Smith	7–2	3–0	1st			
1956	Lyle Smith	8–0–1	4–0	T–1st			
1957	Lyle Smith	9–1	5–0	1st	L Potato		
1958	Lyle Smith	10–0	4–0	1st	W NJCAA Championship Game		
1959	Lyle Smith	7–2–1	3–1	2nd			
1960	Lyle Smith	8–2	5–0	1st			
1961	Lyle Smith	9–1	6–0	1st			
1962	Lyle Smith	5–2–2	3–1	2nd			
1963	Lyle Smith	5–3–1	3–2				
1964	Lyle Smith	8–2	3–1	2nd			
1965	Lyle Smith	9–2	4–0	1st	L Potato		
1966	Lyle Smith	9–1	4–0	1st			
1967	Lyle Smith	6–4	2–2				
Tony Knap (NAIA Independent) (1968–1969)
1968	Tony Knap	8–2					
1969	Tony Knap	9–1					
Tony Knap (Big Sky Conference) (1970–1975)
1970	Tony Knap	8–3	2–2	T–3rd			
1971	Tony Knap	10–2	4–2	2nd	W Camellia	13	7
1972	Tony Knap	7–4	3–3	T–3rd			
1973	Tony Knap	10–3	6–0	1st	L NCAA Division II Semifinal (Pioneer)	8	T–5
1974	Tony Knap	10–2	6–0	1st	L NCAA Division II Quarterfinal	3	5
1975	Tony Knap	9–2–1	5–0–1	1st	L NCAA Division II Quarterfinal	5	8
Jim Criner (Big Sky Conference) (1976–1982)
1976	Jim Criner	5–5–1	2–4	5th			
1977	Jim Criner	9–2	6–0	1st	(Note: Boise State concluded its regular season after the NCAA Division II playoffs started; runner-up Northern Arizona was awarded playoff bid.)		T–5
1978	Jim Criner	7–4	3–3	4th			
1979	Jim Criner	7–0	{{{conference}}}	(Note: The Broncos were on probation for a scouting violation in November 1978; they were ineligible for the league title, AP poll, or I-AA playoffs in 1979 and were not allowed to scouting films of upcoming opponents.)	Ineligible		
1980	Jim Criner	10–3	6–1	1st	W NCAA Division I-AA Championship		7
1981	Jim Criner	10–3	6–1	2nd	L NCAA Division I-AA Semifinal		5
1982	Jim Criner	8–3	4–3	4th			15
Lyle Setencich (Big Sky Conference) (1983–1986)
1983	Lyle Setencich	6–5	4–3	T–3rd			
1984	Lyle Setencich	6–5	4–3	T–3rd			
1985	Lyle Setencich	7–4	5–2	3rd			
1986	Lyle Setencich	5–6	3–4	5th			
Skip Hall (Big Sky Conference) (1987–1992)
1987	Skip Hall	6–5	4–4	T–4th			
1988	Skip Hall	8–4	5–3	3rd	L NCAA Division I-AA First Round		12
1989	Skip Hall	6–5	5–3	T–3rd			
1990	Skip Hall	10–4	6–2	T–2nd	L NCAA Division I-AA Semifinal		10
1991	Skip Hall	7–4	4–4	T–4th			
1992	Skip Hall	5–6	3–4	5th			
Pokey Allen (Big Sky Conference) (1993–1995)
1993	Pokey Allen	3–8	1–6	7th			
1994	Pokey Allen	13–2	6–1	1st	L NCAA Division I-AA Championship		3
1995	Pokey Allen	7–4	4–3	T–2nd			21
Tom Mason (Big West Conference) (1996)
1996	Tom Mason	2–10 (Note: Defensive coordinator Tom Mason served as interim head coach for the first ten games of the season while Allen was on a leave of absence. Allen returned for the final two games.)	1–4	5th			
Houston Nutt (Big West Conference) (1997)
1997	Houston Nutt	5–6 (Note: Cal State Northridge's 63–23 win over Boise State on August 30 was forfeited for infractions.)	3–2	3rd			
Dirk Koetter (Big West Conference) (1998–2000)
1998	Dirk Koetter	6–5	2–3	4th			
1999	Dirk Koetter	10–3	5–1	1st	W Humanitarian		
2000	Dirk Koetter	10–2	5–0	1st	W Humanitarian		
Dan Hawkins (Western Athletic Conference) (2001–2005)
2001	Dan Hawkins	8–4	6–2	2nd			
2002	Dan Hawkins	12–1	8–0	1st	W Humanitarian	12	15
2003	Dan Hawkins	13–1	8–0	1st	W Fort Worth	15	16
2004	Dan Hawkins	11–1	8–0	1st	L Liberty	13	12
2005	Dan Hawkins	9–4	7–1	T–1st	L MPC Computers		
Chris Petersen (Western Athletic Conference) (2006–2010)
2006	Chris Peterson	13–0	8–0	1st	W Fiesta^{†}	6	5
2007	Chris Peterson	10–3	7–1	2nd	L Hawaii		
2008	Chris Peterson	12–1	8–0	1st	L Poinsettia	13	11
2009	Chris Peterson	14–0	8–0	1st	W Fiesta^{†}	4	4
2010	Chris Peterson	12–1	7–1	T–1st	W Maaco	7	9
Chris Petersen (Mountain West Conference) (2011–2013)
2011	Chris Peterson	12–1	6–1	2nd	W Maaco	6	8
2012	Chris Peterson	11–2	7–1	T–1st	W Maaco	14	18
2013	Chris Peterson	8–5 (Note: On December 6, it was announced that head coach Chris Petersen would resign to take the head coaching job at Washington. In eight seasons at Boise State, he posted a record of 92–12, won five conference titles and two BCS games. Assistant head coach Bob Gregory served as Boise State's interim head coach in their bowl game. On December 11, The Broncos hired former offensive coordinator and Arkansas State head coach Bryan Harsin as their permanent head coach.)	6–2	2nd (Mountain)	L Hawaii		
Bryan Harsin (Mountain West Conference) (2014–2020)
2014	Bryan Harsin	12–2	7–1	1st (Mountain)	W Fiesta^{†}	16	16
2015	Bryan Harsin	9–4	5–3	T–2nd (Mountain)	W Poinsettia		
2016	Bryan Harsin	10–3	6–2	T–1st (Mountain)	L Cactus		
2017	Bryan Harsin	11–3	7–1	1st (Mountain)	W Las Vegas	22	22
2018	Bryan Harsin	10–3	7–1	T–1st (Mountain)	CX First Responder (Note: The First Responder Bowl was cancelled due to inclement weather and ruled a no contest.)	23	24
2019	Bryan Harsin	12–2	8–0	1st (Mountain)	L Las Vegas	22	23
2020	Bryan Harsin	5–2	5–0	2nd			
Andy Avalos (Mountain West Conference) (2021–2023)
2021	Andy Avalos	7–5	5–3	3rd (Mountain)	CX Arizona		
2022	Andy Avalos	10–4	8–0	1st (Mountain)	W Frisco		
2023	Andy Avalos (Note: On November 12, 2023, Danielson was named interim head coach after head coach Andy Avalos was fired.)	8–6	6–2	T-1st	L LA		
Spencer Danielson (Mountain West Conference) (2023–2025)
2024	Spencer Danielson	12–2	7–0	1st	L Fiesta^{†} (CFP Quarterfinal)	9	8
2025	Spencer Danielson	9–5	6–2	1st	L LA		
Spencer Danielson (Pac-12 Conference) (2026–present)
2026	Spencer Danielson	9-1	6-0			15	15
Total:		672–252–11					
National championship Conference title Conference division title or championship game berth
^{†}Indicates Bowl Coalition, Bowl Alliance, BCS, or CFP / New Years' Six bowl.; ^{#}Rankings from final Coaches Poll.
