= Boise State Broncos football =

College football team

2026 Boise State Broncos football team
- First season: 1933; 93 years ago (Note: At that time, the school was a two-year college known as Boise Junior College. The school later became a four-year institution and began competing against four-year schools in football in 1968.)
- Athletic director: Jeramiah Dickey
- General manager: Brandon Jones
- Head coach: Spencer Danielson; 4th season, 33–9 (.786)
- Location: Boise, Idaho
- Stadium: Albertsons Stadium (capacity: 32,423)
- NCAA division: Division I FBS
- Conference: Pac-12
- Colors: Blue and orange
- All-time record: 719–256–12 (.735)
- CFP record: 0–1 (.000)
- Bowl record: 13–10 (.565)

NCAA Division I FCS championships
- 1980

College Football Playoff appearances
- 2024

Conference championships
- Big Sky: 1973, 1974, 1975, 1977, 1980, 1994 Big West: 1999, 2000 WAC: 2002, 2003, 2004, 2005, 2006, 2008, 2009, 2010 MW: 2012, 2014, 2017, 2019, 2023, 2024, 2025

Division championships
- MW Mountain: 2014, 2016, 2017, 2018, 2019, 2022
- Consensus All-Americans: 4
- Rivalries: Fresno State (rivalry); Nevada (rivalry; hiatus); Idaho (rivalry; dormant); Washington State (rivalry)

Uniforms
- Fight song: Orange and Blue
- Mascot: Buster Bronco
- Marching band: Keith Stein Blue Thunder Marching Band
- Outfitter: Nike
- Website: broncosports.com

The Boise State Broncos football program represents Boise State University in college football. The Broncos compete in the NCAA Division I Football Bowl Subdivision (FBS) as a member of the Pac-12 Conference. Boise State officially joined the Pac-12 on July 1, 2026.

The Broncos play their home games at Albertsons Stadium in Boise, Idaho. The stadium has a listed capacity of 32,423 and is known for its blue artificial playing surface, commonly called "The Blue." The team's head coach is Spencer Danielson.

Boise State began football in 1933 as Boise Junior College. The program has won national championships at the junior-college level in 1958 and the Division I-AA level in 1980. Since beginning competition as a four-year program, Boise State has won 23 conference championships and six Mountain West Mountain Division titles.

Boise State has recorded seven undefeated seasons: 1947, 1948, 1949, 1950, 1958, 2006, and 2009. The Broncos have made nine NCAA or College Football Playoff appearances, including their first appearance in the College Football Playoff following the 2024 season. Boise State is 3–1 in the Fiesta Bowl, with victories following the 2006, 2009, and 2014 seasons.

Through October 24, 2026, Boise State's four-year-school record is 518–194–2 (.727).

== History ==
=== Early history (1933–1946) ===
Boise Junior College fielded its first football team in 1933 under head coach Dusty Kline, finishing 1–2–1. Max Eiden coached the program from 1934 through 1937, followed by Harry Jacoby. George "Stub" Allison also coached part of the 1941 season. Football was suspended from 1942 through 1945 during World War II before returning in 1946.

=== Lyle Smith era (1947–1967) ===
Lyle Smith became head coach in 1947 and developed Boise Junior College into a regional power. His first three teams went undefeated, and the Broncos opened his tenure with 31 consecutive victories. Smith briefly left the program for military service during the 1950 season, with George Blankley coaching the Broncos through 1951.

Smith returned in 1952. His 1958 team finished 10–0 and won the NJCAA National Football Championship, defeating Tyler Junior College 22–0. Smith's Boise teams finished with a combined record of 156–25–6. He remained associated with Boise State for decades, and the playing field at Albertsons Stadium was later named Lyle Smith Field in his honor.

=== Tony Knap era (1968–1975) ===
Boise State began its four-year football era in 1968 under Tony Knap. The Broncos competed as an independent for two seasons before joining the Big Sky Conference in 1970.

Under Knap, Boise State won consecutive Big Sky championships in 1973, 1974, and 1975 and reached the NCAA Division II playoffs in each of those seasons. Knap finished his Boise State career with a 71–19–1 record.

=== Jim Criner era (1976–1982) ===
Jim Criner succeeded Knap in 1976. Boise State won the Big Sky championship in 1977 and moved with the conference into the newly created NCAA Division I-AA classification in 1978.

The 1980 Broncos won the Big Sky championship and advanced through the Division I-AA playoffs. Boise State defeated Eastern Kentucky 31–29 in the 1980 NCAA Division I-AA Football Championship Game to win the program's Division I-AA national championship. Criner compiled a 59–21–1 record at Boise State.

=== Lyle Setencich era (1983–1986) ===
Lyle Setencich coached Boise State from 1983 through 1986, compiling a 24–20 record. The 1986 season also marked the debut of the blue artificial playing surface at Bronco Stadium, which became one of the program's most recognizable features.

=== Skip Hall era (1987–1992) ===
Skip Hall coached Boise State for six seasons from 1987 through 1992. The Broncos returned to the Division I-AA playoffs in 1988 and reached the national semifinals in 1990. Hall finished his tenure with a 42–28 record.

=== Pokey Allen era (1993–1996) ===
Pokey Allen became head coach in 1993. Boise State reached the 1994 NCAA Division I-AA Football Championship Game after a 13–2 season, losing to Youngstown State in the national championship game.

Boise State moved from Division I-AA to Division I-A and joined the Big West Conference in 1996. Allen missed much of that season while undergoing treatment for cancer, with assistant Tom Mason serving as interim head coach. Allen died in December 1996.

=== Houston Nutt era (1997) ===
Houston Nutt coached Boise State for one season in 1997. The Broncos finished 5–6 and closed the season with a victory over rival Idaho. Nutt left after the season to become head coach at Arkansas.

=== Dirk Koetter era (1998–2000) ===
Dirk Koetter coached Boise State from 1998 through 2000. The Broncos won the Big West Conference in 1999 and 2000 and captured consecutive Humanitarian Bowl victories. Koetter finished 26–10 before leaving for Arizona State.

=== Dan Hawkins era (2001–2005) ===
Dan Hawkins became head coach in 2001, the same year Boise State joined the Western Athletic Conference. Boise State won four consecutive WAC championships from 2002 through 2005 and developed into one of the nation's most successful non-BCS programs.

Hawkins finished 53–11 at Boise State, including a 37–3 conference record, before leaving to become head coach at Colorado.

=== Chris Petersen era (2006–2013) ===
Chris Petersen was promoted to head coach in 2006. In his first season, Boise State went 13–0, won the WAC championship, and defeated Oklahoma 43–42 in overtime in the 2007 Fiesta Bowl.

The Broncos again finished undefeated in 2009, going 14–0 and defeating TCU 17–10 in the 2010 Fiesta Bowl. Boise State moved from the WAC to the Mountain West Conference in 2011.

Petersen led the Broncos to a 92–12 record before leaving following the 2013 regular season to become head coach at Washington. Assistant Bob Gregory coached Boise State in the 2013 Hawaii Bowl.

=== Bryan Harsin era (2014–2020) ===
Former Boise State quarterback and assistant coach Bryan Harsin was hired as head coach in December 2013.

In 2014, Boise State won the Mountain West championship and defeated Arizona 38–30 in the Fiesta Bowl. Harsin's teams also won Mountain West championships in 2017 and 2019 and reached the conference championship game in 2018 and 2020.

Harsin finished his Boise State tenure with a 69–19 record before leaving for Auburn following the 2020 season.

=== Andy Avalos era (2021–2023) ===
Former Boise State player and defensive coordinator Andy Avalos became head coach in 2021. Boise State went 7–5 in his first season.

The Broncos finished 10–4 in 2022, going undefeated in Mountain West regular-season play and reaching the conference championship game before losing to Fresno State. Boise State ended that season by defeating North Texas 35–32 in the 2022 Frisco Bowl.

Avalos was relieved of his duties on November 12, 2023, after Boise State began the season 5–5. Defensive coordinator Spencer Danielson was appointed interim head coach. Avalos finished his tenure with a 22–14 record.

=== Spencer Danielson era (2023–present) ===
Danielson won his first three games as interim head coach, including a 44–20 victory over UNLV in the 2023 Mountain West Conference Football Championship Game. He became the first interim head coach to win an FBS conference championship game and was named Boise State's permanent head coach on December 3, 2023.

In 2024, Boise State finished 12–2 overall and 7–0 in Mountain West play. The Broncos defeated UNLV 21–7 in the 2024 Mountain West Conference Football Championship Game. Boise State was selected as the No. 3 seed in the expanded 2024–25 College Football Playoff, receiving a first-round bye before losing 31–14 to Penn State in the Fiesta Bowl quarterfinal.

In 2025, Boise State went 9–5 overall and 6–2 in Mountain West play. The Broncos defeated UNLV 38–21 in the conference championship game, becoming the first program in Mountain West history to win three consecutive conference championship games. Boise State lost to Washington 38–10 in the 2025 LA Bowl.

The Broncos entered the Pac-12 Conference in 2026. Through October 31, 2026, Boise State was 7-1 overall and 4-0 in conference play, giving Danielson a career head-coaching record of 31–9.

== Head coaches ==
Head coaching records

NAIA (1968–69), NCAA Division II (1970–77), Division I-AA (1978–95), Division I-A/FBS (1996–present)

Head coach	Seasons	Years	Wins	Losses	Ties	Pct.
Dusty Kline	1	1933	1	2	1	.375
Max Eiden	4	1934–1937	11	17	1	.397
Harry Jacoby	5	1938–1941, 1946	15	15	2	.500
George "Stub" Allison	1	1941	2	1	0	.667
No team, 1942–1945 (World War II)
Lyle Smith	20	1947–1950, 1952–1967	156	25	6	.850
George Blankley	2	1950–1951	16	2	0	.889
Tony Knap	8	1968–1975	71	19	1	.786
Jim Criner	7	1976–1982	59	21	1	.735
Lyle Setencich	4	1983–1986	24	20	0	.545
Skip Hall	6	1987–1992	42	28	0	.600
Pokey Allen	4	1993–1996*	24	15	0	.615
Tom Mason*	1	1996	1	9		.100
Houston Nutt	1	1997	5	6		.455
Dirk Koetter	3	1998–2000	26	10		.722
Dan Hawkins	5	2001–2005	53	11		.828
Chris Petersen	8	2006–2013	92	12		.885
Bob Gregory*	1	2013	0	1		.000
Bryan Harsin	7	2014–2020	69	19		.784
Andy Avalos*	3	2021–2023	22	14		.611
Spencer Danielson	4	2023–present	31	9		.769

Records through October 31, 2026.

- Mason served as interim head coach for most of the 1996 season while Pokey Allen underwent cancer treatment.
- Gregory coached the 2013 Hawaii Bowl after Petersen left for Washington.
- Avalos was replaced by Danielson with two regular-season games remaining in 2023.

== Championships ==
=== National championships ===
Boise State has won two national championships, one at the junior-college level and one in NCAA Division I-AA.

Season	Coach	Division	Overall record	Championship game	Opponent	Result
1958	Lyle Smith	NJCAA	10–0	NJCAA Championship Game	Tyler Junior College	W 22–0
1980	Jim Criner	NCAA Division I-AA	10–3	Division I-AA Championship Game	Eastern Kentucky	W 31–29

=== Conference championships ===
Boise State has won 23 conference championships in four conferences during its four-year competition era, with 20 won outright and three shared. The program's official record book also recognizes additional conference championships from its earlier junior-college era.

Year	Conference	Coach	Conference record	Overall record
1973	Big Sky Conference	Tony Knap	6–0	10–3
1974	Big Sky Conference	Tony Knap	6–0	10–2
1975	Big Sky Conference	Tony Knap	5–0–1	9–2–1
1977	Big Sky Conference	Jim Criner	6–0	9–2
1980	Big Sky Conference	Jim Criner	6–1	10–3
1994	Big Sky Conference	Pokey Allen	6–1	13–2
1999	Big West Conference	Dirk Koetter	5–1	10–3
2000	Big West Conference	Dirk Koetter	5–0	10–2
2002	Western Athletic Conference	Dan Hawkins	8–0	12–1
2003	Western Athletic Conference	Dan Hawkins	8–0	13–1
2004	Western Athletic Conference	Dan Hawkins	8–0	11–1
2005 §	Western Athletic Conference	Dan Hawkins	7–1	9–4
2006	Western Athletic Conference	Chris Petersen	8–0	13–0
2008	Western Athletic Conference	Chris Petersen	8–0	12–1
2009	Western Athletic Conference	Chris Petersen	8–0	14–0
2010 §	Western Athletic Conference	Chris Petersen	7–1	12–1
2012 §	Mountain West Conference	Chris Petersen	7–1	11–2
2014	Mountain West Conference	Bryan Harsin	7–1	12–2
2017	Mountain West Conference	Bryan Harsin	7–1	11–3
2019	Mountain West Conference	Bryan Harsin	8–0	12–2
2023	Mountain West Conference	Spencer Danielson	6–2	8–6
2024	Mountain West Conference	Spencer Danielson	7–0	12–2
2025	Mountain West Conference	Spencer Danielson	6–2	9–5

§ – Conference co-champions

==== Division titles ====
Year	Division	Record
2014	MW Mountain Division	12–2 (7–1)
2016†	MW Mountain Division	10–3 (6–2)
2017	MW Mountain Division	11–3 (7–1)
2018	MW Mountain Division	10–3 (7–1)
2019	MW Mountain Division	12–2 (8–0)
2022	MW Mountain Division	10–4 (8–0)

† – Division co-champions; Boise State did not participate in the Mountain West Championship Game.

The Mountain West eliminated football divisions beginning with the 2023 season and instead selected the two highest-ranked eligible teams in the conference standings for the championship game.

=== Mountain West Football Championship ===
Boise State appeared in nine Mountain West Championship Games and won six, both conference records when the Broncos left the Mountain West following the 2025 season.

Year	Venue	Location	Opponent	Result
2014	Albertsons Stadium	Boise, Idaho	Fresno State	W 28–14
2017	Albertsons Stadium	Boise, Idaho	Fresno State	W 17–14
2018	Albertsons Stadium	Boise, Idaho	Fresno State	L 16–19 ^{OT}
2019	Albertsons Stadium	Boise, Idaho	Hawaii	W 31–10
2020	Sam Boyd Stadium	Whitney, Nevada	San Jose State	L 20–34
2022	Albertsons Stadium	Boise, Idaho	Fresno State	L 16–28
2023	Allegiant Stadium	Paradise, Nevada	UNLV	W 44–20
2024	Albertsons Stadium	Boise, Idaho	UNLV	W 21–7
2025	Albertsons Stadium	Boise, Idaho	UNLV	W 38–21

== Postseason results ==
=== Division I-A/FBS bowl game appearances ===
Boise State has appeared in 23 official Division I-A/FBS bowl games with a record of 13–10. The Broncos also played in postseason bowl games before joining Division I-A, including the 1971 Camellia Bowl, 1973 Pioneer Bowl, and 1980 Camellia Bowl.

The 2018 First Responder Bowl was declared a no contest after severe weather forced the game to be abandoned. Boise State was also selected for the 2021 Arizona Bowl but withdrew because of COVID-19 issues within the program.

Boise State clinched bowl eligibility for a 29th consecutive season with its October 24, 2026 victory over Washington State. The streak is the second-longest active bowl-eligibility streak in the FBS.

Season	Coach	Bowl	Opponent	Result
1971	Tony Knap	Camellia Bowl	Chico State	W 32–28
1973	Tony Knap	Pioneer Bowl	Louisiana Tech	L 34–38
1980	Jim Criner	Camellia Bowl	Eastern Kentucky	W 31–29
1999	Dirk Koetter	Humanitarian Bowl	Louisville	W 34–31
2000	Dirk Koetter	Humanitarian Bowl	UTEP	W 38–23
2002	Dan Hawkins	Humanitarian Bowl	Iowa State	W 34–16
2003	Dan Hawkins	Fort Worth Bowl	TCU	W 34–31
2004	Dan Hawkins	Liberty Bowl	Louisville	L 40–44
2005	Dan Hawkins	MPC Computers Bowl	Boston College	L 21–27
2006	Chris Petersen	Fiesta Bowl †	Oklahoma	W 43–42 ^{OT}
2007	Chris Petersen	Hawaii Bowl	East Carolina	L 38–41
2008	Chris Petersen	Poinsettia Bowl	TCU	L 16–17
2009	Chris Petersen	Fiesta Bowl †	TCU	W 17–10
2010	Chris Petersen	Maaco Bowl Las Vegas	Utah	W 26–3
2011	Chris Petersen	Maaco Bowl Las Vegas	Arizona State	W 56–24
2012	Chris Petersen	Maaco Bowl Las Vegas	Washington	W 28–26
2013	Bob Gregory	Hawaii Bowl	Oregon State	L 23–38
2014	Bryan Harsin	Fiesta Bowl †	Arizona	W 38–30
2015	Bryan Harsin	Poinsettia Bowl	Northern Illinois	W 55–7
2016	Bryan Harsin	Cactus Bowl	Baylor	L 12–31
2017	Bryan Harsin	Las Vegas Bowl	Oregon	W 38–28
2018	Bryan Harsin	First Responder Bowl	Boston College	No contest
2019	Bryan Harsin	Las Vegas Bowl	Washington	L 7–38
2021	Andy Avalos	Arizona Bowl	Central Michigan	No contest (COVID-19 withdrawal)
2022	Andy Avalos	Frisco Bowl	North Texas	W 35–32
2023	Spencer Danielson	LA Bowl	UCLA	L 22–35
2024	Spencer Danielson	Fiesta Bowl (CFP quarterfinal) †	Penn State	L 14–31
2025	Spencer Danielson	LA Bowl	Washington	L 10–38

† CFP / New Year's Six / BCS game

=== Division I-AA playoffs results ===
Boise State competed in Division I-AA from 1978 through 1995. The Broncos made five playoff appearances, compiling an 8–4 record and winning the 1980 national championship.

Year	Round	Opponent	Result
1980	Semifinals; National championship	Grambling State; Eastern Kentucky	W 14–9; W 31–29
1981	Quarterfinals; Semifinals	Jackson State; Eastern Kentucky	W 19–7; L 17–23
1988	First round	Northwestern State	L 13–22
1990	First round Quarterfinals; Semifinals	Northern Iowa; Middle Tennessee State; Nevada	W 20–3; W 20–13; L 52–59 ^{3OT}
1994	First round Quarterfinals; Semifinals; National championship	North Texas; Appalachian State; Marshall; Youngstown State	W 24–20; W 17–14; W 28–24; L 14–28

=== Division II playoffs results ===
The Broncos appeared in the NCAA Division II playoffs three times, finishing 1–3.

Year	Round	Opponent	Result
1973	Quarterfinals; Semifinals	South Dakota; Louisiana Tech	W 53–10; L 34–38
1974	Quarterfinals	Central Michigan	L 6–20
1975	Quarterfinals	Northern Michigan	L 21–24

==== College Division postseason results ====
Boise State appeared in the NCAA College Division postseason following the 1971 season.

Year	Round	Opponent	Result
1971	West regional final (Camellia Bowl)	Chico State	W 32–28

== Top 25 finishes ==
Year	Record	AP Poll	Coaches Poll
2002	12–1	15	12
2003	13–1	16	15
2004	11–1	12	13
2006	13–0	5	6
2008	12–1	11	13
2009	14–0	4	4
2010	12–1	9	7
2011	12–1	8	6
2012	11–2	18	14
2014	12–2	16	16
2017	11–3	22	22
2018	10–3	23	24
2019	12–2	23	22
2024	12–2	8	9

== Albertsons Stadium ==
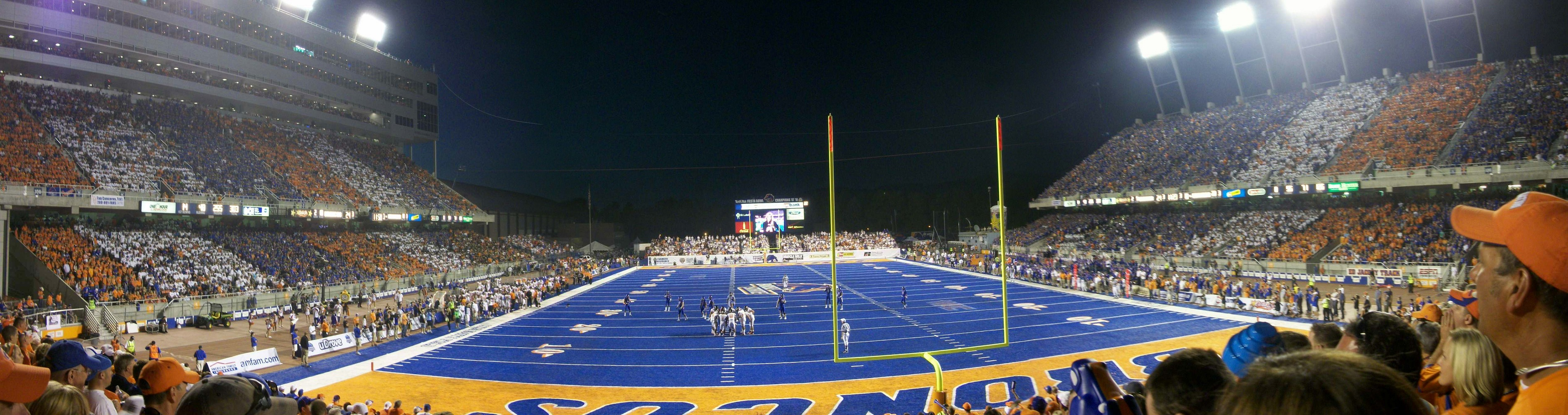
Albertsons Stadium during a 2010 game against Oregon State

Boise State has played its home games at Albertsons Stadium since 1970. The facility was known as Bronco Stadium until 2014 and currently has a listed capacity of 32,423.

The stadium is best known for its blue artificial playing surface. Boise State first installed blue turf in 1986, becoming the first college football program to use a field with a color other than traditional green. The surface is widely known as "The Blue."

In 2026, a new playing surface was installed at Albertsons Stadium. The design added permanent orange markings at the 2-yard and 11-yard lines to honor former Boise State stars Ashton Jeanty and Kellen Moore.

Through October 24, 2026, Boise State is 160–17 (.904) at home since the 1999 season. The Broncos won 47 consecutive home conference games from 1999 through 2011 and went 40–0 in WAC home conference games. Boise State also won 65 consecutive regular-season home games from 2001 through 2011.

=== Blue uniform ban ===
When Boise State joined the Mountain West in 2011, the conference restricted the Broncos from wearing all-blue uniforms during home conference games on the blue playing surface. Under the policy, Boise State could wear blue jerseys or blue pants, but not both simultaneously for a home conference game.

The restriction was removed before the 2013 season after Boise State elected to remain in the Mountain West rather than join the Big East Conference.

=== Hosei Tomahawks ===
In 2012, Boise State granted permission to Hosei University in Tokyo to use a blue playing surface at Tomahawks Field.

== Rivalries ==
=== Fresno State ===
Games played	BSU wins	BSU losses	Win %	First meeting	Last meeting	Next scheduled meeting	Trophy
28	18	10	.643	1977	W 38–31 (2026)	TBD	Milk Can

Boise State and Fresno State first met in 1977. The series became a regular conference matchup after Boise State joined Fresno State in the Western Athletic Conference in 2001. The schools later competed together in the Mountain West and became Pac-12 conference opponents in 2026.

Boise State leads the all-time series 18–10 through the October 10, 2026 meeting.

The regular-season rivalry is associated with the Milk Can trophy. The teams also met in the Mountain West Championship Game in 2014, 2017, 2018, and 2022. Boise State won the 2014 and 2017 championship meetings, while Fresno State won in 2018 and 2022.

Boise State won the first meeting between the programs as Pac-12 members, 38–31, in Fresno on October 10, 2026.

=== Idaho ===
Games played	BSU wins	BSU losses	Ties	Win %	First meeting	Last meeting	Next scheduled meeting	Trophy
40	22	17	1	.563	1971	W 52–14 (2010)	September 6, 2031	Governor's Trophy

Boise State and the Idaho Vandals first played in 1971 and met annually from that season through 2010. The rivalry was a conference matchup for much of its history.

Idaho won 12 consecutive meetings from 1982 through 1993. Boise State later matched that streak by winning the final 12 meetings from 1999 through 2010. Boise State leads the series 22–17–1.

The series went on hiatus after Boise State joined the Mountain West in 2011. On February 12, 2026, the schools announced that the rivalry would resume at Albertsons Stadium on September 6, 2031. The game will be the 41st meeting in the series.

=== Washington State ===
Games played	BSU wins	BSU losses	Win %	First meeting	Last meeting	Next scheduled meeting
8	3	5	.375	1997	W 31–10 (2026)	TBD

Boise State and the Washington State Cougars first played in 1997. The programs became conference opponents when Boise State joined Washington State in the Pac-12 in 2026.

Washington State leads the all-time series 5–3 through October 24, 2026. Boise State has won the two most recent meetings, defeating Washington State 45–24 in 2024 and 31–10 in 2026.

=== Nevada ===
Games played	BSU wins	BSU losses	Win %	First meeting	Last meeting	Next scheduled meeting
47	33	14	.702	1971	W 24–3 (2025)	TBD

Boise State and the Nevada Wolf Pack first met in 1971 and have shared membership in the Big Sky, Big West, Western Athletic, and Mountain West conferences. Boise State leads the all-time series 33–14 through the 2025 meeting.

Notable games include Boise State's 69–67 four-overtime victory in 2007 and Nevada's 34–31 overtime victory over No. 3 Boise State in 2010. The teams also met in the 1990 Division I-AA semifinals, when Nevada won 59–52 in triple overtime.

The most recent meeting was October 24, 2025, when Boise State defeated Nevada 24–3 in Reno.

== All-time record vs. Pac-12 teams ==
Records are current through October 24, 2026.

Opponent	Won	Lost	Percentage	Streak	First	Last
Colorado State	13	1	.929	Won 1	2011	2025
Fresno State	18	10	.643	Won 1	1977	2026
Oregon State	5	6	.455	Won 1	1986	2024
San Diego State	6	5	.545	Lost 1	2011	2025
Texas State	0	0	–	N/A	N/A	N/A
Utah State	26	5	.839	Won 11	1975	2026
Washington State	3	5	.375	Won 2	1997	2026
Totals	71	32	.689			

== Future scheduled non-conference games ==
Announced schedules as of October 28, 2026.

Year	Home games	Away games
2027	Western Illinois; South Florida	Appalachian State; Marshall
2028	Georgia Southern	Cincinnati
2029	Cincinnati; Western Michigan	Washington
2030	Idaho State; Houston	Memphis
2031	Idaho; Memphis	Houston
2032		Rice
2035	Rice	

Future schedules are subject to change.

== Notable honors ==
=== College Football Hall of Famers ===
==== Players ====
- Randy Trautman – DT, 1978–1981

=== Pro Football Hall of Famers ===
==== Players ====
- Dave Wilcox – LB, Boise Junior College 1960–1961; inducted into the Pro Football Hall of Fame in 2000

=== Individual awards ===
==== Kellen Moore Award ====
Kellen Moore Award
Year	Name	Position
2010	Kellen Moore	Quarterback
2011	Kellen Moore	Quarterback

The award was formerly known as the Quarterback of the Year Award. It was renamed for Moore in 2012 after he completed his Boise State career with an FBS-record 50 victories as a starting quarterback.

==== Paul "Bear" Bryant Award ====
- Chris Petersen (2006)
- Chris Petersen (2009)

==== Bobby Dodd Coach of the Year Award ====
- Chris Petersen (2010)

==== Sports Illustrated All-Decade Team ====
- Ryan Clady, OT (2009)

==== Jet Award ====
- Avery Williams (2020)

==== Maxwell Award ====
- Ashton Jeanty (2024)

==== Doak Walker Award ====
- Ashton Jeanty (2024)

==== Earl Campbell Tyler Rose Award ====
- Ashton Jeanty (2024)

==== Bobby Bowden Trophy ====
- Ashton Jeanty (2024)

==== Consensus All-Americans ====
Boise State has had four consensus All-Americans. Jeanty became the first unanimous All-American in program history in 2024.

- Ryan Clady – 2007
- Nate Potter – 2011
- Avery Williams – 2020
- Ashton Jeanty – 2024 (unanimous)

==== AP All-Americans ====
- Ashton Jeanty – 2023 second team all-purpose; 2024 first team running back
- James Ferguson-Reynolds – 2023 third team punter
- Avery Williams – 2020 first team all-purpose/return specialist
- Darian Thompson – 2015 third team safety
- Jay Ajayi – 2014 third team running back
- Nate Potter – 2011 consensus All-American, offensive tackle
- Titus Young – 2010 third team wide receiver
- Kellen Moore – 2009 and 2010 third team quarterback
- Ryan Clady – 2007 consensus All-American, offensive tackle
- Ian Johnson – 2006 third team running back
- Markus Koch – 1985 first team defensive end; 1983 first team defensive tackle
- John Rade – 1982 first team defensive end; 1981 second team linebacker
- Rick Woods – 1981 second team strong safety
- Randy Trautman – 1980 and 1981 first team defensive tackle
- Cedric Minter – 1980 second team and 1978 third team running back

== Retired numbers ==
Boise State Broncos retired number
No.	Player	Pos.	Tenure	Year retired	Ref.
12	Jim McMillan	QB	1971–1974	1978	

McMillan's No. 12 remains the only retired jersey number in Boise State football history.

== Broncos in the NFL ==
=== First-round draft picks ===
Name	Position	Year	Overall pick	Team
Ryan Clady	OT	2008	12	Denver Broncos
Kyle Wilson	CB	2010	29	New York Jets
Shea McClellin	DE	2012	19	Chicago Bears
Doug Martin	RB	2012	31	Tampa Bay Buccaneers
Leighton Vander Esch	LB	2018	19	Dallas Cowboys
Ashton Jeanty	RB	2025	6	Las Vegas Raiders

=== Active NFL ===
NFL roster information updated October 2026.

- Khalil Shakir, Buffalo Bills
- Zion Washington, Cleveland Browns (practice squad)
- Kage Casey, Denver Broncos
- JL Skinner, Denver Broncos
- Ahmed Hassanein, Detroit Lions
- Ezra Cleveland, Jacksonville Jaguars
- Scott Matlock, Los Angeles Chargers
- Ashton Jeanty, Las Vegas Raiders
- John Ojukwu, Philadelphia Eagles (practice squad)
- George Holani, Seattle Seahawks
- DeMarcus Lawrence, Seattle Seahawks
- John Bates, Washington Commanders
- Jeremy McNichols, Washington Commanders
