= Blankley =

Blankley is a surname. Notable people with the surname include:

- Eric Blankley (1910–1954), English cricketer
- George Blankley (1918–2016), coach at Boise Junior College during the mid-20th century
- Tony Blankley (died 2012), U.S. political analyst and commentator

== See also ==
- The Man from Blankley's, 1903 play by F. Anstey made into a 1930 film
