= Eiden (disambiguation) =

Eiden is an abbreviation for Eizan Electric Railway.

Other uses:

- Edmund Eiden (1921–2017), American football player
- Max Eiden (1910–1954), American football player, and coach of football and basketball
