= Boise State Broncos football junior college seasons =

American college football seasons

For the first 31 seasons of Boise State football, the Broncos competed at the two-year junior college level. From 1933 to 1964, the school was known as Boise Junior College, then from 1965 to 1967 it was known as Boise College.

Boise Junior College football started in 1933, one year after the school's establishment. The team initially competed at Public School Field before moving to the on-campus College Field (also known as Chaffee Field) in 1940. Under head coaches Dusty Kline, Max Eiden, and Harry Jacoby, the Broncos only saw modest results. In the early 1940s, the program was disrupted by the outbreak of World War II—in 1941, coach Jacoby was called into Army service, forcing George "Stub" Allison to fill in for the remainder of that season. In 1942, the program was forced to go on hiatus due to depleted male enrollment at the college. In 1946, with the war over, the program returned under Jacoby, and in 1947 first-year assistant Lyle Smith was promoted to head coach.

Boise saw tremendous success under Smith, who won his first 37 games as a head coach (interrupted by a period in 1950 and 1951 in which he was recalled into Naval service in Korea and George Blankley took over as head coach and also saw success). The program moved into a new stadium, Bronco Stadium, in 1950. Success for the Broncos continued throughout the 1950s under Smith, culminating in a NJCAA national championship in 1958. That success continued well into the 1960s, with the Broncos ultimately earning 13 Intermountain Collegiate Athletic Conference football titles, by far the most in that conference's history.

By the mid-1960s, in response to tremendous growth, the school began the transition into a four-year institution. In 1965, the school began offering baccalaureate degrees and changed its name to Boise College. 1967 was the final year for Boise at the two-year level as they moved to the NAIA as an independent. It was also Smith's final year as a coach, as he moved full-time into the athletic director role at Boise. Smith did not suffer a losing record in any of his twenty seasons as head coach.

In 1968, Boise College became Boise State College, and the football program began four-year competition under new head coach Tony Knap, Smith's teammate (in the late 1930s) at the University of Idaho.

== 1930s ==
1933
Head coach: Dusty Kline
Record: 1–2–1

Date	Opponent	Site	Result
October 12	St. Joseph's Catholic School	Public School Field; Boise, ID	L 0–6
November 9	at College of Idaho freshmen	Caldwell, ID	W 25–6
November 18	Albion State Normal	Public School Field; Boise, ID	L 6–7
November 23	St. Joseph's Catholic School	Public School Field; Boise, ID	T 0–0

1934
Head coach: Max Eiden
Record: 4–3

Date	Opponent	Site	Result
September 29	at Eastern Oregon	La Grande, OR	L 0–18
October 12	Ricks	Public School Field; Boise, ID	W 6–0
October 19	Gooding College	Public School Field; Boise, ID	W 49–0
October 27	at Albion State Normal	Burley, ID	L 6–13
November 10	Idaho freshman^{†}	Public School Field; Boise, ID	W 6–0
November 24	Idaho Southern Branch	Public School Field; Boise, ID	L 6–25
November 29	at Gooding College	Gooding, ID	W 18–0
^{†}Homecoming

1935
Head coach: Max Eiden
Record: 4–4

Date	Opponent	Site	Result	Source
September 28	College of Idaho	Public School Field; Boise, ID	L 0–30	
October 5	at Gooding College	Gooding, ID	W 26–0	
October 18	Lewiston Normal	Public School Field; Boise, ID	W 21–0	
October 25	Gooding College	Public School Field; Boise, ID	W 19–0	
November 2	at Ricks	Rexburg, ID	L 6–7	
November 8	Eastern Oregon	Public School Field; Boise, ID	W 12–6	
November 16	at Idaho Southern Branch	Hutchinson Field; Pocatello, ID	L 6–19	
November 22	Albion State Normal^{†}	Public School Field; Boise, ID	L 6–7	
^{†}Homecoming

1936
Head coach: Max Eiden
Record: 3–4

Date	Time	Opponent	Site	Result	Source
October 2		Ricks	Public School Field; Boise, ID	W 19–13	
October 9		Gooding College	Public School Field; Boise, ID	W 26–6	
October 9	3:30 p.m.	at Lewiston Normal	Lewiston, ID	L 14–32	
October 16		Idaho freshmen	Public School Field; Boise, ID	W 2–0	
October 23		at Eastern Oregon	La Grande, OR	L 3–25	
October 31		College of Idaho	Public School Field; Boise, ID	L 0–25	
November 11		vs. Albion State Normal	Rupert, ID	L 0–7	
All times are in Mountain time

1937
Head coach: Max Eiden
Record: 0–6–1

Date	Time	Opponent	Site	Result	Attendance	Source
September 24	8:00 p.m.	Albion State Normal	Public School Field; Boise, ID	L 7–19		
October 1	8:00 p.m.	at Mesa (CO)	Lincoln Park; Grand Junction, CO	L 13–19	1,000	
October 8		Idaho Southern Branch	Public School Field; Boise, ID	L 0–45		
October 15		at Ricks	Rexburg, ID	T 0–0		
October 22	7:45 p.m.	at College of Idaho	Caldwell, ID	L 0–18		
October 30		Lewiston Normal^{†}	Public School Field; Boise, ID	L 6–24		
November 11	2:00 p.m.	Eastern Oregon	Public School Field; Boise, ID	L 7–25		
^{†}Homecoming; All times are in Mountain time

1938
Head coach: Harry Jacoby
Record: 2–4

Date	Opponent	Site	Result
October 1	at Eastern Oregon	La Grande, OR	L 0-35
October 8	at Albion State Normal	Albion, ID	L 0–14
October 15	at Idaho Southern Branch	Spud Bowl; Pocatello, ID	L 0–54
October 21	Idaho freshman	Public School Field; Boise, ID	L 7–14
November 5	Ricks^{†}	Public School Field; Boise, ID	W 19–7
November 19	Mesa (CO)	Public School Field; Boise, ID	W 19–0
^{†}Homecoming

1939
Head coach: Harry Jacoby
Record: 4–2

Date	Time	Opponent	Site	Result	Source
September 29	8:00 p.m.	Albion State Normal	Public School Field; Boise, ID	L 0–16	
October 6	8:00 p.m.	Eastern Oregon	Public School Field; Boise, ID	W 7–0	
October 13	8:00 p.m.	Boise All-Stars ^	Public School Field; Boise, ID	W 12–9	
October 28	8:00 p.m.	at College of Idaho	Simplot Stadium; Caldwell, ID	L 13–21	
November 4	2:00 p.m.	Ricks^{†}	Public School Field; Boise, ID	W 21–14	
November 11	12:00 p.m.	at Lewiston Normal	Lewiston, ID	W 20–7	
^{†}Homecoming; All times are in Mountain time

^ The Boise All-Stars were a team of former college players.

== 1940s ==
1940
Head coach: Harry Jacoby
Record: 4–2

Boise was ranked at No. 598 (out of 697 college football teams) in the final rankings under the Litkenhous Difference by Score system for 1940.

Date	Time	Opponent	Site	Result
September 27	8:00 p.m.	Carroll (MT)*	College Field; Boise, ID	W 14–7
October 4		at Eastern Oregon*	La Grande, OR	W 6–0
October 12		at Albion State Normal	Albion, ID	L 7–21
October 19		Carbon	College Field; Boise, ID	W 21–0
October 25	8:00 p.m.	College of Idaho*	College Field; Boise, ID	W 7–0
November 9	2:00 p.m.	Lewiston Normal*^{†}	College Field; Boise, ID	L 6–12
*Non-conference game; ^{†}Homecoming; All times are in Mountain time

1941
Head coaches: Harry Jacoby (first 4 games), George "Stub" Allison (last 3 games)
Record: 3–4

Date	Time	Opponent	Site	Result	Source
September 27		at Carroll (MT)	Helena, MT	L 0–6	
October 4	8:00 p.m.	Eastern Oregon	Chaffee Stadium; Boise, ID	L 0–7	
October 10	8:00 p.m.	Albion State Normal^{†}	Chaffee Stadium; Boise, ID	W 15–0	
October 18		at Lewiston Normal	Lewiston, ID	L 6–7	
October 24	8:00 p.m.	Idaho Southern Branch	Chaffee Stadium; Boise, ID	L 0–34	
November 1		at Carbon	Price, UT	W 25–6	
November 11		Gowen Field	Chaffee Stadium; Boise, ID	W 14–6	
^{†}Homecoming; All times are in Mountain time

Boise Junior College fielded no varsity team from 1942 to 1945 due to World War II.

1946
Head coach: Harry Jacoby
Record: 3–4–2

Date	Time	Opponent	Site	Result	Source
September 27	8:00 p.m.	Albion State Normal	College Field; Boise, ID	L 0–7	
October 4		at Weber	Ogden, UT	T 0–0	
October 11	8:00 p.m.	Lewiston Normal	College Field; Boise, ID	W 7–6	
October 19		at Idaho Southern Branch	Spud Bowl; Pocatello, ID	L 0–6	
October 25	8:00 p.m.	Idaho junior varsity	College Field; Boise, ID	L 7–12	
November 1		at Carbon	Price, UT	L 7–13	
November 9	2:00 p.m.	Eastern Oregon	College Field; Boise, ID	W 19–0	
November 16		at Albion State Normal	Albion, ID	T 7–7	
November 23	2:00 p.m.	College of Idaho^{†}	College Field; Boise, ID	W 20–6	
^{†}Homecoming; All times are in Mountain time

1947
Head coach: Lyle Smith
Record: 9–0

In the final Litkenhous Ratings released in mid-December, Boise Junior College was ranked at No. 393 out of 500 college football teams.

Date	Time	Opponent	Site	Result	Source
September 26		at Ricks	Rexburg, ID	W 31–0	
October 3		Carbon	College Field; Boise, ID	W 28–7	
October 10	8:15 p.m.	SICE	College Field; Boise, ID	W 12–0	
October 18	9:00 p.m.	at NICE	Adams Field; Clarkston, WA	W 27–13	
October 25	2:00 p.m.	Idaho freshmen^{†}	College Field; Boise, ID	W 19–12	
October 31	8:00 p.m.	Weber	College Field; Boise, ID	W 13–7	
November 8		at Eastern Oregon	La Grande, OR	W 14–0	
November 15		at Olympic	Bremerton, WA	W 33–6	
November 22		vs. SICE	Glenns Ferry, ID	W 7–0	
^{†}Homecoming; All times are in Mountain time

1948
Head coach: Lyle Smith
Record: 9–0^

Date	Time	Opponent	Site	Result	Source
September 25		at Olympic*	Bremerton, WA	W 33–12	
October 1	8:00 p.m.	Ricks	College Field; Boise, ID	W 25–0	
October 8	8:00 p.m.	Utah State freshmen*	College Field; Boise, ID	W 13–7	
October 14	8:00 p.m.	at Weber	Ogden, UT	W 12–0	
October 22	2:00 p.m.	Idaho freshmen*	College Field; Boise, ID	W 25–13	
October 30	2:00 p.m.	NICE*^{†}	College Field; Boise, ID	W 33–13	
November 5	8:00 p.m.	vs. SICE	Lincoln Field; Jerome, ID	W 13–12	
November 13	2:00 p.m.	Eastern Oregon*	College Field; Boise, ID	W 29–14	
November 25		at Yakima Valley*	Yakima, WA	W 52–0	
*Non-conference game; ^{†}Homecoming; All times are in Mountain time

^Boise State was undefeated in ICAC league play, but did not play enough conference opponents to be eligible for the conference championship.

1949
Head coach: Lyle Smith
Record: 10–0
ICAC champion
Potato Bowl champion (Bakersfield, CA)

Date	Time	Opponent	Site	Result	Source
September 23		Yakima Valley*	College Field; Boise, ID	W 44–7	
October 1	9:00 p.m.	at NICE*	Bengal Field; Lewiston, ID	W 26–13	
October 8		at Ricks	Rexburg, ID	W 13–0	
October 14		Branch Agricultural College	College Field; Boise, ID	W 62–12	
October 21		Weber	College Field; Boise, ID	W 20–7	
October 28		SICE	College Field; Boise, ID	W 19–0	
November 5		at Carbon	Price, UT	W 19–7	
November 12		at Eastern Oregon*	La Grande, OR	W 48–13	
November 19		Lassen*^{†}	College Field; Boise, ID	W 50–6	
December 3		vs. Taft*	Memorial Stadium; Bakersfield, CA (Potato Bowl)	W 25–6	
*Non-conference game; ^{†}Homecoming; All times are in Mountain time

== 1950s ==
1950
Head coaches: Lyle Smith (first three games), George Blankley (last seven games)
Record: 9–1
ICAC champions

Date	Time	Opponent	Site	Result	Attendance	Source
September 22	8:00 p.m.	Modesto*	Bronco Stadium; Boise, ID	W 33–13		
September 29	8:00 p.m.	at Weber	Ogden Stadium; Ogden, UT	W 8–0		
October 7	8:00 p.m.	Ricks	Bronco Stadium; Boise, ID	W 52–13		
October 14		at Oregon Tech*	Klamath Falls, OR	W 53–6		
October 21		vs. SICE	Lincoln Field; Jerome, ID	W 21–7		
October 27	8:00 p.m.	NICE*	Bronco Stadium; Boise, ID	W 26–18		
November 4	8:00 p.m.	Carbon	Bronco Stadium; Boise, ID	W 41–6		
November 10	2:00 p.m.	Eastern Oregon*^{†}	Bronco Stadium; Boise, ID	W 48–13		
November 18	2:30 p.m.	at Westminster (UT)	Hansen Stadium; Salt Lake City, UT	W 33–6		
December 9	3:00 p.m.	vs. Long Beach*	Rose Bowl; Pasadena, CA (Junior Rose Bowl)	L 13–33	47,525	
*Non-conference game; ^{†}Homecoming; All times are in Mountain time

1951
Head coach: George Blankley
Record: 10–1
ICAC champions
Potato Bowl champions

Date	Time	Opponent	Site	Result
September 22	8:00 p.m.	Muir*	Bronco Stadium; Boise, ID	W 33–13
September 29		at Olympic*	Bremerton, WA	L 6–18
October 6		at Ricks	Rexburg, ID	W 39–0
October 12	8:00 p.m.	Oregon Tech*	Bronco Stadium; Boise, ID	W 14–6
October 20	8:00 p.m.	Weber	Bronco Stadium; Boise, ID	W 13–12
October 27	8:00 p.m.	Chaffey*	Bronco Stadium; Boise, ID	W 46–6
November 3	2:00 p.m.	Westminster (UT)^{†}	Bronco Stadium; Boise, ID	W 34–13
November 10		at Carbon	Price, UT	W 56–0
November 17	2:00 p.m.	Orange Coast*	Bronco Stadium; Boise, ID	W 35–19
November 24	2:10 p.m.	Mountain Home AFB*	Bronco Stadium; Boise, ID	W 53–13
December 1		at Bakersfield*	Memorial Stadium; Bakersfield, CA (Potato Bowl)	W 34–13
*Non-conference game; ^{†}Homecoming; All times are in Mountain time

1952
Head coach: Lyle Smith
Record: 8–1
ICAC champion

Date	Time	Opponent	Site	Result
September 26	8:15 p.m.	Olympic*	Bronco Stadium; Boise, ID	W 35–12
October 3	8:00 p.m.	at Weber	Ogden, UT	W 33–14
October 11	8:15 p.m.	Utah State freshmen*^{†}	Bronco Stadium; Boise, ID	W 39–0
October 18	2:00 p.m.	at Westminster (UT)	Salt Lake City, UT	W 47–7
October 25	9:00 p.m.	at Chaffey*	Ontario, CA	W 71–13
November 1	9:00 p.m.	at Oregon Tech*	Klamath Falls, OR	W 14–13
November 8	2:15 p.m.	Ricks	Bronco Stadium; Boise, ID	W 57–0
November 15	2:15 p.m.	Idaho freshmen*	Bronco Stadium; Boise, ID	W 34–7
November 22	2:15 p.m.	Pasadena*	Bronco Stadium; Boise, ID (Bronco Bowl)	L 13–28
*Non-conference game; ^{†}Homecoming; All times are in Mountain time

1953
Head coach: Lyle Smith
Record: 8–1
ICAC champion
Bronco Bowl champion

Date	Opponent	Site	Result
September 26	Everett*	Bronco Stadium; Boise, ID	W 19–13
October 3	Yakima Valley*	Yakima, WA	W 33–0
October 10	at Olympic*	Bremerton, WA	W 6–0
October 17	at Westminster (UT)	Salt Lake City, UT	W 26–7
October 24	Weber	Bronco Stadium; Boise, ID	W 22–6
October 31	Oregon Tech*	Bronco Stadium; Boise, ID	W 22–0
November 6	at Ricks	Rexburg, ID	W 13–0
November 14	Bacone*^{†}	Bronco Stadium; Boise, ID (Bronco Bowl)	W 36–14
November 19	at Pasadena Lancers football*	Pasadena, CA	L 0–6
*Non-conference game; ^{†}Homecoming

1954
Head coach: Lyle Smith
Record: 9–1–1
ICAC champion

Date	Time	Opponent	Site	Result
September 18		Oregon Tech*	Bronco Stadium; Boise, ID	W 35–7
September 25		Olympic*	Bronco Stadium; Boise, ID	W 28–6
October 2		at Yakima Valley*	Yakima, WA	W 26–0
October 9		at Weber	Ogden, UT	W 47–6
October 16		at Everett*	Everett, WA	W 26–19
October 23		Snow	Bronco Stadium; Boise, ID	W 45–0
October 30		Southern Utah	Bronco Stadium; Boise, ID	W 40–7
November 6		Ricks	Bronco Stadium; Boise, ID	T 26–26
November 13	2:15 p.m.	Pasadena*^{†}	Bronco Stadium; Boise, ID	W 20–7
November 20		at Centralia*	Centralia, WA	W 34–14
December 4		vs. Compton*	Memorial Stadium; Bakersfield, CA (Potato Bowl)	L 6–7
*Non-conference game; ^{†}Homecoming; All times are in Mountain time

1955
Head coach: Lyle Smith
Record: 7–2
ICAC champion

Date	Time	Opponent	Site	Result
September 23		at Carbon	Price, UT	W 46–0
October 1		Olympic*	Bronco Stadium; Boise, ID	W 26–12
October 8		San Jose City*	Bronco Stadium; Boise, ID	W 15–6
October 15	8:30 p.m.	at Oregon Tech*	Klamath Falls, OR	W 50–0
October 22		Weber	Bronco Stadium; Boise, ID	W 25–18
October 29		at Centralia*	Centralia, WA	W 20–0
November 4		at Ricks	Rexburg, ID	W 32–0
November 12		Everett*^{†}	Bronco Stadium; Boise, ID	L 20–21
November 18		at Pasadena Lancers football*	Pasadena, CA	L 19–45
*Non-conference game; ^{†}Homecoming; All times are in Mountain time

1956
Head coach: Lyle Smith
Record: 8–0–1
ICAC co-champion

Date	Time	Opponent	Site	Result
September 22		Carbon	Bronco Stadium; Boise, ID	W 36–0
September 29		at Yuba*	Marysville, CA	W 21–14
October 5		at Weber	Ogden, UT	W 33–6
October 12		Hartnell*	Bronco Stadium; Boise, ID	T 20–20
October 20		Utah State freshmen*	Bronco Stadium; Boise, ID	W 34–20
October 27		at Southern Utah	Cedar City, UT	W 47–0
November 3		Ricks	Bronco Stadium; Boise, ID	W 61–0
November 10		at Everett*	Everett, WA	W 41–27
November 17	2:15 p.m.	Wenatchee Valley*^{†}	Bronco Stadium; Boise, ID	W 59–6
*Non-conference game; ^{†}Homecoming; All times are in Mountain time

1957
Head coach: Lyle Smith
Record: 9–1
ICAC champion

Date	Time	Opponent	Site	Result
September 21	8:00 p.m.	at Carbon	Price, UT	W 13–6
September 28	8:15 p.m.	Oregon Tech*	Bronco Stadium; Boise, ID	W 32–19
October 4	8:00 p.m.	at Dixie (UT)	St. George, UT (ppd. to Nov 23)	
October 12	8:15 p.m.	Weber^{†}	Bronco Stadium; Boise, ID	W 52–7
October 19	8:15 p.m.	Utah State freshmen*	Bronco Stadium; Boise, ID	W 46–0
October 26	8:15 p.m.	Southern Utah	Bronco Stadium; Boise, ID	W 53–0
November 1		at Ricks	Rexburg, ID	W 40–12
November 9	2:15 p.m.	Everett*	Bronco Stadium; Boise, ID	W 34–13
November 16	2:15 p.m.	Scottsbluff*	Bronco Stadium; Boise, ID	W 45–0
November 23		at Dixie (UT)	St. George, UT	W 39–13
December 7		at Bakersfield*	Memorial Stadium; Bakersfield, CA (Potato Bowl)	L 13–28
*Non-conference game; ^{†}Homecoming; All times are in Mountain time

1958
Head coach: Lyle Smith
Record: 10–0
ICAC champions
NJCAA National Champion

Date	Time	Opponent	Site	Result
September 20	8:15 p.m.	Carbon	Bronco Stadium; Boise, ID	W 51–0
September 27	8:15 p.m.	Oakland City*	Bronco Stadium; Boise, ID	W 40–0
October 3	8:00 p.m.	at Weber	Ogden, UT	W 49–7
October 18	8:15 p.m.	Olympic*	Bronco Stadium; Boise, ID	W 44–19
October 25	8:15 p.m.	Trinidad*^{†}	Bronco Stadium; Boise, ID	W 55–0
November 1	2:00 p.m.	at Compton*	Compton, CA	W 21–8
November 8	8:30 p.m.	at Everett*	Everett, WA	W 29–20
November 15	2:15 p.m.	Ricks	Bronco Stadium; Boise, ID	W 25–7
November 22	2:15 p.m.	Dixie (UT)	Bronco Stadium; Boise, ID	W 75–6
November 27		Tyler*	Bronco Stadium; Boise, ID (NJCAA Championship Game)	W 22–0
*Non-conference game; ^{†}Homecoming; All times are in Mountain time

1959
Head coach: Lyle Smith
Record: 7–2–1

Date	Time	Opponent	Site	Result
September 19	8:15 p.m.	Santa Monica*	Bronco Stadium; Boise, ID	L 19–46
September 26		at Snow	Ephraim, UT	W 26–0
October 3	8:15 p.m.	Weber	Bronco Stadium; Boise, ID	W 20–13
October 10		at Carbon	Price, UT	L 7–13
October 17		at Grand Rapids*	Grand Rapids, MI	T 20–20
October 24	8:15 p.m.	Hartnell*	Bronco Stadium; Boise, ID	W 20–13
October 31	2:15 p.m.	Ricks^{†}	Bronco Stadium; Boise, ID	W 40–7
November 6	2:15 p.m.	Everett*	Bronco Stadium; Boise, ID	W 32–14
November 14		at Olympic*	Bremerton, WA	W 12–6
November 21	2:15 p.m.	Otero*	Bronco Stadium; Boise, ID	W 20–7
*Non-conference game; ^{†}Homecoming; All times are in Mountain time

== 1960s ==
1960
Head coach: Lyle Smith
Record: 8–2
ICAC champion

Date	Time	Opponent	Site	Result
September 17	8:15 p.m.	Dixie (UT)	Bronco Stadium; Boise, ID	W 48–6
September 24	8:15 p.m.	Olympic*	Bronco Stadium; Boise, ID	W 33–0
October 1	9:00 p.m.	at Santa Monica*	Santa Monica, CA	L 7–26
October 7	8:15 p.m.	Carbon	Bronco Stadium; Boise, ID	W 54–0
October 15	8:00 p.m.	at Weber	Ogden, UT	W 26–24
October 22	8:15 p.m.	Eastern Arizona*^{†}	Bronco Stadium; Boise, ID	W 68–14
October 29	2:00 p.m.	at Southern Utah	Cedar City, UT	W 47–7
November 5	1:30 p.m.	at Ricks	Rexburg, ID	W 59–7
November 19	2:15 p.m.	Grand Rapids*	Bronco Stadium; Boise, ID	W 61–20
November 24	9:00 p.m.	at Everett*	Everett, WA	L 13–14
*Non-conference game; ^{†}Homecoming; All times are in Mountain time

1961
Head coach: Lyle Smith
Record: 9–1
ICAC champion

Date	Time	Opponent	Site	Result
September 16		at Snow	Ephraim, UT	W 37–0
September 23	8:15 p.m.	El Camino*	Bronco Stadium; Boise, ID	W 70–20
September 30		at Olympic*	Bremerton, WA	W 10–0
October 7		at Carbon	Price, UT	W 50–19
October 14	8:15 p.m.	Weber	Bronco Stadium; Boise, ID	W 15–0
October 21	8:15 p.m.	Everett*^{†}	Bronco Stadium; Boise, ID	W 14–13
October 28	8:15 p.m.	Southern Utah	Bronco Stadium; Boise, ID	W 57–0
November 5	2:15 p.m.	Ricks	Bronco Stadium; Boise, ID	W 56–0
November 19		at Dixie (UT)	St. George, UT	W 29–7
November 26		at New Mexico Military*	Roswell, NM	L 21–24
*Non-conference game; ^{†}Homecoming; All times are in Mountain time

1962
Head coach: Lyle Smith
Record: 5–2–2

Date	Time	Opponent	Site	Result
September 22		at El Camino*	Alondra Park, CA	L 6–38
September 29	8:15 p.m.	Olympic*	Bronco Stadium; Boise, ID	T 6–6
October 6	8:15 p.m.	Carbon	Bronco Stadium; Boise, ID	W 34–0
October 13		at Snow	Ephraim, UT	L 8–12
October 20		at Everett*	Everett, WA	T 7–7
October 27	8:15 p.m.	Dixie (UT)^{†}	Bronco Stadium; Boise, ID	W 20–19
November 3		at Ricks	Rexburg, ID	W 23–14
November 10	2:15 p.m.	Yakima Valley*	Bronco Stadium; Boise, ID	W 35–14
November 17	2:15 p.m.	New Mexico Military*	Bronco Stadium; Boise, ID	W 26–6
*Non-conference game; ^{†}Homecoming; All times are in Mountain time

1963
Head coach: Lyle Smith
Record: 5–3–1

Date	Time	Opponent	Site	Result
September 21	8:15 p.m.	Columbia Basin*	Bronco Stadium; Boise, ID	T 13–13
September 27	8:00 p.m.	at Mesa (CO)	Grand Junction, CO	L 6–7
October 5	8:00 p.m.	at Carbon	Price, UT	W 27-0
October 12	8:15 p.m.	Snow	Bronco Stadium; Boise, ID	W 21–7
October 19	8:15 p.m.	Everett*	Bronco Stadium; Boise, ID	W 40–12
October 26	8:00 p.m.	at Dixie (UT)	St. George, UT	L 7–12
November 2	2:15 p.m.	Ricks^{†}	Bronco Stadium; Boise, ID	W 27–14
November 9	2:30 p.m.	at Yakima Valley*	Yakima, WA	L 13–33
November 16	2:15 p.m.	McCook*	Bronco Stadium; Boise, ID	W 20–0
*Non-conference game; ^{†}Homecoming; All times are in Mountain time

1964
Head coach: Lyle Smith
Record: 8–2

Date	Time	Opponent	Site	TV	Result	Source
September 19		at Columbia Basin*	Pasco, WA		L 2–21	
September 26	8:15 p.m.	Mesa (CO)	Bronco Stadium; Boise, ID		W 41–7	
October 3	8:15 p.m.	Northwest*	Bronco Stadium; Boise, ID		W 41–0	
October 10		at Snow	Ephraim, UT		W 27–8	
October 17	8:15 p.m.	Idaho freshmen*^{†}	Bronco Stadium; Boise, ID		W 33–10	
October 24	8:15 p.m.	Dixie (UT)	Bronco Stadium; Boise, ID		L 2–7	
October 31		at Ricks	Rexburg, ID		W 34–0	
November 7	2:15 p.m.	Shoreline*	Bronco Stadium; Boise, ID		W 47–19	
November 14		at Everett*	Everett, WA		W 26–7	
November 27	7:00 p.m.	at Compton*	City College Stadium; Pasadena, CA	KCOP	W 39–26	
*Non-conference game; ^{†}Homecoming; All times are in Mountain time

1965
Head coach: Lyle Smith
Record: 9–2
ICAC champion

Date	Time	Opponent	Site	Result
September 18	8:15 p.m.	Columbia Basin*	Bronco Stadium; Boise, ID	L 0–26
September 25	8:00 p.m.	at Treasure Valley*	Ontario, OR	W 36–13
October 2	8:15 p.m.	Snow	Bronco Stadium; Boise, ID	W 28–20
October 9	8:15 p.m.	Wenatchee Valley*	Bronco Stadium; Boise, ID	W 21–7
October 16	7:30 p.m.	at Mesa (CO)	Grand Junction, CO	W 55–0
October 23	2:15 p.m.	at Dixie (UT)	St. George, UT	W 21–13
October 30	2:15 p.m.	Shoreline*^{†}	Bronco Stadium; Boise, ID	W 37–0
November 6	2:15 p.m.	Ricks	Bronco Stadium; Boise, ID	W 27–13
November 13	7:30 p.m.	at Everett*	Everett, WA	W 13–7
November 20	8:00 p.m.	at Taft*	Taft, CA	W 21–20
December 4		vs. Cerritos*	Memorial Stadium; Bakersfield, CA (Potato Bowl)	L 13–41
*Non-conference game; ^{†}Homecoming; All times are in Mountain time

1966
Head coach: Lyle Smith
Record: 9–1
ICAC champion

Date	Time	Opponent	Site	Result
September 17		at Columbia Basin*	Pasco, WA	W 13–9
September 24	8:15 p.m.	Everett*	Bronco Stadium; Boise, ID	W 14–0
October 1		at Snow	Ephraim, UT	W 35–7
October 8		at Treasure Valley*	Ontario, OR	W 54–7
October 15	8:15 p.m.	Mesa (CO)^{†}	Bronco Stadium; Boise, ID	W 35–14
October 22	8:15 p.m.	Dixie (UT)	Bronco Stadium; Boise, ID	W 21–13
October 29		at Ricks	Rexburg, ID	W 38–20
November 5		at Shoreline*	Shoreline, WA	W 14–7
November 12	2:15 p.m.	Yakima Valley*	Bronco Stadium; Boise, ID	W 25–7
November 19	2:15 p.m.	Taft*	Bronco Stadium; Boise, ID	L 5–45
*Non-conference game; ^{†}Homecoming; All times are in Mountain time

1967
Head coach: Lyle Smith
Record: 6–4

Date	Time	Opponent	Site	Result	Source
September 16		Columbia Basin*	Bronco Stadium; Boise, ID	W 25–12	
September 23		at Everett*	Everett, WA	W 29–21	
September 30		Snow	Bronco Stadium; Boise, ID	W 35–6	
October 7		Treasure Valley*	Bronco Stadium; Boise, ID	L 23–26	
October 14		at Mesa (CO)	Grand Junction, CO	L 14–25	
October 21		at Dixie (UT)	St. George, UT	W 7–3	
October 28		Ricks^{†}	Bronco Stadium; Boise, ID	L 14–18	
November 4	2:15 p.m.	San Diego City*	Bronco Stadium; Boise, ID	L 21–44	
November 11		at Yakima Valley*	Yakima, WA	W 36–6	
November 18		Wenatchee Valley*	Bronco Stadium; Boise, ID	W 35–7	
*Non-conference game; ^{†}Homecoming; All times are in Mountain time
