= George Allison (coach) =

American football and basketball coach, athletic administrator

Coaching career (HC unless noted)

Football
- 1941: Boise

Basketball
- 1941–1942: Boise

Head coaching record
- Overall: 2–1 (football); 17–14 (basketball)

George "Stub" Allison was an American coach of American football and basketball and an athletics administrator. He served as interim head football coach at Boise Junior College—now Boise State University—following Harry Jacoby being called into active duty in the United States Army midway through the 1941 season. Allison compiled a 2–1 record as the coach of the Broncos. He also filled in for Jacoby as head coach of the BJC men's basketball team for the 1941–42 season, compiling a 17–14 record. In addition to these two roles, Allison was the athletic director of BJC in this period (again replacing Jacoby in that role).

Prior to arriving in Boise, Allison was a coach at Baker High School in Oregon.

== Head coaching record ==
=== Football ===
Year	Team	Overall	Conference	Standing	Bowl/playoffs
Boise Broncos () (1941)
1941	Boise	2–1			
Boise:		2–1			
Total:		2–1			
