= Boise State–Washington State football rivalry =

American college football rivalry

Boise State–Washington State football rivalry Snake River Rivalry
- Boise State Broncos Washington State Cougars
- Sport: College football
- First meeting: September 27, 1997; Washington State, 58–0
- Latest meeting: October 24, 2026; Boise State, 31–10
- Stadiums: Albertsons Stadium; Martin Stadium

Statistics
- Total meetings: 8
- All-time series: Washington State leads, 5–3 (.625)
- Largest victory: Washington State, 58–0 (1997)
- Longest win streak: Washington State, 4 (1997–2001)
- Current win streak: Boise State, 2 (2024–present)

Locations of Boise State and Washington State

The Boise State–Washington State football rivalry, sometimes referred to as the Snake River Rivalry, is an American college football rivalry between the Boise State Broncos of Boise State University and the Washington State Cougars of Washington State University. The schools are regional opponents in the Northwestern United States and are members of the Pac-12 Conference.

The term "Snake River Rivalry" has been used in regional media in connection with the series. Ahead of the teams' 2024 meeting, the Idaho Statesman used the name while discussing the possibility of Boise State and Washington State developing a regional rivalry. Interest in the matchup increased after Boise State accepted an invitation in 2024 to join Washington State in the rebuilt Pac-12 beginning in 2026. The schools played their first game as Pac-12 opponents in 2026.

Washington State leads the all-time series 5–3. Boise State has won the two most recent meetings.

== History ==
=== Early meetings ===
The programs first met on September 27, 1997, at Martin Stadium in Pullman, Washington. No. 15 Washington State defeated Boise State 58–0, the largest margin in the series. The game occurred during Washington State's 1997 Rose Bowl season and remains the largest defeat in Boise State program history.

The teams met again the following season in Boise, with Washington State overcoming a halftime deficit to win 33–21. After a one-year break, the Cougars won 42–35 in Pullman in 2000. Washington State completed a four-game winning streak to open the series with a 41–20 victory at Boise State in 2001. The loss ended a 14-game Boise State home winning streak.

=== 2016 and 2017 ===
The series resumed in 2016 after a 15-year hiatus. Boise State earned its first victory over Washington State with a 31–28 win at Albertsons Stadium. Boise State's Tyler Horton returned an interception 85 yards for a touchdown, while running back Jeremy McNichols rushed for 116 yards and two touchdowns. Washington State quarterback Luke Falk threw for 480 yards and four touchdowns as the Cougars' late comeback fell short.

The following season produced the closest game in series history. No. 20 Washington State trailed Boise State 31–10 in the fourth quarter before backup quarterback Tyler Hilinski helped lead a 21-point comeback. Washington State tied the game late in regulation and eventually won 47–44 in triple overtime when Hilinski completed a 22-yard touchdown pass to Jamal Morrow. Hilinski finished 25 of 33 for 240 yards after entering the game as a reserve.

=== Emergence as a regional rivalry ===
The series resumed in 2024 during a period of conference realignment. Less than three weeks before the game, Boise State accepted an invitation to join Oregon State and Washington State in a rebuilt Pac-12 beginning with the 2026–27 academic year.

Ahead of the game, the Idaho Statesman described Washington State as a possible new regional rival for Boise State and used the term "Snake River Rivalry" in its coverage. Boise State head coach Spencer Danielson cited the programs' regional proximity and overlapping fan and recruiting areas when discussing the potential rivalry.

On September 28, 2024, No. 25 Boise State defeated Washington State 45–24 at Albertsons Stadium. Ashton Jeanty rushed for 259 yards and four touchdowns as the Broncos pulled away in the fourth quarter.

Boise State officially became a member of the Pac-12 on July 1, 2026, joining Washington State, Oregon State and the conference's other new members. Coverage before the 2026 meeting characterized Boise State–Washington State as a developing regional rivalry between schools less than 300 miles apart.

The teams met as conference opponents for the first time on October 24, 2026, in Pullman. With the score tied 10–10 entering the fourth quarter, No. 21 Boise State scored 21 unanswered points to win 31–10. Running back Dylan Riley rushed for 128 yards and two touchdowns, scoring on fourth-quarter runs of 33 and 72 yards. It was Boise State's first victory in Pullman and gave the Broncos consecutive victories in the series for the first time.

== Game results ==
Boise State victories	Washington State victories

No.	Date	Location	Winning team		Losing team	
1	September 27, 1997	Pullman, Washington	No. 15 Washington State	58	Boise State	0
2	September 12, 1998	Boise, Idaho	Washington State	33	Boise State	21
3	October 7, 2000	Pullman, Washington	Washington State	42	Boise State	35
4	September 8, 2001	Boise, Idaho	Washington State	41	Boise State	20
5	September 10, 2016	Boise, Idaho	Boise State	31	Washington State	28
6	September 9, 2017	Pullman, Washington	No. 20 Washington State	47	Boise State	44^{3OT}
7	September 28, 2024	Boise, Idaho	No. 25 Boise State	45	Washington State	24
8	October 24, 2026	Pullman, Washington	No. 21 Boise State	31	Washington State	10
Series: Washington State leads 5–3
Rankings are from the AP Poll released prior to the game.

== See also ==
- List of NCAA college football rivalry games
- Boise State–Fresno State football rivalry
- Boise State–Idaho football rivalry
- Apple Cup
- Battle of the Palouse
