= Dusty Kline =

American football coach (1898–1966)

Biographical details
- Born: January 18, 1898; Plainfield, New Jersey, U.S.
- Died: September 12, 1966 (aged 68); Portland, Oregon, U.S.

Playing career
- 1922–1925: Idaho
- Position: Center

Coaching career (HC unless noted)
- 1929: Rupert HS (ID)
- 1933: Boise
- 1934: Boise HS (ID)
- 1944: Baker HS (OR)

Head coaching record
- Overall: 1–2–1 (junior college)

Morris William "Dusty" Kline (January 18, 1898 – September 12, 1966) was an American football player and coach. He served as the first head football coach at Boise Junior College—now Boise State University—coaching one season in 1933 and compiling a record of 1–2–1.

A native of Plainfield, New Jersey, Kline played college football at the University of Idaho as a center. In 1929, Kline was coaching football at Rupert High School in Rupert, Idaho. In 1934, he was coaching at Boise High School. Kline moved to Baker, Oregon in 1943 to become a purchasing agent for Baker War Industries, Inc. A year later, he was hired as football coach at Baker High School.

Kline entered the real estate business in the 1950s. He died on September 12, 1966, at a hospital in Portland, Oregon.

== Head coaching record ==
=== Junior college ===
Year	Team	Overall	Conference	Standing	Bowl/playoffs
Boise Broncos () (1933)
1933	Boise	1–2–1			
Boise:		1–2–1			
Total:		1–2–1			
