= Harry Jacoby =

American sports coach and administrator (1910–1993)

Biographical details
- Born: September 2, 1910
- Died: November 9, 1993 (aged 83)

Playing career

Football
- 1932–1934: Idaho
- Position: Halfback

Coaching career (HC unless noted)

Football
- 1934–1935: Soda Springs HS (ID)
- 1937: Idaho (assistant)
- 1938–1941: Boise
- 1946: Boise

Basketball
- 1934–1936: Soda Springs HS (ID)
- 1939–1941: Boise

Head coaching record
- Overall: 14–15–2 (football); 24–21 (basketball)

Harry Joseph Jacoby (September 2, 1910 – November 9, 1993) was an American football and basketball coach and athletics administrator. He served as the third head football coach at Boise Junior College—now Boise State University—coaching in five seasons. His first tenure lasted from 1938 through the first four games of 1941, when he was called by the United States Army for active duty at Fort Warren, Wyoming. The final three games in 1941 were coached by George "Stub" Allison, who also took over athletic director duties. After World War II ended, Jacoby resumed coaching duties for the Broncos in 1946. He compiled an overall record of 14–15–2. Jacoby was also the head basketball coach at Boise Junior College for two seasons, from 1939–40 to 1940–41, tallying a mark of 24–21.

A native of Bonners Ferry, Idaho, Jacoby played college football at the University of Idaho. He coached at Soda Springs High School in Soda Springs, Idaho and then returned to Idaho as an assistant to Ted Bank.

== Head coaching record ==
=== Football ===
Year	Team	Overall	Conference	Standing	Bowl/playoffs
Boise Broncos (Independent) (1938–1939)
1938	Boise	2–4			
1939	Boise	4–2			
Boise Broncos (Intermountain Junior College Conference) (1940)
1940	Boise	4–2	1–1	T–4th	
Boise Broncos (Independent) (1941)
1941	Boise	1–3			
Boise Broncos (Independent) (1946)
1946	Boise	3–4–2			
Boise:		14–15–2	1–1		
Total:		14–15–2			
