= Steve Belko =

American basketball coach (1916–2000)

- Wickiup 1951, Idaho State College yearbook

Biographical details
- Born: February 14, 1916; Gary, Indiana, U.S.
- Died: May 12, 2000 (aged 84); Boise, Idaho, U.S.

Playing career
- 1936–1939: Idaho (football, basketball)
- Positions: Back (football); Guard, forward (basketball)

Coaching career (HC unless noted)
- 1939–1940: St. Maries HS (ID)
- 1940–1943: Lewiston HS (ID)
- 1946–1950: Idaho (assistant)
- 1950–1956: Idaho State
- 1956–1971: Oregon

Administrative career (AD unless noted)
- 1971–1972: Oregon (assistant AD)
- 1972–1975: Far West Classic (director)
- 1975–1977: Big Sky (evaluator)
- 1977–1981: Big Sky (commissioner)

Head coaching record
- Overall: 288–262 (college)

Accomplishments and honors

Championships
- 4 RMC (1953–1956)

Awards
- 3× RMC Coach of the Year

Records
- Military career
- Allegiance: United States
- Branch: United States Navy
- Service years: 1942–1945
- Conflicts: World War II

Stephen Maxmillian Belko (February 14, 1916 – May 12, 2000) was an American college basketball coach at Idaho State College and the University of Oregon. He was later the third commissioner of the Big Sky Conference.

== Playing career ==
The son of Russian immigrants, Belko was born in Gary, Indiana, and graduated from Froebel High School. He attended Compton Junior College in southern California for a year, with plans to play basketball at USC, where his older brother Max (1914–44) starred in football. When the assistant basketball coach at USC that recruited him got the head job at Idaho, also a member of the Pacific Coast Conference, Belko followed Forrest Twogood north in 1936 and hitchhiked over a thousand miles (1600 km) to Moscow.

A two-sport athlete for the Vandals, he was a guard and small forward in basketball and a halfback and quarterback on the football team, and a teammate of future coaches Lyle Smith and Tony Knap. As seniors in 1938, they led the Vandals to a 6–3–1 (.650) record, Idaho's best in years and the last winning season for a quarter century.

Belko opted not to play baseball, though he considered it his best sport. A member of the Sigma Chi fraternity and senior class president, he earned a bachelor's degree in education in 1939.

== Coaching career ==
Following his graduation from Idaho in 1939, Belko was a high school coach in northern Idaho at St. Maries for a season and for three at Lewiston, then served in the U.S. Navy in World War II as a Russian interpreter. Following his military service, Belko briefly returned to Lewiston, then moved to the University of Idaho in Moscow and coached the Vandal freshman teams in football and basketball.

=== Idaho State ===
In 1950, Belko was hired as the head basketball coach at Idaho State College in Pocatello, which became a four-year school in 1947. His Bengals soon dominated the Rocky Mountain Athletic Conference and made the NCAA tournament in four consecutive seasons (1953–56). The NCAA tournament field varied from 22 to 25 teams in the mid-1950s.

Belko's six-season record at Idaho State was 109–51 (.681), and he was named the conference coach of the year three times. The Bengals' conference record in his last four seasons was 39–3 (.929). This success led to his hiring in June 1956 at Oregon, then a member of the Pacific Coast Conference.

=== Oregon ===
Belko was the head coach of the Ducks for fifteen seasons and posted a 179–211 (.459) record, with a 44–102 (.301) record in conference play. His teams made the NCAA tournament twice, in 1960 and 1961, as an independent. The 1960 team advanced to the Western regional finals, the national quarterfinals (Elite 8). After five years as an independent, Oregon joined the Pacific-8 Conference (then "AAWU") for the 1964–65 season. In February 1970, the Ducks upset three-time defending national champion UCLA at McArthur Court in Eugene, winning 78–65 to snap the Bruins' 25-game winning streak.

Following a pair of 17–9 seasons, Belko stepped down in April 1971 at age 55 and remained in Eugene as the assistant athletic director at Oregon.

== Administrative career ==
After a year as assistant athletic director, Belko left the Oregon athletic department in 1972 to direct the Far West Classic basketball tournament in Portland for three years. In 1975, he moved to Boise to work for the Big Sky Conference as an evaluator of basketball officials. Belko was named commissioner of the conference in December 1976 and served from 1977 to 1981.

== Head coaching record ==
=== College ===
Record table
Season	Team	Overall	Conference	Standing	Postseason
Idaho State Bengals (Rocky Mountain Athletic Conference) (1950–1956)
1950–51	Idaho State	17–12	5–5	4th	
1951–52	Idaho State	16–11	6–4	3rd	
1952–53	Idaho State	18–7	10–0	1st	NCAA first round
1953–54	Idaho State	22–5	9–1	1st	NCAA first round
1954–55	Idaho State	18–8	9–1	1st	NCAA first round
1955–56	Idaho State	18–8	11–1	1st	NCAA first round
Idaho State:		109–51	50–12		
Oregon Webfoots (Pacific Coast Conference) (1956–1959)
1956–57	Oregon	4–21	2–14	9th	
1957–58	Oregon	13–11	6–10	7th	
1958–59	Oregon	9–16	3–13	T–8th	
Oregon Webfoots (Independent) (1959–1964)
1959–60	Oregon	19–10			NCAA Elite 8
1960–61	Oregon	15–12			NCAA first round
1961–62	Oregon	9–17			
1962–63	Oregon	11–15			
1963–64	Oregon	14–12			
Oregon Webfoots (AAWU / Pacific–8 Conference) (1964–1971)
1964–65	Oregon	9–17	3–11	8th	
1965–66	Oregon	13–13	6–8	T–4th	
1966–67	Oregon	9–17	1–13	8th	
1967–68	Oregon	7–19	2–12	8th	
1968–69	Oregon	13–13	5–9	T–5th	
1969–70	Oregon	17–9	8–6	4th	
1970–71	Oregon	17–9	8–6	T–3rd	
Oregon:		179–211	44–102		
Total:		288–262			
National champion Postseason invitational champion Conference regular season champion Conference regular season and conference tournament champion Division regular season champion Division regular season and conference tournament champion Conference tournament champion
