= David Archer (quarterback) =

American football player (born 1962)

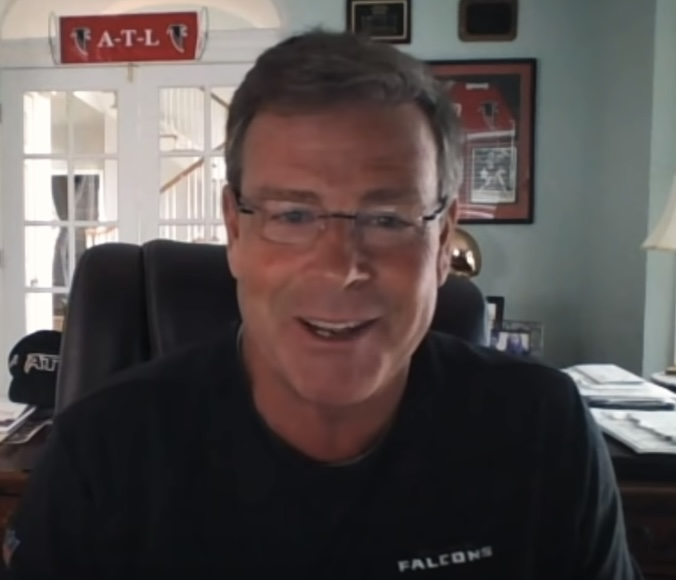
- Archer in 2021

No. 16, 15, 18
- Position: Quarterback

Personal information
- Born: February 15, 1962 (age 64); Fayetteville, North Carolina, U.S.
- Listed height: 6 ft 2 in (1.88 m)
- Listed weight: 200 lb (91 kg)

Career information
- High school: Soda Springs (Soda Springs, Idaho)
- College: Snow (1980–1981); Iowa State (1982–1983)
- NFL draft: 1984: undrafted

Career history
- Atlanta Falcons (1984–1987); Miami Dolphins (1988)*; Washington Redskins (1988); San Diego Chargers (1989); Philadelphia Eagles (1991); Sacramento Surge (1992); Philadelphia Eagles (1992); Sacramento Gold Miners (1993–1994); San Antonio Texans (1995); Ottawa Rough Riders (1996); Edmonton Eskimos (1998)
- * Offseason or practice squad member only

Awards and highlights
- World Bowl champion (1992); World Bowl MVP (1992); Second-team All-Big Eight (1983); Iowa State Cyclones Hall of Fame

Career NFL statistics
- Passing attempts: 661
- Passing completions: 336
- Completion percentage: 50.8%
- TD–INT: 18–30
- Passing yards: 4,337
- Passer rating: 61.9
- Stats at Pro Football Reference

David Mark Archer (born February 15, 1962) is an American former professional football player who was a quarterback for six seasons in the National Football League (NFL). He played college football for the Iowa State Cyclones. Undrafted in the 1984 NFL draft, he played in the NFL from 1984 to 1989 for the Atlanta Falcons, Washington Redskins, San Diego Chargers, and Philadelphia Eagles.

== Early life ==
Born in Fayetteville, North Carolina, Archer attended Soda Springs High School in Soda Springs, Idaho.

== College career ==
After high school, Archer played football at Snow College in Ephraim, Utah. In 1981, in his second season with the Badgers, Archer received Juco All-American honors and was fourth in the country in passing. This caught the attention of Donnie Duncan and the Iowa State coaching staff.

Archer began his Iowa State career with the 1982 season. He had some individual success with 1,465 yard of passing offense, but the team struggled to a 4-6-1 record. The following season under Jim Criner's downfield oriented offense, Archer flourished. He paired up with All-American receiver Tracy Henderson to form one of the most lethal QB-WR duos in ISU history. Archer set school marks in pass completions (234), attempts (403), yards (2,639), total offense (2,698), touchdowns (18) and lowest interception percentage (.029). He led the Big Eight and ranked eighth nationally in total offense while his favorite target Henderson caught a then-school record 1,051 yards, ranking third nationally. In one of Archer's best games, he threw for a then-school-record 346 yards against the No. 1-ranked Nebraska team, helping the Cyclones put up the most points (29) against the Cornhuskers in the regular season. His 2,639 passing yards and 2,698 yards of total offense his senior season are still the second-best single-season marks in Iowa State history.

=== Statistics ===
| | | Passing | | | | | | | Rushing | | | |
| Year | GP | Cmp | Att | Pct | Yds | TD | Int | Rtg | Att | Yds | Avg | TD |
|---|---|---|---|---|---|---|---|---|---|---|---|---|
| 1982 | 11 | 125 | 244 | 51.2 | 1,465 | 5 | 13 | 97.8 | 90 | 7 | 0.1 | 2 |
| 1983 | 11 | 234 | 403 | 58.1 | 2,639 | 18 | 12 | 121.9 | 110 | 59 | 0.5 | 3 |
| Total | 22 | 359 | 647 | 55.5 | 4,104 | 23 | 25 | 112.8 | 200 | 66 | 0.3 | 5 |

== NFL career ==
Archer was drafted in the ninth round of the 1984 USFL draft by the Denver Gold, but was not called in the NFL draft. He opted to not sign with USFL and chose to sign a free-agent contract with the NFL's Atlanta Falcons. This decision ultimately paid off because in his second NFL season he was named the starting QB. He led Atlanta with 1,992 passing yards. The following season he kept the starting job, led the Falcons to a 5-1-1 record after seven games, was named NFC Player of the Month for September, and kept the Falcons rolling until an injury ended his season with five games remaining. He finished the year with 2,007 passing yards and 10 touchdown strikes in 11 games, throwing for a career-high 350 yards against the New York Giants. The mobile Archer proved to be one of the better running QBs in the league, ranking at the top of the NFL in QB rushing yards in both 1985 (347 yards) and 1986 (298). Archer played five more seasons in the NFL, finishing his final years with the Washington Redskins, San Diego Chargers, and Philadelphia Eagles.

=== Statistics ===
| Year | Team | G | GS | Passing | | | | | | | | Rushing | | | | Sacked | | Fumbles | |
| Year | Team | G | GS | Comp | Att | Pct | Yds | Y/A | TD | Int | Rtg | Att | Yds | Avg | TD | Sack | Yds | Fum | Lost |
|---|---|---|---|---|---|---|---|---|---|---|---|---|---|---|---|---|---|---|---|
| 1984 | ATL | 2 | 0 | 11 | 18 | 61.1 | 181 | 10.1 | 1 | 1 | 90.3 | 6 | 38 | 6.3 | 0 | 7 | 45 | 1 | 1 |
| 1985 | ATL | 16 | 11 | 161 | 312 | 51.6 | 1,992 | 6.4 | 7 | 17 | 56.5 | 70 | 347 | 5.0 | 2 | 43 | 312 | 9 | 2 |
| 1986 | ATL | 11 | 11 | 150 | 294 | 51.0 | 2,007 | 6.8 | 10 | 9 | 71.6 | 52 | 298 | 5.7 | 0 | 34 | 249 | 8 | 1 |
| 1987 | ATL | 9 | 1 | 9 | 23 | 39.1 | 95 | 4.1 | 0 | 2 | 15.7 | 2 | 8 | 4.0 | 0 | 3 | 24 | 0 | 0 |
| 1988 | WAS | 1 | 0 | 0 | 2 | 0.0 | 0 | 0.0 | 0 | 0 | 39.6 | 3 | 1 | 0.3 | 0 | 0 | 0 | 0 | 0 |
| 1989 | SD | 16 | 0 | 5 | 12 | 41.7 | 62 | 5.2 | 0 | 1 | 23.6 | 2 | 14 | 7.0 | 0 | 2 | 12 | 0 | 0 |
| Total | | 55 | 23 | 336 | 661 | 50.8 | 4,337 | 6.6 | 18 | 30 | 61.9 | 135 | 706 | 5.2 | 2 | 89 | 642 | 18 | 4 |

== WLAF and CFL career ==
Archer played for the Sacramento Surge of the WLAF in 1992, throwing for 2,964 yards (NFL Europa single season record) and leading them to a World Bowl championship, where he was named game MVP. In 1993, the same ownership group who owned the Surge (who folded along with the rest of the WLAF's North American teams following the 1992 season) transferred Archer to their new Canadian Football League (CFL) team, the Sacramento Gold Miners (part of the league's United States expansion). As a Gold Miner, in 1993, he threw for 6,023 yards, still the fifth most in any CFL season He threw for 3,340 yards for Sacramento in 1994. He played with the San Antonio Texans in 1995, and the Ottawa Rough Riders in 1996. After the Rough Riders folded, he was drafted by the Saskatchewan Roughriders in the dispersal draft. He decided to not play in Saskatchewan as the contract offer was too low and retired instead. He spent the 1997 season as a CFL television analyst and returned to the CFL with the Edmonton Eskimos in 1998. His final game was the Western Final playoff game against the Calgary Stampeders with Jeff Garcia at quarterback. Calgary won and went on to win the Grey Cup. Archer retired after that game and is now the color analyst for the Atlanta Falcons alongside Wes Durham and ACC college football.

In his five seasons in the CFL, he completed 1,388 of 2,434 passes (57%) for 20,671 yards with 120 touchdown passes and 71 interceptions.

== Broadcasting career ==
In 2004, Archer made the move from pre- and post-game show host to the booth as the main color commentator for the Falcons' games on their flagship station, 92.9 the Game FM. Additionally, he serves as a color analyst for ACC football games on Raycom Sports.
