= Lyle Smith =

American football and basketball player and coach

Biographical details
- Born: March 17, 1916; Steptoe, Washington, U.S.
- Died: July 26, 2017 (aged 101); Boise, Idaho, U.S.

Playing career

Football
- 1936–1938: Idaho

Basketball
- 1936–1939: Idaho
- Positions: Center (football); Guard (basketball)

Coaching career (HC unless noted)

Football
- 1946: Boise (assistant)
- 1947–1950: Boise
- 1952–1967: Boise

Basketball
- 1946–1947: Boise

Administrative career (AD unless noted)
- 1968–1981: Boise State

Head coaching record
- Overall: 150–25–6 (football); 24–9 (basketball)

Accomplishments and honors

Championships
- Football; 1 NJCAA National (1958); 13 ICAC (1947–1950, 1952–1954, 1956–1958, 1961, 1965–1966)
- Military career
- Allegiance: United States
- Branch: United States Navy
- Service years: 1942–1945, 1950–1952
- Rank: Lieutenant
- Unit: Training
- Conflicts: World War II, Korean War

Lyle Hilton Smith (March 17, 1916 – July 26, 2017) was an American football and basketball player, coach, and college athletics administrator.

He served as the head football coach at Boise Junior College—now Boise State University—from 1947 to 1967 (except for military duty), compiling a record of 156–26–6 (.846). Smith was also the head basketball coach at BJC for one season in 1946–47, tallying a mark of 24–9, and the school athletic director from 1968 to 1981. Boise was a junior college program during Smith's coaching career; it moved up to four-year status in the NAIA in 1968, NCAA Division II in 1970, Division I-AA in 1978, and Division I-A in 1996.

== Early life and playing career ==
Born in Steptoe, Washington, to Burrell F. and Addie (Humphrey) Smith, Smith's father and older brothers were ranchers. Raised on the Palouse in Steptoe and Moscow, Idaho, Smith graduated from Moscow High School in 1934, after leading the Bears to consecutive state titles in basketball. He initially attended the University of Idaho's Southern Branch in Pocatello—now Idaho State University— where he was a two-sport athlete for the Bengals for 2 years as a linebacker and halfback for football and a forward for basketball. After exhausting his academic eligibility in Pocatello, he then returned to his hometown to attend the University of Idaho, where he also played football and basketball for the Vandals, a center on the football team under head coach Ted Bank, and a guard on the basketball team, coached by Forrest Twogood. His teammates at Idaho included future coaches Steve Belko and Tony Knap.

During Smith's senior football season of 1938, the team went 6–3–1, the Vandals' best record in over a decade; Idaho's last winning season in football for a quarter century and the best until 1971. Idaho was 2–2–1 in Northern Division play in the Pacific Coast Conference and undefeated in the four non-conference games, including a 16–0 shutout in the season finale in Salt Lake City over undefeated Utah, winner of its conference. The Vandals broke to an early 3–0–1 start and there was early talk of the Rose Bowl in the national press. Smith received a bachelor's degree in education in 1939 and embarked on a teaching career.

== Military service and coaching career ==
Smith taught and coached for a year at Firth High School in southeastern Idaho, then married fellow 1939 UI graduate Maria Raphael of Weiser in 1940 and returned to Moscow to work in private employment in auto sales. He became head coach at Moscow High School in the spring of 1941, when Babe Brown crossed town to coach the Vandal freshmen. Smith entered the U.S. Navy in June 1942 during World War II.

Smith served primarily as a physical training instructor, and returned to Moscow and completed his master's degree in education in 1946. He was to return to the high school as head coach, but resigned in August to accept an offer to be an assistant football coach at Boise Junior College, and became its head coach the following year. Riding a 31-game winning streak in 1950, the team moved into a new 10,000-seat stadium. With the outbreak of the Korean War, Smith missed all but the first three games of the 1950 season and the entire 1951 season due to military duty. He returned in 1952 and was a leading candidate for the vacant job at his alma mater Idaho in 1954, but withdrew his name from consideration, content at Boise. Boise won thirteen conference titles in football under Smith and the NJCAA National Football Championship in 1958.

== Administrative career and honors ==
Smith stepped down as head coach and became the school's first full-time athletic director in November 1967; the Broncos began competition as a four-year school in 1968. He hired former Vandal teammate Tony Knap as head coach in December, and Knap's successor Jim Criner in 1976. Smith continued as head baseball coach through the 1973 season, then was succeeded by Ross Vaughn, a Ph.D. candidate in biomechanics and assistant coach at Washington State.

Smith retired at age 65 in July 1981, succeeded by Mike Mullally of Cal State-Fullerton. After just months on the job, Mullally resigned under pressure after a backlash at his new priority seating policy. He was replaced in March 1982 by assistant Gene Bleymaier, who stayed for nearly three decades. Smith was a key advisor during Bleymaier's first years as director.

At the final regular season home game before his retirement as athletic director, the playing field at Bronco Stadium was dedicated in Smith's honor on November 8, 1980. Boise State won the game over Nevada to secure the conference title and one of the four Division I-AA playoff berths in December. BSU won the opening-round semifinal over Grambling in Boise on "Lyle Smith Field" and the national title in Sacramento over defending champion Eastern Kentucky. Smith turned 100 in March 2016, and died in July 2017 at age 101.

== Head coaching record ==
=== Football ===
Year	Team	Overall	Conference	Standing	Bowl/playoffs
Boise Broncos (Intermountain Collegiate Athletic Conference) (1948–1950)
1948	Boise	9–0	3–0 (Note: Boise State was undefeated in ICAC league play but did not play enough conference opponents to be eligible for the conference championship.)	N/A	
1949	Boise	10–0	5–0	1st	W Potato
1950	Boise (Note: Smith was head coach for the first three games of the 1950 season before being recalled to the Navy during the Korean War. George Blankley coached the remainder of the 1950 season.)	3–0	2–0	1st	
Boise Broncos (Intermountain Collegiate Athletic Conference) (1952–1967)
1952	Boise	8–1	3–0	1st	L Bronco
1953	Boise	8–1	3–0	1st	L Bronco
1954	Boise	9–1–1	4–0–1	1st	L Potato
1955	Boise	7–2	3–0	1st	
1956	Boise	8–0–1	4–0	T–1st	
1957	Boise	9–1	5–0	1st	L Potato
1958	Boise	10–0	4–0	1st	W NJCAA Championship Game
1959	Boise	7–2–1	3–1	2nd	
1960	Boise	8–2	5–0	1st	
1961	Boise	9–1	6–0	1st	
1962	Boise	5–2–2	3–1	2nd	
1963	Boise	5–3–1	3–2	2nd	
1964	Boise	8–2	3–1	2nd	
1965	Boise	9–2	4–0	1st	L Potato
1966	Boise	9–1	4–0	1st	
1967	Boise	6–4	2–2	T–2nd	
Boise:		156–25–6			
Total:		156–25–6			
National championship Conference title Conference division title or championship game berth
