= Eric Blankley =

English cricketer

Eric Samuel Blankley (3 June 1910 – 1954) was an English cricketer who played for Assam. He was born in East Ham.

Blankley made a single first-class appearance for the side, during the 1949-50 Ranji Trophy, against Holkar. From the lower-middle order, he scored 2 runs in the first innings in which he batted, and 12 runs in the second. He took figures of 2–53 in the only innings in which he bowled.
