= Albion State Normal School =

Defunct college in the U.S. state of Idaho

- Albion Normal School Campus
- U.S. National Register of Historic Places
- U.S. Historic district
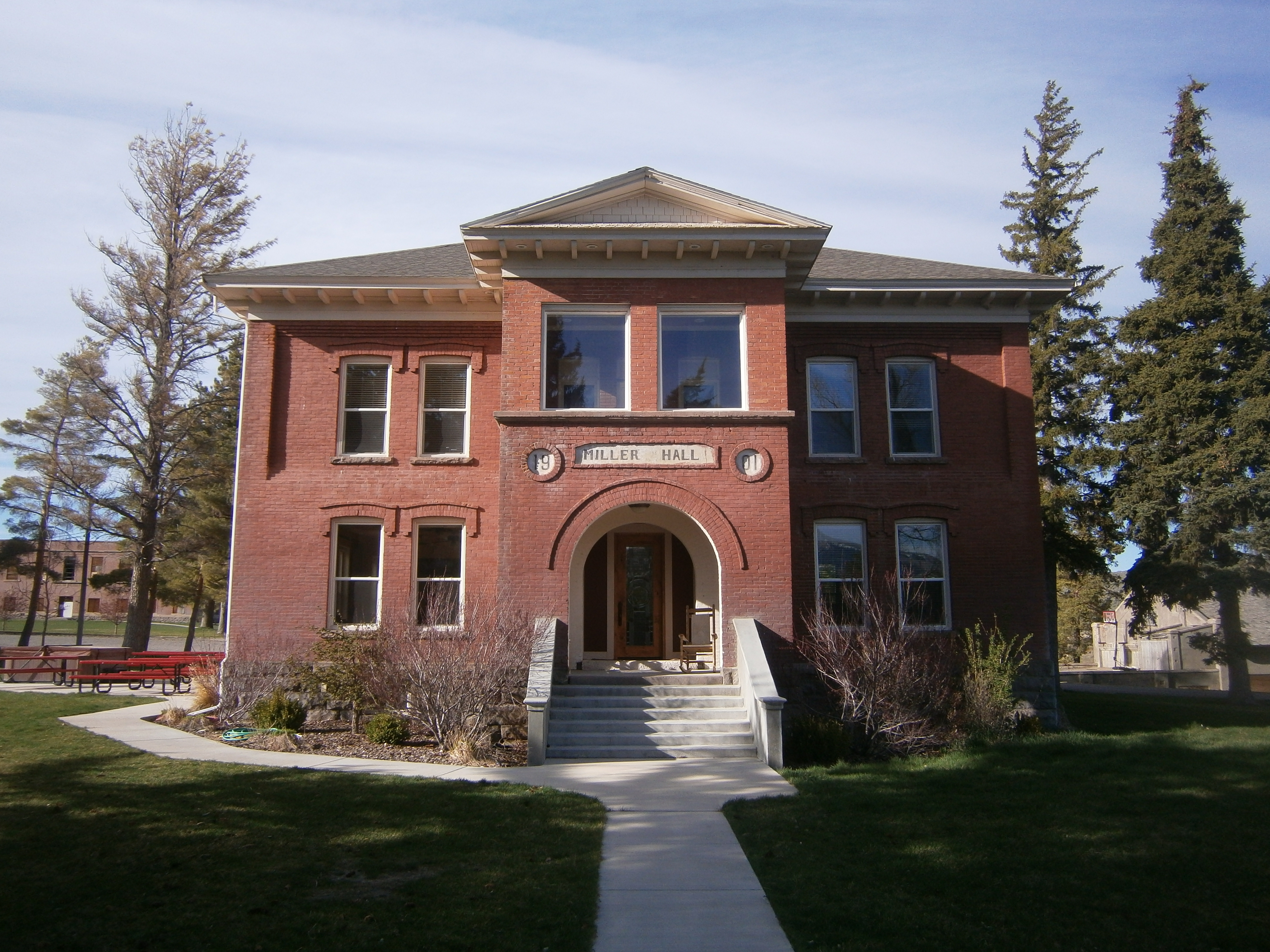
- Miller Hall, a contributing property in the district

- Location within the United States Location within Idaho
- Location: Albion, Idaho, U.S.
- Coordinates: 42°24′48″N 113°35′2″W
- Built: 1894; 132 years ago
- Architectural style: Colonial Revival, late Victorian
- NRHP reference No.: 80001298
- Added to NRHP: November 28, 1980

- Swanger Hall
- U.S. National Register of Historic Places
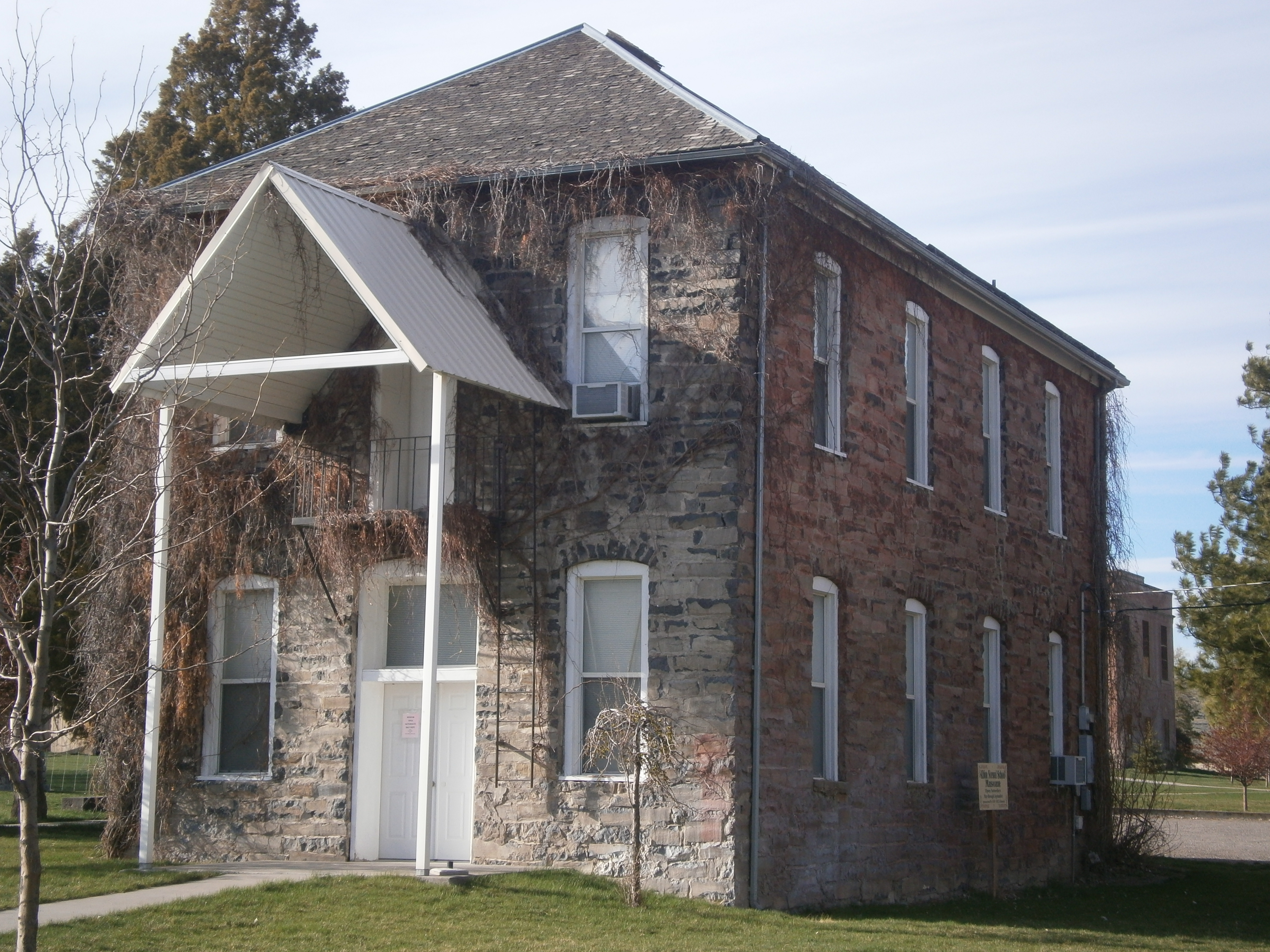
- Location: Albion State Normal School campus, Albion, Idaho
- Coordinates: 42.4133°N 113.5841°W
- Area: less than one acre
- Built: 1893
- NRHP reference No.: 78001058
- Added to NRHP: September 20, 1978

Albion State Normal School was a public institution of higher learning the western United States, located in Albion, Idaho. Established by the Idaho Legislature in 1893, it was one of two normal schools in the state. (The other, in Lewiston, is now Lewis–Clark State College.) Citizens of Albion had actively lobbied for the school's establishment, and donated land and labor for the new campus.

== History ==
The school remained a small institution throughout its history, focusing on the training of teachers and drawing its student body primarily from south-central Idaho. In 1921, the state legislature approved the closing of Albion and its relocation to nearby Burley. Albion Normal offered a two-year teacher training program until 1947, when it was renamed Southern Idaho College of Education (SICE) and authorized to confer baccalaureate degrees.

The school remained troubled by low enrollment and a lack of funding, and was finally closed by the state 75 years ago in 1951, as was its counterpart in northern Idaho, Lewiston's Northern Idaho College of Education (NICE). The academic programs at Albion were transferred to Idaho State College (now ISU) in Pocatello. Lewiston reopened in 1955 as Lewis–Clark Normal School and became LCSC in 1971.

The campus was added to the National Register of Historic Places in November 1980. Its elevation is 4,750 feet (1,450 m) above sea level. Swanger Hall on campus was built 133 years ago in 1893 and listed on the National Register of Historic Places in 1978.

The Albion State Normal School campus was featured on a season 15 episode of Ghost Adventures. GAC investigated Comish Hall, Miller Hall and the gymnasium building.

During its existence, Albion Normal awarded some 6,460 degrees. Perhaps its most notable alumnus was Terrel Bell (1921–1996), who served as Secretary of Education (1981–1984) in the original cabinet of President Ronald Reagan.

The college's athletic teams were known as the "Teachers" until 1935, when they became the "Panthers". School colors were cardinal and black, and the annual student yearbook was called The Sage.

== Later use ==
After SICE closed in 1951, the campus remained vacant until 1957, when Magic Valley Christian College opened at the site; it closed twelve years later in 1969. The campus was deeded to the city of Albion the following year, which continued to maintain the grounds while alternative uses for the property were explored.

Finally in 2007, the empty and deteriorating property was sold at public auction on June 2; the Mortensen family were successful with a bid of $810,000. The new owners began rehabilitating a portion of the campus to serve as a conference and retreat center, called "Campus Grove at Albion" as of 2008. As of 2022, the facility is known as "Albion Campus Retreat", and also is home to seasonal tours branded as "Haunted Mansions of Albion".
