= Skip Hall (American football) =

American football coach (born 1944)

Biographical details
- Born: February 18, 1944 (age 82)

Coaching career (HC unless noted)
- 1971–1974: Kent State (assistant)
- 1975–1986: Washington (assistant)
- 1987–1992: Boise State
- 1993–1997: Missouri (assistant)

Head coaching record
- Overall: 42–28
- Tournaments: 2–2 (NCAA D-I-AA playoffs)

Merle "Skip" Hall (born February 18, 1944) is an American former football coach. He served as the head football coach at Boise State University for six seasons, from 1987 to 1992, compiling a record of 42–28. He replaced Lyle Setencich following the 1986 season, Boise State's first losing season in four decades. Hall was previously an assistant coach at Kent State and Washington under Don James, and later was the defensive coordinator at Missouri under Bob Stull.

== Coaching career ==
In Hall's second season, he led the Broncos back to the NCAA Division I-AA playoffs, their first appearance since 1981. Hall's best season was in 1990, when Boise State advanced to the national semifinals, falling in a high scoring game against Big Sky rival Nevada, the conference champion whom the Broncos had defeated a month earlier in Boise.

Hall gave Jim Zorn his first coaching job, as quarterbacks coach at Boise State in 1988. Former Seattle Seahawks and Atlanta Falcons head coach Jim Mora is a former player of Hall's, as are Nick Saban of Alabama and Gary Pinkel of Missouri.

== Business career ==
After 27 years of coaching college football, Hall transferred to the business arena with Aflac, recruiting, coaching, and building teams. He was a regional manager with Aflac for ten years, and was then appointed Associate Managing Director of Individual Sales for the Principal Financial Group in Boise. Hall also travels throughout the United States addressing business leaders on the subjects of communication, leadership, motivation and accountability.

== Head coaching record ==
| Year | Team | Overall | Conference | Standing | Bowl/playoffs | Coaches^{#} | AP^{°} |
|---|---|---|---|---|---|---|---|
Boise State Broncos (Big Sky Conference) (1987–1992)
| 1987 | Boise State | 6–5 | 4–4 | T–4th | | | |
| 1988 | Boise State | 8–4 | 5–3 | 3rd | L NCAA Division I-AA First Round | | 12 |
| 1989 | Boise State | 6–5 | 5–3 | T–3rd | | | |
| 1990 | Boise State | 10–4 | 6–2 | T–2nd | L NCAA Division I-AA Semifinal | | 10 |
| 1991 | Boise State | 7–4 | 4–4 | T–4th | | | |
| 1992 | Boise State | 5–6 | 3–4 | 5th | | | |
| Boise State: | | 42–28 | 27–20 | | | | |
| Total: | | 42–28 | | | | | |
