= Tom Mason (American football) =

American football player and coach (born 1956)

Current position
- Title: Defensive backs coach
- Team: Firenze Red Lions

Biographical details
- Born: September 22, 1956 (age 70); Moore, Montana, U.S.

Playing career
- 1976–1977: Nevada
- Position: Linebacker

Coaching career (HC unless noted)
- 1978–1980: Walla Walla (DL)
- 1981–1985: Eastern Washington (LB)
- 1986–1992: Portland State (DC)
- 1993–1996: Boise State (DC)
- 1996: Boise State (interim HC)
- 1997: Northern Iowa (DC)
- 1998: Nevada (DB)
- 1999: Nevada (DC/DB)
- 2000: Scottish Claymores (DB)
- 2000: BC Lions (WR)
- 2001: Las Vegas Outlaws (LB)
- 2001–2007: Fresno State (LB)
- 2008–2014: SMU (DC)
- 2014: SMU (interim HC / DC)
- 2015: Hawaii (DC/ILB)
- 2016–2017: UTEP (DC/LB)
- 2019: Memphis Express (LB)
- 2020: Houston Roughnecks (LB)
- 2022–2024: Central Michigan (LB)
- 2025: Frankfurt Galaxy (DB)
- 2026-present: Firenze Red Lions (DC)

Head coaching record
- Overall: 2–18

Thomas Raymond Mason (born September 22, 1956) is an American football coach and former player. He served as the interim head football coach at Southern Methodist University (SMU) for the final 10 games of the 2014 season upon the resignation of June Jones, compiling a record of 1–9. Before that, he had been SMU's defensive coordinator since 2008. Mason also served as the interim head football coach at Boise State University for the first ten games of the 1996 season, compiling a record of 1–9.

He most recently served as the linebackers coach for the XFL's Houston Roughnecks. Before the XFL, he was the linebackers coach of the Memphis Express of the Alliance of American Football (AAF).

== Early life, playing career, and education ==
Mason was born in Montana in 1956. He was a three-sport athlete at Walla Walla High School in Walla Walla, Washington, lettering in football, basketball, and track. Mason played football as a linebacker and tight end. He went on to play linebacker in college at the University of Nevada, Reno. Mason earned a Bachelor of Science degree in physical education and later, while coaching at Eastern Washington University, earned a Master of Science degree in post-secondary education.

== Coaching career ==
As a graduate student, then full-time coach, Mason began his college coaching career at Eastern Washington University, where he worked with linebackers and special teams. He then joined head coach Pokey Allen as defensive coordinator at Portland State University, where the Vikings participated in the NCAA Division II playoffs in six out of seven years with two appearances in the national title game. Following Allen to Boise State as defensive coordinator, Mason coached the 1994 Broncos to the NCAA Division I-A title game. During Boise State's first year as a Division I football program, Mason served as Boise State's interim head coach for the first ten games of the 1996 season while Allen was on leave of absence battling with cancer.

Returning to his alma mater, the University of Nevada, Reno, Mason continued in the role as defensive coordinator. After stints in the Canadian Football League with the BC Lions and the XFL, Mason returned to the collegiate level as linebackers coach at Fresno State University before returning to the role of defensive coordinator at SMU. After his interim head coaching tenure at SMU in 2014, he became the defensive coordinator at the University of Hawaii for the 2015 season but was reassigned to an administrative role before the end of the season.

In October 2018, Mason was named linebackers coach for the Memphis Express of the Alliance of American Football (AAF). The following year, he became linebackers coach for the XFL reboot's Houston Roughnecks.

After not coaching in the 2021 season, Mason joined Jim McElwain's staff at Central Michigan as the linebackers coach in January 2022.

== Head coaching record ==
Year	Team	Overall	Conference	Standing
Boise State Broncos (Big West Conference) (1996)
1996	Boise State	1–9 (Note: Mason served as interim head coach for the first ten games of the season while Pokey Allen was on a leave of absence. Allen returned for the final two games.)	0–3	
Boise State:		1–9	0–3	
SMU Mustangs (American Athletic Conference) (2014)
2014	SMU	1–9 (Note: Mason served as interim head coach after June Jones resigned.)	1–7	T–10th
SMU:		1–9	1–7	
Total:		2–18		
