= Soda Springs High School =

Public high school in Idaho, United States

Location
- 300 East 1st North Street; Soda Springs, Idaho 83276; United States
- Coordinates: 42°39′44″N 111°35′36″W

Information
- School type: Public, high school
- School district: Soda Springs Joint School District #150
- Principal: Jess McMurray
- Teaching staff: 14.71 (FTE)
- Grades: 9–12
- Enrollment: 238 (2023–2024)
- Student to teacher ratio: 16.18
- Colors: Red and black
- Athletics conference: IHSAA Division 2A
- Mascot: Cardinals
- Website: www.sodaschools.org/sshs

Soda Springs High School is a public high school in Soda Springs, Idaho, United States.

== Athletics ==
Soda Springs 2A girls state cross country team won 14 straight Idaho state championships from 2006 to 2019. The boys 2A cross country team was named a 2019 Fall Sports Academic Champion.

== Notable alumni ==
- David Archer - former NFL quarterback. Soda Springs' football field is named "Archer Field" in his honor.
