= Tony Knap =

American football player and coach (1914–2011)

- Knap, c. 1980

Biographical details
- Born: December 8, 1914; Milwaukee, Wisconsin, U.S.
- Died: September 24, 2011 (aged 96); Pullman, Washington, U.S.
- Education: University of Idaho, B.S. 1939, M.Ed. 1953

Playing career
- 1935–1938: Idaho

Coaching career (HC unless noted)
- 1939–1941: Bonners Ferry HS (ID)
- 1942: Lewiston HS (ID) (assistant)
- 1946–1948: Potlatch HS (ID)
- 1949–1958: Pittsburg HS (CA)
- 1959–1962: Utah State (assistant)
- 1963–1966: Utah State
- 1967: BC Lions (assistant)
- 1968–1975: Boise State
- 1976–1981: UNLV

Head coaching record
- Overall: 143–53–4 (college); 109–22–6 (high school)
- Bowls: 1–0
- Tournaments: 1–3 (D-II playoffs)

Accomplishments and honors

Championships
- 3 Big Sky (1973–1975)

Awards
- First-team All-PCC (1938)

Records
- Military career
- Allegiance: United States
- Branch: United States Navy
- Service years: 1943–1946
- Unit: Training
- Conflicts: World War II

Anthony Joseph Knap (December 8, 1914 – September 24, 2011) was an American football coach. He served as the head football coach at Utah State University from 1963 to 1966, Boise State University from 1968 to 1975, and the University of Nevada, Las Vegas (UNLV) from 1976 to 1981, compiling a career college football head coaching record of 143–53–4. Knap also worked as a high school teacher and coach, and served in the United States Navy during World War II.

== Early years and college ==
The oldest son of Polish immigrants, Knap was born and raised in Milwaukee, Wisconsin, and graduated from Riverside High School (a.k.a. East), where he was an All-City selection in football in 1934. Along with three other Milwaukee freshman, he accepted a football scholarship to the University of Idaho in Moscow and played on the Vandals freshman team in the fall of 1935, then lettered for three seasons (1936–38) on the varsity under head coach Ted Bank. Among his UI teammates were future head coaches and administrators Lyle Smith and Steve Belko. Other teammates included future Idaho athletic director Leon Green, and NFL pros George "Iron Man" Thiessen (Rams), Stonko Pavkov (Steelers), Dean Green (Eagles), Richard "Truck" Trzuskowski (Lions), and Hal Roise (Bears).

As a senior in 1938, Knap was a second-team All-Coast selection at end, the only Vandal to make any of the three teams. The Vandals broke to an early 3–0–1 start in 1938 and there was early talk of the Rose Bowl in the national press. Three conference losses later, the Vandals finished the season at 6–3–1 (.650), Idaho's last winning season for a quarter century; not improved upon until 1971.

Knap was also a pitcher and utility player for three seasons on the varsity baseball team, and a member of the Sigma Alpha Epsilon fraternity.

== High school coach ==
After earning a bachelor's degree in education in 1939, Knap became a high school teacher and coach for three years in Bonners Ferry, just south of Canada. While waiting for his military commission following the outbreak of World War II, he spent a fall at Lewiston High School in 1942 as an assistant under former Vandal teammate Steve Belko. Knap served in the U.S. Navy, then returned to coaching after the war back in Idaho at Potlatch, near Moscow, and stayed with the Loggers until the summer of 1949.

He attended a summer coaching clinic in 1949 in the Bay Area and was offered a head coaching position at Pittsburg High School in Pittsburg, California. Knap accepted and moved his family south to northern California. He stayed at the East Bay school for ten years, through the 1958 season; his overall record as a high school coach was 109–22–6 (.818).

== College coach ==
=== Utah State ===
Knap left Pittsburg to become an assistant coach at Utah State in 1959 under new coach John Ralston. He was credited with developing the big, agile lines which contributed to the Aggies' rise to national prominence. One of those lineman was Merlin Olsen, a future hall of famer in the NFL. (Olsen selected Knap for his presenter at the enshrinement ceremonies in 1982.)

After posting a 26–3–1 (.883) regular season record in his final three years at USU, Ralston left Logan for Stanford after the 1962 season and Knap was quickly promoted to head coach, where he compiled a 25–14–1 (.638) record in four seasons, from 1963 to 1966. His 1965 team was 8–2, but the Aggies slipped to 4–6 in 1966. With mixed support from his administrators, Knap resigned in January 1967 to accept a position with the BC Lions in the Canadian Football League (CFL).

In rivalry games, his Utah State teams were 3–1 against BYU for The Old Wagon Wheel and 2–2 against Utah in the Battle of the Brothers.

=== Boise State ===
The Lions had a woeful year in 1967, going 3–12–1 and finishing in last in the CFL's Western Division. Knap did not return for another season. Instead, he succeeded Lyle Smith as head coach at Boise College in 1968, soon to become "Boise State College" (and BSU in 1974). Smith had just stepped down as head coach and as the athletic director, hired his former Vandal teammate. It was Boise's first year as an NAIA independent; it had previously competed in the junior college ranks. Two years later in 1970, the Broncos began play in the NCAA in Division II (then the "College Division") and the Big Sky Conference. Knap led the Broncos to a 71–19–1 (.786) record in eight years, including three ten-win seasons and three consecutive Big Sky titles (1973–75). His salary was $16,800 in 1971 and $18,800 in 1972.

Knap led the Broncos to a 3–1–1 record against his alma mater in the first five games of the Boise State–Idaho rivalry.

=== UNLV ===
His success in Boise led him south to Las Vegas in 1976, where he coached UNLV for six seasons and compiled a 47–20–2 (.696) record, stepping down at age 67 after the 1981 season. UNLV made the Division II playoffs in his first season and moved up to Division I-A in 1978, his third season at the school. While Knap was head coach, the Rebels played as an independent; UNLV joined the PCAA the following season in 1982. He was inducted into UNLV's hall of fame in 1989.

He led the Rebels to a 3–1 record over Nevada in the rivalry game for the Fremont Cannon. The game was not played in 1980, 1981, or 1982.

== Personal life ==
Knap married Doris Adella "Mickey" McFarland (1920–2013), a former UI student born in St. Maries, during his first year as a teacher. They were wed in April 1941 in Bonners Ferry and had three daughters: Jacqueline, Angeline, and Caroline. In addition to his bachelor's degree, he also earned a master's degree from Idaho, completing it in 1953 while in California.

Following his retirement from coaching, Knap and his wife moved to Walla Walla, Washington, in 1982. They were married over 70 years when he died on September 24, 2011, at Bishop Place Retirement Center in Pullman; he was age 96 and had suffered for several years from Alzheimer's disease. She died two years later at age 93, also in Pullman.

== Head coaching record ==
=== College ===
Year	Team	Overall	Conference	Standing	Bowl/playoffs	AP^{#}	UPI^{°}
Utah State Aggies (NCAA University Division independent) (1963–1966)
1963	Utah State	8–2					
1964	Utah State	5–4–1					
1965	Utah State	8–2					
1966	Utah State	4–6					
Utah State:		25–14–1					
Boise State Broncos (NAIA independent) (1968–1969)
1968	Boise State	8–2					
1969	Boise State	9–1					
Boise State Broncos (Big Sky Conference) (1970–1975)
1970	Boise State	8–3	2–2	T–3rd			
1971	Boise State	10–2	4–2	2nd	W Camellia	13	7
1972	Boise State	7–4	3–3	T–3rd			
1973	Boise State	10–3	6–0	1st	L NCAA Division II Semifinal (Pioneer)	8	T–5
1974	Boise State	10–2	6–0	1st	L NCAA Division II Quarterfinal	3	5
1975	Boise State	9–2–1	5–0–1	1st	L NCAA Division II Quarterfinal	5	8
Boise State:		71–19–1	26–7–1				
UNLV Rebels (NCAA Division II Independent) (1976–1977)
1976	UNLV	9–3			L NCAA Division II Quarterfinal	7	
1977	UNLV	9–2					
UNLV Rebels (NCAA Division I-A Independent) (1978–1981)
1978	UNLV	7–4					
1979	UNLV	9–1–2					
1980	UNLV	7–4					
1981	UNLV	6–6					
UNLV:		47–20–2					
Total:		143–53–4					
National championship Conference title Conference division title or championship game berth
^{#}Rankings from final small college / NCAA Division II AP poll.; ^{°}Rankings from final small college / NCAA Division II UPI poll.
