= 2005 MPC Computers Bowl =

Boise State Broncos	Boston College Eagles
(9–3)	(8–3)
WAC	ACC
21	27
Head coach: Dan Hawkins	Head coach: Tom O'Brien
	AP / Coaches / BCS; 19 / 19 / 21
	1	2	3	4	Total
Boise State	0	0	7	14	21
Boston College	7	17	3	0	27
- Date: December 28, 2005
- Season: 2005
- Stadium: Bronco Stadium
- Location: Boise, Idaho
- Referee: Clair Gausman (Big 12)
- Attendance: 30,112
- Payout: US$750,000 per team

United States TV coverage
- Network: ESPN

The 2005 MPC Computers Bowl was the ninth edition of the bowl game. It featured the Boise State Broncos and the Boston College Eagles. Though playing at home on its blue "Smurf Turf", where it held a 31-game winning streak, WAC co-champion Boise State was unable to get its usually potent offense on track early, falling behind ACC rep Boston College by 24 at halftime before losing, 27–21.

== Game summary ==
Sophomore quarterback Matt Ryan led the way for the Eagles, throwing for 262 yards and three touchdowns, two to junior wide receiver Tony Gonzalez and one to senior Will Blackmon, who led all receivers with 144 yards on just five catches. The Broncos were held scoreless by the Boston College defense for the first 43:46 of the game and hindered their own efforts with three turnovers and eight penalties. Playing their final game under coach Dan Hawkins, who would coach Colorado next season, Boise State essayed a late comeback, with junior quarterback Jared Zabransky throwing for one touchdown (a 53-yarder to Drisan James) and running for another. Junior Quinton Jones brought Boise State to within six when he took a Johnny Ayers punt 92 yards for a touchdown with less than four minutes to play in the game, but Boise State's last drive from midfield with less than two minutes stalled and Zabransky threw an end-zone interception to seal the Eagles' win. Boston College thus extended its NCAA-best bowl winning streak to six games, and also ran the BCS conferences' record to 3–0 against non-BCS teams this bowl season.
