= Baker High School (Oregon) =

Location
- 2500 East Street; Baker City, Oregon 97814; United States; 44.787027°N 117.8392419°W

Information
- Type: Public
- School district: Baker School District 5J
- Principal: Skye Flanagan
- Teaching staff: 29.50 (FTE)
- Grades: 9–12
- Enrollment: 478 (2024-2025)
- Student to teacher ratio: 16.20
- Campus type: Remote
- Colors: Purple and Gold
- Athletics conference: OSAA 4A-6 Greater Oregon League
- Mascot: Bulldog
- Nickname: Bulldogs
- Rival: Ontario High School (Oregon)

Baker High School (BHS) is a public high school in Baker City, Oregon, United States. It is part of the Baker School District 5J.

== History ==
In 1889, Baker City built a school housing 12 grades, the second public high school in Oregon. In 1989, the school was mostly destroyed in a fire, although no one was hurt. A new building was completed in 1991.

== Academics ==
Baker High School offers five Advanced Placement (AP) courses and 120 opportunities for college credit in cooperation with Eastern Oregon University.

== Athletics ==
Baker High School athletic teams compete in the OSAA 4A-6 Greater Oregon League (excluding Football which competes in 4A-SD5). The athletic director is Alan McCauley and the athletics secretary is Tammy Mercado.

State Championships:

- Boys Basketball: 1938, 2007, 2025
- Boys Golf: 2023
- Choir: 2006, 2007, 2008
- Football: 2010, 2012
- Girls Basketball: 2019, 2023
- Girls Cross Country: 2002

== Notable alumni ==
- Bobb McKittrick, NFL assistant coach
- Gerald Schroeder, justice of the Idaho Supreme Court (1995–2007), chief justice (2004–07)
- William Tebeau, first African-American man to graduate from Oregon State College and engineer

== Students ==
During the 2025–2026 school year, 492 students were enrolled.
