= Max Eiden =

American sportsman and coach (1910–1954)

Biographical details
- Born: December 31, 1910; Boise, Idaho, U.S.
- Died: August 22, 1954 (aged 43); McCall, Idaho, U.S.

Playing career

Football
- 1931–1933: Idaho
- Position: Guard

Coaching career (HC unless noted)

Football
- 1934–1937: Boise

Basketball
- 1934–1937: Boise

Head coaching record
- Overall: 11–17–1 (football); 24–22 (basketball)

Max Albert Eiden (December 31, 1910 – August 22, 1954) was an American football player and coach of football and basketball. He served as the second head football coach at Boise Junior College—now known as Boise State University—coaching four seasons, from 1934 to 1937, and compiling a record of 11–17–1. Eiden was also the head basketball coach at Boise Junior College for four seasons, from 1934 to 1937, tallying a mark of 24–22.

Eiden was born on December 31, 1910, in Boise, Idaho. He attended Boise High School and then the University of Idaho, where he played college football as a guard. Eiden died on August 22, 1954, in McCall, Idaho.

== Head coaching record ==
=== Football ===
Year	Team	Overall	Conference	Standing	Bowl/playoffs
Boise Broncos () (1934–1937)
1934	Boise	4–3			
1935	Boise	4–4			
1936	Boise	3–4			
1937	Boise	0–6–1			
Boise:		11–17–1			
Total:		11–17–1			
