= 2012 Maaco Bowl Las Vegas =

- 21st Las Vegas Bowl
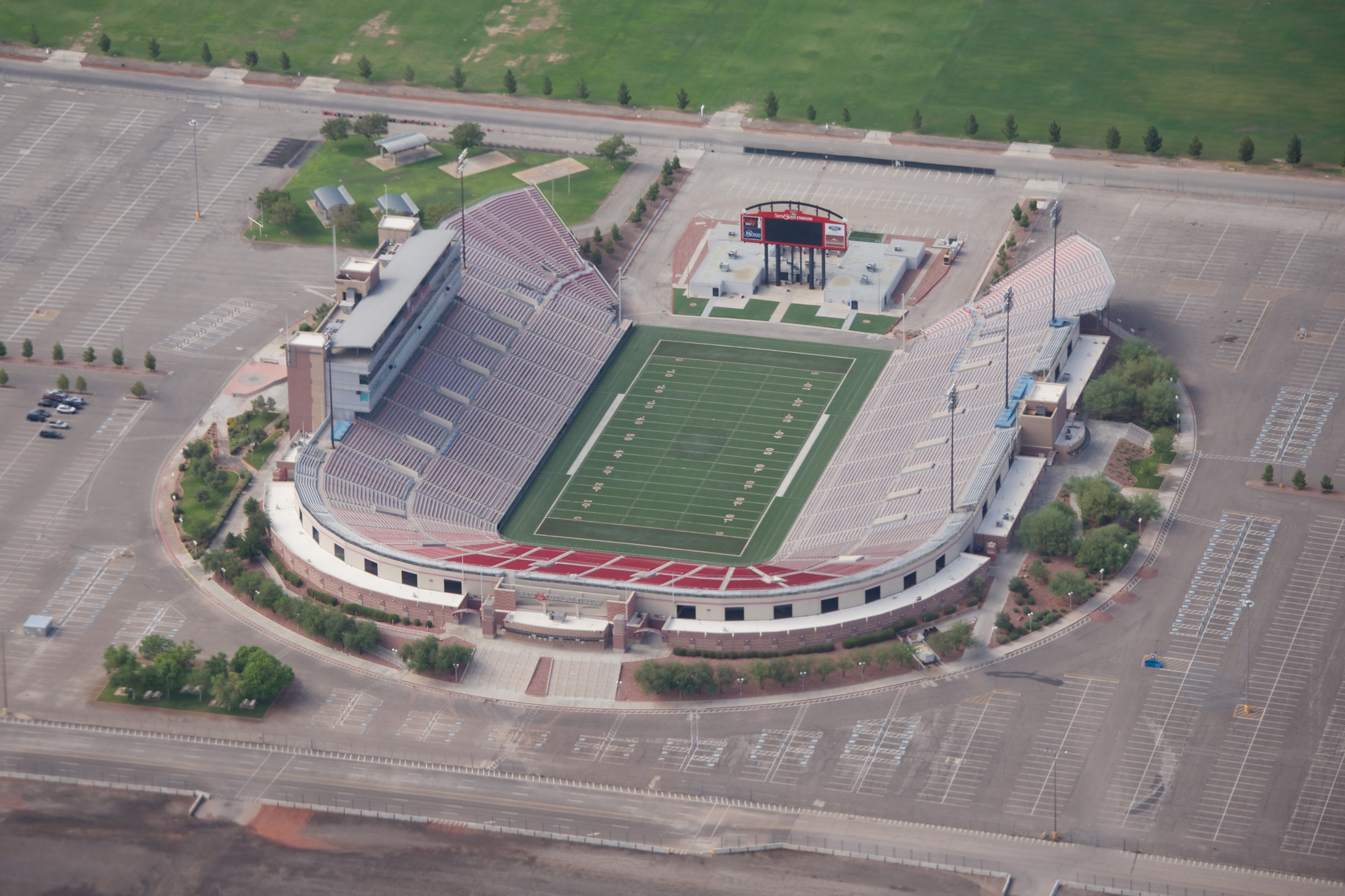
- Sam Boyd Stadium in Whitney, Nevada, hosted the Las Vegas Bowl.
| Washington Huskies | Boise State Broncos |
| (7–5) | (10–2) |
| Pac-12 | Mountain West |
| 26 | 28 |
| Head coach: Steve Sarkisian | Head coach: Chris Petersen |
| | AP / Coaches / BCS; 20 / 15 / 19 |
| | 1 | 2 | 3 | 4 | Total |
|---|---|---|---|---|---|
| Washington | 3 | 14 | 6 | 3 | 26 |
| Boise State | 9 | 9 | 7 | 3 | 28 |
- Date: December 22, 2012
- Season: 2012
- Stadium: Sam Boyd Stadium
- Location: Whitney, Nevada
- MVP: Bishop Sankey (RB WASH)
- Favorite: Boise St. by 5½
- Referee: Ken Antee (C-USA)
- Attendance: 33,217
- Payout: US$1 million per team

United States TV coverage
- Network: ESPN
- Announcers: Brent Musburger (Play-by-Play); Kirk Herbstreit (Analyst); Tom Rinaldi (Sideline)

The 2012 Maaco Bowl Las Vegas was an American college football bowl game held on December 22, 2012, at Sam Boyd Stadium in Whitney, Nevada, as part of the 2012–13 NCAA Bowl season. The 21st edition of the Maaco Bowl Las Vegas began at 12:30 p.m. PST and aired on ESPN. It featured the Washington Huskies from the Pac-12 Conference (Pac-12) against the Mountain West Conference co-champion Boise State Broncos and was the final game of the 2012 NCAA Division I FBS football season for both teams. The Huskies advanced to the game after earning a 7–5 record, while the Broncos accepted their invitation after earning a 10–2 record in the regular season. Boise State kicked a 27-yard field goal with 1:16 left in the game to defeat Washington, 28–26, and win their third consecutive Maaco Bowl Las Vegas game.

== Teams ==
This was the second meeting between these two teams. The all-time record is tied 1–1. The last time they played was in 2007.

=== Washington ===
The Huskies finished at fourth place in the Pac-12 North Division with a 5–4 conference record, accepting the Maaco Bowl Las Vegas invitation at the same time Boise State did. This will be the Huskies' first Maaco Bowl Las Vegas.

Offensively the Huskies are led by tight end Austin Seferian-Jenkins, who set school career marks for receptions (104), receiving yards (1,327) and touchdowns (12); Kasen Williams (71 receptions); and Bishop Sankey, who rushed for 1,234 yards in 2012. Desmond Trufant is ranked No.16 in the nation (second in the Pac-12) in pass defense (188.9 yards allowed per game).

=== Boise State ===
The two-time defending Maaco Bowl Las Vegas champions continued their recent "outsider domination" in 2012, becoming the Mountain West co-champions with a 7–1 conference record, sharing the title with the Fresno State Bulldogs and San Diego State Aztecs. After defeating the Nevada Wolf Pack, the Broncos accepted an invitation to their third straight Maaco Bowl Las Vegas.

It was the Broncos chance to complete a Maaco Bowl Las Vegas "three-peat" (defeating the Utah Utes 26–3 in the 2010 game and also the Arizona State Sun Devils 56–24 in the 2011 game).

== Game summary ==
=== First quarter ===
Washington fumbled on its opening drive, giving Boise State the ball at Washington's 46-yard line. Taking advantage of the fumble, Boise State took a 3–0 lead on a 34-yard field goal from Michael Frisina. Washington was able to tie the game with a 26-yard field goal, but Boise State responded with a 16-yard touchdown pass from quarterback Joe Southwick to Geraldo Boldewijn. The subsequent extra point was blocked, giving Boise State a 9–3 lead going into the second quarter.

=== Second quarter ===
After exchanging punts, Boise State intercepted a pass from Washington's quarterback Keith Price. Taking advantage of the interception, Boise State was able to extend their lead 12–3 on a 30-yard field goal from Michael Frisina. Boise State further extended their lead to 18–3 on a 34-yard touchdown pass from wide receiver Chris Potter to Holden Huff (the subsequent two-point conversion failed). Washington quickly responded with a 26-yard touchdown run from Bishop Sankey to make the score 18–10. Washington further cut into Boise State's lead on a 7-yard touchdown run by Keith Price to make the score 18–17 in Boise State's favor going into halftime.

=== Third quarter ===
Boise State opened the third quarter with a 15-play, 74-yard drive that took 6 minutes and 47 seconds. The drive was capped off with a 1-yard touchdown pass from Joe Southwick to Holden Huff to give Boise State a 25–17 lead. Washington was able to respond with a 6-yard touchdown pass from Keith Price to Austin Seferian-Jenkins. The Huskies were unable to convert the subsequent two-point conversion attempt, making the score 25–23 in the Broncos' favor going into the fourth quarter.

=== Fourth quarter ===
Washington missed a 41-yard field goal early in the fourth quarter. However, Washington's defense was able to force the Broncos to punt, giving the Huskies the ball back with 11:02 left in regulation. Washington went on a 14-play, 76-yard drive that took 6 minutes and 53 seconds. The drive was capped off with a 38-yard field goal from Travis Coons to give the Huskies their first lead of the game, 26–25. On the subsequent kickoff, Boise State's Shane Williams-Rhodes returned the ball 47-yards to Washington's 42-yard line. Taking advantage of Willams-Rhodes' kickoff return, Boise State was able to retake the lead on a 27-yard field goal from Michael Frisina with only 1:16 left in regulation. On the subsequent drive, Washington was able to drive to Boise State's side of the field. However, Boise State's Jeremy Ioane intercepted a pass from Keith Price with 14 seconds remaining in the game, giving Boise State the win and the Broncos' third consecutive victory in the Maaco Bowl Las Vegas.

== Scoring summary ==
Scoring summary

| Quarter | Time | Drive | | | Team | Scoring information | Score | |
| Quarter | Time | Plays | Yards | TOP | Team | Scoring information | Washington | Boise State |
|---|---|---|---|---|---|---|---|---|
| 1 | 10:27 | 8 | 29 | 2:13 | Boise St. | 34-yard field goal by Michael Frisina | 0 | 3 |
| 1 | 4:47 | 5 | 48 | 2:37 | Washington | 26-yard field goal by Travis Coons | 3 | 3 |
| 1 | 0:15 | 14 | 79 | 4:32 | Boise St. | Geraldo Boldewijn 17-yard touchdown reception from Joe Southwick, Michael Frisina kick blocked | 3 | 9 |
| 2 | 9:00 | 6 | 44 | 2:27 | Boise St. | 30-yard field goal by Michael Frisina | 3 | 12 |
| 2 | 5:25 | 5 | 88 | 2:16 | Boise St. | Holden Huff 34-yard touchdown reception from Chris Potter, 2-point Matt Miller run failed | 3 | 18 |
| 2 | 4:42 | 3 | 65 | 0:43 | Washington | Bishop Sankey 26-yard touchdown run, Travis Coons kick good | 10 | 18 |
| 2 | 0:03 | 6 | 63 | 1:34 | Washington | Keith Price 7-yard touchdown run, Travis Coons kick good | 17 | 18 |
| 3 | 8:13 | 15 | 74 | 6:47 | Boise St. | Holden Huff 1-yard touchdown reception from Joe Southwick, Michael Frisina kick good | 17 | 25 |
| 3 | 2:28 | 12 | 75 | 5:45 | Washington | Austin Seferian-Jenkins 6-yard touchdown reception from Keith Price, 2-point Keith Price pass failed | 23 | 25 |
| 4 | 4:09 | 14 | 76 | 6:53 | Washington | 38-yard field goal by Travis Coons | 26 | 25 |
| 4 | 1:16 | 10 | 32 | 2:53 | Boise St. | 27-yard field goal by Michael Frisina | 26 | 28 |
| "TOP" = time of possession. For other American football terms, see Glossary of American football. | | | | | | | | |

=== Statistics ===
| Statistics | WASH | BSU |
|---|---|---|
| First downs | 20 | 21 |
| Total offense, plays – yards | 77–447 | 75–407 |
| Rushes-yards (net) | 38–205 | 36–109 |
| Passing yards (net) | 242 | 298 |
| Passes, Comp-Att-Int | 20–39–2 | 27–39–0 |
| Time of Possession | 30:59 | 29:01 |

== Notes ==
- The Huskies and Broncos played for just the second time ever. Washington defeated then No. 20 ranked Boise State 24–10 on September 8, 2007 at Husky Stadium.
- Bishop Sankey was the first game MVP to play for the losing team.
- The same two teams met again when they opened the 2013 season in the renovated Husky Stadium on August 31, 2013, where Washington defeated Boise State 38–6.
