= George Blankley =

American football player and coach

Biographical details
- Born: October 7, 1918; Curwensville, Pennsylvania, U.S.
- Died: December 29, 2016 (aged 98); Madison, South Dakota, U.S.

Playing career

Football
- c. 1940: College of Idaho

Baseball
- c. 1940: College of Idaho
- 1941: Boise Pilots
- Position: End (football)

Coaching career (HC unless noted)

Football
- 1948–1949: Boise (assistant)
- 1950–1951: Boise
- 1962–1969: General Beadle / Dakota State

Basketball
- 1947–1948: Caldwell HS (ID)
- 1948–1962: Boise

Administrative career (AD unless noted)
- 1962–?: General Beadle / Dakota State

Head coaching record
- Overall: 28–40–1 (college football); 15–2 (junior college football); 206–139 (junior college basketball)

Accomplishments and honors

Championships
- Football; 2 ICAC (1950–1951) Basketball; 3 ICAC (1956–1958)

George C. Blankley (October 7, 1918 – December 29, 2016) was an American football and basketball coach and college athletics administrator. He served as the head basketball coach at Boise Junior College—now Boise State University—from 1948 to 1962, compiling a record of 206–139. Blankey was also the head football coach at Boise Junior College from the middle of the 1950 season through the 1951 season, assuming the responsibility after coach Lyle Smith was called into the United States Navy during the early part of the Korean War. Blankley compiled a record of 16–2 as head football coach of BJC. In 1962, he became the athletic director and head football coach at General Beadle State College—now known as Dakota State University—in Madison, South Dakota. He resigned as football coach following the 1969 season, compiling a record of 28–40–1 in eight seasons.

Blankley was born in Curwensville, Pennsylvania, and grew up playing football, basketball, and baseball. He attended the College of Idaho, where he played football, as an end, and baseball. Blankey graduated from college in 1941. He played minor league baseball with the Boise Pilots of the Pioneer Baseball League that year before becoming the athletic director and coach at Kuna High School. From 1943 to 1945, he taught physical education at his alma mater and then served as a physical trainer in the United States Marines. In 1948, Blankley coached basketball at Caldwell High School in Caldwell, Idaho.

The field at Brian Kern Family Stadium, home of the Dakota State Trojans football team, is named Blankley Field in his honor.

== Head coaching record ==
=== Junior college football ===
| Year | Team | Overall | Conference | Standing | Bowl/playoffs |
|---|---|---|---|---|---|
Boise Broncos (Intermountain Collegiate Athletic Conference) (1950–1951)
| 1950 | Boise (Note: Lyle Smith was head coach for the first three games of the 1950 season before being recalled to the Navy during the Korean War. Blankley coached the remainder of the 1950 season.) | 6–1 | 3–0 | 1st | L Junior Rose |
| 1951 | Boise | 9–1 | 4–0 | 1st | W Potato |
| Boise: | | 15–2 | 7–0 | | |
| Total: | | 15–2 | | | |
National championship Conference title Conference division title or championship game berth

=== College football ===
| Year | Team | Overall | Conference | Standing | Bowl/playoffs |
|---|---|---|---|---|---|
General Beadle / Dakota State Trojans (South Dakota Intercollegiate Conference) (1962–1969)
| 1962 | General Beadle | 5–4 | 3–3 | T–3rd | |
| 1963 | General Beadle | 3–5 | 2–4 | 5th | |
| 1964 | General Beadle | 1–7 | 1–5 | T–6th | |
| 1965 | General Beadle | 6–3 | 4–2 | T–2nd | |
| 1966 | General Beadle | 5–4 | 3–3 | 4th | |
| 1967 | General Beadle | 4–5 | 2–4 | T–4th | |
| 1968 | General Beadle | 2–5–1 | 1–4–1 | 6th | |
| 1969 | Dakota State | 2–7 | 1–5 | T–6th | |
| General Beadle / Dakota State: | | 28–40–1 | 17–30–1 | | |
| Total: | | 28–40–1 | | | |
