= Utah State Aggies football statistical leaders =

The Utah State Aggies football statistical leaders are individual statistical leaders of the Utah State Aggies football program in various categories, including passing, rushing, receiving, total offense, defensive stats, and kicking. Within those areas, the lists identify single-game, single-season, and career leaders. As of the upcoming 2026 season, the Aggies represent Utah State University in the NCAA Division I FBS Pac-12 Conference.

Although Utah State began competing in intercollegiate football in 1892, the school's official record book considers the "modern era" to have begun in 1956. Records from before this year are often incomplete and inconsistent, and they are generally not included in these lists.

These lists are dominated by more recent players for several reasons:

- Since 1956, seasons have increased from 10 games to 11 and then 12 games in length.
- The NCAA didn't allow freshmen to play varsity football until 1972 (with the exception of the World War II years), allowing players to have four-year careers.
- Bowl games only began counting toward single-season and career statistics in 2002. The Aggies have played in seven bowl games since this decision (all since 2011), giving many recent players an extra game to accumulate statistics.
- The Mountain West Conference, in which Utah State was a member from 2013 through 2025, has held a championship game since 2013. The Aggies played in this game in 2021, giving players in that season another game to amass statistics. Future players will have a similar opportunity since the Pac-12 will reinstate its championship game in 2026.
- In 2014, Utah State not only appeared in a bowl game but also played a 13-game regular season. The NCAA allows teams that play at Hawaii in a given season to schedule a 13th regular-season game. The Aggies played at Hawaii and chose to take advantage of this rule. (However, they did not play a 13th regular-season game in 2018, the next season in which they played at Hawaii.)

These lists are updated through the end of the 2025 season.

Note that recent Utah State football media guides have not included lists of top performances for most single-game records, instead listing only the record holder (ties included). Exceptions are single-game rushing, passing, and receiving yards, which each have a full top 20 list.

== Passing ==
=== Passing yards ===
Career
Rk	Player	Yards	Years
1	Jose Fuentes	9,168	1999 2000 2001 2002
2	Jordan Love	8,600	2017 2018 2019
3	Chuckie Keeton	7,393	2011 2012 2013 2014 2015
4	Diondre Borel	6,698	2007 2008 2009 2010
5	Tony Adams	6,226	1970 1971 1972
6	Kent Myers	6,126	2014 2015 2016 2017
7	Brent Snyder	6,105	1987 1988
8	Eric Hipple	6,073	1976 1977 1978 1979
9	Anthony Calvillo	5,642	1992 1993
10	Matt Sauk	5,385	1996 1997

Single season
Rk	Player	Yards	Year
1	Logan Bonner	3,628	2021
2	Jordan Love	3,567	2018
3	Jordan Love	3,402	2019
4	Chuckie Keeton	3,373	2012
5	Jose Fuentes	3,268	2002
6	Brent Snyder	3,218	1988
7	Anthony Calvillo	3,148	1993
8	Jose Fuentes	3,100	2001
9	Matt Sauk	2,896	1997
10	Brent Snyder	2,887	1987

Single game
Rk	Player	Yards	Year	Opponent
1	Tony Adams	561	1972	Utah
2	Jose Fuentes	509	2000	Boise State
3	Jordan Love	491	2018	San Jose State
4	Anthony Calvillo	472	1993	BYU
5	Spencer Petras	461	2024	UNLV
6	Jordan Love	448	2018	New Mexico
7	Jose Fuentes	437	2001	Weber State
8	Jose Fuentes	426	2002	Middle Tennessee
9	Anthony Calvillo	428	1992	Nevada
10	Jose Fuentes	421	2000	Idaho

=== Passing touchdowns ===
Career
Rk	Player	TDs	Years
1	Chuckie Keeton	62	2011 2012 2013 2014 2015
2	Jose Fuentes	60	1999 2000 2001 2002
	Jordan Love	60	2017 2018 2019
4	Tony Adams	52	1970 1971 1972
5	Logan Bonner	42	2021 2022
6	Brent Snyder	39	1987 1988
	Kent Myers	39	2014 2015 2016 2017
8	Diondre Borel	36	2007 2008 2009 2010
9	Anthony Calvillo	35	1992 1993
10	Eric Hipple	34	1976 1977 1978 1979

Single season
Rk	Player	TDs	Year
1	Logan Bonner	36	2021
2	Jordan Love	32	2018
3	Chuckie Keeton	27	2012
4	Jose Fuentes	24	2001
5	Tony Adams	22	1972
6	Bob Gagliano	20	1980
	Brent Snyder	20	1987
	Jose Fuentes	20	2002
	Jordan Love	20	2019
10	Brent Snyder	19	1988
	Anthony Calvillo	19	1993
	Cooper Legas	19	2023

Single game
Rk	Player	TDs	Year	Opponent
1	Tony Adams	5	1972	Idaho
	Tony Adams	5	1972	Utah
	Brent Snyder	5	1987	Utah
	Anthony Calvillo	5	1992	Nevada
	Anthony Calvillo	5	1993	BYU
	Chuckie Keeton	5	2011	Wyoming
	Chuckie Keeton	5	2013	Air Force
	Chuckie Keeton	5	2013	Weber State
	Jordan Love	5	2018	UNLV
	Jordan Love	5	2018	San Jose State
	Logan Bonner	5	2021	New Mexico

== Rushing ==
=== Rushing yards ===
Career
Rk	Player	Yards	Years
1	Demario Brown	4,053	1996 1997 1998 1999
2	Abu Wilson	3,933	1992 1994 1995 1996
3	Rick Parros	3,537	1976 1977 1978 1979
4	Louie Giammona	3,499	1973 1974 1975
5	Robert Turbin	3,315	2007 2008 2009 2011
6	Emmett White	2,791	1998 1999 2000 2001
7	Kerwynn Williams	2,515	2009 2010 2011 2012
8	Roger Grant	2,387	1990 1991
9	Tom Larscheid	2,206	1959 1960 1961
10	Gerold Bright	2,145	2016 2017 2018 2019

Single season
Rk	Player	Yards	Year
1	Demario Brown	1,536	1999
2	Louie Giammona	1,534	1974
3	Robert Turbin	1,517	2011
4	Kerwynn Williams	1,512	2012
5	Abu Wilson	1,476	1995
6	Louie Giammona	1,454	1975
7	Roger Grant	1,370	1990
8	Emmett White	1,361	2001
9	Emmett White	1,322	2000
10	Robert Turbin	1,296	2009

Single game
Rk	Player	Yards	Year	Opponent
1	Emmett White	322	2000	New Mexico State
2	Roger Grant	292	1990	Long Beach State
3	Emmett White	274	2001	Wyoming
4	Demario Brown	253	1999	Nevada
5	Rick Parros	252	1978	Fresno State
6	Abu Wilson	251	1995	UNLV
7	Louie Giammona	247	1974	Idaho
8	Jay Van Noy	242	1948	Arizona State
	Louie Giammona	242	1975	Colorado State
10	Demario Brown	239	1999	Boise State

=== Rushing touchdowns ===
Career
Rk	Player	TDs	Years
1	Abu Wilson	40	1992 1994 1995 1996
	Robert Turbin	40	2007 2008 2009 2011
3	Demario Brown	37	1996 1997 1998 1999
4	Tom Larscheid	29	1959 1960 1961
5	Emmett White	27	1998 1999 2000 2001
6	Rick Parros	26	1976 1977 1978 1979
7	Kerwynn Williams	22	2009 2010 2011 2012
	Gerold Bright	22	2016 2017 2018 2019
9	Louie Giammona	21	1973 1974 1975
10	Roy Shivers	18	1964 1965

Single season
Rk	Player	TDs	Year
1	Robert Turbin	19	2011
2	Abu Wilson	16	1996
3	Rick Parros	15	1979
	Abu Wilson	15	1995
	Kerwynn Williams	15	2012
6	Jack Hill	14	1956
	Roy Shivers	14	1965
	Demario Brown	14	1999
	Darwin Thompson	14	2018
10	Tom Larscheid	13	1960
	Emmett White	13	2000
	Emmett White	13	2001
	Robert Turbin	13	2009
	Joey DeMartino	13	2013

Single game
Rk	Player	TDs	Year	Opponent
1	Jack Hill	5	1956	Drake

== Receiving ==
=== Receptions ===
Career
Rk	Player	Rec	Years
1	Kevin Robinson	178	2004 2005 2006 2007
2	Kevin Curtis	174	2001 2002
3	Deven Thompkins	171	2018 2019 2020 2021
4	Kendal Smith	169	1985 1986 1987 1988
5	Ron'quavion Tarver	160	2016 2017 2018
6	Nakia Jenkins	155	1996 1997
7	Rod Moore	153	1988 1989 1990 1991
8	Kevin Alexander	149	1992 1993 1994 1995
9	Pat Newman	145	1986 1987 1988 1989
	Aaron Jones	145	1997 1998 1999 2000
	Terrell Vaughn	145	2022 2023

Single season
Rk	Player	Rec	Year
1	Deven Thompkins	102	2021
2	Kevin Curtis	100	2001
3	Kevin Alexander	92	1995
4	Terrell Vaughn	89	2023
5	Tom Forzani	85	1972
6	Nakia Jenkins	82	1996
7	Brian Cobbs	76	2022
8	Kevin Curtis	74	2002
9	Nakia Jenkins	73	1997
10	Hunter Sharp	71	2015
	Jalen Royals	71	2023

Single game
Rk	Player	Rec	Year	Opponent
1	Tom Forzani	15	1972	Idaho
2	Deven Thompkins	12	2021	UNLV
	Terrell Vaughn	12	2023	Iowa

=== Receiving yards ===
Career
Rk	Player	Yards	Years
1	Kendal Smith	2,943	1985 1986 1987 1988
2	Kevin Curtis	2,789	2001 2002
3	Deven Thompkins	2,519	2018 2019 2020 2021
4	Kevin Robinson	2,485	2004 2005 2006 2007
5	Nakia Jenkins	2,483	1996 1997
6	Rod Moore	2,422	1988 1989 1990 1991
7	Aaron Jones	2,334	1997 1998 1999 2000
8	Pat Newman	2,221	1986 1987 1988 1989
9	Kevin Alexander	2,208	1992 1993 1994 1995
10	James Murphy	2,132	1978 1979 1980

Single season
Rk	Player	Yards	Year
1	Deven Thompkins	1,704	2021
2	Kevin Curtis	1,531	2001
3	Kevin Alexander	1,400	1995
4	Nakia Jenkins	1,397	1996
5	Kevin Curtis	1,258	2002
6	Kendal Smith	1,196	1988
7	Tom Forzani	1,169	1972
8	Aaron Jones	1,159	2000
9	Nakia Jenkins	1,086	1997
10	Jalen Royals	1,080	2023

Single game
Rk	Player	Yards	Year	Opponent
1	Aaron Jones	297	2000	Boise State
2	Kevin Curtis	252	2001	Weber State
3	Kevin Alexander	243	1995	Pacific
4	Kevin Alexander	236	1995	Nevada
5	Aaron Jones	233	2000	Idaho
6	Craig Clark	224	1972	Utah
7	Kevin Curtis	221	2001	South Florida
8	Rod Moore	220	1991	Nebraska
9	James Murphy	215	1979	Long Beach State
	Deven Thompkins	215	2021	New Mexico State

=== Receiving touchdowns ===
Career
Rk	Player	TDs	Years
1	Kendal Smith	25	1985 1986 1987 1988
2	Tracy Jenkins	22	1988 1989 1990 1991
3	Aaron Jones	21	1997 1998 1999 2000
	Kevin Robinson	21	2004 2005 2006 2007
	Jalen Royals	21	2023 2024
6	Ken Thompson	19	1979 1980
	Kevin Curtis	19	2001 2002
8	Ron'quavion Tarver	18	2016 2017 2018
9	James Murphy	17	1978 1979 1980
	Pat Newman	17	1986 1987 1988 1989

Single season
Rk	Player	TDs	Year
1	Jalen Royals	15	2023
2	Tracy Jenkins	14	1990
3	Mike O'Shea	11	1968
	Ken Thompson	11	1979
	Kendal Smith	11	1988
	Aaron Jones	11	2000
	Derek Wright	11	2021
	Terrell Vaughn	11	2023
9	James Murphy	10	1980
	Rod Moore	10	1991
	Kevin Curtis	10	2001
	Siaosi Mariner	10	2019
	Deven Thompkins	10	2021
	Brandon Bowling	10	2021

Single game
Rk	Player	TDs	Year	Opponent
1	Ken Thompson	4	1979	Utah

== Total offense ==
Total offense is the sum of passing and rushing statistics. It does not include receiving or returns.

=== Total offense yards ===
Career
Rk	Player	Yards	Years
1	Jordan Love	9,003	2017 2018 2019
2	Chuckie Keeton	8,808	2011 2012 2013 2014 2015
3	Jose Fuentes	8,791	1999 2000 2001 2002
4	Diondre Borel	8,096	2007 2008 2009 2010
5	Kent Myers	7,532	2014 2015 2016 2017
6	Tony Adams	6,587	1970 1971 1972
7	Eric Hipple	6,121	1976 1977 1978 1979
8	Brent Snyder	5,928	1987 1988
9	Anthony Calvillo	5,838	1992 1993
10	Matt Sauk	5,466	1996 1997

Single season
Rk	Player	Yards	Year
1	Chuckie Keeton	3,992	2012
2	Logan Bonner	3,694	2021
3	Jordan Love	3,630	2018
4	Jordan Love	3,577	2019
5	Bryson Barnes	3,543	2025
6	Diondre Borel	3,343	2009
7	Anthony Calvillo	3,260	1993
8	Jose Fuentes	3,164	2002
9	Brent Snyder	3,154	1988
10	Tony Adams	2,953	1972

Single game
Rk	Player	Yards	Year	Opponent
1	Anthony Calvillo	537	1993	BYU

=== Total touchdowns ===
Utah State media guides as recently as 2016 listed the career top 5 for this statistic, which the program calls "touchdowns responsible". However, the 2018 media guide lists only the career record holder. All recent media guides have listed only the single-season and single-game record holders for this statistic.

Interestingly, the 2018 media guide lists a full top 10 in career and single-season touchdowns scored, which is an entirely different statistical measure. That metric includes rushing, receiving, and return touchdowns, but not passing touchdowns.

Career
Rk	Player	TDs	Years
1	Chuckie Keeton	74	2011 2012 2013 2014 2015
2	Jordan Love	69	2017 2018 2019
3	Tony Adams	62	1970 1971 1972
4	Jose Fuentes	60	1999 2000 2001 2002
5	Diondre Borel	54	2007 2008 2009 2010

Single season
Rk	Player	TDs	Year
1	Jordan Love	39	2018
2	Logan Bonner	36	2021
3	Chuckie Keeton	35	2012

Single game
Rk	Player	TDs	Year	Opponent
1	Anthony Calvillo	7	1993	BYU
2	Jordan Love	6	2018	San Jose State

== Defense ==
=== Interceptions ===
Career
Rk	Player	Ints	Years
1	Henry King	18	1965 1966
2	Damon Smith	17	1990 1991 1992 1993
3	Donald Toomer	12	1991 1992 1993 1994
4	Chuck Detwiler	11	1966 1967 1968
	Ronnie McCloud	11	1974 1976 1977 1978
	Travis Clark	11	1987 1989
	Jalen Davis	11	2014 2015 2016 2017
8	Grant Martinsen	10	1964 1965 1966
	Wendell Brook	10	1970 1971
	Phillip Shelley	10	1971 1972
	Tom Bates	10	1979 1980 1981 1982
	Darrin Long	10	1984 1985 1986 1987
	Ronald Edwards	10	1988 1989 1990 1991

Single season
Rk	Player	Ints	Year
1	Henry King	11	1966
2	Rob Fuhriman	8	1973
3	Henry King	7	1965
	Ronald Edwards	7	1991
	Frankie Sutera	7	2014

Single game
Rk	Player	Ints	Year	Opponent
1	Henry King	4	1966	Pacific

=== Tackles ===
Career
Rk	Player	Tackles	Years
1	Del Lyles	446	1988 1989 1990 1991
	Bobby Wagner	446	2008 2009 2010 2011
3	David Gill	425	1993 1994 1995 1996
4	Jesse Busta	392	1999 2000 2001 2002
5	Zach Vigil	389	2011 2012 2013 2014
6	Brent Passey	386	1997 1998 1999 2000
7	Kevin Bouwman	372	1987 1988 1989 1990
8	Pat McKenna	359	1979 1980 1981 1982
9	Johndale Carty	347	1995 1996 1997 1998
10	Jermaine Younger	337	1990 1991 1992 1993

Single season
Rk	Player	Tackles	Year
1	Tony D'Amato	170	1998
2	David Gill	168	1995
3	Al Smith	166	1986
4	Zach Vigil	156	2014
5	David Gill	150	1996
6	Jake Doughty	148	2013
7	Bobby Wagner	147	2011
8	Nick Vigil	144	2015
9	Brent Passey	142	1999
	MJ Tafisi Jr.	142	2023

Single game
Rk	Player	Tackles	Year	Opponent
1	Brian Longuevan	26	1974	Weber State

=== Sacks ===
Career
Rk	Player	Sacks	Years
1	Mark Mraz	36.0	1983 1984 1985 1986

Single season
Rk	Player	Sacks	Year
1	Mark Mraz	16.0	1985

Single game
Rk	Player	Sacks	Year	Opponent
1	Danilo Robinson	5.0	1995	San Jose State

== Special teams ==
=== Field goals made ===
Career
Rk	Player	FGs	Years
1	Dominik Eberle	64	2016 2017 2018 2019
2	Brad Bohn	59	1997 1998 1999 2000
3	Micah Knorr	39	1993 1994 1995 1996
	Nick Diaz	39	2010 2012 2013 2014
5	Steve Steinke	38	1977 1978 1979 1980
6	Willie Beecher	36	1981 1982 1983 1984
7	Dene Garner	35	1985 1986 1987
	Connor Coles	35	2018 2020 2021 2022
9	Peter Caldwell	33	2007 2008 2009 2010
10	Al Knapp	26	1973 1974

Single season
Rk	Player	FGs	Year
1	Brad Bohn	24	1998
2	Dominik Eberle	22	2018
3	Dominik Eberle	21	2019
4	Connor Coles	20	2021
5	Nathan Morreale	19	1993
6	Steve Steinke	18	1978
	Sean Jones	18	1992
	Dominik Eberle	18	2017
9	Nick Diaz	17	2013
10	Al Knapp	16	1974
	Dene Garner	16	1985

Single game
Rk	Player	FGs	Year	Opponent
1	Dominik Eberle	6	2018	New Mexico State
2	Dene Garner	5	1985	San Jose State
	Brad Bohn	5	1998	North Texas
	Brad Bohn	5	1998	New Mexico

=== Field goal percentage ===
Utah State requires 10 attempts to qualify for the single-season accuracy record, and 20 attempts to qualify for the career record.

Career
Rk	Player	FG%	Years
1	Russ Moody	84.6%	1988 1989
2	Dominik Eberle	79.0%	2016 2017 2018 2019
3	Doug Beach	75.9%	1990 1991 1992
4	Nick Diaz	73.6%	2010 2012 2013 2014
5	Connor Coles	71.4%	2018 2020 2021 2022
6	Dane Kidman	71.0%	1999 2000 2001 2002
7	Brock Warren	70.8%	2010 2012 2015 2016
8	Nathan Morreale	70.4%	1993 1994 1995 1996
9	Peter Caldwell	68.8%	2007 2008 2009 2010
10	Willie Beecher	66.7%	1981 1982 1983 1984
	Elliott Nimrod	66.7%	2022 2023 2024

Single season
Rk	Player	FG%	Year
1	Dominik Eberle	87.5%	2019
2	Russ Moody	86.7%	1988
3	Brad Bohn	85.7%	1998
4	Peter Caldwell	83.3%	2008
5	Doug Beach	82.4%	1990
	Dane Kidman	82.4%	2002
7	Russ Moody	81.8%	1989
8	Dene Garner	80.0%	1985
9	Dominik Eberle	78.6%	2018
	Elliott Nimrod	78.6%	2023
