= List of Utah State Aggies football seasons =

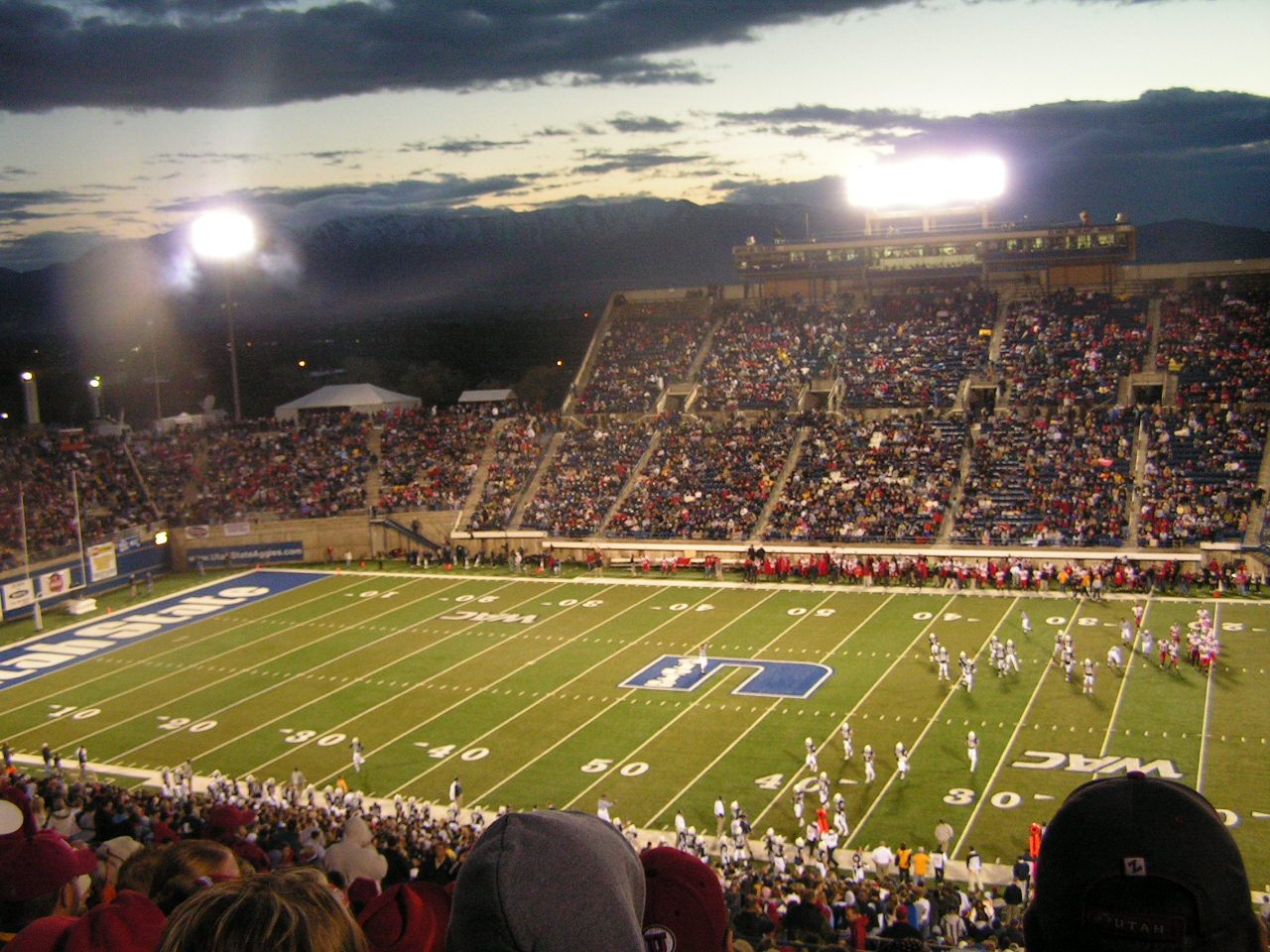
Maverik Stadium, the home of Utah State football since 1968.

This is a list of Utah State Aggies football seasons. The Aggies are part of the National Collegiate Athletic Association (NCAA) Division I Football Bowl Subdivision (FBS). Since their inception in 1892, the Aggies have played in over 1,000 games through over a century of play along with 17 bowl games (15 sanctioned by the NCAA), with interruptions occurring from 1893–95, 1897, 1918, and 1943.

The Aggies have participated in six football conferences in their tenure, with the first being the Rocky Mountain Athletic Conference, which they joined in 1916. They joined the Mountain States Conference (also known as the Skyline Conference) in 1938. They became independent after the 1961 season, continuing that way until 1978, when they joined the Pacific Coast Athletic Association (renamed the Big West Conference in 1988). They left the conference after the 2000 season, lurking as an independent for two seasons until joining the Sun Belt Conference in 2003. After two seasons, they left the conference for the Western Athletic Conference in 2005. They joined the Mountain West Conference in 2013. Utah State has had 33 head coaches over its tenure, with the first being an unidentified coach who coached them for the inaugural season in 1892 and the most recent being Bronco Mendenhall, who has coached the team since the 2025 season.

== Seasons ==
Year	Coach	Overall	Conference	Standing	Bowl/playoffs	Coaches^{#}	AP^{°}
Independent (1892–1913)
1892	No coach	1–0					
1896	Professor Mayo	0–1					
1898	Lt. Dunning	0–1					
1899	Willard Langton	1–0					
1900	Willard Langton	0–1					
1901	Dick Richards	3–2–1					
1902	George P. Campbell	0–4					
1903	George P. Campbell	3–0					
1904	George P. Campbell	4–8					
1905	George P. Campbell	2–2–1					
1906	George P. Campbell	3–1					
1907	Mysterious Walker	7–0					
1908	Mysterious Walker	4–2					
1909	Clayton Teetzel	2–2–1					
1910	Clayton Teetzel	5–2					
1911	Clayton Teetzel	5–0					
1912	Clayton Teetzel	4–2–1					
1913	Clayton Teetzel	3–3					
Rocky Mountain Athletic Conference (1914–1937)
1914	Clayton Teetzel	2–5					
1915	Clayton Teetzel	3–4					
1916	Jack Watson	1–5–1	0–3	8th			
1917	Jack Watson	7–0–1	4–0	T–1st			
1919	Dick Romney	5–2	2–2	T–4th			
1920	Dick Romney	4–2–1	2–1	4th			
1921	Dick Romney	7–1	3–0	1st			
1922	Dick Romney	5–4	3–3	T–5th			
1923	Dick Romney	5–2	4–2	4th			
1924	Dick Romney	4–2–1	3–2–1	4th			
1925	Dick Romney	6–1	5–1	T–2nd			
1926	Dick Romney	5–1–2	4–1–2	3rd			
1927	Dick Romney	3–4–1	3–3	7th			
1928	Dick Romney	5–3–1	4–2–1	4th			
1929	Dick Romney	3–4	3–4	9th			
1930	Dick Romney	3–5–1	3–4–1	8th			
1931	Dick Romney	6–2	5–2	2nd			
1932	Dick Romney	4–4	3–3	6th			
1933	Dick Romney	4–4	4–3	6th			
1934	Dick Romney	5–1–1	5–1–1	4th			
1935	Dick Romney	5–2–1	5–1–1	T–1st			
1936	Dick Romney	7–0–1	6–0–1	1st			
1937	Dick Romney	2–4–2	2–4–1	T–7th			
Mountain States/Skyline Conference (1938–1961)
1938	Dick Romney	4–4	3–3	5th			
1939	Dick Romney	3–4–1	2–3–1	5th			
1940	Dick Romney	2–5–1	2–4	5th			
1941	Dick Romney	0–8	0–6	7th			
1942	Dick Romney	6–3–1	2–3–1	4th			
1944	Dick Romney	3–3	0–2	4th			
1945	Dick Romney	4–3	1–3	4th			
1946	Dick Romney	7–2–1	4–1–1	T–1st	L Raisin		
1947	Dick Romney	6–5	3–3	T–3rd	L Grape		
1948	Dick Romney	5–6	2–4	T–2nd			
1949	George Melinkovich	3–7	1–3	5th			
1950	George Melinkovich	2–9	0–5	6th			
1951	John Roning	3–5–1	2–4–1	6th			
1952	John Roning	3–7–1	3–4	T–5th			
1953	John Roning	8–3	5–2	2nd			
1954	John Roning	4–6	4–3	3rd			
1955	Ev Faunce	4–6	3–4	5th			
1956	Ev Faunce	6–4	4–3	T–3rd			
1957	Ev Faunce	2–7–1	1–5–1	8th			
1958	Ev Faunce	3–7	2–5	T–6th			
1959	John Ralston	5–6	2–5	T–5th			
1960	John Ralston	9–2	6–1	T–1st	L Sun		
1961	John Ralston	9–1–1	5–0–1	T–1st	L Gotham	10	10
Independent (1962–1977)
1962	John Ralston	8–2					
1963	Tony Knap	8–2					
1964	Tony Knap	5–4–1					
1965	Tony Knap	8–2					
1966	Tony Knap	4–6					
1967	Chuck Mills	7–2–1					
1968	Chuck Mills	7–3					
1969	Chuck Mills	3–7					
1970	Chuck Mills	5–5–1					
1971	Chuck Mills	8–3					
1972	Chuck Mills	8–3				19	
1973	Phil Krueger	7–4					
1974	Phil Krueger	8–3					
1975	Phil Krueger	6–5					
1976	Bruce Snyder	3–8					
1977	Bruce Snyder	4–7					
Big West Conference (1978–2000)
1978	Bruce Snyder	7–4	4–1	T–1st			
1979	Bruce Snyder	8–2–1	4–0–1	T–1st			
1980	Bruce Snyder	6–5	4–1	2nd			
1981	Bruce Snyder	5–5–1	4–1	2nd			
1982	Bruce Snyder	5–6	2–3	T–4th			
1983	Chris Pella	5–6	3–3	T–3rd			
1984	Chris Pella	1–10	1–5	T–7th			
1985	Chris Pella	3–8	3–4	5th			
1986	Chuck Shelton	3–8	3–4	T–4th			
1987	Chuck Shelton	5–6	4–3	T–2nd			
1988	Chuck Shelton	4–7	4–3	T–3rd			
1989	Chuck Shelton	4–7	4–3	4th			
1990	Chuck Shelton	5–5–1	5–1–1	T–2nd			
1991	Chuck Shelton	5–6	5–2	3rd			
1992	Charlie Weatherbie	5–6	4–2	T–2nd			
1993	Charlie Weatherbie	7–5	3–1	T–1st	W Las Vegas		
1994	Charlie Weatherbie	3–8	1–3	T–7th			
1995	John L. Smith	4–7	3–2	T–2nd			
1996	John L. Smith	6–5	4–1	T–1st			
1997	John L. Smith	6–5	4–1	T–1st	L Humanitarian		
1998	Dave Arslanian	3–8	2–3	T–4th			
1999	Dave Arslanian	4–7	3–3	T–3rd			
2000	Mick Dennehy	5–6	4–1	2nd			
Independent (2001–2002)
2001	Mick Dennehy	4–7					
2002	Mick Dennehy	4–7					
Sun Belt Conference (2003–2004)
2003	Mick Dennehy	3–9	3–4	T–4th			
2004	Mick Dennehy	3–8	2–5	T–7th			
Western Athletic Conference (2005–2012)
2005	Brent Guy	3–8	2–6	T–6th			
2006	Brent Guy	1–11	1–7	T–8th			
2007	Brent Guy	2–10	2–6	7th			
2008	Brent Guy	3–9	3–5	7th			
2009	Gary Andersen	4–8	3–5	T–5th			
2010	Gary Andersen	4–8	2–6	7th			
2011	Gary Andersen	7–6	5–2	T–2nd	L Famous Idaho Potato		
2012	Gary Andersen	11–2	6–0	1st	W Famous Idaho Potato	18	16
Mountain West Conference (2013–2025)
2013	Matt Wells	9–5	7–1	1st	W Poinsettia		
2014	Matt Wells	10–4	6–2	3rd	W New Mexico		
2015	Matt Wells	6–7	5–3	T–2nd (Mountain)	L Famous Idaho Potato		
2016	Matt Wells	3–9	1–7	6th (Mountain)			
2017	Matt Wells	6–7	4–4	4th (Mountain)	L Arizona		
2018	Matt Wells	11–2	7–1	T-1st (Mountain)	W New Mexico	21	22
2019	Gary Andersen	7–6	6–2	3rd (Mountain)	L Frisco		
2020	Gary Andersen; Frank Maile	1–5	1–5	11th (Mountain)			
2021	Blake Anderson	11–3	6–2	1st (Mountain)	W LA	24	24
2022	Blake Anderson	6–7	5–3	4th (Mountain)	L First Responder		
2023	Blake Anderson	6–7	4–4	T–6th	L Famous Idaho Potato		
2024	Nate Dreiling	4–8	3–4	T–7th			
2025	Bronco Mendenhall	6–6	4–4	7th	Famous Idaho Potato		
Total:		582–568–31 (.504)					
National championship Conference title Conference division title or championship game berth
^{#}Rankings from final Coaches Poll.
