= 2012 Famous Idaho Potato Bowl =

Toledo Rockets	Utah State Aggies
(9–3)	(10–2)
MAC	WAC
15	41
Head coach: Matt Campbell	Head coach: Gary Andersen
	AP / Coaches / BCS; 18 / 20 / 22
	1	2	3	4	Total
Toledo	3	3	0	9	15
Utah State	7	3	3	28	41
- Date: December 15, 2012
- Season: 2012
- Stadium: Bronco Stadium
- Location: Boise, Idaho
- MVP: Bernard Reedy Toledo Wide Receiver; Kerwynn Williams Utah State Running Back
- Favorite: Utah St. by 10
- Referee: Eddie Shelton (MWC)
- Attendance: 29,243
- Payout: US$650,000

United States TV coverage
- Network: ESPN
- Announcers: Tom Hart (Play-by-play); Mike Bellotti (Analyst); Quint Kessenich (Sideline)

The 2012 Famous Idaho Potato Bowl was a post-season American college football bowl game held on December 15, 2012 at Bronco Stadium in Boise, Idaho in the United States. The sixteenth edition of the Famous Idaho Potato Bowl began at 2:30 p.m. MST and aired on ESPN. It featured the Toledo Rockets from the Mid-American Conference against the Western Athletic Conference champion Utah State Aggies, and was the final game of the 2012 NCAA Division I FBS football season for both teams. The Rockets accepted their invitation after earning a 9–2 record in the regular season, while the Aggies accepted theirs after earning a 10–2 record. Utah State won the game 41–15.

== Teams ==
Since 2001, the Famous Idaho Potato Bowl has given an automatic bid to a team from the Western Athletic Conference. However, this was the final year of the bid, as the WAC ceased sponsorship of football following the season. Coincidentally, the WAC's bid was given after the Big West Conference (whose champion had the automatic bid) ceased sponsoring football following the 2000 game.

The Mid-American Conference has held their automatic bid since 2010, following the Toronto-based International Bowl ceasing operations.

This was the first meeting between these two teams.

=== Toledo ===
In one of the more successful seasons in the conference's history, the Rockets were one of the MAC's more successful teams, finishing with a 6–2 conference record, good for a tie for second place in the West Division (though losing the tiebreaker to the Ball State Cardinals). After the season, the Rockets accepted their invitation to the 2012 Famous Idaho Potato Bowl.

This would be the Rockets' first Famous Idaho Potato Bowl.

=== Utah State ===
The Aggies came off of one of their most successful seasons in school history, finishing 6–0 in WAC play and winning the conference's final outright championship. In fact, the Aggies' only two losses of the season by a margin of no more than three points (to the Wisconsin Badgers by a score of 16–14 and their Old Wagon Wheel rivals the BYU Cougars by a score of 6–3). After defeating the Idaho Vandals to finish their regular season record at 10–2 (winning ten games for the first time in school history), the Aggies accepted the fourth invitation of the 2012–13 NCAA Bowl season to the 2012 Famous Idaho Potato Bowl.

This would be the Aggies' third Famous Idaho Potato Bowl, following the inaugural 1997 game against the Cincinnati Bearcats as well as the 2011 game against the Ohio Bobcats, both of which the Aggies lost. It would also be the Aggies' final game as a member of the WAC before they moved to the Mountain West Conference in 2013.

== Game summary ==
First quarter

Toledo got the ball to start the game and executed a 5-play, 49-yard drive that resulted in a 37-yard field goal by Jeremiah Detmer for the first points of the game. On the ensuing Utah State drive, the Aggies managed one first down prior to punting away after two plays for losses of yardage as well as an illegal substitution penalty. Later in the quarter, Utah State got the ball back and executed a drive that culminated with a 62-yard rushing touchdown by Chuckie Keeton. That was the last score of the quarter.

Second quarter

The second quarter began with a 9-play, 50-yard drive for Toledo that was capped off with a 37-yard field goal by Detmer, his second of the game from that distance. After exchanging punts, Utah State executed an 86-yard drive in the final 1:39 that resulted in a successful 27-yard field goal by Nick Diaz.

Third quarter

Since Toledo got the ball at the start of the game, Utah State got possession at the beginning of the second half. Like Toledo did on the first drive of the first half, Utah State marched down the field but settled for a field goal after an 8-play, 45-yard drive. The ensuing Toledo drive ended with an interception, but Utah State failed to capitalize and ended up punting it back to Toledo. Heading into the fourth quarter, the score remained 13–6 Utah State.

Fourth quarter

Toledo began the quarter by putting together a 14-play, 74-yard drive. Since they were down by seven points, however, they decided to go for it on fourth and one at the Utah State nine-yard line, but were stopped short by the Utah State defense. After a Utah State fumble on their ensuing possession, Toledo was able to score on a 29-yard field goal by Detmer. The next three drives for Utah State all ended the same way, a Kerwynn Williams touchdown run. In the course of three minutes, Williams ran for three touchdowns to put Utah State on top 41-15, which would end up being the final score.

=== Scoring summary ===
Scoring summary

Quarter	Time	Drive			Team	Scoring information	Score	
Quarter	Time	Plays	Yards	TOP	Team	Scoring information	Toledo	Utah State
1	13:06	5	49	1:54	Toledo	37-yard field goal by Jeremiah Detmer	3	0
1	3:07	6	85	2:29	Utah State	Chuckie Keeton 65-yard touchdown run, Nick Diaz kick good	3	7
2	9:57	9	50	4:54	Toledo	37-yard field goal by Jeremiah Detmer	6	7
2	0:00	7	86	1:39	Utah State	27-yard field goal by Nick Diaz	6	10
3	11:12	7	35	3:48	Utah State	44-yard field goal by Nick Diaz	6	13
4	7:28	7	35	1:42	Toledo	29-yard field goal by Jeremiah Detmer	9	13
4	6:57	2	70	0:31	Utah State	Kerwynn Williams 63-yard touchdown run, Nick Diaz kick good	9	20
4	6:57	3	62	1:31	Utah State	Kerwynn Williams 5-yard touchdown run, Nick Diaz kick good	9	27
4	3:41	2	39	0:40	Utah State	Kerwynn Williams 25-yard touchdown run, Nick Diaz kick good	9	34
4	3:29	2	87	0:12	Toledo	Bernard Reedy 87-yard kickoff return for a Touchdown, 2-point conversion pass from Terrance Owens incomplete	15	34
4	1:29	2	56	0:42	Utah State	Joe Hill 24-yard touchdown run, Nick Diaz kick good	15	41
"TOP" = time of possession. For other American football terms, see Glossary of American football.							15	41

=== Statistics ===
Statistics	Toledo	Utah State
First downs	18	22
Total offense, plays - yards	76-315	62-582
Rushes-yards (net)	37-142	31-353
Passing yards (net)	173	229
Passes, Comp-Att-Int	19-39-173	21-31-229
Time of Possession	35:55	24:05

Passing

- Toledo- Austin Dantin: 12/21, 132 yards, 0 TD, 2 INT
- Utah State- Chuckie Keeton: 21/31, 229 yards

Rushing

- Toledo- Bernard Reedy: 10 rushes, 50 yards
- Utah State- Kerwynn Williams: 18 rushes, 235 yards, 3 TD

Receiving

- Toledo- Bernard Reedy: 6 receptions, 62 yards
- Utah State- Matt Austin: 6 receptions, 77 yards
