= José Fuentes =

José Fuentes may refer to:

- José Luis Fuentes (born 1985), Venezuelan gymnast
- José Fuentes (judoka) (born 1960), Puerto Rican judoka
- José Francisco Fuentes (?–2009), Mexican politician
- Jose Dolores Fuentes, meteorologist at Pennsylvania State University
- José Fuentes Mares (1918–1986), Mexican writer, namesake of the José Fuentes Mares National Prize for Literature
- Jose Fuentes (quarterback) (born c. 1981), former American football quarterback
