= 2000 Utah State Aggies football team =

American college football season

2000 Utah State Aggies football
- Conference: Big West Conference
- Record: 5–6 (4–1 Big West)
- Head coach: Mick Dennehy (1st season)
- Offensive coordinator: Bob Cole (1st season)
- Defensive coordinator: Kraig Paulson (1st season)
- Home stadium: Romney Stadium

2000 Big West Conference football standings
	Conf.			Overall
Team	W		L	W		L
Boise State $	5	–	0	10	–	2
Utah State	4	–	1	5	–	6
Idaho	3	–	2	5	–	6
New Mexico State	1	–	4	3	–	8
North Texas	1	–	4	3	–	8
Arkansas State	1	–	4	1	–	10
$ – Conference champion

The 2000 Utah State Aggies football team represented Utah State University in the 2000 NCAA Division I-A football season as a member of the Big West Conference. The Aggies were led by first-year head coach Mick Dennehy. The Aggies played their home games at Romney Stadium in Logan, Utah. Utah State finished with a 5–6 record.

Junior running back Emmett White led the country with an average of 238.9 all-purpose yards per game; his average was also the sixth highest in NCAA history at that time. On November 4, 2000, in a victory over New Mexico State, White also broke an NCAA single-game record with 578 all-purpose yards and also set a new Utah State single-game record with 332 rushing yards.

== Schedule ==
Date	Opponent	Site	Result	Attendance	Source
September 2	at Texas Tech*	Jones SBC Stadium; Lubbock, TX	L 16–38	35,913	
September 9	Southern Utah*	Romney Stadium; Logan, UT	W 30–14	26,715	
September 23	at Arizona State*	Sun Devil Stadium; Tempe, AZ	L 20–44	46,327	
September 30	Utah*	Romney Stadium; Logan, UT (Battle of the Brothers, Beehive Boot)	L 14–35	29,814	
October 6	at BYU*	Cougar Stadium; Provo, UT (The Old Wagon Wheel)	L 14–38	63,318	
October 14	at North Texas	Fouts Field; Denton, TX	W 17–12	15,073	
October 21	Idaho	Romney Stadium; Logan, UT	W 31–14	14,217	
October 28	Arkansas State	Romney Stadium; Logan, UT	W 44–31	14,926	
November 4	at New Mexico State	Aggie Memorial Stadium; Las Cruces, NM	W 44–37	10,213	
November 11	at Boise State	Bronco Stadium; Boise, ID	L 38–66	27,206	
November 18	Idaho State*	Romney Stadium; Logan, UT	L 24–27	13,877	
*Non-conference game
