= 2000 Boise State Broncos football team =

American college football season

2000 Boise State Broncos football

Big West champion Humanitarian Bowl champion

Humanitarian Bowl, W 38–23 vs. UTEP
- Conference: Big West Conference
- Record: 10–2 (5–0 Big West)
- Head coach: Dirk Koetter (3rd season)
- Offensive coordinator: Dan Hawkins (3rd season)
- Defensive coordinator: Brent Guy (3rd season)
- Home stadium: Bronco Stadium

2000 Big West Conference football standings
	Conf.			Overall
Team	W		L	W		L
Boise State $	5	–	0	10	–	2
Utah State	4	–	1	5	–	6
Idaho	3	–	2	5	–	6
New Mexico State	1	–	4	3	–	8
North Texas	1	–	4	3	–	8
Arkansas State	1	–	4	1	–	10
$ – Conference champion

The 2000 Boise State Broncos football team represented Boise State University as a member of the Big West Conference during the 2000 NCAA Division I-A football season. Led by Dirk Koetter in his third and final year as head coach, the Broncos compiled an overall record of 10–2 with a mark of 5–0 in conference play, winning the Big West title for the second consecutive season. Boise State was invited to the Humanitarian Bowl, where the Broncos defeated UTEP. The team played home games on campus, at Bronco Stadium in Boise, Idaho.

2000 was Boise State's final season in the Big West, which ceased to sponsor football. The Broncos as they joined the Western Athletic Conference in 2001. At the end of the regular season, Koetter resigned to become the head coach at Arizona State University, but stayed on to coach in the Broncos' bowl game. Koetter was succeeded as head coach by the team's offensive coordinator, Dan Hawkins.

== Schedule ==
Date	Time	Opponent	Site	TV	Result	Attendance	Source
September 2	6:00 pm	at New Mexico*	University Stadium; Albuquerque, NM		W 31–14	22,090	
September 9	7:00 pm	No. 11 (FCS) Northern Iowa*	Bronco Stadium; Boise, ID		W 42–17	26,490	
September 16	6:00 pm	at Arkansas*	War Memorial Stadium; Little Rock, AR		L 31–38	54,286	
September 23	1:00 pm	at Central Michigan*	Kelly/Shorts Stadium; Mount Pleasant, MI		W 47–10	21,837	
October 7	2:00 pm	at Washington State*	Martin Stadium; Pullman, WA		L 35–42	25,129	
October 14	3:00 pm	Eastern Washington*^{†}	Bronco Stadium; Boise, ID		W 41–23	25,493	
October 21	3:00 pm	North Texas	Bronco Stadium; Boise, ID		W 59–0	22,418	
October 28	6:00 pm	at New Mexico State	Aggie Memorial Stadium; Las Cruces, NM		W 34–31	11,323	
November 4	4:00 pm	at Arkansas State	Indian Stadium; Jonesboro, AR		W 42–14	8,254	
November 11	1:00 pm	Utah State	Bronco Stadium; Boise, ID		W 66–38	27,206	
November 18	1:00 pm	Idaho	Bronco Stadium; Boise, ID (rivalry)		W 66–24	30,856	
December 28	11:30 am	UTEP*	Bronco Stadium; Boise, ID (Humanitarian Bowl)	ESPN2	W 38–23	26,203	
*Non-conference game; ^{†}Homecoming; Rankings from The Sports Network Poll released prior to the game; All times are in Mountain time
