= Miami Vice Squad =

Indoor football team

Miami Vice Squad
Founded	2006
Arena	BankUnited Center
Based in	Coral Gables, Florida
Colors	Burgundy, white
League	National Indoor Football League
Head coach	Nakia Jenkins
President of Football Operations

The Miami Vice Squad was an indoor football team. They were a 2007 expansion member of the National Indoor Football League. They intended to play their home games at the BankUnited Center in Coral Gables, Florida but with 3 or their 4 games that season postponed, when the Florida Division suspended in early 2007, they had played only one game. They beat the Port St. Lucie Mustangs 57-17.

== Season-By-Season ==
Season records
Season	W	L	T	Finish	Playoff results
2007	1	0	0	2nd Atlantic Florida	--
