= Randy Hanson =

American football player and coach (born 1968)

Personal information
- Born: January 17, 1968 (age 58)

Career information
- College: Pacific University

Career history
- Eastern Washington (1993–1995) Assistant defensive backs coach; Washington (1996–1997) Graduate assistant; Eastern Washington (1998–1999) Secondary coach; Portland State (2000) Secondary coach; Portland State (2001–2002) Secondary & special teams coach; Minnesota Vikings (2003–2004) Offensive quality control coach; Minnesota Vikings (2005) Assistant quarterbacks coach; St. Louis Rams (2006) Offensive quality control coach; Oakland Raiders (2007–2008) Assistant secondary coach; Oakland Raiders (2009) Assistant coach-defense; Sacramento Mountain Lions (2011) Assistant defensive backs coach

Randy Allan Hanson (born January 17, 1968) is an American football coach who served as an assistant with the Minnesota Vikings, St. Louis Rams, and Oakland Raiders of the National Football League (NFL). Hanson was put on a paid leave of absence in August 2009 following an alleged incident with Head Coach Tom Cable in which Hanson suffered a broken jaw.

== Playing career ==
Hanson played quarterback at San Joaquin Delta College in 1987, Walla Walla Community College from 1988 to 1989, and Pacific University (Forest Grove, Ore.) from 1990 to 1991.

== Coaching career ==
=== College ===
Hanson began his coaching career as the assistant defensive backs coach at Eastern Washington University (1993–1995). He then became a graduate assistant coach on defense at the University of Washington (1996–1997) before returning to EWU as a secondary coach (1998–1999). From 2000 to 2002, he was the secondary coach at Portland State and added the role of special teams coordinator. (2001–2002)

=== NFL ===
In 2003, Hanson was hired by Mike Tice as an offensive quality control coach for the Minnesota Vikings. In 2005, Hanson was promoted by the Minnesota Vikings to assistant quarterback coach. In 2006, Hanson was hired by Scott Linehan as an offensive quality control coach for the St. Louis Rams. In 2007, Hanson joined the Oakland Raiders, where he served under defensive coordinator Rob Ryan as an assistant secondary coach. In January 2009, the Oakland Raiders demoted Hanson to assistant coach-defense. On August 5, 2009, Hanson and Raiders head coach Tom Cable were involved in an altercation that resulted in the breaking of Hanson's jaw. Hanson was placed on paid administrative leave. On October 22, 2009, the Napa District Attorney announced that no charges would be filed against Cable, as Hanson's story was not consistent with the other three assistant coaches who were in the room with Hanson and Cable. Hanson was reassigned to the team's scouting department in December 2009.

=== Later career ===
In 2011, he was an assistant under Dennis Green with the Sacramento Mountain Lions of the United Football League. In 2012, he returned to college football as the defensive backs coach of the Cal Poly Mustangs. On August 5, 2012, he was arrested on suspicion of assault with a deadly weapon for striking a person with a beer bottle. The following day, the school suspended him indefinitely. He was convicted of felony battery and misdemeanor assault.
