= 2000 Idaho Vandals football team =

American college football season

2000 Idaho Vandals football
- Conference: Big West Conference
- Record: 5–6 (3–2 Big West)
- Head coach: Tom Cable (1st season)
- Offensive coordinator: Bret Ingalls (1st season)
- Offensive scheme: Pro-style
- Defensive coordinator: Ed Rifilato (1st season)
- Base defense: 4–3
- Home stadium: Martin Stadium; Kibbie Dome

2000 Big West Conference football standings
	Conf.			Overall
Team	W		L	W		L
Boise State $	5	–	0	10	–	2
Utah State	4	–	1	5	–	6
Idaho	3	–	2	5	–	6
New Mexico State	1	–	4	3	–	8
North Texas	1	–	4	3	–	8
Arkansas State	1	–	4	1	–	10
$ – Conference champion

The 2000 Idaho Vandals football team represented the University of Idaho in the Big West Conference during the 2000 NCAA Division I-A football season. Led by first-year head coach Tom Cable, the Vandals were 5–6 overall (3–2 in Big West, third).

Idaho played only one of their four home games at the Kibbie Dome, an indoor facility on campus in Moscow, Idaho; the other three were at Martin Stadium at Washington State University in nearby Pullman, Washington.

In the Battle of the Palouse, Idaho defeated neighboring Washington State for the second straight year; the previous two victories in this series were 35 years earlier and also in consecutive years under different head coaches: 1964 (Dee Andros) and 1965 (Steve Musseau).

== Schedule ==
Date	Time	Opponent	Site	Result	Attendance	Source
September 2	12:30 pm	at No. 14 Washington*	Husky Stadium; Seattle, WA	L 20–44	70,117	
September 9	1:00 pm	No. 10 Montana*	Martin Stadium; Pullman, WA (Little Brown Stein)	L 38–45	17,929	
September 16	3:30 pm	at Oregon*	Autzen Stadium; Eugene, OR	L 13–42	43,770	
September 23	2:00 pm	at Washington State*	Martin Stadium; Pullman, WA (Battle of the Palouse)	W 38–34	31,409	
September 30	6:00 pm	Montana State*	Martin Stadium; Pullman, WA	W 56–7	13,315	
October 7	10:00 am	at West Virginia*	Mountaineer Field; Morgantown, WV	L 16–28	41,185	
October 14	6:00 pm	Arkansas State^{†}	Martin Stadium; Pullman, WA	W 42–25	19,779	
October 21	2:00 pm	at Utah State	Romney Stadium; Logan, UT	L 14–31	14,217	
November 4	12:30 pm	at North Texas	Fouts Field; Denton, TX	W 16–14	10,165	
November 11	6:00 pm	New Mexico State	Kibbie Dome; Moscow, ID	W 44–41 ^{2OT}	16,389	
November 18	12:00 pm	at Boise State	Bronco Stadium; Boise, ID (rivalry)	L 24–66	30,856	
*Non-conference game; ^{†}Homecoming; Rankings from AP Poll released prior to the game; All times are in Pacific time

== NFL draft ==
Two Vandal seniors were selected in the 2001 NFL draft, which lasted seven rounds (246 selections).

Player	Position	Round	Overall	Franchise
Rick DeMulling	Guard	7th	220	Indianapolis Colts
Mike Roberg	Tight end	7th	227	Carolina Panthers
