= 2000 Aloha Bowl =

American college football game

Boston College Eagles	Arizona State Sun Devils
(6–5)	(6–5)
31	17
Head coach: Tom O'Brien	Head coach: Bruce Snyder
	1	2	3	4	Total
Boston College	10	0	14	7	31
Arizona State	7	3	0	7	17
- Date: December 25, 2000
- Season: 2000
- Stadium: Aloha Stadium
- Location: Honolulu, Hawaii
- Attendance: 24,397

United States TV coverage
- Network: ABC
- Announcers: Brent Musburger; Gary Danielson; Jack Arute

The 2000 Aloha Bowl was a college football bowl game played Christmas Day 2000 in Honolulu, Hawaii. It was part of the 2000 NCAA Division I-A football season. It featured the Boston College Eagles of the Big East Conference, and the Arizona State Sun Devils of the Pacific-10 Conference. Boston College won the game, 31–17. This was the final Aloha Bowl.

== Scoring summary ==
- Arizona State - Tom Pace 14 yard touchdown run (Barth kick), 11:50 remaining in 1st.
- Boston College - Cedric Washington 10 yard touchdown run (Sutphin kick), 10:43 remaining in 1st.
- Boston College - 50 yard field goal by Mike Sutphin, 8:20 remaining in 1st.
- Arizona State - 28 yard field goal by Mike Barth, 11:17 remaining in 2nd.
- Boston College - Dedrick Dewalt 58 yard touchdown pass from Tim Hasselbeck (Sutphin kick), 8:48 remaining in 3rd.
- Boston College - Ryan Read 40 yard touchdown pass from Tim Hasselbeck (Sutphin kick), 5:52 remaining in 3rd.
- Boston College - Cedric Washington 11 yard touchdown run (Sutphin kick), 11:30 remaining in 4th.
- Arizona State - Ryan Dennard 31 yard touchdown pass from Matt Cooper (Barth kick), :51 remaining in 4th.

== Statistics ==
Statistics	Boston College	Arizona State
First downs	14	20
Rushing yards	180	140
Passing yards	209	220
Sacked-Yards lost	5-41	1-11
Return yards	38	47
Passes Intercepted	1	2
Punts-Average	6-43.7	6-43.8
Fumbles-Lost	2-1	4-3
Penalties-Yards	6-62	3-30
Time of possession	24:27	35:33
