= Bart Hendricks =

American gridiron football player (born 1978)

No. 17
- Position: Quarterback

Personal information
- Born: August 30, 1978 (age 48)

Career information
- High school: Reno (NV) Hug
- College: Boise State
- NFL draft: 2001: undrafted

Career history
- Frankfurt Galaxy (2002); Edmonton Eskimos (2002–2004); Boise Burn (2007)

Awards and highlights
- Grey Cup champion (2003); Humanitarian Bowl MVP (2000); 2× Big West Offensive Player of the Year (1999, 2000); 2× First-team All-Big West (1999, 2000); Boise State Hall of Fame

Bart Hendricks (born August 30, 1978) is a former gridiron football quarterback. He played for the Edmonton Eskimos of the Canadian Football League (CFL). He played college football at Boise State.

== Early life ==
Hendricks attended Hug High School in Reno, Nevada.

== College career ==
During his career at Boise State, Hendricks completed 650 of 1,142 passes for 9,030 yards and 78 touchdowns. As a senior in 2000, he led the nation in passing touchdowns with 35. In his final college game, he was named the MVP of the 2000 Humanitarian Bowl.

== See also ==
- List of NCAA major college football yearly passing leaders
