= 2002 Utah State Aggies football team =

American college football season

2002 Utah State Aggies football
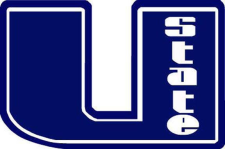
- Conference: Independent
- Record: 4–7
- Head coach: Mick Dennehy (3rd season)
- Offensive coordinator: Bob Cole (3rd season)
- Defensive coordinator: Kraig Paulson (3rd season)
- Home stadium: Romney Stadium

2002 NCAA Division I-A independents football records
	Conf.			Overall
Team	W		L	W		L
South Florida		–		9	–	2
No. 17 Notre Dame		–		10	–	3
Connecticut		–		6	–	6
Utah State		–		4	–	7
Troy State		–		4	–	8
Navy		–		2	–	10
Rankings from AP Poll

The 2002 Utah State Aggies football team represented Utah State University in the 2002 NCAA Division I-A football season. Utah State competed as an independent and played home games at Romney Stadium in Logan, Utah.

== Schedule ==
Date	Opponent	Site	TV	Result	Attendance	Source
August 31	Utah	Romney Stadium; Logan, UT (Battle of the Brothers)		L 3–23	30,757	
September 7	at No. 9 Nebraska	Memorial Stadium; Lincoln, NE		L 13–44	78,176	
September 14	Idaho State	Romney Stadium; Logan, UT		W 38–33	16,231	
September 21	at Iowa	Kinnick Stadium; Iowa City, IA	ESPN Plus	L 7–48	54,211	
September 28	at Boise State	Bronco Stadium; Boise, ID		L 38–63	25,161	
October 4	BYU	Romney Stadium; Logan, UT (rivalry)		L 34–35	30,341	
October 19	New Mexico	Romney Stadium; Logan, UT		W 45–44 ^{OT}	15,942	
November 6	at Louisiana–Monroe	Malone Stadium; Monroe, LA		L 48–51 ^{2OT}	6,190	
November 9	New Mexico State	Romney Stadium; Logan, UT		W 32–30	12,291	
November 16	at Troy State	Movie Gallery Stadium; Troy, AL		W 19–16 ^{OT}	12,348	
November 30	at Middle Tennessee	Johnny "Red" Floyd Stadium; Murfreesboro, TN		L 28–45	3,418	
Rankings from Coaches' Poll released prior to the game
