= 2000 North Texas Mean Green football team =

American college football season

2000 North Texas Mean Green football
- Conference: Big West Conference
- Record: 3–8 (1–4 Big West)
- Head coach: Darrell Dickey (3rd season)
- Offensive scheme: Pro spread
- Defensive coordinator: Gary DeLoach (1st season)
- Base defense: 4–3
- Home stadium: Fouts Field

2000 Big West Conference football standings
	Conf.			Overall
Team	W		L	W		L
Boise State $	5	–	0	10	–	2
Utah State	4	–	1	5	–	6
Idaho	3	–	2	5	–	6
New Mexico State	1	–	4	3	–	8
North Texas	1	–	4	3	–	8
Arkansas State	1	–	4	1	–	10
$ – Conference champion

The 2000 North Texas Mean Green football team represented the University of North Texas as a member of the Big West Conference during the 2000 NCAA Division I-A football season. Led by third-year head coach Darrell Dickey, the Mean Green compiled an overall record of 3–8 with a mark 1–4 in conference play, placing in a three-way tie for fourth at the bottom of the Big West standings. The team played home games at the Fouts Field in Denton, Texas,

== Schedule ==
Date	Opponent	Site	Result	Attendance	Source
August 31	Baylor*	Fouts Field; Denton, TX	L 7–20	28,315	
September 9	at Texas Tech*	Jones SBC Stadium; Lubbock, TX	L 7–13	36,925	
September 16	at UNLV*	Sam Boyd Stadium; Whitney, NV	L 0–38	16,544	
September 23	at No. 4 Kansas State*	KSU Stadium; Manhattan, KS	L 10–55	47,926	
October 5	Samford*	Fouts Field; Denton, TX	W 41–6	8,712	
October 14	Utah State^{†}	Fouts Field; Denton, TX	L 12–17	15,073	
October 21	at Boise State	Bronco Stadium; Boise, ID	L 0–59	22,418	
October 28	at Louisiana–Lafayette*	Cajun Field; Lafayette, LA	W 13–0	12,650	
November 4	Idaho	Fouts Field; Denton, TX	L 14–16	10,165	
November 11	at Arkansas State	Indians Stadium; Jonesboro, AR	L 28–53	8,391	
November 18	New Mexico State	Fouts Field; Denton, TX	W 30–23	8,635	
*Non-conference game; ^{†}Homecoming; Rankings from AP Poll released prior to the game
