= Jose Fuentes (quarterback) =

Former American football quarterback

Profile
- Position: Quarterback

Personal information
- Listed height: 6 ft 3 in (1.91 m)
- Listed weight: 221 lb (100 kg)

Career information
- High school: Rancho Cucamonga
- College: Utah State (1999–2002)

Career history
- Green Bay Packers (2003)*
- * Offseason or practice squad member only

Jose Fuentes (born c 1981) is a former American football quarterback. He played for the Utah State Aggies from 1999 to 2002. In both 2001 and 2002, he ranked among the leading quarterbacks in major-college football with 281.8 yards gained per game played in 2001 (7th), 297.1 yards gained per game played in 2002 (7th), 3,100 passing yards in 2001 (10th), 3,268 passing yards in 2002, and 18 interceptions in 2001 (3rd). In four years at Utah State, he completed 704 of 1,270 passes (55.4%) for 9,168 yards, 60 touchdowns, 43 interceptions, and a 124.9 passer rating. During his career, he broke the school's single-game and season passing records; his 9,168 career passing yards remains the school record as of 2026.

Fuentes signed with the Green Bay Packers, but he was waived in May 2003. He later worked as a high school football coach in Southern California. In 2021, Fuentes was selected by The Utah Statesman at No. 5 on its list of the top six Utah State football legends.

== See also ==
- Utah State Aggies football statistical leaders
