= 2001 Utah State Aggies football team =

American college football season

2001 Utah State Aggies football
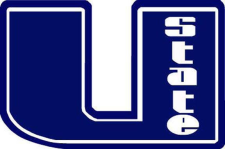
- Conference: Independent
- Record: 4–7
- Head coach: Mick Dennehy (2nd season)
- Offensive coordinator: Bob Cole (2nd season)
- Defensive coordinator: Kraig Paulson (2nd season)
- Home stadium: Romney Stadium

2001 NCAA Division I-A independents football records
	Conf.			Overall
Team	W		L	W		L
South Florida		–		8	–	3
Troy State		–		7	–	4
UCF		–		6	–	5
Notre Dame		–		5	–	6
Utah State		–		4	–	7
Connecticut		–		2	–	9
Navy		–		0	–	10
Rankings from AP Poll

The 2001 Utah State Aggies football team represented Utah State University as an independent during the 2001 NCAA Division I-A football season. The Aggies were led by second-year head coach Mick Dennehy and played their home games in Romney Stadium in Logan, Utah.

== Schedule ==
Date	Opponent	Site	Result	Attendance	Source
September 1	at Utah	Rice–Eccles Stadium; Salt Lake City, UT (Battle of the Brothers)	L 19–23	36,557	
September 8	at No. 13 LSU	Tiger Stadium; Baton Rouge, LA	L 14–31	87,756	
September 22	Wyoming	Romney Stadium; Logan, UT (rivalry)	L 42–43	27,235	
September 29	No. 7 Oregon	Romney Stadium; Logan, UT	L 21–38	28,243	
October 5	at No. 20 BYU	LaVell Edwards Stadium; Provo, UT (rivalry)	L 34–54	65,396	
October 20	Idaho State	Romney Stadium; Logan, UT	W 28–27	20,875	
October 27	UCF	Romney Stadium; Logan, UT	W 30–27	16,135	
November 10	at Connecticut	Memorial Stadium; Storrs, CT	W 38–31	13,207	
November 17	Weber State	Romney Stadium; Logan, UT	W 56–43	16,434	
November 24	at South Florida	Raymond James Stadium; Tampa, FL	L 13–34	25,136	
December 1	at No. 21 Fresno State	Bulldog Stadium; Fresno, CA	L 21–70	42,881	
Rankings from AP Poll released prior to the game
