= 2000 New Mexico State Aggies football team =

American college football season

2000 New Mexico State Aggies football
- Conference: Big West Conference
- Record: 3–8 (1–4 Big West)
- Head coach: Tony Samuel (4th season)
- Offensive coordinator: Barney Cotton (4th season)
- Offensive scheme: Option
- Defensive coordinator: Steve Stanard (1st season)
- Base defense: 4–3
- Home stadium: Aggie Memorial Stadium

2000 Big West Conference football standings
	Conf.			Overall
Team	W		L	W		L
Boise State $	5	–	0	10	–	2
Utah State	4	–	1	5	–	6
Idaho	3	–	2	5	–	6
New Mexico State	1	–	4	3	–	8
North Texas	1	–	4	3	–	8
Arkansas State	1	–	4	1	–	10
$ – Conference champion

The 2000 New Mexico State Aggies football team was an American football team that represented New Mexico State University in the Big West Conference during the 2000 NCAA Division I-A football season. In their fourth year under head coach Tony Samuel, the Aggies compiled a 3–8 record. The team played its home games at Aggie Memorial Stadium in Las Cruces, New Mexico.

== Schedule ==
Date	Time	Opponent	Site	Result	Attendance	Source
September 2	4:00 p.m.	at South Carolina*	Williams–Brice Stadium; Columbia, SC	L 0–31	80,814	
September 16		New Mexico*	Aggie Memorial Stadium; Las Cruces, NM (rivalry)	L 13–16	23,087	
September 23	11:00 a.m.	at No. 24 Georgia*	Sanford Stadium; Athens, GA	L 0–37	85,202	
September 30	7:05 p.m.	at UTEP*	Sun Bowl; El Paso, TX (rivalry)	L 31–41	50,068	
October 7	6:00 p.m.	Army*	Aggie Memorial Stadium; Las Cruces, NM	W 42–23	18,685	
October 14	6:00 p.m.	Tulsa*	Aggie Memorial Stadium; Las Cruces, NM	W 42–28	15,822	
October 21		at Arkansas State	Indian Stadium; Jonesboro, AR	W 35–29	8,778	
October 28	6:00 p.m.	Boise State	Aggie Memorial Stadium; Las Cruces, NM	L 31–34	11,323	
November 4		Utah State	Aggie Memorial Stadium; Las Cruces, NM	L 37–44	10,213	
November 11	7:00 p.m.	at Idaho	Kibbie Dome; Moscow, ID	L 41–44 ^{2OT}	16,389	
November 18		at North Texas	Fouts Field; Denton, TX	L 23–30	8,635	
*Non-conference game; Rankings from AP Poll released prior to the game; All times are in Mountain time
