= 2000 Arkansas State Indians football team =

American college football season

2000 Arkansas State Indians football
- Conference: Big West Conference
- Record: 1–10 (1–4 Big West)
- Head coach: Joe Hollis (4th season)
- Offensive coordinator: Randy Fichtner (3rd season)
- Defensive coordinator: Leon Burtnett (2nd season)
- Home stadium: Indian Stadium

2000 Big West Conference football standings
	Conf.			Overall
Team	W		L	W		L
Boise State $	5	–	0	10	–	2
Utah State	4	–	1	5	–	6
Idaho	3	–	2	5	–	6
New Mexico State	1	–	4	3	–	8
North Texas	1	–	4	3	–	8
Arkansas State	1	–	4	1	–	10
$ – Conference champion

The 2000 Arkansas State Indians football team represented Arkansas State University as a member of the Big West Conference the 2000 NCAA Division I-A football season. Led by fourth-year head coach Joe Hollis, the Indians compiled an overall record of 1–10 with a mark of 1–4 in conference play, placing in a three-way tie for fourth in the Big West.

== Schedule ==
Date	Opponent	Site	Result	Attendance	Source
September 2	at NC State*	Carter–Finley Stadium; Raleigh, NC	L 31–38 ^{2OT}	46,973	
September 9	at No. 20 Oklahoma*	Oklahoma Memorial Stadium; Norman, OK	L 7–45	74,730	
September 16	Memphis*	Indian Stadium; Jonesboro, AR (Paint Bucket Bowl)	L 17–19	19,022	
September 23	at No. 18 TCU*	Amon G. Carter Stadium; Fort Worth, TX	L 3–52	32,167	
September 30	No. 19 (I-AA) Richmond*^{†}	Indian Stadium; Jonesboro, AR	L 27–30	13,116	
October 7	at Ole Miss*	Vaught–Hemingway Stadium; Oxford, MS	L 10–35	44,042	
October 14	at Idaho	Kibbie Dome; Moscow, ID	L 25–42	19,779	
October 21	New Mexico State	Indian Stadium; Jonesboro, AR	L 29–35	14,217	
October 28	at Utah State	Romney Stadium; Logan, UT	L 31–44	14,926	
November 4	Boise State	Indian Stadium; Jonesboro, AR	L 14–42	8,254	
November 11	North Texas	Indian Stadium; Jonesboro, AR	W 53–28	8,391	
*Non-conference game; ^{†}Homecoming; Rankings from AP Poll released prior to the game
