= Tom Cable =

American football player and coach (born 1964)

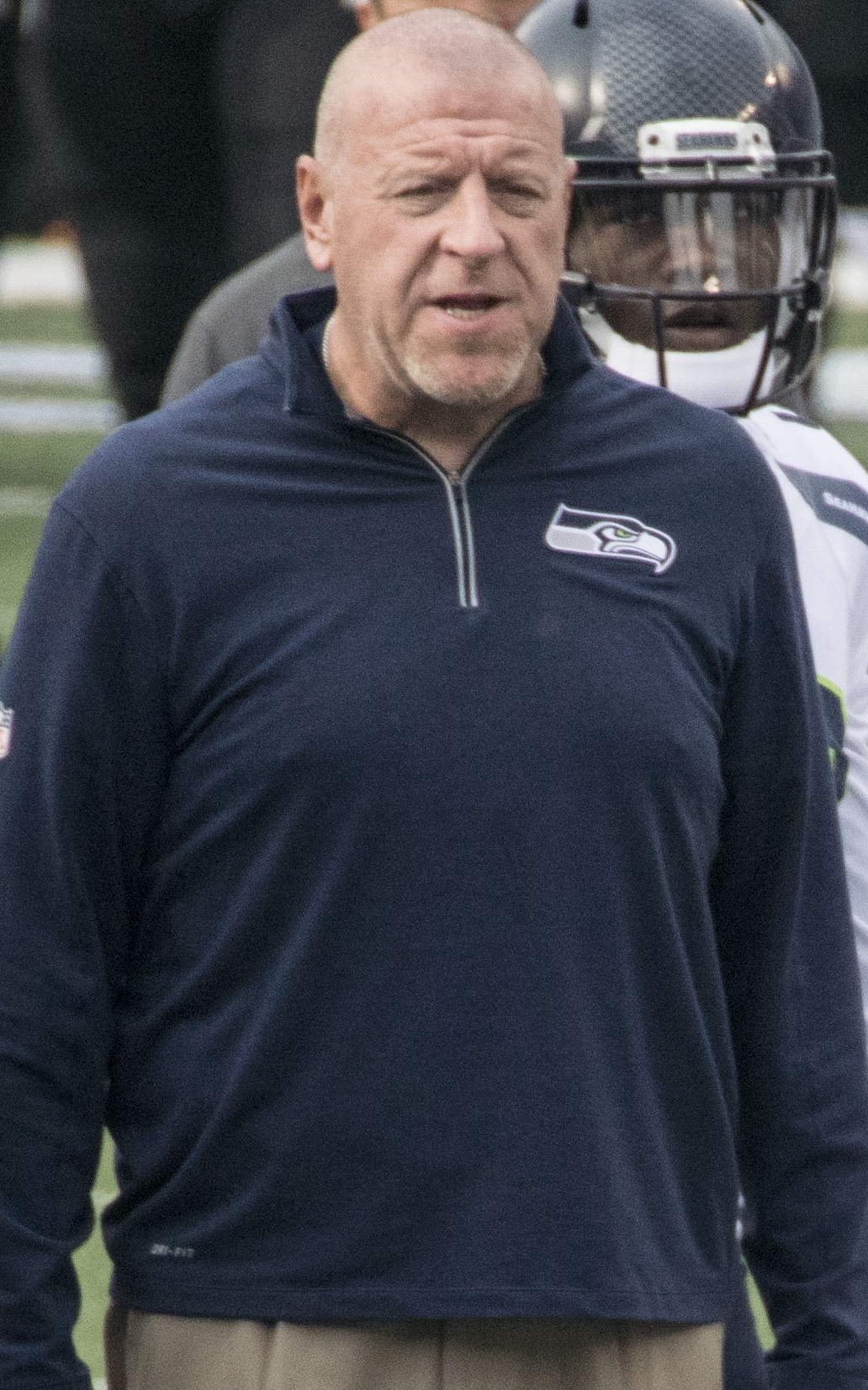
- Cable in 2015

Personal information
- Born: November 26, 1964 (age 61); Merced, California, U.S.

Career information
- High school: Snohomish (WA)
- College: Idaho
- NFL draft: 1987: undrafted

Career history

Playing
- Indianapolis Colts (1987)

Coaching
- Idaho (1987–1988) Graduate assistant; San Diego State (1989) Graduate assistant; Cal State Fullerton (1990) Defensive line coach; UNLV (1991) Offensive line coach; California (1992–1997) Offensive line coach; Colorado (1998) Offensive line coach; Colorado (1999) Offensive coordinator; Idaho (2000–2003) Head coach; UCLA (2004–2005) Offensive coordinator; Atlanta Falcons (2006) Offensive line coach; Oakland Raiders (2007–2008) Offensive line coach; Oakland Raiders (2008–2010) Head coach; Seattle Seahawks (2011–2017) Assistant head coach & offensive line coach; Oakland / Las Vegas Raiders (2018–2021) Offensive line coach; Houston Roughnecks (2025) Run game coordinator

Awards and highlights
- Super Bowl champion (XLVIII)

Head coaching record
- Regular season: NFL: 17–27 (.386); NCAA: 11–35 (.239)
- Coaching profile at Pro Football Reference

Thomas Lee Cable Jr. (born November 26, 1964) is an American football coach who recently served as the run game coordinator for the Houston Roughnecks of the United Football League (UFL). He served with four National Football League (NFL) franchises between the 2006 and 2021 seasons.

Cable played college football for the Idaho Vandals and was on the replacement team for the Indianapolis Colts during the 1987 NFL players' strike. After being an assistant coach for several college football teams, as well as head coach at Idaho, Cable became an offensive line coach for the Atlanta Falcons and Oakland Raiders of the NFL, before serving as head coach for the Raiders from 2008 to 2010. He was the assistant head coach and offensive line coach of the Seattle Seahawks, where the franchise made to it two Super Bowls, winning Super Bowl XLVIII. Cable returned to the Raiders a second time, serving as the offensive line coach from 2018 to 2021.

== Early life ==
Born in Merced, California, Cable played high school football in Snohomish, Washington, northeast of Seattle. He graduated from Snohomish High School in 1982 and accepted an athletic scholarship to the University of Idaho from first-time head coach Dennis Erickson.

Cable played on the offensive line for the Vandals under head coaches Erickson and Keith Gilbertson, blocking for quarterback Scott Linehan. Idaho won the Big Sky title in 1985 and advanced to the Division I-AA playoffs in 1985 and 1986. He was a member of the Indianapolis Colts' strike replacement team in 1987, but did not play in the two games he was on the team's active roster.

== Coaching career ==
=== College ===
Cable then embarked on a career as a college football coach. He was a graduate assistant for three years and an assistant coach for a decade, ascending to offensive coordinator at Colorado in 1999. That December, he became the head coach at his alma mater, with a three-year contract at $170,000 per year ($120,000 base and $50,000 media bonus) plus $30,000 in incentives. He succeeded fellow alumnus Chris Tormey, who had departed earlier in the month after five seasons for Nevada. At Idaho, Cable's first year in 2000 was his best, with a 5–6 record. He managed only six victories in the next three seasons, resulting in a disappointing record of 11–35 (.239) in four losing seasons. Following the three-win 2003 season, Cable became the first Idaho head football coach fired in 22 years; his four predecessors had all achieved success in Moscow and moved on. Cable then became the offensive coordinator at UCLA for two seasons (2004–2005) under head coach Karl Dorrell, a former colleague at Colorado.

=== Atlanta Falcons ===
Cable entered the professional ranks in 2006 as the offensive line coach for the NFL's Atlanta Falcons, under head coach Jim L. Mora, who was dismissed at the end of the season.

=== Oakland Raiders ===
Cable joined the Oakland Raiders as offensive line coach for the 2007 season, under first-year head coach Lane Kiffin. Four games into the 2008 season with the team's record at 1–3, Kiffin was fired by owner Al Davis and Cable was named the interim head coach. The Raiders finished the 2008 season with a 4–8 record under Cable, but improved statistically in many categories.

On February 4, 2009, Cable was officially introduced as the Raiders new head coach. Davis had made his decision nearly a week before, but did not want to interfere with the Super Bowl. Davis also gave Cable time off prior to that due to the death of Cable's father. On January 4, 2011, Raiders' owner Al Davis informed Cable that his contract would not be renewed, ending his tenure with the organization. During his time as head coach, Cable had a 17–27 (.386) record, including a record of 8–8 in his final season. Offensive coordinator Hue Jackson succeeded him as head coach.

The Raiders rushing attack ranked in the top 10 in the NFL in 2007 (sixth) and 2008 (10th) behind Cable's offensive lines.

=== Seattle Seahawks ===
Two weeks later on January 18, 2011, Cable was hired by the Seattle Seahawks as offensive line coach and assistant head coach, under head coach Pete Carroll.

In collaboration with offensive coordinator Darrell Bevell, the two spearheaded Seattle's rushing attack to become one of the best over the last-half of the 2011 season. Behind his lines, the Seahawks running game ranked fifth in the NFL with 1,212 rushing yards (Weeks 9–17), and posted 100-plus team rushing yards in eight of its last nine games, including a six-game streak that was its longest since the 2002–03 seasons.

Seattle's line once ranked as the third-youngest in the NFL, but with injuries to rookie James Carpenter, John Moffitt, and Russell Okung, the Seahawks' offensive line finished as the seventh-youngest in the league. Despite that, Cable plugged away and maintained a solid unit as Seattle’s line paved the way for Marshawn Lynch's career-year with 285 carries, 1,204 yards, and 12 rushing touchdowns. Lynch also led the league the last half of the season with 941 yards and nine touchdowns, rushing for 100-plus in six of the last nine games, and became Seattle’s first 1,000-yard rusher since Shaun Alexander in 2005. Cable won his first Super Bowl ring as an assistant coach to the Seahawks.

Cable has become synonymous in recent years for transitioning players with little or no experience at offensive line and quickly making them into NFL starting-caliber offensive lineman. His first player was J. R. Sweezy, a collegiate defensive end that Cable drafted in 2012 and switched to an offensive guard in seven months. The second was Garry Gilliam, whom Cable signed as an undrafted free agent in 2014. Gilliam had one year of experience as a collegiate offensive tackle and was a tight end since age 7. He started his first game in five months. The most recent and dramatic is George Fant, who was a basketball power forward in college and played tight end for a single year. The Seahawks signed him as an undrafted free agent after Cable insisted and he won the Seahawks' starting left tackle position in less than 20 months.

On January 10, 2018, Cable was fired after the Seahawks went 9–7 in 2017 and failed to qualify for the playoffs.

=== Oakland / Las Vegas Raiders ===
Three days later on January 13, 2018, Cable returned to Oakland as the offensive line coach in returning Raider head coach Jon Gruden's new staff.

In 2019, the Raiders finished eighth in sacks allowed with 29 and then 10th in sacks allowed in 2020 with 28. After allowing 40 sacks in 2021, Cable was fired by the team.

== Allegations of violence ==
On August 17, 2009, ESPN reported that Cable was accused of punching assistant coach Randy Hanson in the face and fracturing his jaw. The incident allegedly took place on August 5 during the Raiders' training camp, held in Napa. On October 22, 2009, the Napa district attorney announced that no charges would be filed against Cable. Hanson later filed a civil suit against Cable and the Raiders, citing assault, battery and intentional infliction of emotional distress. The matter was settled in arbitration.

On November 1, 2009, the ESPN show Outside the Lines reported that Cable was accused of physical abuse against two ex-wives and an ex-girlfriend. One of the accusers filed a civil suit against Cable, which was later settled. Cable's wife, Glenda, released a statement: "I have known Tom Cable for more than 20 years, including 17 years of marriage. Throughout the time I have known him, Tom has never been violent to me or our children. I chose not to speak to the media before now to protect my privacy and that of my children. However, I am very troubled by what is being claimed by others and I felt compelled to speak out about my own lengthy experience with Tom."

Oakland Raiders owner Al Davis specifically called attention to the allegations of violence against women and the altercation with Hanson as contributing to his decision to fire Cable. In addition, Davis fined Cable $120,000.

== Personal life ==
As of 2017, Cable is married with five children. He dropped over 138 pounds of weight while a Seahawks coach due to what he termed clean eating.

== Head coaching record ==
=== College ===
| Year | Team | Overall | Conference | Standing | Bowl/playoffs |
|---|---|---|---|---|---|
Idaho Vandals (Big West Conference) (2000)
| 2000 | Idaho | 5–6 | 3–2 | 3rd | |
Idaho Vandals (Sun Belt Conference) (2001–2003)
| 2001 | Idaho | 1–10 | 1–5 | 7th | |
| 2002 | Idaho | 2–10 | 1–5 | 7th | |
| 2003 | Idaho | 3–9 | 3–4 | 6th | |
| Idaho: | | 11–35 | 8–16 | | |
| Total: | | 11–35 | | | |

=== NFL ===
| Team | Year | Regular season | | | | | Postseason | | | |
| Team | Year | Won | Lost | Ties | Win % | Finish | Won | Lost | Win % | Result |
|---|---|---|---|---|---|---|---|---|---|---|
| OAK* | 2008 | 4 | 8 | 0 | .333 | 3rd in AFC West | – | – | – | – |
| OAK | 2009 | 5 | 11 | 0 | .312 | 3rd in AFC West | – | – | – | – |
| OAK | 2010 | 8 | 8 | 0 | .500 | 3rd in AFC West | – | – | – | – |
| Total | | 17 | 27 | 0 | .386 | | – | – | – | |

* Interim head coach.
