= Kendal Smith =

American football player (born 1965)

No. 83
- Position: Wide receiver

Personal information
- Born: November 23, 1965 (age 60); San Mateo, California, U.S.
- Listed height: 5 ft 10 in (1.78 m)
- Listed weight: 189 lb (86 kg)

Career information
- High school: Mountain View (Mountain View, California)
- College: Utah State (1985–1988)
- NFL draft: 1989: 7th round, 194th overall pick

Career history
- Cincinnati Bengals (1989–1990); Minnesota Vikings (1992)*
- * Offseason or practice squad member only

Awards and highlights
- Third-team All-American (1988); PCAA Offensive Player of the Year (1988); First-team All-PCAA (1988); Second-team All-PCAA (1987)

Career NFL statistics
- Receptions: 17
- Receiving yards: 185
- Touchdowns: 1
- Stats at Pro Football Reference

Kendal Carson Smith (born November 23, 1965) is an American former professional football player who was a wide receiver for two seasons with the Cincinnati Bengals of the National Football League (NFL). He was selected by the Bengals in the seventh round of the 1989 NFL draft after playing college football for the Utah State Aggies.

== Early life ==
Kendal Carson Smith was born on November 23, 1965, in San Mateo, California. He attended Mountain View High School in Mountain View, California.

== College career ==
Smith was a four-year letterman for the Utah State Aggies of Utah State University from 1985 to 1988. He caught 12 passes for 225 yards as a freshman in 1985 while also scoring one rushing touchdown and returning 11 punts for 99 yards. In 1986, he recorded 25 receptions for 474 yards and seven touchdowns, 37 kick returns for 735 yards, and 31 punt returns for 183 yards. He led the Pacific Coast Athletic Association (PCAA) in kick returns and kick return yards that year. In 1987, Smith totaled 67 catches for 1,048 yards and seven touchdowns, 18 kick returns for 317 yards, and 26 punt returns for 293 yards and one touchdown. His 67 catches set a single-season school record. He garnered second-team All-PCAA recognition as well. As a senior in 1988, he recorded 65 receptions for 1,196 yards and 11 touchdowns, leading the PCAA in all three categories and setting single-season school records in receiving yards and receiving touchdowns. He also set an NCAA record by scoring a receiving touchdown in nine straight games. He returned 26 kicks for 524 yards and 13 punts for 141 yards and one touchdown as well. For the 1989 season, Smith earned PCAA Offensive Player of the Year, first-team All-PCAA, and Associated Press third-team All-American honors. Overall, he caught 169 passes for 2,943 yards and 25 touchdowns during his college career, setting school career records in all three categories. He also had a Utah State record 81 career punt returns. He played in the Blue–Gray Football Classic and East-West Shrine Game after his senior year. Smith was named to Utah State's 24-member All-Century team in 1993. He was inducted into the school's athletics hall of fame in 2018.

== Professional career ==
Smith was selected by the Cincinnati Bengals in the seventh round, with the 194th overall pick, of the 1989 NFL draft. He officially signed with the team on July 22, 1989. He played in 11 games during his rookie year in 1989, totaling 10 receptions for 140 yards and one touchdown, 12 punt returns for 54 yards, and five kick returns for 65 yards. Smith was released on September 3, 1990, but re-signed the next day. He appeared in nine games, starting two, for the Bengals in 1990 and caught seven passes for 45 yards before being placed on injured reserve on November 23, 1990. He became a free agent after the season and re-signed with the Bengals. Smith was released on August 13, 1991.

Smith signed with the Minnesota Vikings on March 18, 1992. He was released on August 25, 1992.
