= Jose Dolores Fuentes =

American meteorologist

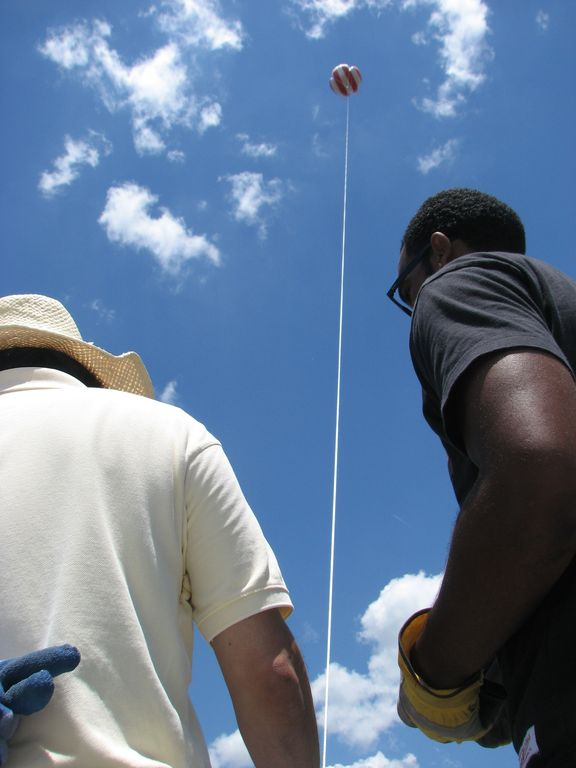
- Jose D. Fuentes and his student using a research balloon at the Beltsville Center for Climate System Observation.
- Education: University of Guelph
- Awards: Fellow, American Meteorological Society
- Scientific career
- Fields: meteorology, atmospheric chemistry
- Workplaces: Pennsylvania State University

Jose Dolores Fuentes is a meteorologist at Pennsylvania State University. His research focuses on surface-atmosphere interactions that control the transport of energy and trace gases in the lower atmosphere. In particular, he has gained media attention for his research into the relationship between air pollution and bees.

== Education ==
Dolores Fuentes earned his PhD at the University of Guelph in 1992. He also attended Millersville University of Pennsylvania, graduating in 1984.

== Career and Honors ==
Before he became a professor of meteorology at Penn State, Dolores Fuentes was a professor of environmental sciences at the University of Virginia. At Penn State, he collaborates with well-known climate scientist Michael E. Mann by co-advising students and working on a research project in the Florida Everglades. He has worked on projects all over the world, including a remote field stations in northern Alaska. He was previously the co-investigator of the Beltsville Center for Climate System Observation, a collaboration between Howard University and NASA which supported summer researchers and atmospheric science.

Dolores Fuentes is also the atmospheric sciences editor for Eos, the magazine of the American Geophysical Union, and a member of the advisory committee for the National Science Foundation's geoscience branch.

== Awards and honors ==
- Ambassador Award, American Geophysical Union, 2023
- Fellow of the American Meteorological Society (AMS)
- AMS Award for Outstanding Achievement in Biometeorology
- AMS Charles E. Anderson Award for "outstanding, sustained efforts to promote diversity in the atmospheric and environmental sciences through education, research, and community service."
