= Nakia Jenkins =

American football player and coach (born 1975)

No. 2
- Position: Wide receiver

Personal information
- Born: June 29, 1975 (age 51); Alta Loma, California, U.S.
- Listed height: 6 ft 0 in (1.83 m)
- Listed weight: 220 lb (100 kg)

Career information
- High school: Belle Glade (FL) Central
- College: Utah State
- NFL draft: 1998: undrafted

Career history

Playing
- New York Jets (1998)*; Jacksonville Jaguars (1999)*; Las Vegas Outlaws (2001); Toronto Phantoms (2002); Grand Rapids Rampage (2004)
- * Offseason or practice squad member only

Coaching
- Miami Vice Squad (2007)

Career AFL statistics
- Receptions: 9
- Receiving yards: 104
- Receiving TDs: 1
- Tackles: 4
- Fumble Recoveries: 1
- Stats at ArenaFan.com

Nakia Antwan Jenkins (born June 29, 1975) is an American former professional football player and coach. He played college football for the Utah State Aggies.

== High school ==
Nakia attended Glades Central High School in Belle Glade, Florida. He was a teammate of Fred Taylor and Reidel Anthony. He played for the school band his freshman and sophomore year.

== College career ==
He was named first-team All-Foothill Conference during the 1994 and 1995 season at Chaffey Junior College. He transferred to Utah State where he played with quarterback Matthew Sauk under head coach John L. Smith.

== Professional career ==
Jenkins went undrafted in the 1998 NFL draft. He was signed as an undrafted free agent by the New York Jets. He was waived during training camp. In 1999 Nakia signed with the Jacksonville Jaguars, he was again released during training camp. In 2000, Jenkins was selected by the Las Vegas Outlaws of the defunct XFL.In 2002, Jenkins was signed by the Toronto Phantoms of the Arena Football League. In 2004, he played for the Grand Rapids Rampage. In 2007, Jenkins was named head coach of Miami Vice Squad of the National Indoor Football League.
