= Mick Dennehy =

American football player and coach (born 1950)

Biographical details
- Born: June 13, 1950 (age 76); Butte, Montana, U.S.

Playing career
- 1971–1972: Montana
- Position: Safety

Coaching career (HC unless noted)
- 1975–1978: Colton HS (WA)
- 1979–1981: Helena HS (MT)
- 1980–1981: Montana State (assistant)
- 1982–1987: Gillette Campbell County HS (WY)
- 1988–1990: Montana Western
- 1991–1995: Montana (OC)
- 1996–1999: Montana
- 2000–2004: Utah State

Administrative career (AD unless noted)
- 2006–2007: Boulder Jefferson HS (MT)

Head coaching record
- Overall: 68–62 (college)
- Tournaments: 3–4 (NCAA D-I-AA playoffs)

Accomplishments and honors

Championships
- 3 Big Sky (1996, 1998–1999)

Michael Dennehy (born June 13, 1950) is an American former football player and coach. He served as the head football coach at the University of Montana Western (1988–1990), the University of Montana (1996–1999), and Utah State University (2000–2004), compiling a career college football record of 68–62.

== Playing career ==
As a safety on the Grizzlies' football team from 1971 to 1972, Dennehy earned first-team all-Big Sky Conference honors in 1972. He is tied for second in single-season Big Sky history with 10 interceptions in 1972, while leading the league that year, as well. Dennehy is tied for ninth in league history with 16 career interceptions.

== Coaching career ==
Dennehy started his college coaching career as an assistant coach for Montana State before switching to coach at high school level for a number of years. He returned to college football coaching at the University of Montana Western, a small NAIA school, before moving on to become the offensive coordinator at the University of Montana. In 1996, he was promoted to head coach of the Montana Grizzlies, but left following the 1999 season to take at post as the head coach of Utah State, replacing Dave Arslanian. In 2005 Dennehy was fired as head coach of Utah State after compiling a record of 19–37.

Dennehy became athletics director at Jefferson High School in Boulder, Montana in 2006. Dennehy resigned after the 2006–07 school year.

== Head coaching record ==
=== College ===
Year	Team	Overall	Conference	Standing	Bowl/playoffs
Montana Western Bulldogs (Frontier Conference) (1988–1990)
1988	Montana Western	1–5	1–5	T–3rd	
1989	Montana Western	4–4	2–4	3rd	
1990	Montana Western	5–3	3–3	T–2nd	
Montana Western:		10–12	6–12		
Montana Grizzlies (Big Sky Conference) (1996–1999)
1996	Montana	14–1	8–0	1st	L NCAA Division I-AA Championship
1997	Montana	8–4	6–2	2nd	L NCAA Division I-AA First Round
1998	Montana	8–4	6–2	1st	L NCAA Division I-AA First Round
1999	Montana	9–3	7–1	1st	L NCAA Division I-AA First Round
Montana:		39–12	27–5		
Utah State Aggies (Big West Conference) (2000)
2000	Utah State	5–6	4–1	2nd	
Utah State Aggies (NCAA Division I-A independent) (2001–2002)
2001	Utah State	4–7			
2002	Utah State	4–7			
Utah State Aggies (Sun Belt Conference) (2003–2004)
2003	Utah State	3–9	3–3	4th	
2004	Utah State	3–8	2–5	9th	
Utah State:		19–37	9–9		
Total:		68–61			
National championship Conference title Conference division title or championship game berth
