= Louie Giammona =

American football player (born 1953)

No. 45, 33
- Position: Running back

Personal information
- Born: March 3, 1953 (age 73); St. Helena, California, U.S.
- Listed height: 5 ft 9 in (1.75 m)
- Listed weight: 180 lb (82 kg)

Career information
- High school: Calistoga (CA)
- College: Utah State
- NFL draft: 1976: 8th round, 214th overall pick

Career history
- New York Jets (1976); Philadelphia Eagles (1978–1982)

Awards and highlights
- Second-team All-American (1974); Third-team All-American (1975)

Career NFL statistics
- Rushing attempts: 201
- Rushing yards: 682
- Total TDs: 9
- Stats at Pro Football Reference

Louis Jean Giammona (born March 3, 1953) is an American former professional football player who was a running back in the National Football League (NFL). He played college football for the Utah State Aggies. Giammona was selected by the New York Jets in the eighth round of the 1976 NFL draft. He played five seasons for the Philadelphia Eagles, including the 1980 team, which advanced to Super Bowl XV.

Giammona was selected to the Utah State Athletics Hall of Fame in 2010. He is the nephew of former NFL coach, Dick Vermeil.
