= Beehive Boot =

Three-way American sports rivalry

- BYU Cougars Utah Utes Utah State Aggies
- First meeting: 1971; 55 years ago

Locations of BYU, Utah, and Utah State

The Beehive Boot, which signifies instate football supremacy among Division I FBS universities from the state of Utah, began in the 1971 NCAA University Division football season. The authentic pioneer boot, which is estimated to be well over 100 years old, is typically awarded annually to the Utah school with the best record against its instate NCAA Division I FBS foes. The team that compete for the boot are BYU Cougars, Utah Utes, and Utah State Aggies. The Weber State Wildcats (a member of the Football Championship Subdivision) were originally eligible to win the trophy and games against them counted towards their opponents' record when determining the winner of the trophy. It is unclear when this stopped being the case, but it was at least by 2012, when Utah State won the trophy over BYU (BYU's win over Weber State was not counted towards their instate record).

In the case of three-way ties between the schools, the winner was chosen by vote of the in-state media. Such an event has happened four times previously: in 1973, 1997, 2010, and 2012. Utah State was awarded the trophy in each year. The 2017 season also ended with a tie where both Utah and Utah State defeated BYU, but did not play each other. However, no winner was officially awarded the Beehive Boot.

In addition to the Beehive Boot, BYU and Utah State also play for The Old Wagon Wheel. The same three universities, along with Weber State University, Southern Utah University, and Utah Valley University, also played for a statewide trophy in basketball called the Old Oquirrh Bucket until the 2010 season, when it was retired due to conference realignments. Along with the Florida Cup, Commander-in-Chief's Trophy and the Michigan MAC Trophy, the Beehive Boot is one of the few three-way FBS rivalries that presents a trophy to the winner.

== History ==
Brigham Young University has the most wins in the series with 23, followed by Utah with 15, and Utah State with 9. After residing in Logan on USU's campus for the first four years of its existence, the trophy spent most of the next two decades in the hands of BYU. The Cougars won the intrastate series 19 of the next 27 years, including five in a row from 1983 to 1987. Since the mid-1990s, the boot has been back and forth between Salt Lake and Provo many times. Utah had a brief period of success during the early part of this century, winning four straight Beehive Boots from 2002 to 2005. It has also made a couple of trips to Logan during the past couple of decades.

Historically, the trophy goes to the winner of the BYU-Utah game. Only nine times has that not happened: the years when Utah State has won it. Only four times in history has the winner of the Beehive Boot lost an intrastate game (Utah State in 1973, 1982, 1997, 2012).

Utah won the trophy in 2016 after being the only team with an unbeaten in-state record, but the trophy then stopped being awarded. In 2021, BYU defeated both Utah and Utah State, leading to having a de facto winner for the first time since 2016. BYU then inquired as to the whereabouts of the trophy, resulting with BYU claiming the trophy two weeks later after it was found by Utah.

== The Holy War ==
The "Holy War" is one of America's oldest and most heated college football rivalries. In fact, the schools even differ on when the first game was played. Utah claims that the first game was played in 1896 (when Brigham Young University was known as Brigham Young Academy). BYU on the other hand claims that the rivalry dates back to 1922, the first year BYU began playing football. For historical purposes, 1922 is the date most used when referring to the start of the Holy War. The Utes lead the all-time series 60–35–4. The Cougars are 27–20 since the Beehive Boot was created in 1971.

== The Old Wagon Wheel ==
BYU and Utah State have met for the Old Wagon Wheel 88 times, dating back to 1922, with BYU holding a 48–37–3 lead. BYU had beaten Utah State ten straight times before Utah State defeated BYU by the score of 31–16 on October 1, 2010. With the victory, Utah State reclaimed the Old Wagon Wheel for the first time since 1993, and subsequently took the trophy in 2014, 2017, and 2018.

== The Battle of the Brothers ==
The Utah/USU rivalry, often called the Battle of the Brothers, is the most played rivalry between any of the schools that participate in the Beehive Boot series, with 112 total all-time meetings. Utah leads the series 78–30–4, and Utah has won 22 victories in the last 25 meetings. The first game was played in 1892, a 12-0 Aggie victory, and the Utes and Aggies had met every year from 1944 to 2009 before taking a break. The Utes have won 31 of 42 meetings since the Boot was first awarded, with 5 of USU's 11 victories coming in the first 6 years after the trophy's creation.

== Winners of the trophy and results ==
Games against Weber State are included up until 1982, the last year that these games were certain to have counted towards each teams' interstate record. Between 2016 and 2020, there were no announced winners and it was retained by Utah.

Brigham Young victories	Utah victories	Utah State victories	Tied games	No game, not awarded

Season	Winner	BYU-Utah	BYU-USU	Utah-USU	References
Before Trophy Established
1892-1921	N/A	See Utah-BYU football rivalry Series tied 3-3	No game	See Utah-Utah State football rivalry Utah led 13-6-1	
1922	N/A	Utah 49-0	Utah State 42-3	Utah 14-0	
1923	N/A	Utah 15-0	Utah State 40-0	Utah State 21-13	
1924	N/A	Utah 35-6	Utah State 13-9	Tie 7-7	
1925	N/A	Utah 27-0	Utah State 14-0	Utah State 10-6	
1926	N/A	Utah 40-7	Tie 0-0	Utah 34-7	
1927	N/A	Utah 20-0	Utah State 22-0	Tie 0-0	
1928	N/A	Tie 0-0	Utah State 10-0	Utah 20-0	
1929	N/A	Utah 45-13	Brigham Young 7-6	Utah 26-7	
1930	N/A	Utah 34-7	Brigham Young 39-14	Utah 41-0	
1931	N/A	Utah 43-0	Brigham Young 6-0	Utah 34-0	
1932	N/A	Utah 29-0	Brigham Young 18-6	Utah 16-0	
1933	N/A	Utah 21-6	Utah State 14-0	Utah 14-6	
1934	N/A	Utah 43-0	Utah State 15-0	Utah 14-7	
1935	N/A	Utah 32-0	Utah State 27-0	Tie 14-14	
1936	N/A	Utah 18-0	Utah State 13-0	Utah State 12-0	
1937	N/A	Utah 14-0	Brigham Young 54-0	Utah 27-0	
1938	N/A	Tie 7-7	Utah State 3-0	Utah 33-0	
1939	N/A	Utah 35-13	Tie 0-0	Utah 27-0	
1940	N/A	Utah 12-6	Brigham Young 12-7	Utah State 7-0	
1941	N/A	Tie 6-6	Utah State 28-0	Utah 33-21	
1942	N/A	Brigham Young 12-7	Utah State 9-6	Utah 34-6	
1943	N/A	No game	No game	No game	
1944	N/A	No game	No game	Utah 47-0	
1945	N/A	No game	No game	Utah 24-6	
1946	N/A	Utah 35-6	Tie 0-0	Utah State 22-14	
1947	N/A	Utah 28-6	Brigham Young 27-12	Utah 40-14	
1948	N/A	Utah 30-0	Utah State 20-7	Utah 41-7	
1949	N/A	Utah 38-0	Utah State 22-3	Utah 34-0	
1950	N/A	Tie 28-28	Brigham Young 34-13	Utah 46-0	
1951	N/A	Utah 7-6	Brigham Young 28-27	Utah 28-20	
1952	N/A	Utah 34-6	Utah State 27-26	Utah 20-0	
1953	N/A	Utah 33-32	Utah State 14-7	Utah 33-13	
1954	N/A	Utah 12-7	Utah State 45-13	Utah State 35-19	
1955	N/A	Utah 41-9	Utah State 47-21	Utah 14-13	
1956	N/A	Utah 41-6	Utah State 33-7	Utah 29-7	
1957	N/A	Utah 27-0	Brigham Young 14-0	Utah 21-6	
1958	N/A	Brigham Young 14-7	Brigham Young 13-6	Utah 12-7	
1959	N/A	Utah 20-8	Brigham Young 18-0	Utah 35-21	
1960	N/A	Utah 17-0	Brigham Young 34-0	Utah 6-0	
1961	N/A	Utah 21-20	Utah State 31-8	Utah State 17-6	
1962	N/A	Utah 35-20	Utah State 27-21	Utah State 19-6	
1963	N/A	Utah 15-6	Utah State 26-0	Utah 25-23	
1964	N/A	Utah 47-13	Brigham Young 28-14	Utah 14-6	
1965	N/A	Brigham Young 25-20	Utah State 34-21	Utah State 14-7	
1966	N/A	Brigham Young 35-13	Brigham Young 27-7	Utah State 13-7	
1967	N/A	Brigham Young 17-13	Utah State 30-9	Utah State 19-18	
1968	N/A	Utah 30-21	Utah State 34–8	Utah State 28–13	
1969	N/A	Utah 16-6	Brigham Young 21–3	Utah 27-7	
1970	N/A	Utah 14-13	Brigham Young 27–20	Utah 17–0	
Trophy Established
1971	Utah State (1)	Utah 17–15	Utah State 29–7	Utah State 21–17	
1972	Utah State (2)	Brigham Young 16–7	Utah State 42–19	Utah State 44–16	
1973	Utah State (3); Won by media vote	Brigham Young 46–22	Utah State 13–7	Utah 31–28	
1974	Utah State (4)	Brigham Young 48–20	Utah State 9–6	Utah State 34–0	
1975	Brigham Young (1)	Brigham Young 51–20	Brigham Young 24–7	Utah State 13–7	
1976	Brigham Young (2)	Brigham Young 34–12	Brigham Young 28–17	Utah State 36–10	
1977	Brigham Young (3)	Brigham Young 38–8	Brigham Young 65–6	Utah 20–0	
1978	Utah (1)	Utah 23–22	Utah State 24–7	Utah 23–20	
1979	Brigham Young (4)	Brigham Young 27–0	Brigham Young 48–24	Utah State 47–21	
1980	Brigham Young (5)	Brigham Young 56–6	Brigham Young 70–46	Utah 23–19	
1981	Brigham Young (6)	Brigham Young 56–28	Brigham Young 32–26	Utah 10–0	
1982	Utah State (5); 2-1 in-state record	Brigham Young 17–12	Utah State 20–17	Utah 42–10	
1983	Brigham Young (7)	Brigham Young 55–7	Brigham Young 38–34	Utah State 21–17	
1984	Brigham Young (8)	Brigham Young 24–14	Brigham Young 38–13	Utah 21–10	
1985	Brigham Young (9)	Brigham Young 38–28	Brigham Young 44–0	Utah 34–7	
1986	Brigham Young (10)	Brigham Young 35–21	Brigham Young 52–0	Utah 27–10	
1987	Brigham Young (11)	Brigham Young 21–18	Brigham Young 45–24	Utah State 41–36	
1988	Utah (2)	Utah 57–28	Brigham Young 38–3	Utah 42–21	
1989	Brigham Young (12)	Brigham Young 70–31	Brigham Young 37–10	Utah 45–10	
1990	Brigham Young (13)	Brigham Young 45–22	Brigham Young 45–10	Utah 19–10	
1991	Brigham Young (14)	Brigham Young 48–17	Brigham Young 38–12	Utah 12–7	
1992	Brigham Young (15)	Brigham Young 31–22	Brigham Young 30–9	Utah 42–18	
1993	Utah (3)	Utah 34–31	Utah State 58–56	Utah 31–29	
1994	Utah (4)	Utah 34–31	Brigham Young 34–6	Utah 32–17	
1995	Utah (5)	Utah 34–17	No game	Utah 40–20	
1996	Brigham Young (16)	Brigham Young 37–17	Brigham Young 45–17	Utah State 20–17	
1997	Utah State (6); Won by media vote	Utah 20–14	Brigham Young 42–35	Utah State 21–14	
1998	Brigham Young (17)	Brigham Young 26–24	No game	Utah 20–12	
1999	Utah (6)	Utah 20–17	Brigham Young 34–31	Utah 38–18	
2000	Brigham Young (18)	Brigham Young 34–27	Brigham Young 38–14	Utah 35–14	
2001	Brigham Young (19)	Brigham Young 24–21	Brigham Young 54–34	Utah 23–19	
2002	Utah (7)	Utah 13–6	Brigham Young 35–34	Utah 23–3	
2003	Utah (8)	Utah 3–0	No game	Utah 40–20	
2004	Utah (9)	Utah 52–21	No game	Utah 48–6	
2005	Utah (10)	Utah 41–34 (OT)	No game	Utah 31–7	
2006	Brigham Young (20)	Brigham Young 33–31	Brigham Young 38–0	Utah 48–0	
2007	Brigham Young (21)	Brigham Young 17–10	No game	Utah 34–18	
2008	Utah (11)	Utah 48–24	Brigham Young 34–14	Utah 58–10	
2009	Brigham Young (22)	Brigham Young 26–23 (OT)	Brigham Young 35–17	Utah 35–17	
2010	Utah State (7); Won by media vote	Utah 17–16	Utah State 31–16	No game	
2011	Utah (12)	Utah 54–10	Brigham Young 27–24	No game	
2012	Utah State (8); Won by media vote	Utah 24–21	Brigham Young 6–3	Utah State 27–20	
2013	Utah (13)	Utah 20–13	Brigham Young 31–14	Utah 30–26	
2014	Utah State (9)	No game	Utah State 35–20	No game	
2015	Utah (14)	Utah 35–28	Brigham Young 51–28	Utah 24–14	
2016	Utah (15)	Utah 20–19	Brigham Young 28–10	No game	
2017	Not awarded	Utah 19–13	Utah State 40–24	No game	
2018	Not awarded	Utah 35–27	Utah State 45–20	No game	
2019	Not awarded	Utah 30–12	Brigham Young 42–14	No game	
2020	Not awarded	No game	No game	No game	
2021	Brigham Young (23)	Brigham Young 26–17	Brigham Young 34–20	No game	
2022	Not awarded	No game	Brigham Young 38-26	No game	
2023	Not awarded	No game	No game	No game	
2024	Not awarded	Brigham Young 22-21	No game	Utah 38–21	
2025	Not awarded	Brigham Young 24–21	No game	No game	
2026	Utah (16)	Utah 28–20	No game	Utah 33–0	

== See also ==
- List of NCAA college football rivalry games
- List of most-played college football series in NCAA Division I
- Old Oquirrh Bucket similar historic trophy for Basketball, that includes additional Utah schools.
