= 2000 Humanitarian Bowl =

UTEP Miners	Boise State Broncos
(8–3)	(9–2)
WAC	Big West
23	38
Head coach: Gary Nord	Head coach: Dirk Koetter
	1	2	3	4	Total
UTEP	0	10	3	10	23
Boise State	7	10	7	14	38
- Date: December 28, 2000
- Season: 2000
- Stadium: Bronco Stadium
- Location: Boise, Idaho
- MVP: QB Bart Hendricks (Boise State); RB Chris Porter (UTEP)
- Referee: Rogers Redding (SEC)
- Attendance: 26,203
- Payout: US$750,000 per team

United States TV coverage
- Network: ESPN2
- Announcers: Wayne Larrivee; Randy Wright; Jim Barbar

The 2000 Humanitarian Bowl was the 4th edition of the bowl game. It featured the Boise State Broncos, and the UTEP Miners.

== Background ==
In their final season in the Big West Conference, the Broncos went 5–0 in conference play, being the final champion of the Big West Conference. It was their 2nd conference title since joining Division I-A in 1996. As for the Miners, they had finished as co-champion of the Western Athletic Conference (which occurred after a loss to #15 TCU), their first conference title since 1956. This was UTEP's first bowl since 1988 and Boise State's 2nd straight Humanitarian Bowl.

== Game summary ==
Boise State scored first on a 28-yard touchdown pass from quarterback Bart Hendricks to Jay Swillie giving the Broncos a 7–0 lead. In the second quarter, Nick Calaycay kicked a 41-yard field goal to give the Broncos a 10–0 lead. UTEP got on the board following a 9-yard connection from Rocky Perez to Joey Knapp making it 10–7. A 28-yard field goal from Ricky Bishop tied the contest at 10. With only 23 seconds left in the half, Bart Hendricks rushed 12 yards for a touchdown, giving Boise State a 17–10 lead at intermission.

In the third quarter, Bart Hendricks scored on a 77-yard touchdown run, increasing Boise State's lead to 24–10. Ricky Bishop of UTEP made a 43-yard field goal to make it 24–13.

In the fourth quarter, Brock Forsey scored on a 43-yard touchdown run, making the lead 31–13. UTEP would attempt to come back on a 47-yard field goal from Ricky Bishop, and a 3-yard Chris Porter touchdown run to make it 31–23. Hendricks scored on an 11-yard pass from Banks to make the final score 38–23. The victory was the second consecutive Humanitarian Bowl victory for Boise State.

== Scoring Summary ==
Scoring summary

Quarter	Time	Drive			Team	Scoring information	Score	
Quarter	Time	Plays	Yards	TOP	Team	Scoring information	UTEP	BSU
1					BSU	Jay Swillie 28-yard touchdown reception from Bart Hendricks, Nick Calaycay kick good	0	7
2					BSU	41-yard field goal by Nick Calaycay	0	10
2					UTEP	Joey Knapp 9-yard touchdown reception from Rocky Perez, Ricky Bishop kick good	7	10
2					UTEP	28-yard field goal by Ricky Bishop	10	10
2					BSU	Bart Hendricks 12-yard touchdown run, Nick Calaycay kick good	10	17
3					BSU	Bart Hendricks 77-yard touchdown run, Nick Calaycay kick good	10	24
3					UTEP	43-yard field goal by Ricky Bishop	13	24
4					BSU	Brock Forsey 41-yard touchdown run, Nick Calaycay kick good	13	31
4					UTEP	47-yard field goal by Ricky Bishop	16	31
4					UTEP	Chris Porter 3-yard touchdown run, Ricky Bishop kick good	23	31
4					BSU	Bart Hendricks 11-yard touchdown reception from Andre Banks, Nick Calaycay kick good	23	38
"TOP" = time of possession. For other American football terms, see Glossary of American football.							23	38

=== Statistics ===
	1	2	3	4	Total
Miners	0	10	3	10	23
Broncos	7	10	7	14	38

Statistics	UTEP	BSU
First downs	22	18
Plays–yards	82-319	59-433
Rushes–yards	44–118	29–175
Passing yards	201	258
Passing: Comp–Att–Int	17–38–1	18–30–1
Time of possession	32:55	27:05
