= Chuckie Keeton =

American football player and coach (born 1993)

New England Patriots
- Title: Offensive assistant

Personal information
- Born: June 15, 1993 (age 33); Houston, Texas, U.S.
- Listed height: 6 ft 1 in (1.85 m)
- Listed weight: 206 lb (93 kg)

Career information
- Position: Quarterback
- College: Utah State (2011–2015)

Career history
- Oregon State (2016–2017) Graduate assistant; Utah State (2018) Graduate assistant; Texas Tech (2019–2020) Graduate assistant; Utah State (2021–2022) Running backs coach; Marshall (2023) Offensive analyst; Seattle Seahawks (2024) Offensive assistant; New England Patriots (2025–present) Offensive assistant

Awards and highlights
- Second-team All-WAC (2012)

Charles Adam Keeton IV (born June 15, 1993) is an American football coach and former quarterback. He played college football for the Utah State Aggies.

== College career ==
As a true freshman in 2011, Keeton started eight of nine games, completing 106 of 174 passes for 1,200 yards with 11 touchdowns and two interceptions. In 2012, he started all 13 games, completing 275 of 407 passes for 3,373 yards 27 touchdowns and nine interceptions. He was a first team All-WAC selection. From 2013 to 2015, his career was plagued by injuries. He played in only six games in 2013, three in 2014, and seven in 2015.

Pre-draft measurables
Height	Weight	Arm length	Hand span	Wingspan	40-yard dash	10-yard split	20-yard split	20-yard shuttle	Three-cone drill	Vertical jump	Broad jump
6 ft 1 in (1.85 m)	206 lb (93 kg)	31 5/8 in (0.80 m)	9 1/8 in (0.23 m)	6 ft 6 in (1.98 m)	4.67 s	1.69 s	2.78 s	4.51 s	7.28 s	32.0 in (0.81 m)	9 ft 8 in (2.95 m)
All values from Pro Day

== Coaching career ==
In 2016, Keeton joined Oregon State as a graduate assistant.

In 2018, Keeton joined Utah State as a graduate assistant.

In 2019, Keeton joined Texas Tech as a graduate assistant.

In 2021, Keeton was rehired by Utah State as the running backs coach.

In 2023, Keeton was hired as an offensive analyst for Marshall.

In 2024, Keeton was hired as the quarterbacks coach for Montana State. Shortly after being hired at Montana State, the Seattle Seahawks hired him as an offensive assistant.

On February 5, 2025, the New England Patriots hired Keeton to serve as an offensive assistant under head coach Mike Vrabel.
