= Battle of the Brothers =

American college football rivalry

- Utah Utes Utah State Aggies
- First meeting: November 25, 1892; Utah Agricultural, 12–0
- Latest meeting: September 19, 2026; Utah, 33–0
- Next meeting: September 14, 2030
- Trophy: Beehive Boot

Statistics
- Total meetings: 115
- All-time series: Utah leads, 81–30–4 (.722)
- Largest victory: Utah, 48–0 (2006)
- Longest win streak: Utah, 12 (1998–2009)
- Current win streak: Utah, 4 (2013–present)

Locations of Utah and Utah State

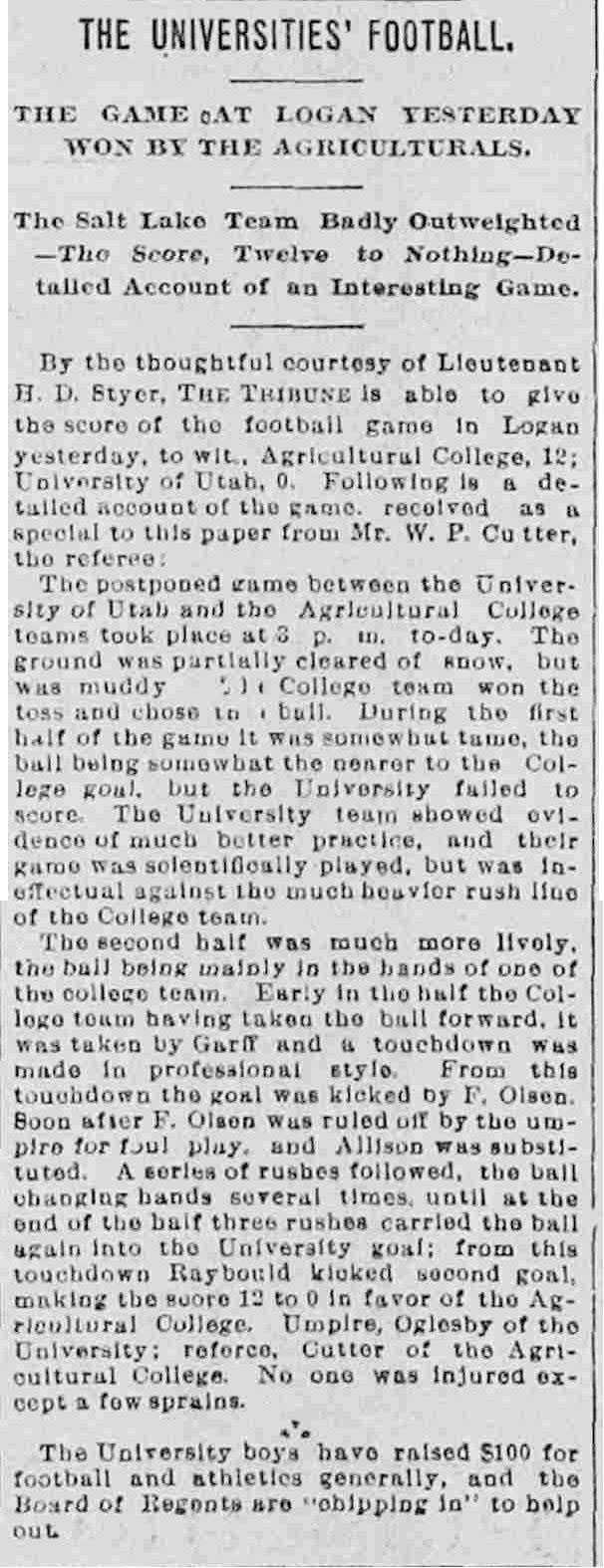
An article from The Salt Lake Tribune reporting on the inaugural game.

The Utah-Utah State football rivalry, commonly referred to as the Battle of the Brothers and previously as the Governor's Trophy, is an American college football rivalry in Utah between the University of Utah Utes of Salt Lake City and the Utah State University Aggies of Logan. Utah leads the series 81–30–4 (.722).

The rivalry began in 1892 when Utah State (then the Agricultural College of Utah) defeated Utah 12-0 in the first game for both programs on November 25. For much of its history, whenever the two teams played in Salt Lake City, it was held on Thanksgiving Day. However, this aspect of the rivalry ended in 1958. Since 1959, no meeting has been played on Thanksgiving Day; and more recently, the meeting has been held in September as one of the first games of the season for both teams. Utah and Utah State have not competed in the same conference since 1961, meaning each meeting since then has been a voluntary non-conference game.

In the 1970s, Utah and its fans turned their sights towards Brigham Young University as their biggest rival, and the Holy War became the main rivalry in the state of Utah.

Following the Utes' 2015 win, no further meetings had been scheduled until December 14, 2023, when a 2-for-1 home and home series was announced by the two schools, with a game in 2024 taking place in Logan and further meetings in 2026 and 2031 taking place in Salt Lake City. On March 23, 2026, an additional home-and-home series was announced, with a game in 2031 taking place in Logan and a game in 2033 taking place in Salt Lake City. The game that was originally scheduled in 2031 in Salt Lake City was moved to 2030. In the entire history of the rivalry, the game has never been contested anywhere beside Logan or Salt Lake City.

== Game results ==
Until 1957, the Aggies were known as the Utah State Agricultural College, or Utah A.C.

Utah victories	Utah State victories	Tie games

No.	Date	Location	Winner	Score
1	November 25, 1892	Logan	U.A.C.	12–0
2	November 17, 1900	Logan	Utah	21–0
3	November 9, 1901	Salt Lake City	Utah	17–0
4	November 15, 1902	Salt Lake City	Utah	18–0
5	October 17, 1903	Logan	U.A.C.	17–0
6	November 19, 1904	Salt Lake City	Utah	43–0
7	November 25, 1905	Logan	Utah	5–0
8	November 29, 1906	Salt Lake City	Utah	35–0 L
9	November 9, 1907	Salt Lake City	Utah	10–0
10	October 9, 1909	Logan	Utah	28–0
11	November 25, 1909	Salt Lake City	Utah	22–0
12	October 8, 1910	Logan	Utah	21–12
13	November 24, 1910	Salt Lake City	Utah	6–0
14	November 28, 1912	Salt Lake City	Tie	7–7
15	November 27, 1913	Logan	U.A.C.	21–0
16	November 26, 1914	Salt Lake City	Utah	20–2
17	November 25, 1915	Salt Lake City	Utah	14–0
18	November 11, 1916	Salt Lake City	Utah	46–0
19	November 29, 1917	Salt Lake City	U.A.C.	14–0
20	November 29, 1919	Salt Lake City	Utah	10–0
21	November 25, 1920	Salt Lake City	U.A.C.	9–3
22	November 24, 1921	Salt Lake City	U.A.C.	14–3
23	November 30, 1922	Salt Lake City	Utah	14–0
24	November 29, 1923	Salt Lake City	U.A.C.	21–13
25	November 27, 1924	Salt Lake City	Tie	7–7
26	November 26, 1925	Salt Lake City	U.A.C.	10–6
27	November 25, 1926	Salt Lake City	Utah	34–0
28	November 24, 1927	Salt Lake City	Tie	0–0
29	November 29, 1928	Salt Lake City	Utah	20–0
30	November 28, 1929	Salt Lake City	Utah	26–7
31	November 27, 1930	Salt Lake City	Utah	41–0
32	November 26, 1931	Salt Lake City	Utah	34–0
33	October 29, 1932	Salt Lake City	Utah	16–0
34	October 28, 1933	Salt Lake City	Utah	14–6
35	November 29, 1934	Salt Lake City	Utah	14–7
36	November 28, 1935	Salt Lake City	Tie	14–14
37	October 24, 1936	Logan	U.A.C.	12–0
38	November 25, 1937	Salt Lake City	Utah	27–0
39	October 22, 1938	Logan	Utah	33–0
40	November 23, 1939	Salt Lake City	Utah	27–0
41	October 19, 1940	Logan	U.A.C.	7–0
42	November 26, 1941	Salt Lake City	Utah	33–21
43	October 17, 1942	Logan	Utah	34–6
44	November 23, 1944	Salt Lake City	Utah	47–0
45	November 22, 1945	Salt Lake City	Utah	24–6
46	November 28, 1946	Salt Lake City	U.A.C.	22–14
47	November 27, 1947	Salt Lake City	Utah	40–14
48	November 25, 1948	Salt Lake City	Utah	41–7
49	November 24, 1949	Salt Lake City	Utah	34–0
50	November 23, 1950	Salt Lake City	Utah	46–0
51	November 3, 1951	Logan	Utah	28–20
52	November 27, 1952	Salt Lake City	Utah	20–0
53	October 10, 1953	Logan	Utah	33–13
54	November 25, 1954	Salt Lake City	U.A.C.	35–19
55	November 24, 1955	Salt Lake City	Utah	14–13
56	November 22, 1956	Salt Lake City	Utah	29–7
57	November 28, 1957	Salt Lake City	Utah	21–6
58	November 27, 1958	Salt Lake City	Utah	12–7
59	November 21, 1959	Salt Lake City	Utah	35–21
60	November 19, 1960	Salt Lake City	Utah	6–0
61	November 18, 1961	Salt Lake City	Utah State	17–6
62	November 17, 1962	Salt Lake City	Utah State	19–6
63	November 23, 1963	Logan	Utah	25–23
64	November 21, 1964	Salt Lake City	Utah	14–6
65	November 20, 1965	Salt Lake City	Utah State	14–7
66	November 19, 1966	Salt Lake City	Utah State	13–7
67	November 18, 1967	Salt Lake City	Utah State	19–18
68	November 23, 1968	Logan	Utah State	28–13
69	November 1, 1969	Salt Lake City	Utah	27–7
70	November 7, 1970	Logan	Utah	17–0
71	November 13, 1971	Salt Lake City	Utah State	21–17
72	November 11, 1972	Logan	Utah State	44–16
73	November 17, 1973	Salt Lake City	Utah	31–28
74	November 16, 1974	Logan	Utah State	34–0
75	September 13, 1975	Salt Lake City	Utah State	13–7
76	October 16, 1976	Logan	Utah State	28–17
77	October 15, 1977	Salt Lake City	Utah	20–0
78	November 25, 1978	Logan	Utah	23–20
79	September 29, 1979	Salt Lake City	Utah State	47–21
80	October 4, 1980	Logan	Utah	23–19
81	September 5, 1981	Salt Lake City	Utah	10–0
82	November 6, 1982	Salt Lake City	Utah	42–10
83	November 12, 1983	Logan	Utah State	21–17
84	November 10, 1984	Logan	Utah	21–10
85	November 2, 1985	Salt Lake City	Utah	34–7
86	November 15, 1986	Logan	Utah	27–10
87	October 24, 1987	Salt Lake City	Utah State	41–36
88	November 12, 1988	Logan	Utah	42–21
89	September 9, 1989	Salt Lake City	Utah	45–10
90	September 1, 1990	Logan	Utah	19–0
91	August 31, 1991	Salt Lake City	Utah	12–7
92	September 12, 1992	Logan	Utah	42–18
93	September 11, 1993	Salt Lake City	Utah	31–29
94	September 3, 1994	Logan	Utah	32–17
95	October 28, 1995	Salt Lake City	Utah	40–20
96	August 31, 1996	Logan	Utah State	20–17
97	August 30, 1997	Salt Lake City	Utah State	21–11
98	September 5, 1998	Logan	Utah	20–12
99	September 18, 1999	Salt Lake City	Utah	38–18
100	September 30, 2000	Logan	Utah	35–14
101	September 1, 2001	Salt Lake City	Utah	23–19
102	August 31, 2002	Logan	Utah	23–3
103	August 28, 2003	Salt Lake City	Utah	40–20
104	September 18, 2004	Logan	#15 Utah	48–6
105	September 10, 2005	Salt Lake City	Utah	31–7
106	September 16, 2006	Logan	Utah	48–0
107	September 29, 2007	Salt Lake City	Utah	34–18
108	September 13, 2008	Logan	#22 Utah	58–10
109	September 3, 2009	Salt Lake City	#19 Utah	35–17
110	September 7, 2012	Logan	Utah State	27–20 ^{OT}
111	August 29, 2013	Salt Lake City	Utah	30–26
112	September 11, 2015	Salt Lake City	#24 Utah	24–14
113	September 14, 2024	Logan	#12 Utah	38–21
114	September 19, 2026	Salt Lake City	#17 Utah	33–0
Series: Utah leads 81–29–4
From 1888 to 1927, Utah State University was known as the Agricultural College of Utah (U.A.C.), and was then known as Utah State Agricultural College (also U.A.C.) until 1957.

== See also ==
- Beehive Boot
- List of NCAA college football rivalry games
- List of most-played college football series in NCAA Division I
