= BYU–Utah State football rivalry =

American college football rivalry

- BYU Cougars Utah State Aggies
- First meeting: October 7, 1922; Utah A.C., 42–3
- Latest meeting: September 29, 2022; BYU, 38–26
- Trophy: The Old Wagon Wheel

Statistics
- Total meetings: 91
- All-time series: BYU leads, 51–37–3
- Largest victory: BYU, 65–6 (1977)
- Longest win streak: BYU, 10 (1983–1992, 1994–2009)
- Current win streak: BYU, 3 (2019–present)

Locations of BYU and Utah State

The BYU–Utah State football rivalry is an American college football rivalry between the Brigham Young Cougars and Utah State Aggies.

They have met for the Old Wagon Wheel 65 times, dating back to 1948. However, the rivalry predates the Old Wagon Wheel trophy era. The rivalry series between the two schools was largely dominated in the early years by Utah State until 1974. For the next three decades, BYU generally dominated the series with BYU winning ten straight times before the Aggies defeated the Cougars 31–16 on October 1, 2010. With the victory, Utah State reclaimed the Old Wagon Wheel for the first time since 1993. The Old Wagon Wheel also returned to Utah State on October 3, 2014, when they beat BYU 35–20. Starting in 1981, the two teams have usually met on the first Friday of October, which has certain significance since it is generally the same weekend that the Church of Jesus Christ of Latter-day Saints (LDS) holds its semiannual worldwide General Conference.

The battle for the Old Wagon Wheel is an important cultural event in the state of Utah given the longstanding rivalry between the two schools and the fact that the majority of the student body at both schools recognize themselves to be members of the Church of Jesus Christ of Latter-day Saints. Many families with LDS association, both within and outside the state of Utah, have familial ties to both institutions.

The game is also part of a three-way rivalry among Division I FBS universities from the state of Utah: BYU, U of U, and Utah State. The winner of the series wins a trophy known as the Beehive Boot.

BYU announced they have canceled the following four games (2023-2026) they had agreed to in their contract, as their move into the Big 12 will require them to accommodate conference schedules. The contract did have a clause designed for such a scenario as conference affiliation changes. It is unclear after 2022 when the rivalry will continue.

== Game results ==
BYU victories	Utah State victories	Tie games

No.	Date	Location	Winner	Score
1	October 7, 1922	Provo	Utah A.C.	42–3
2	November 12, 1923	Logan	Utah A.C.	40–0
3	November 7, 1924	Provo	Utah A.C.	13–9
4	October 24, 1925	Logan	Utah A.C.	14–0
5	October 15, 1926	Provo	Tie	0–0
6	October 29, 1927	Logan	Utah A.C.	22–0
7	October 27, 1928	Provo	Utah A.C.	10–0
8	October 19, 1929	Logan	BYU	7–6
9	November 1, 1930	Ogden	BYU	39–14
10	November 7, 1931	Ogden	BYU	6–0
11	November 19, 1932	Provo	BYU	18–6
12	November 18, 1933	Logan	Utah A.C.	14–0
13	November 3, 1934	Provo	Utah A.C.	15–0
14	November 16, 1935	Logan	Utah A.C.	27–0
15	October 17, 1936	Provo	Utah A.C.	13–0
16	November 13, 1937	Logan	BYU	54–0
17	November 5, 1938	Provo	Utah A.C.	3–0
18	November 11, 1939	Logan	Tie	0–0
19	November 2, 1940	Provo	BYU	12–7
20	November 1, 1941	Logan	BYU	28–0
21	October 31, 1942	Provo	Utah A.C.	9–6
22	November 9, 1946	Logan	Tie	0–0
23	October 25, 1947	Provo	BYU	27–12
24	October 23, 1948	Logan	Utah A.C.	20–7
25	November 5, 1949	Provo	Utah A.C.	22–3
26	November 4, 1950	Logan	BYU	34–13
27	November 10, 1951	Provo	BYU	28–27
28	November 15, 1952	Logan	Utah A.C.	27–26
29	October 16, 1953	Provo	Utah A.C.	14–7
30	October 30, 1954	Logan	Utah A.C.	45–13
31	November 5, 1955	Provo	Utah A.C.	47–21
32	October 27, 1956	Logan	Utah A.C.	33–7
33	November 2, 1957	Provo	BYU	14–0
34	November 1, 1958	Logan	BYU	13–6
35	October 31, 1959	Provo	BYU	18–0
36	October 29, 1960	Logan	Utah State	34–0
37	November 4, 1961	Provo	Utah State	31–8
38	October 27, 1962	Logan	Utah State	27–21
39	November 2, 1963	Provo	Utah State	26–0
40	October 31, 1964	Provo	BYU	28–14
41	October 30, 1965	Logan	Utah State	34–21
42	October 8, 1966	Provo	BYU	27–7
43	November 4, 1967	Logan	Utah State	30–9
44	November 9, 1968	Provo	Utah State	34–8
45	November 15, 1969	Logan	BYU	21–3
46	October 24, 1970	Provo	BYU	27–20

No.	Date	Location	Winner	Score
47	October 9, 1971	Logan	Utah State	29–7
48	September 23, 1972	Provo	Utah State	42–19
49	October 6, 1973	Logan	Utah State	13–7
50	September 21, 1974	Provo	Utah State	9–6
51	November 8, 1975	Logan	BYU	24–7
52	October 23, 1976	Provo	BYU	45–14
53	September 24, 1977	Logan	#20 BYU	65–6
54	October 7, 1978	Provo	Utah State	24–7
55	October 13, 1979	Logan	#16 BYU	48–24
56	October 18, 1980	Logan	BYU	70–46
57	October 2, 1981	Provo	#10 BYU	32–26
58	October 30, 1982	Logan	Utah State	20–17
59	October 29, 1983	Provo	#15 BYU	38–34
60	November 24, 1984	Provo	#1 BYU	38–13
61	November 9, 1985	Logan	#18 BYU	44–0
62	September 6, 1986	Provo	#18 BYU	52–0
63	October 2, 1987	Provo	BYU	45–24
64	September 30, 1988	Provo	BYU	38–3
65	September 30, 1989	Logan	BYU	37–10
66	November 24, 1990	Provo	#4 BYU	45–10
67	October 4, 1991	Provo	BYU	38–10
68	October 2, 1992	Provo	BYU	30–9
69	October 30, 1993	Logan	Utah State	58–56
70	September 30, 1994	Provo	BYU	34–6
71	October 4, 1996	Logan	#21 BYU	45–17
72	October 3, 1997	Provo	#24 BYU	42–35
73	October 1, 1999	Logan	BYU	34–31
74	October 6, 2000	Provo	BYU	38–14
75	October 5, 2001	Provo	#20 BYU	54–34
76	October 4, 2002	Logan	BYU	35–34
77	September 23, 2006	Provo	BYU	38–0
78	October 3, 2008	Logan	#8 BYU	34–14
79	October 2, 2009	Provo	#20 BYU	35–17
80	October 1, 2010	Logan	Utah State	31–16
81	September 30, 2011	Provo	BYU	27–24
82	October 5, 2012	Provo	BYU	6–3
83	October 4, 2013	Logan	BYU	31–14
84	October 3, 2014	Provo	Utah State	35–20
85	November 28, 2015	Logan	BYU	51–28
86	November 26, 2016	Provo	BYU	28–10
87	September 29, 2017	Logan	Utah State	40–24
88	October 5, 2018	Provo	Utah State	45–20
89	November 2, 2019	Logan	BYU	42–14
90	October 1, 2021	Logan	#13 BYU	34–20
91	September 29, 2022	Provo	#19 BYU	38–26
Series: BYU leads 51–37–3

== See also ==
- List of NCAA college football rivalry games
- Beehive Boot
