= List of Boise State University people =

This list of Boise State University people includes notable graduates, non-graduate former students, and administrators affiliated with Boise State University, a public research university in Boise, Idaho. As of 2015, the university has approximately 22,000 current students and over 80,000 living alumni.

Bachelor's degrees were first awarded in the late 1960s; degrees granted prior to this are associates only.

== Business and finance ==
| Name | Class year(s) | Notability | Reference |
|---|---|---|---|
| William Agee | 1958 | Former president and CEO of Bendix Corporation and Morrison-Knudsen | |
| Steve Appleton | 1983 | Chairman and CEO of Micron Technology | |
| Butch Otter | 1964 | Former president of Simplot International | |
| Larry Williams | 1964 | Founder and president of Idaho Timber Corp. | |

== Government and public policy ==
| Name | Class year(s) | Notability | Reference |
|---|---|---|---|
| Robert Bakes | 1952 | Former chief justice of the Idaho Supreme Court | |
| Bethine Church | 1943 | Widow of U.S. Senator Frank Church; Democratic political organizer; winner of the Lawrence O'Brien Award | |
| Celia Gould | 1979 | Director of the Idaho Department of Agriculture; former eight-term Idaho state legislator | |
| Sergio Gutierrez | 1980 | Judge on the Idaho Court of Appeals | |
| Kate Kelly | 1991 | Senate minority leader in the Idaho Legislature | |
| Edward Lodge | 1955 | Federal judge on the United States District Court for the District of Idaho | |
| Tom Luna | 1985 | Former superintendent of Public Instruction for the state of Idaho | |
| Mike O'Callaghan | 1950 | Former governor of Nevada and executive director of Las Vegas Sun; earned the Bronze Star in Korea | |
| Butch Otter | 1964 | Former governor of Idaho; former U.S. congressman and four-term lieutenant governor of Idaho | |
| Bill Sali | 1981 | Former U.S. congressman and eight-term representative in the Idaho Legislature | |

== Arts, media, and entertainment ==
| Name | Class year(s) | Notability | Reference |
|---|---|---|---|
| William Anderson | 1939 | Best-selling author of 22 books; BAT-21 sold a million copies and became a Hollywood movie | |
| Earl Boen | 1961 | Hollywood actor with roles in over 50 films and 400 televisions appearances, including Naked Gun, the Terminator series, Seinfeld, The Golden Girls, LA Law, and The Wonder Years | |
| Randy Davison | | Actor who portrayed Joseph McCarthy in The United States vs. Billie Holiday and the maitre d' of the Café Trocadero in Mank | |
| Gary Green | 1968 | Award-winning conductor; Music Department chairman at the University of Miami | |
| Michael Hoffman | 1974 | Rhodes Scholar; Hollywood director of 13 movies, including several Oscar-winning titles | |
| Trevor Powers | withdrew c. 2010 | Musician; originally performed as Youth Lagoon from 2010–16; pursuing English degree during initial growth of music career | |
| Michelle Willis | 1996 | Popular composer of LDS and Christian music | |

== Academia and the sciences ==
| Name | Class year(s) | Notability | Reference |
|---|---|---|---|
| Gary L. Bennett | 1960 | Former manager at NASA; worked on the Voyager 1, Voyager 2, and New Horizons missions | |
| Gary Green | 1968 | Award-winning conductor; Music Department chairman at the University of Miami | |
| Radhika Ramana Dasa | 1999 | Professor at The College of William & Mary and Bhaktivedanta College | |
| Cheryl Schonhardt-Bailey | 1984 | Professor at London School of Economics and Political Science | |

== Sports ==
| Name | Class year(s) | Notability | Reference |
|---|---|---|---|
| Geraldo Boldewijn | | American football player | |
| Charles Burton | 1996 | Competed in the 2000 Summer Olympics in Men's Wrestling; wrestling coach at Nebraska | |
| Chris Childs | 1989 | Former NBA player with the New Jersey Nets, the New York Knicks, and the Toronto Raptors | |
| Ryan Clady | 2007 | Two-time NFL All-Pro left tackle for the Denver Broncos; first Pro Bowl appearance in 2009 | |
| Daryn Colledge | 2005 | NFL offensive guard for the Arizona Cardinals | |
| Chuck Compton | 1986 | Former NFL defensive back for the Green Bay Packers | |
| Tyrone Crawford | 2011 | NFL defensive end for the Dallas Cowboys; | |
| Graham DeLaet | 2004 | Professional golfer on the PGA Tour | |
| Elaine Elliott | 1977 | Head coach of the University of Utah's Women's Basketball team | |
| Korey Hall | 2006 | NFL fullback for the Arizona Cardinals | |
| Doc Haskell | 2012 | Head coach of Boise State Esports | |
| Chandler Hutchison | 2018 | Current NBA player for the Chicago Bulls | |
| Larry Jackson | 1952 | All-Star Major League pitcher with the St. Louis Cardinals, Chicago Cubs and Philadelphia Phillies | |
| Gus Johnson | 1962 | Five-time NBA All-Star player with the Baltimore Bullets | |
| Scott Jorgensen | (Psychology) | Three-time NCAA Wrestling qualifier; mixed martial artist, formerly competing in the Ultimate Fighting Championship | |
| Alva Liles | | Super Bowl XV champion Oakland Raiders | |
| Doug Martin | 2011 | Former NFL running back for the Tampa Bay Buccaneers | |
| Alexander Mattison | 2018 | NFL running back for the Minnesota Vikings | |
| Shea McClellin | 2011 | NFL defensive end for the Chicago Bears | |
| Ardie McInelly | 1982 | NCAA Division I head coach for Idaho State Bengals women's basketball (1996–2001) and Air Force Falcons women's basketball (2001–10) | |
| Cedric Minter | 1985 | Former NFL running back for the New York Jets; also CFL | |
| Kellen Moore | 2012 | Former NFL quarterback for the Dallas Cowboys (2015-2017); head coach New Orleans Saints (2025-present), offensive coordinator for Los Angeles Chargers (2023), offensive coordinator for the Super Bowl LIX champion Philadelphia Eagles (2024), quarterback coach for Dallas Cowboys (2018), and offensive coordinator for Dallas Cowboys (2019-2022) | |
| Jens Pulver | c. 1995 | Mixed martial arts fighter, first Ultimate Fighting Championship (UFC) lightweight champion, and former featherweight with World Extreme Cagefighting (WEC) | |
| Jeb Putzier | 2007 | Former NFL tight end for the Denver Broncos | |
| Orlando Scandrick | 2007 | Former NFL cornerback for the Kansas City Chiefs and the Dallas Cowboys | |
| Shawn Stasiak | 1994 | Former WWE wrestler and three-time World Tag Team Champion | |
| Don Summers | 1983 | Former NFL tight end for the Green Bay Packers and the Denver Broncos | |
| Kimo von Oelhoffen | 1994 | Former NFL defensive tackle for the Cincinnati Bengals and Super Bowl XL champion | |
| James Webb III | | Basketball player for Maccabi Tel Aviv in the Israeli Basketball Premier League | |
| Renward Wells | | Olympic runner in the 1996 and 2000 summer Olympic Games | |
| Dave Wilcox | 1962 | Former NFL linebacker for the San Francisco 49ers; inducted into the Pro Football Hall of Fame | |
| Kyle Wilson | 2009 | NFL cornerback for the NY Jets | |
| Roland Woolsey | 1974 | Former NFL safety for the Dallas Cowboys, Seattle Seahawks and Cleveland Browns | |
