= Buster Bronco =

Buster Bronco may refer to:

- Buster Bronco (Boise State), the mascot of Boise State University
- Buster Bronco (Western Michigan), the mascot of Western Michigan University
