= Chemeketa Community College =

Community college in Salem, Oregon, U.S.

Coordinates: 44°58′41″N 122°58′37″W

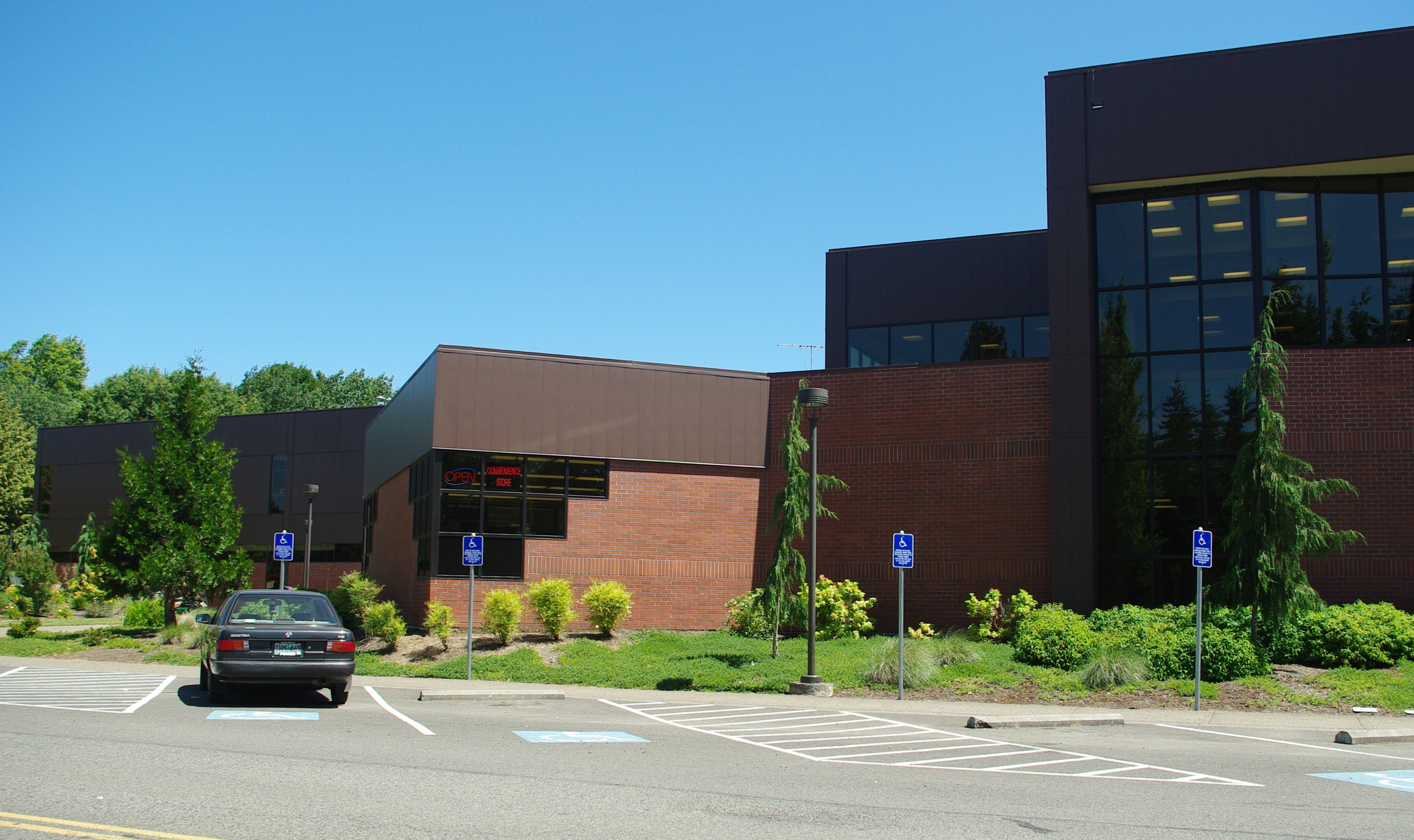
- Type: Public community college
- Established: 1969; 57 years ago
- President: Jessica Howard
- Total staff: 1,112
- Location: Salem, Oregon, United States
- Nickname: Storm
- Sporting affiliations: Northwest Athletic Conference
- Mascot: Bolt
- Website: www.chemeketa.edu

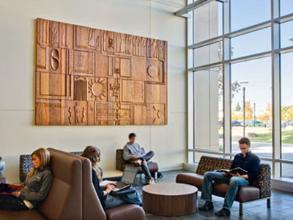
Chemeketa, Yamhill Valley Campus Lobby

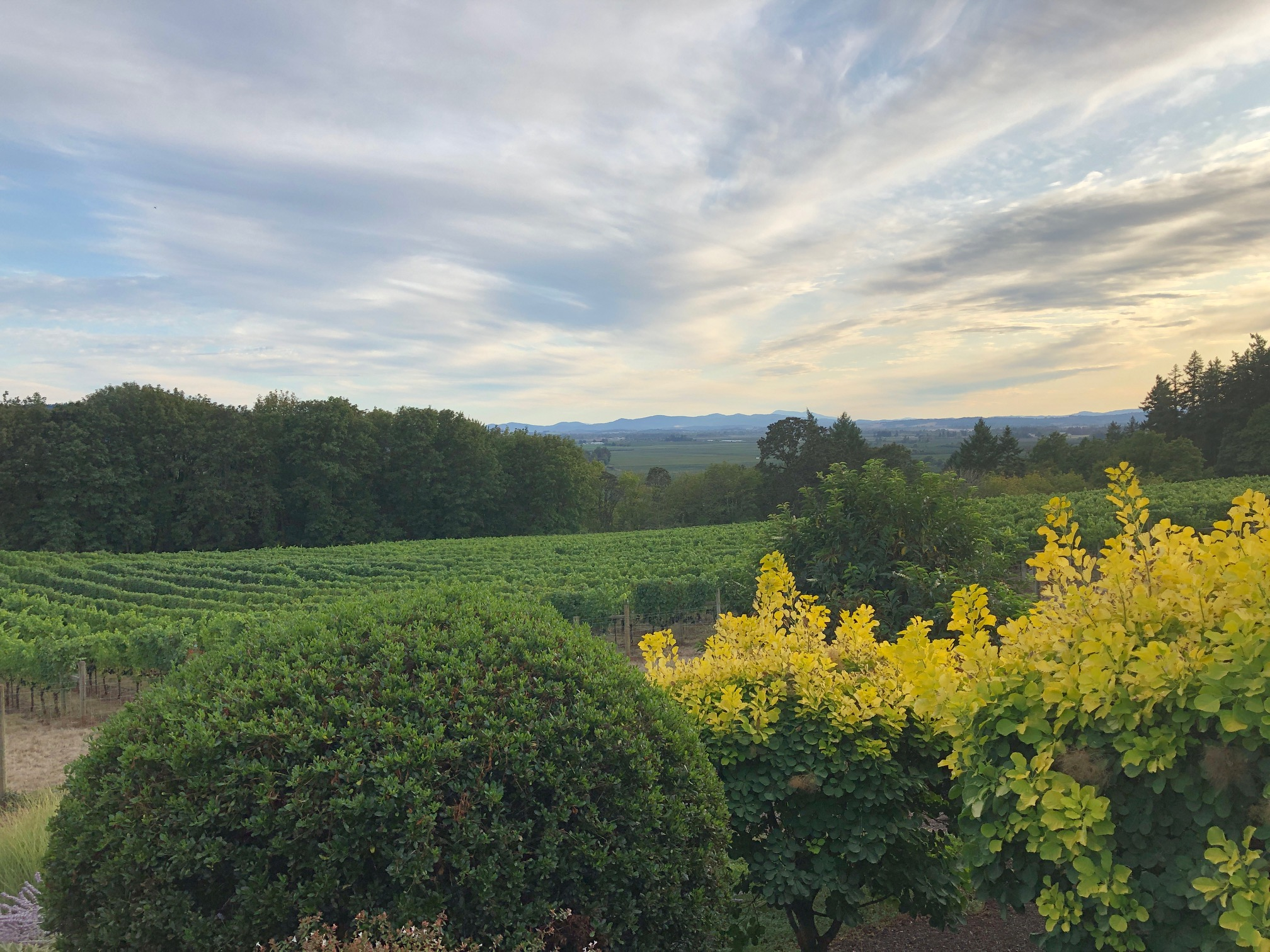
Working vineyard at Northwest Wine Studies Program at Chemeketa Eola

Chemeketa Community College (CCC) is a public community college in Salem, Oregon, with a campus in McMinnville, and education centers in Dallas, Brooks, and Woodburn. In addition, the college has a Center for Business and Industry in downtown Salem that houses the Small Business Development Center. It operates classes and programs benefiting area businesses.

Chemeketa employs over 1,100 people and serves nearly 30,000 students each year in a district that covers 2,600 square miles (6,700 km^{2}) in Marion, Polk, most of Yamhill, and part of Linn counties.

== History ==
Chemeketa's history began in 1952, when the Salem School District (now Salem-Keizer School District) started the Salem Technical-Vocational School to provide training for unemployed people. It offered two programs, Nursing and Electronics, which took place in the school at the corner of 3rd and Gerth St. NW. In 1957, student records were lost in a fire at the district office.

In 1969 the college district was formed, and a competition was held to name the new college. The winning entry came from student Susan Blum, whose submission said that the term "Chemeketa" means "a peaceful gathering place" in the language of the regional Kalapuya tribe. In December 1969, the Board of Education approved the name Chemeketa Community College. Property was purchased near Lancaster Street, and current Building 22 was constructed as the first official building. Chemeketa officially began operating on July 1, 1970.

The Chemeketa Cooperative Regional Library Service began on the Chemeketa campus on July 1, 1974.

In the 1990s, Chemeketa was part of the Beacon Colleges Initiative of the American Association of Community and Junior Colleges, a group of projects intended to identify ways to better support students at community colleges.

In 2005, the college asked the Confederated Tribes of the Grand Ronde and the Confederated Tribes of Siletz for permission to continue using the name Chemeketa. Both tribes approved the request, and on May 6 there was a naming ceremony attended by members of both groups, followed by an official public announcement of the name.

== Academics and facilities ==
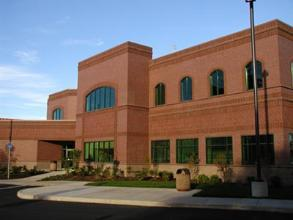
Exterior of Chemeketa's Woodburn Center

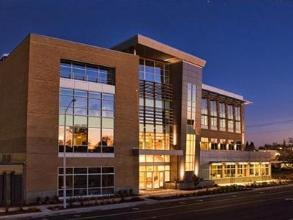
Exterior of Chemeketa's Center for Business and Industry

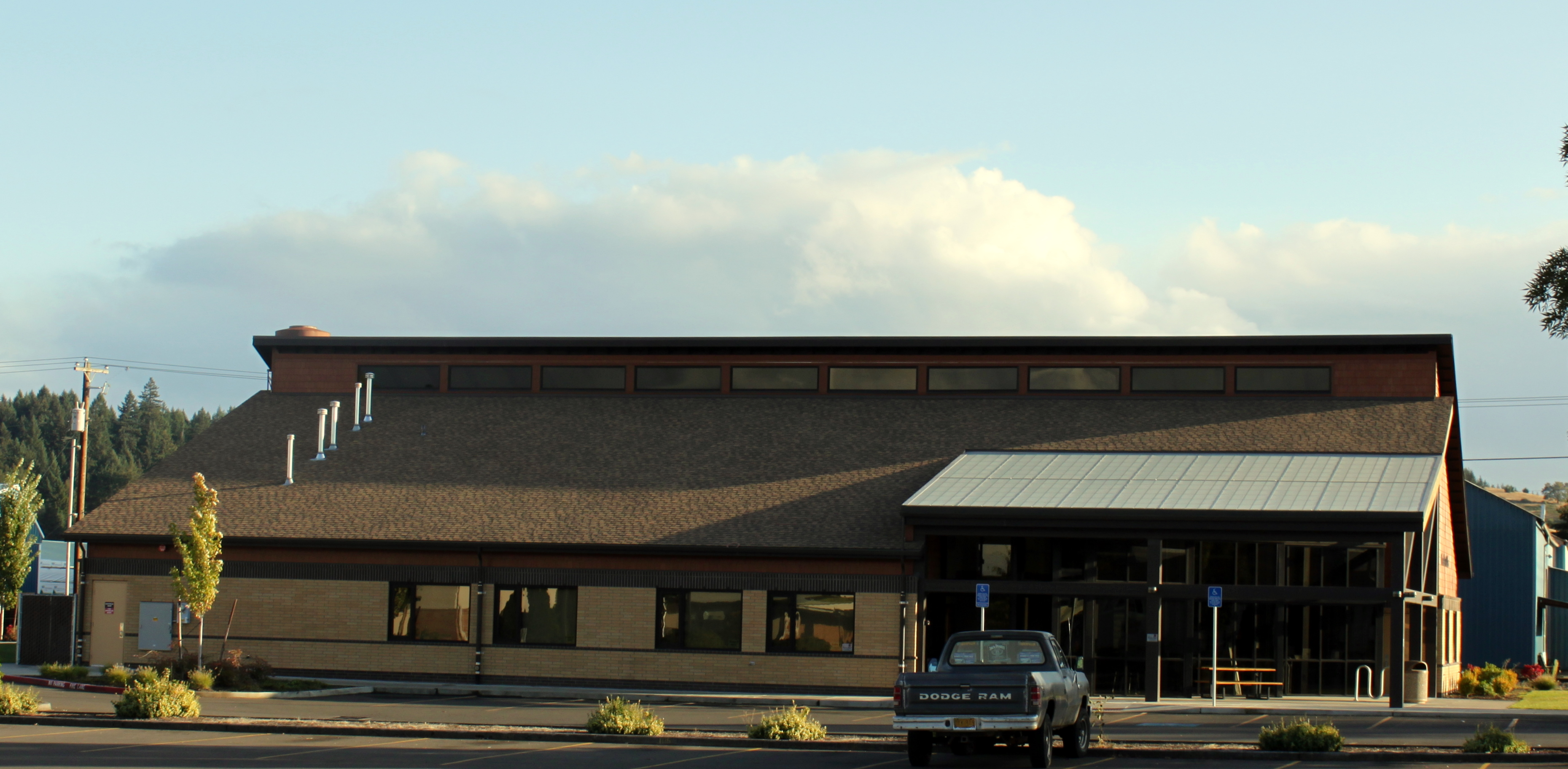
Dallas campus, 2009

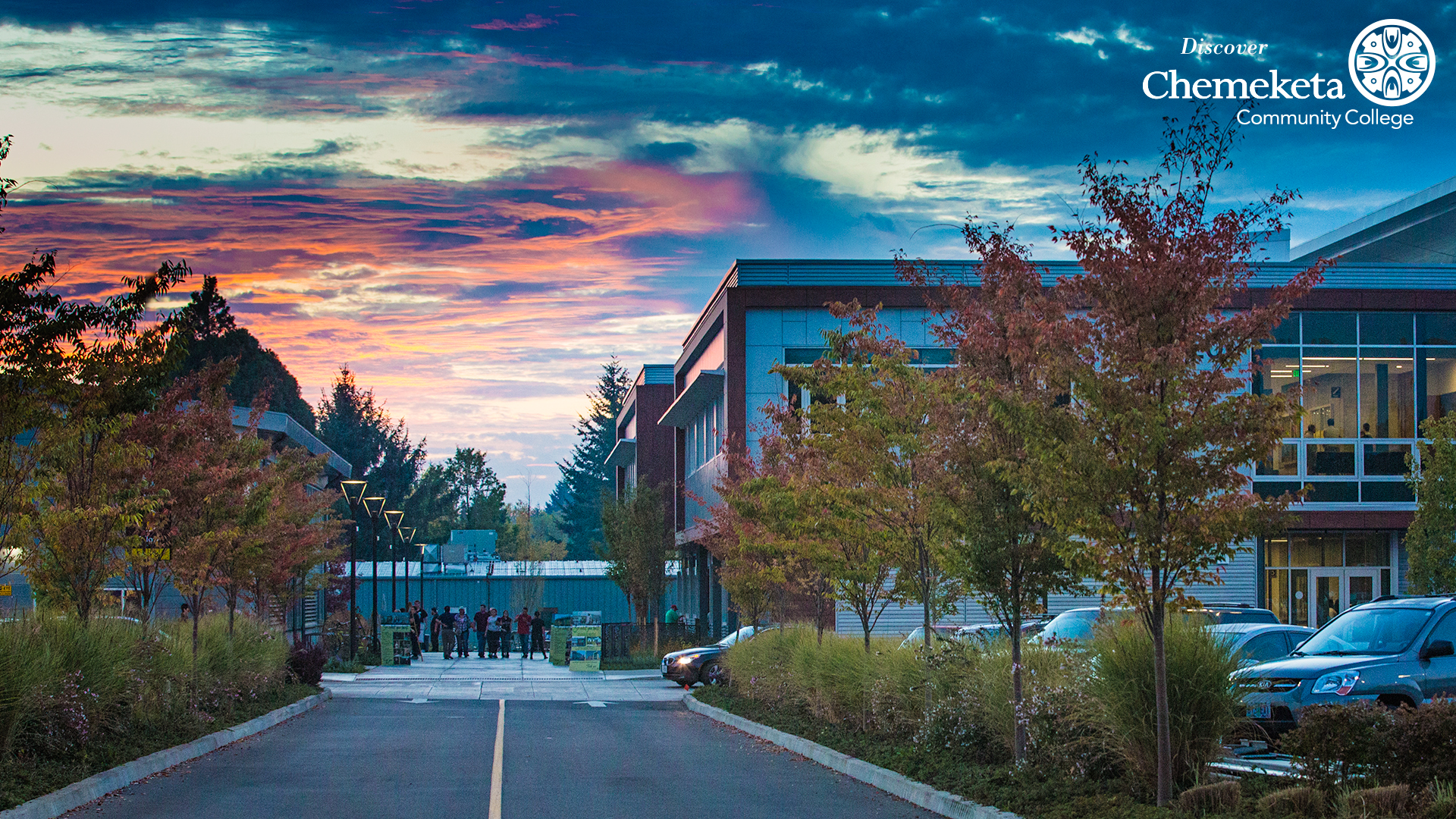
Salem Campus, 2015

Chemeketa employs about 1,112 people as of 2024–2025.

The college offers Associate of Applied Science degrees and certificates in more than 90 professional-technical programs, as well as Associate of Arts Oregon Transfer Degrees, Associate of Applied Science, Associate of Science, Associate of Science - Oregon Transfer Business, Associate of Science - Oregon Transfer Computer Science, and Associate of General Studies degrees.

The Chemeketa Cooperative Regional Library Service offices are located at the Salem campus.

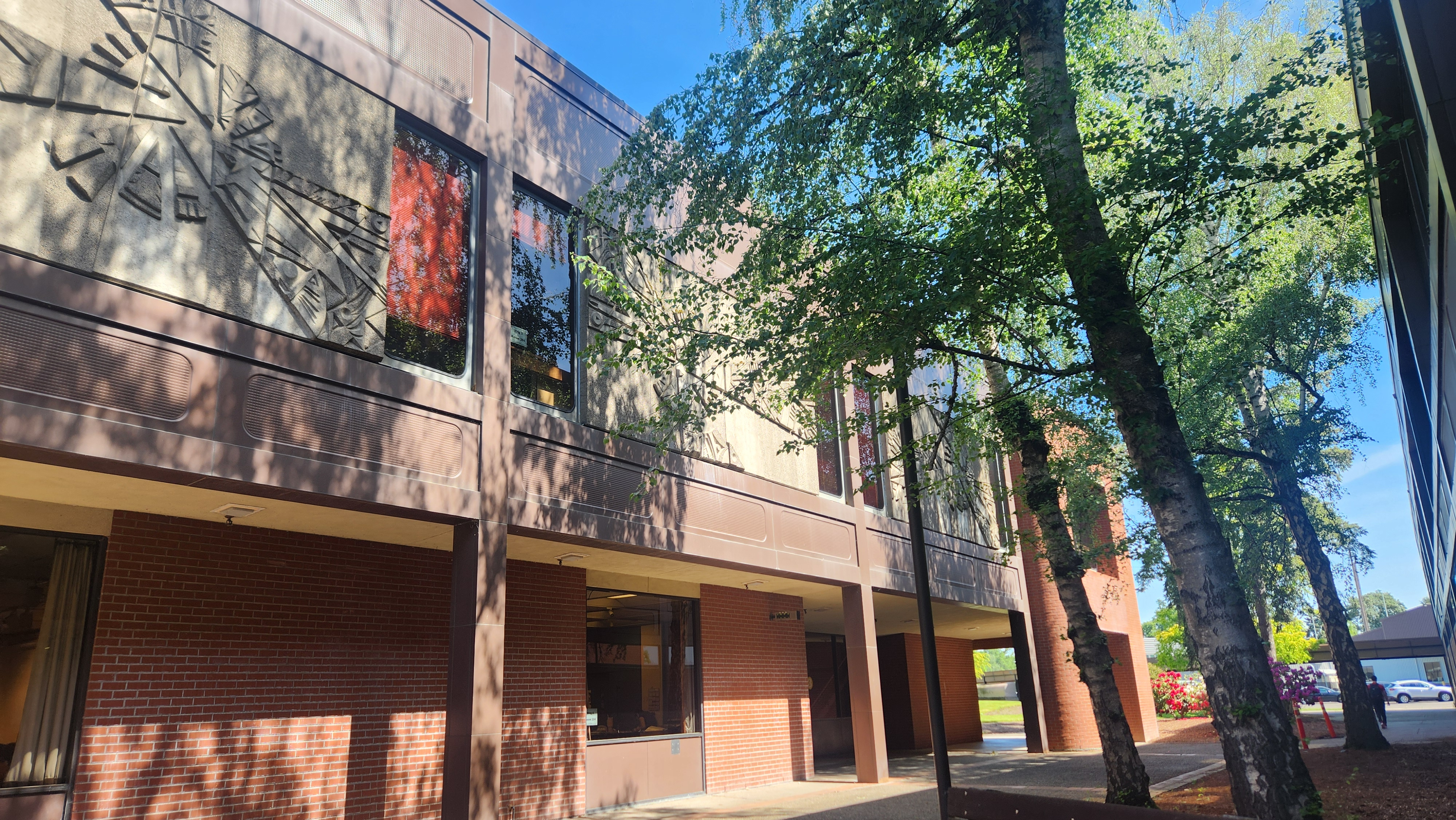
Building 3 (pictured) houses the Gretchen Schuette Art Gallery.

The Gretchen Schuette Art Gallery is located on the Salem campus. It was named after former Chemeketa president Gretchen Schuette, who donated to the college to "create a sustaining foundation for the arts." The gallery has several shows per year, and frequently holds shows for the artwork of students or faculty and staff.

Chemeketa's sports teams use the name "Chemeketa Storm." The Salem campus has a baseball field which has been used as a home field by locally-based teams, including the Salem Senators and the Marion Berries. The Salem Sabres have also played their home games at Chemeketa.

The campus in Eola, near West Salem, houses the Northwest Wine Studies Center. Opened in 2003, the Center is the site of the college's winemaking and vineyard management programs and includes a working vineyard. This program was the first of its kind in Oregon and was developed because of the growth of the Willamette Valley as a center of wine industry. The Northwest Wine Studies Center is located in the Eola-Amity Hills AVA, a sub-region of the Willamette Valley AVA.

== Faculty, staff, and administration ==
Chemeketa's first president was Paul F. Wilmeth, who came into the position on October 23, 1969. Wilmeth died on March 24, 1974, and Albion "Al" Ringo was the interim president from March 25 until July 1, when Donald L. Newport was appointed president. Arthur Binnie was president of the college until he resigned in April 1983. William E. Segura was named interim president and stayed in the position until July 1993, when he left to become president of Austin Community College. Gerard I. Berger became the interim president and was then named president that August. Gretchen Schuette was president from July 16, 2001 to August 20, 2007, when Cheryl Roberts became president. Roberts left in June 2014 to become president of Shoreline Community College, at which point Julie Huckstein became the interim president. Huckstein would remain in the position until her retirement on June 30, 2018.

Jessica Howard, the current president, has been in the position since July 8, 2019.

== Notable people ==
=== Faculty and staff ===
- Rick Adelman (1946-2026) coached basketball from 1977 until 1983, when he left to be assistant coach of the Portland Trail Blazers.
- Vicki Berger (born 1949) taught racquetball in the early 1980s.
- Kevin Bromley (born 1959) was an assistant coach of men's basketball from 1987–1989, then left to coach at California State Polytechnic University, Pomona, Southern Utah University, and then the Cal Poly Mustangs.
- Oregon House Representative Paul Evans (born 1970) has worked as a speech communication professor at Chemeketa since 2013.
- Asao B. Inoue (born 1970) taught English at Chemeketa from 1998–2001.
- Burt Kanner (born 1939) taught part-time at Chemeketa after 2006.
- Chemical and civil engineer William Tebeau (1925–2013) taught at Chemeketa and was named teacher of the year in 1970.

=== Alumni ===
- Ryan Bailey (born 1989), track and field sprinter, went to Chemeketa before transferring to Rend Lake College in Illinois.
- Austin M. Bibens-Dirkx (born 1985), pitcher for the Texas Rangers, pitched two seasons at Chemeketa before 2006.
- Grayson "The Professor" Boucher (born 1984), professional streetball basketball player
- Jim Bunn (born 1956), Oregon politician and correctional officer
- Andrew David Edwards (born 1958), serial killer
- Doc Haskell, Head Coach of Esports at Boise State University
- Russell Johnston, Timber Management Specialist
- Shane McCrae (born 1975), poet
- Andy Olson (born 1952), politician; former member of Oregon House of Representatives
- Rashaad Powell (born 1981), professional basketball player and coach
- Zac Rosscup (born 1988), Major League Baseball player
- Ryan Thompson (born 1992), professional baseball player

== See also ==
- History of education in the United States
- List of colleges and universities in Oregon
- List of smoke-free colleges and universities
