= Power Esports Conference =

Collegiate esports scheduling alliance

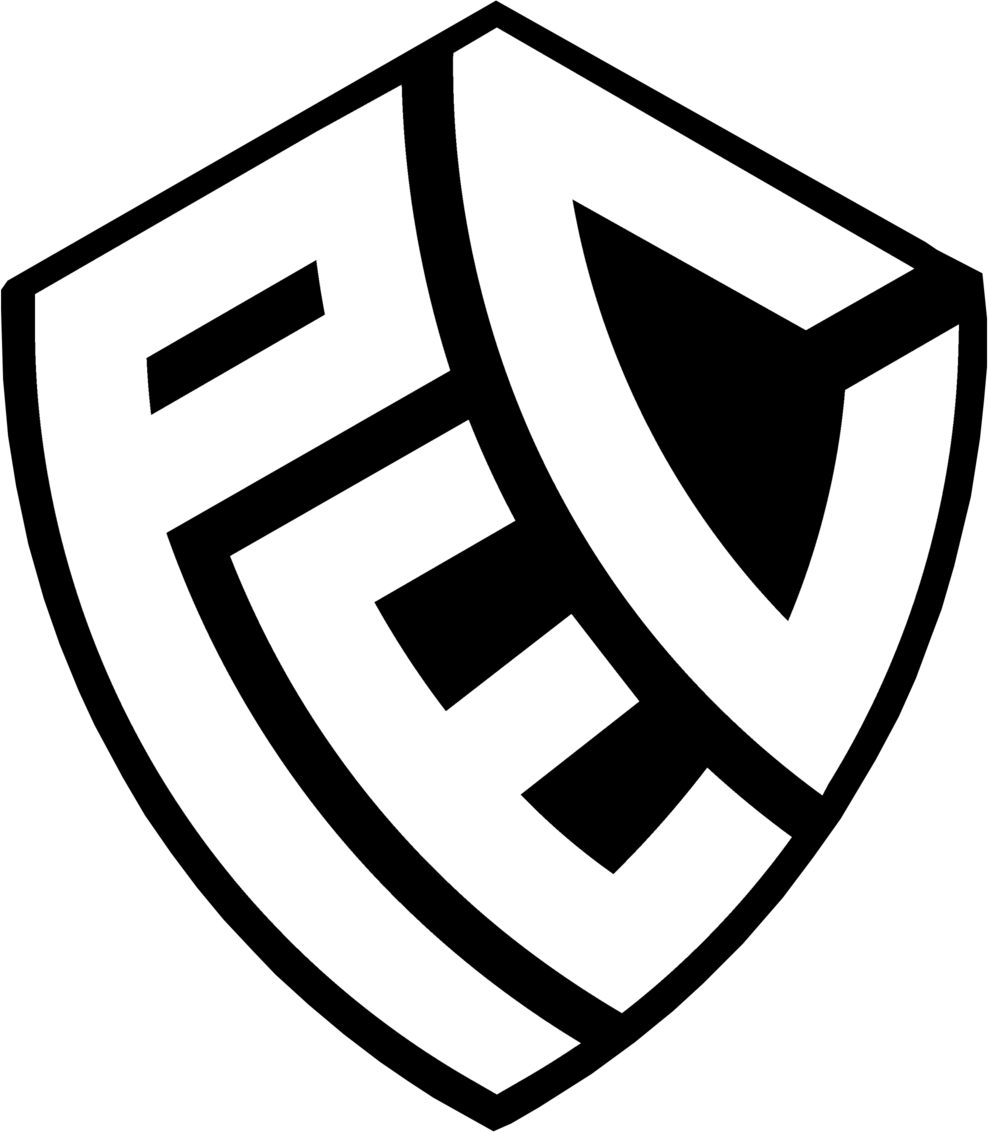
- Abbreviation: PEC
- Formation: 2024
- Website: pec.leagueos.gg

The Power Esports Conference (PEC) is a collegiate esports scheduling alliance comprising nine NCAA Division I FBS universities. The conference organizes regular-season competition, shared rulesets, and a centralized postseason culminating in a double-elimination championship event at the HyperX Esports Arena in Las Vegas.

Current members include Boise State, Syracuse, Michigan State, Ohio State, Kansas, Nebraska, Baylor, Minnesota, and Utah. Oklahoma and USC are former members.

== History ==
=== Formation (2024) ===
The Power Esports Conference was publicly announced in August 2024, with founding institutions unveiling coordinated statements through social media and university websites. The inaugural membership featured:

- Boise State University
- Syracuse University
- Michigan State University
- Ohio State University
- University of Kansas
- University of Nebraska
- University of Oklahoma
- University of Southern California

The conference also confirmed that its first national championship would take place at the HyperX Esports Arena in Las Vegas. Supported titles in the inaugural season included Overwatch 2, VALORANT, Rocket League, and Super Smash Bros. Ultimate.

=== Expansion (2025) ===
Ahead of the 2025–26 season, Oklahoma and USC withdrew from the league. In August 2025, the PEC announced the addition of Baylor University, the University of Minnesota, and the University of Utah, bringing membership to nine teams.

In the 2026-27 season, Washington and West Virginia joined, bringing league membership to 11 total teams. The addition of the two schools also prompted the conference to adapt a division format.

== Membership ==
Institution	Location	Joined	Left	Notes
Syracuse University	Syracuse, New York	2024	—	Founding member
Michigan State University	East Lansing, Michigan	2024	—	Founding member
Boise State University	Boise, Idaho	2024	—	Founding member
Ohio State University	Columbus, Ohio	2024	—	Founding member
University of Kansas	Lawrence, Kansas	2024	—	Founding member
University of Nebraska	Lincoln, Nebraska	2024	—	Founding member
Baylor University	Waco, Texas	2025	—	Added for 2025–26 season
University of Minnesota	Minneapolis, Minnesota	2025	—	Added for 2025–26 season
University of Utah	Salt Lake City, Utah	2025	—	Added for 2025–26 season
University of Oklahoma	Norman, Oklahoma	2024	2025	Withdrew before 2025–26 season
University of Southern California	Los Angeles, California	2024	2025	Withdrew before 2025–26 season
University of Washington	Seattle, Washington	2026	—	Added for 2026-27 season
West Virginia University	Morgantown, West Virginia	2026	—	Added for 2026-27 season

== Sponsored titles ==
Title	Publisher	First season sponsored
Overwatch 2	Blizzard Entertainment	2024–25
VALORANT	Riot Games	2024–25
Rocket League	Psyonix	2024–25
Super Smash Bros. Ultimate	Nintendo	2024–25

== Format ==
=== Regular season ===
In 2026, the PEC adopted a divisional format and shortened the season to align with a more traditional athletic schedule. The PEC West and PEC East divisions send their top four teams in each game to the championship in Las Vegas. In 2026-27, the divisions were split, with five teams in the west and six in the east.

West	East
Washington	Syracuse
Utah	West Virginia
Boise State	Ohio State
Baylor	Nebraska
Kansas	Michigan State
N/A	Minnesota

=== Postseason ===
The top four teams in each division for each game qualify for the PEC National Championship in Las Vegas. The event uses a double-elimination LAN format, with match operations administered by the conference in partnership with LeagueOS.

=== Awards ===
The PEC gives out First and Second Team All Conference Teams, as well as All Americans.

== Season summaries ==
=== 2024–25 season ===
The inaugural season produced four championship matchups across the supported titles. Boise State and Michigan State each secured two national championships:

- Boise State – Rocket League, Overwatch 2
- Michigan State – Super Smash Bros. Ultimate, VALORANT

Syracuse reached the Overwatch 2 grand finals, while Nebraska finished runner-up in Super Smash Bros. Ultimate.

National Champions
Season	Game title	Champion	Runner-up	Location
2024–25	Overwatch 2	Boise State	Syracuse	Las Vegas, Nevada (HyperX Esports Arena)
2024–25	Rocket League	Boise State	Michigan State	Las Vegas, Nevada (HyperX Esports Arena)
2024–25	VALORANT	Michigan State	Boise State	Las Vegas, Nevada (HyperX Esports Arena)
2024–25	Super Smash Bros. Ultimate	Michigan State	Nebraska	Las Vegas, Nevada (HyperX Esports Arena)

Post Season Awards
Award	Winner
Director of the Year	Joey Gawrysiak, Syracuse
Program of the Year	Michigan State
Rocket League Coach of the Year	Payton Wilkin, Boise State
Valorant Coach of the Year	Alexander Mills, Michigan State
Overwatch Coach of the Year	Doc Haskell, Boise State
Super Smash Bros Coach of the Year	Grayson Harding, Michigan State
Rocket League Player of the Year	Cade Hall, Boise State
Valorant Player of the Year	Maxwell Humes, Michigan State
Overwatch Player of the Year	Johnathan Foraker, Boise State
Super Smash Bros Player of the Year	Adam Ismaili-Alaoui, Michigan State

=== 2025–26 season ===
The 2025–26 season introduced the PEC Kickoff Classic presented by Spectrum Industries, held on 20 September 2025 at the Syracuse Esports Arena. The Rocket League invitational featured four programs, with Boise State defeating Michigan State in the championship match.

The PEC also launched its first official website, pec.leagueos.gg, built and hosted by LeagueOS and updated jointly by the member institutions.

In 2025/26, the PEC adopted a full season results format, meaning results from both fall and spring determined regular season champions, as well as seed order at the PEC National Championship in Las Vegas, Nevada.

The PEC Named First and Second Teams for all four games played, as well as overall All-Americans for 2026. These were nominated by and voted on by the directors.

Regular Season Champions
Title	Champion
Overwatch 2	Ohio State
Rocket League	Baylor
Valorant	Boise State
Super Smash Bros. Ultimate	Michigan State

National Champions
Title	Champion	Runner Up	Location
Overwatch 2	Utah	Boise State	Las Vegas, Nevada (HyperX Esports Arena)
Rocket League	Baylor	Boise State	Las Vegas, Nevada (HyperX Esports Arena)
Valorant	Boise State	Ohio State	Las Vegas, Nevada (HyperX Esports Arena)
Super Smash Bros. Ultimate	Michigan State	Minnesota	Las Vegas, Nevada (HyperX Esports Arena)

Post Season Awards
Award	Winner
Director of the Year	AJ Dimick
Program of the Year	Boise State
Rocket League Coach of the Year	James Jordan, Michigan State
Valorant Coach of the Year	Kelsey Moser, Boise State
Overwatch Coach of the Year	Jeehoon Yoo, Syracuse
Super Smash Bros Coach of the Year	Javier Sierra, Michigan State

Two new innovative pieces of media were produced during the 2025/26 season: PEC Match Point and PEC Splitscreen.

Match Point was produced by Boise State Esports in collaboration with the Idaho Air National Guard, and was hosted by local radio personality Michael Fisher. The show ran during the first and second semester, and showcased all matchups from around the league from the previous week, as well as previewed upcoming matchups.

Splitscreen was produced by Syracuse Esports, and provided coverage of all Rocket League matches simultaneously during the second semester.

== Branding ==
The conference's official colors are blue (#0047ab) and white (#FFFFFF). Its official abbreviation is PEC. The league's shield-style logo is used across broadcast, social media, and website branding.

== See also ==
- Esports
