= Doc Haskell =

American esports coach

Chris "Doc" Haskell
Current position
- Title: Head Coach
- Team: Boise State
- Conference: Mountain West; Power Esports Conference
- Record: 1652-726

Biographical details
- Born: San Rafael, California
- Education: Boise State University

Coaching career (HC unless noted)
- 9: Boise State

Accomplishments and honors

Championships
- PlayVS Overwatch National Championship (2020); NACE Overwatch National Championship (2021); NACE Madden National Championship (2021); PlayVS Madden National Championship (2021); PEC Overwatch 2 National Championship (2025); PEC Rocket League National Championship (2025); PEC Valorant National Champion (2026)

Awards
- Overwatch Coach of the Year, Mountain West (2026); Overwatch 2 Coach of the Year, Mountain West (2025); Overwatch 2 Coach of the Year, PEC (2025); Best College Esports Director, CECC (2022); Collegiate Ambassador of the Year, Esports Awards (2021); College Esports Coach of the Year, National Association of Esports Coaches and Directors (2020); College Esports Coach of the Year, National Association of Collegiate Esports (2020)

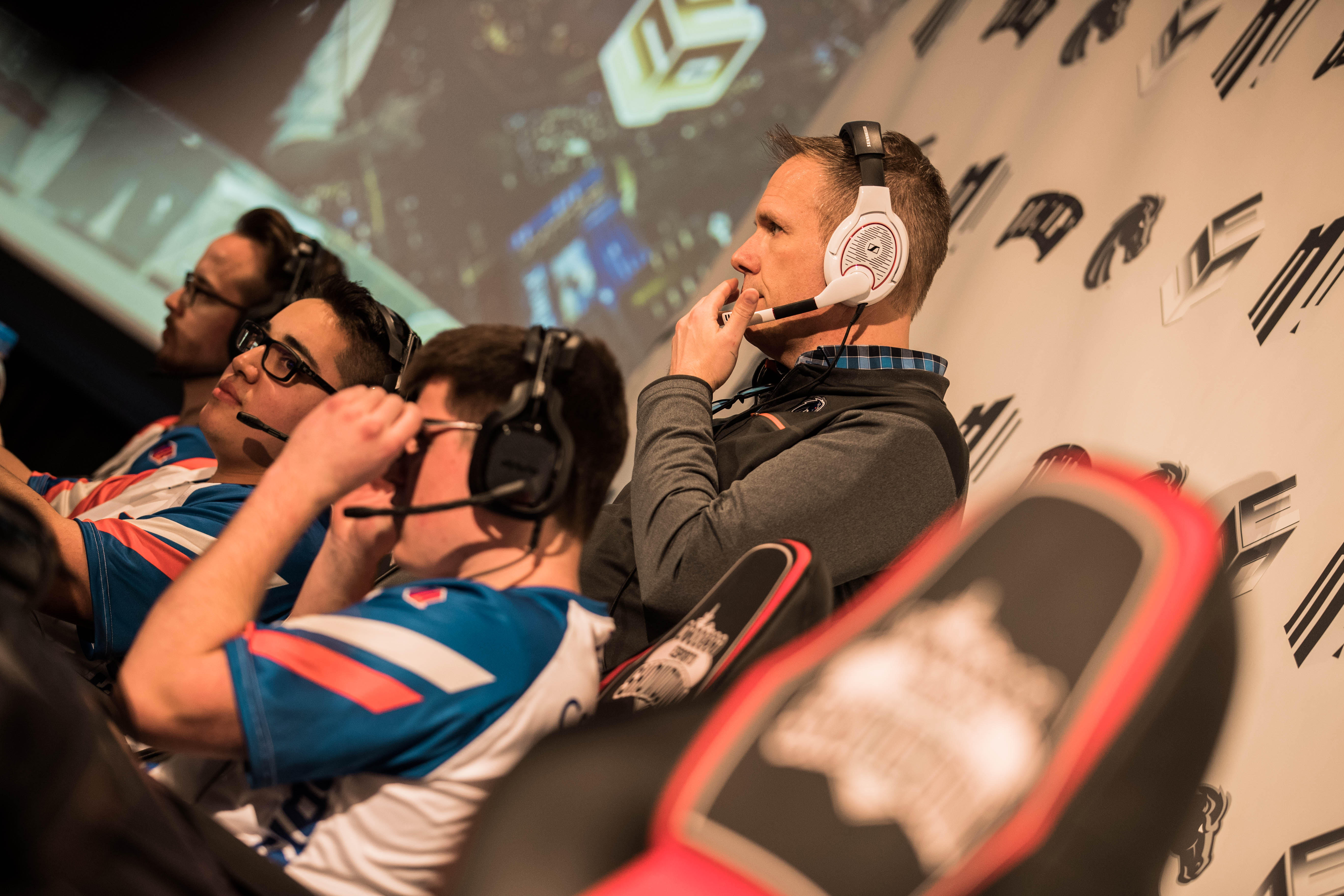
Haskell coaching at the Mountain West Championship in 2018

Charles Christopher Haskell, commonly known as Doc Haskell, is an American college esports coach and researcher He serves as the head coach of the esports program at Boise State University.

== Early life and education ==
Haskell graduated from Sam Barlow High School in 1989. After attending Chemeketa Community College, he transferred to Boise State University in 1990. Haskell earned a Bachelor of Music degree in 2000, a master’s in educational technology in 2007, and a Doctorate in Curriculum and Instruction in 2012.

== Coaching career ==
Doc Haskell joined Boise State’s faculty in 2007 in the College of Education. He was named head coach of Boise State Esports in 2017, leading one of the first esports programs at an FBS school.

Year	Team	Wins	Losses
2017-18	Boise State University	35	43
2018-19	Boise State University	125	77
2019-20	Boise State University	169	111
2020-21	Boise State University	221	111
2021-22	Boise State University	353	109
2022-23	Boise State University	232	87
2023-24	Boise State University	208	53
2024-25	Boise State University	160	65
2025-26	Boise State University	149	70

== Awards and honors ==
- Overwatch Coach of the Year, Mountain West (2026)
- Overwatch 2 Coach of the Year, Mountain West (2025)
- Overwatch 2 Coach of the Year, PEC (2025)
- Finalist, Director of the Year, Collegiate Esports Awards (2024)
- Best College Esports Director, CECC (2022) * Collegiate Ambassador of the Year, Esports Awards (2021)
- College Esports Coach of the Year, National Association of Esports Coaches and Directors (2020) * Collegiate Director of the Year, National Association of Collegiate Esports (2020)
- iNacol Online Learning Innovator Award (2013)
- Innovation Incubator Award Finalist, SIIA EdTech Industry Summit (2012)
- Competition Winner, DML Badges for Lifelong Learning (2012)
- Technology Educator of the Year Nominee, Northwest Council for Computers in Education (2010, 2013)

== Personal life ==
Haskell and his wife, Ali, live in Boise and have been married for 32 years. They met in Boise State cheerleading, where Doc was Buster Bronco (the Boise State mascot) and Ali was a cheerleader. They have four children, and four grandchildren. Haskell is an avid cyclist.
