= Ardie McInelly =

American basketball coach (born 1959)

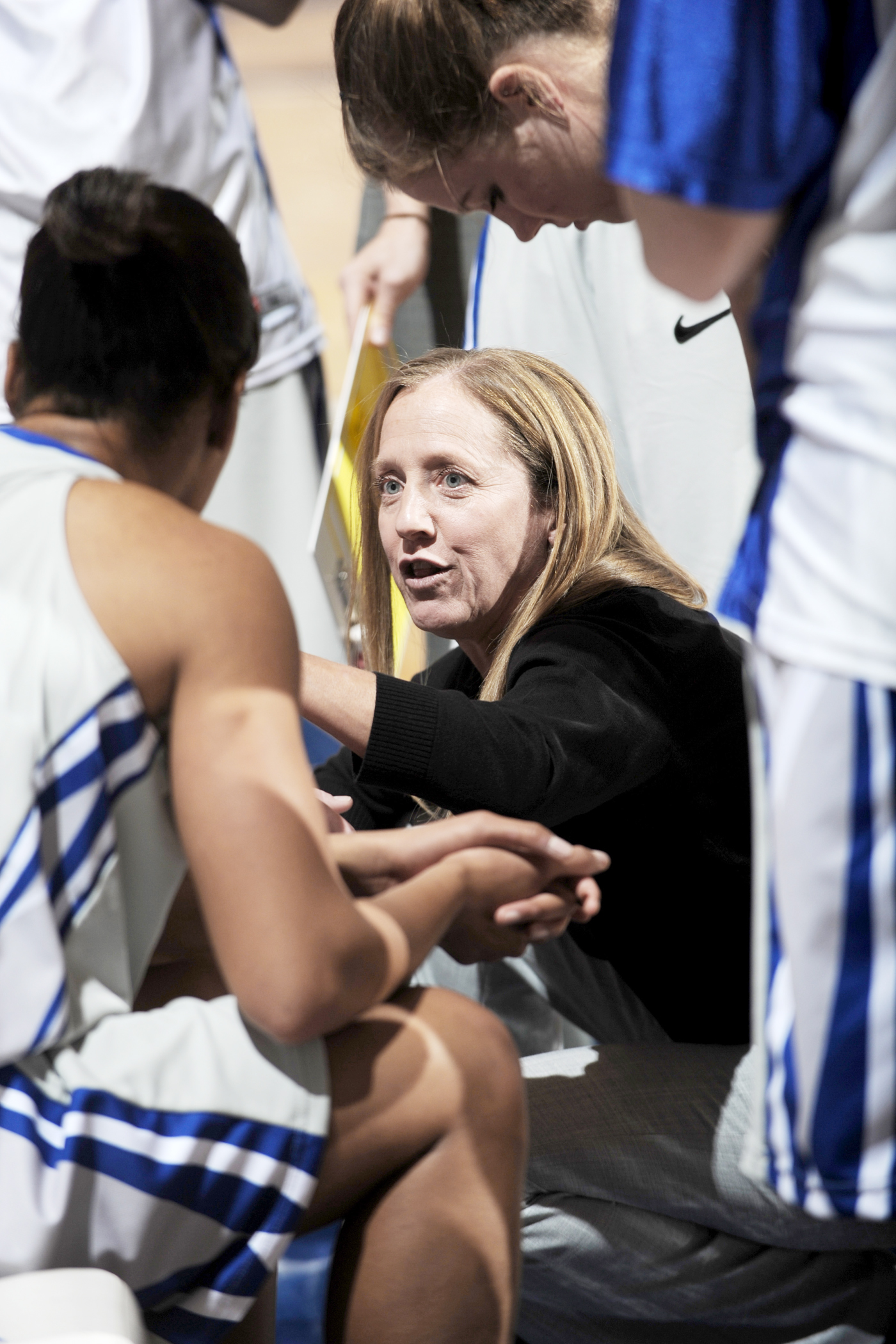
- McInelly in 2009

Biographical details
- Born: September 2, 1959 (age 67); Mackay, Idaho, U.S.

Playing career
- 1977–1981: Boise State

Coaching career (HC unless noted)
- 1988–1991: Montana State (asst.)
- 1991–1992: Pacific (asst.)
- 1992–1996: Weber State (asst.)
- 1996–2001: Idaho State
- 2001–2010: Air Force
- 2013–2016: Harrison HS

Head coaching record
- Overall: 134–263 (.338) (college)
- Tournaments: 0–1 (NCAA)

Accomplishments and honors

Championships
- Big Sky tournament (2000); Big Sky regular season (2000)

Awards
- 2× Big Sky Coach of the Year (1999, 2000)

Ardena Frances "Ardie" McInelly (born September 2, 1959) is an American basketball coach. McInelly was the head women's basketball coach at Idaho State from 1996 to 2001 and Air Force from 2001 to 2010.

== Early life and education ==
McInelly was born and raised in Mackay, Idaho and graduated from Mackay High School in 1977. McInelly only began playing organized basketball as a junior in high school when her high school first formed a girls' varsity team. At Mackay High, McInelly helped the Miners girls' basketball team finish in third place in the Idaho A-4 tournament in 1977.

At Boise State University, McInelly played for the Boise State Broncos from 1977 to 1981. McInelly graduated from Boise State in 1982 with a bachelor's degree in physical education and later completed a master's degree in education from Weber State University in 1995.

== Coaching career ==
McInelly started as a teacher and girls' basketball coach at Firth High School in Firth, Idaho and Skyline High School in Idaho Falls, Idaho. McInelly moved up to the college level, first as an assistant coach at Montana State from 1988 to 1991, Pacific from 1991 to 1992, and Weber State from 1992 to 1996.

From 1996 to 2001, McInelly was head coach at Idaho State University, where she posted a 77–62 record. Her 2000 team went 25–5, the best season in school history. The 2000 team went 18–0 in conference play, and won the league title outright. That helped them make it to the NCAA tournament, where they were eventually eliminated by Vanderbilt. Idaho State finished third or higher in the Big Sky Conference in all five of her seasons there. She earned back-to-back coach of the year honors in the Big Sky Conference during her final two seasons.

McInelly then coached at the U.S. Air Force Academy from 2001 to 2010. McInelly went 57–201 in nine seasons, with her best season being in 2005–06 with a 13–15 record (4–12 in Mountain West Conference games), also Air Force's most wins since moving up from Division II to Division I in the 1996–97 season. However, two starting players left the program after the season. She was fired by the Academy on March 29, 2010, with two years remaining on her contract.

In 2013, McInelly became head coach of the Harrison High School girls basketball team in Colorado Springs. McInelly retired after the 2015–16 school year and 30–40 overall record.

== Head coaching record ==
Record table
Season	Team	Overall	Conference	Standing	Postseason
Idaho State Bengals (Big Sky Conference) (1996–2001)
1996–97	Idaho State	15–12	11–5	T–2nd	
1997–98	Idaho State	15–12	9–7	T–3rd	
1998–99	Idaho State	8–18	6–10	7th	
1999–2000	Idaho State	14–15	11–5	T–2nd	
2000–01	Idaho State	25–5	16–0	1st	NCAA First Round
Idaho State:		77–62 (.554)	55–37 (.598)		
Air Force Falcons (Mountain West Conference) (2001–2010)
2001–02	Air Force	4–24	0–14	8th	
2002–03	Air Force	7–21	1–13	8th	
2003–04	Air Force	4–24	1–14	8th	
2004–05	Air Force	7–21	2–12	T–7th	
2005–06	Air Force	13–15	4–12	7th	
2006–07	Air Force	6–23	1–15	9th	
2007–08	Air Force	10–19	4–12	T–7th	
2008–09	Air Force	4–26	0–16	9th	
2009–10	Air Force	3–27	0–16	9th	
Air Force:		57–201 (.221)	12–124 (.088)		
Total:		134–263 (.338)			
National champion Postseason invitational champion Conference regular season champion Conference regular season and conference tournament champion Division regular season champion Division regular season and conference tournament champion Conference tournament champion
