= Andrew David Edwards =

American serial killer

- Born: March 6, 1958 (age 68); Sunnyvale, California, U.S.
- Conviction: Murder (2 counts)
- Penalty: Life imprisonment

Details
- Victims: 4
- Span of crimes: 1987–1992
- Country: United States
- States: Oregon; California; Colorado
- Date apprehended: January 26, 1993
- Imprisoned at: Eastern Oregon Correctional Institution, Pendleton, Oregon

Andrew David Edwards (born March 6, 1958) is an American serial killer. A jobless drifter, Edwards murdered four fellow itinerants across three states between 1987 and 1992 in alcohol-induced rages, and attempted to murder a fifth in 1993. Following his last attack, he was arrested and subsequently confessed to the murders, receiving a sentence of life imprisonment for his crimes.

== Early life ==
Little is known about Edwards' upbringing. A native of Sunnyvale, California, he attended the Fremont High School and later the Chemeketa Community College in Salem, Oregon. He had a girlfriend and held a job as a bricklayer, but was an alcoholic who had been in and out of treatment centers since the age of 19. In 1985, he abandoned his girlfriend and his job, deciding to live a transient lifestyle. During this time, he began to kill his fellow drinking companions.

== Murders ==
On October 5, 1987, Edwards was drinking with 37-year-old John Harold Schiermeister, a transient from Roseburg, Oregon, at a railway yard in Portland. Enraged by alcohol, he proceeded to beat Schiermeister to death, fatally injuring him with a blow to the head. The following day, his body was found by railroad workers in one of the yards of the Burlington Northern Railroad. Two days later, Schiermeister was identified, but his killer remained elusive.

On April 5, 1990, Edwards killed 24-year-old Anthony Keith Thurman by beating his head in with a pipe, before dumping the corpse under a freeway overpass in Portland. His body was discovered later that same month.

Two years later, Edwards met 52-year-old Melvin Richards while riding the rails and the two men shared a drink. During their drinking session, Edwards became enraged and brutally beat Richards to death. He then threw the body off the train near Bakersfield, California on February 21, 1992.

Approximately two months later, in either April or May, Andrew found himself at a homeless shelter based in Pueblo, Colorado train yard, where he encountered 48-year-old Bud Griffith. The two drank together, and as in the previous cases, Edwards attacked Griffith, beating him to death with a 2x4 wood board and a wine bottle. His death went unreported for several days.

== Arrest, capture and imprisonment ==
In January 1993, Edwards nearly murdered a fifth victim in San Jose, California, attacking 42-year-old Lynn Ellis Delong with a wrench behind a bowling alley. After the attack, he decided to seek help, breaking the rails of the train he was riding on and hopping onto another one, bound for Chico. On January 26, while seeking medical treatment for his injured hand in Oroville, Edwards was picked up by a deputy while wandering through a residential area. He admitted to the deputy that he had killed five men, unaware that, although he had lost an ear, Delong had survived their encounter.

Edwards later claimed to have regretted this decision, as he claimed that his parents would be embarrassed by him. He was sentenced to life imprisonment for the murders of Schiermeister and Thurman in Oregon, and was sent to the Eastern Oregon Correctional Institution, where he still resided as of 2020. He has accounts on several websites dedicated to finding pen pals for prisoners. His earliest release date is February 14, 2052, when he is 93 years old.

== See also ==
- List of serial killers in the United States
