= Terry Dunn =

American basketball coach (born 1953)

Biographical details
- Born: May 6, 1953 (age 73)

Playing career
- 1974–1977: Northern Colorado

Coaching career (HC unless noted)
- 1982–1990: Harrison HS
- 1990–1991: Army (assistant)
- 1991–1994: Air Force (assistant)
- 1994–1996: Colorado State (assistant)
- 1996–2004: Colorado (assistant)
- 2004–2010: Dartmouth

Head coaching record
- Overall: 47–104 (college)

Terry Dunn (born May 6, 1953) was the head men's basketball coach at Dartmouth College from 2004 through January 9, 2010, when he resigned his position.

== Head coaching record ==
=== College ===
Record table
Season	Team	Overall	Conference	Standing	Postseason
Dartmouth (Ivy League) (2005–2010)
2004–05	Dartmouth	10–17	7–7	T–3rd	
2005–06	Dartmouth	6–21	4–10	T–7th	
2006–07	Dartmouth	9–18	4–10	7th	
2007–08	Dartmouth	10–18	3–11	T–6th	
2008–09	Dartmouth	9–19	7–7	T–4th	
2009–10	Dartmouth	3–10	0–0	NA	
Dartmouth:		47–104	25–45		
Total:		47–104			
