= Harrison High School (Colorado) =

Public school in Colorado, United States

Location
- 2755 Janitell Road; Colorado Springs, Colorado 80906; United States; 38°47′36″N 104°47′35″W

Information
- Other names: Harrison, HHS
- Type: Public high school
- School district: Harrison 2
- CEEB code: 060285
- NCES School ID: 080453000667
- Principal: Peter Vargas
- Teaching staff: 51.03 (on an FTE basis)
- Grades: 9–12
- Enrollment: 1,143 (2023–2024)
- Student to teacher ratio: 22.40
- Colors: Black and white
- Mascot: Panther
- Website: hhs.hsd2.org

Harrison High School (HHS) is a public high school located near the junction of Interstate 25 and Circle Drive on the southwest side of Colorado Springs, Colorado. It serves a diverse student population and is one of two high schools within Harrison School District 2, a district known for its commitment to equity and educational opportunity. HHS is recognized as an International Baccalaureate (IB) World School, reflecting its dedication to academic rigor and global-minded learning. As of 2025, the school is in candidacy for offering both the IB Diploma Programme and the IB Career-related Certificate. In addition to its IB offerings, HHS provides dual enrollment opportunities through local colleges, including Pikes Peak State College. Despite limited AP course availability, the school encourages academic ambition through AVID, career and technical education programs, and a growing emphasis on postsecondary readiness.

== Notable people ==
=== Alumni ===
- Raquel Pennington (class of 2007), professional mixed martial arts fighter, competing in the UFC's bantamweight division
- Devonte Upson (born 1993), basketball player in the Israeli Basketball Premier League

=== Staff ===
- Terry Dunn, boys' basketball coach (1982–1990)
- Ardie McInelly, girls' basketball coach (2013–2016)

== Students ==
- Aidan Gallegos, a student at Harrison High School, has been recognized for his leadership and advocacy in education policy and student wellness. He serves as a Student Board Representative for Harrison School District Two, where he contributes to district-level decision-making and represents student perspectives on governance issues.

Gallegos is actively involved with the Colorado Association of School Boards (CASB), where he engages in statewide advocacy efforts focused on student voice and equity in education. He also serves on the National Youth Council of GENYOUth, a nonprofit dedicated to promoting student health, nutrition, and physical activity. His official GENYOUth biography reads: *“Aidan is a changemaker. With a drive for academic excellence and a 4.45 GPA, he balances top-tier scholarship with service as a student board representative and youth council leader. Aidan is committed to equity, student voice, and the well-being of his peers, spearheading initiatives that promote mental health, physical wellness, and inclusive dialogue. He envisions a future in public health, where he can architect systems that uplift marginalized communities and revolutionize youth engagement.”*

In addition to his policy and advocacy work, Gallegos is a varsity athlete in track and field, competing in events such as the 800-meter and 1600-meter runs for Harrison High School. His athletic profile also appears on [MileSplit Colorado](https://co.milesplit.com/athletes/12340757-aidan-gallegos) where his performance stats are tracked across multiple seasons.
