= Gretchen Schuette =

Academic leader in Oregon, U.S. (born 1946)

- Born: 1946 (age 79–80)
- Occupation: Academic leader
- Title: College president Community College Commissioner
- Awards: Oregon Women of Achievement

Academic background
- Education: B.A., Smith College; M.S., Central Michigan University; Ph.D., Oregon State University
- Thesis: Recent marine diatom taphocoenoses off Peru and off southwest Africa: reflection of coastal upwelling (1970)
- Doctoral advisor: Hans Schrader

Academic work
- Discipline: Oceanography

Gretchen Susan Schuette (born 1946) is an American academic who is President Emeritus of Chemeketa Community College in the U.S. state of Oregon. She has served at multiple levels of leadership at Linn–Benton Community College and Mt. Hood Community College, and in other roles in higher education: as director, dean and president, as superintendent, as member of the Oregon State Board of Higher Education, and as Oregon's commissioner of community colleges. She has been described as "one of the most highly regarded educators and administrators in the West".

== Early life and education ==
Gretchen Susan Schuette, the daughter of William and Esther Schuette, was born in 1946. Her father was vice president of Dow Chemical Company. Her family also included a sister and a brother; the family lived in Midland, Michigan. She earned a bachelor’s degree in English at Smith College in 1968 and a master’s degree in botany at Central Michigan University in 1975.

She earned a Ph.D. in Oceanography in 1980 at Oregon State University. Her dissertation, Recent marine diatom taphocoenoses off Peru and off southwest Africa: reflection of coastal upwelling, was supervised by Hans Schrader.

== Career ==
Schuette has been a faculty member and administrator at Linn–Benton, Mt. Hood, and Chemeketa Community College, and served as Oregon's commissioner of community colleges. She held positions as dean of distance and continuing education, as well as director of Portland area programs for Oregon State University, and she was superintendent of the Gresham-Barlow School District.

Following her degree at Oregon State, Schuette worked at Oregon State University's School of Oceanography as a research assistant and associate. She was hired from 1981 to 1988 at Linn–Benton Community College as an instructor, then humanities department head, and later as director of several other college departments. From 1988 to 1992, she was dean of humanities, sciences and learning assistance at Chemeketa Community College.

In 1992 she became executive vice president of Mt. Hood Community College, responsible for "instruction, student services, information services and community and economic development". She was appointed interim commissioner for community colleges and then was named special assistant to Oregon State University's provost for Portland area programs in 1996. Schuette was OSU’s first dean of distance and continuing education and director of Portland area programs.

From 2001 to 2007, Schuette served as president of Chemeketa Community College. According to Salem's Statesman Journal, Schuette was known to "pull wacky antics" at annual State of the College addresses, in 2003 rappelling from a roof.

She retired in 2007, and is President Emeritus of the college.

== Philanthropy ==
In 2008 Schuette made a US$50,000 donation to the Chemeketa Community Foundation to support the campus art gallery, "to do more exhibits that explore diversity and new viewpoints".

Schuette made the largest donation in the history of the college in 2011, when she gave a charitable remainder unitrust that had been established in 2006 in the amount of US$287,000. The gift supplements a scholarship fund begun while she served as president of the college, "for people who have some aspect of their lives, whether ethnicity or not having a great income or special circumstances, that make it more of a challenge to perhaps even see themselves at Chemeketa".

== Selected publications ==
- Schuette, Gretchen; Schrader, Hans (April 1, 1981). "Diatom taphocoenoses in the coastal upwelling area off South West Africa". Marine Micropaleontology. 6 (2): 131–155. Bibcode:1981MarMP...6..131S. doi:10.1016/0377-8398(81)90002-5. ISSN 0377-8398.
- Schuette, Gretchen; Schrader, Hans (1981), "Diatoms in Surface Sediments: A Reflection of Coastal Upwelling", Coastal Upwelling, American Geophysical Union (AGU), pp. 372–380, doi:10.1029/co001p0372, ISBN 978-1-118-66532-9
- Schuette, Gretchen; Bailey, Robert E. (1980). "Fossil Diatom Assemblages After European Settlement from Four Lakes in Lake and Newaygo Counties, Michigan (USA)". The American Midland Naturalist. 103 (2): 322–332. doi:10.2307/2424630. ISSN 0003-0031. JSTOR 2424630.
- Schuette, Gretchen; with others (1986). "1986 Student Success Strategies: Access, Assessment, Intervention". ERIC.

== Awards, honors ==
- 2002 Tenison Haley Outstanding Individual Contribution Award of the Oregon Diversity Institute Conference
- 2003 Carolyn DesJardins Leadership Award of the American Association for Women in Community Colleges Conference
- 2007 Oregon Women of Achievement
- 2011 Gretchen Schuette Art Gallery at Chemeketa Community College, "which faculty and the Chemeketa Community College Foundation asked be named for the former president".
