= Newberg Public Library =

Historic library in Oregon, U.S.

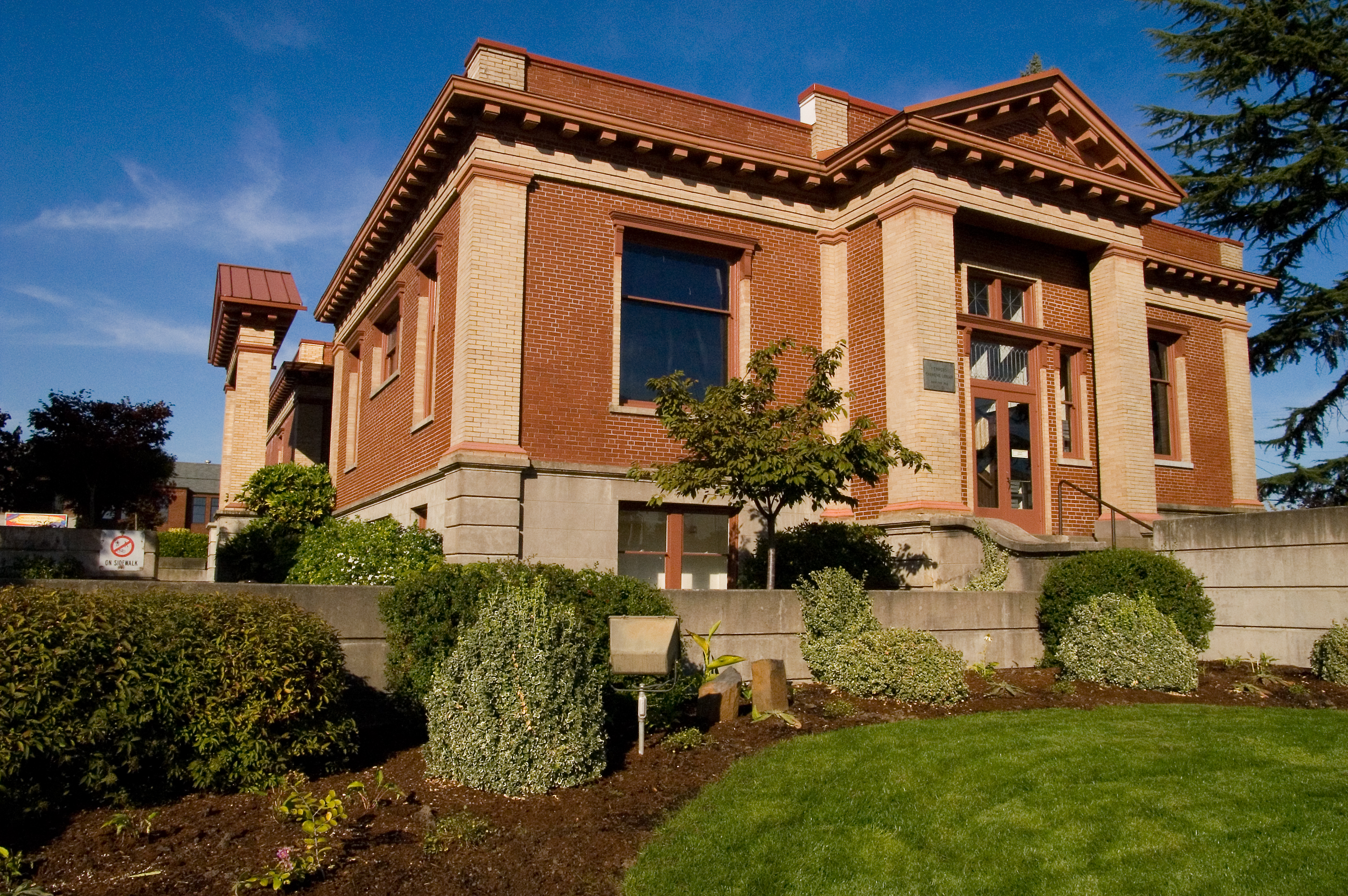
- Photograph of the outside of the building
- 45.30141°N 122.97476°W
- Location: Newberg, Oregon, United States
- Established: 1908

Newberg Public Library is a public library system that serves the city of Newberg, Oregon, United States serving a population 25,138 as of 2020.

== History ==
The Newberg Public Library was established in downtown Newberg in 1908. The city was granted the funds for a "Carnegie Library" from Andrew Carnegie in 1912 and this building is still used today with an addition built on in 1986.

== Services ==
The Library provides residents of the Chehalem Valley with access to a variety of resources. The Library has been in downtown Newberg since 1908. Today the Library has expanded from simply providing books, to becoming the information resource for the community.

The Newberg Public Library is a member of the Chemeketa Cooperative Regional Library Service.
