= Chemeketa Cooperative Regional Library Service =

Library cooperative in Oregon, U.S.

- Location: Oregon, United States
- Type: Library cooperative
- Established: 1974; 52 years ago

Other information
- Website: catalog.ccrls.org

The Chemeketa Cooperative Regional Library Service (CCRLS) is a library cooperative serving residents of the Chemeketa Community College district, which includes most of Polk, Yamhill, and Marion Counties, and a small portion of Linn County in Oregon. The CCRLS offices are located on the campus of the Chemeketa Community College in Hayesville, an unincorporated suburb northeast of Salem, Oregon. The Cooperative works in tandem with member libraries to determine services, policies, and procedures. The organization is governed by the College Board of Education, with input from the CCRLS Advisory Council, which is made up of one "lay member" from each county and representing the rural areas, five library directors, and one city manager. Although considered a public library by the State of Oregon, CCRLS has no holdings of its own, instead operating as a service overlay to coordinate 16 independent and locally owned libraries into a cohesive system able to provide service to all citizens of the district.

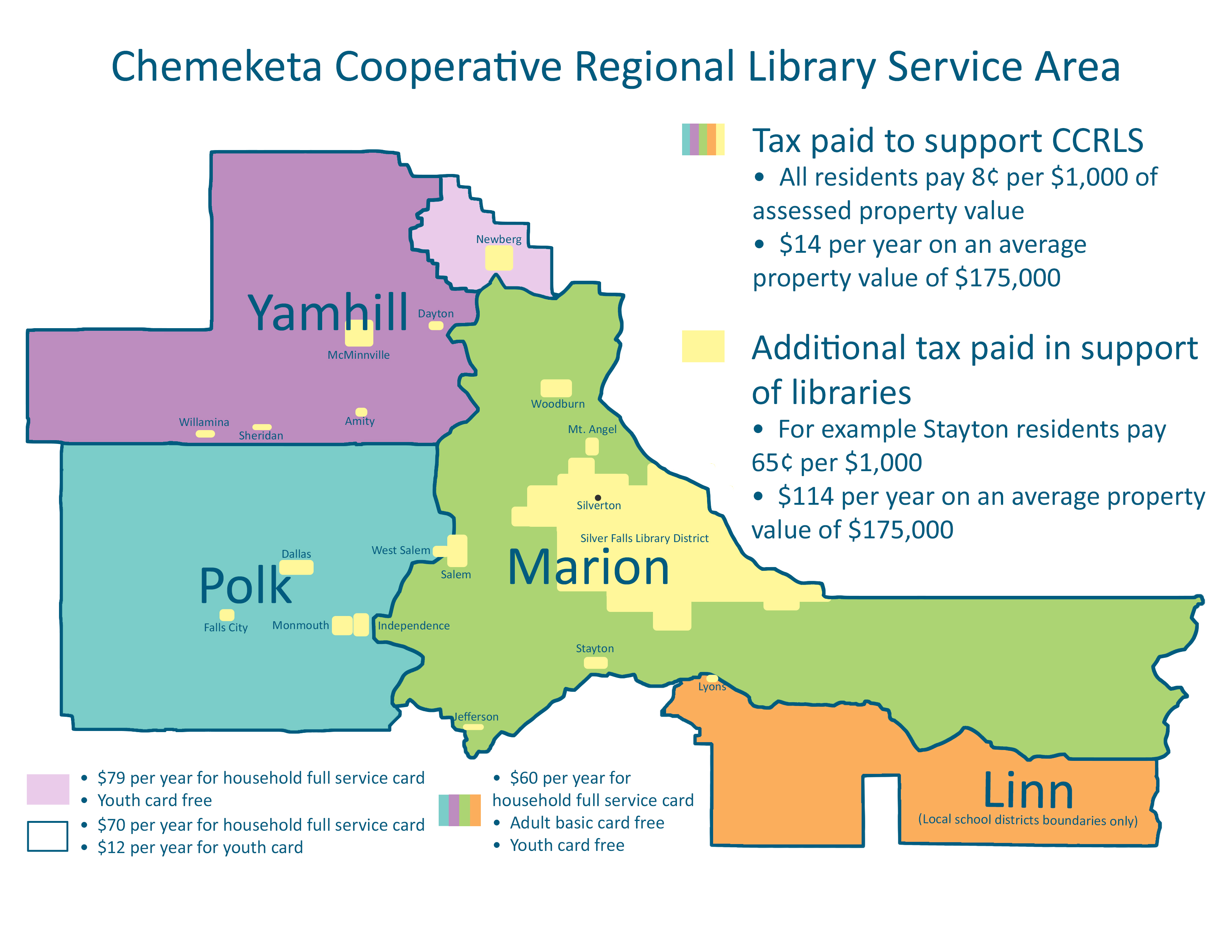
A map of the CCRLS district boundaries, showing individual library service areas, unserved areas, and detailing the CCRLS funding structure

== History ==
In 1972, the Oregon State Library awarded a $12,000 Library Services and Technology Act grant to the Mid-Willamette Valley Council of Governments to fund a study of the library needs of citizens in the tri-county area surrounding Salem, Oregon. At that time, statistics showed that of the 240,500 residents of the area, 100,000 did not have local library service. The plan that developed as a result of this study recommended implementation of five basic services:

- a bookmobile,
- courier service between libraries,
- a district-wide library card,
- provision of reference and information service for smaller libraries, and
- a film circuit service.

A bookmobile could not be funded in the first year of operation, so a books-by-mail service was implemented instead. Initial funding for this was provided by a 1973 Library Services and Construction Act grant. At that time, the Chemeketa Community College administration was designated the fiscal agent for the grant money to fund the new Library Service. The Cooperative began operating in 1974, and in its first two years provided library service to 41,800 previously unserved, rural users. In 1975, special legislation (Oregon Senate Bill 160) authorized community college districts to establish public libraries, clearing the way for CCRLS to operate as a department of Chemeketa Community College.

During its first decade of existence, CCRLS was funded through a series of levies. CCRLS was highly visible to the public because in order to keep the service running, CCRLS needed to approach the voters every few years for funding. Services changed in a minor way, with books-by-mail eventually being phased out as a less cost-effective service. In 1985, the Chemeketa District voters approved a tax base for the college, a portion of which was dedicated to CCRLS. This created (before the years of property tax limitations), the first stable funding for a public library multi-jurisdictional system in the State of Oregon. This funding allowed CCRLS to pursue library automation, and for the first time, the CCRLS member libraries were linked by a computer network and integrated library system that allowed library users to search all 18 libraries' catalogs at one time, and request material from any of those locations to be delivered to their home library within days.

== CCRLS today ==
CCRLS courier truck at the 4th of July parade in Dallas, Oregon, 2011

Current CCRLS services include: reimbursement to cities for serving non-city patrons, courier service among libraries, lost book reimbursement, an integrated automated system, net lending reimbursement, a rotating collection of bestsellers for small libraries, and a pass-through grant from state funding for children's services. All direct services to patrons, including bookmobile services, have been discontinued. Instead, CCRLS provides greater service to the member libraries in the form of computer networking and equipment, centralized software administration and support, cataloging services, and payment for numerous online resources.

== CCRLS member libraries ==
CCRLS membership includes 18 libraries; 16 are public libraries, one is a community college library, and one is a tribal library.

- Amity Public Library, Amity, Oregon
- Chemeketa Community College Library, Chemeketa Community College
- Confederated Tribes of Grand Ronde Library, Grand Ronde, Oregon
- Dallas Public Library, Dallas, Oregon
- Dayton (Mary Gilkey) Public Library, Dayton, Oregon
- Independence Public Library, Independence, Oregon
- Jefferson Public Library, Jefferson, Oregon
- Lyons Public Library, Lyons, Oregon
- McMinnville Public Library, McMinnville, Oregon
- Monmouth Public Library, Monmouth, Oregon
- Mount Angel Public Library, Mount Angel, Oregon
- Newberg Public Library, Newberg, Oregon
- Salem Public Library, Salem, Oregon
- Sheridan Public Library, Sheridan, Oregon
- Silver Falls Library District, Silverton, Oregon
- Stayton Public Library, Stayton, Oregon
- Willamina Public Library, Willamina, Oregon
- Woodburn Public Library, Woodburn, Oregon

== See also ==
- Library Information Network of Clackamas County
- List of libraries in Oregon
- Multnomah County Library
- Washington County Cooperative Library Services
