= Buster Bronco (Boise State) =

Boise State University mascot

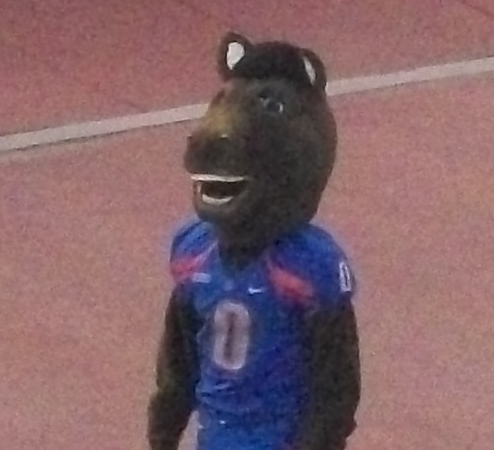
- The mascot Buster Bronco during a game in 2010, wearing his jersey (#0).
- University: Boise State University
- Conference: Pac-12
- Description: anthropomorphized bronco
- First seen: 1932

Buster Bronco is the official mascot of Boise State University.

Buster Bronco, is a person in a brown bronco costume with a large head and an open mouth. Buster Bronco wears #0.

The idea to have a Bronco as a mascot originated in 1932 by Boise State Junior College Students.Buster Becomes A Bronco is a children's book based on Buster Bronco that was published in 2008.

Buster Bronco was ranked third on the Sports Illustrated Power Mascot Rankings in 2007. Buster was also a candidate for the Capitol One Mascot of the Year for the 2008–2009 season.

== See also ==
- Buster Bronco is also the name of the mascot of Western Michigan University.
- The Denver Broncos' mascot is a live horse.
