= Boise State University =

Public university in Boise, Idaho, US

- Former names: St. Margarets School (1892–1932); Boise Junior College (1932–1965); Boise College (1965–1969); Boise State College (1969–1974)
- Motto: Splendor sine Occasu (Latin)
- Motto in English: "Splendour Without Diminishment"
- Type: Public research university
- Established: September 6, 1932; 94 years ago
- Parent institution: Idaho State Board of Education
- Accreditation: NWCCU
- Academic affiliations: USU; Space-grant; CUIBE
- Endowment: $184.25 million (2025)
- President: David W. Hahn
- Provost: Zeynep Hansen
- Faculty: 1,504 (Fall 2025)
- Total staff: 3,708 (Fall 2025)
- Students: 28,536 (Fall 2026)
- Undergraduates: 18,942 (Fall 2026)
- Postgraduates: 2,692 (Fall 2026)
- Location: Boise, Idaho, United States; 43.604°N 116.204°W
- Campus: 285 acres (1.15 km^{2}); Midsize city
- Newspaper: The Arbiter
- Colors: Blue and orange
- Nickname: Broncos
- Sporting affiliations: NCAA Division I FBS – Pac-12
- Mascot: Buster Bronco
- Website: boisestate.edu

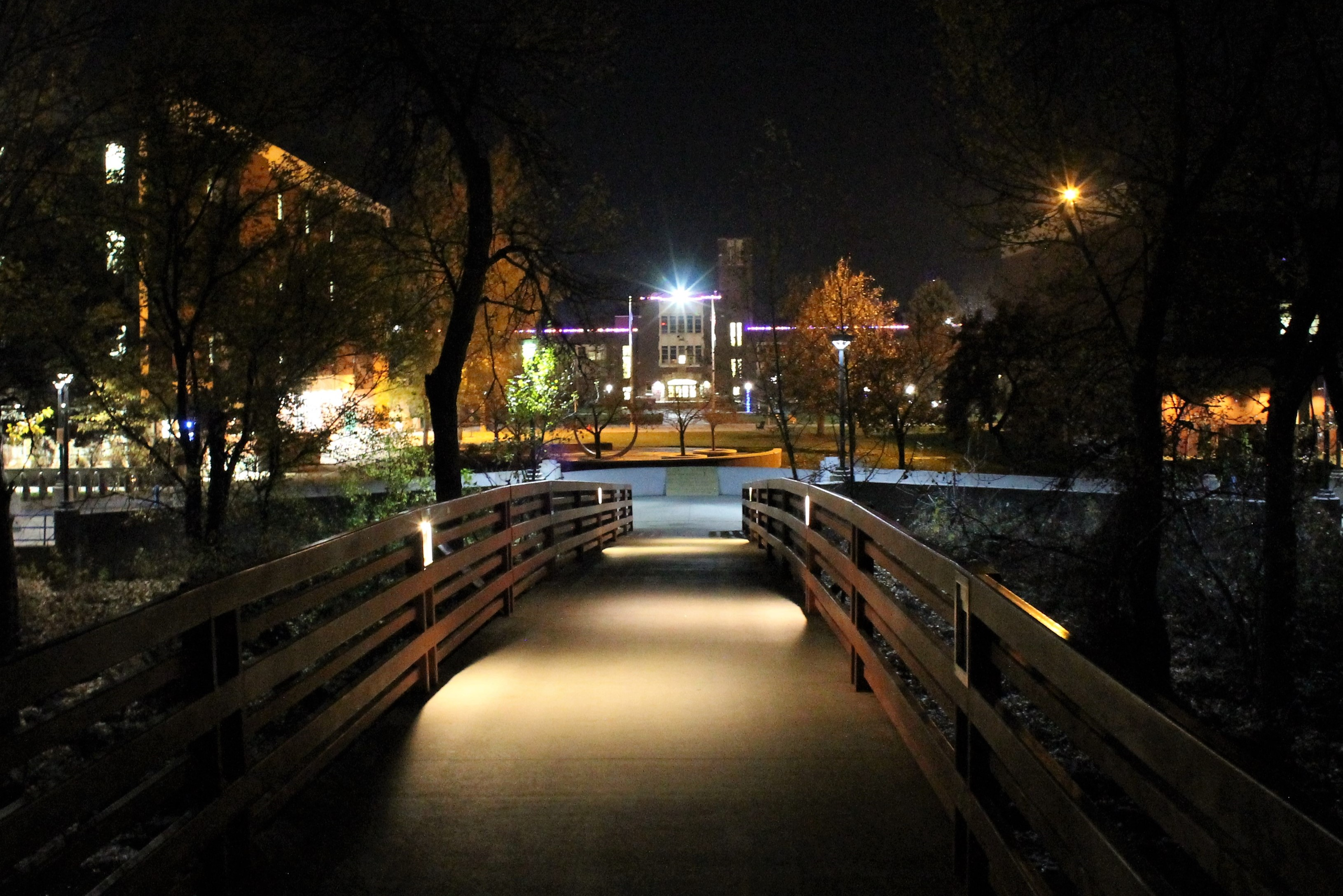
Administration Building seen from Friendship Bridge

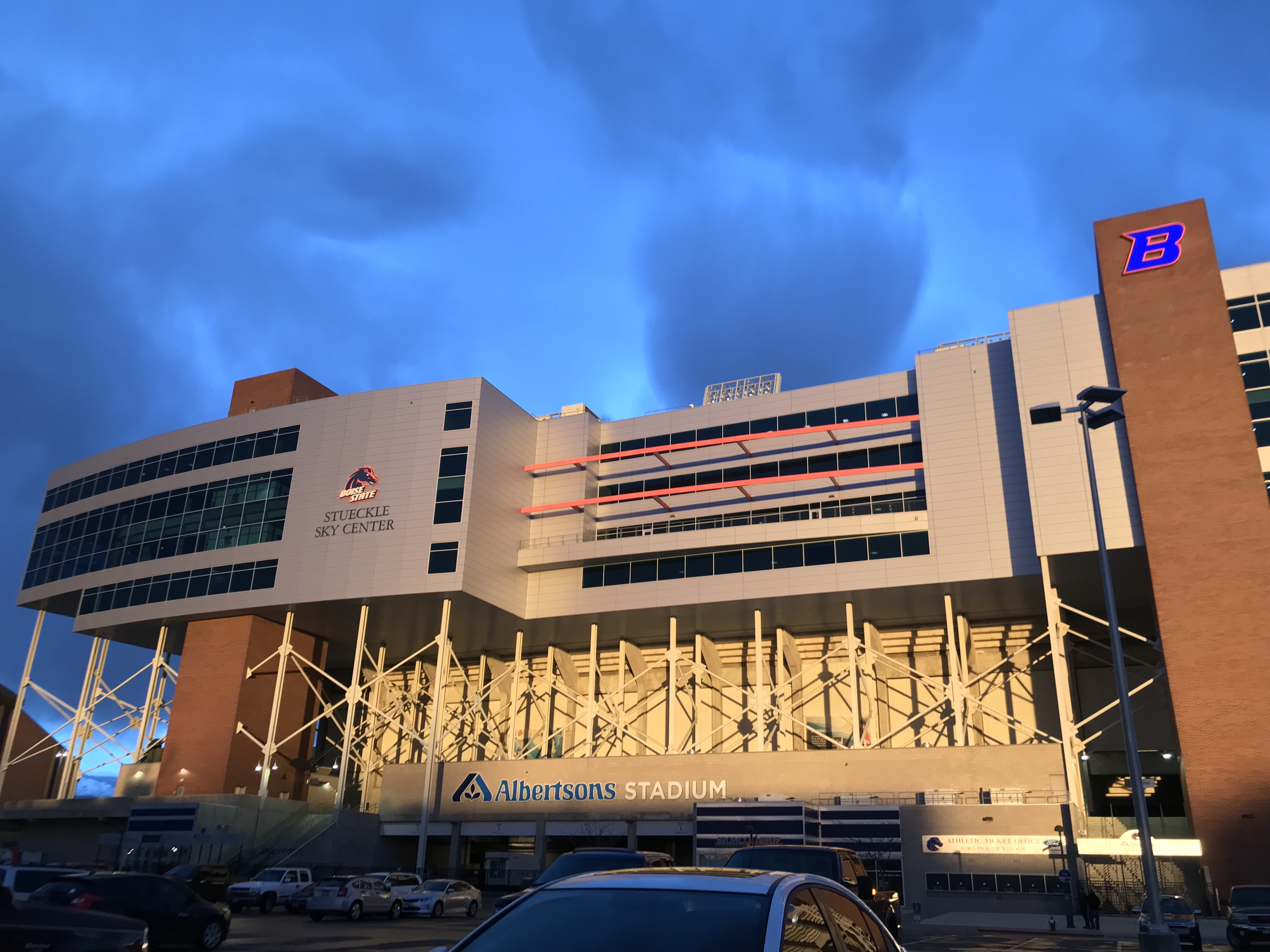
Stueckle Sky Center

Boise State University (BSU) is a public research university in Boise, Idaho, United States. Founded in 1932 by the Episcopal Church, it became an independent junior college in 1934 and has been awarding baccalaureate and master's degrees since 1965. It became a public institution in 1969.

Boise State offers more than 100 graduate programs, including a variety of MBA programs and the MAcc program in the College of Business and Economics; master's and PhD programs in the Colleges of Engineering, Arts & Sciences, and Education; MPA program in the School of Public Service; and the MPH program in the College of Health Sciences. It is classified among "R2: Doctoral Universities – High research activity". In the 2024 fiscal year, Boise State reported total research awards exceeding $83 million and research expenditures over $70 million.

The university's intercollegiate athletic teams, the Broncos, compete in NCAA Division I as a member of the Pac-12 Conference.

== History ==
The school became Idaho's third state university in 1974, after the University of Idaho (1889) and Idaho State University (1963). Boise State awards associate, bachelor's, master's, and doctoral degrees, and is accredited by the Northwest Commission on Colleges and Universities. The current number of living graduates (alumni) is over 102,000.

Year	Event
1892	St. Margaret's School was founded in Christ Chapel (Boise, Idaho), a forerunner to Boise Junior College
1932	BSU was founded as Boise Junior College by the Episcopal Church at St. Margaret's Hall
1933	First season of football
1934	Episcopal Church ends its affiliation and board of directors after assumes leadership.
1940	Campus is moved to present site on the south bank of the Boise River: Formerly the site of the Boise Airport – (photo – 1930s) – (photo – 1940s); Administration Building opens, built by WPA – (photo – 1940s); College Field (1940–49), the first football stadium, opens at site of present Student Union Building – (photo 1) – (photo 2)
1942	Old Student Union opens – (photo – 1940s) – (photo – 1950s)
1947	After a year as an assistant, Lyle Smith is elevated to head coach of the football team.: overall record of 156-26-8 (.848) with five undefeated seasons, 16 conference titles, and a national JC championship (1958); steps down after 1967 season to become athletic director
1950	First Bronco Stadium (1950–69), on present site – replaced in 1970
1951	Completion of first dormitories: Driscoll Hall (men) and Morrison Hall (women)
1955	Bronco Gymnasium constructed – (photo)
1958	Football team wins NJCAA national championship
1964	Library opens – (photo)
1965	Baccalaureate degrees introduced; becomes Boise College: Alumni Association is formed, enrollment reaches 5,000
1966	Liberal Arts Building constructed – (photo 1) – (photo 2)
1967	New Student Union Building constructed – (photo): Chaffee Hall dormitories constructed – (photo); John Barnes becomes the college's third president
1968	Football team begins competition as a four-year school, competing as an independent in NAIA for two seasons: New athletic director Lyle Smith hires Tony Knap to replace himself as head football coach
1969	State system of higher education assumes control, becomes Boise State College: Final football season in second Bronco Stadium (northwest–southeast alignment) – (photo – late 1960s) (photo – 1968)
1970	Construction of multiple buildings: Business, Vocational Education, and Towers dormitories: BSC joins the Big Sky Conference for men's athletics, moves to NCAA Division II ("College Division" until 1973); New Bronco Stadium opens September 11 (now a north–south alignment) – seating capacity of 14,500 and a green AstroTurf field – (photo – 1971)
1971	Begins publishing the Western Writers Series, monographs focusing on authors of the American Frontier and American West; expansion of Student Union Building (1967); Auxiliary Gymnasium completed
1972	Four-story addition to Library (1964) completed
1974	University status granted, becomes Boise State University on February 22
1975	Bronco Stadium adds upper deck to east side: 20,000 capacity – (photo): football team wins third consecutive Big Sky title
1976	Tony Knap departs for UNLV; UCLA assistant coach Jim Criner is named head football coach for 1976 season
1977	Barnes resigns after spring semester; Richard Bullington, vice president of academic affairs, serves as interim president
1978	Science/Nursing building opens; John Keiser becomes president on August 1; Big Sky (& BSU) moves up to the new Division I-AA
1979	Seven-story Education building dedicated in January; enrollment reaches 10,000
1980	construction of BSU Pavilion begins in February, (photo 1981) – displaces tennis courts and baseball field – (photo – 1971) (photo – late 1970s): final baseball season (played at Borah Field), dropped as a varsity sport in June, due to Title IX; football field at Bronco Stadium dedicated as "Lyle Smith Field" on November 8.; football team wins the I-AA national championship on December 20 in Sacramento
1981	Lyle Smith retires after 35 years at BSU, last 13 as athletic director.: football team advances to I-AA semifinals
1982	BSU Pavilion (multi-purpose arena) opens in mid-May for commencement – (photo – mid 1980s): tennis courts relocated to former baseball infield
1983	Jim Criner departs for Iowa State, defensive coordinator Lyle Setencich promoted to head football coach for 1983 season
1984	Velma V. Morrison Center for performing arts opens on April 7
1986	Blue AstroTurf field installed at Bronco Stadium in summer, the first (and only) of its kind: football team posts first losing record since 1946, head coach Setencich resigns in November
1987	Washington assistant coach Skip Hall becomes head football coach
1989	Campus School acquired from the Boise School District in April
1990	football team reaches Division I-AA semifinals
1991	President John Keiser fired by state board of education on September 20.
1992	first doctoral degree approved: Ed.D. in curriculum and instruction: enrollment reaches 15,000; the state's largest
1993	Pokey Allen from Portland State becomes head football coach, following the resignation (Nov. 1992) of Skip Hall
1994	football team wins Big Sky title and reaches the I-AA national championship game
1995	final football season in Big Sky Conference and Division I-AA: BSU helped fund a grant for the Idaho-based film Not This Part of the World.
1996	athletic program moves to Big West Conference and NCAA Division I-A.: wrestling remains in the Pac-10, as an affiliate member.; Head football coach Pokey Allen dies of cancer in late December; bachelor's programs established in civil, electrical, and mechanical engineering
1997	Bronco Stadium expansion in south corners increases seating capacity to 30,000: Houston Nutt from Murray State becomes head football coach; College of Engineering is formally established
1998	Houston Nutt departs for Arkansas, Oregon assistant coach Dirk Koetter becomes head football coach for 1998 season
1999	football team wins its first Big West title and the Humanitarian Bowl against Louisville
2000	football team wins second Big West title and Humanitarian Bowl against UTEP
2001	athletics moves to the Western Athletic Conference (WAC), wrestling remains in the Pac-10, as affiliate member: Dirk Koetter departs for Arizona State, assistant Dan Hawkins promoted to head football coach for 2001 season
2002	football team wins first WAC title and Humanitarian Bowl against Iowa State
2003	football team wins second WAC title and Fort Worth Bowl over host TCU
2004	enrollment reaches 18,456: BSU Pavilion renamed Taco Bell Arena in June ($4 million for 15 years); football team goes undefeated in regular season for the first time as a four-year school, wins its third straight WAC title and finishes 9th in the BCS rankings, but lost the Liberty Bowl in Memphis to Louisville in a match-up of the two best BCS non-AQ conference teams that year.
2005	football team wins fourth straight WAC title, but loses MPC Computers Bowl at home to Boston College.
2006	BSU wins the WAC Commissioner's Cup for the 2005–06 academic year.: Dan Hawkins departs for Colorado, assistant Chris Petersen promoted to head football coach for 2006 season; senior Ben Cherrington (157 lb.) wins NCAA national championship in wrestling; Cherrington and Tyler Sherfey are named the 2006 Pac-10 Conference Wrestler of the Year and Newcomer of the Year, respectively.; football team is undefeated for the second time in three years, wins fifth straight WAC title and earns first BCS berth in the Fiesta Bowl against Oklahoma in January 2007.
2007	football team wins the Fiesta Bowl in January in a thrilling overtime finish. BSU finished the 2006 season as the only undefeated team in the nation (after Ohio State lost to Florida in the national championship game), and placed #5 in the final AP poll, with one first place vote, BSU's highest ranking ever.: State of Idaho approves funding for a $35.9 million addition to Bronco Stadium. Expansion replaces the original press box (1970), adds luxury suites, club seats, and loge boxes in time for the 2008 season. The new capacity is 32,000.; BSU sells the film rights of the 2006 season to Michael Hoffman and Iron Circle Pictures, who will produce a documentary and later a feature film based on the story of the football program.; 2006 football team wins two ESPY Awards in the categories of "Best Game" (2007 Fiesta Bowl) and "Best Play" (Game-winning Statue of Liberty play).; Fiesta Bowl MVP Jared Zabransky appears as the cover athlete of the popular EA Sports video game NCAA Football 08.; junior Luke Shields is one of four male tennis players representing the U.S. at the 2007 Pan American Games in Rio de Janeiro.; Boise State celebrates its 75th anniversary and announces "Destination Distinction," a campaign to raise $175 million.
2008	Broncos join the "10-20-20" club (10 football wins, 20 men's basketball wins, 20 women's basketball wins) for the 2007–08 season, only the 20th school since 1980 to achieve the feat.: BSU announces NASA Teacher in Space Barbara Morgan will start her full-time position as a Distinguished Educator in Residence; football team regained the WAC title and met TCU in the Poinsettia Bowl in San Diego, but lost 16–17.
2009	undefeated football team retained the WAC title and again played TCU in the postseason, in the Fiesta Bowl, and BSU won 17–10.

== Campus ==
The 285-acre (1.15 km^{2}) campus is located near downtown Boise, on the south bank of the Boise River, opposite Julia Davis Park. With more than 170 buildings, the campus is at an elevation of 2,700 feet (825 m) above sea level, bounded by Capitol Boulevard on the west and Broadway Avenue to the east. Through the 1930s, the site was the city's airport.

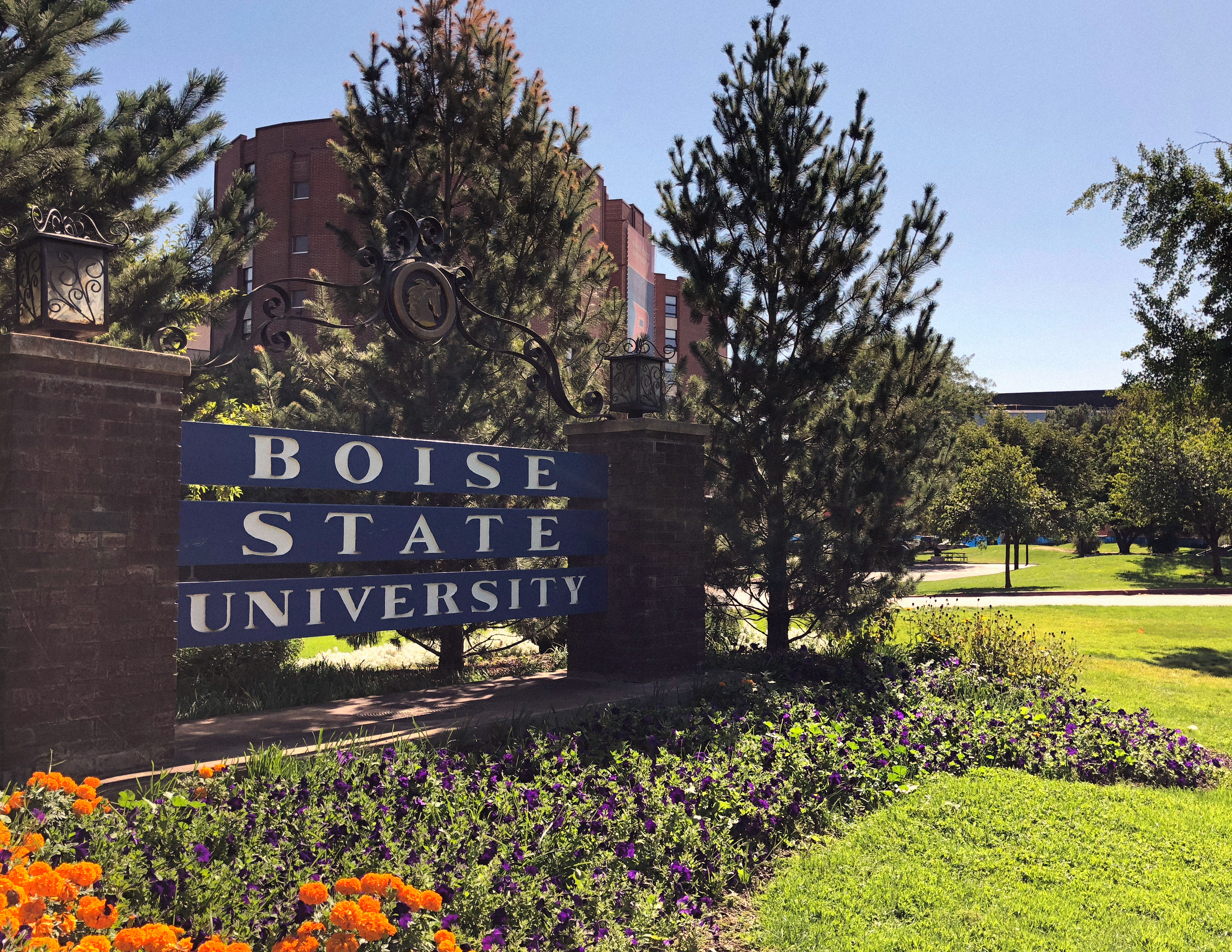
Boise State West Entrance

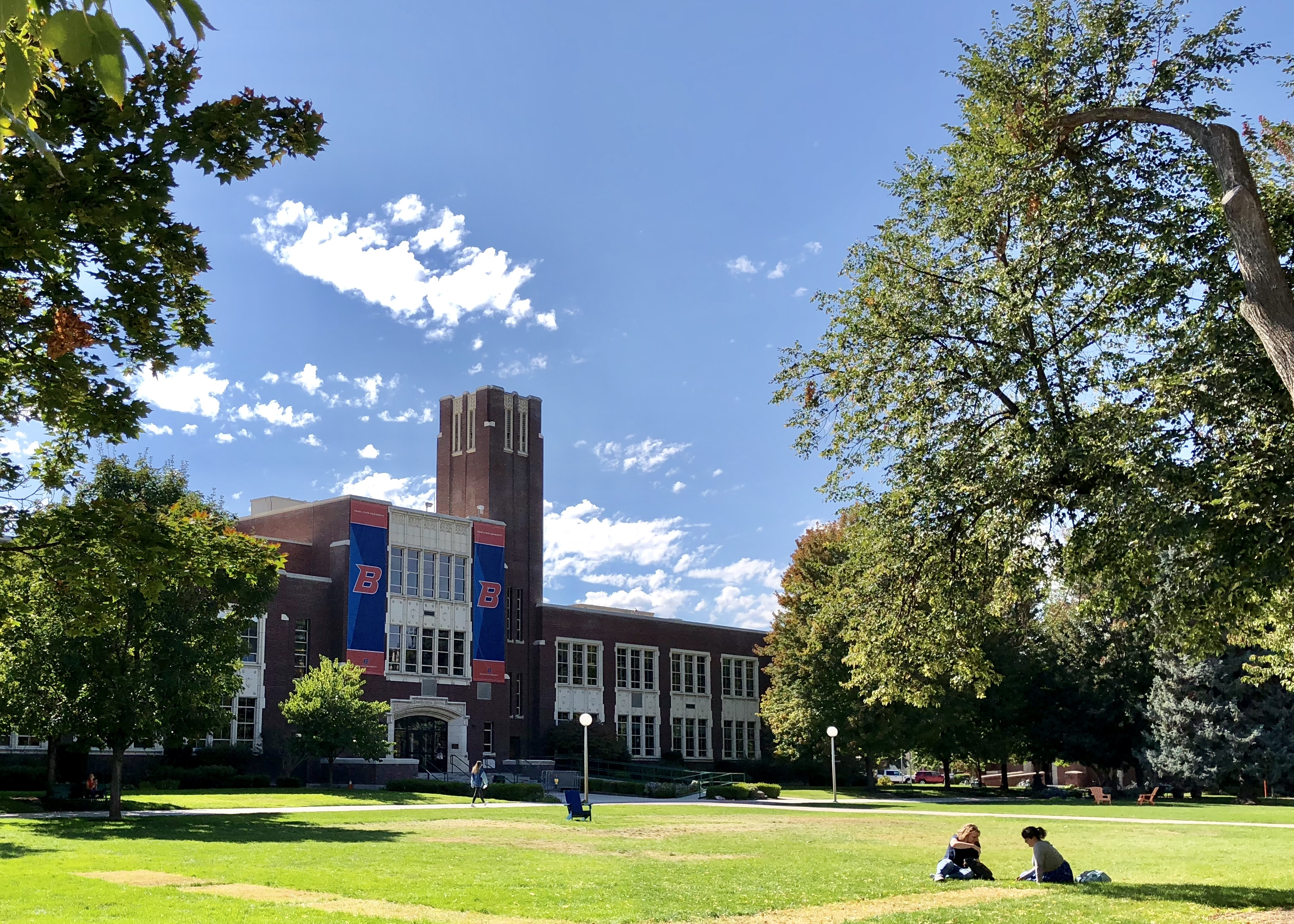
Main Campus, 2018

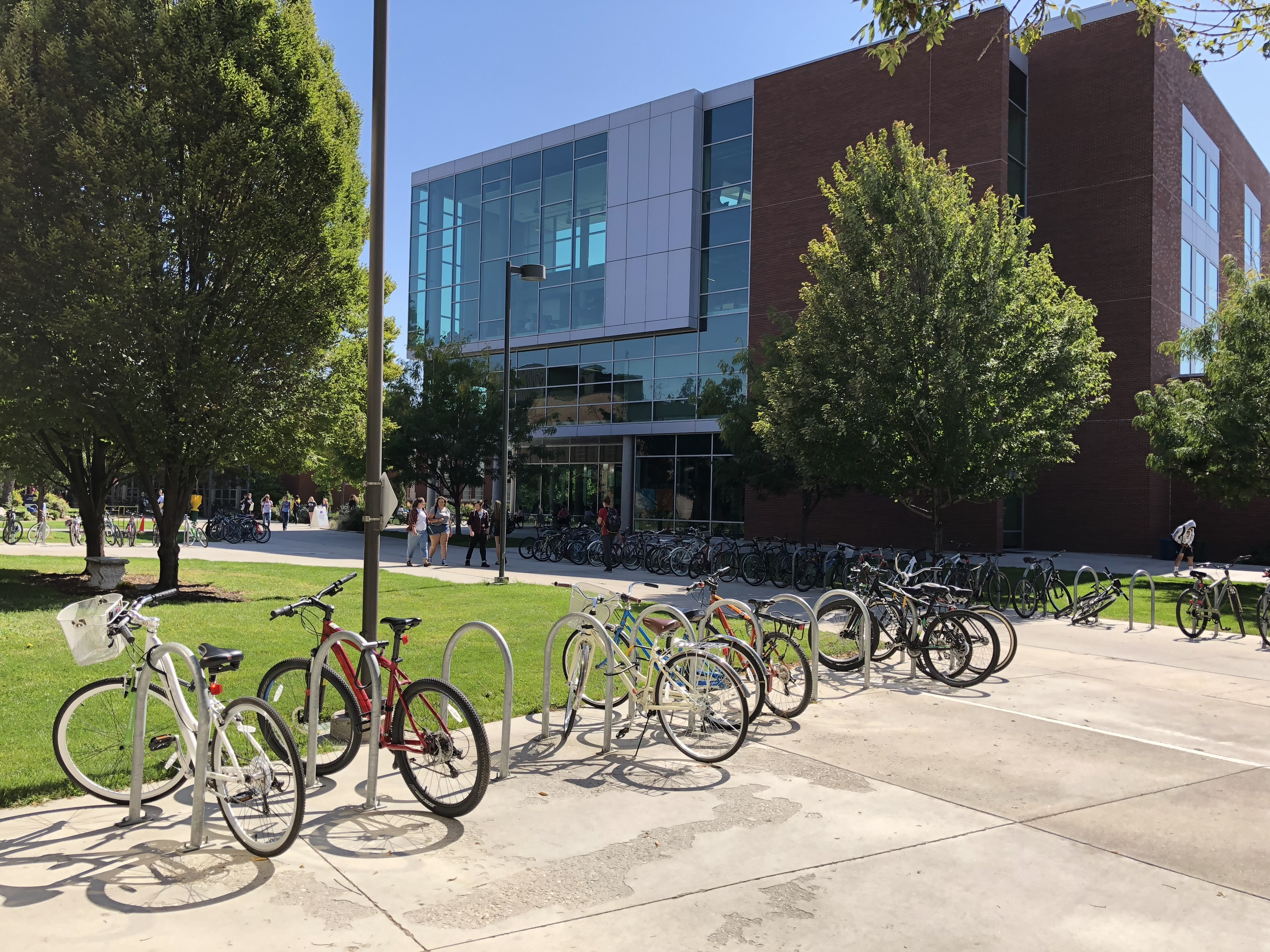
Interactive Learning Center

=== Albertsons Library ===
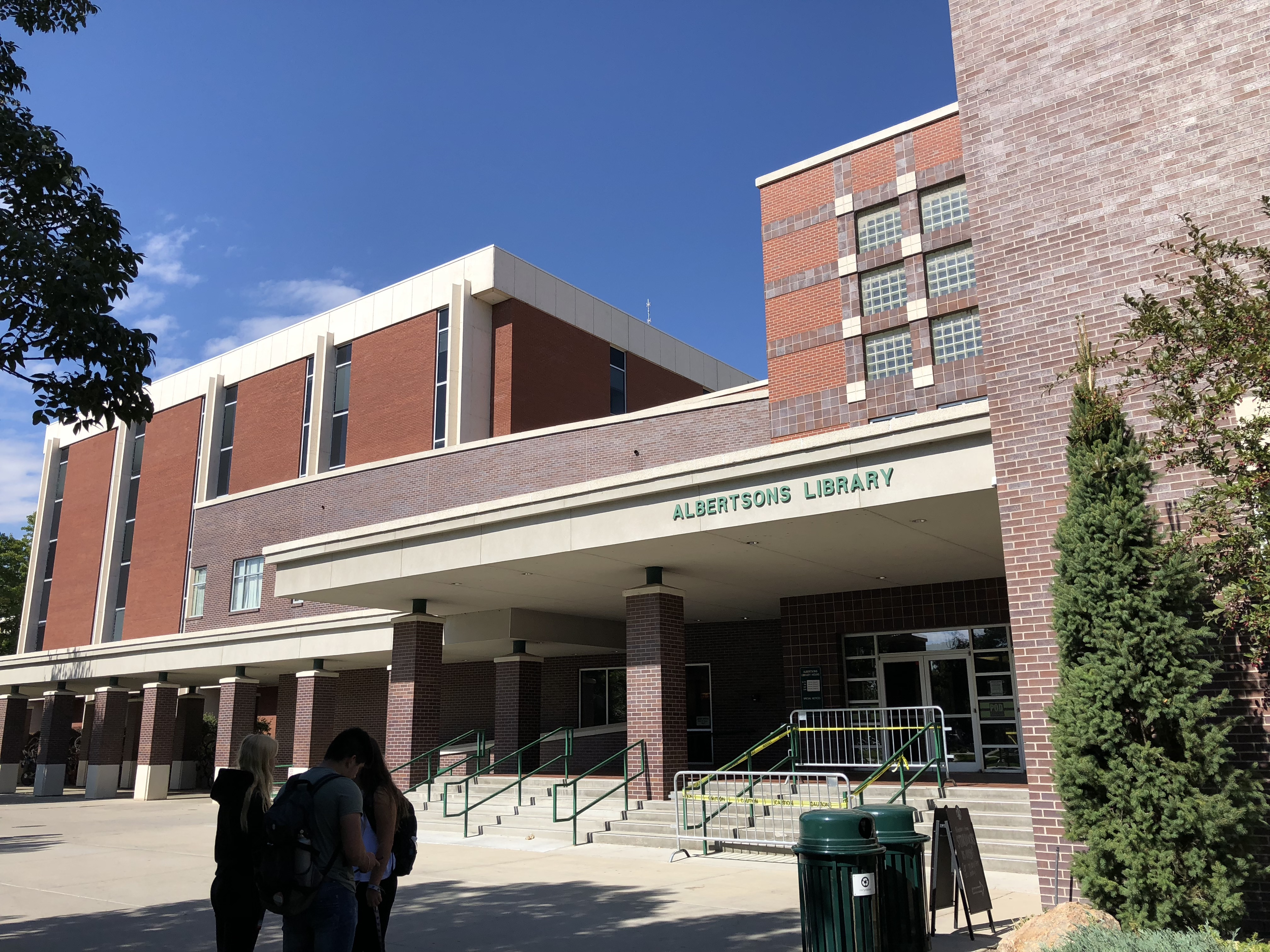
Albertsons Library

The university library is named for grocery pioneer Joe Albertson. It houses more than 650,000 books, over 130,000 periodicals, 107 public terminals for student use, and access to over 300 online databases.

=== Morrison Center ===
The Velma V. Morrison Center for the Performing Arts has 2,000 seats in its primary performance hall, and hosts a wide variety of fine arts performances, including the Broadway in Boise series, concerts and other events. The venue opened its doors in April 1984.

=== Computer Science Department ===
The computer science department moved away from the main campus to a new building in downtown Boise. The CS department occupies 53,549 gross square feet, the full second and third floors of the building. The university's CS program is now located in the same building as Clearwater Analytics and within short walking distance of about 20 more of Boise's top technology companies.

=== Micron Center for Materials Research ===
The Micron Center for Materials Research was established with a $25 million gift from Micron Technology, which is headquartered in Boise. Completed in 2020, the building was designed by Hummel Architects and Anderson Mason Dale Architects, with Hoffman Construction as lead contractor. The building is designed with one research wing, home to sensitive equipment, and state of the art research laboratories, and a second wing, to hold classrooms, and office space. This latest donation by Micron marks a total of $40 million invested in materials science and engineering programs and associated research at BSU, resulting in a full complement of degrees in materials science and engineering including bachelor's, master's and doctoral programs.

In 2025, researchers from Boise State's Nagarajan Lab received a five-year federal biochemistry grant, the first of its kind awarded in Idaho, to advance molecular research and interdisciplinary science education.

=== Other campuses ===
Extended Studies at Boise State offers regional programming at the College of Western Idaho in Nampa, Mountain Home Air Force Base, Gowen Field, Twin Falls, Lewiston, and Coeur d'Alene. BSU also offers 29 degrees and certificates fully online. Beginning in 2016, Boise State began partnering with the Harvard Business School to offer the Harvard Business School Online business fundamentals program to Idaho students and the business community. This collaboration is the only such Harvard collaboration with a public U.S. university.

== Academics and organization ==
Boise State's more than 190 fields of study are organized into the following colleges and schools:

- College of Arts and Sciences
- College of Business and Economics
- College of Education and Public Service
- College of Engineering
- Graduate College
- College of Health Sciences

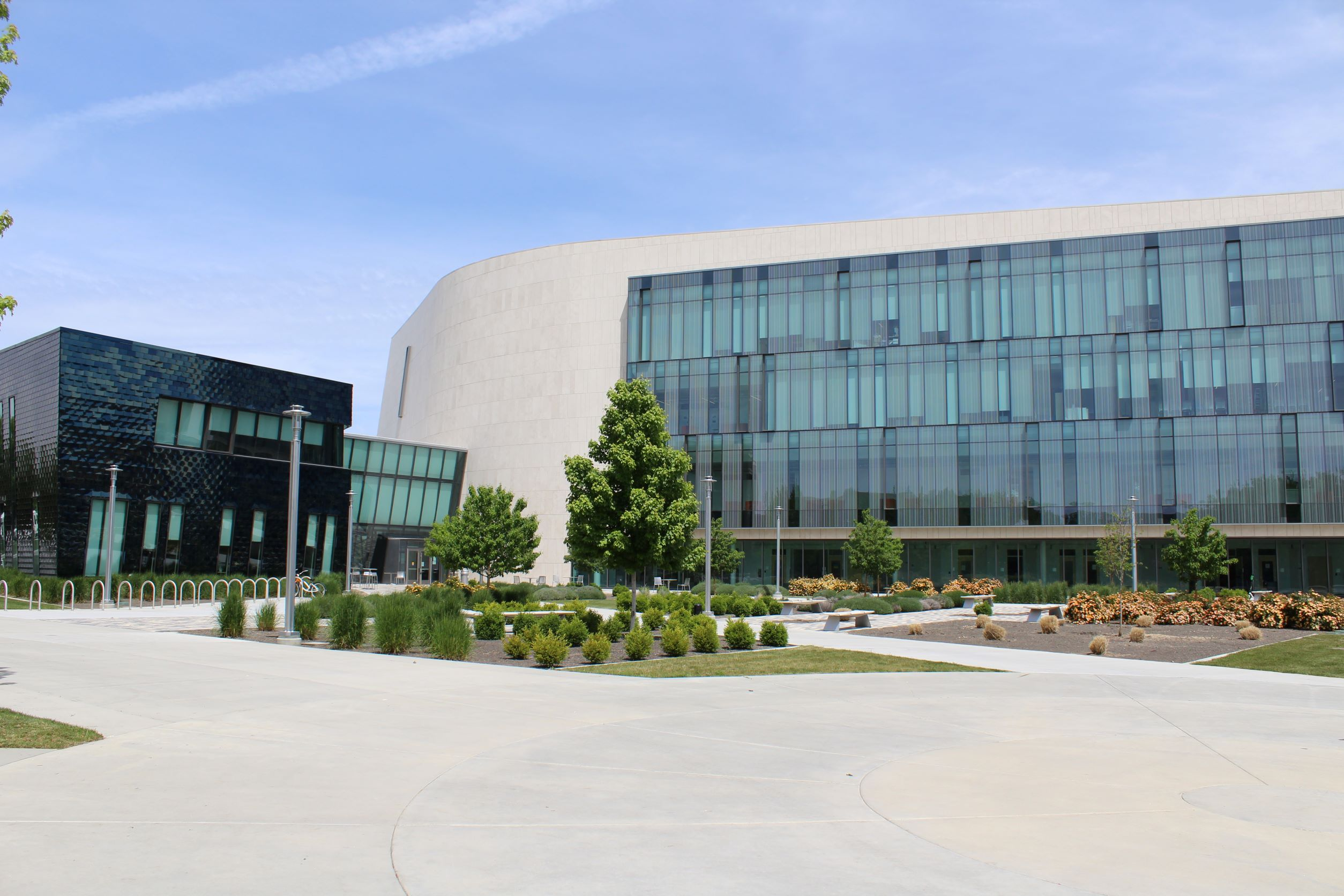
Center for the Visual Arts Boise State University, 2022

The university also has an honors college. Within the College of Arts and Sciences is the School of the Environment, approved by the Idaho State Board of Education in 2022 and established in 2023.

Boise State’s fall 2025 enrollment reached a record 28,519 students. Approximately 70% of the total student body are Idaho residents.

In the 2024–2025 school year, the university awarded degrees and certificates to 5,402 distinct graduates, including 72 doctoral degrees and 1,073 master's degrees. The university is classified among "R2: Doctoral Universities – High research activity."

=== Publishing ===
In 1971, the university published the Western Writers Series, monographs focusing on authors of the American Frontier and American West. BSU ceased publishing new titles at the end of 2006. The university maintains an on-line library of publications and documents related to Idaho history through the Albertsons Library.

The Center for Idaho History and Politics offers a nine-credit place-based field school called "Investigate Boise" which focuses on heritage, government, and urban affairs. Each series of classes results in a student written and faculty edited publication.

For the 2024–2025 academic year, the middle 50% of enrolled students scored between 1050 and 1360 on the SAT (with a 50th percentile of 1210), between 530 and 680 on the SAT Evidence-Based Reading and Writing section (50th percentile: 610), and between 520 and 680 on the SAT Math section (50th percentile: 600).

== Athletics ==
Boise State's athletic nickname is the Broncos, and the official mascot is Buster Bronco. Men's teams include football, basketball, cross country, track and field, golf, and tennis. Its women's teams include volleyball, basketball, cross country, swimming and diving, soccer, track and field, gymnastics, golf, softball and tennis.

Boise State College joined the NCAA in 1970 in the university division (Division I), except for football, which was in the college division (later Division II) for the first eight seasons. Big Sky Conference football moved up to the new Division I-AA (now FCS) in 1978, and the Broncos won the national championship two years later. BSU moved up to Division I-A (now FBS) in 1996 in the Big West Conference, joined the Western Athletic Conference (WAC) in 2001, the Mountain West Conference in 2011, and will join the Pac-12 Conference in 2026. The moves from the WAC and the Mountain West came after the conferences dropped sponsorship of football.

=== Albertsons Stadium ===
Albertsons Stadium is home to the Boise State football program. It hosted the NCAA Division I Track and Field Championships in 1994 and 1999, and has been the home to the Famous Idaho Potato Bowl since 1997.

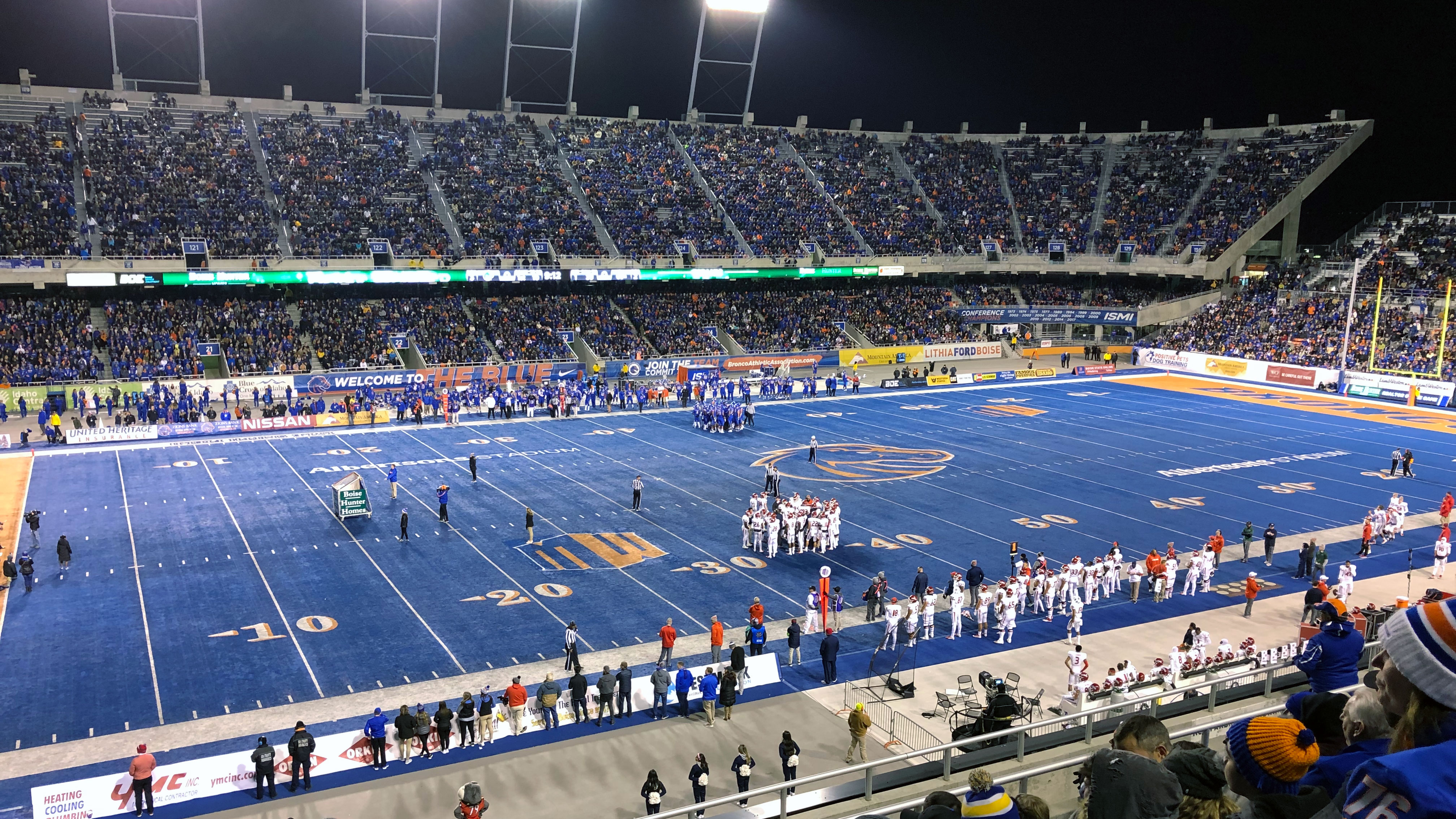
Boise State vs Fresno State on The Blue Turf, November 9th 2018

Boise State Football has a long history of success starting with the junior college days and the national championship team of 1958, coached by the father of Bronco football, Lyle Smith. Now named Lyle Smith Field in Albertsons Stadium, the synthetic turf field was standard green before 1986. "The Blue" was the idea of athletic director Gene Bleymaier and was the first non-green football field in the country. This field is also nicknamed "The Smurf Turf" due to its color. Through the end of the 2024 season, Boise State's home record was approximately 215–43 (.833) in 39 seasons on The Blue.

Ground was broken after the 1969 season, and it opened in September 1970 with a capacity of 14,500. Subsequent expansions were completed in 1975 and 1997, and current capacity sits at around 37,000.

==== ExtraMile Arena ====
Known as the "Boise State University Pavilion" until June 2004, and "Taco Bell Arena" between 2004 and 2019, ExtraMile Arena is home to BSU basketball, wrestling, women's gymnastics, community events, and several concerts each year. Opened in May 1982, the arena seats 12,380 on three levels. It has hosted rounds one and two of the NCAA basketball tournament on nine occasions from 1983 to 2018, and the third and fourth rounds of the NCAA women's tournament in 2002.

The construction of the pavilion began in February 1980 on the site of the tennis courts and a portion of the BSU baseball field. The Bronco baseball team played their home games in 1980 at Borah Field (now Bill Wigle Field) at Borah High School, and the program was discontinued that May. The tennis courts were rebuilt immediately west of the arena, on the former baseball field (infield & right field).

== Student life ==
Undergraduate demographics as of Fall 2026
Race and ethnicity	Total
White	67%
Hispanic	16%
Two or more races	6%
Asian	3%
Black	2%
Economic diversity
Low-income (Note: The percentage of students who received an income-based federal Pell grant intended for low-income students.)	24%
Affluent (Note: The percentage of students who are a part of the American middle class at the bare minimum.)	76%

Total Fall 2026 enrollment is 28,536 students (up 0.1% from the previous year), with approximately 69 percent Idaho residents. Boise State University has the largest graduate enrollment in Idaho. Nearly 94 percent of Boise State's first-year students come directly from high school.

=== Housing ===
At Boise State "18% of the students live in college-owned, -operated or -affiliated housing and 82% of students live off campus."

=== Social fraternities and sororities ===
Boise State has seen an increase in its Greek community; the community includes 25 different chapters and 2,000 members as of Fall 2025. In 2023, the fraternity Alpha Kappa Lambda was suspended for a period of four years due to hazing rituals and incidents of alcohol abuse.

== Rankings ==
Academic rankings

National
- U.S. News & World Report: 301 (tie)

Global
- U.S. News & World Report: 1534 (tie)
