= Colorado State Rams football statistical leaders =

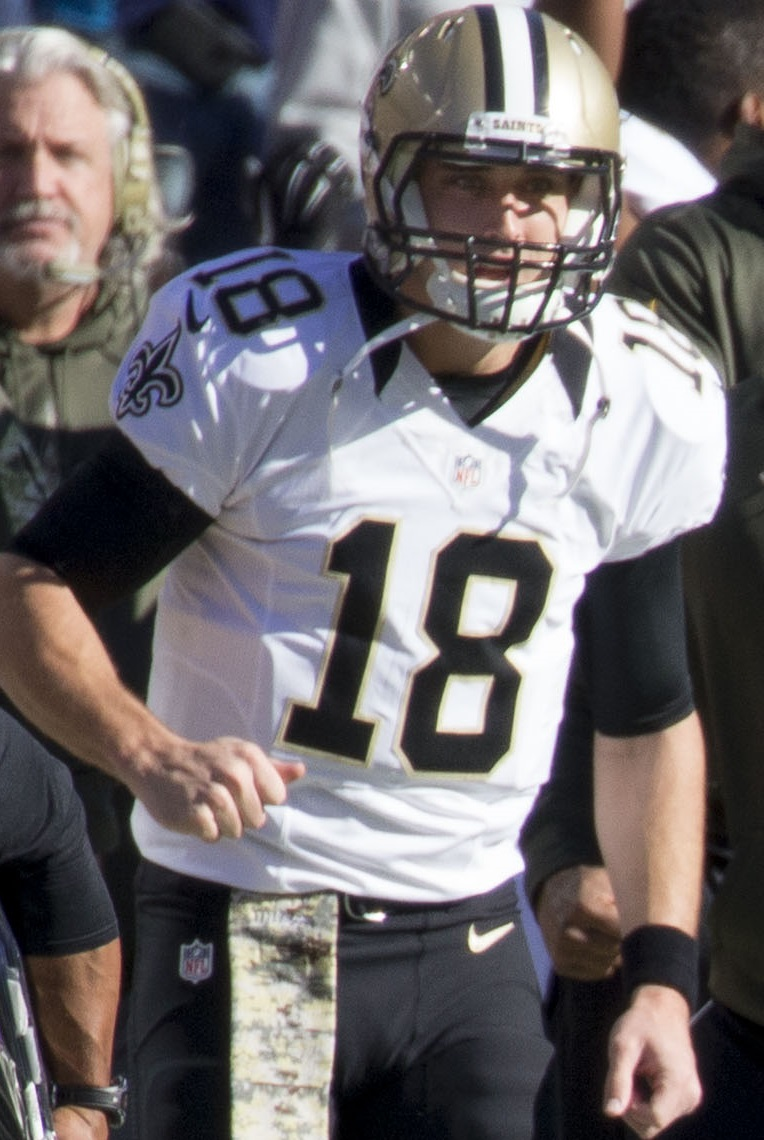
Garrett Grayson holds the Rams' career and single-season passing yards and single-season touchdowns records.

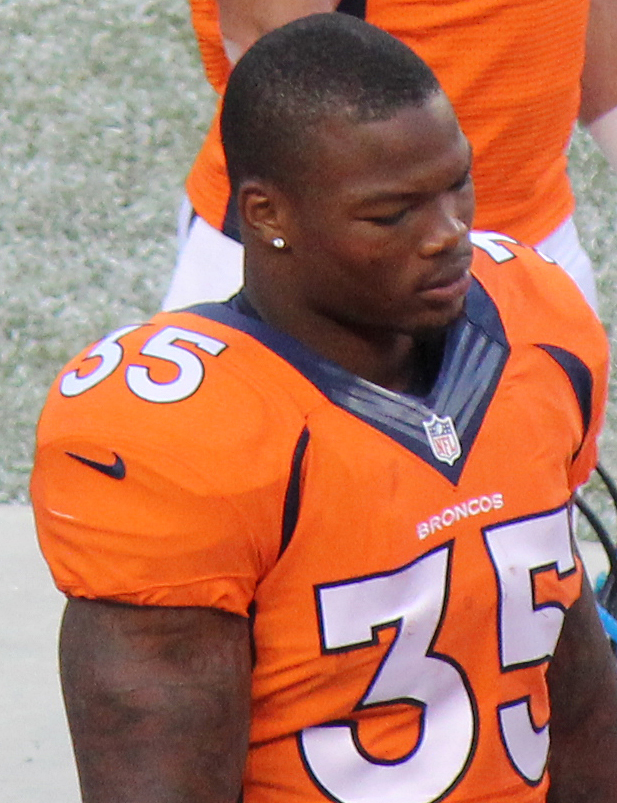
Kapri Bibbs set school single-season records in rushing yards and rushing touchdowns in 2013.

The Colorado State Rams football statistical leaders are the individual statistical leaders and school record holders of the Colorado State Rams football program in various categories, including passing, rushing, receiving, total offense, defensive stats, and kicking. Within those areas, the lists identify single-game, single-season, and career leaders. Team records encompass the best team performances in most of the same categories in single games and single seasons. The Rams represented Colorado State University in the NCAA Division I FBS Mountain West Conference (MW) through the 2025 season, and will join the Pac-12 Conference in 2026.

Although Colorado State began competing in intercollegiate football in 1893, the school's official record book considers the "modern era" to have begun in 1951. Records from before this year are often incomplete and inconsistent, and they are generally not included in these lists.

These lists are dominated by more recent players for several reasons:

- Since 1951, seasons have increased from 10 games to 11 and then 12 games in length.
- The NCAA didn't allow freshmen to play varsity football until 1972 (with the exception of the World War II years), allowing players to have four-year careers.
- Bowl games only began counting toward single-season and career statistics in 2002. The Rams have played in eight bowl games since this decision, giving many recent players an extra game to accumulate statistics.
- In 2013, the Rams not only played in a bowl, but also played a 13-game regular season. The NCAA allows teams that play at Hawaii in a given season to schedule a 13th game. The Rams chose to take advantage of this rule.
- Due to COVID-19 issues, the NCAA ruled that the 2020 season would not count against the athletic eligibility of any football player, giving everyone who played in that season the opportunity for five years of eligibility instead of the normal four.

These lists are updated through the end of the 2025 season, per the 2021 Colorado State media guide.

== Individual statistical leaders ==
=== Passing ===
==== Individual passing yards ====
Career
| Rk | Player | Yards | Years |
|---|---|---|---|
| 1 | Garrett Grayson | 9,191 | 2011 2012 2013 2014 |
| 2 | Nick Stevens | 8,550 | 2014 2015 2016 2017 |
| 3 | Kelly Stouffer | 7,142 | 1984 1985 1986 |
| 4 | Terry Nugent | 7,103 | 1980 1981 1982 1983 |
| 5 | Moses Moreno | 6,986 | 1994 1995 1996 1997 |
| 6 | Brayden Fowler-Nicolosi | 6,938 | 2022 2023 2024 2025 |
| 7 | Caleb Hanie | 6,337 | 2004 2005 2006 2007 |
| 8 | Anthoney Hill | 6,309 | 1991 1992 1993 1994 |
| 9 | Bradlee Van Pelt | 6,271 | 2001 2002 2003 |
| 10 | Justin Holland | 5,668 | 2002 2003 2004 2005 |

Single season
| Rk | Player | Yards | Year |
|---|---|---|---|
| 1 | Garrett Grayson | 4,006 | 2014 |
| 2 | Nick Stevens | 3,799 | 2017 |
| 3 | Garrett Grayson | 3,696 | 2013 |
| 4 | Brayden Fowler-Nicolosi | 3,460 | 2023 |
| 5 | Terry Nugent | 3,319 | 1983 |
| 6 | Justin Holland | 3,185 | 2005 |
| 7 | Scooter Molander | 3,168 | 1987 |
| 8 | Todd Centeio | 2,958 | 2021 |
| 9 | Kyle Lankenau | 2,934 | 2008 |
| 10 | Moses Moreno | 2,921 | 1996 |

Single game
| Rk | Player | Yards | Year | Opponent |
|---|---|---|---|---|
| 1 | K. J. Carta-Samuels | 537 | 2018 | Hawaii |
| 2 | Todd Centeio | 527 | 2021 | Hawaii |
| 3 | Brayden Fowler-Nicolosi | 462 | 2023 | Utah Tech |
| 4 | Scooter Molander | 449 | 1987 | Hawaii |
| 5 | Nick Stevens | 445 | 2016 | Idaho |
| 6 | Garrett Grayson | 434 | 2014 | Boise State |
| 7 | Terry Nugent | 434 | 1983 | New Mexico |
| 8 | Garrett Grayson | 425 | 2014 | UC Davis |
| 9 | Patrick O'Brien | 420 | 2019 | New Mexico |
| 10 | Justin Holland | 419 | 2005 | Wyoming |

==== Passing touchdowns ====
Career
| Rk | Player | TDs | Years |
|---|---|---|---|
| 1 | Nick Stevens | 70 | 2014 2015 2016 2017 |
| 2 | Garrett Grayson | 64 | 2011 2012 2013 2014 |
| 3 | Moses Moreno | 51 | 1994 1995 1996 1997 |
| 4 | Matt Newton | 42 | 1998 1999 2000 |
| 5 | Terry Nugent | 40 | 1980 1981 1982 1983 |
| 6 | Anthoney Hill | 39 | 1991 1992 1993 1994 |
| | Caleb Hanie | 39 | 2004 2005 2006 2007 |
| 8 | Bradlee Van Pelt | 38 | 2001 2002 2003 |
| | Brayden Fowler-Nicolosi | 38 | 2022 2023 2024 2025 |
| 10 | Kelly Stouffer | 36 | 1984 1985 1986 |
| | Justin Holland | 36 | 2002 2003 2004 2005 |

Single season
| Rk | Player | TDs | Year |
|---|---|---|---|
| 1 | Garrett Grayson | 32 | 2014 |
| 2 | Nick Stevens | 29 | 2017 |
| 3 | Justin Holland | 23 | 2005 |
| | Garrett Grayson | 23 | 2013 |
| 5 | Moses Moreno | 22 | 1997 |
| | Brayden Fowler-Nicolosi | 22 | 2023 |
| 7 | Nick Stevens | 21 | 2015 |
| 8 | Matt Newton | 20 | 2000 |
| 9 | Mark Driscoll | 19 | 1974 |
| | Matt Newton | 19 | 1999 |
| | Bradlee Van Pelt | 19 | 2003 |
| | Billy Farris | 19 | 2008 |
| | Nick Stevens | 19 | 2016 |

Single game
| Rk | Player | TDs | Year | Opponent |
|---|---|---|---|---|
| 1 | Mark Driscoll | 6 | 1974 | Nevada |
| 2 | Dan Graham | 5 | 1977 | Arizona |
| | Matt Newton | 5 | 2000 | Air Force |
| | Garrett Grayson | 5 | 2014 | Wyoming |
| | Nick Stevens | 5 | 2015 | Savannah State |
| | Nick Stevens | 5 | 2016 | Idaho |
| | K. J. Carta-Samuels | 5 | 2018 | Hawaii |
| | Todd Centeio | 5 | 2021 | Hawaii |
| | Hauss Hejny | 5 | 2026 | Wyoming |
| 10 | Tom Thenell | 4 | 1981 | Mississippi State |
| | Scooter Molander | 4 | 1987 | New Mexico |
| | Matt Newton | 4 | 2000 | Colorado |
| | Justin Holland | 4 | 2005 | Wyoming |
| | Grant Stucker | 4 | 2009 | Idaho |
| | Collin Hill | 4 | 2016 | San Diego State |
| | Nick Stevens | 4 | 2016 | San Diego State |
| | Collin Hill | 4 | 2019 | Western Illinois |
| | Brayden Fowler-Nicolosi | 4 | 2023 | Utah Tech |
| | Brayden Fowler-Nicolosi | 4 | 2024 | Utah State |
| | Hauss Hejny | 4 | 2026 | Southern Utah |

=== Rushing ===
==== Rushing yards ====
Career
| Rk | Player | Yards | Years |
|---|---|---|---|
| 1 | Steve Bartalo | 4,813 | 1983 1984 1985 1986 |
| 2 | Damon Washington | 3,616 | 1995 1996 1997 1998 |
| 3 | Dalyn Dawkins | 3,185 | 2015 2016 2017 |
| 4 | Ron Harris | 3,118 | 1974 1975 1976 1977 |
| 5 | Kevin McDougal | 3,067 | 1996 1997 1998 1999 |
| 6 | Lawrence McCutcheon | 2,917 | 1969 1970 1971 |
| 7 | Gartrell Johnson | 2,776 | 2004 2005 2007 2008 |
| 8 | Izzy Matthews | 2,654 | 2015 2016 2017 2018 |
| 9 | Cecil Sapp | 2,642 | 1999 2000 2001 2002 |
| 10 | Oscar Reed | 2,581 | 1965 1966 1967 |

Single season
| Rk | Player | Yards | Year |
|---|---|---|---|
| 1 | Kapri Bibbs | 1,741 | 2013 |
| 2 | Cecil Sapp | 1,601 | 2002 |
| 3 | Gartrell Johnson | 1,476 | 2008 |
| 4 | Steve Bartalo | 1,419 | 1986 |
| 5 | Dalyn Dawkins | 1,399 | 2017 |
| 6 | Steve Bartalo | 1,368 | 1985 |
| 7 | Kyle Bell | 1,288 | 2005 |
| 8 | Calvin Branch | 1,279 | 1996 |
| 9 | Dee Hart | 1,275 | 2014 |
| 10 | Kevin McDougal | 1,164 | 1999 |

Single game
| Rk | Player | Yards | Year | Opponent |
|---|---|---|---|---|
| 1 | Kapri Bibbs | 312 | 2013 | Nevada |
| 2 | Tony Alford | 310 | 1989 | Utah |
| 3 | Kapri Bibbs | 291 | 2013 | New Mexico |
| 4 | Gartrell Johnson | 285 | 2008 | Fresno State |
| 5 | Chris Nwoke | 269 | 2011 | Air Force |
| 6 | Kevin McDougal | 255 | 1997 | New Mexico |
| 7 | Marvin Kinsey Jr. | 246 | 2019 | Toledo |
| 8 | Henri Childs | 237 | 2001 | BYU |
| 9 | Chris Nwoke | 232 | 2011 | San Diego State |
| 10 | Dee Hart | 230 | 2004 | New Mexico |

==== Rushing touchdowns ====
Career
| Rk | Player | TDs | Years |
|---|---|---|---|
| 1 | Steve Bartalo | 46 | 1983 1984 1985 1986 |
| 2 | Kapri Bibbs | 31 | 2013 |
| 3 | Cecil Sapp | 29 | 1999 2000 2001 2002 |
| 4 | Kevin McDougal | 26 | 1996 1997 1998 1999 |
| | Bradlee Van Pelt | 26 | 2001 2002 2003 |
| 6 | Oscar Reed | 24 | 1965 1966 1967 |
| | Damon Washington | 24 | 1995 1996 1997 1998 |
| | Gartrell Johnson | 24 | 2004 2005 2007 2008 |
| 9 | Lawrence McCutcheon | 23 | 1969 1970 1971 |
| | E.J. Watson | 23 | 1993 1994 1995 |

Single season
| Rk | Player | TDs | Year |
|---|---|---|---|
| 1 | Kapri Bibbs | 31 | 2013 |
| 2 | Calvin Branch | 21 | 1996 |
| 3 | Steve Bartalo | 19 | 1986 |
| 4 | Cecil Sapp | 17 | 2002 |
| 5 | Dee Hart | 16 | 2014 |
| 6 | Kevin McDougal | 13 | 1997 |
| | Izzy Matthews | 13 | 2016 |
| 8 | Steve Bartalo | 12 | 1985 |
| | Gartrell Johnson | 12 | 2008 |
| 10 | Cecil Sapp | 11 | 2000 |
| | Bradlee Van Pelt | 11 | 2002 |

=== Receiving ===
==== Receptions ====
Career
| Rk | Player | Rec | Years |
|---|---|---|---|
| 1 | Rashard Higgins | 239 | 2013 2014 2015 |
| 2 | David Anderson | 223 | 2002 2003 2004 2005 |
| 3 | Greg Primus | 194 | 1989 1990 1991 1992 |
| 4 | Tory Horton | 193 | 2022 2023 2024 |
| 5 | Jeff Champine | 184 | 1980 1981 1982 1983 |
| 6 | Johnny Walker | 172 | 2004 2005 2006 2007 |
| 7 | Trey McBride | 157 | 2018 2019 2020 2021 |
| 8 | Keli McGregor | 153 | 1981 1982 1983 1984 |
| 9 | Willie Miller | 148 | 1972 1973 1974 |
| 10 | Pete Rebstock | 143 | 1998 1999 2000 2001 |

Single season
| Rk | Player | Rec | Year |
|---|---|---|---|
| 1 | Michael Gallup | 100 | 2017 |
| 2 | Rashard Higgins | 96 | 2014 |
| | Tory Horton | 96 | 2023 |
| 4 | Trey McBride | 90 | 2021 |
| 5 | David Anderson | 86 | 2005 |
| 6 | Warren Jackson | 77 | 2019 |
| 7 | Michael Gallup | 76 | 2016 |
| 8 | Rashard Higgins | 75 | 2015 |
| 9 | David Anderson | 72 | 2003 |
| 10 | Tory Horton | 71 | 2022 |

Single game
| Rk | Player | Rec | Year | Opponent |
|---|---|---|---|---|
| 1 | Tory Horton | 16 | 2023 | Colorado |
| 2 | Jeff Champine | 14 | 1983 | New Mexico |
| 3 | Michael Gallup | 13 | 2016 | Air Force |
| | Trey McBride | 13 | 2021 | South Dakota State |
| 5 | Jeff Champine | 12 | 1981 | Mississippi State |
| | Keli McGregor | 12 | 1983 | Air Force |
| | Jeff Champine | 12 | 1983 | Northern Colorado |
| | David Anderson | 12 | 2004 | BYU |
| | David Anderson | 12 | 2005 | Colorado |
| | Rashard Higgins | 12 | 2014 | Air Force |

==== Receiving yards ====
Career
| Rk | Player | Yards | Years |
|---|---|---|---|
| 1 | Rashard Higgins | 3,649 | 2013 2014 2015 |
| 2 | David Anderson | 3,634 | 2002 2003 2004 2005 |
| 3 | Greg Primus | 3,263 | 1989 1990 1991 1992 |
| 4 | Jeff Champine | 2,811 | 1980 1981 1982 1983 |
| 5 | Willie Miller | 2,735 | 1972 1973 1974 |
| 6 | Tory Horton | 2,620 | 2022 2023 2024 |
| 7 | Johnny Walker | 2,223 | 2004 2005 2006 2007 |
| 8 | Pete Rebstock | 2,185 | 1998 1999 2000 2001 |
| 9 | Paul Turner | 2,060 | 1993 1994 1995 1997 |
| 10 | Trey McBride | 2,011 | 2018 2019 2020 2021 |

Single season
| Rk | Player | Yards | Year |
|---|---|---|---|
| 1 | Rashard Higgins | 1,750 | 2014 |
| 2 | David Anderson | 1,293 | 2003 |
| 3 | Michael Gallup | 1,272 | 2016 |
| 4 | David Anderson | 1,221 | 2005 |
| 5 | Willie Miller | 1,193 | 1974 |
| 6 | Tory Horton | 1,136 | 2023 |
| 7 | Tory Horton | 1,131 | 2022 |
| 8 | Trey McBride | 1,121 | 2021 |
| 9 | Warren Jackson | 1,119 | 2019 |
| 10 | Rashaun Greer | 1,114 | 2008 |

Single game
| Rk | Player | Yards | Year | Opponent |
|---|---|---|---|---|
| 1 | Bisi Johnson | 265 | 2016 | Idaho |
| 2 | Greg Primus | 256 | 1991 | Hawaii |
| 3 | David Anderson | 232 | 2004 | BYU |
| 4 | Willie Miller | 230 | 1974 | Arizona State |
| 5 | Tory Horton | 227 | 2023 | Utah Tech |
| 6 | Jeff Champine | 219 | 1983 | Northern Colorado |
| 7 | Warren Jackson | 214 | 2019 | New Mexico |
| 8 | Michael Gallup | 213 | 2016 | Air Force |
| 9 | Rashaun Greer | 211 | 2008 | UNLV |
| 10 | David Anderson | 199 | 2003 | Air Force |

==== Receiving touchdowns ====
Career
| Rk | Player | TDs | Years |
|---|---|---|---|
| 1 | Rashard Higgins | 31 | 2013 2014 2015 |
| 2 | Jeff Champine | 21 | 1980 1981 1982 1983 |
| 3 | David Anderson | 20 | 2002 2003 2004 2005 |
| | Kory Sperry | 20 | 2004 2005 2006 2007 2008 |
| 5 | Paul Turner | 19 | 1993 1994 1995 1996 1997 |
| 6 | Willie Miller | 18 | 1972 1973 1974 |
| 7 | Mark R. Bell | 17 | 1975 1976 1977 1978 |
| | Greg Primus | 17 | 1989 1990 1991 1992 |
| | Tory Horton | 17 | 2022 2023 2024 |
| 10 | Dion Morton | 15 | 2006 2007 2008 2009 |

Single season
| Rk | Player | TDs | Year |
|---|---|---|---|
| 1 | Rashard Higgins | 17 | 2014 |
| 2 | Michael Gallup | 14 | 2016 |
| 3 | Jeff Champine | 10 | 1981 |
| | Dion Morton | 10 | 2008 |
| 5 | Willie Miller | 9 | 1974 |
| | Mark R. Bell | 9 | 1977 |
| | Paul Turner | 9 | 1995 |
| | David Anderson | 9 | 2003 |
| 9 | Greg Primus | 8 | 1991 |
| | David Anderson | 8 | 2005 |
| | Rashard Higgins | 8 | 2015 |
| | Warren Jackson | 8 | 2019 |
| | Tory Horton | 8 | 2022 |
| | Tory Horton | 8 | 2023 |

Single game
| Rk | Player | TDs | Year | Opponent |
|---|---|---|---|---|
| 1 | Rashard Higgins | 4 | 2014 | Tulsa |
| 2 | Willie Miller | 3 | 1974 | Nevada |
| | Cecil Stockdale | 3 | 1979 | Wyoming |
| | Greg Primus | 3 | 1992 | UTEP |
| | Dustin Osborn | 3 | 2005 | Minnesota |
| | Kory Sperry | 3 | 2007 | Colorado |
| | Kory Sperry | 3 | 2008 | San Diego State |
| | Dion Morton | 3 | 2008 | Wyoming |
| | Rashard Higgins | 3 | 2015 | UNLV |
| | Michael Gallup | 3 | 2016 | San Diego State |
| | Michael Gallup | 3 | 2016 | Idaho |
| | Tory Horton | 3 | 2022 | Middle Tennessee |
| | Tory Horton | 3 | 2023 | Utah Tech |
| | RJ Vick | 3 | 2026 | Wyoming |

=== Total offense ===
Total offense is the sum of passing and rushing statistics. It does not include receiving or returns.

==== Total offense yards ====
Career
| Rk | Player | Yards | Years |
|---|---|---|---|
| 1 | Garrett Grayson | 9,512 | 2011 2012 2013 2014 |
| 2 | Bradlee Van Pelt | 8,579 | 2001 2002 2003 |
| 3 | Anthoney Hill | 7,428 | 1991 1992 1993 1994 |
| 4 | Brayden Fowler-Nicolosi | 6,997 | 2022 2023 2024 2025 |
| 5 | Moses Moreno | 6,728 | 1994 1995 1996 1997 |
| 6 | Kelly Stouffer | 6,666 | 1984 1985 1986 |
| 7 | Caleb Hanie | 6,523 | 2004 2005 2006 2007 |
| 8 | Terry Nugent | 6,298 | 1980 1981 1982 1983 |
| 9 | Justin Holland | 5,377 | 2002 2003 2004 2005 |
| 10 | Matt Newton | 5,376 | 1997 1998 1999 2000 |

Single season
| Rk | Player | Yards | Year |
|---|---|---|---|
| 1 | Garrett Grayson | 3,960 | 2014 |
| 2 | Garrett Grayson | 3,815 | 2013 |
| 3 | Bradlee Van Pelt | 3,754 | 2003 |
| 4 | Brayden Fowler-Nicolosi | 3,441 | 2023 |
| 5 | Todd Centeio | 3,397 | 2021 |
| 6 | Terry Nugent | 3,043 | 1983 |
| 7 | Justin Holland | 3,011 | 2005 |
| 8 | Anthoney Hill | 2,999 | 1994 |
| 9 | Moses Moreno | 2,903 | 1996 |
| 10 | Billy Farris | 2,900 | 2008 |

Single game
| Rk | Player | Yards | Year | Opponent |
|---|---|---|---|---|
| 1 | K. J. Carta-Samuels | 562 | 2018 | Hawaii |
| 2 | Todd Centeio | 544 | 2021 | Hawaii |
| 3 | Brayden Fowler-Nicolosi | 489 | 2023 | Utah Tech |
| 4 | Nick Stevens | 450 | 2016 | Idaho |
| 5 | Garrett Grayson | 445 | 2013 | Boise State |
| 6 | Garrett Grayson | 431 | 2014 | UC Davis |
| 7 | Garrett Grayson | 428 | 2014 | Boise State |
| 8 | Garrett Grayson | 421 | 2013 | Air Force |
| 9 | Hauss Hejny | 418 | 2026 | San Diego State |
| 10 | Bradlee Van Pelt | 416 | 2003 | Colorado |

==== Touchdowns responsible for ====
"Touchdowns responsible for" is the official NCAA term for combined rushing and passing touchdowns. It does not include receiving or returns.

Career
| Rk | Player | TDs | Years |
|---|---|---|---|
| 1 | Garrett Grayson | 68 | 2011 2012 2013 2014 |
| 2 | Bradlee Van Pelt | 64 | 2001 2002 2003 |
| 3 | Moses Moreno | 55 | 1994 1995 1996 1997 |
| 4 | Anthoney Hill | 52 | 1991 1992 1993 1994 |
| 5 | Matt Newton | 47 | 1997 1998 1999 2000 |
| | Caleb Hanie | 47 | 2004 2005 2006 2007 |
| 7 | Terry Nugent | 46 | 1980 1981 1982 1983 |
| | Steve Bartalo | 46 | 1983 1984 1985 1986 |
| | Nick Stevens | 46 | 2014 2015 2016 |
| 10 | Brayden Fowler-Nicolosi | 44 | 2022 2023 2024 2025 |

Single season
| Rk | Player | TDs | Year |
|---|---|---|---|
| 1 | Garrett Grayson | 32 | 2014 |
| 2 | Kapri Bibbs | 31 | 2013 |

=== Defense ===
==== Interceptions ====
Career
| Rk | Player | Ints | Years |
|---|---|---|---|
| 1 | Ray Jackson | 20 | 1992 1993 1994 1995 |
| 2 | Selwyn Jones | 15 | 1988 1989 1990 1991 |
| 3 | Gary Glick | 14 | 1953 1954 1955 |
| | Bill Kishman | 14 | 1966 1967 1968 |
| | Greg Myers | 14 | 1992 1993 1994 1995 |
| 6 | Ron Cortell | 13 | 1985 1986 1987 1988 |
| | Myron Terry | 13 | 1995 1996 1997 1998 |
| 8 | Jim King | 12 | 1982 1983 1984 1985 1986 |
| | Erik Olson | 12 | 1996 1997 1998 1999 |

Single season
| Rk | Player | Ints | Year |
|---|---|---|---|
| 1 | Gary Glick | 8 | 1954 |
| 2 | Cliff Featherstone | 7 | 1977 |
| | Jim King | 7 | 1986 |
| | Ray Jackson | 7 | 1994 |

==== Tackles ====
Career
| Rk | Player | Tackles | Years |
|---|---|---|---|
| 1 | Willie Taylor | 433 | 1995 1996 1997 1998 |
| 2 | Jeff Harper | 423 | 1980 1981 1982 1983 |
| 3 | Ron Cortell | 402 | 1985 1986 1987 1988 |
| 4 | Nate Kvamme | 385 | 1995 1996 1997 1998 |
| 5 | Jack Howell | 371 | 2021 2022 2023 2024 |
| 6 | Rick Crowell | 370 | 1996 1997 1998 1999 2000 |
| 7 | Max Morgan | 348 | 2011 2012 2013 2014 |
| 8 | Aaron Davis | 345 | 2011 2012 2013 2014 |
| 9 | Brian Schneider | 339 | 1990 1991 1992 1993 |
| 10 | Kevin McLain | 336 | 1974 1975 |

Single season
| Rk | Player | Tackles | Year |
|---|---|---|---|
| 1 | Kevin McLain | 198 | 1974 |
| 2 | Eric Tippeconnic | 185 | 1990 |
| 3 | Jeff Harper | 160 | 1982 |
| 4 | Steve Krum | 154 | 1976 |
| 5 | Owen Long | 151 | 2025 |
| 6 | Dale Carr | 147 | 1986 |
| 7 | Willie Taylor | 146 | 1996 |
| 8 | Gary Thompson | 145 | 1988 |
| 9 | Kevin McLain | 138 | 1975 |
| 10 | Brian Schneider | 136 | 1992 |

Single game
| Rk | Player | Tackles | Year | Opponent |
|---|---|---|---|---|
| 1 | Jeff Harper | 32 | 1982 | Wyoming |
| 2 | Eric Tippeconnic | 27 | 1984 | Arkansas |
| 3 | Kevin McLain | 23 | 1975 | BYU |
| | Karl Ballard | 23 | 1989 | Air Force |
| 5 | Gary Thompson | 22 | 1990 | Colorado |
| | Otis Hamilton | 22 | 1990 | Arkansas |
| | Kevin McDougal | 22 | 1990 | Nebraska |
| 8 | Dale Carr | 21 | 1995 | Arizona State |
| | Andy Byrne | 21 | 1996 | Arkansas |

==== Sacks ====
Career
| Rk | Player | Sacks | Years |
|---|---|---|---|
| 1 | Clark Haggans | 33.0 | 1996 1997 1998 1999 |
| 2 | Mohamed Kamara | 30.5 | 2019 2020 2021 2022 2023 |
| 3 | Brady Smith | 28.5 | 1992 1993 1994 1995 |
| 4 | Mike Bell | 25.0 | 1975 1976 1977 1978 |
| 5 | Cory James | 24.0 | 2012 2013 2014 2015 |
| 6 | Adrian Ross | 22.5 | 1994 1995 1996 1997 |
| 7 | Joey Porter | 20.0 | 1995 1996 1997 1998 |
| 8 | Steve Hodge | 19.0 | 1991 1992 1993 1994 |
| 9 | Eric Shaller | 18.0 | 1986 1987 1988 1989 1990 |
| | Robert Chirico | 18.0 | 1987 1988 1989 1990 |
| | Shaquil Barrett | 18.0 | 2010 2011 2012 2013 |

Single season
| Rk | Player | Sacks | Year |
|---|---|---|---|
| 1 | Brady Smith | 16.0 | 1995 |
| 2 | Joey Porter | 14.0 | 1998 |
| 3 | Mohamed Kamara | 13.0 | 2023 |
| 4 | Clark Haggans | 12.0 | 1997 |
| | Shaquil Barrett | 12.0 | 2013 |
| 6 | Clint Hjelm | 11.0 | 1987 |
| 7 | Scott Patchan | 10.5 | 2021 |
| 8 | Mike Bell | 10.0 | 1977 |
| | Andy Poremba | 10.0 | 1982 |
| | Keith Pitts | 10.0 | 1983 |
| | Adrian Ross | 10.0 | 1997 |
| | Clark Haggans | 10.0 | 1998 |
| | Nordly Capi | 10.0 | 2011 |

Single game
| Rk | Player | Sacks | Year | Opponent |
|---|---|---|---|---|
| 1 | Guy Miller | 4.5 | 2010 | UNLV |
| 2 | Mike Bell | 4.0 | 1977 | Arizona State |
| | Brady Smith | 4.0 | 1995 | BYU |
| 4 | Nordly Capi | 3.5 | 2011 | New Mexico |
| | Joe Kawulok | 3.5 | 2014 | Tulsa |

=== Kicking ===
==== Field goals made ====
Career
| Rk | Player | FGs | Years |
|---|---|---|---|
| 1 | Wyatt Bryan | 53 | 2015 2016 2017 2018 |
| 2 | Jeff Babcock | 51 | 2002 2003 2004 |
| 3 | Mike Brown | 45 | 1988 1989 1990 1991 |
| | Jason Smith | 45 | 2005 2006 2007 2008 |
| 5 | Steve DeLine | 42 | 1984 1985 1986 |
| | Jared Roberts | 42 | 2012 2013 2014 |
| 7 | Jon Poole | 38 | 1980 1981 1982 1983 |
| 8 | Ben DeLine | 36 | 2008 2009 2010 2011 |
| 9 | Cayden Camper | 32 | 2019 2021 2022 |
| 10 | Jordan Noyes | 29 | 2023 2024 |

Single season
| Rk | Player | FGs | Year |
|---|---|---|---|
| 1 | Cayden Camper | 25 | 2021 |
| 2 | Jeff Babcock | 24 | 2002 |
| 3 | Derek Franz | 21 | 1998 |
| | Jared Roberts | 21 | 2013 |
| 5 | Steve DeLine | 19 | 1986 |
| 6 | Jon Poole | 16 | 1980 |
| | Jason Smith | 16 | 2007 |
| | Ben DeLine | 16 | 2010 |
| | Wyatt Bryan | 16 | 2015 |
| 10 | Wyatt Bryan | 15 | 2017 |
| | Jordan Noyes | 15 | 2023 |

==== Field goal percentage ====
Career
| Rk | Player | FG% | Years |
|---|---|---|---|
| 1 | Jared Roberts | 77.8% | 2012 2013 2014 |
| 2 | Jason Smith | 77.6% | 2005 2006 2007 2008 |
| 3 | Michael Boyle | 76.9% | 2022 |
| 4 | Derek Franz | 75.7% | 1995 1996 1997 1998 |
| 5 | Jeff Babcock | 75.0% | 2002 2003 2004 |
| 6 | Jordan Noyes | 74.4% | 2023 2024 |
| 7 | Wyatt Bryan | 73.6% | 2015 2016 2017 2018 |
| 8 | Steve DeLine | 72.4% | 1984 1985 1986 |
| 9 | Ben DeLine | 70.6% | 2008 2009 2010 2011 |

Single season
| Rk | Player | FG% | Year |
|---|---|---|---|
| 1 | Jason Smith | 92.3% | 2008 |
| 2 | Jason Smith | 90.0% | 2005 |
| | Jared Roberts | 90.0% | 2012 |
| 4 | Jared Roberts | 87.5% | 2013 |
| 5 | Wyatt Bryan | 83.3% | 2017 |
| 6 | Jeff Babcock | 82.4% | 2004 |
| 7 | Derek Franz | 80.8% | 1998 |
| | Jason Smith | 80.0% | 2007 |

== Team school records ==
Updated as of 2021, per the 2021 Colorado State football media guide.

=== Longest plays ===
==== Offense ====
Longest passing play
| Rk | Quarterback | Receiver | Yards | Season | Opposing team |
|---|---|---|---|---|---|
| 1 | Jack Graham | Ron Harris | 94 | 1977 | Northern Colorado |
| 2 | Patrick O'Brien | Warren Jackson | 87 | 2019 | New Mexico |
| | Kevin Verdugo | Greg Primus | 87 | 1990 | UTEP |
| 4 | Bradlee Van Pelt | David Anderson | 86 | 2003 | Miami (OH) |
| 5 | Brayden Fowler-Nicolosi | Caleb Goodie | 85 | 2024 | Air Force |
| | Bradlee Van Pelt | Joel Dreessen | 85 | 2003 | California |
| | Moses Moreno | Geoff Turner | 85 | 1996 | Oregon |
| | Moses Moreno | Paul Turner | 85 | 1995 | UTEP |
| 9 | Caleb Hanie | Dion Morton | 83 | 2007 | UNLV |
| | Caleb Hanie | Dion Morton | 83 | 2006 | Air Force |

Longest rushing play
| Rk | Rusher | Yards | Season | Opposing team |
|---|---|---|---|---|
| 1 | Cecil Sapp | 89 | 2000 | Air Force |
| 2 | Wayne Schneider | 86 | 1958 | BYU |
| 3 | Kapri Bibbs | 85 | 2013 | Nevada |
| 4 | Wayne Schneider | 83 | 1958 | Colorado |
| | Eddie Hanna | 83 | 1948 | Denver |
| 6 | Mel Brown | 80 | 2026 | Southern Utah |
| | Duan Ruff | 80 | 1998 | Tulsa |
| | Damon Washington | 80 | 1996 | Chattanooga |
| | Tony Alford | 80 | 1989 | Hawaii |
| | Leonice Brown | 80 | 1992 | LSU |
| | Jack Christiansen | 80 | 1950 | Denver |

==== Defense ====
Longest interception return
| Rk | Player | Yards | Season | Opposing team |
|---|---|---|---|---|
| 1 | Ray Jackson | 100 | 1993 | UTEP |
| 2 | Zac Bryson | 99 | 2007 | UNLV |
| 3 | Nick Oppenneer | 97 | 2009 | New Mexico |
| 4 | Ray Jackson | 92 | 1995 | Utah State |
| 5 | Orbry Chamblee | 90 | 1979 | UNLV |
| 6 | Albert White | 88 | 1931 | Wyoming |
| 7 | Glenn Davis | 85 | 1928 | Northern Colorado |
| 8 | Andre Strode | 84 | 1993 | BYU |
| 9 | George Polka | 78 | 1967 | Emporia State |
| 10 | DeAndre Elliott | 76 | 2012 | Hawaii |

Longest fumble recovery touchdown
| Rk | Player | Yards | Season | Opposing team |
|---|---|---|---|---|
| 1 | Mychal Sisson | 88 | 2010 | San Diego State |
| 2 | Sean Moran | 77 | 1994 | Arizona |
| 3 | Max Morgan | 73 | 2013 | Hawaii |
| 4 | Mohamed Kamara | 54 | 2019 | Air Force |
| | Rhett Nelson | 54 | 2002 | New Mexico |
| 6 | Jason Gallimore | 52 | 2000 | Wyoming |
| 7 | Mukendi Wa-Kalonji | 50 | 2022 | Nevada |
| 8 | Matt Rupp | 48 | 2007 | Air Force |
| 9 | Paul Tangelo | 36 | 2025 | Fresno State |
| 10 | Shaq Bell | 30 | 2012 | UNLV |
