= List of Colorado State Rams in the NFL draft =

This is a list of Colorado State Rams football players in the NFL draft.

== Key ==
B	Back	K	Kicker	NT	Nose tackle
C	Center	LB	Linebacker	FB	Fullback
DB	Defensive back	P	Punter	HB	Halfback
DE	Defensive end	QB	Quarterback	WR	Wide receiver
DT	Defensive tackle	RB	Running back	G	Guard
E	End	T	Offensive tackle	TE	Tight end

== Selections ==
Year	Round	Pick	Player	Team	Position
1943	18	161	Chet Maeda	Detroit Lions	B
1943	24	223	Lou Dent	Brooklyn Dodgers	B
1944	8	70	Roy Clay	New York Giants	B
1949	19	188	Bob Hainlen	Washington Redskins	B
1950	2	27	Thurman McGraw	Detroit Lions	T
1951	6	67	Dale Dodrill	Pittsburgh Steelers	G
1951	6	69	Jack Christiansen	Detroit Lions	DB
1952	22	261	Jim David	Detroit Lions	E
1953	26	308	Harvey Achziger	Philadelphia Eagles	T
1954	15	181	Kirk Hinderlider	Detroit Lions	E
1954	30	350	Alex Burl	Chicago Cardinals	B
1955	23	272	Jerry Callahan	New York Giants	B
1956	1	1	Gary Glick	Pittsburgh Steelers	QB
1956	7	75	Larry Barnes	San Francisco 49ers	B
1956	10	112	Jerry Zaleski	San Francisco 49ers	B
1959	12	136	Ron Stehouwer	Detroit Lions	T
1959	23	266	Freddie Glick	Chicago Cardinals	DB
1960	11	124	Jim Eifrid	Washington Redskins	C
1960	14	162	Brady Keys	Pittsburgh Steelers	DB
1961	18	248	Kay McFarland	San Francisco 49ers	RB
1961	20	274	Leo Reed	St. Louis Cardinals	E
1964	15	199	Dick Evers	Washington Redskins	T
1968	3	61	Jon Henderson	Pittsburgh Steelers	DB
1968	7	167	Oscar Reed	Minnesota Vikings	WR
1968	8	204	Al Lavan	Philadelphia Eagles	DB
1968	10	248	Mike Tomasini	Atlanta Falcons	DT
1968	15	391	Jim Oliver	Detroit Lions	RB
1968	17	451	Gene Layton	Chicago Bears	DT
1969	5	114	Bill Kishman	Washington Redskins	DB
1969	6	147	Terry Swarn	San Diego Chargers	WR
1969	16	414	Floyd Kerr	Dallas Cowboys	DB
1970	11	280	Earlie Thomas	New York Jets	DB
1971	11	281	Phil Webb	Detroit Lions	DB
1972	3	70	Lawrence McCutcheon	Los Angeles Rams	RB
1972	3	73	Jim White	New England Patriots	DE
1973	4	92	Perry Smith	Oakland Raiders	DB
1973	11	282	Gerald Caswell	Dallas Cowboys	G
1974	9	233	Jimmie Kennedy	Washington Redskins	TE
1974	11	269	Greg Battle	San Francisco 49ers	DB
1975	1	25	Mark Mullaney	Minnesota Vikings	DE
1975	2	27	Al Simpson	New York Giants	T
1975	7	157	Kim Jones	Baltimore Colts	RB
1975	12	302	Willie Miller	Houston Oilers	WR
1975	14	361	John Graham	Miami Dolphins	QB
1975	16	407	Pete Clark	Dallas Cowboys	TE
1976	1	26	Kevin McLain	Los Angeles Rams	LB
1976	8	220	Jerome Dove	Oakland Raiders	DB
1976	11	292	Melvin Washington	Tampa Bay Buccaneers	DB
1976	13	368	Dan O'Rourke	Houston Oilers	WR
1976	13	372	Gary Paulson	Minnesota Vikings	DE
1976	13	374	Mark Driscoll	Dallas Cowboys	QB
1977	3	77	Keith King	San Diego Chargers	DB
1978	2	40	Al Baker	Detroit Lions	DE
1978	7	180	Cliff Featherstone	San Diego Chargers	DB
1978	8	207	Mark Nichols	Oakland Raiders	DE
1978	9	240	Mike Deutsch	Minnesota Vikings	P
1978	11	299	Ron Harris	Minnesota Vikings	RB
1979	1	2	Mike Bell	Kansas City Chiefs	DE
1979	4	102	Mark Bell	Seattle Seahawks	TE
1979	5	130	Mark Bell	St. Louis Cardinals	WR
1979	11	292	Bill Leer	Atlanta Falcons	C
1980	5	129	Keith Lee	Buffalo Bills	DB
1980	8	198	Dupree Branch	St. Louis Cardinals	DB
1981	6	151	Alvin Lewis	Denver Broncos	RB
1981	10	270	Larry Jones	Houston Oilers	RB
1984	5	130	Kevin Call	Indianapolis Colts	T
1984	6	158	Terry Nugent	Cleveland Browns	QB
1985	4	110	Keli McGregor	Denver Broncos	TE
1985	12	321	Harper LeBel	Kansas City Chiefs	C
1986	3	66	Terry Unrein	San Diego Chargers	DE
1987	1	6	Kelly Stouffer	Seattle Seahawks	QB
1987	6	143	Steve Bartalo	Tampa Bay Buccaneers	RB
1987	7	189	Steve DeLine	San Francisco 49ers	K
1992	7	177	Selwyn Jones	Cleveland Browns	DB
1996	3	70	Brady Smith	New Orleans Saints	DE
1996	4	120	Sean Moran	Buffalo Bills	DE
1996	5	144	Greg Myers	Cincinnati Bengals	DB
1996	5	156	Ray Jackson	Buffalo Bills	DB
1997	6	172	Calvin Branch	Oakland Raiders	RB
1998	7	232	Moses Moreno	Chicago Bears	QB
1999	3	73	Joey Porter	Pittsburgh Steelers	DE
1999	3	88	Anthony Cesario	Jacksonville Jaguars	G
1999	5	160	Jason Craft	Jacksonville Jaguars	DB
1999	6	186	Darran Hall	Houston Oilers	WR
2000	5	137	Clark Haggans	Pittsburgh Steelers	LB
2000	7	236	Erik Olson	Jacksonville Jaguars	DB
2001	4	117	John Howell	Tampa Bay Buccaneers	DB
2001	6	188	Rick Crowell	Miami Dolphins	LB
2004	6	192	Dexter Wynn	Philadelphia Eagles	DB
2004	7	250	Bradlee Van Pelt	Denver Broncos	QB
2004	7	255	Andre Sommersell	Oakland Raiders	LB
2005	6	198	Joel Dreessen	New York Jets	TE
2006	7	251	David Anderson	Houston Texans	WR
2007	5	171	Clint Oldenburg	New England Patriots	T
2009	4	134	Gartrell Johnson	San Diego Chargers	RB
2010	6	187	Shelley Smith	Houston Texans	G
2014	2	43	Weston Richburg	New York Giants	C
2014	3	99	Crockett Gillmore	Baltimore Ravens	TE
2015	2	59	Ty Sambrailo	Denver Broncos	T
2015	3	75	Garrett Grayson	New Orleans Saints	QB
2016	5	172	Rashard Higgins	Cleveland Browns	WR
2016	6	194	Cory James	Oakland Raiders	LB
2018	3	81	Michael Gallup	Dallas Cowboys	WR
2019	7	247	Bisi Johnson	Minnesota Vikings	WR
2022	2	55	Trey McBride	Arizona Cardinals	TE
2024	5	158	Mohamed Kamara	Miami Dolphins	DE
2025	5	166	Tory Horton	Seattle Seahawks	WR

== Notable undrafted players ==
The following players were not selected in their respective NFL draft, but signed to a team as an undrafted free agent (UDFA) following the draft.

Year	Player	Team	Position
1966	Sam Brunelli	Denver Broncos	Tackle
1966	Lonnie Wright	Denver Broncos	Safety
1967	Randy Beverly	New York Jets	Cornerback
1974	Louie Walker	Dallas Cowboys	Linebacker
1975	Bill Larson	San Francisco 49ers	Tight end
1975	Jim Opperman	Philadelphia Eagles	Linebacker
1975	Greg Stemrick	Houston Oilers	Cornerback
1978	Harry Washington	Minnesota Vikings	Wide receiver
1980	Rick Dennison	Buffalo Bills	Linebacker
1988	Sanjay Beach	Dallas Cowboys	Wide receiver
1988	Dewey Dorough	Green Bay Packers	Wide receiver
1989	Scooter Molander	Cleveland Browns	Quarterback
1993	David Frisch	Cincinnati Bengals	Tight end
1993	John Ivlow	Chicago Bears	Running back
1993	Greg Primus	Denver Broncos	Wide receiver
1997	Mitch Palmer	Carolina Panthers	Linebacker
1998	Adrian Ross	Cincinnati Bengals	Linebacker
1999	Damon Washington	Chicago Bears	Running back
2000	Kevin McDougal	Indianapolis Colts	Running back
2000	Blaine Saipaia	New Orleans Saints	Tackle
2000	Maugaula Tuitele	New England Patriots	Linebacker
2003	Rhett Nelson	Arizona Cardinals	Defensive back
2003	Morgan Pears	Miami Dolphins	Tackle
2003	Cecil Sapp	Denver Broncos	Running back
2004	Bryan Save	Indianapolis Colts	Defensive tackle
2005	Erik Pears	Denver Broncos	Guard
2006	Mike Brisiel	Houston Texans	Guard
2008	Caleb Hanie	Chicago Bears	Quarterback
2009	Kory Sperry	San Diego Chargers	Tight end
2014	Shaquil Barrett	Denver Broncos	Linebacker
2014	Kapri Bibbs	Denver Broncos	Running back
2018	Dalyn Dawkins	Tennessee Titans	Running back
2018	Trent Sieg	Oakland Raiders	Long snapper
2018	Nick Stevens	Denver Broncos	Quarterback
2019	Preston Williams	Miami Dolphins	Wide receiver
2022	Ryan Stonehouse	Tennessee Titans	Punter
2024	Chigozie Anusiem	Washington Commanders	Cornerback
2024	Dallin Holker	New Orleans Saints	Tight end
2025	Dom Jones	Cleveland Browns	Cornerback
2025	Drew Moss	San Francisco 49ers	Offensive lineman
