= 1982 Hall of Fame Classic =

Air Force Falcons	Vanderbilt Commodores
(7–5)	(8–3)
36	28
Head coach: Ken Hatfield	Head coach: George MacIntyre
	1	2	3	4	Total
Air Force	7	7	3	19	36
Vanderbilt	7	14	7	0	28
- Date: December 31, 1982
- Season: 1982
- Stadium: Legion Field
- Location: Birmingham, Alabama
- MVP: Whit Taylor (QB, Vanderbilt); Carl Dieudonne (DE, Air Force)
- Favorite: Vanderbilt by 9½ points
- Attendance: 75,114
- Payout: US$400,000

United States TV coverage
- Network: Mizlou

The 1982 Hall of Fame Classic, part of the 1982–83 bowl game season, was the sixth annual contest and took place on December 31 at Legion Field in Birmingham, Alabama. The competing teams were the Vanderbilt Commodores, representing the Southeastern Conference (SEC), and the Air Force Falcons, representing the Western Athletic Conference (WAC). Down 28–17 entering the fourth quarter, 19 unanswered points gave Air Force the 36–28 come-from-behind victory.

== Background ==
Air Force finished the regular season at 7–5, with losses to Tulsa, Texas Tech, New Mexico, Colorado State, and Hawaii. They accepted an invitation to play in the Hall of Fame Classic against Vanderbilt following their upset of Notre Dame on November 20, then lost at Hawaii the following week. It was the fourth bowl appearance for Air Force, the first in twelve years, and their first in the Hall of Fame Classic. Stanford was the original selection, but became ineligible for bowl participation following their last-play loss to rival Cal, which dropped their record to 5–6.

The 1982 Vanderbilt squad finished the regular season 8–3. The Commodores lost to North Carolina, Alabama, and Georgia. They accepted an invitation to play in the Hall of Fame Classic following their 27–16 victory over Tennessee–Chattanooga on November 20. It was the third bowl appearance for Vanderbilt, the first in eight years, and their first in the Hall of Fame Classic.

== Game summary ==
Vanderbilt got on the scoreboard first after Whit Taylor threw a 28-yard touchdown pass to Norman Jordan to give the Commodores a 7–0 lead. Air Force responded with a one-yard Marty Louthan touchdown later in the first and then on a 19-yard Mike Brown run early in the second to take a 14–7 lead. The Commodores then scored a pair of second-quarter touchdown passes by Taylor to take a 21–14 halftime lead.

In the third, the Falcons scored on a 21-yard Sean Pavlich field goal and the Commodores on Jordan's third touchdown reception of the evening to give Vanderbilt a 28–17 lead entering the fourth quarter. In the fourth, Air Force scored 19 unanswered points on a trio of touchdown runs to secure the 36–28 victory. For their performances, Vanderbilt quarterback Whit Taylor and Air Force defensive end Carl Dieudonne were named co-MVPs of the game.

Scoring summary

Quarter	Time	Drive			Team	Scoring information	Score	
Quarter	Time	Plays	Yards	TOP	Team	Scoring information	Air Force	Vanderbilt
1	11:06	7	75		Vanderbilt	Norman Jordan 28-yard touchdown reception from Whit Taylor, Richard Anderson kick good	0	7
1	1:16	8	37		Air Force	Marty Louthan 1-yard touchdown run, Sean Pavlich kick good	7	7
2	9:04	13	80		Air Force	Mike Brown 19-yard touchdown run, Sean Pavlich kick good	14	7
2	7:21	5	63		Vanderbilt	Phil Roach 15-yard touchdown reception from Whit Taylor, Richard Anderson kick good	14	14
2	0:46	4	50		Vanderbilt	Norman Jordan 4-yard touchdown reception from Whit Taylor, Richard Anderson kick good	14	21
3					Air Force	21-yard field goal by Sean Pavlich	17	21
3					Vanderbilt	Norman Jordan 4-yard touchdown reception from Whit Taylor, Richard Anderson kick good	17	28
4		10	92		Air Force	Ted Sundquist 3-yard touchdown run, 2-point pass failed	23	28
4					Air Force	John Kershner 3-yard touchdown run, 2-point pass failed	29	28
4					Air Force	Marty Louthan 46-yard touchdown run, Sean Pavlich kick good	36	28
"TOP" = time of possession. For other American football terms, see Glossary of American football.							36	28
