= 1982 BYU Cougars football team =

American college football season

1982 BYU Cougars football

WAC champion

Holiday Bowl, L 17–47 vs. Ohio State
- Conference: Western Athletic Conference
- Record: 8–4 (7–1 WAC)
- Head coach: LaVell Edwards (11th season)
- Offensive coordinator: Roger French (2nd season)
- Offensive scheme: West Coast
- Defensive coordinator: Dick Felt (8th season)
- Base defense: 4–3
- Home stadium: Cougar Stadium

1982 Western Athletic Conference football standings
| | Conf. | | | | | Overall |
| Team | W | | L | | T | W | | L | | T |
|---|---|---|---|---|---|---|---|---|---|---|
| BYU $ | 7 | – | 1 | – | 0 | 8 | – | 4 | – | 0 |
| New Mexico | 6 | – | 1 | – | 0 | 10 | – | 1 | – | 0 |
| Air Force | 4 | – | 3 | – | 0 | 8 | – | 5 | – | 0 |
| San Diego State | 4 | – | 3 | – | 0 | 7 | – | 5 | – | 0 |
| Hawaii | 4 | – | 4 | – | 0 | 6 | – | 5 | – | 0 |
| Colorado State | 3 | – | 5 | – | 0 | 4 | – | 7 | – | 0 |
| Utah | 2 | – | 4 | – | 0 | 5 | – | 6 | – | 0 |
| Wyoming | 2 | – | 6 | – | 0 | 5 | – | 7 | – | 0 |
| UTEP | 1 | – | 6 | – | 0 | 2 | – | 10 | – | 0 |
$ – Conference champion

The 1982 BYU Cougars football team represented the Brigham Young University (BYU) in the 1982 NCAA Division I-A football season as a member of the Western Athletic Conference (WAC). The team was led by head coach LaVell Edwards, in his eleventh year, and played their home games at Cougar Stadium in Provo, Utah. They finished the season with a record of eight wins and four losses (8–4, 7–1 WAC), as WAC Champions and with a loss against Ohio State in the Holiday Bowl.

== Schedule ==
| Date | Time | Opponent | Site | Result | Attendance | Source |
|---|---|---|---|---|---|---|
| September 2 | | at UNLV* | Las Vegas Silver Bowl; Whitney, NV | W 27–0 | 26,769 | |
| September 11 | | at No. 6 Georgia* | Sanford Stadium; Athens, GA | L 14–17 | 80,207 | |
| September 25 | 1:30 p.m. | Air Force | Cougar Stadium; Provo, UT | L 38–39 | 64,253 | |
| October 2 | | at UTEP | Sun Bowl; El Paso, TX | W 51–3 | 34,108 | |
| October 9 | | at New Mexico | University Stadium; Albuquerque, NM | W 40–12 | 31,002 | |
| October 16 | | Hawaii^{†} | Cougar Stadium; Provo, UT | W 39–25 | 65,172 | |
| October 23 | | Colorado State | Cougar Stadium; Provo, UT | W 34–18 | 64,739 | |
| October 30 | | at Utah State* | Romney Stadium; Logan, UT (rivalry) | L 17–20 | 25,688 | |
| November 6 | | Wyoming | Cougar Stadium; Provo, UT | W 23–13 | 64,819 | |
| November 13 | | San Diego State | Cougar Stadium; Provo, UT | W 58–8 | 64,471 | |
| November 20 | | at Utah | Robert Rice Stadium; Salt Lake City, UT (Holy War) | W 17–12 | 36,250 | |
| December 17 | | vs. No. 17 Ohio State* | Jack Murphy Stadium; San Diego, CA (Holiday Bowl) | L 17–47 | 52,533 | |
*Non-conference game; ^{†}Homecoming; Rankings from AP Poll released prior to the game; All times are in Mountain time

== Game summaries ==
=== At Utah ===
| Team | 1 | 2 | 3 | 4 | Total |
|---|---|---|---|---|---|
| • Cougars | 7 | 3 | 7 | 0 | 17 |
| Utes | 0 | 6 | 0 | 6 | 12 |

- Date: November 20
- Location: Rice Stadium, Salt Lake City, Utah
- Game attendance: 36,250

Scoring summary
| 1 | 5:21 | BYU | Mike Eddo 6-yard pass from Steve Young (Kurt Gunther kick) | Cougars 7–0 |
| 2 | 8:42 | UTAH | Carl Monroe 3-yard run (kick failed) | Cougars 7–6 |
| 2 | 0:02 | BYU | Kurt Gunther 32-yard field goal | Cougars 10–6 |
| 3 | 9:14 | BYU | Casey Tiumalu 16-yard pass from Steve Young (Kurt Gunther kick) | Cougars 17–6 |
| 4 | 7:12 | UTAH | Carl Monroe 4-yard run (pass failed) | Cougars 17–12 |

| Statistics | BYU | UTAH |
|---|---|---|
| First downs | 11 | 24 |
| Plays–yards | 53–300 | 84–468 |
| Rushes–yards | 19–46 | 60–313 |
| Passing yards | 254 | 155 |
| Passing: comp–att–int | 24–34–0 | 15–24–1 |
| Turnovers | 0 | 4 |

| Team | Category | Player | Statistics |
|---|---|---|---|
| BYU | Passing | Steve Young | 24/34, 254 yards, 2 TD |
| BYU | Rushing | Casey Tiumalu | 9 rushes, 39 yards |
| BYU | Receiving | Gordon Hudson | 5 receptions, 88 yards |
| Utah | Passing | Ken Vierra | 14/22, 150 yards, INT |
| Utah | Rushing | Carl Monroe | 39 rushes, 147 yards, 2 TD |
| Utah | Receiving | Roderick Wise | 5 receptions, 59 yards |

=== Vs. No. 17 Ohio State (Holiday Bowl) ===
| Team | 1 | 2 | 3 | 4 | Total |
|---|---|---|---|---|---|
| • No. 17 Buckeyes | 3 | 14 | 17 | 13 | 47 |
| Cougars | 0 | 10 | 0 | 7 | 17 |

- Date: December 17
- Location: Jack Murphy Stadium, San Diego, California
- Game attendance: 52,533
- TV announcers (ESPN): Fred White and Irv Brown
  (Mizlou): Ray Scott and Johnny Unitas

Scoring summary
| 1 | 6:54 | OSU | Rick Spangler 47-yard field goal | Buckeyes 3–0 |
| 2 | 13:56 | BYU | Neil Balholm 7-yard pass from Steve Young (Kurt Gunther kick) | Cougars 7–3 |
| 2 | 12:55 | OSU | Tim Spencer 61-yard run (Rick Spangler kick) | Buckeyes 10–7 |
| 2 | 11:14 | OSU | Mike Tomczak 3-yard run (Rick Spangler kick) | Buckeyes 17–7 |
| 2 | 1:43 | BYU | Kurt Gunther 39-yard field goal | Buckeyes 17–10 |
| 3 | 8:57 | OSU | Vaughn Broadnax 1-yard run (Rick Spangler kick) | Buckeyes 24–10 |
| 3 | 7:58 | OSU | Tim Spencer 18-yard run (Rick Spangler kick) | Buckeyes 31–10 |
| 3 | 6:00 | OSU | Rick Spangler 37-yard field goal | Buckeyes 34–10 |
| 4 | 12:58 | OSU | Jimmy Gayle 1-yard run (Rick Spangler kick) | Buckeyes 41–10 |
| 4 | 7:09 | BYU | Gordon Hudson 13-yard pass from Steve Young (Kurt Gunther kick) | Buckeyes 41–17 |
| 4 | 2:05 | OSU | Jimmy Gayle 5-yard run (kick failed) | Buckeyes 47–17 |

| Statistics | OSU | BYU |
|---|---|---|
| First downs | 24 | 21 |
| Plays–yards | 85–461 | 64–371 |
| Rushes–yards | 66–329 | 18–19 |
| Passing yards | 132 | 352 |
| Passing: comp–att–int | 11–19–0 | 28–46–1 |
| Turnovers | 1 | 2 |

| Team | Category | Player | Statistics |
|---|---|---|---|
| Ohio State | Passing | Mike Tomczak | 11/19, 132 yards |
| Ohio State | Rushing | Tim Spencer | 21 rushes, 167 yards, 2 TD |
| Ohio State | Receiving | Gary Williams | 5 receptions, 63 yards |
| BYU | Passing | Steve Young | 27/45, 341 yards, 2 TD, INT |
| BYU | Rushing | Waymon Hamilton | 3 rushes, 14 yards |
| BYU | Receiving | Gordon Hudson | 7 receptions, 81 yards, TD |

== Roster ==
1982 BYU Cougars football team roster
Players
Coaches
Offense

| Pos. | # | Name | Class |
|---|---|---|---|
| G, C | 57 | Robert Anae | So |
| QB | 6 | Robbie Bosco | Fr |
| TE | 95 | Gordon Hudson | Jr |
| C | 50 | Trevor Matich | So |
| RB | 20 | Casey Tiumalu | Jr |
| QB | 8 | Steve Young | Jr |

Defense

| Pos. | # | Name | Class |
|---|---|---|---|
| DT | 78 | Chuck Ehin | Sr |
| DE | 92 | Jim Herrmann | So |
| DE | 77 | Mike Morgan | Sr |

Special teams

| Pos. | # | Name | Class |
|---|---|---|---|
| P/K | 10 | Lee Johnson | So |

Head coach

- LaVell Edwards

Coordinators/assistant coaches

- Gary Crowton
  (Graduate assistant)
- Jim Paronto
  (Graduate assistant)
- Andy Reid
  (Graduate assistant)

Legend

- (C) Team captain
- (S) Suspended
- (I) Ineligible
- Injured
- Redshirt

Roster

== Awards and honors ==
- Neil Balholm: Second-team All-WAC
- Chuck Ehin: First-team All-WAC
- Lloyd Eldredge: First-team All-WAC
- Tom Holmoe: First-team All-WAC
- Gordon Hudson: Consensus All-American, first-team All-WAC
- Mike Mees: First-team All-WAC
- Mike Morgan: First-team All-WAC
- Bart Oates: First-team All-WAC
- Todd Shell: First-team All-WAC
- Vince Stroth: First-team All-WAC
- Casey Tiumalu: Second-team All-WAC
- Steve Young: First-team All-WAC
