= 1982 UTEP Miners football team =

American college football season

1982 UTEP Miners football
- Conference: Western Athletic Conference
- Record: 2–10 (1–6 WAC)
- Head coach: Bill Yung (1st season)
- Offensive coordinator: Hal Mumme (1st season)
- Offensive scheme: Spread
- Home stadium: Sun Bowl

1982 Western Athletic Conference football standings
	Conf.					Overall
Team	W		L		T	W		L		T
BYU $	7	–	1	–	0	8	–	4	–	0
New Mexico	6	–	1	–	0	10	–	1	–	0
Air Force	4	–	3	–	0	8	–	5	–	0
San Diego State	4	–	3	–	0	7	–	5	–	0
Hawaii	4	–	4	–	0	6	–	5	–	0
Colorado State	3	–	5	–	0	4	–	7	–	0
Utah	2	–	4	–	0	5	–	6	–	0
Wyoming	2	–	6	–	0	5	–	7	–	0
UTEP	1	–	6	–	0	2	–	10	–	0
$ – Conference champion

The 1982 UTEP Miners football team was an American football team that represented the University of Texas at El Paso in the Western Athletic Conference during the 1982 NCAA Division I-A football season. In their first year under head coach Bill Yung, the team compiled a 2–10 record.

== Schedule ==
Date	Time	Opponent	Site	Result	Attendance	Source
September 4		at New Mexico State*	Aggie Memorial Stadium; Las Cruces, NM (rivalry)	W 20–17	27,306	
September 11		at No. 2 Washington*	Husky Stadium; Seattle, WA	L 0–55	51,000	
September 18		No. 6 SMU*	Sun Bowl; El Paso, TX	L 10–31	33,509	
September 25		at Hawaii	Aloha Stadium; Halawa, HI	L 10–17	42,924	
October 2		BYU	Sun Bowl; El Paso, TX	L 3–51	34,108	
October 9		at UNLV*	Las Vegas Silver Bowl; Whitney, NV	L 21–28	17,289	
October 16		at No. 10 Arizona State*	Sun Devil Stadium; Tempe, AZ	L 6–37	25,203	
October 23	7:36 p.m.	Air Force^{†}	Sun Bowl; El Paso, TX	L 7–35	28,678	
October 30		at Colorado State	Hughes Stadium; Fort Collins, CO	L 13–38	24,074	
November 6		New Mexico	Sun Bowl; El Paso, TX	L 18–31	15,101	
November 13		Utah	Sun Bowl; El Paso, TX	L 30–45	9,594	
November 20		Wyoming	Sun Bowl; El Paso, TX	W 39–32	9,158	
*Non-conference game; ^{†}Homecoming; Rankings from AP Poll released prior to the game; All times are in Mountain time
