= 1982 Air Force Falcons football team =

American college football season

1982 Air Force Falcons football
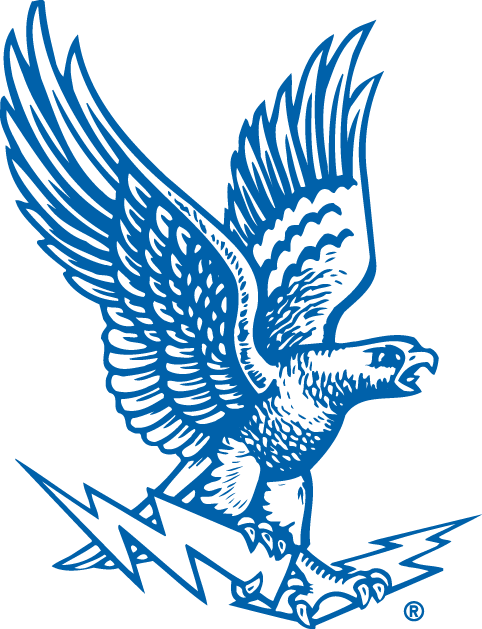

Hall of Fame Classic champion

Hall of Fame Classic, W 36–28 vs. Vanderbilt
- Conference: Western Athletic Conference
- Record: 8–5 (4–3 WAC)
- Head coach: Ken Hatfield (4th season)
- Offensive coordinator: Fisher DeBerry (2nd season)
- Offensive scheme: Wishbone triple option
- Defensive coordinator: Chan Gailey (2nd season)
- Base defense: 3–4
- Captain: Johnny Jackson
- Home stadium: Falcon Stadium

1982 Western Athletic Conference football standings
	Conf.					Overall
Team	W		L		T	W		L		T
BYU $	7	–	1	–	0	8	–	4	–	0
New Mexico	6	–	1	–	0	10	–	1	–	0
Air Force	4	–	3	–	0	8	–	5	–	0
San Diego State	4	–	3	–	0	7	–	5	–	0
Hawaii	4	–	4	–	0	6	–	5	–	0
Colorado State	3	–	5	–	0	4	–	7	–	0
Utah	2	–	4	–	0	5	–	6	–	0
Wyoming	2	–	6	–	0	5	–	7	–	0
UTEP	1	–	6	–	0	2	–	10	–	0
$ – Conference champion

The 1982 Air Force Falcons football team represented the United States Air Force Academy in the Western Athletic Conference (WAC) during the 1982 NCAA Division I-A football season. Led by fourth-year head coach Ken Hatfield, Air Force played its home games at Falcon Stadium in Colorado Springs and finished the regular season at 7–5 (4–3 in WAC, third), for their first winning record in nine years.

Following their upset of No. 18 Notre Dame on November 20, Air Force was invited to play in the Hall of Fame Classic in Birmingham on December 31, where they rallied to upset Vanderbilt and finished at 8–5. It was the first bowl appearance for the Falcons in twelve years and their first postseason win.

== Schedule ==
Date	Time	Opponent	Site	Result	Attendance	Source
September 4	6:35 p.m.	at Tulsa*	Skelly Stadium; Tulsa, OK	L 17–35	29,811	
September 11	1:35 p.m.	San Diego State	Falcon Stadium; Colorado Springs, CO	W 44–32	23,000	
September 18	6:31 p.m.	at Texas Tech*	Jones Stadium; Lubbock, TX	L 30–31	38,694	
September 25	1:30 p.m.	at BYU	Cougar Stadium; Provo, UT	W 39–38	64,253	
October 2	1:48 p.m.	New Mexico	Falcon Stadium; Colorado Springs, CO	L 37–49	25,576	
October 9	1:30 p.m.	Navy*	Falcon Stadium; Colorado Springs, CO (Commander-in-Chief's Trophy)	W 24–21	37,109	
October 16	1:30 p.m.	Colorado State	Falcon Stadium; Colorado Springs, CO (rivalry)	L 11–21	25,326	
October 23	7:36 p.m.	at UTEP	Sun Bowl; El Paso, TX	W 35–7	28,678	
October 30	1:30 p.m.	Wyoming	Falcon Stadium; Colorado Springs, CO	W 44–34	22,740	
November 6	11:32 a.m.	at Army*	Michie Stadium; West Point, NY (Commander-in-Chief's Trophy)	W 27–9	40,252	
November 20	1:00 p.m.	No. 18 Notre Dame*	Falcon Stadium; Colorado Springs, CO (rivalry)	W 30–17	46,712	
November 27	10:31 p.m.	at Hawaii	Aloha Stadium; Halawa, HI (rivalry)	L 21–45	40,019	
December 31		vs. Vanderbilt*	Legion Field; Birmingham, AL (Hall of Fame Classic)	W 36–28	75,114	
*Non-conference game; Rankings from AP Poll released prior to the game; All times are in Mountain time

== Roster ==
1982 Air Force Falcons football team roster
Players
Coaches
Offense

Pos.	#	Name	Class
FB		John Kreshner	Jr
QB	11	Marty Louthan	Jr
OL		Dave Schrek	Sr
HB		Jody Simmons	So
HB		Ted Sundquist

Defense

Pos.	#	Name	Class
LB		Carl Dieudonne	Jr
DL		Chris Funk	So
S		Scott Thomas	Fr

Special teams

Pos.	#	Name	Class
P		Jeff Kubiak	Jr
K		Sean Pavlich

Head coach

- Ken Hatfield (4th year)

Coordinators/assistant coaches

Legend

- (C) Team captain
- (S) Suspended
- (I) Ineligible
- Injured
- Redshirt

== Awards and honors ==
- Dave Schrek, guard, 3rd team All-American (AP), 1st team All-WAC
