= 1982 Wyoming Cowboys football team =

American college football season

1982 Wyoming Cowboys football
- Conference: Western Athletic Conference
- Record: 5–7 (2–6 WAC)
- Head coach: Al Kincaid (2nd season)
- Captains: Joe Digiorgio; Guy Frazier
- Home stadium: War Memorial Stadium

1982 Western Athletic Conference football standings
	Conf.					Overall
Team	W		L		T	W		L		T
BYU $	7	–	1	–	0	8	–	4	–	0
New Mexico	6	–	1	–	0	10	–	1	–	0
Air Force	4	–	3	–	0	8	–	5	–	0
San Diego State	4	–	3	–	0	7	–	5	–	0
Hawaii	4	–	4	–	0	6	–	5	–	0
Colorado State	3	–	5	–	0	4	–	7	–	0
Utah	2	–	4	–	0	5	–	6	–	0
Wyoming	2	–	6	–	0	5	–	7	–	0
UTEP	1	–	6	–	0	2	–	10	–	0
$ – Conference champion

The 1982 Wyoming Cowboys football team represented the University of Wyoming as a member of the Western Athletic Conference (WAC) during the 1982 NCAA Division I-A football season. Led by second-year head coach Al Kincaid, the Cowboys compiled a 5-7 record (2-6 against conference opponents), and finished eighth in the WAC. The team played home games at War Memorial Stadium in Laramie, Wyoming.

== Schedule ==
Date	Time	Opponent	Site	Result	Attendance	Source
September 4		New Mexico	War Memorial Stadium; Laramie, WY	L 20–41	22,717	
September 11		at Colorado State	Hughes Stadium; Fort Collins, CO (rivalry)	L 3–9	28,652	
September 18	1:30 p.m.	Long Beach State*	War Memorial Stadium; Laramie, WY	W 36–27	16,844	
September 25		at Colorado*	Folsom Field; Boulder, CO	W 24–10	40,593	
October 2		at Hawaii	Aloha Stadium; Halawa, HI (rivalry)	W 28–10	43,493	
October 9		San Diego State	War Memorial Stadium; Laramie, WY	L 21–24	16,895	
October 16		Cal State Fullerton*	War Memorial Stadium; Laramie, WY	L 16–20	17,320	
October 23		Utah	War Memorial Stadium; Laramie, WY	W 16–13	18,382	
October 30	1:30 p.m.	at Air Force	Falcon Stadium; Colorado Springs, CO	L 34–44	22,740	
November 6		at BYU	Cougar Stadium; Provo, UT	L 13–23	64,819	
November 13	1:00 p.m.	Wichita State*	War Memorial Stadium; Laramie, WY	W 24–20	8,713	
November 20		at UTEP	Sun Bowl; El Paso, TX	L 32–39	9,158	
*Non-conference game; All times are in Mountain time
