= Southwest High School (San Diego, California) =

Public high school in San Diego, California, United States

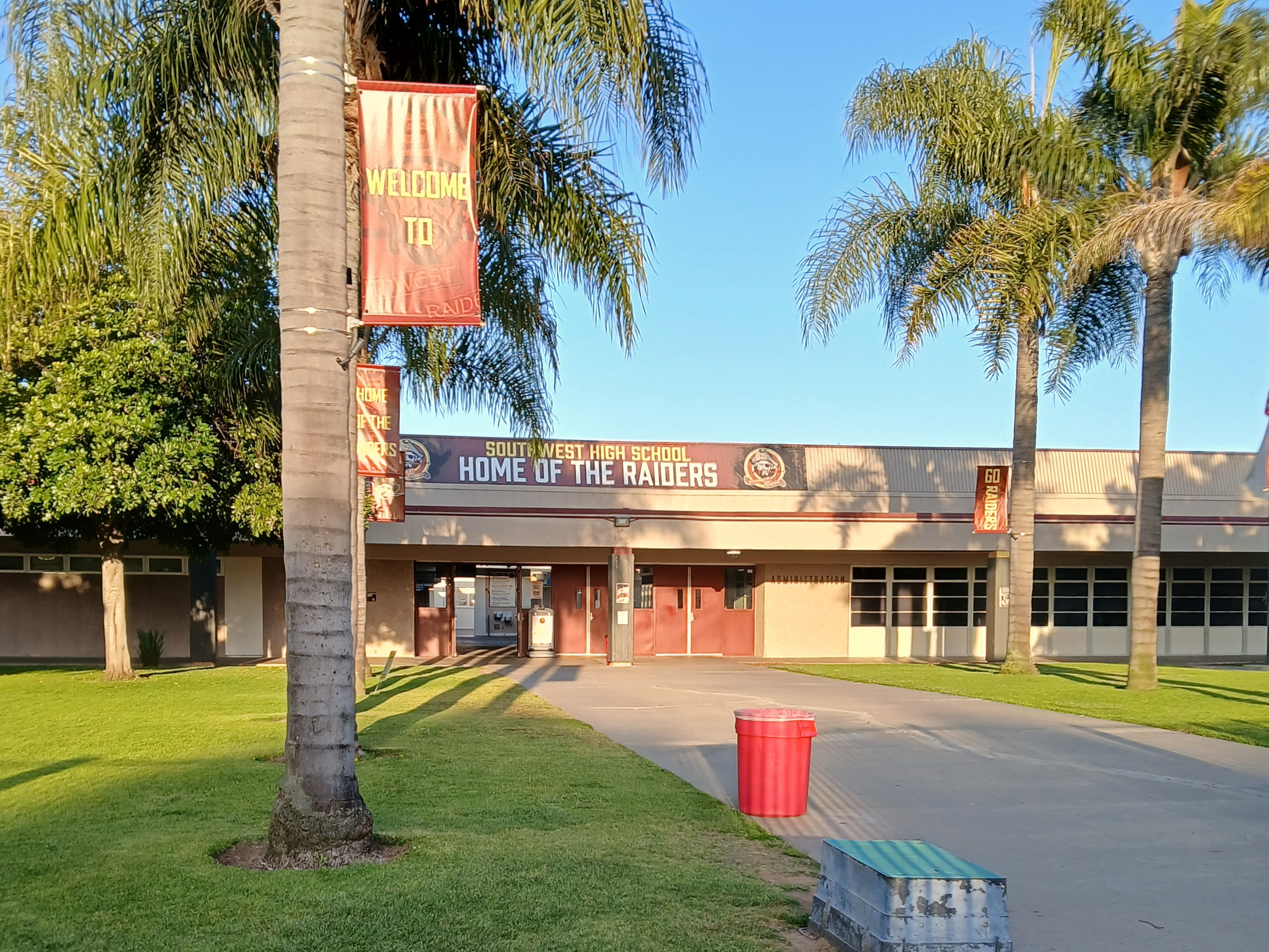
- Southwest front entrance

Location
- 1685 Hollister Street; San Diego, California; United States; 32°34′1″N 117°5′0″W

Information
- Type: Public Secondary
- Motto: "Once a Raider, Always a Raider!"
- Established: July 1, 1980
- School district: Sweetwater Union High School District
- Superintendent: Moisés G. Aguirre
- Principal: Easter Finley
- Faculty: 71.08 (on an FTE basis)
- Grades: 9-12
- Student to teacher ratio: 22.31
- Campus: Suburban
- Colors: Cardinal red and gold
- Mascot: Raider
- Newspaper: The Raider Report
- Yearbook: The Scimitar
- Website: http://soh.sweetwaterschools.org/

Southwest High School (SOH) is a public secondary school in San Diego, California, United States. It was established in 1975. It was built on the site of a small railroad yard owned by the Southern Pacific Railroad along the original San Diego–Tijuana line. It existed until the mid-1930s when the tracks were moved east to the present-day trolley tracks.

Part of Sweetwater Union High School District, it serves all socioeconomic communities of San Diego (specifically the Nestor community), as well as some students living in Chula Vista, Imperial Beach and San Ysidro. The school serves approximately 1,600 students.

== History ==
A Southwest High School senior achieved a perfect score on the 2015 AP Spanish Language and Culture exam, one of only 55 students worldwide to do so. After exiting the English Learner program, the student went to college prep courses and took multiple AP classes. The accomplishment was supported by the school and Sweetwater Union High School District.

== Athletics ==
The Southwest Raiders sports teams represent Southwest Senior High School in high school sports programs. It competes in the Metropolitan – Mesa League under the South Bay League of the CIF San Diego Section.

The Raiders football team played its first home game in 1985 after previously hosting games at Mar Vista High School, Montgomery High School, and Southwestern College.

== Notable alumni ==
- Frankie J, pop singer
- Damon Washington, NFL running back for the New York Giants
- Adrian Garcia Marquez, sportscaster and sports announcer (Fox Sports, ESPN Radio, MLB, NFL, San Diego Chargers)
- Chris Martin, former professional boxer who held the NABO junior featherweight title
- Rene Ortiz, former professional soccer player for the San Diego Sockers and coach of Mexico national arena soccer team

== See also ==
- Primary and secondary schools in San Diego, California
- List of high schools in San Diego County, California
- List of high schools in California
