= 1982 San Diego State Aztecs football team =

American college football season

1982 San Diego State Aztecs football
- Conference: Western Athletic Conference
- Record: 7–5 (4–3 WAC)
- Head coach: Doug Scovil (2nd season)
- Offensive scheme: West Coast
- Base defense: 4–3
- Home stadium: Jack Murphy Stadium

1982 Western Athletic Conference football standings
	Conf.					Overall
Team	W		L		T	W		L		T
BYU $	7	–	1	–	0	8	–	4	–	0
New Mexico	6	–	1	–	0	10	–	1	–	0
Air Force	4	–	3	–	0	8	–	5	–	0
San Diego State	4	–	3	–	0	7	–	5	–	0
Hawaii	4	–	4	–	0	6	–	5	–	0
Colorado State	3	–	5	–	0	4	–	7	–	0
Utah	2	–	4	–	0	5	–	6	–	0
Wyoming	2	–	6	–	0	5	–	7	–	0
UTEP	1	–	6	–	0	2	–	10	–	0
$ – Conference champion

The 1982 San Diego State Aztecs football team represented San Diego State University during the 1982 NCAA Division I-A football season as a member of the Western Athletic Conference (WAC).

The team was led by head coach Doug Scovil, in his second year, and played home games at Jack Murphy Stadium (Note: San Diego County Credit Union Stadium (SDCCU Stadium) was known as Jack Murphy Stadium from 1981 through 1997.) in San Diego, California. They finished with a record of seven wins and five losses (7–5, 4–3 WAC).

== Schedule ==
Date	Time	Opponent	Site	Result	Attendance	Source
September 11	12:35 p.m.	at Air Force	Falcon Stadium; Colorado Springs, CO	L 32–44	23,000	
September 18	1:02 p.m.	at California*	California Memorial Stadium; Berkeley, CA	L 0–28	35,000	
September 25		UNLV*	Jack Murphy Stadium; San Diego, CA	W 26–23	24,207	
October 2		at No. 1 Washington*	Husky Stadium; Seattle, WA	L 25–46	55,528	
October 9		at Wyoming	War Memorial Stadium; Laramie, Wyoming	W 24–21	16,895	
October 16		New Mexico	Jack Murphy Stadium; San Diego, CA	L 17–22	22,679	
October 23	7:30 p.m.	Long Beach State*^{†}	Jack Murphy Stadium; San Diego, CA	W 51–17	24,938	
October 30		Utah	Jack Murphy Stadium; San Diego, CA	W 21–17	15,272	
November 6		at Hawaii	Aloha Stadium; Halawa, HI	W 31–28	42,050	
November 13		at BYU	Cougar Stadium; Provo, UT	L 8–58	36,250	
November 20		Colorado State	Jack Murphy Stadium; San Diego, CA	W 38–10	18,244	
November 27		Oklahoma State*	Jack Murphy Stadium; San Diego, CA	W 35–6	17,210	
*Non-conference game; ^{†}Homecoming; Rankings from AP Poll released prior to the game; All times are in Pacific time

== Team players in the NFL ==
The following were selected in the 1983 NFL draft.

Player	Position	Round	Overall	NFL team
Clint Sampson	Wide receiver	3	60	Denver Broncos
Todd Seabaugh	Linebacker	3	79	Pittsburgh Steelers
Phil Smith	Wide receiver	4	85	Baltimore Colts
Doug Reed	Defensive end – Defensive tackle	4	111	Los Angeles Rams
Darius Durham	Wide receiver	10	270	Tampa Bay Buccaneers

The following finished their college career in 1982, were not drafted, but played in the NFL.

Player	Position	First NFL team
Darrell Pattillo	Defensive back	1983 San Diego Chargers
David Croudip	Defensive back	1984 Los Angeles Rams

== Team awards ==
Award	Player
Most Valuable Player (John Simcox Memorial Trophy)	Darius Durham
Outstanding Offensive & Defensive Linemen (Byron H. Chase Memorial Trophy)	Greg Foster, Off; Doug Reed, Def
Team captains Dr. R. Hardy / C.E. Peterson Memorial Trophy	Matt Long, Off; Mike Fox, Def
Most Inspirational Player	Alan Dale
