= 1982 Utah Utes football team =

American college football season

1982 Utah Utes football
- Conference: Western Athletic Conference
- Record: 5–6 (2–4 WAC)
- Head coach: Chuck Stobart (1st season)
- Offensive coordinator: Ron McBride (6th season)
- Defensive coordinator: Tom Gadd (6th season)
- Home stadium: Robert Rice Stadium

1982 Western Athletic Conference football standings
	Conf.					Overall
Team	W		L		T	W		L		T
BYU $	7	–	1	–	0	8	–	4	–	0
New Mexico	6	–	1	–	0	10	–	1	–	0
Air Force	4	–	3	–	0	8	–	5	–	0
San Diego State	4	–	3	–	0	7	–	5	–	0
Hawaii	4	–	4	–	0	6	–	5	–	0
Colorado State	3	–	5	–	0	4	–	7	–	0
Utah	2	–	4	–	0	5	–	6	–	0
Wyoming	2	–	6	–	0	5	–	7	–	0
UTEP	1	–	6	–	0	2	–	10	–	0
$ – Conference champion

The 1982 Utah Utes football team was an American football team that represented the University of Utah as a member of the Western Athletic Conference (WAC) during the 1982 NCAA Division I-A football season. In their first season under head coach Chuck Stobart, the Utes compiled an overall record of 5–6 with a mark of 2–4 against conference opponents, placing seventh in the WAC. Home games were played on campus at Robert Rice Stadium in Salt Lake City.

== Schedule ==
Date	Time	Opponent	Site	Result	Attendance	Source
September 4	7:30 pm	Montana State*	Robert Rice Stadium; Salt Lake City, UT	W 30–12	27,623	
September 11	8:30 pm	at No. 15 Arizona State*	Sun Devil Stadium; Tempe, AZ	L 10–23	59,723	
September 18	6:00 pm	at No. 18 Texas*	Texas Memorial Stadium; Austin, TX	L 12–21	70,158	
October 1	7:30 pm	Colorado State	Robert Rice Stadium; Salt Lake City, UT	W 35–14	28,603	
October 9	11:30 pm	at Hawaii	Aloha Stadium; Halawa, HI	L 7–10	43,381	
October 16	1:30 pm	UNLV*	Robert Rice Stadium; Salt Lake City, UT	W 24–14	26,182	
October 23	1:30 pm	at Wyoming	War Memorial Stadium; Laramie, WY	L 13–16	18,382	
October 30	8:30 pm	at San Diego State	Jack Murphy Stadium; San Diego, CA	L 17–21	15,272	
November 6	1:30 pm	Utah State*^{†}	Robert Rice Stadium; Salt Lake City, UT (Battle of the Brothers)	W 42–10	30,625	
November 13	7:30 pm	at UTEP	Sun Bowl; El Paso, TX	W 45–30	9,594	
November 20	12:00 pm	BYU	Robert Rice Stadium; Salt Lake City, UT (Holy War)	L 12–17	36,250	
*Non-conference game; ^{†}Homecoming; Rankings from AP Poll released prior to the game; All times are in Mountain time

== Roster ==
1982 Utah Utes football team roster
Players
Coaches
Offense

Pos.	#	Name	Class
WR	8	Steve Cox	Sr
G	64	Dan Doubiago	Jr
TE	83	Len Hollandsworth	Jr
QB	14	Michael Kiel	Fr
FB	36	Mike Kunz	Sr
RB	25	Carl Monroe	Sr
TE	82	Andy Parker	Jr
QB	7	Ken Vierra	So

Defense

Pos.	#	Name	Class
LB	46	Filipo Mokofis	Fr

Special teams

Pos.	#	Name	Class

Head coach

- Chuck Stobart

Coordinators/assistant coaches

Legend

- (C) Team captain
- (S) Suspended
- (I) Ineligible
- Injured
- Redshirt
