= 1982 Hawaii Rainbow Warriors football team =

American college football season

1982 Hawaii Rainbow Warriors football
- Conference: Western Athletic Conference
- Record: 6–5 (4–4 WAC)
- Head coach: Dick Tomey (6th season)
- Home stadium: Aloha Stadium

1982 Western Athletic Conference football standings
	Conf.					Overall
Team	W		L		T	W		L		T
BYU $	7	–	1	–	0	8	–	4	–	0
New Mexico	6	–	1	–	0	10	–	1	–	0
Air Force	4	–	3	–	0	8	–	5	–	0
San Diego State	4	–	3	–	0	7	–	5	–	0
Hawaii	4	–	4	–	0	6	–	5	–	0
Colorado State	3	–	5	–	0	4	–	7	–	0
Utah	2	–	4	–	0	5	–	6	–	0
Wyoming	2	–	6	–	0	5	–	7	–	0
UTEP	1	–	6	–	0	2	–	10	–	0
$ – Conference champion

The 1982 Hawaii Rainbow Warriors football team represented the University of Hawaiʻi at Mānoa in the Western Athletic Conference during the 1982 NCAA Division I-A football season. In their sixth season under head coach Dick Tomey, the Rainbow Warriors compiled a 6–5 record.

== Schedule ==
Date	Time	Opponent	Site	Result	Attendance	Source
September 11		Montana*	Aloha Stadium; Halawa, HI	W 40–0	43,317	
September 18		at Colorado State	Hughes Stadium; Fort Collins, CO	W 23–13	24,290	
September 25		UTEP	Aloha Stadium; Halawa, HI	W 17–10	42,924	
October 2		Wyoming	Aloha Stadium; Halawa, HI (rivalry)	L 10–28	43,493	
October 9		Utah	Aloha Stadium; Halawa, HI	W 10–7	43,381	
October 16		at BYU	Cougar Stadium; Provo, UT	L 25–39	65,178	
October 30		Cal State Fullerton*	Aloha Stadium; Halawa, HI	W 9–3	34,133	
November 6		San Diego State^{†}	Aloha Stadium; Halawa, HI	L 28–31	42,050	
November 20		at New Mexico	University Stadium; Albuquerque, NM	L 17–41	23,028	
November 27	7:31 p.m.	Air Force	Aloha Stadium; Halawa, HI (rivalry)	W 45–21	40,019	
December 4		No. 3 Nebraska*	Aloha Stadium; Halawa, HI	L 16–37	46,866	
*Non-conference game; ^{†}Homecoming; Rankings from AP Poll released prior to the game; All times are in Hawaii–Aleutian time
