= Steve Bartalo =

American football player (born 1964)

No. 25, 42
- Positions: Running back, fullback

Personal information
- Born: July 15, 1964 (age 62); Limestone, Maine, U.S.
- Listed height: 5 ft 9 in (1.75 m)
- Listed weight: 200 lb (91 kg)

Career information
- High school: Thomas B. Doherty (Colorado Springs, Colorado)
- College: Colorado State
- NFL draft: 1987: 6th round, 143rd overall pick

Career history
- Tampa Bay Buccaneers (1987); San Francisco 49ers (1988); Frankfurt Galaxy (1991–1992)

Awards and highlights
- Second-team All-American (1986); WAC Offensive Player of the Year (1986); WAC Newcomer of the Year (1983); 3× First-team All-WAC (1984–1986); Second-team All-WAC (1983)

Career NFL statistics
- Rushing yards: 30
- Rushing average: 3.3
- Rushing touchdowns: 1
- Stats at Pro Football Reference

Stephen James Bartalo (born July 15, 1964) is an American former professional football player who was a running back in the National Football League (NFL) and the World League of American Football (WLAF). He played for the Tampa Bay Buccaneers of the NFL, and the Frankfurt Galaxy of the WLAF. Bartalo played collegiately at the Colorado State University. He was selected by the Buccaneers in the sixth round of the 1987 NFL draft.

== Early life ==
Bartalo was born on July 15, 1964, in Limestone, Maine, to Anthony and Lorraine Bartalo. He attended Thomas B. Doherty High School in Colorado Springs, Colorado, where he earned two letters in football and three in wrestling. In wrestling, he earned all-city and all-conference honors as a junior and senior and won a conference championship as a junior. In football, he received honorable mention all-city and all-conference honors during both his junior and senior seasons.

Bartalo was not heavily recruited and elected to walk-on at Colorado State University in the fall of 1982. He majored in physical education.

== College career ==
Bartalo enrolled at Colorado State University in the fall of 1982, joining the program under first-year head coach Leon Fuller. Originally a scout-team quarterback, he redshirted and did not appear in a game.

In 1983, Bartalo was listed at 5 feet 9 inches and 185 pounds and transitioned to fullback. He began the season as the fourth-team fullback and did not appear in the season opener against Air Force. He was also left off the traveling squad for the following week's game against Hawaii, as the Rams opened the season 0–2 while scoring just 13 combined points. Midway through the Week 3 game against Colorado, Fuller turned to Bartalo, who rushed for 61 yards on 17 carries in his collegiate debut. The following week against Iowa State, he set a school record with 43 carries for 134 yards in a 21–17 loss. In the Rams' subsequent game, Bartalo scored the go-ahead and game-winning touchdown with just over three minutes remaining in a 31–28 victory, recording his first collegiate touchdown. In Week 8 against UTEP, he rushed for 205 yards on 38 carries in a 31–15 win. Despite missing the first two games, Bartalo led the conference with 1,113 rushing yards on 292 carries and eight touchdowns. He also recorded 35 receptions for 284 yards and a touchdown. For his performance, he was named second-team All-WAC and WAC Newcomer of the Year.

Following his freshman season, Bartalo was awarded a scholarship heading into 1984. Fuller said, "We gave him the ball 30 times some games last year. I don't see that changing this season." Bartalo appeared in eight of the Rams' 11 games, rushing for more than 100 yards in six of his appearances. Despite missing three games, he finished the season with 913 yards on 219 carries and seven touchdowns, while recording 17 receptions for 182 yards and a touchdown. In Week 10 against UTEP, he rushed for a school-record four touchdowns in a 59–31 victory. He was named first-team All-WAC.

In Week 6 of the 1985 season, Bartalo rushed for 152 yards and three touchdowns on a program-record 47 carries in a victory against New Mexico. The following week against No. 10 Air Force, he ran for a career-high 207 yards on 47 carries and a touchdown in a loss. He carried the ball 94 times over a 14-day span. Bartalo finished the season with 1,368 yards on 338 carries and 12 touchdowns, breaking the school's single-season rushing record. He also recorded 40 receptions for 324 yards and a touchdown and rushed for at least 100 yards in eight games. He was named first-team All-WAC for the second consecutive season and received honorable mention All-America honors.

Entering his redshirt senior season, Bartalo was already Colorado State's all-time leading rusher with 3,394 yards and had recorded 19 games with at least 100 rushing yards. In 1986, he appeared in and started all 11 games, rushing for 1,419 yards on 362 carries and 19 touchdowns. He led the NCAA in rushing attempts and rushing touchdowns. He also recorded 40 receptions for 289 yards. Bartalo rushed for at least 100 yards in nine games and scored multiple rushing touchdowns in seven, bringing his career total to 28 100-yard rushing performances. He led the NCAA with 10.4 points per game and ranked third with 129 rushing yards per game. He was named first-team All-WAC for the third consecutive season, selected as the WAC Offensive Player of the Year, and earned second-team All-American honors.

Bartalo finished his collegiate career with 4,813 rushing yards, which ranked seventh in NCAA history at the time, on 1,211 carries in 41 games. He also recorded 132 receptions for 1,079 yards and three touchdowns. His 1,211 rushing attempts and 1,343 total plays from scrimmage both set NCAA records. Bartalo accumulated 5,892 yards from scrimmage and scored 49 total touchdowns during his career.

In 1995, Bartalo was inducted into the Colorado State University Athletics Hall of Fame.

== Professional career ==
Pre-draft measurables
Height	Weight	Arm length	Hand span	40-yard dash	10-yard split	20-yard split	20-yard shuttle	Vertical jump	Broad jump	Bench press
5 ft 8 3/4 in (1.75 m)	201 lb (91 kg)	28 in (0.71 m)	9 1/2 in (0.24 m)	4.83 s	1.61 s	2.70 s	4.05 s	28.5 in (0.72 m)	9 ft 6 in (2.90 m)	14 reps
All values from NFL Combine

=== Tampa Bay Buccaneers ===
Bartalo was selected by the Tampa Bay Buccaneers in the sixth round (143rd overall) of the 1987 NFL draft. He made his NFL debut in Week 1 of the 1987 season against the Atlanta Falcons. Late in the fourth quarter, Bartalo took a pitch from quarterback Steve DeBerg and scored his first NFL touchdown on a three-yard rush. He finished the game with seven carries for 23 yards and a touchdown in the 48–10 victory. Following a Week 2 loss to the Chicago Bears, the league experienced a players' strike that resulted in the cancellation of Week 3 games and the use of replacement players from Weeks 4 through 6. Following the end of the strike, Bartalo appeared against Chicago in Week 7. In Week 11 against the San Francisco 49ers, he recorded his first career reception, catching a pass from DeBerg in a 24–10 loss. In the regular-season finale against the Indianapolis Colts, Bartalo returned his first kickoff for 15 yards and later threw a pass on a trick-play pitch that was intercepted by Mike Prior. He appeared in nine of the Buccaneers' 15 games, finishing the season with nine carries for 30 yards and a touchdown, one reception for 15 yards, and one kickoff return for 15 yards. On May 4, 1988, Bartalo was released.

=== San Francisco 49ers ===
On May 17, 1988, Bartalo was claimed off waivers by the San Francisco 49ers. On August 21, he was placed on injured reserve. He was activated on October 24 ahead of the 49ers' Week 8 Monday Night Football matchup against the Chicago Bears. However, he was released on October 28 and did not appear in a regular-season game for the team. The 49ers went on to win Super Bowl XXIII. On July 28, 1989, Bartalo re-signed with San Francisco but was released on August 31 following the preseason.

=== Frankfurt Galaxy ===
In 1991, Bartalo signed with the Frankfurt Galaxy of the World League of American Football (WLAF). During the team's inaugural season, he played under head coach Jack Elway and shared the backfield with running back Tony Baker, who was named a first-team All-League selection. Primarily used as a blocker, Bartalo appeared in all 10 games, making two starts, and recorded nine receptions for 102 yards and a touchdown. The Galaxy finished with a 7–3 record but missed the playoffs.

Bartalo returned for the 1992 season, recording 19 carries for 82 yards and six receptions for 50 yards. The Galaxy finished 3–7. Across two seasons with Frankfurt, Bartalo recorded 20 carries for 82 yards, 15 receptions for 152 yards and a touchdown, and four kickoff returns for 19 yards.

== Career statistics ==
=== NFL ===
Year	Team	Games		Rushing					Receiving					Fumbles	
Year	Team	GP	GS	Att	Yds	Avg	Lng	TD	Rec	Yds	Avg	Lng	TD	Fum	Lost
1987	TB	9	0	9	30	3.3	6	1	1	5	5.0	5	0	0	0
1988	SF	DNP													
Career		9	0	9	30	3.3	6	1	1	5	5.0	5	0	0	0

=== WLAF ===
Year	Team	Games		Rushing					Receiving				
Year	Team	GP	GS	Att	Yds	Avg	Lng	TD	Rec	Yds	Avg	Lng	TD
1991	Frankfurt	10	2	1	0	0.0	0	0	9	102	11.3	28	1
1992	Frankfurt	?	?	19	82	4.3	17	0	6	50	8.3	15	0
Career		?	?	20	82	4.1	17	0	15	152	10.1	28	1

=== College ===
Legend
FBS record
Led NCAA Division I FBS

Year	Team	GP	Rushing				Receiving			
Year	Team	GP	Att	Yds	Avg	TD	Rec	Yds	Avg	TD
1982	Colorado State	0	Redshirted (redshirt)							
1983	Colorado State	10	292	1,113	3.8	8	35	284	8.1	1
1984	Colorado State	8	219	913	4.2	7	17	182	10.7	1
1985	Colorado State	12	338	1,368	4.0	12	40	324	8.1	1
1986	Colorado State	11	362	1,419	3.9	19	40	289	7.2	0
Career		41	1,211	4,813	4.0	46	132	1,079	8.2	3

== See also ==
- List of NCAA major college football yearly scoring leaders
