= Dustin Osborn =

American football player (born 1984)

Profile
- Position: Wide receiver

Personal information
- Born: March 26, 1984 (age 42); La Junta, Colorado
- Listed height: 6 ft 0 in (1.83 m)
- Listed weight: 194 lb (88 kg)

Career information
- College: Colorado State
- NFL draft: 2007: undrafted

Career history
- New York Jets (2007)*
- * Offseason or practice squad member only

Dustin Anthony Osborn (born March 26, 1984) is an American former football player.

== Early life ==
Osborn grew up in La Junta, Colorado. He is the son of Mary Jo Osborn and Jim Osborn. Has two brothers.

== High School years ==
Osborn attended La Junta High School in La Junta, Colorado, and was a two-time football varsity letter award winner. He also earned three basketball letter awards and four in track.

== College football career ==
Osborn was a wide receiver, kick returner, and punt returner for the Colorado State Rams. He majored in business administration. He was red-shirted after joining the team as a walk-on in 2003. He played four years for Colorado State and entered the 2007 NFL Draft as a senior.

=== Career statistics ===
==== Receiving ====
Year	Team	Receptions	Yards	Average	Longest	Touchdowns	Fumbles	Lost
2004	CSU	30	555	18.5	37	3	0	0
2005	CSU	19	293	15.4	33	5	0	0
2006	CSU	26	397	15.3	60	2	0	0

== Pro football career ==
Osborn did not get drafted in the NFL Draft, but was signed by the New York Jets as an undrafted free agent on April 30, 2007. Terms of the deal were not disclosed. Osborn was released on May 15, 2007.
