= Jack Graham (politician) =

John Collins Graham
- Born: June 17, 1952 (age 74)
- Education: Colorado State University
- Occupations: Entrepreneur, politician
- Children: 3
- Website: www.jackgraham2016.com

John Collins Graham (born June 17, 1952), also known as Jack Graham, is an American business executive and former Colorado State University athletic director. He was a Republican Party candidate for a United States Senate seat in Colorado in the 2016 elections.

== Biography ==
=== Early years ===
Graham was born in Cleveland, Ohio, the son of Janet Elizabeth Collins, a homemaker, and Joseph Jacob Graham, former president of Montgomery and Collins, a brokerage firm owned by the Insurance Company of North America (INA), subsequently CIGNA. Raised in Palo Alto, California, Graham attended Ellwood P. Cubberley High School and played football, basketball and golf. He earned an athletic scholarship and played as quarterback at the University of California Santa Barbara (UCSB). The riots and social unrest of 1970 led to the termination of his University football program in 1972. He transferred to Foothill College where he attracted the attention of Colorado State University (CSU). As a result, Graham received an athletic scholarship following an invitation to visit Fort Collins, Colorado. He played quarterback at CSU and set the record as the second highest passing yards in a single game in school history in 1974. Graham graduated from CSU with a Bachelor of Arts in history. Then, he was drafted into the National Football League (NFL) by the Miami Dolphins in the spring of 1975. Later, Graham landed in San Francisco with the San Francisco 49ers where he was unsuccessful in making the roster, ending his professional football career.

Graham and his wife Ginger live in Colorado. They have three children and three grandchildren, including actress, Kendel Graham.

== Business career ==
=== ICAT ===
Graham built a career creating collaborations with businesses to bring private capital to public markets. As a result, he helped solve large financial problems and keeping markets open to protect homeowners and small business owners in catastrophe exposed areas of the U.S. Graham was the founder, chairman and CEO of International Catastrophe Insurance Managers, LLC (ICAT) renamed ICAT Holdings, LLC. He formed ICAT Syndicate 4242 at Lloyd's of London in 2007. Graham was the CEO of Paraline Group Ltd., a holding company formed in 2010 by Elliot Capital to acquire ICAT and other businesses formed by Graham. In July 1998, Graham founded International Catastrophe Insurance Managers, LLC.

=== Natural disasters ===
In 1992, as Hurricane Iniki hit Hawaii, Graham collaborated with the insurance commissioner, which led to Hawaii Hurricane Relief Fund legislation, a local solution to hurricane insurance. Following the 1994 Northridge earthquake that hit California, Graham contributed in establishing the California Earthquake Authority (CEA) in 1996. Then, Graham was invited to join the Advisory Council for the National Center for Atmospheric Research (NCAR) due to his market utilization of atmospheric data and significant business expertise in managing risk associated with hurricane activity. He sat on the NCAR Advisory Council for over a decade.

=== Recognition ===
In 1989 and 1996, Graham earned the E.W. Blanch, Sr. Award for outstanding reinsurance intermediary of the year. Graham was recognized as the 2003 Ernst and Young Entrepreneur of the Year for financial services in the Rocky Mountain Region.

== Athletic activities ==
After retiring from ICAT in 2011, Graham was recruited by the president of Colorado State University as its athletic director for a D-1 program including 16 sports, over 400 student athletes and the 200 members of the athletic department staff. During his tenure, he proposed the construction of a new on-campus football stadium, led the creation of a sports Hall of Fame, a retail outlet called the Ram Zone, and negotiated contracts with ESPN Radio and Under Armour. Based on internal disagreements, Graham's contract with CSU was ended in late 2014. Graham was recognized as the Triple Impact Professional by the Positive Coaching Alliance in 2013. In January 2015, he joined the board of the Positive Coaching Alliance of Colorado and became its chairman of the board.

Graham joined the University of Colorado's Sports Governance Center Board of Advisors in early 2016.

== Political activities ==
Graham became the first Republican candidate to be officially named on the June 28 primary ballot through the petition process alone. Jack Graham supports reducing federal regulatory burden and income taxes on corporations, and is in favor of a balanced budget amendment. Graham contributed $1 million of personal money into the campaign, raised a record $341,000 in the first three months of 2016 of campaign money from local donors, and participated in several public debates with other Republican candidates:

- on June 8, 2016, sponsored by The Gazette newspaper and KKTV
- on June 22, 2016, sponsored by the Douglas County Republican Women's Forum in Castle Rock.
