= 1982 New Mexico Lobos football team =

American college football season

1982 New Mexico Lobos football
- Conference: Western Athletic Conference
- Record: 10–1 (6–1 WAC)
- Head coach: Joe Morrison (3rd season)
- Home stadium: University Stadium

1982 Western Athletic Conference football standings
| | Conf. | | | | | Overall |
| Team | W | | L | | T | W | | L | | T |
|---|---|---|---|---|---|---|---|---|---|---|
| BYU $ | 7 | – | 1 | – | 0 | 8 | – | 4 | – | 0 |
| New Mexico | 6 | – | 1 | – | 0 | 10 | – | 1 | – | 0 |
| Air Force | 4 | – | 3 | – | 0 | 8 | – | 5 | – | 0 |
| San Diego State | 4 | – | 3 | – | 0 | 7 | – | 5 | – | 0 |
| Hawaii | 4 | – | 4 | – | 0 | 6 | – | 5 | – | 0 |
| Colorado State | 3 | – | 5 | – | 0 | 4 | – | 7 | – | 0 |
| Utah | 2 | – | 4 | – | 0 | 5 | – | 6 | – | 0 |
| Wyoming | 2 | – | 6 | – | 0 | 5 | – | 7 | – | 0 |
| UTEP | 1 | – | 6 | – | 0 | 2 | – | 10 | – | 0 |
$ – Conference champion

The 1982 New Mexico Lobos football team represented the University of New Mexico in the Western Athletic Conference (WAC) during the 1982 NCAA Division I-A football season. In their third and final season under head coach Joe Morrison, the Lobos compiled a 10–1 record (6–1 against WAC opponents), finished in second place in the WAC, and outscored opponents, 374 to 225.

The team's statistical leaders included Dave Osborn with 1,609 passing yards, Mike D. Carter with 722 rushing yards and 739 receiving yards, and Pete Parks with 60 points scored.

== Schedule ==
| Date | Time | Opponent | Site | Result | Attendance | Source |
|---|---|---|---|---|---|---|
| September 4 | | at Wyoming | War Memorial Stadium; Laramie, WY | W 41–20 | 22,717 | |
| September 11 | | Texas Tech* | University Stadium; Albuquerque, NM | W 14–0 | 22,720 | |
| September 18 | | UNLV* | University Stadium; Albuquerque, NM | W 49–21 | 20,197 | |
| October 2 | 1:30 p.m. | at Air Force | Falcon Stadium; Colorado Springs, CO | W 49–37 | 25,576 | |
| October 9 | | BYU | University Stadium; Albuquerque, NM | L 12–40 | 31,002 | |
| October 16 | | at San Diego State | Jack Murphy Stadium; San Diego, CA | W 22–17 | 22,679 | |
| October 23 | | New Mexico State*^{†} | University Stadium; Albuquerque, NM | W 66–14 | 25,499 | |
| October 30 | 12:30 p.m. | at North Texas State* | Fouts Field; Denton, TX | W 20–17 | | |
| November 6 | | at UTEP | Sun Bowl; El Paso, TX | W 31–18 | 15,101 | |
| November 13 | | Colorado State | University Stadium; Albuquerque, NM | W 29–24 | 19,937 | |
| November 20 | | Hawaii | University Stadium; Albuquerque, NM | W 41–17 | 23,028 | |
*Non-conference game; ^{†}Homecoming; All times are in Mountain time
