= David Anderson (American football) =

American football player (born 1983)

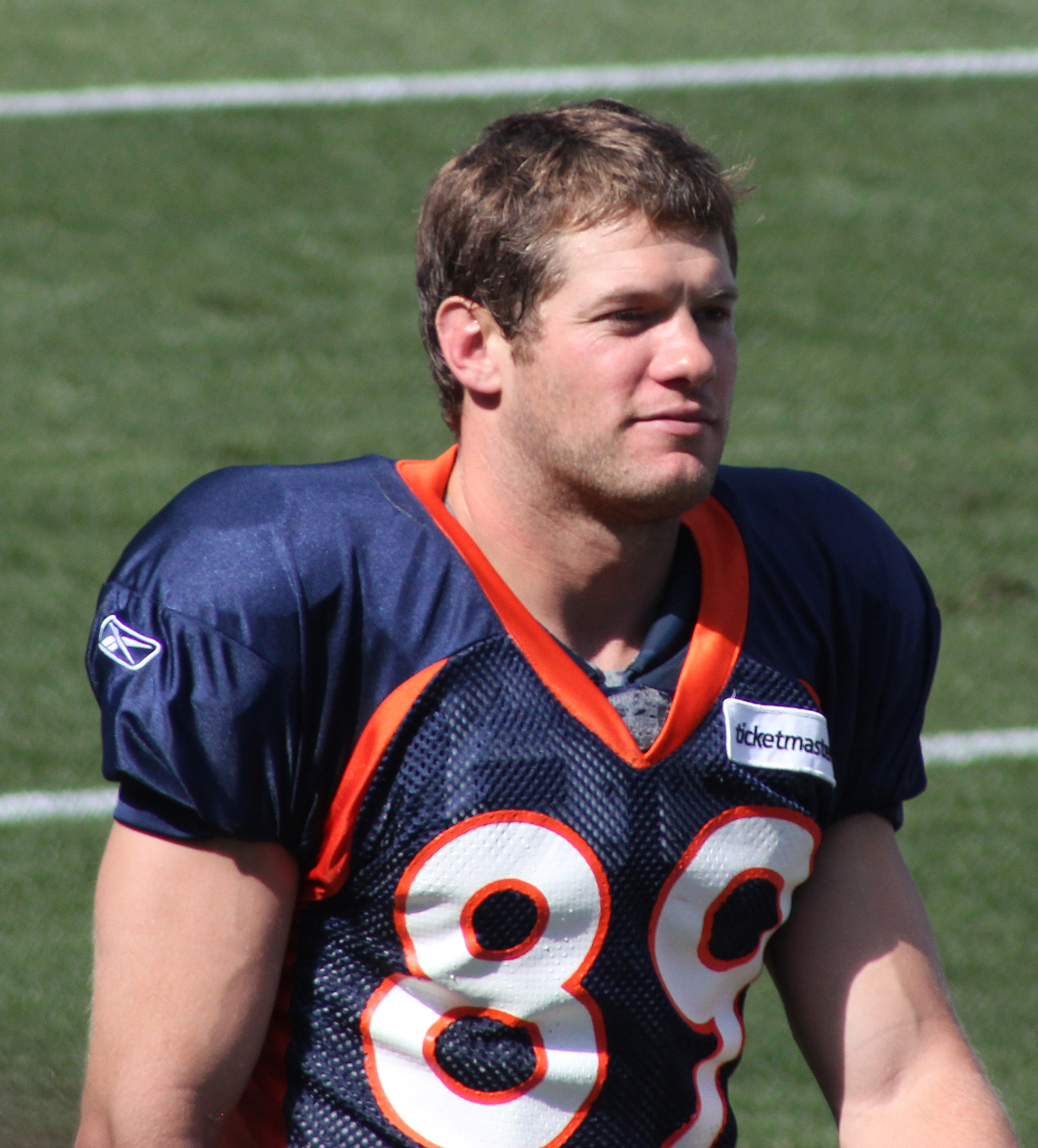
- Anderson with the Denver Broncos in the 2011 preseason

No. 88, 89, 14, 17
- Position: Wide receiver

Personal information
- Born: July 28, 1983 (age 43); Westlake Village, California, U.S.
- Listed height: 5 ft 10 in (1.78 m)
- Listed weight: 193 lb (88 kg)

Career information
- High school: Thousand Oaks (Thousand Oaks, California)
- College: Colorado State
- NFL draft: 2006: 7th round, 251st overall pick

Career history
- Houston Texans (2006–2010); Denver Broncos (2011)*; Houston Texans (2011); Washington Redskins (2011)
- * Offseason or practice squad member only

Awards and highlights
- First-team All-MW (2003); 2× Second-team All-MW (2004, 2005)

Career NFL statistics
- Receptions: 88
- Receiving yards: 965
- Receiving touchdowns: 4
- Stats at Pro Football Reference

David Kent Anderson (born July 28, 1983) is an American former professional football player who was a wide receiver in the National Football League (NFL). He was selected by the Houston Texans in the seventh round of the 2006 NFL draft. He played college football for the Colorado State Rams.

He was also a member of the Denver Broncos and Washington Redskins.

== Early life ==
Anderson played wide receiver for Thousand Oaks High School alongside future UCLA Bruins quarterback Ben Olson. He started in his sophomore year for the varsity team and earned 3 letters and multiple all-state honors.

== College career ==
Majoring in speech communication, Anderson was a standout wide receiver for the Colorado State Rams football team, finishing his career in 2005. He was listed as 5'11" weighing 195 lbs his senior year and wore number 4. Anderson played with notable quarterbacks Bradlee Van Pelt and Justin Holland and was coached by Sonny Lubick.

Anderson holds a number of school records for his on-field achievements: he is listed as number one and two in receptions in a season with 86 in 2005 and 75 in 2003. He has the number two and three spots for receptions in a single game, with 12 against both Colorado in 2005 and BYU in 2004. He holds the number one, two and eight positions for total yards gained per season with 1,282 (2003), 1,221 (2005) and 940 (2004). He's number one and six in touchdown receptions in a season with 10 (2003) and 8 (2005), numbers two, five and ten for receiving yards in a single game, with 233 against Brigham Young University in 2004, 199 against Air Force in 2003 and 169 against Wyoming in 2005.

Anderson is number one on the Rams all-time receiving lists for career yards (3,634) and career receptions (223). He was inducted to the Colorado State University Athletics Hall of Fame in 2017.

== Professional career ==
Pre-draft measurables
Height	Weight	Arm length	Hand span	40-yard dash	10-yard split	20-yard split	20-yard shuttle	Three-cone drill	Vertical jump	Broad jump
5 ft 10 1/2 in (1.79 m)	192 lb (87 kg)	29 7/8 in (0.76 m)	9 1/2 in (0.24 m)	4.58 s	1.58 s	2.69 s	4.20 s	6.88 s	34.0 in (0.86 m)	9 ft 11 in (3.02 m)
All values from NFL Combine/Pro Day

=== Houston Texans (first stint) ===
Anderson was selected by the Houston Texans in the seventh round of the 2006 NFL draft with the 251st overall pick. In 2006, he played nine games for the Texans, hauling in one pass reception and three kick returns. Each year after his 1-catch rookie campaign, he improved on his stats from the previous season through 2009. In 2007, he caught 12 passes on 17 targets for 131 yards and one touchdown. In 2008, he caught 19 of 29 targets for 241 yards and two touchdowns, then went 38 of 53 for 370 yards with no scores in 2009.

He was featured on Late Night with Conan O'Brien when he performed the host's original string dance after catching a touchdown against the Cincinnati Bengals on October 26, 2008.

Anderson was released by the Texans on July 30, 2011.

=== Denver Broncos ===
On July 30, 2011, after he was released by Houston, Anderson signed with the Denver Broncos. He was released by the Broncos on September 2, 2011.

=== Houston Texans (second stint) ===
Anderson was re-signed by the Texans on September 15, 2011, only to be cut on October 12, 2011, when the Houston Texans traded for Derrick Mason.

=== Washington Redskins ===
Anderson signed with the Washington Redskins on November 7, 2011.
