= Gartrell Johnson =

American football player (born 1986)

No. 33, 27
- Position: Running back

Personal information
- Born: June 21, 1986 (age 40); Miami, Florida, U.S.
- Listed height: 5 ft 10 in (1.78 m)
- Listed weight: 222 lb (101 kg)

Career information
- High school: Miami Springs (Miami Springs, Florida)
- College: Colorado State
- NFL draft: 2009: 4th round, 134th overall pick

Career history
- San Diego Chargers (2009)*; New York Giants (2009); Atlanta Falcons (2010)
- * Offseason or practice squad member only

Awards and highlights
- First-team All-MW (2008)

Career NFL statistics
- Rushing attempts: 23
- Rushing yards: 79
- Stats at Pro Football Reference

Gartrell Godfrey Johnson, III (born June 21, 1986) is an American former professional football player who was a running back in the National Football League (NFL). He was selected by the San Diego Chargers in the fourth round of the 2009 NFL draft. He played college football for the Colorado State Rams. Johnson was also a member of the New York Giants and Atlanta Falcons.

== Early life ==
As a senior at Miami Springs High School in 2003, he was Dade County's leading rusher with 1,649 yards and accounted for 18 touchdowns. For his performance, he earned all-Conference and all-State honors and also holds Miami Springs High's single-season rushing record, especially significant considering that Miami Springs was also the high school attended by Willis McGahee, Mitch Green, Jon Lewis, Dwayne Hadley, and Freddie Myles. Buddy Goins was his coach at MSHS.

== College career ==
He ended his five-year career at Colorado State University with an outstanding 2008 campaign for which he received first-team All-MWC honors. Johnson accounted for over 3,000 yards of total offense and 26 touchdowns in his college career. Johnson became the first player to lead CSU in rushing for three straight seasons since E.J. Watson (1993–95), and recorded CSU's first 1,000-yard season since Kyle Bell in 2005. He showed an astonishing performance in the 2008 New Mexico Bowl when he rushed for 286 yards and two touchdowns, also receiving five passes for 90 yards, he sealed the game on a 77-yard touchdown with 1:46 remaining earning Offensive MVP honors. His 375 all-purpose yards ranks second all-time in a bowl game, behind East Carolina's Chris Johnson, who had 408 all-purpose yards; 153 in kickoff returns in the 2007 Hawaii Bowl. He was named Team's Fum McGraw MVP as senior.

=== Statistics ===
Year	Team	Rushing								Receiving					Total			
Year	Team	GP	GS	Att	Yards	Avg	TD	Long	Avg/G	Rec	Yards	Avg	TD	Long	Touch	Yards	TD	Avg/G
2004	Colorado State	1	0	2	12	6.0	0	5	12.0	1	-2	-2.0	0	-2	3	10	0	10
2005	Colorado State	3	0	11	26	2.4	0	7	8.7	0	0	0	0	0	11	26	0	8.6
2006	Colorado State	12	7	109	305	2.8	6	15	25.4	5	41	8.2	0	13	114	346	6	28.8
2007	Colorado State	12	7	181	957	5.3	6	45	79.8	12	103	8.6	2	31	193	1,060	8	88.3
2008	Colorado State	13	13	278	1,476	5.3	12	77	113.5	32	295	9.2	0	57	310	1,771	12	136.2
Totals		41	27	581	2,776	4.8	24	77	67.7	50	437	8.7	2	57	631	3,213	26	78.4

== Professional career ==
Pre-draft measurables
Height	Weight	40-yard dash	10-yard split	20-yard split	Vertical jump	Broad jump	Bench press
5 ft 10 1/4 in (1.78 m)	219 lb (99 kg)	4.75 s	1.56 s	2.68 s	34 in (0.86 m)	9 ft 6 in (2.90 m)	20 reps
All values from NFL Combine.

=== San Diego Chargers ===
Johnson was selected by the San Diego Chargers in the fourth round (134th overall) of the 2009 NFL draft. After being inactive for the Chargers first game of the season, he was waived on September 14, 2009.

=== New York Giants ===
Johnson was claimed off waivers by the New York Giants on September 15, 2009. Johnson recorded his first regular season NFL carry with the Giants in 2009. He finished the year averaging 3.3 yards per carry; gaining 43 yards on 13 rushing attempts.

=== Atlanta Falcons ===
Johnson signed with the Atlanta Falcons on September 21, 2010. In the 2010 season, Gartrell carried the ball 10 times for 36 yards. He was waived on September 2, 2011.
