= Garrett Grayson =

American football player (born 1991)

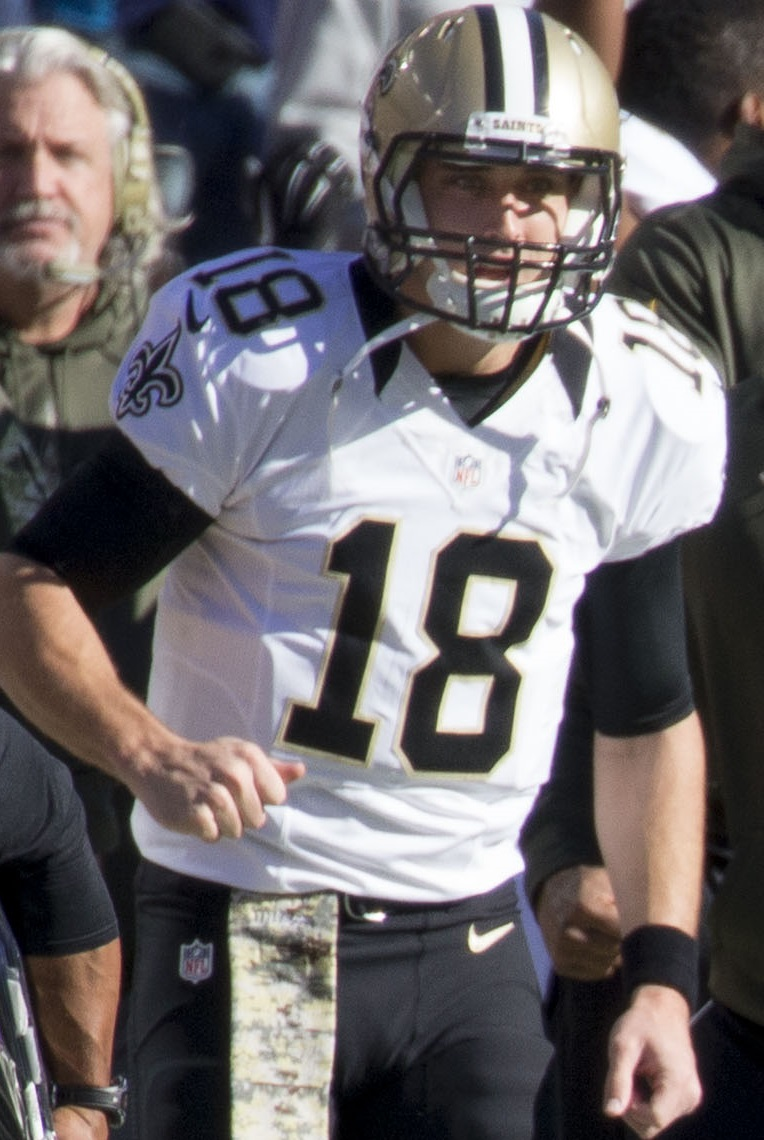
- Grayson with the New Orleans Saints in 2015

No. 18, 9, 5, 2
- Position: Quarterback

Personal information
- Born: May 29, 1991 (age 35); Vancouver, Washington, U.S.
- Listed height: 6 ft 2 in (1.88 m)
- Listed weight: 213 lb (97 kg)

Career information
- High school: Heritage (Vancouver, Washington)
- College: Colorado State (2011–2014)
- NFL draft: 2015: 3rd round, 75th overall pick

Career history
- New Orleans Saints (2015–2016); Atlanta Falcons (2017–2018)*; Denver Broncos (2018–2019)*
- * Offseason or practice squad member only

Awards and highlights
- MW Offensive Player of the Year (2014); First-team All-MW (2014)
- Stats at Pro Football Reference

Garrett Bradley Grayson (born May 29, 1991) is an American former professional football player who was a quarterback in the National Football League (NFL). He played college football for the Colorado State Rams. He was selected by the New Orleans Saints in the third round of the 2015 NFL draft, but he never played in a regular season NFL game.

== Early life ==
Grayson attended Heritage High School in Vancouver, Washington, where he was a three-sport standout in football, basketball, and track. In football, he was a three-year starting quarterback and three-year letterwinner, also played free safety, cornerback and wide receiver, and served two seasons as a team captain. He guided the Timberwolves to three straight Class 4A playoff berths and a GSHL championship in 2008. He broke most of Washington's Class 4A state passing records, and had the nation's highest completion percentage as a senior (73.2 percent), topping over 10,000 yards in total offense during his career. He garnered consecutive Greater St. Helens League MVP honors, in 2008 and 2009.

Also a standout track & field athlete, Grayson lettered all four years competing in sprinting, hurdling, jumping and relays events. His personal records include 110 hurdles (15.20 s) and 300 hurdles (40.57 s) In sprints, he ran the 100-meter dash in 11.03 seconds and the 200-meter dash in 24.00 seconds. In addition, he also clocked a 4.6-second 40-yard dash, bench-pressed 290 pounds, squatted 430 and had a 38-inch vertical jump.

Grayson was ranked by Rivals.com as a three-star recruit and the 22nd best dual-threat quarterback in his class. He was ranked the No. 17 overall prospect from the state of Washington. He chose to attend Colorado State over scholarship offers from Miami (OH), Eastern Washington, and Idaho State.

== College career ==
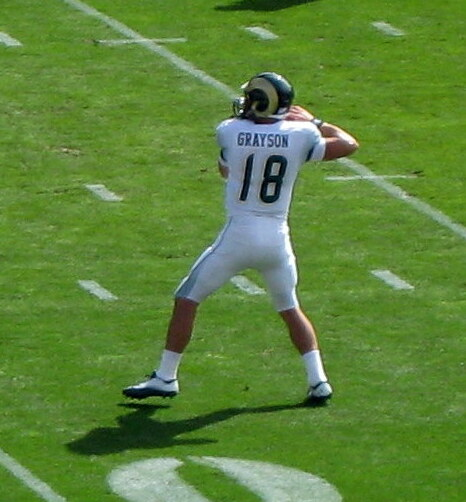
Grayson with Colorado State in 2011

=== 2011 season ===
As a true freshman at Colorado State University in 2011, Grayson started three of four games he played in, going 0-3. He completed 43 of his 77 pass attempts for 542 yards, two touchdowns, and six interceptions. Among those games, he threw for 3 interceptions in a loss vs Wyoming.

=== 2012 season ===
Grayson entered his sophomore season in 2012 as the starter. His lone win as a starter came in the team's season opener against in-state rival Colorado, in which CSU won 22-17, but they lost to FCS team North Dakota State. He was injured in the team's fifth game in a loss at Air Force, in which he suffered a broken collarbone. He appeared in only one game as a backup after that. Overall, he appeared in six games, going 78 of 138 for 946 yards with seven touchdowns and three interceptions.

=== 2013 season ===
Grayson started all 14 games as a junior in 2013. He finished the year with a school record 3,696 passing yards. He also had 23 touchdowns. In a poor performance at Utah State, Grayson threw 2 interceptions as the Rams were shut out 13-0. The Rams played in the New Mexico Bowl that year against Washington State, where CSU won 48-45, while storming back from 35-13 and 45-30 down, to kick a walk off 41 yard field goal.

=== 2014 season ===
Grayson returned as a starter in 2014. In game 7 against Utah State, Grayson passed Kelly Stouffer to become Colorado State's all-time passing yards leader. In addition, his 4,006 passing yards and 32 passing touchdowns that year are the highest in Colorado State history. He was also chosen to play in the 2015 Senior Bowl for that year.

=== Statistics ===
Year	Team	Passing								Rushing			
Year	Team	Cmp	Att	Pct	Yds	Y/A	TD	Int	Rtg	Att	Yds	Avg	TD
2011	Colorado State	43	77	55.8	542	7.0	2	6	108.0	47	193	4.1	1
2012	Colorado State	78	138	56.5	946	6.9	7	3	126.5	39	17	0.4	1
2013	Colorado State	297	478	62.1	3,696	7.7	23	11	138.4	69	119	1.7	2
2014	Colorado State	270	420	64.3	4,006	9.5	32	7	166.2	57	−46	−0.8	0
Career		688	1,113	61.8	9,190	8.3	64	27	145.3	212	283	1.3	4

== Professional career ==
Pre-draft measurables
Height	Weight	40-yard dash	10-yard split	20-yard split	20-yard shuttle	Three-cone drill	Vertical jump	Broad jump	Wonderlic
6 ft 2 in (1.88 m)	213 lb (97 kg)	4.75 s	1.62 s	2.75 s	4.35 s	6.97 s	34 in (0.86 m)	10 ft 1 in (3.07 m)	20
All values from Colorado State Pro Day

=== New Orleans Saints ===
The New Orleans Saints drafted Grayson in the third round, 75th overall, in the 2015 NFL draft. He spent the 2015 season as the Saints' third-string quarterback, but did not play in any games.

On September 7, 2016, Grayson was released by the Saints and was re-signed to the practice squad. He signed a reserve/future contract with the Saints on January 2, 2017. Grayson was waived by New Orleans on September 2.

=== Atlanta Falcons ===
On October 17, 2017, Grayson was signed to the Atlanta Falcons' practice squad. He was released on November 8, but was re-signed to the practice squad six days later. Grayson signed a reserve/future contract with the Falcons on January 15, 2018. On September 1, Grayson was waived by the Falcons.

=== Salt Lake Stallions ===
In September 2018, Grayson signed with the Salt Lake Stallions of the Alliance of American Football (AAF). His contract was made void after signing to the Denver Broncos practice squad.

=== Denver Broncos ===
On October 25, 2018, Grayson was signed to the Broncos' practice squad. On January 2, 2019, Grayson was re-signed to reserve/future contract. On May 2, the Broncos waived Grayson.

On August 8, 2019, it was reported that Grayson confirmed he was "stepping away" from football after declining an offer from the Falcons.
