= Raymond Jackson (American football) =

American football player and executive (born 1973)

Denver Broncos
- Title: Vice president of player development

Personal information
- Born: January 17, 1973 (age 53); East Side, Chicago, Illinois, U.S.
- Listed height: 5 ft 10 in (1.78 m)
- Listed weight: 189 lb (86 kg)

Career information
- Position: Cornerback (No. 31)
- High school: Montbello (Denver, Colorado)
- College: Colorado State
- NFL draft: 1996: 5th round, 156th overall pick
- Expansion draft: 1999: 1st round, 22nd overall pick

Career history

Playing
- Buffalo Bills (1996–1998); Cleveland Browns (1999–2001)

Operations
- Cleveland Browns (2002–2004) Player development coordinator; Pittsburgh Steelers (2005–2014) Director of player development; Denver Broncos (2015–present); Director of player development (2015–2020); Vice president of player development (2021–present)

Awards and highlights
- As an executive: Super Bowl champion (50)

Career NFL statistics
- Tackles: 55
- Interceptions: 6
- Pass deflections: 4
- Stats at Pro Football Reference

Raymond DeWayne Jackson (born February 17, 1973) is an American professional football executive and former cornerback who is the vice president of player development for the Denver Broncos of the National Football League (NFL). He was selected by the Buffalo Bills in the fifth round of the 1996 NFL draft. He played college football for the Colorado State Rams. Jackson was inducted into the Colorado State Rams Hall of Fame in 2011. Jackson also played in the NFL for the Cleveland Browns.

Pre-draft measurables
Height	Weight	Arm length	Hand span	40-yard dash	10-yard split	20-yard split	20-yard shuttle	Vertical jump	Broad jump	Bench press
5 ft 10 1/8 in (1.78 m)	190 lb (86 kg)	33 3/4 in (0.86 m)	9 1/2 in (0.24 m)	4.66 s	1.60 s	2.70 s	4.41 s	36.5 in (0.93 m)	10 ft 0 in (3.05 m)	13 reps
All values from NFL Combine
