= Kevin McLain =

American football player (born 1954)

No. 50
- Position: Linebacker

Personal information
- Born: September 15, 1954 (age 72); Tulsa, Oklahoma, U.S.
- Listed height: 6 ft 2 in (1.88 m)
- Listed weight: 230 lb (104 kg)

Career information
- High school: Loara (CA)
- College: Colorado State
- NFL draft: 1976: 1st round, 26th overall pick

Career history
- Los Angeles Rams (1976–1979)

Awards and highlights
- First-team All-American (1975)

Career NFL statistics
- Games played: 48
- Stats at Pro Football Reference

Kevin Wayne McLain (born September 15, 1954) is an American former professional football player who was a linebacker in the National Football League (NFL). He was a 1st round selection (26th overall pick) in the 1976 NFL draft out of Colorado State University. McLain played for the Los Angeles Rams from 1976 to 1979.
