= Greg Primus =

American football player (born 1970)

No. 18, 87
- Position: Wide receiver

Personal information
- Born: October 20, 1970 (age 56); Denver, Colorado, U.S.
- Listed height: 5 ft 11 in (1.80 m)
- Listed weight: 188 lb (85 kg)

Career information
- High school: George Washington (CO)
- College: Colorado State
- NFL draft: 1993: undrafted

Career history
- Denver Broncos (1993)*; Chicago Bears (1994–1995)
- * Offseason or practice squad member only

Career NFL statistics
- Receptions: 3
- Receiving yards: 25
- Return yards: 39
- Stats at Pro Football Reference

Greg Primus (born October 20, 1970) is an American former professional football player who was a wide receiver for the Chicago Bears of the National Football League (NFL). Primus attended George Washington High School in Denver and played college football for the Colorado State Rams.
