= Damon Washington =

American football player (born 1977)

No. 29
- Position: Running back

Personal information
- Born: February 20, 1977 (age 49); Lockney, Texas, U.S.
- Listed height: 5 ft 11 in (1.80 m)
- Listed weight: 193 lb (88 kg)

Career information
- High school: Southwest (San Diego, California)
- College: Colorado State
- NFL draft: 1999: undrafted

Career history
- Chicago Bears (1999)*; St. Louis Rams (2000)*; New York Giants (2000–2002)
- * Offseason or practice squad member only

Career NFL statistics
- Games played: 25
- Rushing attempts: 28
- Rushing yards: 89
- Stats at Pro Football Reference

Damon Keane Washington (born February 20, 1977) is an American former professional football player who was a running back for the New York Giants of the National Football League (NFL). He played college football for the Colorado State Rams. He was inducted into the Colorado State University Athletics Hall of Fame in 2012.

Washington attended Southwest Senior High School in San Diego, setting school records for rushing yards in a game (346) and a season (1,533).
