= Mark Bell (wide receiver) =

American football player (born 1957)

No. 81
- Position: Wide receiver

Personal information
- Born: June 14, 1957 (age 69); Jamestown, Ohio, U.S.
- Listed height: 5 ft 9 in (1.75 m)
- Listed weight: 175 lb (79 kg)

Career information
- High school: Lynwood (Lynwood, California)
- College: Colorado State
- NFL draft: 1979: 5th round, 130th overall pick

Career history
- St. Louis Cardinals (1980–1981)

Career NFL statistics
- Receptions: 8
- Receiving yards: 123
- Stats at Pro Football Reference

Mark Ricardo Bell (born June 14, 1957) is an American former professional football player who was a wide receiver and punt returner for two seasons with the St. Louis Cardinals of the National Football League (NFL). He played college football for the Colorado State Rams.

== College career ==
Bell attended Colorado State University, and played four years with the Rams. His standout season was his junior year in 1977, during which he made 40 receptions for 797 yards and nine touchdowns, earning All-WAC team honors.

He was one of three Colorado State players with the surname Bell who were selected during the 1979 NFL draft.

== Professional career ==
Bell was selected in the fifth round of the 1979 NFL draft by the St. Louis Cardinals. He played parts of two seasons with the Cardinals, and was released after one game in the 1981 season.
