= Mark Driscoll (American football) =

American football player, coach, and executive (born 1953)

Profile
- Position: Quarterback

Personal information
- Born: July 28, 1953 (age 73); La Junta, Colorado, U.S.
- Listed height: 6 ft 1 in (1.85 m)
- Listed weight: 184 lb (83 kg)

Career information
- High school: La Junta (CO)
- College: Colorado State
- NFL draft: 1976: 13th round, 374th overall pick

Career history

Playing
- Dallas Cowboys (1976)*; San Francisco 49ers (1976)*
- * Offseason or practice squad member only

Coaching
- Colorado State University (1977–1979) Wide receivers coach

Operations
- Colorado State University (2003–2006) Athletic director

Mark Driscoll (born July 28, 1953) is an American former college football quarterback and athletic director at Colorado State University.

== Early life ==
Driscoll was born at La Junta, Colorado, where he became a starter at quarterback as a senior.

He accepted a football scholarship from Colorado State University. As a sophomore in 1972, he was coming off the bench behind quarterback Pat Juliana as a pass specialist, to spark the team in some games before suffering a shoulder sprain. In 1973, he was forced to redshirt to recover from the right shoulder surgery he had the previous year.

As a junior in 1974, he came off the bench in the third quarter of the fourth game against Brigham Young University who were winning 26-6, proceeding to replace starter Jack Graham. He made 18 out 31 completions for 265 yards and a school record 4 touchdowns, in rallying the Rams to a 33-33 tie. He was named the starter for the next game against Utah State University, passing over Jan Stubbe who was the nation's No. 9 passer the previous season. He ended up helping his team lead the nation in passing and break multiple school records by making 122 completions for 2,016 yards, 19 touchdowns and 12 interceptions. He also had the school's first 300-yard passing game.

As a senior in 1975, he posted 227 completions for 1,246 yards, 4 touchdowns and 11 interceptions. He was named to the WAC All-academic team and received an NCAA post-graduate scholarship award.

He left as the school's All-time passing and total offense leader, along with 14 passing records, after registering 283 completions for 3,923 yards, 25 touchdowns and 34 interceptions. He also finished seventh All-time in WAC career passing yards (3,923) and total offense (3,780).

== Professional career ==
Driscoll was selected by the Dallas Cowboys in the thirteenth round (374th overall) of the 1976 NFL draft. He was waived before the start of the season on July 15.

On July 19, he was signed as a free agent by the San Francisco 49ers, but was released on August 3.

== Personal life ==
In 1976, he joined the Colorado State University coaching staff as a graduate assistant. In 1977, he was promoted to wide receivers coach. In 1980, he left to work in the banking business.

Driscoll was the school's athletic director from 2003 to 2006, before resigning to be the Colorado market president for First National Bank of Omaha. He also served as a color analyst on radio broadcasts of Colorado State football games.
