= Bradlee Van Pelt =

American football player (born 1980)

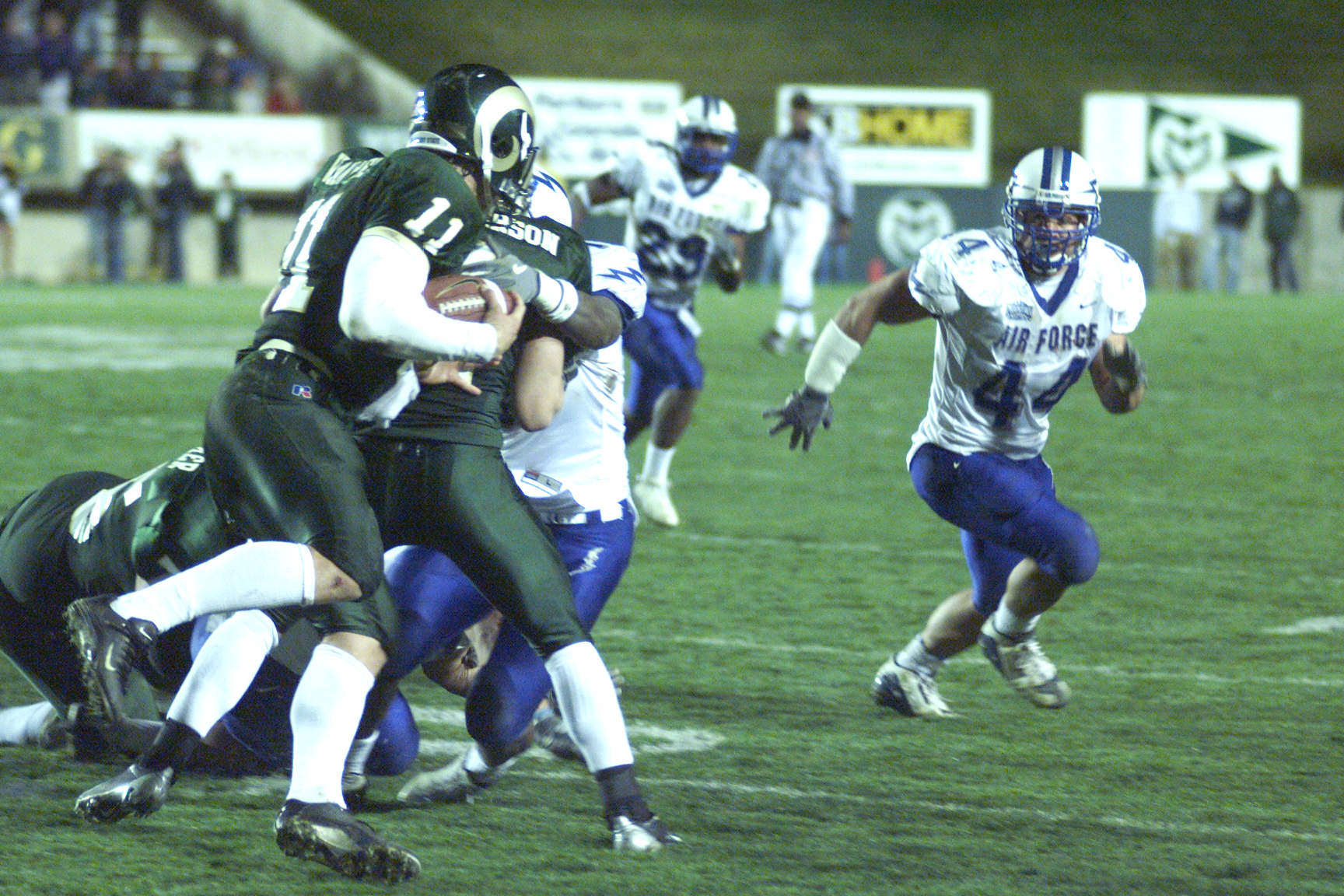
- Van Pelt (#11) against Air Force in 2003

No. 11, 9
- Positions: Quarterback, safety

Personal information
- Born: July 3, 1980 (age 46); Owosso, Michigan, U.S.
- Listed height: 6 ft 2 in (1.88 m)
- Listed weight: 220 lb (100 kg)

Career information
- High school: San Marcos (Santa Barbara, California)
- College: Michigan State (1999–2000); Colorado State (2001–2003)
- NFL draft: 2004: 7th round, 250th overall pick

Career history
- Denver Broncos (2004–2006); Houston Texans (2006); Bergamo Lions (2009–2010); Leicester Falcons (2010)

Awards and highlights
- 2× MW Offensive Player of the Year (2002, 2003); 2× First-team All-MW (2002, 2003); Colorado State Rams Hall of Fame; Colorado State Rams Ring of Honor

Career NFL statistics
- Comp-Att: 2–8
- Passing yards: 8
- TD–INT: 0–0
- Passer rating: 39.6
- Rushing attempts: 11
- Rushing yards: 48
- Stats at Pro Football Reference

Bradlee Van Pelt (born July 3, 1980) is an American former professional football player who was a quarterback and safety in the National Football League (NFL). He played college football for the Michigan State Spartans and Colorado State Rams. Van Pelt was selected by the Denver Broncos in the seventh round of the 2004 NFL draft, and was also a member of the Houston Texans. Afterwards, he played overseas with the Bergamo Lions of the Italian Football League and Leicester Falcons of the BAFA National Leagues in Great Britain.

Van Pelt is currently working for Sky Sports in the United Kingdom as a studio analyst for their NFL programming. He is the son of late NFL linebacker Brad Van Pelt.

== Early life ==
Van Pelt attended San Marcos High School in Santa Barbara, California, where he played quarterback and safety. There he earned accolades with spots on PrepStar's All-Western and SuperPrep's All-Far West Region Teams and being named a first-team all-state selection as an athlete. In 1998, during his senior season, he completed 89-of-155 passes (.574) for 1,265 yards and 13 touchdowns and rushed for 1,294 yards and 24 TDs; on defense, he had 41 tackles and three interceptions.

== College career ==
Van Pelt originally joined the college program where his father was an All-American, Michigan State. The head coach at the time was Nick Saban, who departed after Van Pelt's first season to coach LSU. However, after he was pressured to convert from quarterback to defensive back, he opted to transfer to Colorado State where he was given the opportunity to play quarterback.

At Colorado State Van Pelt was twice named the Mountain West Conference player of the year and managed to throw for nearly 3,000 yards and over 60% completion rate his senior year, and came within 100 yards in passing and rushing of becoming the first collegiate quarterback to pass for 3,000 yards and rush for 1,000 yards in the same season. In 2005 Vince Young passed for 3,036 yards and rushed for 1,050. He was inducted to the Colorado State Rams Hall Of Fame in 2013, and was inducted as a member of Colorado State's inaugural Ring of Honor in 2025.

== Professional career ==
Pre-draft measurables
Height	Weight	Arm length	Hand span	40-yard dash	10-yard split	20-yard split	20-yard shuttle	Three-cone drill	Vertical jump	Broad jump
6 ft 2 1/4 in (1.89 m)	231 lb (105 kg)	30 5/8 in (0.78 m)	9 5/8 in (0.24 m)	4.96 s	1.75 s	2.88 s	4.11 s	6.89 s	33.5 in (0.85 m)	9 ft 7 in (2.92 m)
All values from NFL Combine

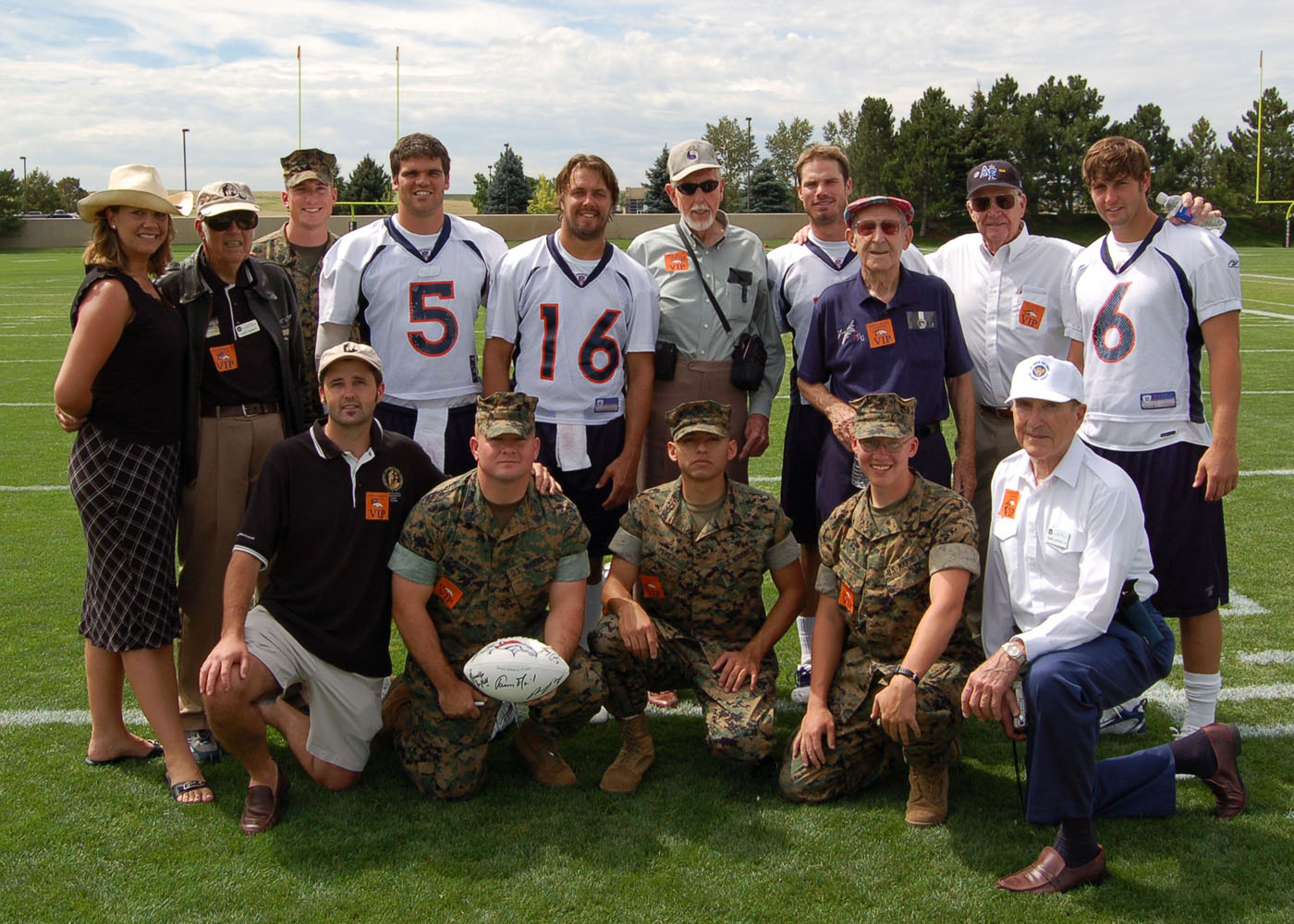
Van Pelt (back row, fourth from right) in 2006

NFL scouts criticized Van Pelt for his "run first, then throw" mentality while playing quarterback for Colorado State. He was drafted by the Denver Broncos in the seventh round (250th overall) of the 2004 NFL draft, where he spent the next two years as a backup. In the 2006 NFL draft, the Broncos drafted Vanderbilt quarterback Jay Cutler. In training camp, Cutler moved ahead of Van Pelt on the depth chart making Van Pelt the third-string quarterback, behind Jake Plummer and Cutler. He was released by the Denver Broncos on September 2, 2006. His attempt to make the team was chronicled in Stefan Fatsis's book A Few Seconds of Panic.

Van Pelt was then signed by the Houston Texans on November 27, 2006, to be their third-string quarterback, brought in by his former coach in Denver, Gary Kubiak. He was released by the Texans on August 27, 2007.

It was announced on March 8, 2009, that Van Pelt would attempt a comeback as a safety with the Broncos, though he failed to make the roster.

In late 2009, it was announced that Van Pelt had signed with the Bergamo Lions of Italian Football League for their 2009 & 2010 Italian and Eurobowl campaigns. He would play quarterback and assist on defense as a safety.

At the end of the Italian season in July 2010, he signed to play for the Leicester Falcons in the BAFA Community Leagues Division 1 (second highest level league in Britain), leading the team to the Division 1 playoffs.

After retiring from football, Van Pelt moved to Santa Barbara, California, and occasionally provides football commentary for Sky Sports.
