= 1982 Colorado State Rams football team =

American college football season

1982 Colorado State Rams football
- Conference: Western Athletic Conference
- Record: 4–7 (3–5 WAC)
- Head coach: Leon Fuller (1st season)
- Offensive coordinator: Sonny Lubick (1st season)
- Defensive coordinator: Gary Sloan (1st season)
- Home stadium: Hughes Stadium

1982 Western Athletic Conference football standings
	Conf.					Overall
Team	W		L		T	W		L		T
BYU $	7	–	1	–	0	8	–	4	–	0
New Mexico	6	–	1	–	0	10	–	1	–	0
Air Force	4	–	3	–	0	8	–	5	–	0
San Diego State	4	–	3	–	0	7	–	5	–	0
Hawaii	4	–	4	–	0	6	–	5	–	0
Colorado State	3	–	5	–	0	4	–	7	–	0
Utah	2	–	4	–	0	5	–	6	–	0
Wyoming	2	–	6	–	0	5	–	7	–	0
UTEP	1	–	6	–	0	2	–	10	–	0
$ – Conference champion

The 1982 Colorado State Rams football team represented Colorado State University in the Western Athletic Conference during the 1982 NCAA Division I-A football season. In their first season under head coach Leon Fuller, the Rams compiled a 4–7 record.

== Schedule ==
Date	Time	Opponent	Site	Result	Attendance	Source
September 4		at Missouri*	Faurot Field; Columbia, MO	L 14–28	50,015	
September 11		Wyoming	Hughes Stadium; Fort Collins, CO (rivalry)	W 9–3	28,652	
September 18		Hawaii	Hughes Stadium; Fort Collins, CO	L 13–23	24,290	
September 25		New Mexico State*	Hughes Stadium; Fort Collins, CO	W 28–17	23,129	
October 1		at Utah	Robert Rice Stadium; Salt Lake City, UT	L 14–35	28,603	
October 16	1:30 p.m.	at Air Force	Falcon Stadium; Colorado Springs, CO (rivalry)	W 21–11	25,326	
October 23		at BYU	Cougar Stadium; Provo, UT	L 18–34	64,739	
October 30		UTEP	Hughes Stadium; Fort Collins, CO	W 38–13	24,074	
November 6		UNLV*	Hughes Stadium; Fort Collins, CO	L 31–36	19,108	
November 13		at New Mexico	University Stadium; Albuquerque, NM	L 24–29	19,937	
November 20		at San Diego State	Jack Murphy Stadium; San Diego, CA	L 10–38	18,244	
*Non-conference game; All times are in Mountain time
