= 2001 BYU Cougars football team =

American college football season

2001 BYU Cougars football

MW champion

Liberty Bowl, L 10–28 vs. Louisville
- Conference: Mountain West Conference

Ranking
- Coaches: No. 24
- AP: No. 25
- Record: 12–2 (7–0 MW)
- Head coach: Gary Crowton (1st season)
- Offensive coordinator: Mike Borich (1st season)
- Offensive scheme: Spread
- Defensive coordinator: Ken Schmidt (11th season)
- Base defense: 4–3
- Home stadium: LaVell Edwards Stadium

2001 Mountain West Conference football standings
	Conf.			Overall
Team	W		L	W		L
No. 25 BYU $	7	–	0	12	–	2
Colorado State	5	–	2	7	–	5
Utah	4	–	3	8	–	4
New Mexico	4	–	3	6	–	5
Air Force	3	–	4	6	–	6
UNLV	3	–	4	4	–	7
San Diego State	2	–	5	3	–	8
Wyoming	0	–	7	2	–	9
$ – Conference champion; Rankings from AP Poll

The 2001 BYU Cougars football team represented Brigham Young University during the 2001 NCAA Division I-A football season. This was the first BYU team without LaVell Edwards as the head coach in 30 years.

== Schedule ==
Date	Time	Opponent	Rank	Site	TV	Result	Attendance	Source
August 25	2:30 pm	Tulane*		LaVell Edwards Stadium; Provo, UT (BCA Classic)	ESPN2	W 70–35	49,008	
September 1	7:00 pm	Nevada*		LaVell Edwards Stadium; Provo, UT	SWP	W 52–7	56,286	
September 8	3:30 pm	at California*		California Memorial Stadium; Berkeley, CA	SWP	W 44–16	33,043	
September 29	5:00 pm	at UNLV	No. 20	Sam Boyd Stadium; Las Vegas, NV	ABC	W 35–31	32,601	
October 5	7:00 pm	Utah State*	No. 20	LaVell Edwards Stadium; Provo, UT (rivalry)	SWP	W 54–34	65,396	
October 13	1:00 pm	at New Mexico	No. 18	University Stadium; Albuquerque, NM	ESPN Plus	W 24–20	29,036	
October 20	3:45 pm	Air Force	No. 18	LaVell Edwards Stadium; Provo, UT	ESPN2	W 63–33	62,382	
October 27	7:00 pm	at San Diego State	No. 16	Qualcomm Stadium; San Diego, CA	SWP	W 59–21	30,064	
November 1	7:45 pm	Colorado State	No. 13	LaVell Edwards Stadium; Provo, UT	ESPN2	W 56–34	63,478	
November 10	1:00 pm	at Wyoming	No. 9	War Memorial Stadium; Laramie, WY	ESPN Plus	W 41–34	15,277	
November 17	5:00 pm	Utah	No. 8	LaVell Edwards Stadium; Provo, UT (Holy War)	ESPN2	W 24–21	66,149	
December 1	6:00 pm	at Mississippi State*	No. 10	Davis Wade Stadium; Starkville, MS	ESPN2	W 41–38	44,260	
December 8	2:00 pm	at Hawaii*	No. 9	Aloha Stadium; Halawa, HI	ESPN2	L 45–72	50,000	
December 31	2:00 pm	vs. No. 23 Louisville*	No. 19	Liberty Bowl Memorial Stadium; Memphis, TN (Liberty Bowl)	ESPN	L 10–28	58,968	
*Non-conference game; Rankings from AP Poll released prior to the game; All times are in Mountain time

•SportsWest Productions (SWP) games were shown locally on KSL 5.

== Game summaries ==
=== Tulane ===
Team	1	2	3	4	Total
Tulane	21	7	7	0	35
• BYU	21	28	14	7	70

- Date: August 25
- Location: LaVell Edwards Stadium, Provo, UT
- Game start: 2:36 p.m. MDT
- Elapsed time: 3:42
- Game attendance: 61,930
- Game weather: 91 °F (33 °C), Sunny, wind NW 2–5 mph (3.2–8.0 km/h)
- Referee: David Neal
- TV announcers (ESPN2): Mark Jones, Todd Christensen, Dave Ryan

Scoring summary
1	13:56	TU	Mewelde Moore 75-yard run (Seth Marler kick)	TU 7-0
1	11:46	BYU	Luke Staley 2-yard run (Matt Payne kick)	TIED 7-7
1	8:27	TU	Kris Coleman 3-yard run (Seth Marler kick)	TU 14-7
1	4:41	BYU	Luke Staley 29-yard run (Matt Payne kick)	TIED 14-14
1	2:54	BYU	Luke Staley 65-yard run (Matt Payne kick)	BYU 21-14
1	0:54	TU	Royde Williams 5-yard pass from Patrick Ramsey (Seth Marler kick)	TIED 21-21
2	14:56	BYU	Spencer Nead 8-yard pass from Brandon Doman (Matt Payne kick)	BYU 28-21
2	10:09	BYU	Gabriel Reid 13-yard pass from Brandon Doman (Matt Payne kick)	BYU 35-21
2	5:52	BYU	Spencer Nead 52-yard pass from Brandon Doman (Matt Payne kick)	BYU 42-21
2	1:26	TU	Mewelde Moore 10-yard pass from Patrick Ramsey (Seth Marler kick)	BYU 42-28
2	0:42	BYU	Brian McDonald 26-yard run (Matt Payne kick)	BYU 49-28
3	13:04	BYU	Brandon Doman 14-yard run (Matt Payne kick)	BYU 56-28
3	8:01	TU	Mewelde Moore 15-yard pass from Patrick Ramsey (Seth Marler kick)	BYU 56-35
3	5:43	BYU	Brian McDonald 1-yard run (Matt Payne kick)	BYU 63-35
4	9:25	BYU	Brian McDonald 5-yard run (Matt Payne kick)	BYU 70-35

=== Nevada ===
Team	1	2	3	4	Total
Nevada	0	0	0	7	7
• BYU	10	28	14	0	52

- Date: September 1
- Location: LaVell Edwards Stadium, Provo, UT
- Game start: 7:06 p.m. MDT
- Elapsed time: 3:09
- Game attendance: 56,286
- Game weather: 84 °F (29 °C), Clear
- Referee: Clair Gausman
- TV announcers (SportsWest): Tom Kirkland, Blaine Fowler

Scoring summary
1	11:59	BYU	Luke Staley 8-yard run (Matt Payne kick)	BYU 7-0
1	2:00	BYU	Matt Payne 27-yard field goal	BYU 10-0
2	13:09	BYU	Luke Staley 44-yard run (Matt Payne kick)	BYU 17-0
2	10:59	BYU	Brian McDonald 5-yard run (Matt Payne kick)	BYU 24-0
2	3:55	BYU	Reno Mahe 12-yard pass from Brandon Doman (Matt Payne kick)	BYU 31-0
2	0:39	BYU	Brian McDonald 1-yard run (Matt Payne kick)	BYU 38-0
3	12:48	BYU	Rod Wilkerson 53-yard pass from Charlie Peterson (Matt Payne kick)	BYU 45-0
2	3:55	BYU	Charlie Peterson 2-yard run (Matt Payne kick)	BYU 52-0
4	6:52	UNR	Zac Threadgill 10-yard run (Damon Fine kick)	BYU 52-7

=== California ===
Team	1	2	3	4	Total
• BYU	0	21	20	3	44
California	7	0	3	6	16

- Date: September 8
- Location: California Memorial Stadium, Berkeley, CA
- Game start: 2:30 p.m. PDT
- Elapsed time: 3:23
- Game attendance: 33,043
- Game weather: 72 °F (22 °C), clear at kickoff, winds W 10 mph (16 km/h)
- Referee: Chuck McFerrin
- TV announcers (SportsWest): Tom Kirkland, Blaine Fowler

Scoring summary
1	8:14	CAL	Marcus Fields 25-yard pass from Kyle Boller (Mark Jensen kick)	CAL 7-0
2	9:16	BYU	Luke Staley 27-yard pass from Brandon Doman (Matt Payne kick)	TIED 7-7
2	0:52	BYU	Brandon Doman 4-yard run (Matt Payne kick)	BYU 14-7
2	0:00	BYU	Brian McDonald 53-yard pass from Brandon Doman (Matt Payne kick)	BYU 21-7
3	11:26	BYU	Brandon Doman 4-yard run (Matt Payne kick)	BYU 28-7
3	8:53	BYU	Brandon Doman 4-yard run (Payne kick failed)	BYU 34-7
3	3:47	CAL	Mark Jensen 30-yard field goal	BYU 34-10
3	10:29	BYU	Reno Mahe 16-yard pass from Brandon Doman (Matt Payne kick)	BYU 41-10
4	5:03	BYU	Matt Payne 23-yard field goal	BYU 44-10
4	2:19	CAL	Ryan Stanger 19-yard pass from Eric Holtfreter (Holtfreter run failed)	BYU 44-16

=== UNLV ===
Team	1	2	3	4	Total
• #20/20 BYU	10	18	0	7	35
UNLV	21	0	7	3	31

- Date: September 29
- Location: Sam Boyd Stadium, Las Vegas, NV
- Game start: 4:07 p.m. PDT
- Elapsed time: 3:12
- Game attendance: 32,601
- Game weather: 100 °F (38 °C), Partly cloudy, Winds S 1 mph (1.6 km/h)
- Referee: Gerald Wright
- TV announcers (ABC): Rich Cellini, Reggie Rivers

Scoring summary
1	14:47	UNLV	Derek Olsen 22-yard fumble return (Dillon Pieffer kick)	UNLV 7-0
1	12:19	UNLV	Luke Staley 14-yard pass from Brandon Doman (Matt Payne kick)	TIED 7-7
1	8:57	BYU	Matt Payne 50-yard field goal	BYU 10-7
1	4:56	UNLV	Joe Haro 3-yard run (Dillon Pieffer kick)	UNLV 14-10
1	2:50	UNLV	Dominique Dorsey 8-yard run (Dillon Pieffer kick)	UNLV 21-10
2	13:19	BYU	Justin Andersen 1-yard run (Matt Payne kick)	UNLV 21-17
2	12:12	BYU	Matt Payne 42-yard field goal	UNLV 21-20
2	0:54	BYU	Rod Wilkerson 54-yard pass from Brandon Doman (Brandon Doman run)	BYU 28-21
3	9:22	UNLV	Dominique Dorsey 12-yard run (Dillon Pieffer kick)	TIED 28-28
4	6:32	UNLV	Dillon Pieffer 22-yard field goal	UNLV 31-28
4	1:12	BYU	Brandon Doman 21-yard run (Matt Payne kick)	BYU 35-31

=== Utah State ===
Team	1	2	3	4	Total
Utah State	6	21	7	0	34
• #20/18 BYU	14	7	20	13	54

- Date: October 5
- Location: LaVell Edwards Stadium, Provo, UT
- Game start: 7:05 p.m. MDT
- Elapsed time: 3:39
- Game attendance: 65,396
- Game weather: 68 °F (20 °C), clear, winds N 2–5 mph (3.2–8.0 km/h)
- Referee: Rich Kollen
- TV announcers (SportsWest): Tom Kirkland, Blaine Fowler

Scoring summary
1	7:29	BYU	Luke Staley 1-yard run (Matt Payne kick)	BYU 7-0
1	3:02	USU	Kevin Curtis 13-yard pass from Jose Fuentes (Dane Kidman kick failed)	BYU 7-6
1	2:35	BYU	Doug Jolley 19-yard pass from Brandon Doman (Matt Payne kick)	BYU 14-6
2	14:55	USU	Jeff Crosbie 12-yard run (Jose Fuentes pass failed)	BYU 14-12
2	12:10	BYU	Luke Staley 28-yard pass from Brandon Doman (Matt Payne kick)	BYU 21-12
2	10:16	USU	Emmett White 26-yard run (Dane Kidman kick)	BYU 21-19
2	5:19	USU	Emmett White 18-yard run (Emmett White pass)	USU 27-21
3	12:41	USU	Chris Stallworth 14-yard pass from Jose Fuentes (Dane Kidman kick)	USU 34-21
3	8:58	BYU	Luke Staley 37-yard run (Matt Payne kick failed)	USU 34-27
3	6:30	BYU	Luke Staley 1-yard run (Aaron Edmonds kicked)	TIED 34-34
3	1:33	BYU	Luke Staley 5-yard run (Aaron Edmonds kick)	BYU 41-34
4	13:13	BYU	Mike Rigell 6-yard pass from Brandon Doman (Aaron Edmonds kick)	BYU 48-34
4	6:02	BYU	Spencer Nead 5-yard pass from Brandon Doman (Aaron Edmonds kick blocked)	BYU 54-34

=== New Mexico ===
Team	1	2	3	4	Total
• #18/17 BYU	3	7	0	14	24
New Mexico	0	10	3	7	20

- Date: October 13
- Location: University Stadium, Albuquerque, NM
- Game start: 1:07 p.m. MDT
- Elapsed time: 3:20
- Game attendance: 29,036
- Game weather: 59 °F (15 °C), clear, winds SW 12 mph (19 km/h)
- Referee: Jack Wood
- TV announcers (ESPN+): Jim Kelly, JC Pearson, Beth Mowins

Scoring summary
1	11:18	BYU	Matt Payne 33-yard field goal	BYU 3-0
2	8:38	UNM	Jarrod Baxter 1-yard run (Vladimir Borombozin kick)	UNM 7-3
2	4:54	BYU	Rod Wilkerson 28-yard pass from Brandon Doman (Matt Payne kick)	BYU 10-7
2	0:23	UNM	Vladimir Borombozin 20-yard field goal	TIED 10-10
3	3:07	UNM	Vladimir Borombozin 23-yard field goal	UNM 13-10
4	11:01	BYU	Mike Rigell 27-yard pass from Brandon Doman (Matt Payne kick)	BYU 17-13
4	6:09	UNM	Javier Hanson 19-yard pass from Derri Shepherd (Vladimir Borombozin kick)	UNM 20-17
4	3:33	BYU	Andrew Ord 15-yard pass from Brandon Doman (Matt Payne kick)	BYU 24-20

=== Air Force ===
Team	1	2	3	4	Total
Air Force	7	6	0	20	33
• #18/13 BYU	21	21	21	0	63

- Date: October 20
- Location: LaVell Edwards Stadium, Provo, UT
- Game start: 3:50 p.m. MDT
- Elapsed time: 3:21
- Game attendance: 62,382
- Game weather: 72 °F (22 °C), clear and sunny, wind N 2–5 mph (3.2–8.0 km/h)
- Referee: Ken Rivera
- TV announcers (ESPN2): Pam Ward, Dean Blevins, Heather Cox

Scoring summary
1	11:12	BYU	Doug Jolley 18-yard pass from Brandon Doman (Matt Payne kick)	BYU 7-0
1	8:52	BYU	Luke Staley 2-yard run (Matt Payne kick)	BYU 14-0
1	6:45	AFA	Keith Boyea 36-yard run (Brooks Walters kick)	BYU 14-7
1	4:42	BYU	Brandon Doman 7-yard run (Matt Payne kick)	BYU 21-7
2	8:45	BYU	Reno Mahe 14-yard pass from Brandon Doman (Matt Payne kick)	BYU 28-7
2	5:29	BYU	Luke Staley 5-yard run (Matt Payne kick)	BYU 35-7
2	2:05	AFA	Ryan Flemming 12-yard pass from Keith Boyea (Brooks Walters kick failed)	BYU 35-13
2	0:56	BYU	Doug Jolley 18-yard pass from Brandon Doman (Matt Payne kick)	BYU 42-13
3	10:11	BYU	Doug Jolley 18-yard pass from Brandon Doman (Matt Payne kick)	BYU 49-13
3	4:56	BYU	Mike Rigell 7-yard pass from Charlie Peterson (Matt Payne kick)	BYU 56-13
3	2:09	BYU	Paul Peterson 2-yard run (Matt Payne kick)	BYU 63-13
4	13:45	AFA	Chance Harridge 3-yard run (Brooks Walters kick)	BYU 63-20
4	2:04	AFA	Brandon Brown 5-yard run (Brooks Walters kick failed)	BYU 63-26
4	0:41	AFA	Anthony Butler 46-yard run (Brooks Walters kick)	BYU 63-33

=== San Diego State ===
Team	1	2	3	4	Total
• #16/10 BYU	7	17	14	21	59
San Diego State	7	7	7	0	21

- Date: October 27
- Location: Qualcomm Stadium, San Diego, CA
- Game start: 6:07 p.m. PDT
- Elapsed time: 3:11
- Game attendance: 30,064
- Game weather: 67 °F (19 °C), partly cloudy and cool, winds W 5 mph (8.0 km/h)
- Referee: Clair Gausman
- TV announcers (SportsWest): Tom Kirkland, Blaine Fowler

Scoring summary
1	9:49	SDSU	Ryan Denney 82-yard missed field goal return (Matt Payne kick)	BYU 7-0
1	0:06	SDSU	Larry Ned 1-yard run (Tommy Kirovski kick)	TIED 7-7
2	14:49	SDSU	Larry Ned 23-yard run (Tommy Kirovski kick)	SDSU 14-7
2	9:27	BYU	Matt Payne 34-yard field goal	SDSU 14-10
2	5:21	BYU	Luke Staley 63-yard run (Matt Payne kick)	BYU 17-14
2	1:46	BYU	Isaac Kelley 60-yard interception return (Matt Payne kick)	BYU 24-14
3	10:22	BYU	Soren Halladay 32-yard pass from Brandon Doman (Matt Payne kick)	BYU 31-14
3	8:18	SDSU	McNeill 26-yard pass from Lon Sheriff (Tommy Kirovski kick)	BYU 31-21
3	3:18	SDSU	Luke Staley 3-yard run (Matt Payne kick)	BYU 38-21
4	13:36	BYU	Gabriel Reid 4-yard pass from Brandon Doman (Matt Payne kick)	BYU 45-21
4	7:38	BYU	Luke Staley 8-yard run (Matt Payne kick)	BYU 52-21
4	4:38	BYU	Tody Christensen 68-yard pass from Charlie Peterson (Matt Payne kick)	BYU 59-21

=== Colorado State ===
Team	1	2	3	4	Total
Colorado State	0	24	10	0	34
• #13/8 BYU	21	7	14	14	56

- Date: November 1
- Location: LaVell Edwards Stadium, Provo, UT
- Game start: 7:51 p.m. MST
- Elapsed time: 3:42
- Game attendance: 63,478
- Game weather: 51 °F (11 °C), clear, windy
- Referee: Gerald Wright
- TV announcers (ESPN2): Rich Waltz, Dean Blevins, Heather Cox

Scoring summary
1	11:30	BYU	Brandon Doman 7-yard run (Matt Payne kick)	BYU 7-0
1	5:20	BYU	Luke Staley 2-yard run (Matt Payne kick)	BYU 14-0
1	0:48	BYU	Luke Staley 2-yard run (Matt Payne kick)	BYU 21-0
2	11:13	CSU	Joel Dressen 1-yard pass from Bradlee Van Pelt (Kent Naughton kick)	BYU 21-7
2	5:24	CSU	Bradlee Van Pelt 18-yard run (Kent Naughton kick)	BYU 21-14
2	4:00	CSU	Bryan Save 28-yard fumble return (Kent Naughton kicked)	TIED 21-21
2	1:54	BYU	Luke Staley 44-yard run (Matt Payne kick)	BYU 28-21
2	0:00	CSU	Kent Naughton 31-yard field goal	BYU 28-24
3	11:59	CSU	Bradlee Van Pelt 5-yard run (Kent Naughton kick)	CSU 31-28
3	10:23	BYU	Brandon Doman 37-yard run (Matt Payne kick)	BYU 35-31
3	7:19	BYU	Luke Staley 20-yard run (Matt Payne kick)	BYU 42-31
3	1:02	CSU	Kent Naughton 25-yard field goal	BYU 42-34
4	13:23	BYU	Gabriel Reid 29-yard pass from Brandon Doman (Matt Payne kick)	BYU 49-34
4	2:21	BYU	Luke Staley 3-yard run (Matt Payne kick)	BYU 56-34

=== Wyoming ===
Team	1	2	3	4	Total
• #9/9 BYU	10	10	14	7	41
Wyoming	7	13	7	7	34

- Date: November 10
- Location: War Memorial Stadium, Laramie, WY
- Game start: 1:07 p.m. MST
- Elapsed time: 3:43
- Game attendance: 15,277
- Game weather: 54 °F (12 °C), Clear and sunny, Winds W 5 mph (8.0 km/h)
- Referee: Ken Flaherty
- TV announcers (ESPN+): Jim Kelly, JC Pearson, Beth Mowins

Scoring summary
1	12:14	BYU	Matt Payne 40-yard field goal	BYU 3-0
1	8:02	BYU	Luke Staley 3-yard run (Matt Payne kick)	BYU 10-0
1	1:01	WY	Casey Bramlet 9-yard run (Jarvis Wallum kick)	BYU 10-7
2	13:27	WY	Jarvis Wallum 37-yard field goal	TIED 10-10
2	11:21	BYU	Reno Mahe 16-yard pass from Brandon Doman (Matt Payne kick)	BYU 17-10
2	6:15	BYU	Matt Payne 27-yard field goal	BYU 20-10
2	2:31	WY	Jarvis Wallum 37-yard field goal	BYU 20-13
2	0:41	WY	Scottie Vines 37-yard pass from Casey Bramlet (Jarvis Wallum kick)	TIED 20-20
3	10:26	BYU	Luke Staley 1-yard run (Matt Payne kick)	BYU 27-20
3	7:10	WY	Kit Bradshaw 2-yard run (Jarvis Wallum kick)	TIED 27-27
3	1:30	BYU	Luke Staley 4-yard run (Matt Payne kick)	BYU 34-27
4	9:28	WY	Casey Bramlet 1-yard run (Jarvis Wallum kick)	TIED 34-34
4	2:08	BYU	Luke Staley 8-yard run (Matt Payne kick)	BYU 41-34

=== Utah ===
Team	1	2	3	4	Total
UTAH	0	7	7	7	21
• #8/8 BYU	0	3	7	14	24

- Date: November 17
- Location: LaVell Edwards Stadium, Provo, UT
- Game start: 5:06 p.m. MST
- Elapsed time: 3:27
- Game attendance: 66,149
- Game weather: 60 °F (16 °C), Fair, winds S 1–3 mph (1.6–4.8 km/h)
- Referee: Gerald Wright
- TV announcers (ESPN2): Dave Barnett, Bill Curry, Mike Golic, Michele Tafoya

Scoring summary
2	11:58	UTAH	Dennis Smith 13-yard pass from Lance Rice (Ryan Kaneshiro kick)	UTAH 7-0
2	4:14	BYU	Matt Payne 35-yard field goal	UTAH 7-3
3	2:21	UTAH	Dameon Hunter 15-yard run (Ryan Kaneshiro kick)	UTAH 14-3
3	0:19	BYU	Reno Mahe 23-yard pass from Brandon Doman (Matt Payne kick)	UTAH 14-10
4	9:53	UTAH	Adam Tate 1-yard run (Ryan Kaneshiro kick)	UTAH 21-10
4	3:22	BYU	Luke Staley 7-yard pass from Brandon Doman (Luke Staley run)	UTAH 21-18
4	1:16	BYU	Luke Staley 30-yard run (Matt Payne kick failed)	BYU 24-21

=== Mississippi State ===
Team	1	2	3	4	Total
• #10/7 BYU	7	14	3	17	41
Mississippi State	14	10	7	7	38

- Date: December 1
- Location: Davis Wade Stadium, Starkville, MS
- Game start: 7:06 p.m. CST
- Elapsed time: 3:37
- Game attendance: 43,156
- Referee: Jack Wood
- TV announcers (ESPN2): Pam Ward, Dean Blevins, Heather Cox

Scoring summary
1	11:52	BYU	Reno Mahe 7-yard pass from Brandon Doman (Matt Payne kick)	BYU 7-0
1	9:22	MSU	Dicenzo Miller 27-yard run (John Michael Marlin kick)	TIED 7-7
1	4:17	MSU	Ray Bivines 30-yard pass from Kevin Fant (John Michael Marlin kick)	MSU 14-7
2	12:45	MSU	Justin Jenkins 7-yard pass from Kevin Fant (John Michael Marlin kick)	MSU 21-7
2	3:49	BYU	Reno Mahe 62-yard pass from Brandon Doman (Matt Payne kick)	MSU 21-14
2	2:08	BYU	Soren Halladay 45-yard pass from Brandon Doman (Matt Payne kick)	TIED 21-21
2	1:10	MSU	John Michael Marlin 23-yard field goal	MSU 24-21
3	9:33	MSU	Justin Jenkins 27-yard pass from Kevin Fant (John Michael Marlin kick)	MSU 31-21
3	1:53	BYU	Matt Payne 42-yard field goal	MSU 31-24
4	14:22	BYU	Doug Jolley 26-yard pass from Brandon Doman (Matt Payne kick)	TIED 31-31
4	9:27	MSU	Dicenzo Miller 22-yard run (John Michael Marlin kick)	MSU 38-31
4	2:08	BYU	Spencer Nead 12-yard pass from Brandon Doman (Matt Payne kick)	TIED 38-38
4	1:16	BYU	Matt Payne 25-yard field goal	BYU 41-38

=== Hawaii ===
Team	1	2	3	4	Total
#9/8 BYU	10	0	21	14	45
• Hawaii	21	10	27	14	72

- Date: December 8
- Location: Aloha Stadium, Halawa, Hawaii
- Game start: 11:06 a.m.
- Elapsed time: 3:37
- Game attendance: 50,000
- Game weather: 79 °F (26 °C), Breezy and Partly cloudy
- Referee: Frank White
- TV announcers (ESPN2): Pam Ward, Dean Blevins, Heather Cox

Scoring summary
1	14:37	UH	Channon Harris 23-yard pass from Nick Rolovich (Justin Ayat kick)	UH 7-0
1	12:42	UH	Chad Owens 74-yard punt return (Justin Ayat kick)	UH 14-0
1	4:26	BYU	Matt Payne 44-yard field goal	UH 14-3
1	0:43	BYU	Spencer Nead 24-yard pass from Brandon Doman (Matt Payne kick)	UH 14-10
1	0:26	UH	Chad Owens 100-yard kickoff return (Justin Ayat kick)	UH 21-10
2	7:15	UH	Justin Ayat 45-yard field goal	UH 24-10
2	4:33	UH	Ashley Lelie 15-yard pass from Nick Rolovich (Justin Ayat kick)	UH 31-10
3	10:31	UH	Tafiti Uso 19-yard pass from Nick Rolovich (Justin Ayat kick)	UH 38-10
3	10:05	BYU	Reno Mahe 55-yard pass from Brandon Doman (Matt Payne kick)	UH 38-17
3	8:53	UH	Tafiti Uso 21-yard pass from Nick Rolovich (Justin Ayat kick)	UH 45-17
3	7:10	BYU	Doug Jolley 21-yard pass from Charlie Peterson (Matt Payne kick)	UH 45-24
3	3:57	UH	Craig Stutzmann 5-yard pass from Nick Rolovich (Justin Ayat kick)	UH 52-24
3	1:05	BYU	Doug Jolley 1-yard pass from Charlie Peterson (Matt Payne kick)	UH 52-31
3	0:37	UH	Ashley Lelie 80-yard pass from Nick Rolovich (kick failed)	UH 58-31
4	14:54	UH	Channon Harris 18-yard pass from Nick Rolovich (Justin Ayat kick)	UH 65-31
4	10:37	BYU	Reno Mahe 5-yard pass from Todd Mortensen (Matt Payne kick)	UH 65-38
4	7:46	UH	Channon Harris 12-yard pass from Nick Rolovich (Justin Ayat kick)	UH 72-38
4	3:45	BYU	Ned Stearns 1-yard run (Matt Payne kick)	UH 72-45

=== Louisville ===
2001 Liberty Bowl

Team	1	2	3	4	Total
#19/17 BYU	0	7	3	0	10
• #23/22 Louisville	7	7	7	7	28

- Date: December 31
- Location: Liberty Bowl Memorial Stadium, Memphis, TN
- Game start: 3:17 p.m. CST
- Elapsed time: 3:14
- Game attendance: 58,968
- Game weather: 33 °F (1 °C), Sunny
- Referee: Jeff Roberson
- TV announcers (ESPN): Mark Jones, Chris Spielman, Holly Rowe

Scoring summary
1	12:52	LOU	Henry Miller 1-yard run (Nathan Smith kick)	LOU 7-0
2	7:56	BYU	Dustin Rykert 10-yard run (Matt Payne kick)	TIED 7-7
2	0:14	LOU	Chip Mattingly 1-yard pass from Dave Ragone (Nathan Smith kick)	LOU 14-7
3	7:58	BYU	Matt Payne 29-yard field goal	LOU 14-10
3	4:15	LOU	Damien Dorsey 34-yard pass from Dave Ragone (Nathan Smith kick)	LOU 21-10
4	14:11	LOU	Ronnie Ghent 27-yard pass from Dave Ragone (Nathan Smith kick)	LOU 28-10

== Roster ==
2001 BYU Cougars football team roster
Players
Coaches
Offense

Pos.	#	Name	Class
WR	2	David Christensen	So
WR	80	Tody Christensen	So
QB	11	Brandon Doman	Sr
TE	88	Doug Jolley	Sr
WR	20	Reno Mahe	Jr
TE	89	Spencer Nead	Jr
RB	6	Luke Staley	Jr

Defense

Pos.	#	Name	Class
LB	46	Colby Bockwoldt	So
DE	92	John Denney	Fr
DE	92	Ryan Denney	Sr
SS	33	Aaron Francisco	Fr
DE	93	Brett Keisel	Sr
LB	49	Brady Poppinga	Fr

Special teams

Pos.	#	Name	Class

Head coach

- Gary Crowton

Coordinators/assistant coaches

Legend

- (C) Team captain
- (S) Suspended
- (I) Ineligible
- Injured
- Redshirt

Roster
