= 2001 Mountain West Conference football season =

- League: NCAA Division I Football Bowl Subdivision
- Sport: Football
- Teams: 8

2002 NFL draft
- Top draft pick: Chester Pitts, guard, San Diego State
- Picked by: Houston Texans, 50th overall

Regular season
- Champion: BYU
- Runners-up: Colorado State
- Top scorer: Luke Staley (168 points)

Football seasons
- 2000 2002

2001 Mountain West Conference football standings
	Conf.			Overall
Team	W		L	W		L
No. 25 BYU $	7	–	0	12	–	2
Colorado State	5	–	2	7	–	5
Utah	4	–	3	8	–	4
New Mexico	4	–	3	6	–	5
Air Force	3	–	4	6	–	6
UNLV	3	–	4	4	–	7
San Diego State	2	–	5	3	–	8
Wyoming	0	–	7	2	–	9
$ – Conference champion; Rankings from AP Poll

The 2001 Mountain West Conference football season was the third since eight former members of the Western Athletic Conference banded together to form the Mountain West Conference. BYU won the conference championship in 2001, the Cougars' second title since the league began in 1999.

== Coaching changes ==
- Tom Craft took over at San Diego State, replacing Ted Tollner.
- Gary Crowton took over at BYU, replacing BYU legend LaVell Edwards.

== Bowl games ==
Bowl	Date	Stadium	City	Result
New Orleans Bowl	December 18, 2001	Louisiana Superdome	New Orleans, Louisiana	Colorado State 45, North Texas 20
Las Vegas Bowl	December 25, 2001	Sam Boyd Stadium	Las Vegas, Nevada	Utah 10, Southern Cal 6
Liberty Bowl	December 31, 2001	Liberty Bowl Memorial Stadium	Memphis, Tennessee	Louisville 28, BYU 10

== Awards ==
- Coach of the Year: Gary Crowton, BYU
- Offensive Player of the Year: RB Luke Staley, Jr, BYU
- Defensive Player of the Year: DB Kevin Thomas, Sr, UNLV
- Freshman of the Year: RB Dominique Dorsey, UNLV

== All-Conference teams ==
First-team:

Offense
Quarterback	Brandon Doman, Sr, BYU
Running back	Luke Staley, Jr, BYU; Larry Ned, Sr, San Diego State
Wide receiver	Reno Mahe, Jr, BYU; Ryan McGuffey, So, Wyoming
Tight end	Doug Jolley, Sr, BYU
Offensive Line	Doug Kaufusi, Sr, Utah; David Moreno, Sr, San Diego State; Adam Goldberg, Jr, Wyoming; David Shohet, Sr, Colorado State; Jason Scukanec, Sr, BYU
Kicker	V. Borombozin, Sr, New Mexico
Kick returner	Pete Rebstock, Sr, Colorado State

Defense
Defensive line	Ryan Denney, Sr, BYU; Jason Kaufusi, Jr, Utah; Brian Johnson, Sr, New Mexico; Garrett Smith, Sr, Utah
Linebacker	Gary Davis, Sr, New Mexico; Justin Ena, Sr, BYU; Sheldon Deckart, Jr, Utah
Defensive back	Kevin Thomas, Sr, UNLV; Will Demps, Sr, San Diego State; Sam Brandon, Sr, UNLV; Jernaro Gilford, So, BYU
Punter	Joey Huber, Jr, Colorado State

Second-team:

Offense
Quarterback	Casey Bramlet, So, Wyoming
Running back	Dameon Hunter, Sr, Utah; Joe Haro, Jr, UNLV
Wide receiver	J. R. Tolver, Jr, San Diego State; Cliff Russell, Sr, Utah
Tight end	Jose Ochoa, Sr, Colorado State
Offensive Line	Ben Miller, Sr, Air Force; Peter Tramontanas, Sr, UNLV; Jeremy Sorenson, Sr, New Mexico; Ben Archibald, Jr, BYU; Broc Finlayson, Sr, Colorado State
Kicker	Jarvis Wallum, So, Wyoming
Kick returner	Dexter Wynn, So, Colorado State

Defense
Defensive line	Jerome Haywood, Sr, San Diego State; Lauvale Sape, Sr, Utah; Anton Palepoi, Sr, UNLV; Zach Johnson, Sr, Air Force
Linebacker	Eric Pauley, So, Colorado State; Leo Caires, Sr, Wyoming; Drew Wood, So, Colorado State
Defensive back	Jason Gallimore, Sr, Colorado State; Antwoine Sanders, So, Utah; Stephen Persley, Sr, New Mexico; Justin Gallimore, Sr, Colorado State
Punter	Brian Simnjanovski, Jr, San Diego State
