= 2001 Utah Utes football team =

American college football season

2001 Utah Utes football

Las Vegas Bowl champion

Las Vegas Bowl, W 10–6 vs. USC
- Conference: Mountain West Conference
- Record: 8–4 (4–3 MW)
- Head coach: Ron McBride (12th season)
- Offensive coordinator: Craig Ver Steeg (1st season)
- Offensive scheme: Pro-style
- Defensive coordinator: Kyle Whittingham (7th season)
- Base defense: 4–3
- Home stadium: Rice–Eccles Stadium

2001 Mountain West Conference football standings
	Conf.			Overall
Team	W		L	W		L
No. 25 BYU $	7	–	0	12	–	2
Colorado State	5	–	2	7	–	5
Utah	4	–	3	8	–	4
New Mexico	4	–	3	6	–	5
Air Force	3	–	4	6	–	6
UNLV	3	–	4	4	–	7
San Diego State	2	–	5	3	–	8
Wyoming	0	–	7	2	–	9
$ – Conference champion; Rankings from AP Poll

The 2001 Utah Utes football team represented the University of Utah as a member of the Mountain West Conference (MW) during the 2001 NCAA Division I-A football season. Led by 12th-year head coach Ron McBride, the Utes compiled an overall record of 8–4 with a mark of 4–3 in conference play, tying for third place in the MW. Utah was invited to the Las Vegas Bowl, where the Utes defeated USC. The team played home games at Rice–Eccles Stadium in Salt Lake City.

== Schedule ==
Date	Time	Opponent	Site	TV	Result	Attendance	Source
September 1	6:00 pm	Utah State*	Rice–Eccles Stadium; Salt Lake City, UT (Battle of the Brothers)	KJZZ	W 23–19	36,557	
September 8	1:30 pm	at No. 7 Oregon*	Autzen Stadium; Eugene, OR	KJZZ	L 10–24	45,712	
September 22	3:00 pm	at Indiana*	Memorial Stadium; Bloomington, IN	KJZZ	W 28–26	26,591	
September 29	1:00 pm	New Mexico^{†}	Rice–Eccles Stadium; Salt Lake City, UT	ESPN Plus	W 37–16	32,100	
October 6	6:00 pm	South Florida*	Rice–Eccles Stadium; Salt Lake City, UT	KJZZ	W 52–21	30,818	
October 20	1:00 pm	Wyoming	Rice–Eccles Stadium; Salt Lake City, UT	ESPN Plus	W 35–0	36,795	
October 27	1:00 pm	at Colorado State	Hughes Stadium; Fort Collins, CO	ESPN Plus	L 17–19	24,119	
November 3	1:00 pm	at UNLV	Sam Boyd Stadium; Whitney, NV	ESPN Plus	W 42–14	21,042	
November 10	1:00 pm	San Diego State	Rice–Eccles Stadium; Salt Lake City, UT		W 17–3	36,018	
November 17	5:00 pm	at No. 9 BYU	LaVell Edwards Stadium; Provo, UT (Holy War)	ESPN2	L 21–24	66,149	
December 1	12:00 pm	at Air Force	Falcon Stadium; Colorado Springs, CO	KJZZ	L 37–38	25,702	
December 25	1:30 pm	vs. USC*	Sam Boyd Stadium; Whitney, NV (Las Vegas Bowl)	ABC	W 10–6	30,894	
*Non-conference game; ^{†}Homecoming; Rankings from AP Poll released prior to the game; All times are in Mountain time

== Roster ==
2001 Utah Utes football team roster
Players
Coaches
Offense

Pos.	#	Name	Class
OT	69	Jordan Gross	Jr
WR	1	Cliff Russell	Sr

Defense

Pos.	#	Name	Class
DB	4	Antwoine Sanders	So
DL	97	Lauvale Sape	Jr
DE	63	Garrett Smith	Jr

Special teams

Pos.	#	Name	Class

Head coach

- Ron McBride

Coordinators/assistant coaches

Legend

- (C) Team captain
- (S) Suspended
- (I) Ineligible
- Injured
- Redshirt

== NFL draft ==
Two players went in the 2002 NFL draft, and one player was signed as an undrafted free agent.

Player	Position	Round	Pick	NFL club
Cliff Russell	Wide receiver	3	87	Washington Redskins
Ed Ta'amu	Guard	4	132	Minnesota Vikings
Maake Kemoeatu	Defensive tackle	-	-	Baltimore Ravens
