= Reno Mahe =

American football player and coach (born 1980)

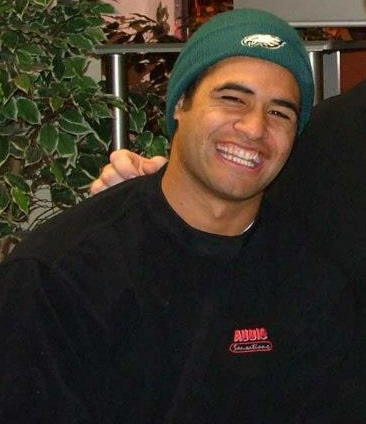
- Mahe in 2015

No. 34, 25
- Positions: Running back, return specialist

Personal information
- Born: June 3, 1980 (age 46); Los Angeles, California, U.S.
- Listed height: 5 ft 10 in (1.78 m)
- Listed weight: 212 lb (96 kg)

Career information
- High school: Brighton (Cottonwood Heights, Utah)
- College: BYU
- NFL draft: 2003: undrafted

Career history

Playing
- Philadelphia Eagles (2003–2007)

Coaching
- BYU (2016–2017) Running backs coach

Awards and highlights
- First-team All-MW (2001); Second-team All-MW (2002); Polynesian Football Hall of Fame (2024)

Career NFL statistics
- Rushing yards: 196
- Rushing average: 4.2
- Receptions: 33
- Receiving yards: 230
- Return yards: 1,600
- Stats at Pro Football Reference

Sateki Reno Mahe Jr. (born June 3, 1980) is an American former professional football player who was a running back for five seasons for the Philadelphia Eagles of the National Football League (NFL). Mahe played college football for the BYU Cougars, and was signed by the Eagles as an undrafted free agent in 2003.

== Early life ==
Mahe was born June 3, 1980, in Los Angeles to Sateki Reno Mahe Sr. and his wife, Eva, who are both from the island nation of Tonga. One of eight children, Mahe moved with his family numerous times before settling in at Brighton High School in Salt Lake City, Utah.

Mahe played football at Brighton, where he was named All-State twice. As a senior, he led his team to a 10–1 record and was chosen as the Gatorade Utah Player of the Year. He also earned team MVP, All-Region, and region MVP honors in his final high school season. He lettered in football three times, and in basketball two times.

A member of the Church of Jesus Christ of Latter-day Saints, Mahe put service as a missionary on hold after high school in order to concentrate on football. In 2009, he told an interviewer, "I really got caught up in the football world, and decided to play football. To this day, I still regret not going on my mission." The University of Utah offered him a chance to play defense; Brigham Young University offered him a chance to play offense. Although he was a fan of the Utes (because his elder brother had gone to Utah), he chose BYU for the opportunity to play offense. During his freshman season at BYU, fans knew him as Junior Mahe.

== College career ==
Mahe's college football career at BYU started in 1998. As a true freshman that year, he had a significant role on the team. He served as backup to star running back Ronney Jenkins. Mahe rushed for 481 yards and scored 7 touchdowns during the season. He scored a touchdown in his first-ever college football game, a 38–31 BYU loss against Alabama in Tuscaloosa.

After a promising freshman season, Mahe was suspended from BYU for one year because of Honor Code violations. The BYU honor code stipulates that students must "be honest, live a chaste and virtuous life…use clean language" and abstain from alcohol, tobacco, tea, coffee and drugs. Mahe transferred to Dixie State College in St. George, Utah. In his only season at Dixie he switched from running back to wide receiver and led the nation in receiving with 57 receptions for 1,387 yards (an average of 24.3 yards per reception) and 19 touchdowns. He was named a Junior College Gridwire Second-team All-American. He led the Western States Football League (WSFL) in receiving and scoring (122 total points) and was named to the All-WSFL First-team.

Mahe returned to BYU for his junior season in 2001. Under first-year coach Gary Crowton, BYU had the highest scoring offense in the nation that year, and Mahe was a big part of the team's success. He started all 14 games at wide receiver, and led the Mountain West Conference (MWC) in receiving with 91 receptions for 1,211 yards and 9 touchdowns. He was named to the All-MWC First-team. Mahe became a favorite of BYU fans for his heroic efforts in a game against rival Utah. The Monday before the game he had an emergency appendectomy procedure where his appendix was removed with a laser. He still managed to play in the following game with blood running down his shirt. The appendectomy did not affect his playing ability: he caught 5 passes for 94 yards and a touchdown in BYU's 24–21 victory. Later in the season, when BYU's star running back, Luke Staley, suffered a season-ending injury against Mississippi State, Mahe stepped up with a season-high 189 receiving yards (and 2 touchdowns) and the Cougars escaped with a 41–38 victory. In the following game against, the University of Hawaii, Mahe set another season high with 14 receptions for 181 yards and 2 touchdowns. He also filled in at running back, carrying the ball 8 times for 69 yards in Staley's absence. Despite Mahe's efforts, the Cougars lost, 72–45. The defeat shattered BYU's perfect season (they had a 12–0 record before the game against Hawaii).

Mahe's senior season at BYU wasn't as successful. The Cougars finished the season with a losing record, and Mahe's statistics declined. He totaled 59 receptions for 771 yards and 2 touchdowns. He was still good enough to earn All-MWC First-team honors again, and he finished his college career as one of the best receivers in BYU history.

== Professional career ==
Pre-draft measurables
Height	Weight	Arm length	Hand span	40-yard dash	10-yard split	20-yard split	20-yard shuttle	Three-cone drill	Vertical jump	Broad jump	Wonderlic
5 ft 9 1/4 in (1.76 m)	198 lb (90 kg)	29 3/4 in (0.76 m)	9 5/8 in (0.24 m)	4.71 s	1.60 s	2.74 s	4.23 s	7.27 s	32 in (0.81 m)	9 ft 1 in (2.77 m)	24
All values from NFL Scouting Combine

Although he was not drafted into the NFL, Mahe joined the Philadelphia Eagles as a rookie free agent and made the team's 2003 opening day roster. He switched from wide receiver to his original position, running back.

In five seasons with the Eagles, he saw limited action on offense. He played in 38 games, rushing 43 times for 178 yards and catching 27 passes for 196 yards. His major contributions for the Eagles came on special teams. In 2005, he led the NFL in punt returning with 21 returns for 269 yards, an average of 12.8 yards per return. For his efforts, he was named to the NFL All-Pro team by Pro Football Writers of America. Mahe became a free agent following the 2006 season, but was re-signed to a one-year contract after the Eagles' lackluster special teams play led to a loss to the Green Bay Packers in week one of the 2007 season. He elected to retire after this season.

== Coaching career ==
Mahe was hired by Kalani Sitake as BYU's running backs coach in 2016 and coached for two seasons.

== Personal life ==
Mahe's married his college girlfriend, Sunny, who was an All-American volleyball player at BYU. They are the parents of 10 children, five daughters and five sons. One daughter was mortally injured in a household accident in November 2016 at age 3. Mahe is related to ex-Eagle Vai Sikahema. During his offseason workouts in Philadelphia during the summer, Mahe took on a part-time job at Chickie's and Pete's restaurant.
