= Robert G. Cole Junior-Senior High School =

Robert G. Cole Middle and High School

Location
- 1900 Winans Road; San Antonio, Texas 78234-1498; United States; 29.478331°N 98.416993°W

Information
- Type: Public middle & high school secondary school
- School district: Fort Sam Houston Independent School District
- Authority: Texas Education Agency
- Authorizer: United States Department of Education
- Principal: Dr. Joseph Cerna
- Teaching staff: 73.24 (on an FTE basis)
- Grades: 6-12
- Gender: Co-Educational
- Enrollment: 788 (2023-2024)
- Student to teacher ratio: 10.76
- Colors: Green and Gold
- Athletics conference: UIL Class AAA
- Mascot: Cougar
- Nickname: Cougars
- Website: Robert G. Cole High School

Robert G. Cole Middle and High School is the only public middle school and public high school for the Fort Sam Houston Independent School District, and is classified as a 3A school by the UIL. It is named after Medal of Honor recipient Lt. Col. Robert G. Cole, who was born on Fort Sam Houston. As the boundaries of the district are coterminous with the boundaries of Fort Sam Houston, enrollment at Cole is open only to those pupils residing on the installation or nearby Camp Bullis, or transfer students whose parents work at either installation.

Cole has been twice named a National Blue Ribbon School, in 1986-87 and again in 1990-91. For the 2024-2025 school year, the school was given an "A" by the Texas Education Agency, with distinctions for Academic Achievement in Science, Academic Achievement in Reading/ELA, Postsecondary Readiness, Comparative Academic Growth, and Comparative Closing the Gaps.

== Athletics ==
The Robert G. Cole Cougars compete in the following sports: Baseball, Basketball, Cross Country, Football, Golf, Powerlifting, Soccer, Softball, Swimming, Tennis, Track and Field, and Volleyball.

=== State titles ===
- Boys Basketball -
  - 1989(3A) 2021(3A)

== Notable alumni ==
- Alan Keyes (1968), American politician.
- Babette Maxwell, founder of Military Spouse magazine.
- Kivuusama Mays, former NFL linebacker.
- Shaquille O'Neal (1989), former NBA player.
