= Lackland =

Lackland may refer to:

- "Lackland", nickname given to King John of England
- "sans Terre" ("lack land"), nickname of John of Artois, Count of Eu
- Lackland Air Force Base, San Antonio, Texas

- Lackland AFB sex scandal

- Lackland Independent School District, a public school district in San Antonio
