= 2001 UNLV Rebels football team =

American college football season

2001 UNLV Rebels football
- Conference: Mountain West Conference
- Record: 4–7 (3–4 MW)
- Head coach: John Robinson (3rd season)
- Offensive coordinator: Rob Boras (1st season)
- Defensive coordinator: Mike Bradeson (2nd season)
- Home stadium: Sam Boyd Stadium

2001 Mountain West Conference football standings
	Conf.			Overall
Team	W		L	W		L
No. 25 BYU $	7	–	0	12	–	2
Colorado State	5	–	2	7	–	5
Utah	4	–	3	8	–	4
New Mexico	4	–	3	6	–	5
Air Force	3	–	4	6	–	6
UNLV	3	–	4	4	–	7
San Diego State	2	–	5	3	–	8
Wyoming	0	–	7	2	–	9
$ – Conference champion; Rankings from AP Poll

The 2001 UNLV Rebels football team represented the University of Nevada, Las Vegas (UNLV) as a member of the Mountain West Conference (MW) during the 2001 NCAA Division I-A football season. Led by third-year head coach John Robinson, the Rebels compiled an overall record of 4–7 with a mark of 3–4 in conference play, tying for fifth place in the MW. The team played home games at Sam Boyd Stadium in Whitney, Nevada.

== Schedule ==
Date	Time	Opponent	Site	TV	Result	Attendance
August 30	4:30 p.m.	at Arkansas*	War Memorial Stadium; Little Rock, AR	ESPN	L 10–14	52,213
September 7	5:00 p.m.	No. 16 Northwestern*	Sam Boyd Stadium; Whitney, NV	ESPN	L 28–37	26,721
September 22	7:00 p.m.	at Arizona*	Arizona Stadium; Tucson, AZ	ESPN Plus	L 21–38	47,031
September 29	4:00 p.m.	No. 20 BYU	Sam Boyd Stadium; Whitney, NV	ABC	L 31–35	32,601
October 6	1:00 p.m.	at Nevada*	Mackay Stadium; Reno, NV (Fremont Cannon)	SPW	W 27–12	24,238
October 13	4:00 p.m.	San Diego State^{†}	Sam Boyd Stadium; Whitney, NV	ABC	W 31–3	22,100
October 20	4:00 p.m.	Colorado State	Sam Boyd Stadium; Whitney, NV	SPW	L 24–26	20,049
October 27	3:00 p.m.	at Wyoming	War Memorial Stadium; Laramie, WY	SPW	W 47–26	11,299
November 3	12:00 p.m.	Utah	Sam Boyd Stadium; Whitney, NV	ESPN Plus	L 14–42	21,042
November 10	4:00 p.m.	at New Mexico	University Stadium; Albuquerque, NM	SPW	L 17–27	27,107
November 17	12:00 p.m.	at Air Force	Falcon Stadium; Colorado Springs, CO	ESPN Plus	W 34–10	31,074
*Non-conference game; ^{†}Homecoming; Rankings from AP Poll released prior to the game; All times are in Pacific time
