= Virginia Allred Stacey Junior/Senior High School =

Virginia Allred Stacey Junior-Senior High School

Location
- 2460 Kenly Avenue, Building 8265; San Antonio, Bexar County, Texas 78236; United States; 29.389174°N 98.615579°W

Information
- Type: Public high school
- School district: Lackland Independent School District
- Faculty: 38 (on an FTE basis)
- Grades: 6-12
- Enrollment: 379 (2022-23)
- Color
- Athletics conference: UIL AA
- Team name: Eagles
- Website: Official website

Virginia Allred Stacey Junior-Senior High School, also known as Stacey High School, is a public high school located on Lackland Air Force Base in the city of San Antonio, Texas (USA), and is classified as 2A by the UIL. This school is part of the Lackland Independent School District, which is geographically located within the boundaries of Lackland AFB, in southwestern San Antonio. For the 2024-2025 school year, the school was given a "B" by the Texas Education Agency, with distinction designations for Academic Achievement in Mathematics, Science, and Social Studies.

== Athletics ==
The Stacey Eagles compete in these sports -

- Basketball
- Cross Country
- Golf
- Tennis
- Track and Field
- Volleyball
