= Randolph High School (Texas) =

Location
- Building 1225 Perimeter Road; Randolph AFB, Bexar County, Texas 78150; United States; 29.527655°N 98.295561°W

Information
- School type: Public, high school
- Founded: 1962
- Locale: Rural: Fringe
- School district: Randolph Field ISD
- Superintendent: Brian Holt
- NCES School ID: 483645004088
- Principal: Rachel Trevino
- Teaching staff: 35.30 (on an FTE basis)
- Grades: 9–12
- Enrollment: 469 (2022–2023)
- Student to teacher ratio: 13.29
- Language: English
- Campus: Suburban
- Colors: Silver and Blue
- Athletics conference: UIL Class 3A
- Mascot: Ro-Hawk
- Feeder Middle School: Randolph Middle School
- Feeder Elementary School: Randolph Elementary School
- Website: Official Website
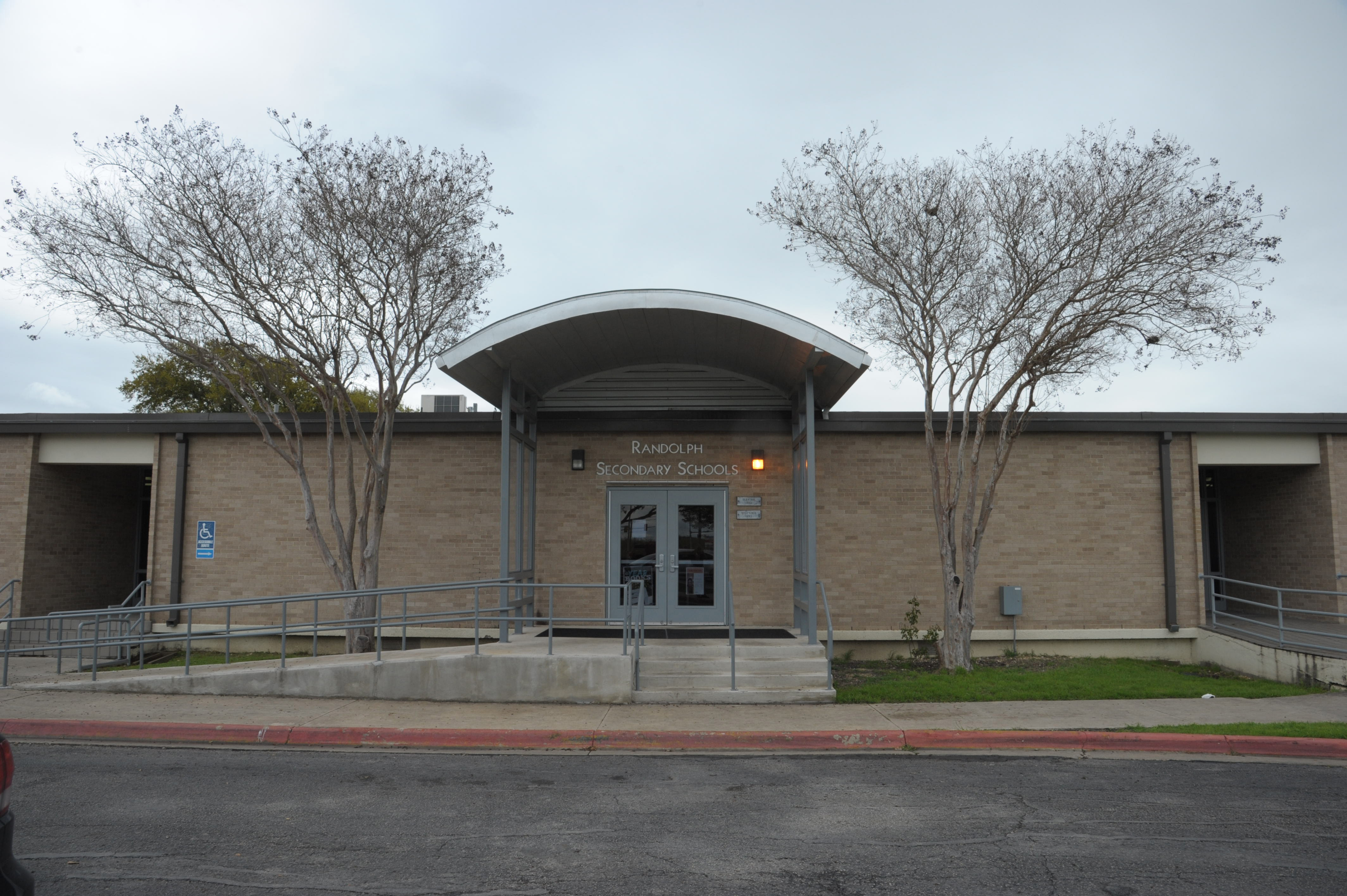

Randolph High School, part of the Randolph Field Independent School District, is located on Randolph Air Force Base in Universal City, Texas, a suburb of San Antonio. It serves approximately 470 high school students and employs approximately 40 high school teachers and other support staff. Randolph High School was established in 1962, and was the first high school located entirely within an existing Air Force Base.

== Overview ==
For the 2024-25 school year, the school was given an "A" by the Texas Education Agency. In 2017, Randolph High School was rated "Met Standard" by the Texas Education Agency, with a 1-Star Distinction for Academic Achievement in Social Studies. In 2005 Randolph was ranked the 15th-best high school in Texas by the Texas Education Excellence Project. The school has been a Texas Education Agency Exemplary School multiple times, most recently in 2009 and 2010.

== Technology ==
Beginning in 2003 students were issued 1:1 laptop computers for classroom and personal use during the school year, but had to return their computers before the end of the year. In 2011, the school purchased Promethean Boards for every classroom and in 2013 the school received a DODEA grant to provide all students and teachers with Apple iPad Air tablets.

== Construction ==
From 2007 to 2008, the school underwent construction to renovate the gymnasium and add a one-million-dollar fine arts center. The fine arts center was named the Richard L. Wilson Fine Arts Center in 2009 for the school’s most successful band director from 1995 to 2008. Wilson's bands never placed lower than first place in more than 35 marching band competitions and he led the marching bands to seven consecutive appearances in the bi-annual State Marching Contest. In 2015, the school district received a grant to construct a new high school, located directly behind the current high school. The new high school opened August 2016.

== Classes ==
In addition to the core classes, courses include Sociology, Spanish language, Business Computers, Video Tech, Music Theory, Sports Medicine, and several advanced placement (AP) courses.

== Athletics ==
The Ro-Hawks currently fields teams in football, cross country, volleyball, basketball, power lifting, swimming, tennis, golf, baseball, softball, bowling & track/field.

The girls track and field team placed 7th in 2005 and then won the 2A State Championship three consecutive times in 2006, 2007, and 2008, making it the first high school in the San Antonio area to repeat since 1989. In 2009, the team took their first 2nd place title. In 2012, the team won their 4th state championship in girls track and field.

In 2015 the Boys' Basketball team made their 3rd trip (1992, 1994) to the UIL State Basketball Tournament at the Alamodome in San Antonio. The #21 ranked Ro-Hawks eliminated #20 Childress HS in the Semi-Finals 31-29 setting up the first State Finals appearance in school history against #1 Brock HS. The Ro-Hawks would fall to the Eagles 37-32 marking the end of a historic season, finishing 31-4 overall.

The school prides itself that its mascot, the "Ro-Hawk", is the only mascot of its kind in Texas and the United States. Ro-Hawk is a combination of the words rocket & hawks. The image is a hawk riding a rocket with a lightning bolt clenched in its talon. Rumor has it that upon opening the school the school board could not decide on a mascot. Half of its members wanted Rockets, which was already in use by nearby Judson High School, and half wanted Hawks, to keep with the Air Force Academy's use of bird mascots (Falcons). So, as a compromise, Ro-Hawks was selected.

== Band ==
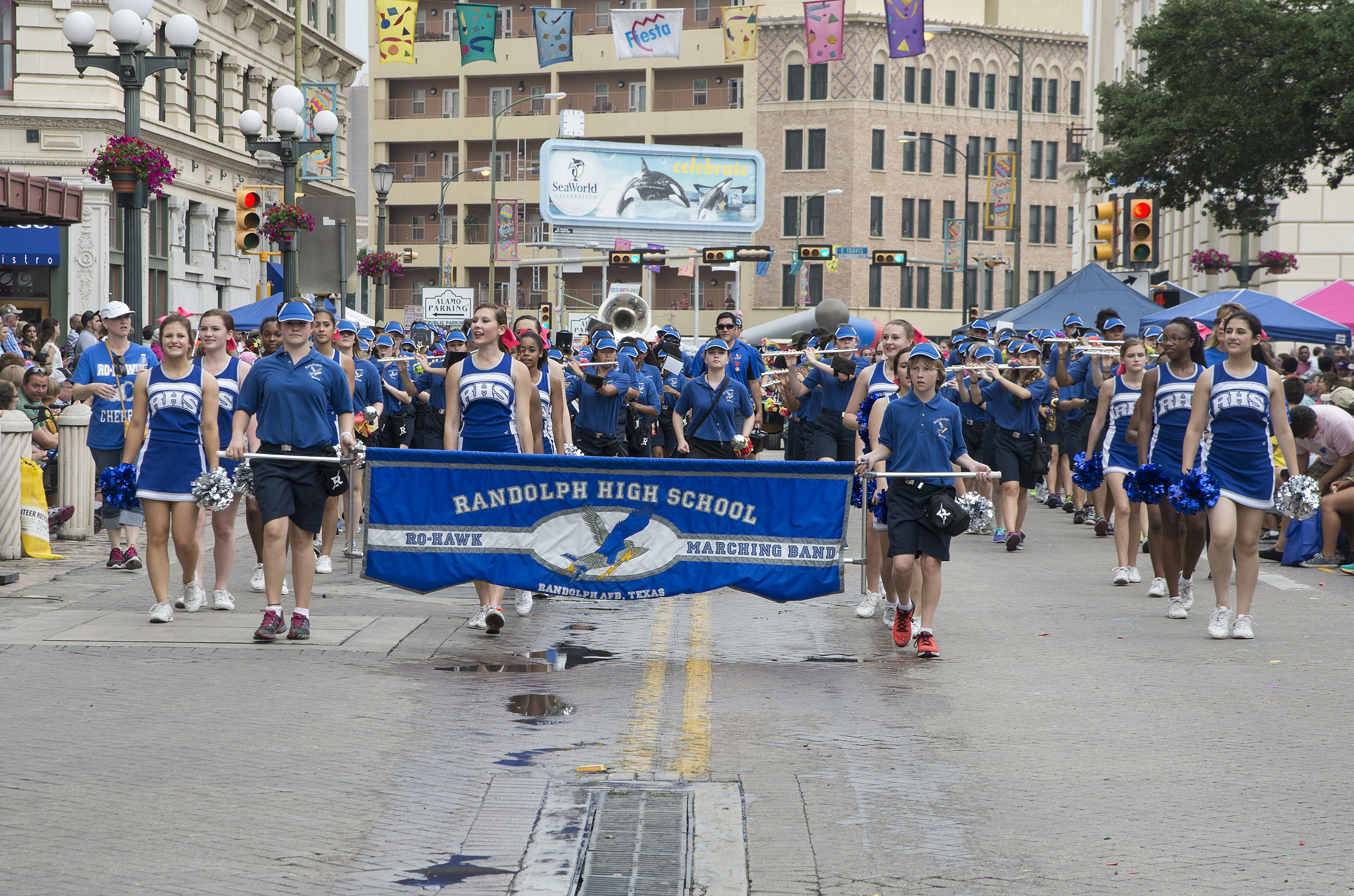
The Randolph High School band performing at the Battle of Flowers Parade on April 24, 2015

The award-winning Mighty Randolph Ro-Hawk Marching Band won every non-UIL marching competition they entered from 1997 to 2009. The band has received a First Division Rating at the UIL Region Contest for 20 consecutive years. They have advanced to the bi-annual UIL Area Marching Contest every possible year since 1995, and they were named Area Champions in 2009. The Ro-Hawk Band advanced to the UIL State Marching Band Championship in every possible year from 1997 to 2009 (1997, 1999, 2001, 2003, 2005, 2007, and 2009). The Ro-Hawk Band's best finish was in 1999, when they placed 7th at the Class AA UIL State Marching Band Championship. Their most recent appearance at the UIL State Championship was in 2009.

== Notable alumni ==
- Carl J. Meade (class of 1968), NASA astronaut
- Michael Shawn Hickenbottom (class of 1983), ring name Shawn Michaels, retired professional wrestler
- Reggie Rivers (class of 1986), former football player, NFL
- Moton Hopkins (class of 2005), former football player, CFL
