= 2001 New Mexico Lobos football team =

American college football season

2001 New Mexico Lobos football
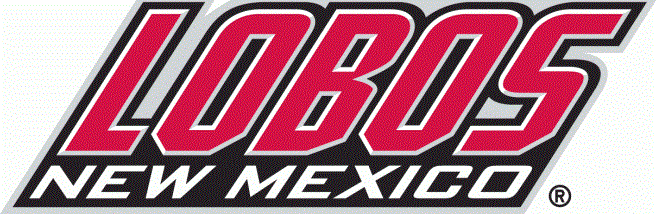
- Conference: Mountain West Conference
- Record: 6–5 (4–3 MW)
- Head coach: Rocky Long (4th season)
- Offensive coordinator: Dan Dodd (2nd season)
- Offensive scheme: Multiple
- Defensive coordinator: Bronco Mendenhall (4th season)
- Base defense: 3–3–5
- Home stadium: University Stadium

2001 Mountain West Conference football standings
	Conf.			Overall
Team	W		L	W		L
No. 25 BYU $	7	–	0	12	–	2
Colorado State	5	–	2	7	–	5
Utah	4	–	3	8	–	4
New Mexico	4	–	3	6	–	5
Air Force	3	–	4	6	–	6
UNLV	3	–	4	4	–	7
San Diego State	2	–	5	3	–	8
Wyoming	0	–	7	2	–	9
$ – Conference champion; Rankings from AP Poll

The 2001 New Mexico Lobos football team represented the University of New Mexico as a member of the Mountain West Conference (MW) during the 2001 NCAA Division I-A football season. Led by fourth-year head coach Rocky Long, the Lobos compiled an overall record of 6–5 with a mark of 4–3 in conference play, tying for third place in the MW. New Mexico played home games at University Stadium in Albuquerque, New Mexico.

The Lobos defeated New Mexico State, 53–0, in the Rio Grande Rivalry, which was their first shutout win in the rivalry since 1952.

== Schedule ==
Date	Time	Opponent	Site	TV	Result	Attendance
September 1	6:00 pm	UTEP*	University Stadium; Albuquerque, NM	KKWB	W 26–6	41,771
September 8	7:00 pm	at Texas Tech*	Jones SBC Stadium; Lubbock, TX		L 30–42	48,924
September 22	6:00 pm	at Baylor*	Floyd Casey Stadium; Waco, TX		L 13–16 ^{OT}	38,396
September 29	1:00 pm	at Utah	Rice–Eccles Stadium; Salt Lake City, UT	ESPN Plus	L 37–16	32,100
October 6	1:00 pm	at Wyoming	War Memorial Stadium; Laramie, WY	SPW	W 30–29	16,241
October 13	1:00 pm	No. 18 BYU	University Stadium; Albuquerque, NM	ESPN Plus	L 20–24	29,036
October 27	4:00 pm	Air Force^{†}	University Stadium; Albuquerque, NM		W 52–33	28,047
November 3	7:00 pm	at San Diego State	Qualcomm Stadium; San Diego, CA	SPW	W 20–15	16,538
November 10	5:00 pm	UNLV	University Stadium; Albuquerque, NM	SPW	W 27–17	27,107
November 17	1:00 pm	Colorado State	University Stadium; Albuquerque, NM		L 17–24	
November 24	1:00 pm	New Mexico State*	University Stadium; Albuquerque, NM (Rio Grande Rivalry)		W 53–0	
*Non-conference game; ^{†}Homecoming; Rankings from AP Poll released prior to the game; All times are in Mountain time

== Roster ==
2001 New Mexico Lobos football team roster
Players			Coaches
Offense: Pos. / # / Name / Class; FB / 28 / Jarrod Baxter / Sr	Defense: Pos. / # / Name / Class	Special teams: Pos. / # / Name / Class	Head coach: Rocky Long; Coordinators/assistant coaches Legend: (C) Team captain; (S) Suspended; (I) Ineligible; Injured; Redshirt
