= Larry Ned =

American football player (born 1978)

No. 28
- Position: Running back

Personal information
- Born: August 23, 1978 (age 48); Eunice, Louisiana, U.S.
- Listed height: 5 ft 11 in (1.80 m)
- Listed weight: 217 lb (98 kg)

Career information
- High school: Rancho Verde (Moreno Valley, California)
- College: San Diego State
- NFL draft: 2002: 6th round, 197th overall pick

Career history
- Oakland Raiders (2002)*; San Diego Chargers (2002)*; Minnesota Vikings (2002–2004); Arizona Cardinals (2005)*
- * Offseason or practice squad member only

Awards and highlights
- Second-team All-American (2001); First-team All-MW (2001); Second-team All-MW (1999)

Career NFL statistics
- Receptions: 1
- Receiving yards: 9
- Stats at Pro Football Reference

Larry Lee Ned Jr. (born August 23, 1978) is an American former professional football player who was a running back in the National Football League (NFL). He was selected by the Oakland Raiders in the sixth round of the 2002 NFL draft, but never played for them and played for the Minnesota Vikings in 2002 and 2003. He played college football for the San Diego State Aztecs.

== College career ==
Larry Ned played at San Diego State University from 1998 to 2001. He was known as a workhorse running back, as his career totals are 765 carries for 3,562 yards, and 36 touchdowns. Ned's senior year in 2001 was his most productive, in which he ran for 1549 yards on 311 carries (most in the NCAA), and scored 15 touchdowns. Ned had 3 games in the 2001 season in which he rushed for over 200 yards, including 285 yards against Eastern Illinois, and 239 yards against BYU. In his final collegiate game against Wyoming, Ned put together the signature performance of his career, rushing a whopping 47 times for 209 yards, and scoring four touchdowns. Ned's 47 carries in a single game remains a school record, and he ranks 4th all time on the San Diego St career rushing list.

In 2018, Larry Ned was inducted into the San Diego St Hall of Fame.

== College Statistics ==
Year	School	G	Rushing				Receiving			
Year	School	G	Att	Yds	Avg	TD	Rec	Yds	Avg	TD
1998	San Diego State	9	153	762	5.0	4	4	21	5.3	0
1999	San Diego State	11	162	894	5.5	11	13	161	12.4	0
2000	San Diego State	6	139	357	2.6	6	6	23	3.8	0
2001	San Diego State	11	311	1549	5.0	15	16	138	8.6	0
Career			765	3562	4.7	36	39	343	8.8	0
