= Moton Hopkins =

American gridiron football player (born 1986)

No. 95
- Position: Defensive tackle

Personal information
- Born: November 20, 1986 (age 39); Miami, Florida, U.S.
- Listed height: 6 ft 2 in (1.88 m)
- Listed weight: 290 lb (132 kg)

Career information
- High school: Randolph High School
- University: Tulsa

Career history
- 2010: Winnipeg Blue Bombers
- 2011–2013: Montreal Alouettes
- 2014–2016: Ottawa Redblacks
- 2017: Edmonton Eskimos*
- * Offseason or practice squad member only

Awards and highlights
- Grey Cup champion (2016); Ottawa Redblacks 2014-2024 All Decade Team; 2018 CFL Diversity Trailblazer; CFL 2010-2019 All Decade Team Nominee; SA Express News 2000-2009 All Decade Team; Tulsa Football 2008-2009 Defensive Player of the Year
- Stats at CFL.ca

Moton Hopkins (born November 20, 1986) is an American former professional football defensive tackle. He was signed by the Winnipeg Blue Bombers of the Canadian Football League (CFL) as a free agent in the spring of 2010. He played college football at the University of Tulsa. He also played for the Montreal Alouettes and Ottawa Redblacks.

== Early life ==
Hopkins was a three-year letter winner at Randolph High School. He started three years at both tight end and defensive end and helped lead his team to a 10–2 record both his junior and senior seasons. He tallied 356 career tackles, 41 stops for lost yards, 22 sacks, six forced fumbles and four fumble recoveries. He totaled 154 tackles, 17 stops for lost yardage, eight sacks and two forced fumbles his junior season. He was named to the all-Greater San Antonio team as a defensive end. He also earned first-team all-district honors on offense and defense, and was a first-team all-state performer. In his senior year, he had 117 tackles, 17 for lost yardage, six sacks, three forced fumbles and three fumble recoveries from his defensive end position. He was named the District MVP, as well as an all-area, all-district and Class 2A all-state selection. had 85 tackles during his sophomore campaign. He was recently named to the San Antonio Express-News All-Decade team (2000-2009) first team defense.

In addition to playing football, he also lettered three years in track and field and powerlifting He also lettered one year in basketball. In his senior year, he was the state champion in the 242 lb. weight class in powerlifting, setting two state records with total weight and dead lift.

== College career ==
He was a four-year letterwinner and three-year starter for the Tulsa Golden Hurricane. He played in all 54 games and had 42 career starts, finished his career by starting 37 consecutive games. He had 216 career tackles and 26.5 stops for -96 yards and was a three-time Conference USA All-Academic Honoree. He was a two-time all-Conference USA second-team selection, in 2007 and 2008.

In 2006, he played in all 13 games and had 40 stops and two stops for -9 yards, while starting 11 games. He earned honorable mention all-Conference USA honors. He had a season-high eight stops and one sack for -7 yards against Stephen F. Austin. He was named the Conference USA Defensive Player of the Week for the game against the Navy Midshipmen, for his 7 tackles and blocked extra point attempt in overtime.

In 2007, he started all 14 games and had 71 tackles and 10 stops for -19 yards. He was an all-Conference USA second-team selection. He had a career-best 11 stops against the Tulane Green Wave, while one stop was for -5 yards.

In 2008, he had 77 tackles for fourth-place on the team, while adding 12 stops for -49 yards, three pass break-ups and two fumble recoveries. He had a season-high eight tackles against both Central Arkansas and Rice Owls. He tallied seven stops and 2.5 tackles for -6 yards against the East Carolina Pirates in the Conference USA Championship Game. He had seven tackles and one stop for -4 yards against the Marshall Thundering Herd. He totaled six stops, 1.5 tackles for -8 yards and one pass breakup against the Tulane Green Wave. He had six tackles and 1.5 stops for -7 yards against the Houston Cougars.

In 2005, he played in all 13 games as a true freshman and had 28 tackles and 2.5 sacks for -19 yards. He was named to the Conference USA All-Freshman Team. He started three games and totaled 11 tackles in those three starts. He was also a member of the University Ambassadors, the Scroll Honor Society and Mortar Board Honor Society. He also, was named the 2008 Tulsa Homecoming King

== Professional career ==
=== Winnipeg Blue Bombers ===
Moton was signed with the Winnipeg Blue Bombers of the Canadian Football League as a free agent in the spring of 2010. Hopkins appeared in 7 games for the Bombers during the 2010 CFL season. For the season he totaled 7 defensive tackles and 1 sack, 1 interception (returned 36 yards for a touchdown) and 1 fumble recovery.

=== Montreal Alouettes ===
Hopkins spent the 2011 and 2013 CFL seasons with the Montreal Alouettes of the CFL. In two seasons with the Als Hopkins amassed 32 tackles, 1 special teams tackle, 5 sacks and 1 fumble recovery.

=== Ottawa RedBlacks ===
The expansion Ottawa Redblacks selected Hopkins with the 3rd overall selection in the 2013 CFL Expansion Draft. In his first season in Ottawa Moton Hopkins contributed 13 tackles, 1 quarterback sack and 1 fumble recovery. During the off-season Hopkins had a workout with the Minnesota Vikings of the NFL. Despite the NFL interest, on February 25, 2015, the Redblacks resigned Hopkins for two more seasons. Moton played in 28 games over the next two seasons, contributing 40 tackles and 7 quarterback sacks. He was not re-signed by the Redblacks following the 2016 season and became a free agent on February 14, 2017. Nevertheless, Hopkins and the Redblacks agreed to a new one-year contract on March 10, 2017. After a successful CFL career that spanned seven seasons, team captain, CFLPA representative, and culminated in a 2016 Grey Cup championship with the Ottawa REDBLACKS, Hopkins retired in June 2017. Hopkins finished his playing career having played 65 games, recording 95 tackles, 14 sacks and two interceptions in the process.

== Coaching career ==
Hopkins became an assistant coach for the Redblacks in the 2017 season working with the defensive line and special teams.
