= Randolph Field Independent School District =

School district in Texas

Location
- Randolph Air Force Base United States

District information
- Type: Public School District
- Grades: Pre-K through 12
- Established: 1932; 94 years ago
- Superintendent: Dr. Brian Holt

Students and staff
- Enrollment: 1,367 as of 2015-2016
- Faculty: ~110

Other information
- Website: www.rfisd.net

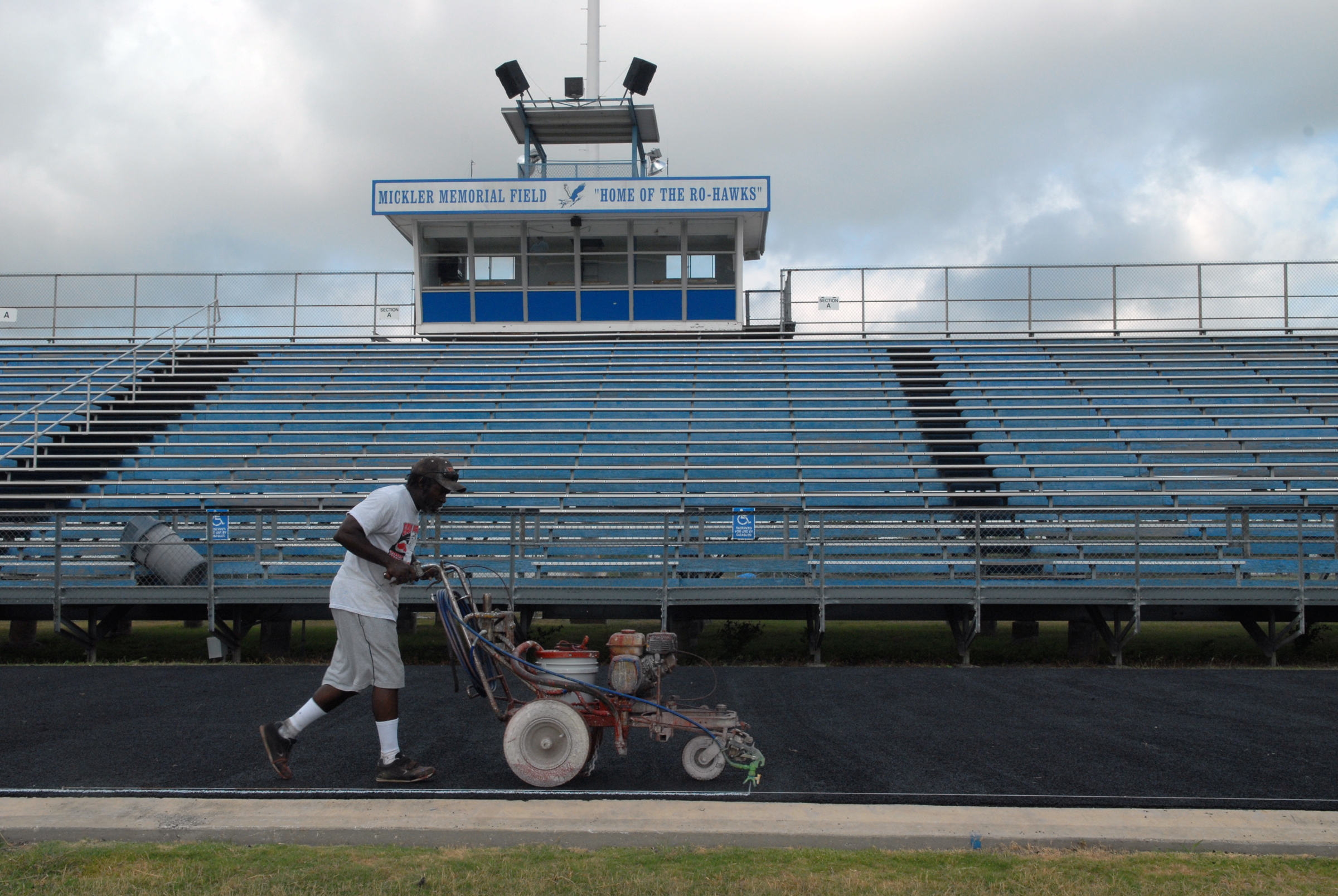
Mickler Memorial Field

Randolph Field Independent School District is a public school district based in Randolph Field, Bexar County, Texas (USA).

== District Information ==
The district serves the children of local military and DoD personnel. So long as a parent or guardian is assigned to Joint-Base San Antonio, the student does not have to physically reside on the base to attend Randolph schools; however, the student must be accepted on a transfer basis in such cases. Pre-kindergarten children are not accepted into the transfer program and must reside on Randolph Air Force Base.

Randolph Field ISD is not part of the Department of Defense Education Activity; it is an independent school district subject to the jurisdiction of the Texas Education Agency. Randolph Field ISD is one of three school districts in the state whose boundaries are coterminous with a military installation; the other two (also in the San Antonio area) are Lackland ISD and Fort Sam Houston ISD. Founded in 1932, it was the first school district in Texas to serve a military installation. As the district's boundaries are coterminous with those of Randolph Air Force Base, the facilities of which by law are exempt from property taxation, the district has no taxable base; thus, funding is provided from United States Department of Education Impact Aid funds and state public school foundation funding.

In 2014, the school district was ranked number 1 in the rankings for the Best School Districts in the Greater San Antonio Area in a field of over 35 school districts. The district is currently ranked 27th out of 1,265 districts in the State of Texas.

In 2009, the school district was rated "recognized" by the Texas Education Agency.

== Schools ==
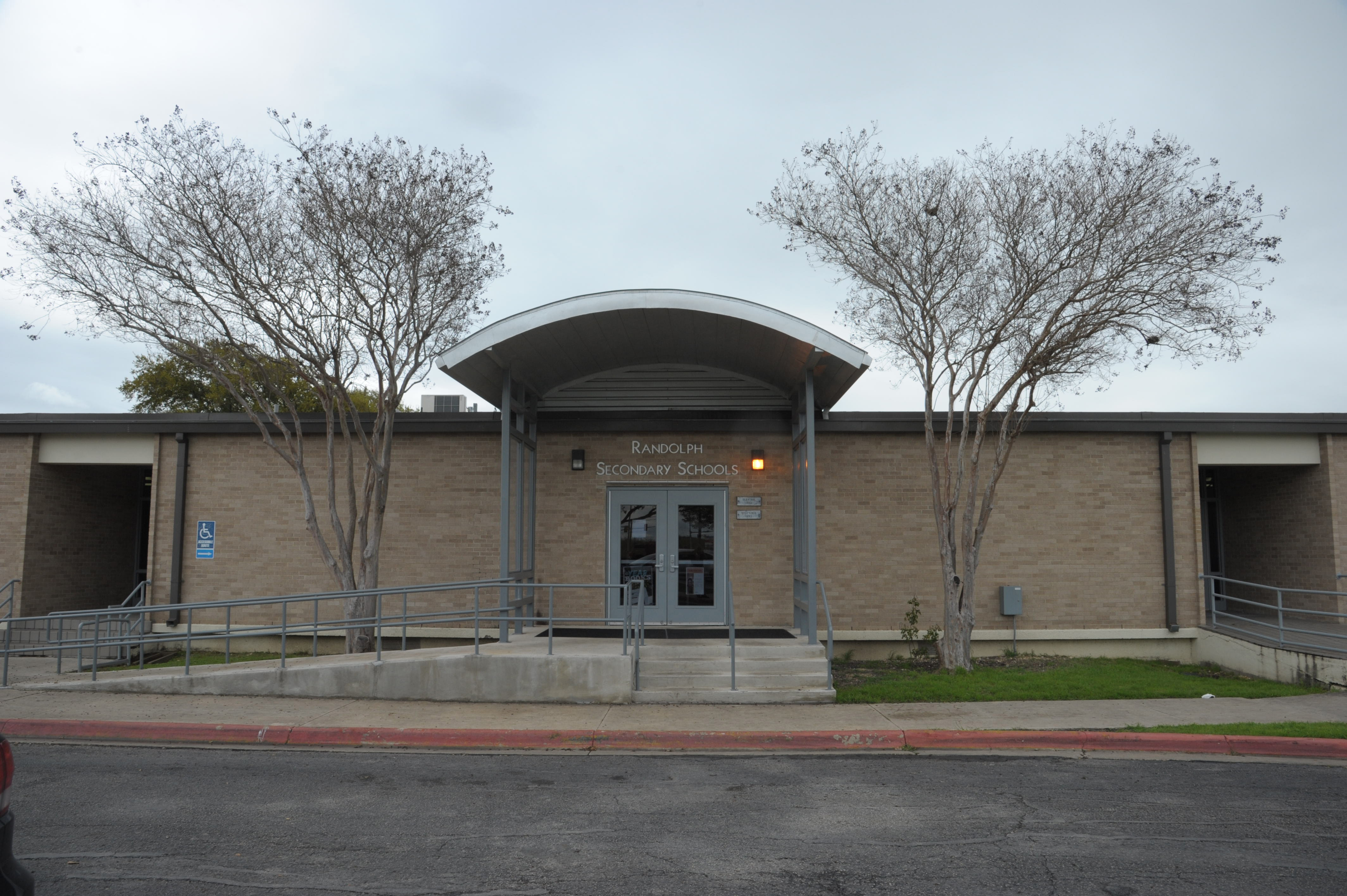
Randolph Secondary Schools

- Randolph High School (Grades 9-12)
- Randolph Middle School (Grades 6-8)
  - National Blue Ribbon School in 2001-02
- Randolph Elementary School (Grades PK-5)
  - National Blue Ribbon School in 2000-01
