= Ron McBride =

American football player and coach (born 1939)

Biographical details
- Born: October 14, 1939 (age 87); South Gate, California, U.S.

Playing career
- 1959–1962: San Jose State
- Position: Linebacker

Coaching career (HC unless noted)
- 1965: San Jose State (FR/DC/LB)
- 1966–1968: Piedmont Hills HS (CA) (DC)
- 1969–1971: Gavilan (OC/OL)
- 1972–1973: UC Riverside (OC)
- 1974–1976: Long Beach State (OC)
- 1977–1982: Utah (OC)
- 1983–1984: Wisconsin (OL)
- 1985–1986: Utah (OL)
- 1987–1989: Arizona (OL)
- 1990–2002: Utah
- 2003–2004: Kentucky (LB)
- 2005–2011: Weber State
- 2013: Utah Blaze (OL)
- 2016: Portland Steel (OL)
- 2017: Salt Lake Screaming Eagles (AHC)

Head coaching record
- Overall: 131–101
- Bowls: 3–3
- Tournaments: 1–2 (NCAA D-I playoffs)

Accomplishments and honors

Championships
- 1 WAC (1995); 1 MWC (1999); 1 Big Sky (2008)

Ronald Douglas McBride (born October 14, 1939) is an American former college football coach. He served as the head football coach at the University of Utah from 1990 to 2002 and at Weber State University from 2005 to 2011, compiling a career college football record of 131–101.

A native of Los Angeles, McBride was an all-city football and baseball standout at South Gate High School. He graduated from San Jose State University where he played for the Spartans from 1959 to 1962 and served as team captain his senior year. He later played professionally with the San Jose Apaches of the USA League.

== Coaching career ==
McBride began his coaching career at San Jose State in 1965, serving as the freshman coach, defensive coordinator and linebackers coach. He then spent two years as an assistant coach at Piedmont Hills High School (1966–1968) and three years as an assistant at Gavilan College (1969–1971), before returning to the NCAA ranks.

From 1972 to 1973, he served as an assistant coach at University of California, Riverside, where he was in charge of the offensive line and served as offensive coordinator. He then served in the same capacities at California State University, Long Beach from 1974 to 1976.

McBride first came to Utah in 1977 to serve as the offensive coordinator and offensive line coach under Wayne Howard. In 1983, he accepted a position as the offensive line coach at the University of Wisconsin–Madison, where he served two seasons before returning to Salt Lake City, coaching the offensive line from 1985 to 1986 under head coach Jim Fassel.

In 1987, he left the Utes to join Dick Tomey's staff at the University of Arizona. He served two years as the offensive line coach and was elevated to assistant head coach during the 1989 season. Following that season he became the head coach at Utah.

=== Head coach at Utah ===
McBride inherited a program that had only had five winning seasons in the previous 16 years, and had not posted a winning season in Western Athletic Conference play since 1985. He didn't take long to turn the program around. In 1991, his second season, he posted a 7–5 record, but a blowout loss to rival BYU kept them out of a bowl. A year later, he led the Utes to the 1992 Copper Bowl, the program's first bowl appearance in 28 years. He took the Utes to six bowl games during his tenure, a noteworthy feat considering the Utes had played in just three bowl games in the previous 97 years. His teams posted bowl wins over USC, Arizona and Fresno State.

"Utah was a soft program, an underachieving program and a program that was going nowhere. Their expectations weren't that high. When they hired me they said, 'Well, if you cannot embarrass us against BYU and be in about the middle of the league, and be respectable you can stay here as long as you want.' The bar was low. The expectations were they just didn't want to get embarrassed on Saturday."
— McBride on the state of Utah football when he took over.

His best season came in 1994 when the Utes won a then-record 10 games and attained the highest post-season ranking, at the time, in school history climbing to No. 8 in the USA Today/ESPN poll and No. 10 in the AP poll. In conference games, he guided the Utes to a 58–42 record and won a share of two conference championships, 1995 in the Western Athletic Conference and 1999 in the Mountain West Conference. McBride excelled in the rivalry games within the state of Utah. His Utes held their own against perennial power BYU; winning six of their last 11 against the Cougars after losing 16 of the previous 18 before he took over. He also dominated Utah State (11–2). In 1998, he was a serious candidate to take over the moribund program at Hawaii, a position that eventually went to June Jones.

McBride's tenure at Utah began to falter in 2000. The Utes were the favorites to win the Mountain West after tying for the conference title a year earlier, but lost their first four games en route to a 4–7 record, their first losing record since McBride's arrival. Season-ticket sales fell 15% as a result, problematic given the costly rebuilding of Rice-Eccles Stadium, and pressure rose to fire McBride. The Utes rebounded in 2001, achieving a winning record and scoring an upset win in the 2001 Las Vegas Bowl over the USC Trojans in Pete Carroll's first season. With the Utes slipping again into a losing season, McBride was fired by Utah after the 2002 season and replaced by Urban Meyer. Despite the inglorious end to McBride's tenure, he is credited with laying the foundation for Utah's rise to national prominence under Meyer and his former defensive coordinator, Kyle Whittingham.

During his tenure at Utah, McBride posted an overall record of 88–63 (.582), at the time the second-most wins in the history of Utah football. He is now third, behind Ike Armstrong and Whittingham.

=== After Utah ===
After leaving Utah, McBride took over as the inside linebacker coach at Kentucky in 2003. He returned to the state of Utah in 2004, when he was named head football coach at Weber State University, an NCAA Division I-AA team that played in the Big Sky Conference. In 2008, the Wildcats won their first Big Sky title in 21 years and reached the postseason for the first time since 1991. He retired after seven seasons in 2011. He has since focused his time in part-time coaching and his foundation, which is dedicated to raising money for schools and churches. McBride was inducted into the Weber State Athletic Hall of Fame in 2021.

== Head coaching record ==
Year	Team	Overall	Conference	Standing	Bowl/playoffs	Coaches^{#}	AP/TSN^{°}
Utah Utes (Western Athletic Conference) (1990–1998)
1990	Utah	4–7	2–6	7th			
1991	Utah	7–5	4–4	4th			
1992	Utah	6–6	4–4	T–5th	L Copper		
1993	Utah	7–6	5–3	4th	L Freedom		
1994	Utah	10–2	6–2	T–2nd	W Freedom	8	10
1995	Utah	7–4	6–2	T–1st			
1996	Utah	8–4	6–2	T–2nd (Mountain)	L Copper		
1997	Utah	6–5	5–3	T–2nd (Mountain)			
1998	Utah	7–4	5–3	T–3rd (Pacific)			
Utah Utes (Mountain West Conference) (1999–2002)
1999	Utah	9–3	5–2	T–1st	W Las Vegas		
2000	Utah	4–7	3–4	T–5th			
2001	Utah	8–4	4–3	T–3rd	W Las Vegas		
2002	Utah	5–6	3–4	T–5th			
Utah:		88–63	58–42				
Weber State Wildcats (Big Sky Conference) (2005–2010)
2005	Weber State	6–5	4–3	T–4th			
2006	Weber State	4–7	3–5	T–6th			
2007	Weber State	5–6	4–4	5th			
2008	Weber State	10–4	7–1	1st	L NCAA Division I Quarterfinal	9	7
2009	Weber State	7–5	6–2	2nd	L NCAA Division I First Round	17	15
2010	Weber State	6–5	5–3	T–3rd			
2011	Weber State	5–6	5–3	T–3rd			
Weber State:		43–38	34–22				
Total:		131–101					
National championship Conference title Conference division title or championship game berth
