= Fort Sam Houston Independent School District =

School district in Texas

Coordinates: 29.4783°N 98.4231°W

Location
- Fort Sam Houston, Texas ESC Region United States

District information
- Type: Special Purpose Public
- Grades: PK through 12
- Established: 1952
- Superintendent: Dr. Gary Bates

Students and staff
- Athletic conference: UIL Class AAA
- Colors: green and gold

Other information
- Mascot: cougar
- Website: Fort Sam Houston ISD

Fort Sam Houston Independent School District (FSHISD) is a public school district based in San Antonio, Texas (United States).

The district includes Fort Sam Houston. It also takes dependents of people working for the military who live on Fort Sam Houston and Camp Bullis. The boundaries of the district include those two properties.

== History ==
The district was formed in 1951 and opened for class in September 1952 for the purpose of serving the children of military personnel residing on Fort Sam Houston and Camp Bullis; previously, the children were assigned to surrounding districts. Initially only grades 1-6 were offered, but in 1961 construction began on a junior/senior high school to offer secondary education (grades 7–12) on post. The 6th grade was later moved to the junior/senior high school and the PK and kindergarten grades later added.

== Eligibility ==
Currently, only students whose parents physically reside on either Fort Sam Houston or Camp Bullis have automatic right to attend Fort Sam Houston ISD schools; students whose parents are assigned to either installation, but reside off-post, can be accepted as transfer students, but the parents must provide transportation.

== Jurisdiction ==
Fort Sam Houston ISD is not part of the Department of Defense Education Activity school system; it is an independent school district subject to the jurisdiction of the Texas Education Agency. It is one of three school districts in the state whose boundaries are coterminous with a military installation; the other two (also in the San Antonio area) are Randolph Field and Lackland. As the district's boundaries are coterminous with those of Fort Sam Houston, the facilities of which by law are exempt from property taxation, the district has no taxable base; thus, funding is provided from U.S. Department of Education Impact Aid funds and state public school foundation funding.

== Schools ==
- Robert G. Cole Junior-Senior High School (Grades 6–12)
- Fort Sam Houston Elementary School (Grades PK-5)
  - National Blue Ribbon School in 1993-94
