= 2001 San Diego State Aztecs football team =

American college football season

2001 San Diego State Aztecs football
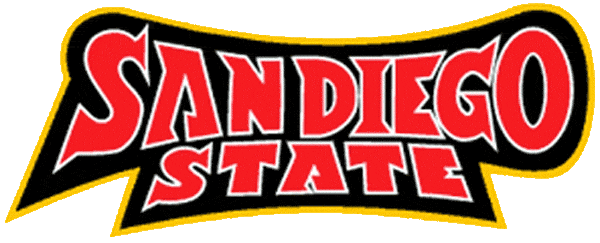
- Conference: Mountain West Conference
- Record: 3–8 (2–5 MW)
- Head coach: Ted Tollner (8th season)
- Offensive coordinator: Dave Lay (9th season)
- Offensive scheme: Pro-style
- Defensive coordinator: Ken Delgado (2nd season)
- Base defense: 4–3
- Home stadium: Qualcomm Stadium

2001 Mountain West Conference football standings
	Conf.			Overall
Team	W		L	W		L
No. 25 BYU $	7	–	0	12	–	2
Colorado State	5	–	2	7	–	5
Utah	4	–	3	8	–	4
New Mexico	4	–	3	6	–	5
Air Force	3	–	4	6	–	6
UNLV	3	–	4	4	–	7
San Diego State	2	–	5	3	–	8
Wyoming	0	–	7	2	–	9
$ – Conference champion; Rankings from AP Poll

The 2001 San Diego State Aztecs football team represented San Diego State University in the 2001 NCAA Division I-A football season. The Aztecs were led by head coach Ted Tollner, who was fired after the season, and they played their home games at Qualcomm Stadium.

The Aztecs finished the season 3–8, with a 2–5 record in the Mountain West Conference. They closed out the season with a win over Wyoming in Tollner's final game as head coach. Running back Larry Ned set a school record in the Wyoming game with 47 carries, and finished his career with the second-most rushing yards in school history, behind Hall of Famer Marshall Faulk.

== Schedule ==
Date	Time	Opponent	Site	TV	Result	Attendance
August 30	7:00 pm	Arizona*	Qualcomm Stadium; San Diego, CA	ESPN2	L 10–23	29,386
September 8	7:00 pm	at Arizona State*	Sun Devil Stadium; Tempe, AZ		L 7–38	54,071
September 22	4:00 pm	at Colorado State	Hughes Stadium; Fort Collins, CO	ABC	W 14–7	29,110
September 29	8:00 pm	Air Force	Qualcomm Stadium; San Diego, CA	ESPN2	L 21–45	22,193
October 6	8:00 pm	No. 9 (I-AA) Eastern Illinois*	Qualcomm Stadium; San Diego, CA		W 40–7	20,064
October 13	4:00 pm	at UNLV	Sam Boyd Stadium; Whitney, NV	ABC	L 3–31	22,100
October 20	9:00 am	at Ohio State*	Ohio Stadium; Columbus, OH	ESPN+	L 12–27	102,432
October 27	6:00 pm	No. 16 BYU	Qualcomm Stadium; San Diego, CA	SPW	L 21–59	30,064
November 3	6:00 pm	New Mexico	Qualcomm Stadium; San Diego, CA	SPW	L 15–20	16,538
November 10	12:00 pm	at Utah	Rice–Eccles Stadium; Salt Lake City, UT		L 3–17	36,018
November 17	7:00 pm	Wyoming	Qualcomm Stadium; San Diego, CA	SPW	W 38–16	16,864
*Non-conference game; Rankings from AP Poll released prior to the game; All times are in Pacific time

== Aztecs in the 2002 NFL Draft ==
Round	Pick	Player	Position	NFL club
2	50	Chester Pitts	OT	Houston Texans
6	197	Larry Ned	RB	Oakland Raiders
6	200	Mike Houghton	OG	Green Bay Packers

Will Demps was also a member of the 2002 class, and went undrafted, but was signed by the Baltimore Ravens played for 7 NFL seasons.
