= 2001 Wyoming Cowboys football team =

American college football season

2001 Wyoming Cowboys football
- Conference: Mountain West Conference
- Record: 2–9 (0–7 MW)
- Head coach: Vic Koenning (2nd season)
- Offensive coordinator: Rusty Burns (2nd season)
- Offensive scheme: Spread
- Defensive coordinator: Matt Wallerstedt (2nd season)
- Base defense: 3–4
- Home stadium: War Memorial Stadium

2001 Mountain West Conference football standings
	Conf.			Overall
Team	W		L	W		L
No. 25 BYU $	7	–	0	12	–	2
Colorado State	5	–	2	7	–	5
Utah	4	–	3	8	–	4
New Mexico	4	–	3	6	–	5
Air Force	3	–	4	6	–	6
UNLV	3	–	4	4	–	7
San Diego State	2	–	5	3	–	8
Wyoming	0	–	7	2	–	9
$ – Conference champion; Rankings from AP Poll

The 2001 Wyoming Cowboys football team represented the University of Wyoming as a member Mountain West Conference (MW) during the 2001 NCAA Division I-A football season. Led by second-year head coach Vic Koenning, the Cowboys compiled an overall record of 2–9 record with mark 0–7 in conference play, placing last out of eight teams in the MW. The team played home games at War Memorial Stadium in Laramie, Wyoming.

== Schedule ==
Date	Time	Opponent	Site	TV	Result	Attendance	Source
September 1	2:00 pm	No. 6 (I-AA) Furman*	War Memorial Stadium; Laramie, WY		W 20–14	14,167	
September 6	8:00 pm	Texas A&M*	War Memorial Stadium; Laramie, WY	ESPN2	L 20–28	18,131	
September 23	7:05 pm	at Utah State*	Romney Stadium; Logan, UT (rivalry)	SPW	W 43–42	27,235	
September 29	1:00 pm	Colorado State	War Memorial Stadium; Laramie, WY (Border War)		L 14–42	26,617	
October 6	1:00 pm	New Mexico	War Memorial Stadium; Laramie, WY	SPW	L 29–30	16,241	
October 13	1:00 pm	at Air Force	Falcon Stadium; USAFA, CO		L 13–24	44,258	
October 20	1:00 pm	at Utah	Rice–Eccles Stadium; Salt Lake City, UT	ESPN Plus	L 0–35	36,795	
October 27	4:00 pm	UNLV	War Memorial Stadium; Laramie, WY	SPW	L 26–47	11,299	
November 10	1:00 pm	No. 9 BYU	War Memorial Stadium; Laramie, WY	ESPN Plus	L 34–41	15,277	
November 17	8:00 pm	at San Diego State	Qualcomm Stadium; San Diego, CA	SPW	L 16–38	16,864	
November 24	12:00 pm	at Kansas*	Memorial Stadium; Lawrence, KS		L 14–27	24,000	
*Non-conference game; Rankings from AP Poll released prior to the game; All times are in Mountain time
