= 2001 Colorado State Rams football team =

American college football season

2001 Colorado State Rams football
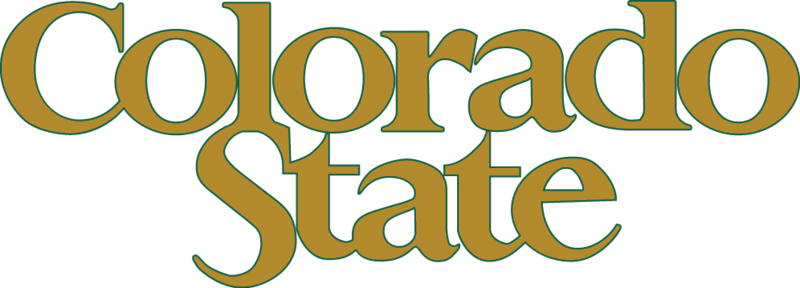

New Orleans Bowl champion

New Orleans Bowl, W 45–20 vs. North Texas
- Conference: Mountain West Conference
- Record: 7–5 (5–2 MW)
- Head coach: Sonny Lubick (9th season)
- Co-offensive coordinators: John Benton (1st season); Dan Hammerschmidt (1st season)
- Defensive coordinator: Larry Kerr (9th season)
- Home stadium: Hughes Stadium

2001 Mountain West Conference football standings
	Conf.			Overall
Team	W		L	W		L
No. 25 BYU $	7	–	0	12	–	2
Colorado State	5	–	2	7	–	5
Utah	4	–	3	8	–	4
New Mexico	4	–	3	6	–	5
Air Force	3	–	4	6	–	6
UNLV	3	–	4	4	–	7
San Diego State	2	–	5	3	–	8
Wyoming	0	–	7	2	–	9
$ – Conference champion; Rankings from AP Poll

The 2001 Colorado State Rams football team represented Colorado State University in the 2001 NCAA Division I-A football season. The team was led by ninth-year head coach Sonny Lubick and played its home games at Hughes Stadium. It finished the regular season with a 6–5 record overall and a 5–2 record in Mountain West Conference games. The team was selected to play in the New Orleans Bowl, in which it defeated North Texas.

== Schedule ==
Date	Time	Opponent	Rank	Site	TV	Result	Attendance
September 1	1:30 pm	vs. Colorado*	No. 24	Invesco Field at Mile High; Denver, CO (Rocky Mountain Showdown)		L 14–41	47,762
September 8	3:05 pm	Nevada*		Hughes Stadium; Fort Collins, CO		W 35–18	26,367
September 22	5:00 pm	San Diego State		Hughes Stadium; Fort Collins, CO		L 7–14	29,110
September 29	1:00 pm	at Wyoming		War Memorial Stadium; Laramie, WY (Border War)		W 42–14	26,617
October 4	5:30 pm	at Louisville*		Papa John's Cardinal Stadium; Louisville, KY		L 2–7	39,389
October 13	8:00 pm	No. 8 Fresno State*		Hughes Stadium; Fort Collins, CO		L 22–25 ^{OT}	31,580
October 20	5:00 pm	at UNLV		Sam Boyd Stadium; Las Vegas, NV		W 26–24	20,049
October 27	1:00 pm	Utah		Hughes Stadium; Fort Collins, CO		W 19–17	24,119
November 1	7:45 pm	at No. 13 BYU		LaVell Edwards Stadium; Provo, UT		L 34–56	63,478
November 8	5:30 pm	Air Force		Hughes Stadium; Fort Collins, CO (rivalry)		W 28–21	26,638
November 17	1:00 pm	at New Mexico		University Stadium; Albuquerque, NM		W 24–17	
December 18	6:00 pm	vs. North Texas*		Louisiana Superdome; New Orleans, LA (New Orleans Bowl)	ESPN2	W 45–20	27,004
*Non-conference game; Rankings from AP Poll released prior to the game; All times are in Mountain time

== Roster ==
2001 Colorado State Rams football team roster
Players
Coaches
Offense

Pos.	#	Name	Class
TE	81	Joel Dreessen	Fr
RB	32	Cecil Sapp	Jr
QB	11	Bradlee Van Pelt	So

Defense

Pos.	#	Name	Class
DE	78	Chris Kiffin	Fr
DB	20	Rhett Nelson	Jr
DT	95	Bryan Save	So
DB	37	David Vickers	Jr
DE	96	Andre Sommersell	So

Special teams

Pos.	#	Name	Class

Head coach

- Sark Arslanian

Coordinators/assistant coaches

Legend

- (C) Team captain
- (S) Suspended
- (I) Ineligible
- Injured
- Redshirt

Roster
