= 2001 Air Force Falcons football team =

American college football season

2001 Air Force Falcons football
- Conference: Mountain West Conference
- Record: 6–6 (3–4 MW)
- Head coach: Fisher DeBerry (18th season)
- Offensive scheme: Wishbone triple option
- Defensive coordinator: Richard Bell (7th season)
- Base defense: 3–4
- Captains: Keith Boyea; Ben Miller; Zach Johnson
- Home stadium: Falcon Stadium

2001 Mountain West Conference football standings
| | Conf. | | | Overall |
| Team | W | | L | W | | L |
|---|---|---|---|---|---|---|
| No. 25 BYU $ | 7 | – | 0 | 12 | – | 2 |
| Colorado State | 5 | – | 2 | 7 | – | 5 |
| Utah | 4 | – | 3 | 8 | – | 4 |
| New Mexico | 4 | – | 3 | 6 | – | 5 |
| Air Force | 3 | – | 4 | 6 | – | 6 |
| UNLV | 3 | – | 4 | 4 | – | 7 |
| San Diego State | 2 | – | 5 | 3 | – | 8 |
| Wyoming | 0 | – | 7 | 2 | – | 9 |
$ – Conference champion; Rankings from AP Poll

The 2001 Air Force Falcons football team represented the United States Air Force Academy as a member of the Mountain West Conference (MW) during the 2001 NCAA Division I-A football season. Led by 18th-year head coach Fisher DeBerry, the Falcons compiled an overall record of 6–6 with a mark of 3–4 in conference play, tying for fifth place in the MW. The team played home games at Falcon Stadium in Colorado Springs, Colorado

== Schedule ==
| Date | Opponent | Site | TV | Result | Attendance |
|---|---|---|---|---|---|
| September 1 | No. 3 Oklahoma* | Falcon Stadium; Colorado Springs, CO | ABC | L 3–44 | 56,162 |
| September 8 | Tennessee Tech* | Falcon Stadium; Colorado Springs, CO | | W 42–0 | 28,525 |
| September 29 | at San Diego State | Qualcomm Stadium; San Diego, CA | ESPN2 | W 45–21 | 22,193 |
| October 6 | vs. Navy* | FedExField; Landover, MD | | W 24–18 | 36,251 |
| October 13 | Wyoming | Falcon Stadium; Colorado Springs, CO | | W 24–13 | 44,258 |
| October 20 | at No. 18 BYU | LaVell Edwards Stadium; Provo, UT | ESPN2 | L 33–63 | 62,382 |
| October 27 | at New Mexico | University Stadium; Albuquerque, NM | | L 33–52 | 28,047 |
| November 3 | Army* | Falcon Stadium; Colorado Springs, CO (College GameDay) | | W 34–24 | 44,910 |
| November 8 | at Colorado State | Hughes Stadium; Fort Collins, CO (rivalry) | ESPN | L 21–28 | 26,638 |
| November 17 | UNLV | Falcon Stadium; Colorado Springs, CO | | L 10–34 | 31,074 |
| November 24 | at Hawaii* | Aloha Stadium; Halawa, HI (rivalry) | | L 30–52 | 41,148 |
| December 1 | Utah | Falcon Stadium; Colorado Springs, CO | | W 38–37 | 25,702 |
*Non-conference game; Rankings from AP Poll released prior to the game
