= Luke Staley =

American football player (born 1980)

No. 33
- Position: Running back

Personal information
- Born: September 16, 1980 (age 46); Bountiful, Utah, U.S.
- Listed height: 6 ft 1 in (1.85 m)
- Listed weight: 227 lb (103 kg)

Career information
- High school: Tualatin (Tualatin, Oregon)
- College: BYU (1999–2001)
- NFL draft: 2002: 7th round, 214th overall pick

Career history
- Detroit Lions (2002)

Awards and highlights
- Doak Walker Award (2001); Jim Brown Award (2001); Consensus All-American (2001); MW Offensive Player of the Year (2001); MW Freshman of the Year (1999); First-team All-MW (2001); Second-team All-MW (2000); BYU Cougars No. 6 retired

Lucas Staley (born September 16, 1980) is an American former college football player who was a running back for the BYU Cougars. Staley was a consensus All-American and received the Doak Walker Award as the best college running back in the nation in 2001. He was selected by the Detroit Lions in the seventh round of the 2002 NFL draft, but he suffered a career-ending knee injury before appearing in a regular season pro football game.

== Early life ==
Staley was born in Bountiful, Utah and raised as a member of the Church of Jesus Christ of Latter-day Saints. He attended Tualatin High School in Tualatin, Oregon, where he was a letterman in football, basketball, and track. He played high school football for the Tualatin Timberwolves. As a senior in 1999, Staley was named Gatorade Player of the Year and USA Today Player of the Year for the state of Oregon. He was also named The Oregonian's Player of the Year, earned all-state honors on offense and defense, and was conference Player of the Year for offense, defense, and special teams. He averaged over 300 yards per game during Tualatin's four-game playoff run. Staley was listed as a Blue Chip Top-100 player.

In track & field, Staley recorded times of 11.03 seconds in the 100-meter dash, 22.70 seconds in the 200-meter dash and 43.6 seconds in the 4 x 100 metres relay.

== College career ==
Staley attended Brigham Young University, and played for the BYU Cougars from 1999 to 2001. In three years at BYU, Staley established himself as one of the best running backs in school history, and posted the best single season of any BYU back in history. In his first game as a Cougar, Staley scored three touchdowns to lead BYU to a 34−13 victory over Colorado State in the first-ever Mountain West Conference (MWC) football game. Despite some nagging injuries that limited his playing time, he continued his impressive play, finishing the season with 92 rushes for 432 yards and 10 touchdowns, and added 26 receptions for 339 yards and 3 touchdowns. He led the MWC in scoring, averaging 9.8 points per game. For his efforts, Staley was named Mountain West Conference Freshman of the Year, and Sporting News third-team Freshman All-American.

As a sophomore in 2000, Staley started 10 games and led the team with 479 yards (on 130 carries) and scored seven touchdowns. He added 28 receptions for 327 yards. In BYU's 10−7 victory over UNLV, Staley rushed for 167 yards and was named MWC Offensive Player of the Week. He also received awards from BYU's coaching staff for games against Air Force, UNLV, and Colorado State.

In 2001, under new head coach Gary Crowton, the Cougars started the season with a 12–0 record and led the NCAA in scoring (46.8 points per game) and total offense (542.9 yards per game). In 11 games, Staley rushed for 1,582 yards and 24 touchdowns (both totals broke school records). His rushing average (8.1 yards per carry) led the NCAA, and his 143.8 rushing yards per game ranked third nationally. Staley added 32 receptions for 334 yards and four touchdowns; he led the nation in total touchdowns (28) and scoring (15.5 points per game).

In recognition of his accomplishments, Staley received the Doak Walker Award, and the Jim Brown Award, both given annually to college football's top running back. He was also a first-team All-Mountain West Conference selection, and was recognized as a consensus first-team All-American, having received first-team honors from the American Football Coaches Association, the Associated Press, CNN/SI, Football News, the Football Writers Association of America, and the Walter Camp Foundation.

== Professional career ==
Staley decided to forgo his senior season at BYU and entered the 2002 NFL draft. However, because of his injury-prone past, Staley was not selected until the seventh round (214th overall) by the Detroit Lions. He participated in Lions' training camp as a rookie, but suffered a knee injury that required a season-ending surgery.

He attended training camp the following season but was waived on August 25, 2003.

== Personal life ==
Staley lives in Draper, Utah with his wife Heather, and they have 2 sons. As of 2016, he has undergone 23 separate surgeries, as a result of the injuries he suffered playing football.

In 2017, Staley's number #6 jersey was retired by BYU.

== See also ==
- List of NCAA major college football yearly scoring leaders
