= John Denney =

American football player (born 1978)

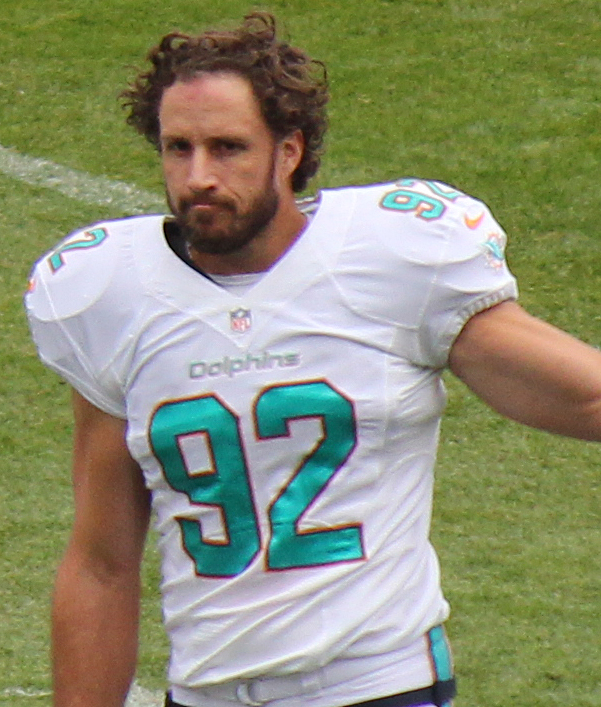
- Denney in 2014

No. 97, 92
- Position: Long snapper

Personal information
- Born: December 13, 1978 (age 47); Denver, Colorado, U.S.
- Listed height: 6 ft 5 in (1.96 m)
- Listed weight: 255 lb (116 kg)

Career information
- High school: Horizon (Thornton, Colorado)
- College: Ricks College (2000–2001); BYU (2001–2005)
- NFL draft: 2005: undrafted

Career history
- Miami Dolphins (2005–2018); New Orleans Saints (2020)*
- * Offseason or practice squad member only

Awards and highlights
- 2× Pro Bowl (2010, 2012)

Career NFL statistics
- Games played: 224
- Total tackles: 50
- Forced fumbles: 1
- Fumble recoveries: 3
- Stats at Pro Football Reference

John Sifford Denney (born December 13, 1978) is an American former professional football player who was a long snapper for the Miami Dolphins of the National Football League (NFL). He played college football for the BYU Cougars, and was signed by the Dolphins as an undrafted free agent in 2005.

== Early life ==
Denney was born in Denver, Colorado, to Craig and Sheri Denney. He learned to play the violin at age 5 and was an Eagle Scout. A member of the LDS Church, Denney served a church mission to Morristown, New Jersey. As a child, he was a fan of the Denver Broncos.

Denney attended Westlake Middle School. Denney was a three-year letterman at Horizon High School in Thornton, Colorado. As a senior, he earned first-team all-conference honors, second-team all-state honors and was his team's Special Teams Player of the Year. A three-time academic all-conference selection, Denney graduated from Horizon in 1997 with National Student-Athlete honors.

== College career ==
=== Ricks College ===
Denney was recruited by Northern Colorado, Chadron State, and Mesa State, and chose to attend Ricks College, now Brigham Young University-Idaho. He earned All-Region 18 honors as a freshman and helped the school to a 44–14 win over Snow College in the Real Dairy Bowl. In that game, Denney recorded two sacks and two pass deflections.

=== Brigham Young University ===
After a season at Ricks College, Denney transferred to Brigham Young University and was redshirted in 2001.

A neck injury sidelined Denney early during his sophomore season in 2002, but he went on to start seven games at left defensive end for the team. He recorded 25 tackles (eight solo) on the season, including five-tackle performances against Colorado State and Utah. Additionally, Denney earned Academic All-Mountain West honors.

As a junior in 2003, Denney earned Academic All-Mountain West honors for the second straight season while starting 12 games at defensive end. He finished the season with 42 tackles (seventh on the team), six tackles for a loss and 4.5 sacks. He was named the team's Defensive Player of the Game twice, against USC and Wyoming.

Denney recorded 27 tackles (8.5 for losses) during his senior season in addition to 4.5 sacks and a forced fumble. Following the season, he was chosen to play in the Hula Bowl.

During his three-year career at BYU, Denney started 29 of the 32 games in which he played and recorded 94 tackles. He also handled long snapping duties for the Cougars throughout his career. He majored in business management.

== Professional career ==
=== Miami Dolphins ===
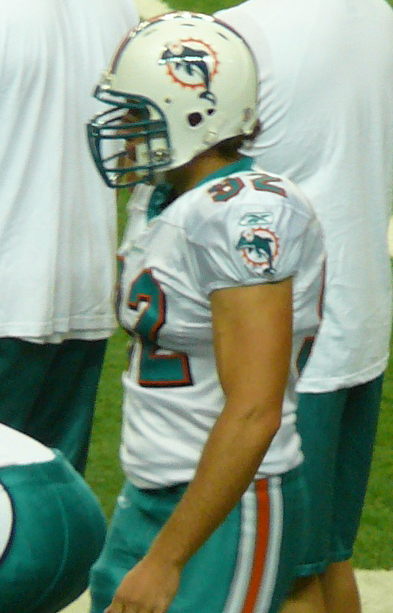
Denny in 2009

After going undrafted in the 2005 NFL draft, Denney was signed by the Miami Dolphins. He beat out incumbent Ed Perry for the team's long snapping duties, holding the job the entire 2005 season and keeping it throughout the rest of his tenure. He was the only undrafted free agent for the Dolphins to appear in every game that season. He recorded five tackles on special teams during the year, including a season-high two stops against the San Diego Chargers on December 11.

In February 2006, Denney underwent surgery on an injured elbow. He played in every game for the Dolphins for the second straight season, recording five tackles. Denney recorded two tackles and recovered a Brad Kassell fumble on a punt against the New York Jets on December 25, leading to a game-tying Olindo Mare field goal in the fourth quarter.

On March 22, 2007, the Dolphins re-signed Denney to a four-year contract through the 2010 season. That season, he appeared in all 16 games for the Dolphins for the third straight year and recorded three special teams tackles.

Through his first three NFL seasons, Dolphins placekickers made all 81 extra point attempts and 80.9 percent of the field goals (72 of 89) for which Denney was the snapper.

On August 15, 2013, Denney signed a three-year extension at an $1,150,029 average per year.

On March 9, 2017, Denney re-signed with the Dolphins.

On March 15, 2018, Denney re-signed with the Dolphins for one year. As of the 2018 season, he is the longest tenured player on the Dolphins roster, having been with the team since 2005. He is second in Dolphins history in games played, behind only Pro Football Hall of Famer Dan Marino.

On February 8, 2019, Denney signed a one-year contract extension with the Dolphins. He was released on September 2, as the longest-tenured Dolphin.

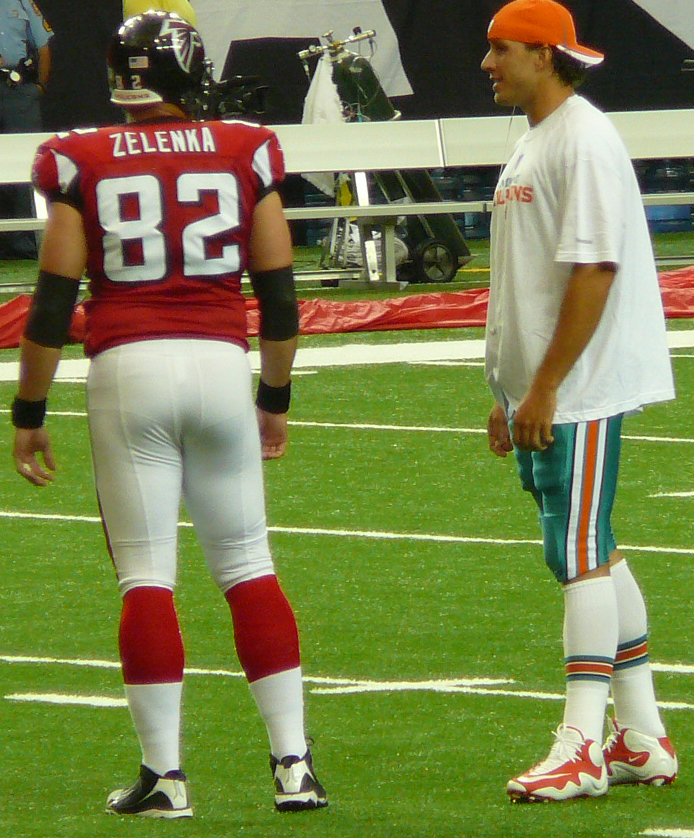
Denney (right) with Falcons' long snapper Joe Zelenka in 2011.

=== New Orleans Saints ===
On January 11, 2021, Denney was signed to the New Orleans Saints' practice squad. On January 13, Denney was released, but re-signed with the team's practice squad on January 16. Denney's practice squad contract with the team expired after the season on January 25.

== Personal life ==
Denney is the younger brother of former Buffalo Bills defensive end Ryan Denney. Their younger brother, Brett, was also a defensive end for the Cougars.

Denney and his wife Christy have three sons and two daughters - Austin, Brock, Weston, Gracie, and Bailey. He lists his favorite movie as The Endless Summer II, favorite TV show as Seinfeld and favorite recording artist as Dave Matthews.

In 2016, Denney earned a Master of Business Administration degree from the University of Miami Business School.

== See also ==
- List of most consecutive games played by National Football League players
