= Brandon Doman =

American football player and coach (born 1976)

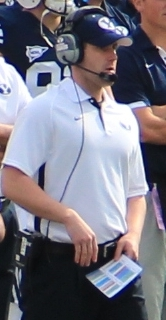

No. 11
- Position: Quarterback

Personal information
- Born: December 29, 1976 (age 49); Salt Lake City, Utah, U.S.
- Listed height: 6 ft 1 in (1.85 m)
- Listed weight: 210 lb (95 kg)

Career information
- High school: Skyline (Millcreek, Utah)
- College: BYU
- NFL draft: 2002: 5th round, 163rd overall pick

Career history

Playing
- San Francisco 49ers (2002); Buffalo Bills (2003)*; Washington Redskins (2003)*; San Francisco 49ers (2004)
- * Offseason or practice squad member only

Coaching
- BYU (2005–2010) Quarterbacks coach; BYU (2011–2012) Offensive coordinator & quarterbacks coach

Awards and highlights
- First-team All-MW (2001)

Brandon Doman (born December 29, 1976) is an American football player and coach. He is the former offensive coordinator for the Brigham Young University (BYU) Cougars. Doman played quarterback for BYU in 2000-2001 and was drafted by the San Francisco 49ers in the 2002 NFL draft. He was the offensive coordinator at BYU in 2011-2012 before being replaced in 2013 by Robert Anae.

== Playing career ==
Doman tied a BYU school record by winning his first fourteen starts as a starter, including the final game of head coach LaVell Edwards in 2000. During the 2001 season, the "Domanator" and BYU won twelve straight games to begin the season before losing their final two. Doman completed 261 of 408 passes that year (64% completions), finishing with 3,542 passing yards and 33 touchdowns. He was drafted by the San Francisco 49ers in the fifth round of the 2002 NFL Draft.

== Coaching career ==
Doman was hired by Bronco Mendenhall as quarterbacks coach at BYU in 2005. In 2011, he was named offensive coordinator when Anae left for the University of Arizona.

== Personal life ==
Doman was raised in Salt Lake City, Utah and graduated from Skyline High School in 1995. His three brothers (Kevin, Bryce, and Cliff) also played football at BYU. Brandon Doman is a member of the Church of Jesus Christ of Latter-day Saints. He served the church as a missionary in Bahía Blanca, Argentina (1996-1998). He graduated from BYU with a bachelor's degree in business in 2002. He is married to Alisha Barker and they have six children. In May 2021, he was called as president of the church's Alpine Utah YSA Stake.
