= Military Spouse =

American magazine for military dependents

Military Spouse is a monthly magazine published in the United States for military dependents. The founder of the magazine, Babette Maxwell, also runs the associated Military Spouse of the Year Awards program. The magazine was first published in September 2004; in 2007, Maxwell sold it to Victory Media, Inc.

== Magazine development ==
Maxwell is the Co-Founder and Creative Officer of Military Spouse magazine. Shortly after September 11, 2001, Maxwell, with no prior industry experience, founded the nation's only print publication for the over 1.1 million military spouses worldwide. In the first six months, Maxwell developed distribution and advertising to launch the premiere issue in September, 2004. The magazine revolutionized how military spouses are perceived in the national public eye and how they are treated by government offices and members of Congress. After the development of the Military Spouse Friendly Employers program by Military Spouse magazine, hiring military spouses became a popular, corporate trend. The magazine covers light-hearted material as well as controversial topics and hard-hitting news features.

In 2007, Military Spouse magazine was acquired by the veteran-owned Victory Media, Inc., based out of Pittsburgh, Pennsylvania, as part of the publisher's military niche market magazine lineup. The magazine has interviewed notable people such as Alma Powell, Senator John McCain, Toby Keith, Carrie Underwood, Catherine Bell, numerous other members of Congress, Department of Defense leadership, Gary Sinise, First Lady Michelle Obama, Jill Biden, former First Lady Laura Bush, and military charity founders.

== Military Spouse of the Year Award development ==
The Military Spouse of the Year Awards program was developed by Maxwell, to provide the only merit-based national award program for US military spouses. It houses five branch winners, one from each military service, and a national winner that represents the entire community nationally for a full-year. The most recent winner, with the assistance of Maxwell and Military Spouse magazine, initiated the Military Spouse Education Initiative for the advancement of education opportunities for military spouses. Of note, in 2011, The Gabby Giffords' Award for Courage and Bravery was added to the program in honor of military spouse Representative Gabby Giffords (D-AZ). Maxwell also added The Legislative Impact Awards to honor members of Congress who act of behalf of military families. In 2011, two were awarded to Representative Sanford Bishop (GA) and Representative Cathy McMorris-Rodgers (WA) for their work founding The Congressional Military Family Caucus.

== Criticisms ==
Military Spouse's parent company Victory Media has been accused of acting as a lead generator for subprime for-profit schools.
