= Reggie Rivers =

American broadcaster and motivational speaker

No. 38
- Position: Running back

Personal information
- Born: February 22, 1968 (age 58); Dayton, Ohio, U.S.
- Listed height: 6 ft 1 in (1.85 m)
- Listed weight: 206 lb (93 kg)

Career information
- High school: Randolph (Universal City, Texas)
- College: Texas State
- NFL draft: 1991: undrafted

Career history
- Denver Broncos (1991–1996)

Career NFL statistics
- Rushing yards: 428
- Rushing average: 3.1
- Rushing touchdowns: 6
- Stats at Pro Football Reference

Reggie Rivers (born February 22, 1968, in Dayton, Ohio) is a professional broadcaster, motivational speaker, author, and former professional football player for the Denver Broncos.

== Sports career ==
Rivers grew up in Ohio with a family background in the U.S. Air Force, later moving to England, Florida, and Greece before settling in the San Antonio, Texas area. Rivers was schooled at Randolph High School in Randolph AFB, Texas, just outside of San Antonio. In his senior year, he rushed for 1,200 yards and earned a scholarship to Southwest Texas State University (now called Texas State University).

Rivers was successful at Texas State and was named to their "Hall of Honor" in 2003. He majored in Journalism at Texas State and worked for the San Antonio Light. From 1991 to 1996, Rivers played running back for the Denver Broncos in the National Football League. 1992 featured his most successful season, where he finished with 731 yards from scrimmage. It was also his most productive rushing year, with 282 yards on 74 carries. Rivers played in every Broncos game during that span, scoring 8 touchdowns. In 1993, Rivers was named the Denver Broncos' special teams Player of the Year. While still a player, Rivers began working for KOA radio; he also wrote a sports column in the Rocky Mountain News.

== After football ==
After retiring from football, Rivers moved to broadcasting full-time, hosting his own talk show on KHOW from 1997 to 2002. Rivers's KHOW show focused more on topical issues than on sports, as did his Rocky Mountain News column (later, Rivers switched to The Denver Post). Since 2006, Rivers has served as KCNC-TV's weekend sports anchor. He currently lives in Denver, Colorado.

== Works ==
Rivers has also written five books:

- The Vance: The Beginning & The End (1994) - an as-told-to autobiography of former Broncos wide receiver Vance Johnson.
- Power Shift (2000) - a novel about a sports reporter and a player who hate each other.
- 4th & Fixed (2004) - a novel about a crime family fixing NFL games.
- My Wife's Boyfriend and Our Feud with the Highlands Ranch Homeowners Association (2006)- a comedic novel about a marriage falling apart in the suburbs.
- The Colony: A Political Tale (2009) - an allegory about foreign policy told through two colonies of ants.
