= Ryan Denney =

American football player (born 1977)

No. 90, 92, 77
- Position: Defensive end

Personal information
- Born: June 15, 1977 (age 49); Denver, Colorado, U.S.
- Listed height: 6 ft 7 in (2.01 m)
- Listed weight: 264 lb (120 kg)

Career information
- High school: Horizon (Thornton, Colorado)
- College: BYU (1997–2002)
- NFL draft: 2002: 2nd round, 61st overall pick

Career history
- Buffalo Bills (2002–2009); Houston Texans (2010)

Awards and highlights
- First-team All-MW (2001)

Career NFL statistics
- Total tackles: 298
- Sacks: 23.5
- Forced fumbles: 6
- Pass deflections: 20
- Receiving yards: 44
- Receiving touchdowns: 2
- Stats at Pro Football Reference

Ryan Craig Denney (born June 15, 1977) is an American former professional football player who was a defensive end in the National Football League (NFL). He played college football for the BYU Cougars and was selected by the Buffalo Bills in the second round of the 2002 NFL draft with the 61st overall pick.

Denney also played for the Houston Texans.

== Early life ==
Denney attended Horizon High School (Thornton, Colorado) and won three varsity letters in football and two in basketball. In football, as a senior, he was named the Denver Post Defensive Player of the Year, won All-Conference honors as both an offensive lineman and as a defensive lineman, and won All-State honors as a defensive lineman. Denney graduated from Horizon High School in 1995. He served as a Mormon missionary for two years in Argentina before playing for Brigham Young University in college.

== College career ==
Denney was two-year starter at BYU and finished his career with 156 tackles (92 solos), 16 quarterback sacks, 40 stops behind the line of scrimmage and 13 pass deflections. As a senior, was a Second-team All-America selection by The NFL Draft Report, earning fourth-team honors from The Sporting News He was an Academic All-American and a First-team All-Mountain West Conference selection. He started all year at right defensive end and recorded 68 tackles (45 solos) as he led the team with seven sacks and 19 tackles for losses and intercepted a pass and ranked second on the squad with eight pass deflections. In 2000, he earned Academic All-Mountain West Conference honors. He missed the 1996–97 season while serving on a mission in Buenos Aires, Argentina.

== Professional career ==
=== Buffalo Bills ===
Ryan had a spectacular game against the Miami Dolphins on September 17, 2006, when he recorded 3 sacks on Miami quarterback, Daunte Culpepper in just the first half of the game.

On August 17, 2007, during the opening kickoff of a preseason game against the Atlanta Falcons, Denney suffered a broken bone in his foot. He was one of three Bills position players to play in every year since 2003.

At the end of the 2007 NFL season he had played in the league for six years.

He caught a touchdown in the Bills season opener vs Seattle on September 7, 2008 from a Brian Moorman pass on a fake field goal and one more vs New Orleans on September 27, 2009, again from a Moorman pass on a fake field goal.

On February 27, 2010, the Buffalo Bills announced that they would not be offering Ryan Denney a contract which rendered him an unrestricted free agent.

=== Houston Texans ===
On September 15, 2010, the Houston Texans announced they had signed Denney to an undisclosed contract. On October 7, 2010, the Texans waived Denney.

== NFL career statistics ==
Legend
**Bold**	Career high

Year	Team	Games		Tackles					Interceptions					Fumbles			
Year	Team	GP	GS	Cmb	Solo	Ast	Sck	TFL	Int	Yds	TD	Lng	PD	FF	FR	Yds	TD
2002	BUF	8	0	9	6	3	0.0	0	0	0	0	0	0	0	0	0	0
2003	BUF	**16**	**13**	43	27	16	3.5	5	0	0	0	0	3	1	0	0	0
2004	BUF	**16**	5	35	15	**20**	3.0	2	0	0	0	0	2	1	0	0	0
2005	BUF	**16**	0	45	28	17	4.0	7	0	0	0	0	3	0	**1**	0	0
2006	BUF	**16**	0	54	38	16	**6.0**	7	0	0	0	0	5	**2**	**1**	0	0
2007	BUF	7	2	27	21	6	1.0	3	0	0	0	0	0	0	**1**	0	0
2008	BUF	**16**	11	**58**	**40**	18	4.0	**9**	0	0	0	0	**7**	1	0	0	0
2009	BUF	**16**	0	27	16	11	2.0	1	0	0	0	0	0	1	0	0	0
2010	HOU	2	0	0	0	0	0.0	0	0	0	0	0	0	0	0	0	0
		113	31	298	191	107	23.5	34	0	0	0	0	20	6	3	0	0

== Family ==
Ryan is the brother of Miami Dolphins long snapper John Denney, who also wears number 92 on his jersey. Ryan and his wife, Laura have four daughters, Kyle, Kate, Alli and Samantha, and two sons, Tyler and Will. He is also the brother-in-law of Doug Jolley, former NFL tight end for the New York Jets.
