= Doug Jolley =

American football player (born 1979)

No. 88, 86
- Position: Tight end

Personal information
- Born: January 2, 1979 (age 47); Sandy, Utah, U.S.
- Listed height: 6 ft 4 in (1.93 m)
- Listed weight: 250 lb (113 kg)

Career information
- High school: Dixie (St. George, Utah)
- College: BYU
- NFL draft: 2002: 2nd round, 55th overall pick

Career history
- Oakland Raiders (2002–2004); New York Jets (2005); Tampa Bay Buccaneers (2006)

Awards and highlights
- First-team All-MW (2001)

Career NFL statistics
- Receptions: 120
- Receiving yards: 1,303
- Receiving touchdowns: 6
- Stats at Pro Football Reference

Doug Jolley (born January 2, 1979) is an American former professional football player who was a tight end in the National Football League (NFL). He played college football for the BYU Cougars. Jolley was selected by the Oakland Raiders in 2002, where he played three years. He also played single seasons for the New York Jets and Tampa Bay Buccaneers.

== Career ==
Jolley attended Brigham Young University, where he was a first-team All-Mountain West selection in 2001.

He was selected 55th overall by the Oakland Raiders in the second round of the 2002 NFL Draft, and was a starter on the Raiders' Super Bowl team that year. He caught a touchdown pass in the AFC Championship Game, and hauled five more catches in the Super Bowl. He was the first St. George native ever to play in a Super Bowl game.

In 2005, Jolley was dealt from the Raiders to the Jets, with a 2nd round pick and two 6th round picks, for a 1st and 7th round pick. After a year in New York, he was traded from the Jets to Tampa Bay for a sixth round draft pick.

== Personal life ==
Jolley played high school football at Dixie High School in St. George. His father, Gordon Jolley, played for the Detroit Lions and the Seattle Seahawks.

Jolley is married to the former Mary Beesley, with whom he has four children, Luke, Rachel, Henry and Hazel. He is also the brother-in-law of former Buffalo Bills defensive end Ryan Denney, a friend with whom he played football with at BYU, their wives are sisters. While pursuing a master's degree in economics in 2015 at Stanford, he volunteered as a coach for their Cardinal Football team. Since leaving the NFL, Jolley has taught mathematics in various schools throughout California, Utah, Arizona, and Texas, he is currently working at Vista Verde K-8 school.
