= 2001 Las Vegas Bowl =

2001 SEGA Sports Las Vegas Bowl
- 10th Las Vegas Bowl
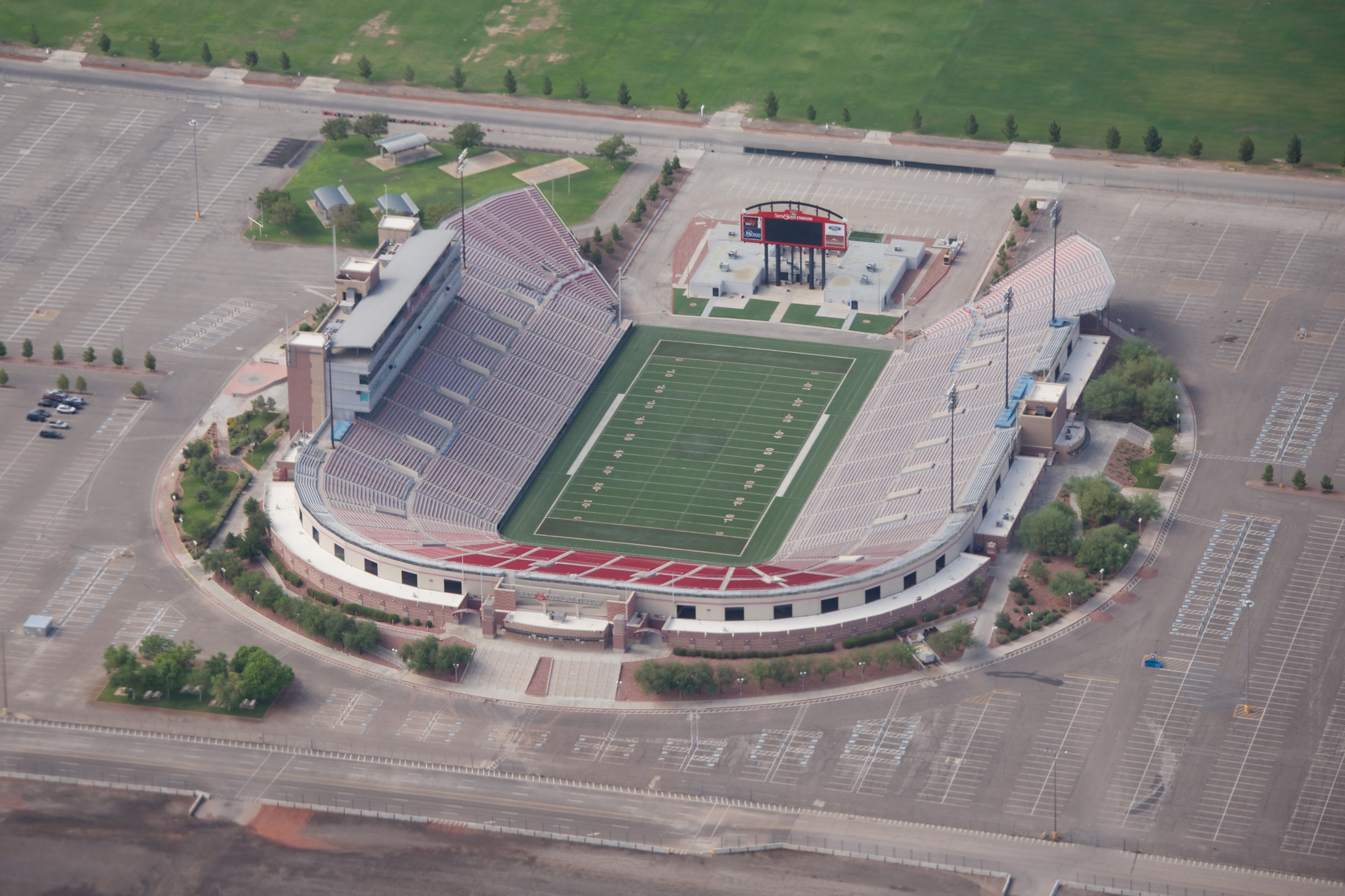
- Sam Boyd Stadium in Whitney, Nevada, hosted the Las Vegas Bowl.
Utah Utes	USC Trojans
(7–4)	(6–5)
Mountain West	Pac-10
10	6
Head coach: Ron McBride	Head coach: Pete Carroll
	1	2	3	4	Total
Utah	7	3	0	0	10
USC	0	0	6	0	6
- Date: December 25, 2001
- Season: 2001
- Stadium: Sam Boyd Stadium
- Location: Whitney, Nevada
- Referee: Jack Childress (ACC)
- Attendance: 30,894
- Payout: US$800,000 per team

United States TV coverage
- Network: ABC
- Announcers: Brent Musburger, Gary Danielson, Jack Arute

The 2001 Las Vegas Bowl was the 10th edition of the annual college football bowl game. It featured the Utah Utes and the USC Trojans.

== Game summary ==
The game was dominated by defense. Utah opened the scoring on a 3-yard touchdown run by Adam Tate, leading 7–0. They increased their lead to 10–0 in the second quarter, with a 26-yard field goal from Ryan Kaneshiro. That would be their final score of the game. In the third quarter, USC's Sunny Byrd scored a touchdown from 2 yards out, but the extra point missed leaving the score 10–6. Utah held on to win the game over USC.
