= Lackland Independent School District =

School district in Texas

Lackland Independent School District is a public independent school district (ISD) based in Bexar County, Texas, United States.

The district's boundaries are coterminous with Lackland Air Force Base (AFB), and it only draws students who reside within the installation. However, it answers to the Texas Education Agency, not the Department of Defense Education Activity, and functions much like any other Texas school district. Additionally, children of Lackland AFB members residing off base do not have automatic rights to attend Lackland ISD but can be accepted on a transfer basis.

Lackland ISD is one of three school districts in the state whose boundaries are coterminous with a military installation; the other two (also in the San Antonio area) are Randolph Field ISD and Fort Sam Houston ISD.

In 2009, the school district was rated "recognized" by the Texas Education Agency.

== Schools ==
- Stacey Junior/Senior High School (Grades 6–12)
  - National Blue Ribbon School in 1994-96
- Lackland Elementary (Grades PK-5)
  - National Blue Ribbon School in 1998-99
