= 2001 Liberty Bowl =

2001 AXA Liberty Bowl
- 43rd Liberty Bowl
Louisville Cardinals	BYU Cougars
(10–2)	(12–1)
C-USA	Mountain West
28	10
Head coach: John L. Smith	Head coach: Gary Crowton
AP / Coaches / BCS; 23 / 22 / NR	AP / Coaches / BCS; 19 / 17 / NR
	1	2	3	4	Total
Louisville	7	7	7	7	28
BYU	0	7	3	0	10
- Date: December 31, 2001
- Season: 2001
- Stadium: Liberty Bowl Memorial Stadium
- Location: Memphis, Tennessee
- MVP: Dave Ragone (QB, Louisville)
- Referee: Jeff Roberson (Sun Belt)
- Attendance: 58,968

United States TV coverage
- Network: ESPN
- Announcers: Mark Jones, Chris Spielman, and Holly Rowe

The 2001 AXA Liberty Bowl was a college football postseason bowl game played on December 31, 2001, at Liberty Bowl Memorial Stadium in Memphis, Tennessee. The 43rd edition of the Liberty Bowl featured the Louisville Cardinals and the BYU Cougars. The game was sponsored by the Axa Equitable Life Insurance Company and was branded as the AXA Liberty Bowl. Louisville won the game, 28–10.
