= Cliff Russell =

American football player (born 1979)

No. 83, 88, 10
- Position: Wide receiver

Personal information
- Born: February 8, 1979 (age 47); Fayetteville, North Carolina, U.S.
- Listed height: 5 ft 11 in (1.80 m)
- Listed weight: 190 lb (86 kg)

Career information
- High school: James Campbell (Ewa Beach, Hawaii)
- College: Utah
- NFL draft: 2002: 3rd round, 87th overall pick

Career history
- Washington Redskins (2002–2003); Cincinnati Bengals (2004); Miami Dolphins (2005–2006); Detroit Lions (2007)*; Denver Broncos (2008)
- * Offseason or practice squad member only

Awards and highlights
- Second-team All-MW (2001)

Career NFL statistics
- Receptions: 5
- Receiving yards: 45
- Return yards: 916
- Stats at Pro Football Reference

Clifford Antonio Russell (born February 8, 1979) is an American former professional football player who was a wide receiver in the National Football League (NFL). He was waived by the Denver Broncos on February 11, 2009.

Russell was selected by the Washington Redskins in the third round of the 2002 NFL draft. Russell was also a member of the Cincinnati Bengals, Miami Dolphins, and Detroit Lions. He played college football for the Utah Utes.

Following his NFL career, he founded and has operated Ripped Performance, a fitness center in Ashburn, Virginia.
