= Gary Crowton =

American football coach (born 1957)

Biographical details
- Born: June 14, 1957 (age 69); Orem, Utah, U.S.

Coaching career (HC unless noted)
- 1982: BYU (GA)
- 1983: Snow (DB)
- 1984–1986: Snow (OC)
- 1987: Western Illinois (OC)
- 1988–1990: New Hampshire (OC)
- 1991–1993: Boston College (QB)
- 1994: Georgia Tech (co-OC)
- 1995: Louisiana Tech (OC)
- 1996–1998: Louisiana Tech
- 1999–2000: Chicago Bears (OC)
- 2001–2004: BYU
- 2005–2006: Oregon (OC)
- 2007–2010: LSU (OC)
- 2011: Maryland (OC)
- 2012–2013: Winnipeg Blue Bombers (OC)
- 2014–2015: Southern Utah (OC)
- 2015: Oregon State (offensive consultant)
- 2016–2017: Stephen F. Austin (OC)
- 2018–2021: Pine View HS (UT) (OC)

Head coaching record
- Overall: 47–36

Accomplishments and honors

Championships
- 1 Mountain West (2001)

Awards
- MW Coach of the Year (2001)

David Gary Crowton (born June 14, 1957) is an American football coach. He served as the head football coach at Louisiana Tech University from 1996 to 1998 and at Brigham Young University (BYU) from 2001 to 2004, compiling a career college football coaching record of 47–36.

Crowton has also served as offensive coordinator at the University of Maryland, the University of Oregon, for the Chicago Bears in the National Football League (NFL), and at Louisiana State University (LSU). He was the offensive coordinator for the 2007 LSU Tigers football team, which won the 2008 BCS National Championship Game and a consensus national championship.

During his time at Oregon, Crowton was a 2005 finalist for the Broyles Award, given annually to the nation's top college football assistant coach. He is known for his aggressive offensive style, including the "razzle dazzle" scheme he employed in Chicago. He was nicknamed "The Wizard" by the LSU players, after he achieved a remarkable record of scoring at least 30 points in 25 games out of 39, with an overall mark of 25–10.

== Coaching career ==
Crowton succeeded longtime coach LaVell Edwards as head coach of BYU in 2001. In his first season, he led the Cougars to a 12–2 record, their most wins since going 14–1 in 1996. After only winning 14 more games in the next three years, Crowton was forced to resign after the 2004 season. By comparison, Edwards had suffered only two non-winning seasons in 29 years.

In 2018, Crowton was hired as the offensive coordinator at Pine View High School in St. George, Utah.

== Education and family ==
Crowton graduated from Orem High School in 1975 and went on to earn a B.S. in physical education from Brigham Young University in 1983. He and his wife, Maren, have four daughters and three sons. Crowton made an appearance in the Mormon pop culture film The R.M.

== Head coaching record ==
Year	Team	Overall	Conference	Standing	Bowl/playoffs	Coaches^{#}	AP^{°}
Louisiana Tech Bulldogs (NCAA Division I-A independent) (1996–1998)
1996	Louisiana Tech	6–5					
1997	Louisiana Tech	9–2					
1998	Louisiana Tech	6–6					
Louisiana Tech:		21–13					
BYU Cougars (Mountain West Conference) (2001–2004)
2001	BYU	12–2	7–0	1st	L Liberty	24	25
2002	BYU	5–7	2–5	5th			
2003	BYU	4–8	3–4	6th			
2004	BYU	5–6	4–3	3rd			
BYU:		26–23	16–12				
Total:		47–36					
National championship Conference title Conference division title or championship game berth
^{#}Rankings from final Coaches Poll.; ^{°}Rankings from final AP Poll.
