= Wyoming Cowboys football statistical leaders =

The Wyoming Cowboys football statistical leaders are individual statistical leaders of the Wyoming Cowboys football program in various categories, including passing, rushing, receiving, total offense, defensive stats, and kicking. Within those areas, the lists identify single-game, single-season, and career leaders. The Cowboys represent the University of Wyoming in the NCAA Division I FBS Mountain West Conference (MW).

Although Wyoming began competing in intercollegiate football in 1892, the school's official record book considers the "modern era" to have begun in 1951. Records from before this year are often incomplete and inconsistent, and they are generally not included in these lists.

These lists are dominated by more recent players for several reasons:

- Since 1951, seasons have increased from 10 games to 11 and then 12 games in length.
- The NCAA didn't allow freshmen to play varsity football until 1972 (with the exception of the World War II years), limiting players prior to 1972 to three-year careers.
- Bowl games only began counting toward single-season and career statistics in 2002. The Cowboys have played in seven bowl games since this decision, giving many recent players an extra game to accumulate statistics.
- The MW has held a conference championship game since 2013. The Cowboys played in this game in 2016, giving players in that season one more game to accumulate statistics.
- Due to COVID-19 issues, the NCAA ruled that the 2020 season would not count against the athletic eligibility of any football player, giving everyone who played in that season the opportunity for five years of eligibility instead of the normal four.

These lists are updated through the 2025 season.

== Passing ==
=== Passing yards ===
Career
Rk	Player	Yards	Years
1	Casey Bramlet	9,684	2000 2001 2002 2003
2	Brett Smith	8,834	2011 2012 2013
3	Tom Corontzos	7,945	1988 1989 1990 1991
4	Jay Stoner	7,674	1997 1998 1999 2000
5	Josh Wallwork	6,453	1995 1996
6	Joe Hughes	6,078	1992 1993
7	Corey Bramlet	5,149	2002 2003 2004 2005
8	Josh Allen	5,066	2015 2016 2017
9	Scott Runyan	4,817	1984 1985 1986 1987
10	Craig Burnett	4,373	1986 1987

Single season
Rk	Player	Yards	Year
1	Josh Wallwork	4,090	1996
2	Brett Smith	3,375	2013
3	Joe Hughes	3,372	1993
4	Casey Bramlet	3,290	2002
5	Josh Allen	3,203	2016
6	Craig Burnett	3,131	1987
7	Casey Bramlet	3,069	2001
8	Casey Bramlet	3,037	2003
9	Tom Corontzos	2,956	1990
10	Tom Corontzos	2,868	1991

Single game
Rk	Player	Yards	Year	Opponent
1	Brett Smith	498	2013	Hawaii
2	Josh Wallwork	485	1996	Idaho
3	Josh Wallwork	453	1996	Air Force
	Casey Bramlet	453	2002	UNLV
5	Craig Burnett	441	1987	Oklahoma State
6	John Gustin	427	1994	New Mexico
7	Joe Hughes	422	1993	UTEP
	Casey Bramlet	422	2001	Utah State
9	Tom Corontzos	421	1990	San Diego State
10	Brett Smith	412	2012	UNLV

=== Passing touchdowns ===
Career
Rk	Player	TDs	Years
1	Brett Smith	76	2011 2012 2013
2	Casey Bramlet	56	2000 2001 2002 2003
3	Josh Wallwork	54	1995 1996
4	Tom Corontzos	48	1988 1989 1990 1991
5	Josh Allen	44	2015 2016 2017
6	Joe Hughes	38	1992 1993
7	Jay Stoner	37	1997 1998 1999 2000
8	Scott Runyan	36	1984 1985 1986 1987
9	Craig Burnett	34	1986 1987
10	Andrew Peasley	30	2022 2023

Single season
Rk	Player	TDs	Year
1	Josh Wallwork	33	1996
2	Brett Smith	29	2013
3	Josh Allen	28	2016
4	Brett Smith	27	2012
5	Joe Hughes	24	1993
	Casey Bramlet	24	2002
7	Casey Bramlet	22	2003
8	Craig Burnett	21	1987

Single game
Rk	Player	TDs	Year	Opponent
1	Brett Smith	7	2013	Hawaii

== Rushing ==
=== Rushing yards ===
Career
Rk	Player	Yards	Years
1	Brian Hill	4,287	2014 2015 2016
2	Xazavian Valladay	3,274	2018 2019 2020 2021
3	Devin Moore	2,963	2005 2006 2007 2008
4	Ryan Christopherson	2,906	1991 1992 1993 1994
5	Wynel Seldon	2,672	2005 2006 2007 2008
6	Marques Brigham	2,605	1995 1996 1997 1998
7	Shaun Wick	2,533	2012 2013 2014 2015 2016
8	Gerald Abraham	2,278	1984 1985 1986 1987
9	Derek Armah	2,190	2000 2001 2002 2003
10	Kevin Lowe	2,188	1981 1982 1983 1984

Single season
Rk	Player	Yards	Year
1	Brian Hill	1,860	2016
2	Brian Hill	1,631	2015
3	Ryan Christopherson	1,455	1994
4	Nico Evans	1,325	2018
5	Gerald Abraham	1,305	1987
6	Devin Moore	1,301	2008
7	Xazavian Valladay	1,265	2019
8	Myron Hardeman	1,165	1977
9	Dabby Dawson	1,119	1988
10	Marques Brigham	1,114	1998

Single game
Rk	Player	Yards	Year	Opponent
1	Kevin Lowe	302	1984	South Dakota State
2	Brian Hill	289	2016	Nevada
3	Brian Hill	281	2014	Fresno State
4	Ryan Christopherson	244	1994	UTEP
5	Brian Hill	242	2015	Eastern Michigan
6	Devin Moore	234	2008	San Diego State
	Shaun Wick	234	2013	San Jose State
8	Brian Hill	232	2015	UNLV
9	Myron Hardeman	230	1978	San Diego State
10	Dave Evans	228	1984	Colorado State

=== Rushing touchdowns ===
Career
Rk	Player	TDs	Years
1	Brian Hill	35	2014 2015 2016
2	Eddie Talboom	34	1948 1949 1950
3	Phil Davis	30	1978 1979 1980 1981
4	Alvester Alexander	27	2009 2010 2011
5	Walt Goffigan	26	1980 1981 1982 1983
	Kevin Lowe	26	1981 1982 1983 1984
7	Marques Brigham	25	1995 1996 1997 1998
8	Wynel Seldon	22	2005 2006 2007 2008
9	Shaun Wick	21	2012 2013 2014 2015 2016
10	Brett Smith	20	2011 2012 2013

Single season
Rk	Player	TDs	Year
1	Brian Hill	22	2016
2	Alvester Alexander	14	2010
3	Jim Crawford	13	1956
	Gerald Abraham	13	1987
5	Dwight Driver	11	1992

Single game
Rk	Player	TDs	Year	Opponent
1	Alvester Alexander	5	2010	Colorado State

== Receiving ==
=== Receptions ===
Career
Rk	Player	Rec	Years
1	Marcus Harris	259	1993 1994 1995 1996
2	Jovon Bouknight	250	2002 2003 2004 2005
3	Ryan Yarborough	239	1990 1991 1992 1993
4	Ryan McGuffey	231	2000 2001 2002 2003
5	Dominic Rufran	203	2011 2012 2013 2014
6	Malcom Floyd	186	2000 2001 2002 2003
7	Wendell Montgomery	181	1996 1997 1998 1999
8	Tanner Gentry	180	2013 2014 2015 2016
9	Michael Ford	156	2004 2005 2006 2007
10	David Leonard	153	2007 2008 2009 2010

Single season
Rk	Player	Rec	Year
1	Marcus Harris	109	1996
2	Ryan Yarborough	86	1992
3	Marcus Harris	78	1995
4	Jovon Bouknight	77	2005
5	Ryan Yarborough	75	1993
6	Tanner Gentry	72	2016
7	Marcus Harris	71	1994

Single game
Rk	Player	Rec	Year	Opponent
1	Marcus Harris	16	1996	Iowa State
	Marcus Harris	16	1996	Colorado State
3	Brent Tillman	15	1994	San Diego State
	Ryan McGuffey	15	2001	UNLV
5	Jovon Bouknight	14	2005	San Diego State
	Malcom Floyd	14	2003	San Diego State
7	Ryan Yarborough	13	1992	Air Force
	Ryan Yarborough	13	1992	BYU
	Marcus Harris	13	1996	Air Force
	Ryan McGuffey	13	2003	Kansas
	David Leonard	13	2009	Florida Atlantic

=== Receiving yards ===
Career
Rk	Player	Yards	Years
1	Marcus Harris	4,518	1993 1994 1995 1996
2	Ryan Yarborough	4,446	1990 1991 1992 1993
3	Jovon Bouknight	3,626	2002 2003 2004 2005
4	Wendell Montgomery	2,883	1996 1997 1998 1999
5	Tanner Gentry	2,815	2013 2014 2015 2016
6	Ryan McGuffey	2,679	2000 2001 2002 2003
7	Dominic Rufran	2,487	2011 2012 2013 2014
8	Malcom Floyd	2,411	2000 2001 2002 2003
9	Steve Martinez	2,043	1979 1980 1981 1982
10	Robert Herron	2,030	2010 2011 2012 2013

Single season
Rk	Player	Yards	Year
1	Marcus Harris	1,650	1996
2	Ryan Yarborough	1,584	1993
3	Marcus Harris	1,431	1994
4	Marcus Harris	1,423	1995
5	Ryan Yarborough	1,351	1992
6	Tanner Gentry	1,326	2016
7	Jovon Bouknight	1,116	2005
8	Ryan Yarborough	1,081	1991
9	Jovon Bouknight	1,075	2004
10	Shawn Wiggins	1,018	1990

Single game
Rk	Player	Yards	Year	Opponent
1	Marcus Harris	260	1994	Fresno State
2	James Loving	247	1987	Houston
3	Ryan Yarborough	241	1993	Air Force
4	Scottie Vines	237	2002	UNLV
5	Marcus Harris	223	1996	Iowa State
6	Chris McNeill	219	2012	Idaho
7	Ryan Yarborough	218	1991	San Diego State
8	Ryan Yarborough	217	1993	San Diego State
9	Ryan Yarborough	213	1993	UTEP
10	Ryan Yarborough	205	1991	BYU

=== Receiving touchdowns ===
Career
Rk	Player	TDs	Years
1	Ryan Yarborough	42	1990 1991 1992 1993
2	Marcus Harris	38	1993 1994 1995 1996
3	Jovon Bouknight	29	2002 2003 2004 2005
4	Robert Herron	20	2010 2011 2012 2013
	Tanner Gentry	20	2013 2014 2015 2016
6	Anthony Sargent	19	1986 1987
7	Dominic Rufran	15	2011 2012 2013 2014
8	Dewey McConnell	14	1948 1949 1950 1951
	Gene Huey	14	1965 1966 1967 1968
	Malcom Floyd	14	2000 2001 2002 2003
	Jake Maulhardt	14	2013 2014 2015 2016

Single season
Rk	Player	TDs	Year
1	Ryan Yarborough	16	1993
2	Marcus Harris	14	1995
	Tanner Gentry	14	2016
4	Ryan Yarborough	13	1991
	Marcus Harris	13	1996
6	Ryan Yarborough	12	1992
	Jovon Bouknight	12	2005
	Isaiah Neyor	12	2021
9	Marcus Harris	11	1994

Single game
Rk	Player	TDs	Year	Opponent
1	Marcus Harris	4	1995	Oklahoma State
	Robert Herron	4	2013	Hawaii

== Total offense ==
Total offense is the sum of passing and rushing statistics. It does not include receiving or returns.Total offense is the sum of passing and rushing statistics. It does not include receiving or returns.

=== Total offense yards ===
Career
Rk	Player	Yards	Years
1	Brett Smith	10,365	2011 2012 2013
2	Casey Bramlet	9,575	2000 2001 2002 2003
3	Tom Corontzos	7,642	1988 1989 1990 1991
4	Jay Stoner	7,523	1997 1998 1999 2000
5	Josh Wallwork	6,753	1995 1996
6	Joe Hughes	6,249	1992 1993
7	Phil Davis	5,951	1978 1979 1980 1981
8	Josh Allen	5,686	2015 2016 2017
9	Corey Bramlet	5,507	2002 2003 2004 2005
10	Scott Runyan	5,490	1984 1985 1986 1987

Single season
Rk	Player	Yards	Year
1	Josh Wallwork	4,209	1996
2	Brett Smith	3,948	2013
3	Josh Allen	3,715	2016
4	Joe Hughes	3,406	1993
5	Brett Smith	3,332	2011
6	Casey Bramlet	3,325	2002
7	Randy Welniak	3,206	1988
8	Craig Burnett	3,086	1987
9	Brett Smith	3,085	2012
10	Casey Bramlet	3,048	2001

Single game
Rk	Player	Yards	Year	Opponent
1	Brett Smith	640	2013	Hawaii
2	Josh Wallwork	482	1996	Idaho
3	Josh Wallwork	476	1996	Air Force
4	Randy Welniak	467	1988	Air Force
5	Joe Hughes	447	1993	UTEP
6	Casey Bramlet	442	2002	UNLV
7	Craig Burnett	439	1987	Oklahoma State
	Tom Corontzos	439	1990	San Diego State
9	Casey Bramlet	433	2001	Utah State
10	John Gustin	419	1994	San Diego State

=== Touchdowns responsible for ===
"Touchdowns responsible for" is the NCAA's official term for combined passing and rushing touchdowns.

Career
Rk	Player	TDs	Years
1	Brett Smith	97	2011 2012 2013
2	Casey Bramlet	70	2000 2001 2002 2003
3	Josh Wallwork	60	1995 1996
4	Josh Allen	56	2015 2016 2017
5	Tom Corontzos	54	1988 1989 1990 1991

Single season
Rk	Player	TDs	Year
1	Randy Welniak	35	1988
	Josh Wallwork	35	1996
	Josh Allen	35	2016
4	Brett Smith	33	2012
	Brett Smith	33	2013
6	Brett Smith	30	2011
7	Casey Bramlet	29	2002
8	Joe Hughes	28	1993

Single game
Rk	Player	TDs	Year	Opponent
1	Brett Smith	8	2013	Hawaii

== Defense ==
=== Interceptions ===
Career
Rk	Player	Ints	Years
1	Brian Lee	17	1994 1995 1996 1997
2	Paul Wallace	14	1989 1990 1991 1992
3	Andrew Wingard	10	2015 2016 2017 2018
	Mark Thomas	10	1983 1984 1985 1986
	Daniel Prevo	10	1963 1964 1965
	Logan Wilson	10	2016 2017 2018 2019
7	Marcus Epps	9	2015 2016 2017 2018
	Kevin McClain	9	1974 1975 1976
	Michael Davis	9	1980 1981
	Steve McMillon	9	1984 1985 1986 1987 1988
	Julius Stinson	9	2004 2005 2006 2007
	Tashaun Gipson	9	2008 2009 2010 2011

Single season
Rk	Player	Ints	Year
1	Brian Lee	8	1996
	Brian Lee	8	1997
3	Dick Speights	6	1966
	Paul Toscano	6	1966
	Bruce Small	6	1980
	Michael Davis	6	1980
	Mark Thomas	6	1986

Single game
Rk	Player	Ints	Year	Opponent
1	Selmer Pederson	3	1950	Denver
	Brian Lee	3	1996	SMU
	Brian Lee	3	1997	Montana
	Shamiel Gary	3	2009	Weber State

=== Tackles ===
Career
Rk	Player	Tackles	Years
1	Galand Thaxton	467	1984 1985 1986 1987
2	Andrew Wingard	454	2015 2016 2017 2018
3	Jim Talich	440	1994 1995 1996 1997
4	Logan Wilson	418	2016 2017 2018 2019
5	John Salley	379	1979 1980 1981 1982
6	Chris Prosinski	373	2007 2008 2009 2010
7	Gabe Knapton	368	2008 2009 2010 2011
8	Easton Gibbs	361	2020 2021 2022 2023
9	Ken Fantetti	352	1975 1976 1977 1978
10	Lucas Wacha	344	2013 2014 2015 2016

Single season
Rk	Player	Tackles	Year
1	Galand Thaxton	158	1986
2	John Salley	143	1982
	Galand Thaxton	143	1987
4	Chad Muma	142	2021
5	Chris Prosinski	140	2009
6	Bruce Mowry	139	1984
7	Jim Talich	138	1996
8	Brian Brown	136	1997
9	Al Duyn	134	1973
	Jordan Stanton	134	2013

Single game
Rk	Player	Tackles	Year	Opponent
1	Brian Hendricks	23	2009	Air Force
2	Frank Erzinger	21	1972	New Mexico
3	Paul Nunu	20	1976	New Mexico
	Marqueston Huff	20	2013	Utah State
5	Daniel Gleason	19	1968	BYU

=== Sacks ===
Career
Rk	Player	Sacks	Years
1	Mitch Donahue	49.0	1987 1988 1989 1990
2	Jeff Knapton	30.0	1984 1985 1986 1987
	Pat Rabold	30.0	1985 1986 1987 1988
4	Patrick Chukwurah	27.0	1997 1998 1999 2000
5	Thomas Williams	24.0	1989 1990 1991 1992 1993
	John Fletcher	24.0	2006 2007 2008 2009
7	David Edeen	23.0	1986 1987 1988
	Doug Rigby	23.0	1988 1989 1990 1991
9	Eddie Yarbrough	21.5	2012 2013 2014 2015
10	Craig Schlichting	19.0	1986 1987 1988 1989
	Brent Schieffer	19.0	1991 1992 1993 1994

Single season
Rk	Player	Sacks	Year
1	Mitch Donahue	22.0	1990
2	Jeff Knapton	19.0	1987
3	Pat Rabold	16.0	1988
4	Pat Rabold	14.0	1987
5	Craig Schlichting	11.0	1988
	David Edeen	11.0	1988
	Thomas Williams	11.0	1990
	Brent Schieffer	11.0	1993
9	John Fletcher	10.5	2007

Single game
Rk	Player	Sacks	Year	Opponent
1	David Edeen	5.0	1988	BYU
2	Korey Jones	4.0	2001	Texas State
3	John Fletcher	3.5	2007	UNLV
	Josh Biezuns	3.5	2010	Colorado State

== Kicking ==
=== Field goals made ===
Career
Rk	Player	FGs	Years
1	John Hoyland	73	2020 2021 2022 2023 2024
2	Cooper Rothe	59	2016 2017 2018 2019
3	Deric Yaussi	39	2003 2004 2005
4	Stuart Williams	23	2011 2012 2013 2014
5	Jarvis Wallum	20	2001
	Ian Watts	20	2009 2010

Single season
Rk	Player	FGs	Year
1	John Hoyland	22	2022
2	Cory Wedel	20	1996
	J. D. Wallum	20	2001

Single game
Rk	Player	FGs	Year	Opponent
1	Sean Fleming	6	1990	Arkansas State
	Cory Wedel	6	1996	Idaho
