= 2002 Colorado State Rams football team =

American college football season

2002 Colorado State Rams football
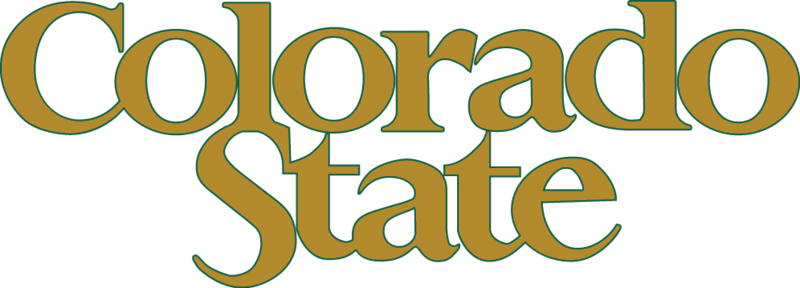

MW champion

Liberty Bowl, L 3–17 vs. TCU
- Conference: Mountain West Conference
- Record: 10–4 (6–1 MW)
- Head coach: Sonny Lubick (10th season)
- Co-offensive coordinators: John Benton (2nd season); Dan Hammerschmidt (2nd season)
- Defensive coordinator: Larry Kerr (10th season)
- Home stadium: Hughes Stadium

2002 Mountain West Conference football standings
	Conf.			Overall
Team	W		L	W		L
Colorado State $	6	–	1	10	–	4
New Mexico	5	–	2	7	–	7
Air Force	4	–	3	8	–	5
San Diego State	4	–	3	4	–	9
Utah	3	–	4	5	–	6
UNLV	3	–	4	5	–	7
BYU	2	–	5	5	–	7
Wyoming	1	–	6	2	–	10
$ – Conference champion; Rankings from AP Poll

The 2002 Colorado State Rams football team represented Colorado State University during the 2002 NCAA Division I-A football season. They played their home games at Hughes Stadium in Fort Collins, Colorado and were led by head coach Sonny Lubick.

== Schedule ==
Date	Time	Opponent	Rank	Site	TV	Result	Attendance
August 22	5:30 pm	at Virginia*		Scott Stadium; Charlottesville, VA (Jim Thorpe Classic)	FSN	W 35–29	57,120
August 31	11:00 am	vs. No. 7 Colorado*		Invesco Field at Mile High; Denver, CO (Rocky Mountain Showdown)	ESPN2	W 19–14	75,531
September 7	8:15 pm	at UCLA*	No. 19	Rose Bowl; Pasadena, CA	FSN	L 19–30	58,078
September 14	7:30 pm	Louisville*	No. 24	Hughes Stadium; Fort Collins, CO	ESPN2	W 36–33	31,607
September 28	2:00 pm	at Nevada*	No. 25	Mackay Stadium; Reno, NV		W 32–28	19,292
October 4	6:00 pm	at Fresno State*	No. 25	Bulldog Stadium; Fresno, CA	ESPN	L 30–32	38,336
October 12	1:00 pm	Wyoming		Hughes Stadium; Fort Collins, CO (Border War)	ESPN Plus	W 44–36	32,151
October 19	1:00 pm	Utah		Rice–Eccles Stadium; Salt Lake City, UT	ESPN Plus	W 28–20	34,374
October 24	8:00 pm	BYU		Hughes Stadium; Fort Collins, CO	ESPN2	W 37–10	29,457
October 31	5:30 pm	at Air Force	No. 24	Falcon Stadium; Colorado Springs, CO	ESPN	W 31–12	39,063
November 16	5:00 pm	at San Diego State	No. 21	Qualcomm Stadium; San Diego, CA	SPW	W 49–21	21,714
November 23	4:00 pm	New Mexico	No. 20	Hughes Stadium; Fort Collins, CO	SPW	W 22–14	30,215
November 30	1:00 pm	UNLV	No. 16	Hughes Stadium; Fort Collins, CO	SPW	L 33–36	28,877
December 31	1:30 pm	vs. TCU*	No. 23	Liberty Bowl Memorial Stadium; Memphis, TN (Liberty Bowl)	ESPN	L 3–17	55,207
*Non-conference game; Rankings from AP Poll released prior to the game; All times are in Mountain time

== Roster ==
2002 Colorado State Rams football team roster
Players
Coaches
Offense

Pos.	#	Name	Class
TE	88	Brandon Alconcel	Fr
WR	4	David Anderson	Fr
C	77	Albert Bimper	Fr
OL	63	Mike Brisiel	Fr
RB	28	Henri Childs	Sr
TE	81	Joel Dreessen	So
OL	70	Mark Dreyer	Jr
OL	74	Erik Pears	So
OL	69	Morgan Pears	So
RB	32	Cecil Sapp	Sr
QB	11	Bradlee Van Pelt	Jr

Defense

Pos.	#	Name	Class
DE	93	Chris Kiffin	So
DB	20	Rhett Nelson	Sr
DT	95	Bryan Save	Jr
DB	37	David Vickers	Sr
DE	96	Andre Sommersell	Jr
DE	36	Mike Vomhof	So
LB	9	Adam Wade	Sr
DB	18	Lenzie Williams	Jr
LB	50	Drew Wood	Jr
DB	5	Dexter Wynn	Jr

Special teams

Pos.	#	Name	Class

Head coach

- Sonny Lubick

Coordinators/assistant coaches

- Brian Schneider STC/TE

Legend

- (C) Team captain
- (S) Suspended
- (I) Ineligible
- Injured
- Redshirt

Roster
Last update: 2002-10-31
