= 2002 Wyoming Cowboys football team =

American college football season

2002 Wyoming Cowboys football
- Conference: Mountain West Conference
- Record: 2–10 (1–6 MW)
- Head coach: Vic Koenning (3rd season)
- Co-offensive coordinators: Lawrence Livington (1st season); Rob Phenicie (1st season)
- Offensive scheme: Spread
- Defensive coordinator: Matt Wallerstedt (3rd season)
- Base defense: 3–4
- Home stadium: War Memorial Stadium

2002 Mountain West Conference football standings
	Conf.			Overall
Team	W		L	W		L
Colorado State $	6	–	1	10	–	4
New Mexico	5	–	2	7	–	7
Air Force	4	–	3	8	–	5
San Diego State	4	–	3	4	–	9
Utah	3	–	4	5	–	6
UNLV	3	–	4	5	–	7
BYU	2	–	5	5	–	7
Wyoming	1	–	6	2	–	10
$ – Conference champion; Rankings from AP Poll

The 2002 Wyoming Cowboys football team represented the University of Wyoming as a member Mountain West Conference (MW) during the 2002 NCAA Division I-A football season. Led by Vic Koenning in his third and final season as head coach, the Cowboys compiled an overall record of 2–10 record with mark 1–6 in conference play, placing last out of eight teams in the MW. The team played home games at War Memorial Stadium in Laramie, Wyoming.

== Schedule ==
Date	Time	Opponent	Site	TV	Result	Attendance
August 31	4:00 pm	at No. 4 Tennessee*	The Coliseum; Nashville, TN	ESPN2	L 7–47	67,221
September 7	11:00 am	at Central Michigan*	Kelly/Shorts Stadium; Mount Pleasant, MI		L 20–32	18,251
September 14	2:00 pm	Boise State*	War Memorial Stadium; Laramie, WY		L 13–35	16,256
September 21	8:00 pm	at No. 11 Washington*	Husky Stadium; Seattle, WA	FSN	L 7–38	72,898
October 5	2:00 pm	The Citadel*	War Memorial Stadium; Laramie, WY		W 34–30	12,787
October 12	1:00 pm	at Colorado State	Hughes Stadium; Fort Collins, CO (Border War)	ESPN Plus	L 36–44	32,151
October 19	1:00 pm	San Diego State^{†}	War Memorial Stadium; Laramie, WY		L 20–24	13,757
October 26	1:00 pm	No. 22 Air Force	War Memorial Stadium; Laramie, WY		W 34–26	15,022
November 2	5:00 pm	at UNLV	Sam Boyd Stadium; Whitney, NV	SPW	L 48–49 ^{OT}	23,346
November 9	4:00 pm	at BYU	LaVell Edwards Stadium; Provo, UT	SPW	L 31–35	61,689
November 16	10:00 am	Utah	War Memorial Stadium; Laramie, WY	SPW	L 18–23	10,611
November 30	12:00 pm	New Mexico	University Stadium; Albuquerque, NM	SPW	L 20–49	26,115
*Non-conference game; ^{†}Homecoming; Rankings from AP Poll released prior to the game; All times are in Mountain time

== Roster ==
2002 Wyoming Cowboys football team roster
Players
Coaches
Offense

Pos.	#	Name	Class
QB	14	Casey Bramlet	Jr
QB	17	Corey Bramlet	Fr
WR	88	Malcom Floyd	Jr
LB	52	John Wilson	Sr
OT	74	Adam Goldberg	Jr
QB	11	J. J. Raterink	So
WR	83	Scottie Vines	So

Defense

Pos.	#	Name	Class

Special teams

Pos.	#	Name	Class

Head coach

- Vic Koenning

Coordinators/assistant coaches

Legend

- (C) Team captain
- (S) Suspended
- (I) Ineligible
- Injured
- Redshirt
