= J. J. Raterink =

American football player and coach (born 1981)

J.J. Raterink
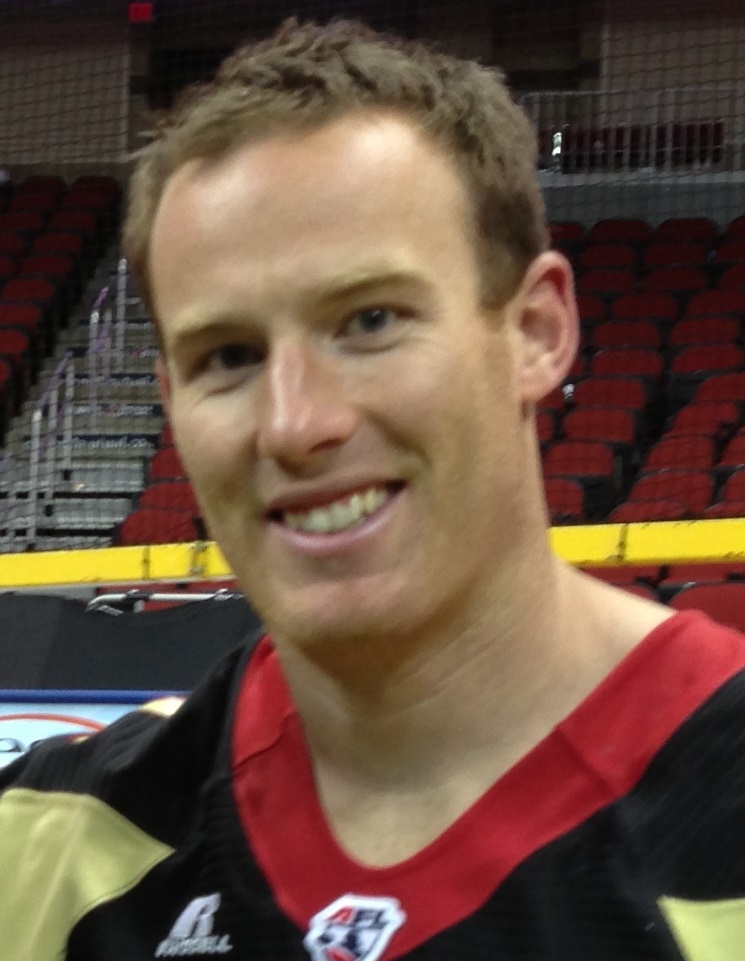
- Raterink in 2013

No. 11
- Position: Quarterback

Personal information
- Born: August 4, 1981 (age 45); Longmont, Colorado, U.S.
- Listed height: 6 ft 2 in (1.88 m)
- Listed weight: 210 lb (95 kg)

Career information
- High school: Skyline (Longmont)
- College: Wyoming (2000–2004)
- NFL draft: 2005: undrafted

Career history

Playing
- Spokane Shock (2006)*; Bossier–Shreveport Battle Wings (2006); Quad City Steamwheelers (2007–2009); Fairbanks Grizzlies (2009); Milwaukee Iron (2010)*; Chicago Rush (2010); Kansas City Command (2011); Chicago Rush (2011); Iowa Barnstormers (2012–2013); Los Angeles Kiss (2014); Jacksonville Sharks (2014); Iowa Barnstormers (2014); Philadelphia Soul (2014); Los Angeles Kiss (2014); Las Vegas Outlaws (2015); Guangzhou Power (2016); Baltimore Brigade (2017)
- * Offseason or practice squad member only

Coaching
- Valor Christian (CO) HS (2018–2019) Quarterbacks coach; Northern Colorado (2020–2022) Quarterbacks coach

Awards and highlights
- Al Lucas AFL Pulse Hero Award (2014); Quad City Steamwheelers records for career passing yards (11,152) and career touchdown passes (233).; Iowa Barnstormers records for passing yards in a season (4,870) and touchdown passes in a season (93) set in 2012

Career AFL statistics
- Comp. / Att.: 1,689 / 2,771
- Passing yards: 19,904
- TD–INT: 361–78
- QB rating: 103.65
- Rushing TD: 41
- Stats at ArenaFan.com

Jason J. Raterink (born August 4, 1981) is an American former professional football quarterback who played in the Arena Football League (AFL). He played college football for the Wyoming Cowboys.

== Early life ==
Born the son of Ginger and George Raterink, J.J. attended Skyline High School in Longmont, Colorado. While at Skyline High, he participated in baseball, basketball and football. Raterink was a captain in football, basketball and baseball. He graduated with a 4.0 grade point average and was a co-valedictorian of his class. He was named the Class 4A Academic Athlete of the Year for the state of Colorado during his senior season.

== College career ==
After high school, Raterink attended the University of Wyoming, where he was awarded a football scholarship. After taking a redshirt year in 2000, Raterink played very sparingly throughout his first three seasons of eligibility. He served mostly as the team's holder, while backing up brothers Casey and Corey Bramlet. Raterink saw more playing time as a senior. He was selected as the Co-Mountain West Player of the Week during his four touchdown performance in a triple overtime victory over UNLV which also made the Cowboys Bowl eligible for the first time in 11 years. In the 2004 Las Vegas Bowl against UCLA, Raterink caught a 22-yard touchdown on a reverse pass that helped the Cowboys upset the heavily favored Bruins 24–21. He graduated summa cum laude in the spring of 2005 with a perfect 4.0 GPA and was a finalist to be selected as a Rhodes Scholar.

== Professional career ==
Raterink went undrafted during the 2005 NFL draft.

=== Spokane Shock ===
In 2006, Raterink was in training camp with the Spokane Shock of the af2.

=== Bossier–Shreveport Battle Wings ===
In 2006, he was traded to the Bossier–Shreveport Battle Wings in Shreveport, Louisiana. He played in all 16 games for the Battlewings and started 15 games at quarterback. He threw for 2,936 yards and 43 touchdowns.

=== Quad City Steamwheelers ===
Raterink was assigned to the Quad City Steamwheelers of the af2 in November 2006. He played for the Steamwheelers for three seasons from 2007 to 2009 and held almost all offensive records for a quarterback. In 2009, Raterink asked for his release from the Steamwheelers. He had been placed on the four-week injury reserve with symptoms of a concussion, but said he felt fine and that he wanted to play.

=== Fairbanks Grizzlies ===
After his release from the Steamwheelers, Raterink joined several former Steamwheelers' players and coaches on the Fairbanks Grizzlies of the Indoor Football League. Raterink appeared in two games, completing 11 of 18 passes for 125-yards and 2 touchdowns and no interceptions.

=== Chicago Rush ===
Upon the completion of the 2009 season, Raterink considered retiring from professional football. He had begun working for the Quad City Mallards hockey team as well as Enterprise Rent-A-Car, when Mike Hohensee approached Raterink about becoming a backup quarterback for the Chicago Rush in the newly re-organized Arena Football League (AFL). Raterink spent the season as Russ Michna's backup, until Michna was lost for the season during a July game with the Dallas Vigilantes. Raterink started the final game for the Rush during the 2010 season, as well as the playoff game where they lost 64–54 to the Milwaukee Iron.

=== Kansas City Command ===
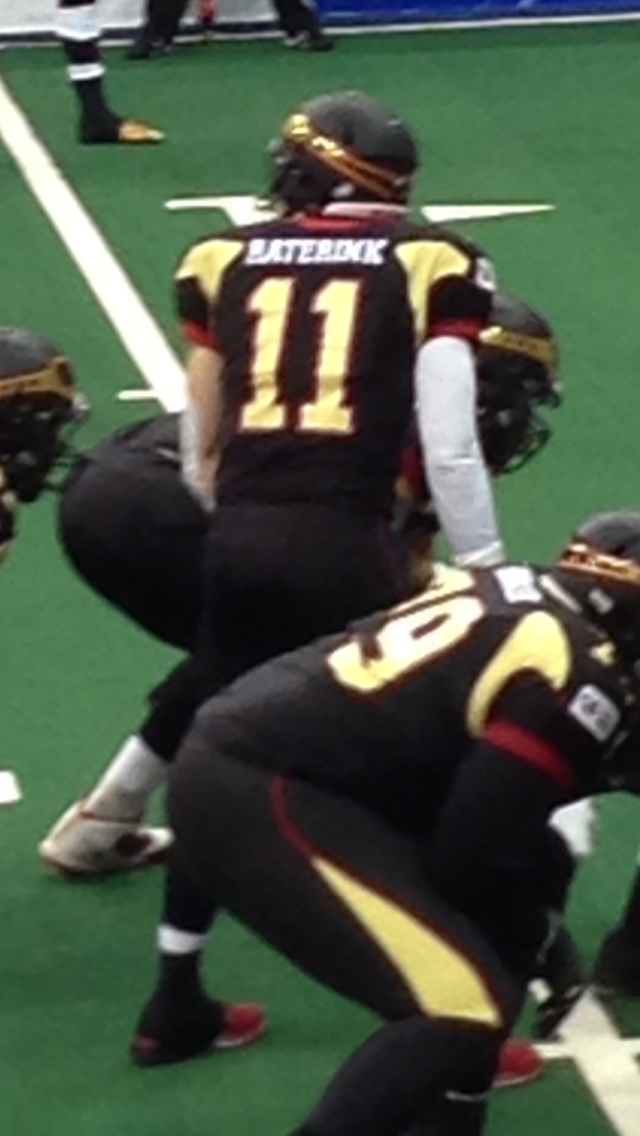
Raterink with the Iowa Barnstormers in 2013

Raterink was assigned to the expansion Kansas City Command of the AFL in 2011, where he was named the starting quarterback. After 13 games Raterink was traded back to Chicago.

=== Return to the Chicago Rush ===
Raterink returned to the Rush in 2011 when the Command traded Raterink for Todd Devoe and future considerations.

=== Iowa Barnstormers ===
Raterink was assigned to the AFL's Iowa Barnstormers in 2012. Raterink was named the starter for the Barnstormers out of training camp. Raterink was off to a great start of the season, when he was injured during a May 19 loss to the Jacksonville Sharks. Raterink sustained an AC contusion in this throwing shoulder, but returned to the lineup the following week playing with extra padding on is shoulder. He went on to set franchise records for passing yards in a single season (4,870) and passing touchdowns (93), passing Kurt Warner and Aaron Garcia respectively. The Barnstormers re-signed Raterink after the season to a two-year deal through the 2014 season.

=== Los Angeles Kiss ===
On September 10, 2013, Raterink was traded by the Barnstormers to the Los Angeles Kiss in exchange for Carson Coffman. He was awarded the Al Lucas AFL Pulse Hero Award for his philanthropic efforts during the 2014 season.

=== Return to the Iowa Barnstormers ===
On Monday May 12, Raterink was traded by the Los Angeles Kiss to the Jacksonville Sharks and then subsequently traded back to the Iowa Barnstormers.

=== Return to the KISS ===
On June 30, 2014, the Barnstormers traded Raterink to the Philadelphia Soul for future considerations. On the same day, the Soul traded Raterink back to the KISS for future considerations.

=== Las Vegas Outlaws ===
On October 28, 2014, Raterink and former Los Angeles Kiss teammate Donovan Morgan were announced as the first signings by the Las Vegas Outlaws of the AFL.

=== Guangzhou Power ===
Raterink was selected by the Guangzhou Power of the China Arena Football League (CAFL) in the 12th round of the 2016 CAFL draft, and was the starting quarterback for the Power during the 2016 season. He completed 82 of 144 passes for 1,152 yards, 20 touchdowns and 7 interceptions. He was listed on the Power's roster for the 2018 season.

=== Baltimore Brigade ===
Raterink was assigned to the AFL's Baltimore Brigade on August 2, 2017.

== Career statistics ==
=== AFL ===
Year	Team	Passing							Rushing		
Year	Team	Cmp	Att	Pct	Yds	TD	Int	Rtg	Att	Yds	TD
2010	Chicago	65	102	63.7	767	14	2	112.66	8	9	2
2011	Chicago	64	105	61.0	888	16	2	118.27	4	8	2
2011	Kansas City	311	500	62.2	3,723	65	17	103.28	48	138	5
2012	Iowa	413	618	66.8	4,870	93	10	121.49	37	110	8
2013	Iowa	346	575	60.2	4,015	78	18	102.19	32	10	8
2014	Los Angeles	211	383	55.1	2,335	38	19	77.53	6	5	1
2014	Iowa	101	163	62.0	1,320	22	1	118.65	37	111	9
2015	Las Vegas	178	325	54.8	1,986	35	9	88.57	32	19	6
Career		1,689	2,771	61.0	19,904	361	78	103.65	204	410	41

=== College ===
Season	Team	Passing							Rushing		
Season	Team	Comp	Att	Pct	Yds	TD	Int	Rtg	Att	Yds	TD
2001	Wyoming	3	5	60.0	37	0	0	122.2	1	1	0
2002	Wyoming	0	0	0.0	0	0	0	0.0	0	0	0
2003	Wyoming	0	0	0.0	0	0	0	0.0	0	0	0
2004	Wyoming	37	64	57.8	373	4	3	118.0	27	33	0
Totals		40	69	58.0	410	4	3	118.3	28	34	0

== Coaching career ==
Raterink was a part of Ed McCaffrey's coaching staff at Valor Christian High School from 2018 to 2019, where he helped Valor Christian win the 2018 5A state championship.

Raterink was the quarterbacks coach for Northern Colorado from 2020 to 2022, again under McCaffrey.
