= John Gustin =

Profile
- Position: Quarterback

Personal information
- Born: c. 1970
- Listed height: 6 ft 6 in (1.98 m)
- Listed weight: 236 lb (107 kg)

Career information
- High school: Borah (ID)
- College: Wyoming (1991–1992, 1994)

John Gustin (born c. 1970) is a former American football quarterback. He attended Borah High School in Boise, Idaho, graduating in 1988. He played college football for the Wyoming Cowboys in 1991, 1992 and 1994. As a senior, he led the 1994 Wyoming team to a 6–6 record and ranked among the leading quarterbacks in major-college football with 2,757 passing yards (8th), 2,795 total yards (6th), nine passing yards per attempt (2nd), and 15.2 passing yards per completion (7th). On October 24, 1994, he was named the WAC offensive player of the week after tallying career highs against San Diego State, as he completed 31 of 42 passes (.738) for 401 yards and five touchdowns. In three years at Wyoming, he completed 206 of 365 passes (56.4%) for 3,051 yards, 19 touchdowns, 19 interceptions, and a 133.4 passer rating.

== See also ==
- Wyoming Cowboys football statistical leaders
