= 2002 Utah Utes football team =

American college football season

2002 Utah Utes football
- Conference: Mountain West Conference
- Record: 5–6 (3–4 MW)
- Head coach: Ron McBride (13th season)
- Offensive coordinator: Craig Ver Steeg (2nd season)
- Offensive scheme: Pro-style
- Defensive coordinator: Kyle Whittingham (8th season)
- Base defense: 4–3
- Home stadium: Rice–Eccles Stadium]

2002 Mountain West Conference football standings
	Conf.			Overall
Team	W		L	W		L
Colorado State $	6	–	1	10	–	4
New Mexico	5	–	2	7	–	7
Air Force	4	–	3	8	–	5
San Diego State	4	–	3	4	–	9
Utah	3	–	4	5	–	6
UNLV	3	–	4	5	–	7
BYU	2	–	5	5	–	7
Wyoming	1	–	6	2	–	10
$ – Conference champion; Rankings from AP Poll

The 2002 Utah Utes football team represented the University of Utah as a member of the Mountain West Conference (MW) during the 2002 NCAA Division I-A football season. Led by Ron McBride in his 13th and final season as head coach, the Utes compiled an overall record of 5–6 with a mark of 3–4 in conference play, tying for fifth place in the MW. Utah played home games at Rice–Eccles Stadium in Salt Lake City.

== Schedule ==
Date	Time	Opponent	Site	TV	Result	Attendance
August 31	7:00 pm	at Utah State*	Romney Stadium; Logan, UT (Battle of the Brothers)	KJZZ	W 23–3	30,757
September 7	6:00 pm	Indiana*	Rice–Eccles Stadium; Salt Lake City, UT	KJZZ	W 40–13	33,419
September 14	7:22 pm	at Arizona*	Arizona Stadium; Tucson, AZ	KJZZ	L 17–23	44,243
September 21	10:00 am	at No. 14 Michigan*	Michigan Stadium; Ann Arbor, MI	ESPN	L 7–10	109,734
September 28	1:00 pm	Air Force^{†}	Rice–Eccles Stadium; Salt Lake City, UT	ESPN Plus	L 26–30	35,659
October 12	5:00 pm	at San Diego State	Qualcomm Stadium; San Diego, CA	KJZZ	L 17–36	20,410
October 19	1:00 pm	Colorado State	Rice–Eccles Stadium; Salt Lake City, UT	ESPN Plus	L 20–28	34,374
October 26	1:00 pm	at New Mexico	University Stadium; Albuquerque, NM	ESPN Plus	L 35–42 ^{OT}	27,300
November 9	5:00 pm	UNLV	Rice–Eccles Stadium; Salt Lake City, UT	KJZZ	W 28–17	28,528
November 16	10:00 am	at Wyoming	War Memorial Stadium; Laramie, WY	KJZZ	W 23–18	10,611
November 23	1:00 pm	BYU	Rice–Eccles Stadium; Salt Lake City, UT (Holy War)	ESPN Plus	W 13–6	45,167
*Non-conference game; ^{†}Homecoming; Rankings from AP Poll released prior to the game; All times are in Mountain time

== Roster ==
2002 Utah Utes football team roster
Players
Coaches
Offense

Pos.	#	Name	Class
OT	69	Jordan Gross	Sr
TE	89	Matt Hansen	Jr
WR	88	Travis LaTendresse	Fr
QB	11	Alex Smith	Fr

Defense

Pos.	#	Name	Class
DB	4	Antwoine Sanders	Jr
DL	97	Lauvale Sape	Sr
DE	44	Josh Savage	Jr
DE	63	Garrett Smith	Sr
DB	30	Soane Taliauli	Fr
LB	5	Steven Thompson	Fr
LB	49	Spencer Toone	So
LB	13	Zach Tune	So
DB	3	Cody Weight	Sr
DB	10	Anthony White	Jr
DB	2	Antonio Young	Fr

Special teams

Pos.	#	Name	Class

Head coach

- Ron McBride

Coordinators/assistant coaches

Legend

- (C) Team captain
- (S) Suspended
- (I) Ineligible
- Injured
- Redshirt

Roster
Last update: 2002-12-02

== After the season ==
=== NFL draft ===
Three players went in the 2003 NFL draft, including first rounder and future pro bowler Jordan Gross.

Player	Position	Round	Pick	NFL club
Jordan Gross	Offensive tackle	1	8	Carolina Panthers
Lauvale Sape	Defensive tackle	6	187	Buffalo Bills
Antwoine Sanders	Defensive back	7	258	Baltimore Ravens
