= 2002 Mountain West Conference football season =

- League: NCAA Division I FBS
- Sport: football
- Teams: 8

2003 NFL draft
- Top draft pick: Jordan Gross, offensive tackle, Utah
- Picked by: Carolina Panthers, 8th overall

Regular season
- Season champions: Colorado State
- Runners-up: New Mexico
- Top scorer: Chance Harridge (132 points)

Football seasons
- 2001 2003

2002 Mountain West Conference football standings
	Conf.			Overall
Team	W		L	W		L
Colorado State $	6	–	1	10	–	4
New Mexico	5	–	2	7	–	7
Air Force	4	–	3	8	–	5
San Diego State	4	–	3	4	–	9
Utah	3	–	4	5	–	6
UNLV	3	–	4	5	–	7
BYU	2	–	5	5	–	7
Wyoming	1	–	6	2	–	10
$ – Conference champion; Rankings from AP Poll

The 2002 Mountain West Conference football season was the fourth since eight former members of the Western Athletic Conference banded together to form the Mountain West Conference. Colorado State won the conference championship in 2002, the Rams' third title since the league began in 1999.

== Bowl games ==
Bowl	Date	Stadium	City	Result
Las Vegas Bowl	December 25, 2002	Sam Boyd Stadium	Las Vegas	UCLA 27, New Mexico 13
Liberty Bowl	December 31, 2002	Liberty Bowl Memorial Stadium	Memphis, Tennessee	TCU 17, Colorado State 3
San Francisco Bowl	December 31, 2002	SBC Park	San Francisco	Virginia Tech 20, Air Force 13

In 2002, the Mountain West Conference had four contractual tie-ins with bowl games. In order, the Liberty Bowl, Las Vegas Bowl, San Francisco Bowl and Seattle Bowl had the first through fourth selections of bowl eligible MW teams. However, following the conclusion of the 2002 college football season, only three MW teams had good enough records (six wins or more) to make them eligible for bowl games: Colorado State, New Mexico, and Air Force.

The Liberty Bowl, with the first selection of eligible MW teams, picked the MW champion Colorado State Rams to represent the conference in its 2002 game. The Rams played the TCU Horned Frogs of Conference USA and lost, 17–3. With the second pick, the Las Vegas Bowl selected the New Mexico Lobos. Though New Mexico lost to favored UCLA, 27–13, the Lobos featured the first female player to play in a Division I football game, Katie Hnida. The third bowl with an MW tie-in, the San Francisco Bowl, was thus forced to select the Air Force Academy Falcons, who were the sole remaining bowl-eligible MW team. Facing the Falcons were the Virginia Tech Hokies, who earned a 20–13 victory over the Falcons.

== Awards ==
- Coach of the Year: Rocky Long, New Mexico
- Offensive Player of the Year: QB Bradlee Van Pelt, Jr, Colorado State
- Defensive Player of the Year: CB Jamaal Brimmer, So, UNLV
- Freshman of the Year: RB DonTrell Moore, New Mexico

== All-Conference teams ==
First-team:

Offense
Quarterback	Bradlee Van Pelt, Jr, Colorado State
Running back	DonTrell Moore, Fr, New Mexico; Cecil Sapp, Sr, Colorado State
Wide receiver	Kassim Osgood, Sr, San Diego State; J. R. Tolver, Sr, San Diego State
Tight end	Joel Dreessen, So, Colorado State
Offensive Line	Jordan Gross, Sr, Utah; Morgan Pears, Sr, Colorado State; Adam Goldberg, Sr, Wyoming; Dustin Rykert, Sr, BYU; Tony Terrell, Sr, UNLV
Kicker	Joey Ashcroft, Jr, Air Force
Kick returner	Dexter Wynn, Jr, Colorado State

Defense
Defensive line	Peter Hogan, Sr, Colorado State; Jason Kaufusi, Jr, Utah; Brady Poppinga, So, BYU; Garrett Smith, Sr, Utah
Linebacker	Kirk Morrison, So, San Diego State; Charles Moss, Sr, New Mexico; Anthony Schlegel, So, Air Force
Defensive back	Jamaal Brimmer, So, UNLV; Wes Crawley, Sr, Air Force; Brandon Ratcliff, Sr, New Mexico; Antwoine Sanders, Jr, Utah
Punter	Matt Payne, So, BYU

Second-team:

Offense
Quarterback	Chance Harridge, Jr, Air Force
Running back	Joe Haro, Sr, UNLV; Brandon Warfield, Jr, Utah
Wide receiver	Reno Mahe, Sr, BYU; Earvin Johnson, So, UNLV
Tight end	Spencer Nead, Sr, BYU
Offensive Line	Jesse Underbakke, Jr, Air Force; Mark Dreyer, Jr, Colorado State; Jason Lenzmeier, Jr, New Mexico; Claude Terrell, So, New Mexico; Johnathan Ingram, Sr, San Diego State
Kicker	Jeff Babcock, So, Colorado State
Kick returner	Dwight Counter, Jr, New Mexico

Defense
Defensive line	Daniel Kegler, Jr, New Mexico; D. J. Renteria, Jr, New Mexico; Amon Arnold, Sr, San Diego; Lauvale Sape, Sr, Utah
Linebacker	Eric Pauly, Jr, Colorado State; Adam Seward, So, UNLV; Sheldon Deckart, Sr, Utah
Defensive back	Rhett Nelson, Sr, Colorado State; Dexter Wynn, Jr, Colorado State; Jeff Shoate, Jr, San Diego State; Dave Revill, Jr, Utah
Punter	Joey Huber, Sr, Colorado State
