= Adam Goldberg (disambiguation) =

Adam Goldberg (born 1970) is an American actor.

Adam Goldberg may also refer to:

- Adam F. Goldberg (born 1976), American film and television writer
- Adam Goldberg (American football) (born 1980), American former football offensive tackle
