= 2002 New Mexico Lobos football team =

American college football season

2002 New Mexico Lobos football
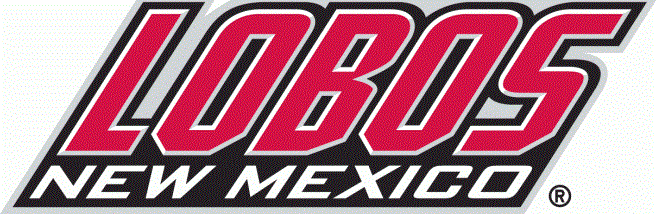

Las Vegas Bowl, L 13–27 vs. UCLA
- Conference: Mountain West Conference
- Record: 7–7 (5–2 MW)
- Head coach: Rocky Long (5th season)
- Offensive coordinator: Dan Dodd (3rd season)
- Offensive scheme: Multiple
- Defensive coordinator: Bronco Mendenhall (5th season)
- Base defense: 3–3–5
- Home stadium: University Stadium

2002 Mountain West Conference football standings
	Conf.			Overall
Team	W		L	W		L
Colorado State $	6	–	1	10	–	4
New Mexico	5	–	2	7	–	7
Air Force	4	–	3	8	–	5
San Diego State	4	–	3	4	–	9
Utah	3	–	4	5	–	6
UNLV	3	–	4	5	–	7
BYU	2	–	5	5	–	7
Wyoming	1	–	6	2	–	10
$ – Conference champion; Rankings from AP Poll

The 2002 New Mexico Lobos football team represented the University of New Mexico as a member of the Mountain West Conference (MW) during the 2002 NCAA Division I-A football season. Led by fifth-year head coach Rocky Long, the Lobos compiled an overall record of 7–7 with a mark of 5–2 in conference play, placing second in the MW. New Mexico was invited to the Las Vegas Bowl, where the Lobos lost to UCLA. The team played home games at University Stadium in Albuquerque, New Mexico.

== Schedule ==
Date	Opponent	Site	Result	Attendance	Source
August 24	at NC State*	Carter–Finley Stadium; Raleigh, NC (BCA Classic)	L 14–34	47,018	
August 31	Weber State*	University Stadium; Albuquerque, NM	W 38–24	35,765	
September 7	at Air Force	Falcon Stadium; Colorado Springs, CO	L 31–38 ^{OT}	36,620	
September 14	Baylor*	University Stadium; Albuquerque, NM	W 23–0	30,013	
September 21	at New Mexico State*	Aggie Memorial Stadium; Las Cruces, NM (Rio Grande Rivalry)	L 13–24	28,587	
September 27	Texas Tech*	University Stadium; Albuquerque, NM	L 0–49	35,111	
October 12	at UNLV	Sam Boyd Stadium; Whitney, NV	W 25–16	21,205	
October 19	at Utah State*	Romney Stadium; Logan, UT	L 44–45 ^{OT}	15,942	
October 26	Utah^{†}	University Stadium; Albuquerque, NM	W 42–35 ^{OT}	27,300	
November 9	San Diego State	University Stadium; Albuquerque, NM	W 15–8	28,770	
November 16	at BYU	LaVell Edwards Stadium; Provo, UT	W 20–16	60,764	
November 23	at No. 20 Colorado State	Hughes Stadium; Fort Collins, CO	L 14–22	30,215	
November 30	Wyoming	University Stadium; Albuquerque, NM	W 49–20	26,115	
December 25	vs. UCLA*	Sam Boyd Stadium; Whitney, NV (Las Vegas Bowl)	L 13–27	30,324	
*Non-conference game; ^{†}Homecoming; Rankings from AP Poll released prior to the game

== Roster ==
2002 New Mexico Lobos football team roster
Players			Coaches
Offense: Pos. / # / Name / Class	Defense: Pos. / # / Name / Class; LB / 89 / Nick Speegle / So	Special teams: Pos. / # / Name / Class	Head coach: Rocky Long; Coordinators/assistant coaches Legend: (C) Team captain; (S) Suspended; (I) Ineligible; Injured; Redshirt; Roster; Last update: 2002-11-14
