= Morgan Pears =

American football player (born 1980)

No. 70, 75
- Position: Offensive tackle

Personal information
- Born: May 4, 1980 (age 46); Los Angeles, California, U.S.
- Listed height: 6 ft 6 in (1.98 m)
- Listed weight: 332 lb (151 kg)

Career information
- High school: John F. Kennedy (Bear Valley, Denver, Colorado)
- College: Colorado State
- NFL draft: 2003: undrafted

Career history
- Miami Dolphins (2003)*; Pittsburgh Steelers (2003-2004)*; Scottish Claymores (2004); New York Giants (2004); Rhein Fire (2005)
- * Offseason or practice squad member only

Awards and highlights
- First-team All-MW (2002)

Career NFL statistics
- Games played: 2
- Stats at Pro Football Reference

Morgan Tattonchantry Pears (born May 4, 1980) is an American former professional football player who was a offensive tackle for one season with the New York Giants of the National Football League (NFL). He played college football for the Colorado State Rams and was signed as an undrafted free agent by the Miami Dolphins following the 2003 NFL draft.

== Early life and education ==
Morgan Pears was born on May 4, 1980, in Los Angeles, California. Shortly afterwards his family moved to Denver, Colorado, where he would live until his professional football career started. As a child he shared a basement bedroom with his younger brother Erik (born 1982). "I think he hated me until we got into college," he said. "There were just constant battles between us. That basement room just wasn't big enough for us. There are a lot of holes in the wall and ceiling, but we did a lot of stuff together, too."

He attended John F. Kennedy High School in Denver before earning a scholarship from Colorado State University. He joined the university in 1998, and spent the season as a redshirt. He played with their Rams football team for the following four years, earning a varsity letter in each season. His final two seasons were played alongside his brother.

== Professional career ==
Following the 2003 NFL draft where he went unselected, Pears signed a contract with the Miami Dolphins as an undrafted free agent. He was released at roster cuts in late August.

At the beginning of October, Pears was given a contract by the Pittsburgh Steelers to be on their practice squad. He was promoted to the active roster before the final game of the season but did not play. He later was sent to the Scottish Claymores of NFL Europe, where he played in ten games, starting five, as they finished 6th in the league with a 2–8 record. He was released by Pittsburgh on August 27 at roster cuts.

On September 21, Pears was signed by the New York Giants as a practice squad member. He spent the rest of the season in that position before being promoted to the active roster prior to a week 16 game against the Cincinnati Bengals. The Giants lost on a last-minute Chad Johnson touchdown 22–23. He would also appear in the season finale, a 28–24 win against the Dallas Cowboys. He returned to NFL Europe following the season, appearing in ten games with the Rhein Fire. He was released the following season, ending his professional career.

== Personal life ==
His brother, Erik, played for multiple teams between 2005 and 2015, appearing in 117 games, starting 102.
