= 2002 BYU Cougars football team =

American college football season

2002 BYU Cougars football
- Conference: Mountain West Conference
- Record: 5–7 (2–5 MW)
- Head coach: Gary Crowton (2nd season)
- Offensive coordinator: Mike Borich (2nd season)
- Offensive scheme: Spread
- Defensive coordinator: Ken Schmidt (12th season)
- Base defense: 4–3
- Home stadium: LaVell Edwards Stadium

2002 Mountain West Conference football standings
	Conf.			Overall
Team	W		L	W		L
Colorado State $	6	–	1	10	–	4
New Mexico	5	–	2	7	–	7
Air Force	4	–	3	8	–	5
San Diego State	4	–	3	4	–	9
Utah	3	–	4	5	–	6
UNLV	3	–	4	5	–	7
BYU	2	–	5	5	–	7
Wyoming	1	–	6	2	–	10
$ – Conference champion; Rankings from AP Poll

The 2002 BYU Cougars football team represented Brigham Young University during the 2002 NCAA Division I-A football season.

== Schedule ==
Date	Time	Opponent	Rank	Site	TV	Result	Attendance
August 29	5:30 pm	Syracuse*		LaVell Edwards Stadium; Provo, UT	ESPN	W 42–21	65,612
September 6	5:00 pm	Hawaii*		LaVell Edwards Stadium; Provo, UT	ESPN	W 35–32	63,085
September 14	2:05 pm	at Nevada*	No. 24	Mackay Stadium; Reno, NV	SWP	L 28–31	23,109
September 21	1:30 pm	at Georgia Tech*		Bobby Dodd Stadium; Atlanta, GA	ABC	L 19–28	43,719
October 4	7:00 pm	at Utah State*		Romney Stadium; Logan, UT (Old Wagon Wheel)	SWP	W 35–34	30,341
October 12	8:00 pm	at No. 19 Air Force		Falcon Stadium; Colorado Springs, CO	ESPN2	L 9–52	42,214
October 19	5:00 pm	UNLV		LaVell Edwards Stadium; Provo, UT	SWP	L 3–24	62,543
October 24	8:00 pm	at Colorado State		Hughes Stadium; Fort Collins, CO	ESPN2	L 10–37	29,457
November 2	1:00 pm	San Diego State		LaVell Edwards Stadium; Provo, UT	ESPN Plus	W 34–10	59,362
November 9	4:00 pm	Wyoming		LaVell Edwards Stadium; Provo, UT	SWP	W 35–31	61,689
November 16	4:00 pm	New Mexico		LaVell Edwards Stadium; Provo, UT	SWP	L 16–20	60,764
November 23	1:00 pm	at Utah		Rice–Eccles Stadium; Salt Lake City, UT (Holy War)	ESPN Plus	L 6–13	45,167
*Non-conference game; Rankings from Coaches Poll released prior to the game

•SportWest Productions (SWP) games were shown locally on KSL 5.

== Game summaries ==
=== Syracuse ===
Team	1	2	3	4	Total
Syracuse	7	7	7	0	21
• BYU	7	14	6	15	42

- Date: August 29
- Location: LaVell Edwards Stadium, Provo, UT
- Game start: 5:45 p.m. MDT
- Elapsed time: 3:40
- Game attendance: 65,612
- Game weather: 88 °F (31 °C), Partly Cloudy, winds SW 5 mph (8.0 km/h)
- Referee: Gene Steratore
- TV announcers (ESPN): Mike Tirico, Kirk Herbstreit, Lee Corso, Dr. Jerry Punch

Scoring summary
1	8:14	BYU	Andrew Ord 6-yard pass from Bret Engemann (Matt Payne kick)	BYU 7–0
1	3:43	SU	Jamel Riddle 17-yard run (Colin Barber kick)	TIED 7–7
2	14:46	BYU	Toby Christensen 2-yard pass from Bret Engemann (Matt Payne kick)	BYU 14–7
2	4:53	BYU	Marcus Whalen 1-yard run (Matt Payne kick)	BYU 21–7
2	1:13	SU	Damien Rhodes 5-yard run (Colin Barber kick)	BYU 21–14
3	6:08	SU	Damien Rhodes 4-yard run (Colin Barber kick)	TIED 21–21
3	2:43	BYU	Bret Engemann 3-yard run (kick failed)	BYU 27–21
4	8:23	BYU	David Christensen 50-yard pass from Bret Engemann (kick failed)	BYU 33–21
4	6:33	BYU	Matt Payne 31-yard field goal	BYU 36–21
4	1:47	BYU	Curtis Brown 1-yard run (kick failed)	BYU 42–21

=== Hawaii ===
Team	1	2	3	4	Total
Hawaii	10	7	0	15	32
• BYU	0	14	14	7	35

- Date: September 6
- Location: LaVell Edwards Stadium, Provo, UT
- Game start: 5:05 p.m. MDT
- Elapsed time: 4:00
- Game attendance: 63,085
- Game weather: 72 °F (22 °C), Overcast, winds 0–2 mph (0.0–3.2 km/h)
- Referee: Clair Gausman
- TV announcers (ESPN): Jeff Hullinger, Todd Christensen, Alex Flanagan

Scoring summary
1	8:27	HAW	Justin Ayat 22-yard field goal	HAW 3–0
1	6:15	HAW	Neal Gossett 6-yard pass from Jason Whieldon (Justin Ayat kick)	HAW 10–0
2	12:38	BYU	Marcus Whalen 1-yard run (Matt Payne kick)	HAW 10–7
2	8:07	HAW	Thero Mitchell 4-yard run (Justin Ayat kick)	HAW 17–7
2	0:22	BYU	Toby Christensen 19-yard pass from Bret Engemann (Matt Payne kick)	HAW 17–14
3	6:51	BYU	Lance Pendleton 12-yard run (Matt Payne kick)	BYU 21–17
3	2:52	BYU	Marcus Whalen 4-yard run (Matt Payne kick)	BYU 28–17
4	14:10	HAW	Britton Komine 1-yard pass from Jason Whieldon (Justin Ayat kick)	BYU 28–24
4	2:36	BYU	Lance Pendleton 2-yard run (Matt Payne kick)	BYU 35–24
4	0:32	HAW	Thero Mitchell 4-yard run (Clifton Herbert pass from Timmy Chang)	BYU 35–32

=== Nevada ===
Team	1	2	3	4	Total
#RV/24 BYU	0	14	14	0	28
• Nevada	10	21	0	0	31

- Date: September 14
- Location: Mackay Stadium, Reno, NV
- Game start: 1:07 p.m. PDT
- Elapsed time: 3:24
- Game attendance: 23,109
- Game weather: 85 °F (29 °C), Sunny w/ high clouds, winds light
- Referee: Gene Semko
- TV announcers (SportsWest): Dave McCann, Blaine Fowler

Scoring summary
1	3:31	UNR	Damon Fine 41-yard field goal	UNR 3–0
1	1:30	UNR	Nate Burleson 95-yard pass from Zac Threadgill (Damon Fine kick)	UNR 10–0
2	14:54	BYU	Rod Wilkerson 31-yard pass from Bret Engemann (Matt Payne kick)	UNR 10–7
2	11:02	UNR	Dan Bythwood 16-yard pass from Zac Threadgill (Damon Fine kick)	UNR 17–7
2	6:59	BYU	Reno Mahe 6-yard run (Matt Payne kick)	UNR 17–14
2	0:48	UNR	Eric Streelman 13-yard pass from Zac Threadgill (Damon Fine kick)	UNR 24–14
2	0:01	UNR	Tim Fleming 9-yard pass from Zac Threadgill (Damon Fine kick)	UNR 31–14
3	10:21	BYU	Marcus Whalen 30-yard run (Matt Payne kick)	UNR 31–21
3	4:09	BYU	Gabriel Reid 9-yard pass from Lance Pendleton (Matt Payne kick)	UNR 31–28

=== Georgia Tech ===
Team	1	2	3	4	Total
BYU	0	10	9	0	19
• Georgia Tech	0	7	7	14	28

- Date: September 21
- Location: Bobby Dodd Stadium, Atlanta, GA
- Game start: 3:37 p.m. EDT
- Elapsed time: 3:33
- Game attendance: 43,719
- Game weather: 81 °F (27 °C), Cloudy, winds SSE 7 mph (11 km/h)
- Referee: Ken Flaherty
- TV announcers (ABC): Tim Brant, Ed Cunningham, Sam Ryan

Scoring summary
2	14:52	GT	Tony Hollings 1-yard run (Luke Manget kick)	GT 7–0
2	10:22	BYU	Matt Payne 48-yard field goal	GT 7–3
2	7:05	BYU	Lance Pendleton 2-yard run (Matt Payne kick)	BYU 10–7
3	10:55	GT	Ajenavi Eziemefe 1-yard run (Luke Manget kick)	GT 14–10
3	6:52	BYU	Matt payne 39-yard field goal	GT 14–13
3	2:55	BYU	Reno Mahe 17-yard pass from Lance Pendleton (pass failed)	BYU 19–14
4	13:08	GT	Tony Hollings 2-yard run (Luke Manget kick)	GT 21–19
4	5:03	GT	Tony Hollings 2-yard run (Luke Manget kick)	GT 28–19

=== Utah State ===
Team	1	2	3	4	Total
• BYU	0	7	14	14	35
Utah State	3	31	0	0	34

- Date: October 4
- Location: Romney Stadium, Logan, UT
- Game start: 7:05 p.m. MDT
- Elapsed time: 3:40
- Game attendance: 30,341
- Game weather: 52 °F (11 °C), Partly Cloudy, winds Calm
- Referee: Ken Rivera
- TV announcers (SportsWest): Dave McCann, Blaine Fowler

Scoring summary
1	8:13	USU	Dane Kidman 21-yard field goal	USU 3–0
2	14:56	USU	Richard Watson 1-yard run (Dane Kidman kick)	USU 10–0
2	11:11	USU	James Samuel 73-yard run (Dane Kidman kick)	USU 17–0
2	7:47	BYU	Curtis Brown 2-yard run (Matt Payne kick)	USU 17–7
2	4:38	USU	Kevin Curtis 14-yard run (Dane Kidman kick)	USU 24–7
2	0:26	USU	Dane Kidman 39-yard field goal	USU 27–7
2	0:00	USU	Jerome Dennis 76-yard interception return (Dane Kidman kick)	USU 34–7
3	9:58	BYU	Curtis Brown 1-yard run (Matt Payne kick)	USU 34–14
3	5:55	BYU	Curtis Brown 32-yard run (Matt Payne kick)	USU 34–21
4	9:55	BYU	Jason Kukahiko 17-yard pass from Toby Christensen (Matt Payne kick)	USU 34–28
4	6:46	BYU	Gabriel Reid 18-yard pass from Bret Engemann (Matt Payne kick)	BYU 35–34

=== Air Force ===
Team	1	2	3	4	Total
BYU	3	0	0	6	9
• #21/19 Air Force	14	14	10	14	52

- Date: October 12
- Location: Falcon Stadium, Colorado Springs, CO
- Game start: 8:06 p.m. MDT
- Elapsed time: 3:07
- Game attendance: 42,214
- Game weather: 35 °F (2 °C), clear, winds SE 10–12 mph (16–19 km/h)
- Referee: Gerald Wright
- TV announcers (ESPN2): Jeff Hullinger, Todd Christensen, Stacy Paetz

Scoring summary
1	11:40	BYU	Matt Payne 35-yard field goal	BYU 3-0
1	5:43	AFA	Chance Harridge 1-yard run (Joey Ashcroft kick)	AFA 7-3
1	1:06	AFA	Chance Harridge 4-yard run (Joey Ashcroft kick)	AFA 14-3
2	13:04	AFA	Darnell Stephens 7-yard run (Joey Ashcroft kick)	AFA 21-3
2	10:23	AFA	Chance Harridge 11-yard run (Joey Ashcroft kick)	AFA 28-3
3	10:42	AFA	Chance Harridge 1-yard run (Joey Ashcroft kick)	AFA 35-3
3	4:16	AFA	Joey Ashcroft 44-yard field goal	AFA 38-3
4	6:17	AFA	Adam Cole 1-yard run (Joey Ashcroft kick)	AFA 45-3
4	5:36	BYU	Gabriel Reid 13-yard pass from Matt Berry (pass intercepted)	AFA 45-9
4	1:28	AFA	Tim Gehrsitz 1-yard run (Joey Ashcroft kick)	AFA 52-9

=== UNLV ===
Team	1	2	3	4	Total
• UNLV	3	0	6	15	24
BYU	0	3	0	0	3

- Date: October 19
- Location: LaVell Edwards Stadium, Provo, UT
- Game start: 5:06 p.m. MDT
- Elapsed time: 3:01
- Game attendance: 62,543
- Game weather: 68 °F (20 °C), clear, winds N 2–3 mph (3.2–4.8 km/h)
- Referee: Ken Flaherty
- TV announcers (SportsWest): Dave McCann, Blaine Fowler

Scoring summary
1	11:24	UNLV	Dillon Pieffer 27-yard field goal	UNLV 3-0
2	8:10	BYU	Matt Payne 24-yard field goal	TIED 3-3
3	12:16	UNLV	Jason Thomas 6-yard run (Michael Freund pass intercepted)	UNLV 9-3
4	10:06	UNLV	Jamaal Brimmer 27-yard fumble return (Earvin Johnson pass)	UNLV 17-3
4	3:01	UNLV	Chameio Sutton 38-yard interception return (Dillon Pieffer kick)	UNLV 24-3

=== Colorado State ===
Team	1	2	3	4	Total
BYU	0	10	0	0	10
• Colorado State	17	7	3	10	37

- Date: October 24
- Location: Hughes Stadium, Ft. Collins, CO
- Game start: 8:06 p.m. MDT
- Elapsed time: 2:57
- Game attendance: 29,457
- Game weather: 31 °F (−1 °C), cold and overcast, winds SE 2 mph (3.2 km/h)
- Referee: Ken Rivera
- TV announcers (ESPN2): Jeff Hullinger, Todd Christensen, Stacy Paetz

Scoring summary
1	11:10	CSU	Jeff Babcock 31-yard field goal	CSU 3-0
1	9:05	CSU	Cecil Sapp 7-yard run (Jeff Babcock kick)	CSU 10-0
1	2:44	CSU	Brad Van Pelt 3-yard run (Jeff Babcock kick)	CSU 17-0
2	13:10	BYU	Matt Berry 1-yard run (Matt Payne kick)	CSU 17-7
2	3:44	BYU	Matt Payne 25-yard field goal	CSU 17-10
2	0:46	CSU	Rahsaan Sanders 21-yard run (Jeff Babcock kick)	CSU 24-10
3	4:48	CSU	Jeff Babcock 27-yard field goal	CSU 27-10
4	7:16	CSU	Cecil Saap 7-yard run (Jeff Babcock kick)	CSU 34-10
4	3:19	CSU	Jeff Babcock 40-yard field goal	CSU 37-10

=== San Diego State ===
Team	1	2	3	4	Total
San Diego State	0	0	3	7	10
• BYU	10	10	6	8	34

- Date: November 2
- Location: LaVell Edwards Stadium, Provo, UT
- Game start: 1:05 p.m. MST
- Elapsed time: 3:15
- Game attendance: 59,362
- Game weather: 40 °F (4 °C), clear, wind SW 5–7 mph (8.0–11.3 km/h)
- Referee: Jack Wood
- TV announcers (ESPN+): Gary Bender, JC Pearson, Beth Mowins

Scoring summary
1	9:09	BYU	Matt Payne 49-yard field goal	BYU 3-0
1	7:13	BYU	Jason Kukahiko 37-yard pass from Matt Berry (Matt Payne kick)	BYU 10-0
2	3:59	BYU	Marcus Whalen 4-yard run (Matt Payne kick)	BYU 17-0
2	0:03	BYU	Matt Payne 47-yard field goal	BYU 20-0
3	6:51	BYU	Reno Mahe 4-yard pass from Matt Berry (Berry pass failed)	BYU 26-0
3	4:11	SDSU	Tommy Kirovski 40-yard field goal	BYU 26-3
3	2:47	BYU	Matt Payne 42-yard field goal	BYU 26-3
4	14:55	SDSU	J.R. Tolver 8-yard pass from Adam Hall (Tommy Kirovski kick)	BYU 26-10
4	10:52	BYU	Gabriel Reed 27-yard pass from Matt Berry (Matt Berry run)	BYU 34-10

=== Wyoming ===
Team	1	2	3	4	Total
Wyoming	7	7	9	8	31
• BYU	0	21	7	7	35

- Date: November 9
- Location: LaVell Edwards Stadium, Provo, UT
- Game start: 4:07 p.m. MST
- Elapsed time: 3:18
- Game attendance: 61,689
- Game weather: 46 °F (8 °C), cloudy, wind N 2–5 mph (3.2–8.0 km/h)
- Referee: Gerald Wright
- TV announcers (SportsWest): Dave McCann, Blaine Fowler

Scoring summary
1	13:14	WY	Casey Bramlet 3-yard run (Scott Parker kick)	WY 7-0
2	10:57	BYU	Marcus Whalen 6-yard run (Matt Payne kick)	TIED 7-7
2	7:25	BYU	Spencer Nead 15-yard pass from Matt Berry (Matt Payne kick)	BYU 14-7
2	5:58	WY	Derek Armah 36-yard pass from Casey Bramlet (Scott Parker kick)	TIED 14-14
2	3:27	BYU	Lanc Pendleton 6-yard run (Matt Payne kick)	BYU 21-14
3	12:09	WY	Scott Parker 21-yard field goal	BYU 21-17
3	7:25	BYU	Andrew Ord 21-yard pass from Matt Berry (Matt Payne kick)	BYU 28-17
3	0:00	WY	Jacque Finn 100-yard interception run (Casey Brmalet rush failed)	BYU 28-23
4	9:10	WY	Derek Armah 3-yard run (Malcolm Floyd pass)	WY 31-28
4	3:28	BYU	Gabriel Reid 4-yard pass from Matt Berry (Matt Payne kick)	BYU 35-31

=== New Mexico ===
Team	1	2	3	4	Total
• New Mexico	0	14	0	6	20
BYU	10	3	3	0	16

- Date: November 16
- Location: LaVell Edwards Stadium, Provo, UT
- Game start: 4:07 p.m. MST
- Elapsed time: 3:16
- Game attendance: 60,764
- Game weather: 52 °F (11 °C), high thin clouds, no wind
- Referee: Clair Gausman
- TV announcers (SportsWest): Tom Kirkland, Blaine Fowler

Scoring summary
1	7:05	BYU	Jon Burbidge 80-yard interception return (Matt Payne kick)	BYU 7-0
1	0:15	BYU	Matt Payne 32-yard field goal	BYU 10-0
2	12:00	UNM	Dontrell Moore 1-yard run (Kenny Byrd kick)	BYU 10-7
2	2:52	UNM	Dwight Counter 7-yard pass from Casey Kelly (Kenny Byrd kick)	UNM 14-10
2	0:27	BYU	Matt Payne 52-yard field goal	UNM 14-13
3	6:20	BYU	Matt Payne 37-yard field goal	BYU 16-14
4	7:59	UNM	Dontrell Moore 2-yard run (Moore rush failed)	UNM 20-16

=== Utah ===
Team	1	2	3	4	Total
BYU	3	3	0	0	6
• Utah	0	0	10	3	13

- Date: November 23
- Location: Rice-Eccles Stadium, Salt Lake City, UT
- Game start: 1:06 p.m. MST
- Elapsed time: 3:02
- Game attendance: 45,167
- Game weather: 47 °F (8 °C), Partly cloudy & Hazy, winds N 5 mph (8.0 km/h)
- Referee: Ken Rivera
- TV announcers (ESPN+): Gary Bender, JC Pearson, Beth Mowins

Scoring summary
1	9:34	BYU	Matt Payne 30-yard field goal	BYU 3-0
2	10:20	BYU	Matt Payne 48-yard field goal	BYU 6-0
3	7:50	UTAH	Bryan Borreson 31-yard field goal	BYU 6-3
3	3:03	UTAH	Brand Warfield 4-yard run (Bryan Borreson kick)	UTAH 10-6
4	7:09	UTAH	Bryan Borreson 22-yard field goal	UTAH 13-6

== Roster ==
2002 BYU Cougars football team roster
Players
Coaches
Offense

Pos.	#	Name	Class
WR	85	Justin Anderson	Sr
G	64	Ben Archibald	Sr
QB	8	Matt Berry	Fr
WR	2	David Christensen	Jr
WR	80	Toby Christensen	Jr
QB	13	Bret Engemann	Sr
OL	64	Scott Jackson	Jr
WR	20	Reno Mahe	Sr
TE	89	Spencer Nead	Sr
G	75	Scott Young	Jr

Defense

Pos.	#	Name	Class
LB	46	Colby Bockwoldt	Jr
DE	92	John Denney	So
SS	33	Aaron Francisco	So
DL	56	Shaun Nua	So
LB	49	Brady Poppinga	So
DB	25	Mike Sumko	Sr

Special teams

Pos.	#	Name	Class

Head coach

- Gary Crowton

Coordinators/assistant coaches

Legend

- (C) Team captain
- (S) Suspended
- (I) Ineligible
- Injured
- Redshirt

Roster
