= 2002 San Diego State Aztecs football team =

American college football season

2002 San Diego State Aztecs football
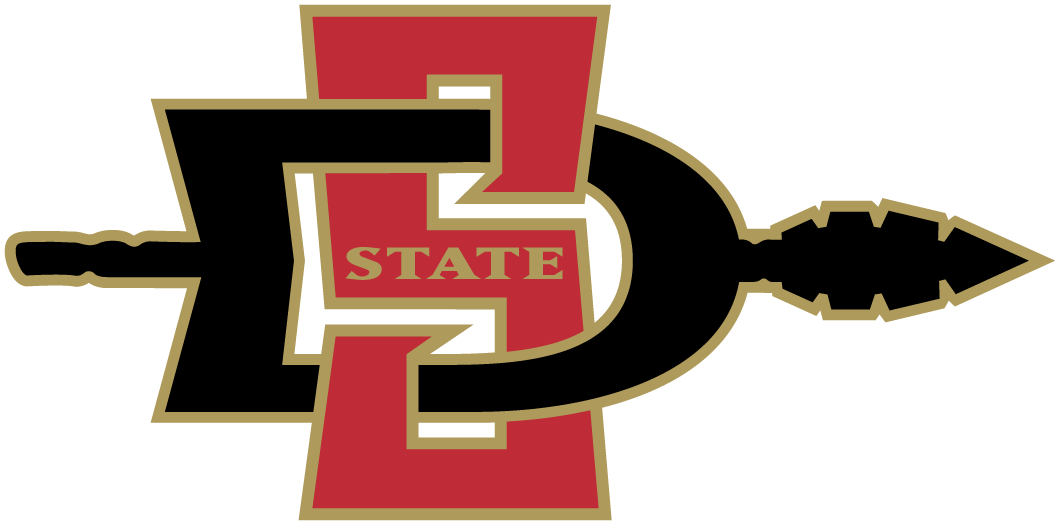
- Conference: Mountain West Conference
- Record: 4–9 (4–3 MW)
- Head coach: Tom Craft (1st season)
- Offensive scheme: Spread
- Defensive coordinator: Thom Kaumeyer (1st season)
- Base defense: 4–3
- Home stadium: Qualcomm Stadium

2002 Mountain West Conference football standings
	Conf.			Overall
Team	W		L	W		L
Colorado State $	6	–	1	10	–	4
New Mexico	5	–	2	7	–	7
Air Force	4	–	3	8	–	5
San Diego State	4	–	3	4	–	9
Utah	3	–	4	5	–	6
UNLV	3	–	4	5	–	7
BYU	2	–	5	5	–	7
Wyoming	1	–	6	2	–	10
$ – Conference champion; Rankings from AP Poll

The 2002 San Diego State Aztecs football team represented San Diego State University in the 2002 NCAA Division I-A football season. They were coached by Tom Craft and played their home games at Qualcomm Stadium.

The Aztecs finished the season with a 4–9 record.

== Schedule ==
Date	Time	Opponent	Site	TV	Result	Attendance
August 29	7:00 pm	at Fresno State*	Bulldog Stadium; Fresno, CA (rivalry)	ESPN2	L 14–16	39,111
September 7	4:00 pm	at No. 17 Colorado*	Folsom Field; Boulder, CO	FSN	L 14–34	44,126
September 14	7:00 pm	Arizona State*	Qualcomm Stadium; San Diego, CA	AZTV	L 28–39	29,041
September 21	2:00 pm	at Idaho*	Kibbie Dome; Moscow, ID		L 38–48	14,887
September 28	11:00 am	UCLA*	Qualcomm Stadium; San Diego, CA	ESPN2	L 7–43	33,610
October 12	4:00 pm	Utah	Qualcomm Stadium; San Diego, CA		W 36–17	20,410
October 19	12:00 pm	at Wyoming	War Memorial Stadium; Laramie, WY		W 24–20	13,757
October 26	4:00 pm	UNLV	Qualcomm Stadium; San Diego, CA		W 31–21	21,541
November 2	12:00 pm	at BYU	LaVell Edwards Stadium; Provo, UT	ESPN Plus	L 10–34	59,362
November 9	3:00 pm	at New Mexico	University Stadium; Albuquerque, NM	SPW	L 8–15	28,770
November 16	4:00 pm	No. 21 Colorado State	Qualcomm Stadium; San Diego, CA	SPW	L 21–49	21,714
November 23	9:00 am	at Air Force	Falcon Stadium; Colorado Springs, CO	ESPN2	W 38–34	31,023
December 7	8:00 pm	at Hawaii	Aloha Stadium; Halawa, HI		L 40–41	36,671
*Non-conference game; Rankings from AP Poll released prior to the game; All times are in Pacific time
