= Skyline High School (Colorado) =

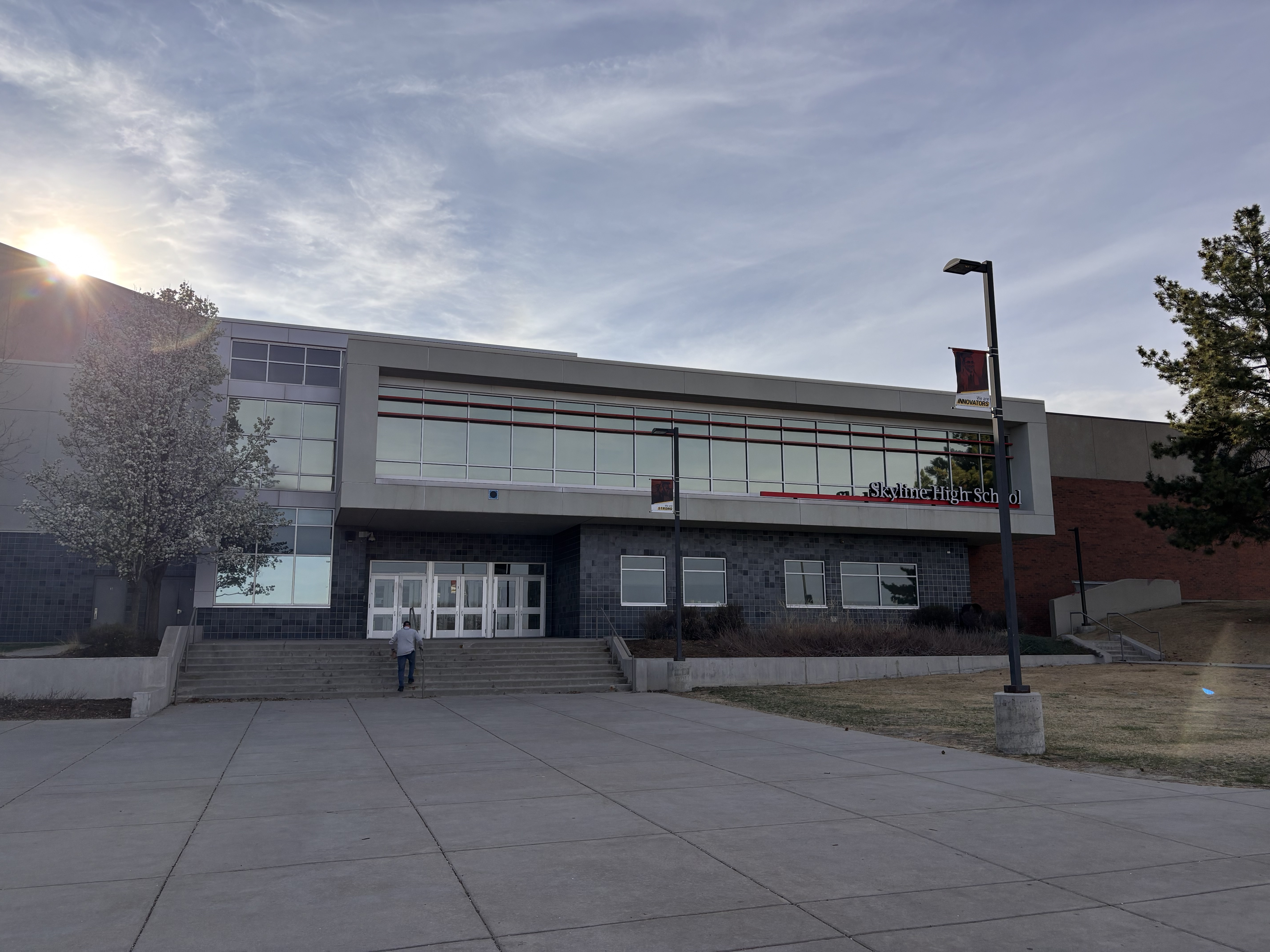
- Exterior of school entrance in March 2026.

Location
- 600 East Mountain View Avenue; Longmont, Colorado 80504; United States; 40°10′57″N 105°4′53″W

Information
- School type: Public high school
- Established: 1978; 48 years ago
- School district: St. Vrain Valley RE-1J
- CEEB code: 060938
- NCES School ID: 080537001284
- Principal: Anthony Barela
- Teaching staff: 58.50 (on an FTE basis)
- Grades: 9–12
- Gender: Coeducational
- Enrollment: 1,082 (2024–25)
- Student to teacher ratio: 18.50
- Campus type: Suburban
- Colors: Red, gold, and white
- Athletics: CHSAA
- Athletics conference: Granite Peaks
- Mascot: Falcon
- Feeder schools: Timberline PK–8; Trail Ridge Middle School
- Website: shs.svvsd.org

Skyline High School is a public high school in Longmont, Colorado. Part of the St. Vrain Valley School District, the school enrolled 1,082 students in the 2024–25 academic year.

== Academics ==
=== Enrollment ===
In the 2024–25 academic year, Skyline High School enrolled 1,082 students in the ninth through twelfth grades and employed 58.50 classroom teachers (on a full-time equivalent basis), for a student-to-teacher ratio of 18.50. Students matriculate to the school from Timberline PK–8 and Trail Ridge Middle School, which in turn receive students from four area elementary schools. Skyline High School's attendance boundaries encompass the eastern part of Longmont, north of St. Vrain Creek and east of Main Street (US 287).

== Demographics ==
The demographic breakdown of the 1,082 students attending during the 2024-2025 school year:

- American Indian/Alaska Native: 0.55%
- Asian: 1.02%
- Native Hawaiian/Pacific Islander: 0.09%
- Hispanic: 69.04%
- Black: 1.2%
- White: 25.14%
- Two or more races: 2.96%

(Percentages may not add to 100% due to rounding)

== Extracurricular activities ==
=== Athletics ===
Skyline High School competes in the Granite Peaks league of the Colorado High School Activities Association (CHSAA). Their mascot is a falcon, and their team colors are red, gold, and white.

== Notable alumni ==
- J. J. Raterink, Arena Football League player
- Kristen Schaal, actress and comedian
- JD Smith (born Joshua Seefried), founder of OutServe
