= Anthony Schlegel =

American football player and coach (born 1981)

Ohio State Buckeyes
- Title: Assistant strength and conditioning coach

Personal information
- Born: March 1, 1981 (age 45); Cedar Rapids, Iowa, U.S.
- Listed height: 6 ft 0 in (1.83 m)
- Listed weight: 251 lb (114 kg)

Career information
- High school: Highland Park (University Park, Texas)
- College: Air Force; Ohio State
- NFL draft: 2006: 3rd round, 76th overall pick

Career history

Playing
- New York Jets (2006); Cincinnati Bengals (2007); Florida Tuskers (2009–2010)

Coaching
- Ohio State (2011–2015) Assistant strength and conditioning coach; Jacksonville Jaguars (2021) Head strength and conditioning coach; Ohio State (2024) Interim assistant strength and conditioning coach; Ohio State (2026–present) Associate director of strength and conditioning

Awards and highlights
- First-team All-MW (2002)

Career NFL statistics
- Total tackles: 38
- Stats at Pro Football Reference

Anthony Schlegel (born March 1, 1981) is an American former professional football player who was a linebacker in the National Football League (NFL). Schlegel played college football for the Ohio State Buckeyes after transferring from the United States Air Force Academy and was selected by the New York Jets in the third round of the 2006 NFL draft. He was also a member of the Cincinnati Bengals of the NFL and the Florida Tuskers of the United Football League (UFL).

In January 2011, Schlegel returned to his college alma mater as an assistant strength and conditioning coach for the Buckeyes. He was also the head strength and conditioning coach for the Jacksonville Jaguars in 2021.

== Early life ==
Schlegel attended Highland Park High School. He was a state champion in high school wrestling.

== College career ==
Schlegel began his college career at the United States Air Force Academy but transferred to Ohio State University after his sophomore season. While at the Academy, Schlegel served as the team's co-captain, earning all-conference honors. During his 2004 season, he was ranked third in the Ohio State defense with 84 tackles and in 2005 he was ranked second with 82 tackles.

== Professional career ==
Pre-draft measurables
Height	Weight	Arm length	Hand span	40-yard dash	10-yard split	20-yard split	20-yard shuttle	Three-cone drill	Vertical jump	Broad jump	Bench press
6 ft 0 1/2 in (1.84 m)	250 lb (113 kg)	29 3/8 in (0.75 m)	8 5/8 in (0.22 m)	4.86 s	1.69 s	2.83 s	4.38 s	7.41 s	32.0 in (0.81 m)	9 ft 3 in (2.82 m)	21 reps
All values from NFL Combine

=== New York Jets ===
Schlegel was selected by the New York Jets in the third round (76th overall) of the 2006 NFL draft. He made his debut at the Chicago Bears on November 19. On September 1, 2007 the Jets released him.

=== Cincinnati Bengals ===
On September 2, 2007, Schlegel was signed by the Bengals. He made his Bengals debut versus the New England Patriots on October 1 and made three tackles. On May 1, 2008, the Bengals released him.

=== Florida Tuskers ===
Schlegel was selected by the Florida Tuskers on the UFL Premiere Season Draft in 2009 and signed with the team on September 3. He played for the Tuskers through the 2010 season.

== Coaching career ==
=== Ohio State (first stint) ===
Following the end of his playing career, Schlegel was hired by his alma mater, Ohio State, as an assistant strength and conditioning coach in January 2011. On September 27, 2014, he received media attention for body slamming a fan who ran onto the field.

=== Jacksonville Jaguars ===
On January 18, 2021, Schlegel was hired by the Jacksonville Jaguars as their head strength and conditioning coach, reuniting with head coach Urban Meyer.

=== Ohio State (second stint) ===
Following a two season absence from coaching, Schelegel was rehired by Ohio State on an interim basis to be an assistant strength and conditioning coach.

=== Ohio State (third stint) ===
Schelegel returned to the Buckeyes on a full-time basis in January 2026 as a strength and conditioning coach.

== Personal life ==
Schlegel founded his own fitness company, Schlegel Hardcore Elite Training.

In 2020, he became a morning radio host on WBNS-FM, 97.1 The Fan with fellow Ohio State linebacker Bobby Carpenter.
