= Ed Kezirian =

Biographical details
- Born: August 4, 1952 (age 74); Fresno, California, U.S.
- Education: Reedley Junior College; University of California, Los Angeles (1975)

Playing career
- 1970–1971: Reedley
- 1972–1973: UCLA
- 1974–1975: Southern California Sun
- Position: Tackle

Coaching career (HC unless noted)
- 1976–1977: UCLA (GA)
- 1978–1980: Hawaii (ST/TE/OT)
- 1981: Hawaii (ST/OL)
- 1982–1988: UCLA (TE/OT)
- 1989: UCLA (OG/C)
- 1990–1992: UCLA (OL)
- 2002: UCLA (interim HC)

Head coaching record
- Overall: 1–0
- Bowls: 1–0

Ed Kezirian (born August 4, 1952) an American athletic administrator who was the interim head coach of the UCLA Bruins football team for one game. Kezirian worked as the Football Academic Coordinator at University of California, Los Angeles, and became known for waving a towel on the sidelines to inspire the fans during football games. "Coach K", as he is more affectionately known, retired from UCLA after the 2007 season and moved back to Central California.

== High school ==
Kezirian was born in Fresno, California on August 4, 1952. Kezirian attended Central High School in Fresno, where he was on the football team.

== Personal life and college career ==
Kezirian spent two seasons at Reedley College in Reedley, California before transferring to UCLA in 1973. Kezirian was named to the 1973 All-Coast/Conference First Team. He was part of coach Pepper Rodgers' offensive line at the time. His son, Blane, also played football for UCLA as a tight end and on special teams.

== Coaching career ==
Kezirian was an offensive line coach under Terry Donahue and Bob Toledo. When Toledo was fired on December 10, 2002, Kezirian became the interim head coach for the game against the New Mexico Lobos in the Las Vegas Bowl on December 25, 2002. He was victorious in his only game as Bruin head coach; UCLA won 27–13. During the game, Katie Hnida became the first woman to play in a Division I-A college football game.

After the game, Kezirian retired from coaching and was replaced by Karl Dorrell. He remained on the staff to continue overseeing academics for the UCLA Bruins. He is a member of the 2022 class of the UCLA Athletics Hall of Fame.

== Head coaching record ==
Year	Team	Overall	Conference	Standing	Bowl/playoffs
UCLA Bruins (Pacific-10 Conference) (2002)
2002	UCLA	1–0	0–0		W Las Vegas
UCLA:		1–0	0–0		
Total:		1–0			
