= 2002 UNLV Rebels football team =

American college football season

2002 UNLV Rebels football
- Conference: Mountain West Conference
- Record: 5–7 (3–4 MW)
- Head coach: John Robinson (4th season)
- Offensive coordinator: Rob Boras (2nd season)
- Defensive coordinator: Mike Bradeson (3rd season)
- Home stadium: Sam Boyd Stadium

2002 Mountain West Conference football standings
| | Conf. | | | Overall |
| Team | W | | L | W | | L |
|---|---|---|---|---|---|---|
| Colorado State $ | 6 | – | 1 | 10 | – | 4 |
| New Mexico | 5 | – | 2 | 7 | – | 7 |
| Air Force | 4 | – | 3 | 8 | – | 5 |
| San Diego State | 4 | – | 3 | 4 | – | 9 |
| Utah | 3 | – | 4 | 5 | – | 6 |
| UNLV | 3 | – | 4 | 5 | – | 7 |
| BYU | 2 | – | 5 | 5 | – | 7 |
| Wyoming | 1 | – | 6 | 2 | – | 10 |
$ – Conference champion; Rankings from AP Poll

The 2002 UNLV Rebels football team represented the University of Nevada, Las Vegas (UNLV) as a member of the Mountain West Conference (MW) during the 2002 NCAA Division I-A football season. Led by fourth-year head coach John Robinson, the Rebels compiled an overall record of 5–7 record with mark of 3–4 in conference play, tying for fifth place in the MW. The team played home games at Sam Boyd Stadium in Whitney, Nevada.

== Schedule ==
| Date | Time | Opponent | Site | TV | Result | Attendance |
|---|---|---|---|---|---|---|
| August 31 | 5:45 p.m. | Wisconsin* | Sam Boyd Stadium; Whitney, NV | ESPN2 | L 7–27 | 42,075 |
| September 7 | 7:00 p.m. | Kansas* | Sam Boyd Stadium; Whitney, NV | | W 31–20 | 25,109 |
| September 14 | 4:00 p.m. | at Oregon State* | Reser Stadium; Corvallis, OR | TBS | L 17–47 | 36,121 |
| September 21 | 4:00 p.m. | at Toledo* | Glass Bowl; Toledo, OH | ESPN Plus | L 21–38 | 26,050 |
| October 5 | 7:00 p.m. | Nevada*^{†} | Sam Boyd Stadium; Whitney, NV (Fremont Cannon) | | W 21–17 | 28,341 |
| October 12 | 4:00 p.m. | New Mexico | Sam Boyd Stadium; Whitney, NV | | L 16–25 | 21,205 |
| October 19 | 4:00 p.m. | at BYU | LaVell Edwards Stadium; Provo, UT | SPW | W 24–3 | 62,543 |
| October 26 | 4:00 p.m. | at San Diego State | Qualcomm Stadium; San Diego, CA | | L 21–31 | 21,541 |
| November 2 | 4:00 p.m. | Wyoming | Sam Boyd Stadium; Whitney, NV | SPW | W 49–48 ^{OT} | 23,346 |
| November 9 | 4:00 p.m. | at Utah | Rice–Eccles Stadium; Salt Lake City, UT | | L 17–28 | 28,528 |
| November 16 | 12:00 p.m. | Air Force | Sam Boyd Stadium; Whitney, NV | ESPN Plus | L 32–49 | 25,417 |
| November 30 | 12:00 p.m. | at No. 16 Colorado State | Hughes Stadium; Fort Collins, CO | SPW | W 36–33 | 28,877 |
*Non-conference game; ^{†}Homecoming; Rankings from AP Poll released prior to the game; All times are in Pacific time
