= 2002 Liberty Bowl =

2002 AXA Liberty Bowl
- 44th Liberty Bowl
TCU Horned Frogs	Colorado State Rams
(9–2)	(10–3)
C-USA	Mountain West
17	3
Head coach: Gary Patterson	Head coach: Sonny Lubick
	AP / Coaches / BCS; 23 / 21 / NR
	1	2	3	4	Total
TCU	0	7	0	10	17
Colorado State	0	0	3	0	3
- Date: December 31, 2002
- Season: 2002
- Stadium: Liberty Bowl Memorial Stadium
- Location: Memphis, Tennessee
- MVP: LaTarence Dunbar (WR, TCU)
- Favorite: Colorado State by 3
- Referee: Dennis Hennigan (Big East)
- Attendance: 55,207

United States TV coverage
- Network: ESPN
- Announcers: Jeff Hullinger, Todd Christensen, Stacy Paetz

The 2002 Liberty Bowl was a college football postseason bowl game played on December 31, 2002, at Liberty Bowl Memorial Stadium in Memphis, Tennessee. The 44th edition of the Liberty Bowl matched the TCU Horned Frogs and the Colorado State Rams. The game was sponsored by the Axa Equitable Life Insurance Company and was branded as the AXA Liberty Bowl. TCU won, 17–3; the game was TCU's 500th victory in program history.
