= 2002 Las Vegas Bowl =

2002 SEGA Sports Las Vegas Bowl
- 11th Las Vegas Bowl
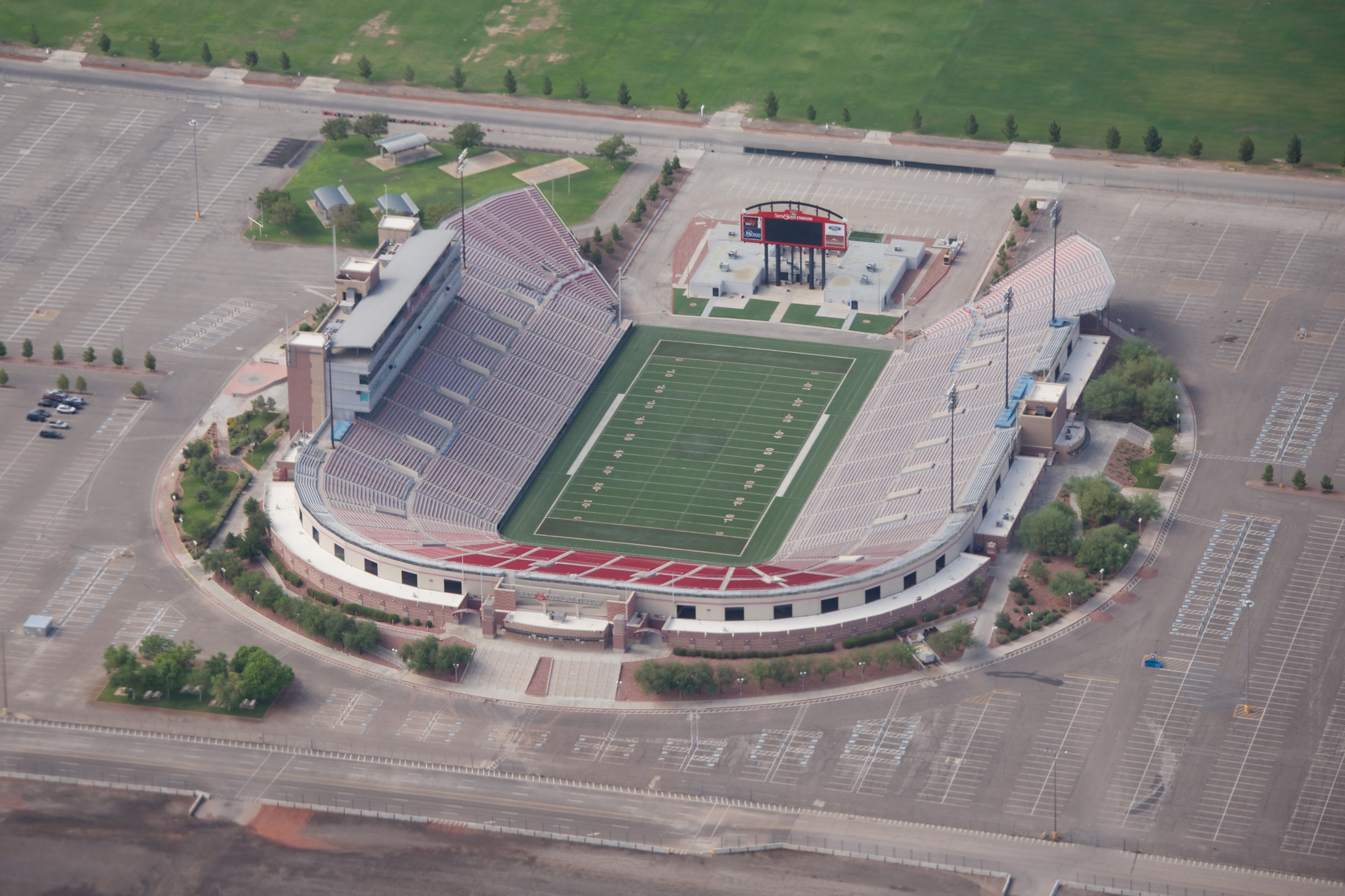
- Sam Boyd Stadium in Whitney, Nevada, hosted the Las Vegas Bowl.
New Mexico Lobos	UCLA Bruins
(7–6)	(7–5)
Mountain West	Pac-10
13	27
Head coach: Rocky Long	Head coach: Ed Kezirian (interim)
	1	2	3	4	Total
New Mexico	6	0	0	7	13
UCLA	3	3	7	14	27
- Date: December 25, 2002
- Season: 2002
- Stadium: Sam Boyd Stadium
- Location: Whitney, Nevada
- MVP: Craig Bragg (UCLA)
- Favorite: UCLA by 9.5
- Referee: Rogers Redding (SEC)
- Attendance: 30,324
- Payout: US$800,000 per team

United States TV coverage
- Network: ESPN
- Announcers: Mark Jones, Bob Davie, Mike Gottfried, Holly Rowe

The 2002 SEGA Sports Las Vegas Bowl was the 11th edition of the annual college football bowl game. It featured the New Mexico Lobos and the UCLA Bruins. The Bruins defeated the Lobos, 27–13.

Notably, the game was the first Division I-A college football game to have a female player on the field, Katie Hnida. Also, longtime UCLA assistant coach Ed Kezirian was victorious in his one and only appearance as a head coach. This was the second year in a row that the Las Vegas Bowl was held on Christmas Day.

== Game summary ==
UCLA scored first on a 49-yard field goal by Nate Fikse to take an early 3–0 lead. New Mexico's Desmar Black intercepted a UCLA pass, and returned it 55 yards for a touchdown. The extra point try was blocked, giving New Mexico a 6–3 lead. An interesting note from that game was that when New Mexico sent Katie Hnida out to kick the extra point, she became the first woman to play in a Division I-A college football game. Since the kick was blocked, UCLA was not the first team to be scored upon by a woman in a Division I-A game. Hnida would later successfully kick two extra points against Texas State in the fourth quarter of a 72–8 New Mexico win on August 30, 2003.

Fikse made a 39-yard field goal for the Bruins to tie it in the second quarter, and the score remained 6–6 at halftime.

Two minutes into the third quarter, UCLA's Craig Bragg scored on a 74-yard punt return, giving UCLA a 13–6 lead. In the fourth quarter, UCLA's Jarrad Page intercepted a New Mexico pass, and returned it 29 yards for a touchdown, putting UCLA up 20–6. A 1-yard Tyler Ebell score from 1 yard out increased the Bruins' lead to 27–6. New Mexico scored once more on an 11-yard touchdown pass from Casey Kelly to Joe Manning. Kenny Byrd kicked the extra point, making the final score 27–13.

=== Scoring ===
==== First Quarter ====
- UCLA — Nate Fikse, 49-yard field goal.
- New Mexico — Desmar Black, 55-yard interception return. Katie Hnida’s kick blocked.

==== Second Quarter ====
- UCLA — Fikse, 39-yard field goal.

==== Third Quarter ====
- UCLA — Craig Bragg, 74-yard punt return. Fikse converts.

==== Fourth Quarter ====
- UCLA — Jarrad Page, 29-yard interception return. Chris Griffith converts.
- UCLA — Tyler Ebell, one-yard run. Fikse converts.
- New Mexico — Joe Manning, 11-yard pass from Casey Kelly. Kenny Byrd converts.

== Ed Kezirian ==
Kezirian had become beloved at UCLA as the longtime offensive line coach for the program, serving under Terry Donahue and Bob Toledo. When Toledo was fired on December 10, 2002, Kezirian became the interim head coach and would serve in this capacity for the team's ensuing bowl game. The 27–13 result meant that "Coach K" was victorious in his only game as Bruin head coach.

== Aftermath ==
After the game, Kezirian retired from coaching undefeated and was replaced by Karl Dorrell as UCLA's head coach. He remained on the staff to continue overseeing academics for the Bruins football team. When Dorrell was fired in 2007, defensive coordinator DeWayne Walker took the interim coaching duty for the 2007 Las Vegas Bowl. The Bruins lost that game.

== Bibliography ==
- UCLA Football Media Guide (PDF Copy available at www.uclabruins.com)
- University of New Mexico Football Media Guide (PDF Copy available at golobos.cstv.com Archived 2009-02-26 at the Wayback Machine)
