= Rhett Nelson =

American football player (born 1980)

No. 38
- Position: Defensive back

Personal information
- Born: February 16, 1980 (age 46); Minneapolis, Minnesota, U.S.
- Listed height: 6 ft 0 in (1.83 m)
- Listed weight: 200 lb (91 kg)

Career information
- High school: Heritage (Littleton, Colorado)
- College: Colorado State
- NFL draft: 2003: undrafted

Career history
- Arizona Cardinals (2003)*; Minnesota Vikings (2003–2004); Arizona Cardinals (2005)*
- * Offseason or practice squad member only

Awards and highlights
- Second-team All-MW (2002)

Career NFL statistics
- Games played: 7
- Stats at Pro Football Reference

Rhett Van Nelson (born February 16, 1980) is an American former professional football player who was a defensive back for the Minnesota Vikings of the National Football League (NFL). He played college football for the Colorado State Rams.
