= Antwoine Sanders =

American gridiron football player (born 1977)

No. 27
- Position: Safety

Personal information
- Born: September 22, 1977 (age 49); Fayetteville, North Carolina, U.S.
- Listed height: 6 ft 2 in (1.88 m)
- Listed weight: 202 lb (92 kg)

Career information
- High school: Terry Sanford (Fayetteville)
- College: Utah
- NFL draft: 2003: 7th round, 258th overall pick

Career history
- 2003: Baltimore Ravens*
- 2004: Miami Dolphins*
- 2005: Hamilton Tiger-Cats
- * Offseason or practice squad member only

Awards and highlights
- First-team All-MW (2002); Second-team All-MW (2001)
- Stats at CFL.ca

Antwoine Sanders (born September 22, 1977) is an American former professional football safety. He was selected by the Baltimore Ravens in the seventh round of the 2003 NFL draft. He first enrolled at Independence Community College before transferring to Arizona Western College and later the University of Utah. Sanders was also a member of the Miami Dolphins. He also played for the Hamilton Tiger-Cats of the Canadian Football League.

== Early life ==
Antwoine Sanders was born on September 22, 1977, in Fayetteville, North Carolina. He attended Terry Sanford High School in Fayetteville and was a two-year letterman on the football team. He earned first-team all-conference and all-region honors in high school. He graduated from Terry Sanford High in 1996. He did not attempt to play college football until three years after high school.

== College career ==
Sanders first enrolled at Independence Community College but ended up transferring to Arizona Western College. He had to sit out his first season at Arizona Western. He was a starter at free safety in 2000, garnering first-team all-conference and all-region recognition.

Sanders was then a two-year letterman for the Utah Utes of the University of Utah from 2001 to 2002. He was a starter at free safety for the Utes in 2001, recording 48 solo tackles, 30 assisted tackles, four interceptions, and four pass breakups. He was named second-team All-Mountain West Conference for the 2001 season. He totaled 65 tackles, two interceptions, and six pass breakups in 2002, earning first-team All-Mountain West honors. Sanders skipped his senior year to enter the 2003 NFL draft, at the age of 25. He majored in sociology at Utah. He later graduated in 2018.

== Professional career ==
Sanders was selected by the Baltimore Ravens in the seventh round of the 2003 NFL draft. He officially signed with the team on July 15. He was waived with an injury settlement on August 11, 2003.

Sanders signed with the Miami Dolphins on January 8, 2004. He was waived on March 16, 2004.

He played in seven games for the Hamilton Tiger-Cats of the Canadian Football League in 2005, totaling ten defensive tackles, four special teams tackles, one interception, and one pass breakup.

== Personal life ==
Sanders' uncle Tim Morrison played in the NFL.
