= Dexter Wynn =

American football player (born 1981)

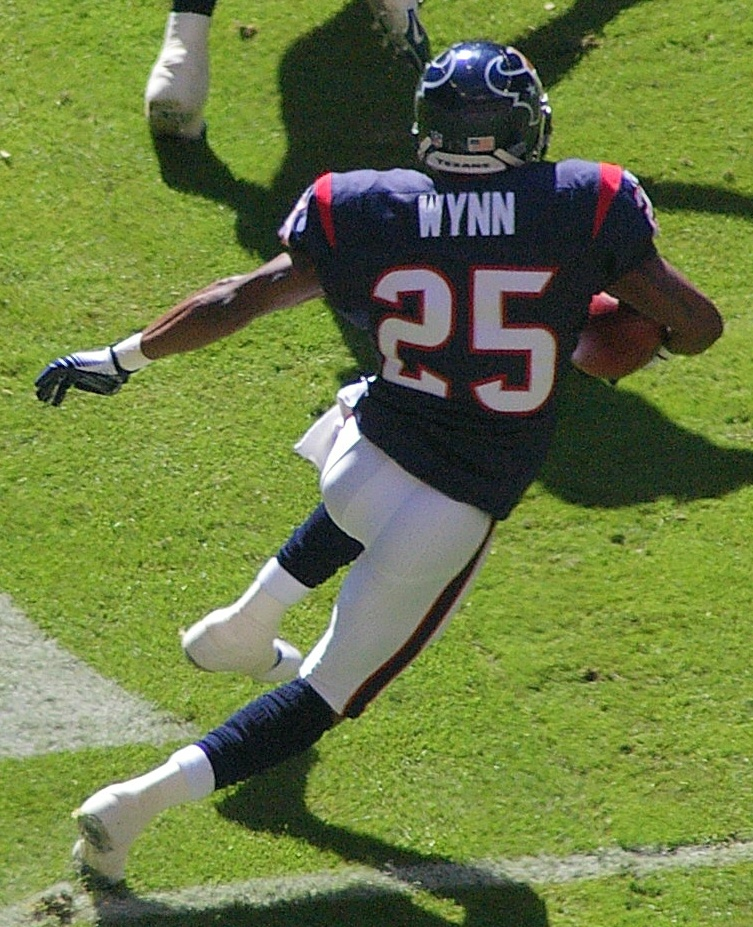
- Wynn with the Houston Texans in 2006

No. 31, 25, 30
- Position: Cornerback

Personal information
- Born: February 25, 1981 (age 45); Sumter, South Carolina, U.S.
- Listed height: 5 ft 9 in (1.75 m)
- Listed weight: 175 lb (79 kg)

Career information
- High school: Rampart (Colorado Springs, Colorado)
- College: Colorado State
- NFL draft: 2004: 6th round, 192nd overall pick

Career history
- Philadelphia Eagles (2004–2006); Houston Texans (2006–2007); Detroit Lions (2008)

Awards and highlights
- 2× First-team All-MW (2002, 2003); Second-team All-MW (2001)

Career NFL statistics
- Total tackles: 52
- Fumble recoveries: 5
- Pass deflections: 13
- Stats at Pro Football Reference

Dexter Maurice Wynn (born February 25, 1981) is an American former professional football player who was a cornerback in the National Football League (NFL). He was selected by the Philadelphia Eagles in the sixth round of the 2004 NFL draft. He played college football for the Colorado State Rams.

Wynn was also a member of the Houston Texans and Detroit Lions.

== Early life ==
Dexter played high school football at Rampart High School in Colorado Springs, as a wide receiver and cornerback. He led the Rams to the 1998 State Championship (14–0), earning Colorado Springs Metro League Player of the Year honors, and USA Today's Colorado Player of the Year. In the State Championship game he accounted for all five of his team's scores, and intercepted a pass in the end zone to seal the victory, earning a spot in Sports Illustrated's "Faces in the Crowd".

== College career ==
From 2000 to 2003, Dexter was a standout performer at Colorado State University earning All-Conference honors at both cornerback and return specialist from 2001 to 2003. Dexter holds the season record for Colorado State kickoff return average.

== Professional career ==
Pre-draft measurables
Height	Weight	Arm length	Hand span	20-yard shuttle	Three-cone drill	Vertical jump	Broad jump	Bench press
5 ft 9 1/4 in (1.76 m)	175 lb (79 kg)	28 7/8 in (0.73 m)	8 1/4 in (0.21 m)	3.90 s	6.70 s	39.0 in (0.99 m)	10 ft 3 in (3.12 m)	13 reps
All values from NFL Combine

=== Philadelphia Eagles ===
Wynn was selected in the sixth round of the 2004 NFL draft with the 192nd overall pick. Wynn spent all of 2004 and 2005 with the Philadelphia Eagles as a backup cornerback and kick returner. In 2006, he was initially cut at the beginning of the season and re-signed after injuries to the Eagles defensive backfield. He appeared in 28 games as an Eagle.

=== Houston Texans ===
In November 2006, Wynn was waived by Philadelphia and claimed by the Houston Texans following the Eagles' signing of William James. He was released on August 29, 2008.

=== Detroit Lions ===
Wynn was signed by the Detroit Lions on December 9, 2008, after the team waived cornerback Brian Kelly. He was placed on injured reserve on August 31, and was not retained for the 2010 season.
