= Albert Bimper =

American football player (born 1983)

Profile
- Position: Center

Personal information
- Born: July 26, 1983 (age 43); Dallas, Texas, U.S.

Career information
- College: Colorado State

Career history
- 2006: Indianapolis Colts*
- * Offseason or practice squad member only

Albert Bimper (born July 26, 1983) is the executive dean of the College of Liberal Arts and Social Sciences at the University of North Texas in Denton, Texas.

== Biography ==
Bimper previously served as Assistant Professor of Student Affairs at Kansas State University in Manhattan, Kansas. He completed his PhD studies at The University of Texas at Austin. Bimper is an American former football center for the Indianapolis Colts of the National Football League and holds a B.S. from Colorado State University and a M.S. from Purdue University.

Bimper played college football for the Colorado State Rams as a center. He earned three varsity letters at Colorado State and Mountain West Conference honorable mention. He missed four games his senior year due to injuries.
