= Gerald Abraham (American football) =

American football player (born 1965)

Profile
- Positions: Running back, fullback & Wide receiver/linebacker

Personal information
- Born: July 4, 1965 (age 61); Denver, Colorado, U.S.
- Listed height: 6 ft 2 in (1.88 m)
- Listed weight: 220 lb (100 kg)

Career information
- College: Wyoming
- NFL draft: 1988: undrafted

Career history
- Denver Broncos (1988)*; Philadelphia Eagles (1988)*; Kansas City Chiefs (1989)*; Denver Dynamite (1991)
- * Offseason or practice squad member only

Awards and highlights
- First-team All-WAC (1987)

Career AFL statistics
- Receptions: 11
- Receiving yards: 169
- Receiving touchdowns: 4
- Tackles: 22
- Interceptions: 2
- Stats at ArenaFan.com

Gerald Abraham (born July 4, 1965) is an American former football player who played running back & fullback professionally for the Denver Broncos, Philadelphia Eagles & Kansas City Chiefs of the NFL, as well as wide receiver/linebacker for the Denver Dynamite of the Arena Football League. He played college football at Wyoming

At Wyoming, Abraham played fullback and running back and was Wyoming's all-time leading rusher at the time.

In 1991, Abraham was named to the active roster of the Denver Dynamite. He played wide receiver/linebacker.

Abraham is currently the program director for the Denver PAL
