= Brian Lee (American football) =

American football player (born 1975)

No. 94
- Position: Defensive back

Personal information
- Born: January 23, 1975 (age 51); Arvada, Colorado, U.S.

Career information
- College: University of Wyoming

Career history
- 1994–1997: Wyoming Cowboys

Awards and highlights
- Consensus All-American (1997)

Brian J. Lee (born January 23, 1975) is an American former college football player. He played at the defensive back position for the University of Wyoming Cowboys football team from 1994 to 1997 and led the NCAA with eight interceptions in 1997. He was also a consensus first-team selection to the 1997 College Football All-America Team. He was also a first-team Academic All-American in 1997. In 2008, Lee was inducted into the University of Wyoming's Athletic Hall of Fame. After graduating from Wyoming, Lee became a middle school teacher in Littleton, Colorado.
