= Brett Smith =

American gridiron football player (born 1992)

No. 16
- Position: Quarterback

Personal information
- Born: June 8, 1992 (age 34); Salem, Oregon, U.S.
- Listed height: 6 ft 3 in (1.91 m)
- Listed weight: 205 lb (93 kg)

Career information
- High school: West Salem (OR)
- College: Wyoming
- NFL draft: 2014: undrafted

Career history
- Tampa Bay Buccaneers (2014)*; Toronto Argonauts (2014)*; San Jose SaberCats (2015)*; Saskatchewan Roughriders (2015); Ottawa Redblacks (2016)*; Edmonton Eskimos (2017)*
- * Offseason or practice squad member only

Awards and highlights
- MW Freshman of the Year (2011)

Career CFL statistics
- Comp. / Att.: 142 / 224
- Passing yards: 1,822
- TD–INT: 15–9
- Rushing yards: 444
- Rushing TD: 3
- Stats at CFL.ca
- Stats at Pro Football Reference

Brett Smith (born June 8, 1992) is an American former professional football quarterback. He played college football at Wyoming.

== Early life ==
Smith attended West Salem High School. During his senior year, Smith completed 65.7% of his passes for 2,146 yards and 27 touchdowns with five interceptions. He rushed for 855 yards on only 115 carries for 22 rushing touchdowns. He was named the First-team All-state for class 6A. In 2010, he was the Gatorade Football Player of the Year. He was ranked number 8 in all of the state of Oregon.

== College career ==
Smith attended the University of Wyoming from 2011 to 2013. During his career, he started 35 games, throwing for 8,834 yards with 76 touchdowns and 28 interceptions. He also rushed for 1,529 yards with 20 touchdowns.

During his freshman year, he averaged 256.3 yards in total offense per game. He was ranked number 2 in the Mountain West (MW) and ranked 33 in the NCAA. He was ranked fourth in the MW and 61st in the nation on passing yards, with 201.7 passing yards a game. He had a 124.6 passer rating, with that he was ranked 4th in the MW for passing efficiency. He had two receptions for 17 yards and one touchdown. He had 2 tackles for the year. He was first-team All-American freshman.

In his sophomore year, he finished the season with 174 pass attempts and no interceptions; this was the second-best mark in MW history. He finished second in the MW Conference and 16th nationally in total offense yards, with 308.5 yards per game. He placed 21st in passing yards per game, with 284 yards. He averaged 13.8 yards per complete pass. He completed sixty percent of his passes, and threw for 27 touchdowns with only 6 interceptions. He was named Mountain West Conference player of the week three times. He sustained one reception for 10 yards, and only one tackle. During this year he was nominated for the Manning Award.

In his junior year, he was one of the top returning quarterbacks in the nation and was a leading All-American candidate in 2013. He was ranked among the top 25 quarterbacks in the NCAA in multiple categories. Smith entered the 2014 NFL draft after his junior season.

=== Wyoming football records ===
- Career Offensive Yards: 10,390 (2011–2013)
- Career Touchdowns: 97 (2011–2013)
- Career Passing Touchdowns: 76 (2011–2013)
- Most Total Yards in a Game: 640 (November 23, 2013, against Hawaii Rainbow Warriors football) (Also a Mountain West Conference record)

== Professional career ==
Pre-draft measurables
Height	Weight	Arm length	Hand span	Wingspan	40-yard dash	10-yard split	20-yard split	20-yard shuttle	Three-cone drill	Vertical jump	Broad jump	Bench press
6 ft 1 3/8 in (1.86 m)	205 lb (93 kg)	30 1/2 in (0.77 m)	10 in (0.25 m)	6 ft 1 in (1.85 m)	4.59 s	1.61 s	2.71 s	4.18 s	6.98 s	31.0 in (0.79 m)	10 ft 8 in (3.25 m)	18 reps
All values from Pro Day

Leading up to the 2014 NFL draft, the NFL.com scouts gave him a rating of a 5.1. His main strength was considered to be his good-sized hands, a broad jump of 10'8", his speed for being a quarterback, and being a team captain for two years. His weaknesses included: his size (6'1"), throwing off balance, wobbly throws, and he needed to adapt patience to be able to play at the pro level. He was projected to be a seventh round pick. In the actual 2014 NFL Draft, he went undrafted.

=== Tampa Bay Buccaneers ===
Shortly after the draft concluded, Smith was signed by the Tampa Bay Buccaneers to compete with Mike Kafka, Alex Tanney and Mike Glennon for the backup position behind Josh McCown. This reunited him with college teammate Robert Herron, who was drafted in the sixth round of the 2014 NFL Draft. It also reunited him with quarterbacks coach Marcus Arroyo who recruited Smith to Wyoming. He was cut on May 21, 2014.

=== Toronto Argonauts ===
On July 21, 2014, Smith was signed by the Toronto Argonauts of the Canadian Football League, where he was the team's fifth-string quarterback. He was later released on September 6, 2014, along with fellow quarterback Casey Pachall.

=== San Jose SaberCats ===
On October 27, 2014, Smith was assigned to the San Jose SaberCats of the Arena Football League.

=== Saskatchewan Roughriders ===
On March 12, 2015, Smith was signed by the Saskatchewan Roughriders of the Canadian Football League. Smith began the 2015 CFL season as the #3 QB on the depth chart, however, after injuries to starter Darian Durant and backup Kevin Glenn, Smith became the starting quarterback for the Roughriders (at which time their record was 0–5). Brett made his first CFL start against the Edmonton Eskimos on July 31, 2015. Smith would finish the season having completed 142 of 224 pass attempts (63.4%) for 1,822 yards with 15 touchdowns and 9 interceptions. Smith entered the 2016 season as the number two quarterback on the roster behind Darian Durant. Nevertheless, following a poor preseason campaign he was released by the Riders on June 19, 2016.

=== Ottawa Redblacks ===
On July 4, 2016, Smith was signed to a practice roster agreement with the Ottawa Redblacks (CFL). Smith did not make an appearance with the Redblacks in his lone season with the club, and was let go prior to the Redblacks winning the 104th Grey Cup.

=== Edmonton Eskimos ===
On January 27, 2017, Smith signed with the Edmonton Eskimos (CFL). He was released during training camp on June 4, 2017.
