= Josh Wallwork =

American football quarterback

No. 7
- Position: Quarterback

Personal information
- Born: June 29, 1974 (age 52); Tracy, California, U.S.
- Listed height: 6 ft 3 in (1.91 m)
- Listed weight: 220 lb (100 kg)

Career information
- High school: Tracy (CA)
- College: Gavilan College (1994); Wyoming (1995–1996)

Career history
- Tampa Bay Storm (1999)

Awards and highlights
- NCAA passing yards leader (1996); NCAA total offense leader (1996)

Josh Wallwork (born June 29, 1974) is an American former college football player. He attended Tracy High School in Tracy, California, and played college football for Gavilan College in Gilroy, California, before transferring to the University of Wyoming in 1995. He played for Joe Tiller's Wyoming Cowboys football team in 1995 and 1996. As a senior in 1996, he led all NCAA major college players in several statistical categories, including total offense yards (4,209), total offense per game (350.8), passing yards (4,090), and pass completions (286). His passing efficieny rating of 154.7 in 1996 was third highest among major-college players.

Wallwork later played in five games for the Tampa Bay Storm of the Arena Football League in 1999 but did not attempt any passes.

== See also ==
- List of NCAA major college football yearly passing leaders
- List of NCAA major college football yearly total offense leaders
