= Corey Bramlet =

American football player (born 1983)

Profile
- Position: Quarterback

Personal information
- Born: January 17, 1983 (age 43); Wheatland, Wyoming, U.S.
- Listed height: 6 ft 4 in (1.93 m)
- Listed weight: 200 lb (91 kg)

Career information
- High school: Wheatland (WY)
- College: Wyoming
- NFL draft: 2006: undrafted

Career history
- New England Patriots (2006)*; Amsterdam Admirals (2007)
- * Offseason or practice squad member only

Corey Bramlet (born January 17, 1983) is an American former football quarterback. He was signed by the New England Patriots as an undrafted free agent in 2006. He played college football at Wyoming.

Bramlet has also played for the Amsterdam Admirals.

== Early life ==
Bramlet was an All-State and All-Conference performer as a junior and a senior at Wheatland High School. He was once named to the Casper Star-Tribune's Super 25. As a junior, he was 104 of 189 for over 1,500 yards and 12 touchdowns in eight games played. As a senior, he completed 94 of 203 passes for 1,553 yards and 15 touchdowns in six games, including 766 yards passing in his last two games. He broke his brother Casey's records for single-game completions, attempts and yards when he completed 29 of 56 passes for 467 yards against Rawlins as a senior. He was also an outstanding basketball player and holds the Wheatland High School track and field record in the discus. In addition to Wyoming, he was recruited by Colorado State, Colorado, Montana State and Montana.

== College career ==
Redshirted as freshman, Bramlet was on the Wyoming Cowboys roster as backup quarterback behind his elder brother Casey. He took over the helm in 2004 and led the team to a win in the Las Vegas Bowl over UCLA by a score of 24 to 21, helping the Cowboys to their first bowl victory in 38 years. He received Honorable Mention All-Mountain West Conference in 2004, ranking third in the MWC in both total offense (218.2 yards per game) and passing efficiency (123.0 rating). As a junior, he recorded seven 200-yard passing games and had eight games in which he accumulated 200 or more yards of total offense. He set his career high for passing yards (307) in the 2004 Pioneer PureVision Las Vegas Bowl win over UCLA for which he gained the bowls MVP honors. In his senior year, he posted 214 completed passes out of 359 attempts for a total of 2,610 yards with 16 touchdowns and 18 interceptions.

== Professional career ==
=== 2006 ===
Went undrafted in the 2006 NFL Draft and was signed by the New England Patriots as a free agent, but was cut after training camp.

=== 2007 ===
Signed with the Amsterdam Admirals where he began the season as a backup quarterback to Drew Olson. He received his first action in Week 5 against the Hamburg Sea Devils and his brother Casey, after an injury to Olsen knocked him out of the game.

== Personal ==
Bramlet is the son of Jill and Tom Bramlet. He has two brothers, Casey and Connor. His father also played football for Wyoming, as did his older brother Casey.
