= Erik Pears =

American football player (born 1982)

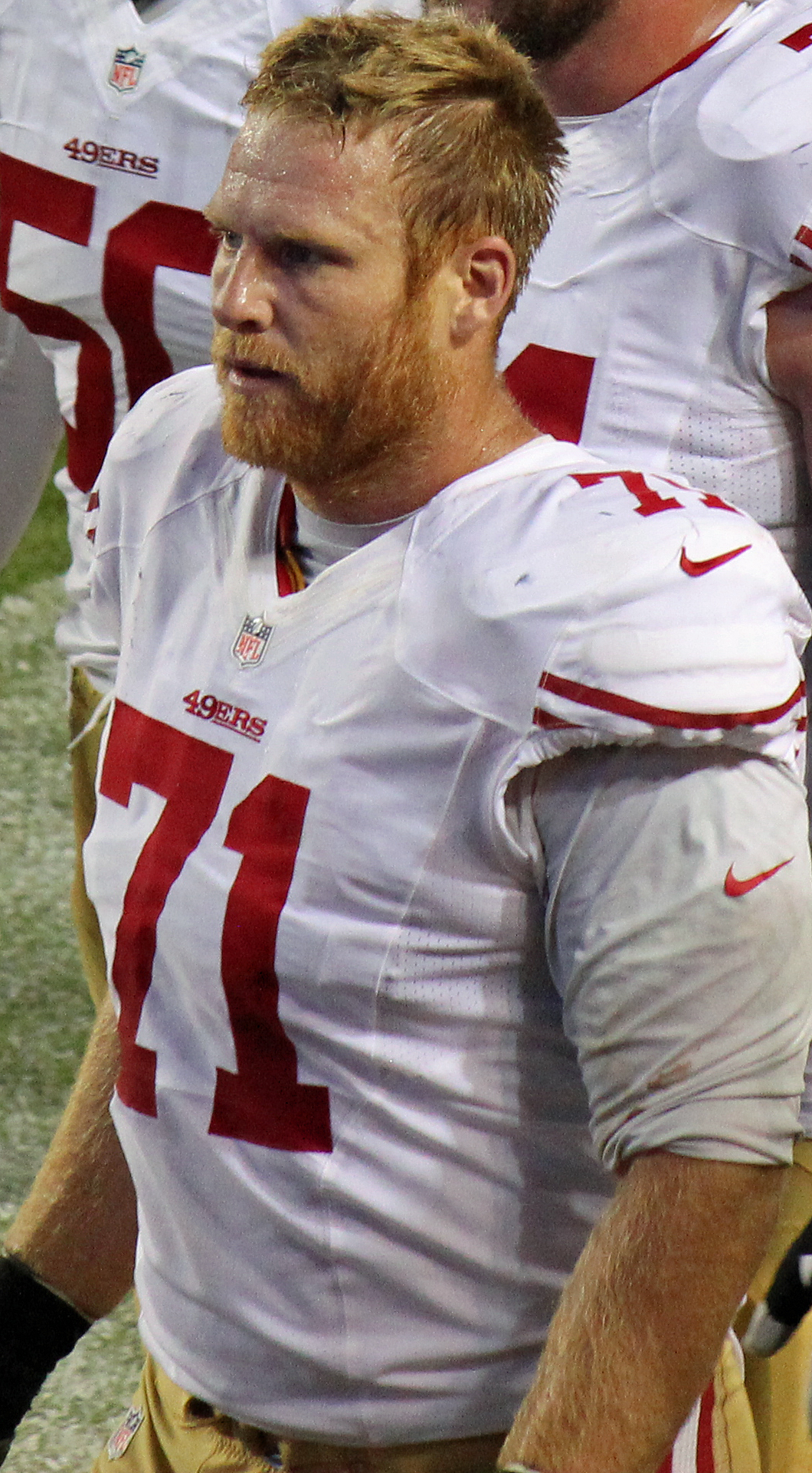
- Pears with the San Francisco 49ers in 2015

No. 64, 72, 79, 71
- Position: Offensive tackle

Personal information
- Born: June 25, 1982 (age 44); Price, Utah, U.S.
- Listed height: 6 ft 8 in (2.03 m)
- Listed weight: 316 lb (143 kg)

Career information
- High school: John F. Kennedy (Denver, Colorado)
- College: Colorado State
- NFL draft: 2005: undrafted

Career history
- Denver Broncos (2005); Cologne Centurions (2006); Denver Broncos (2006–2008); Oakland Raiders (2009–2010); Jacksonville Jaguars (2010); Omaha Nighthawks (2010); Buffalo Bills (2010–2014); San Francisco 49ers (2015)

Awards and highlights
- 2× First-team All-MW (2003, 2004)

Career NFL statistics
- Games played: 117
- Games started: 102
- Fumble recoveries: 1
- Stats at Pro Football Reference

Erik Anders Pears (born June 25, 1982) is an American former professional football player who was an offensive tackle in the National Football League (NFL). He played college football for the Colorado State Rams and was signed by the Denver Broncos as an undrafted free agent in 2005.

He was also a member of the Cologne Centurions, Oakland Raiders, Jacksonville Jaguars, Omaha Nighthawks, Buffalo Bills, and San Francisco 49ers.

== Early life ==
Pears attended John Fitzgerald Kennedy High School in Denver, Colorado and was a letterman in track and field football and wrestling. In football, he was a two-time All-State selection. In wrestling, he was a three-time League titlist.

== College career ==
Pears committed to Colorado State University in 2000 where he played as an offensive lineman for the Rams football team.

== Professional career ==
=== Buffalo Bills ===
Pears signed a multi-year contract extension on December 13, 2011.

=== San Francisco 49ers ===
On March 17, 2015, Pears signed a two-year contract with the San Francisco 49ers. The contract was worth up to $5.7 million, with $1 million guaranteed, and a $500,000 signing bonus. Pears started every regular season game at right tackle for the 49ers in 2015. On August 29, 2016, Pears was released by the 49ers.

== Personal life ==
Pears is married and is a father of four children.
