= Adam Goldberg (American football) =

American football player (born 1980)

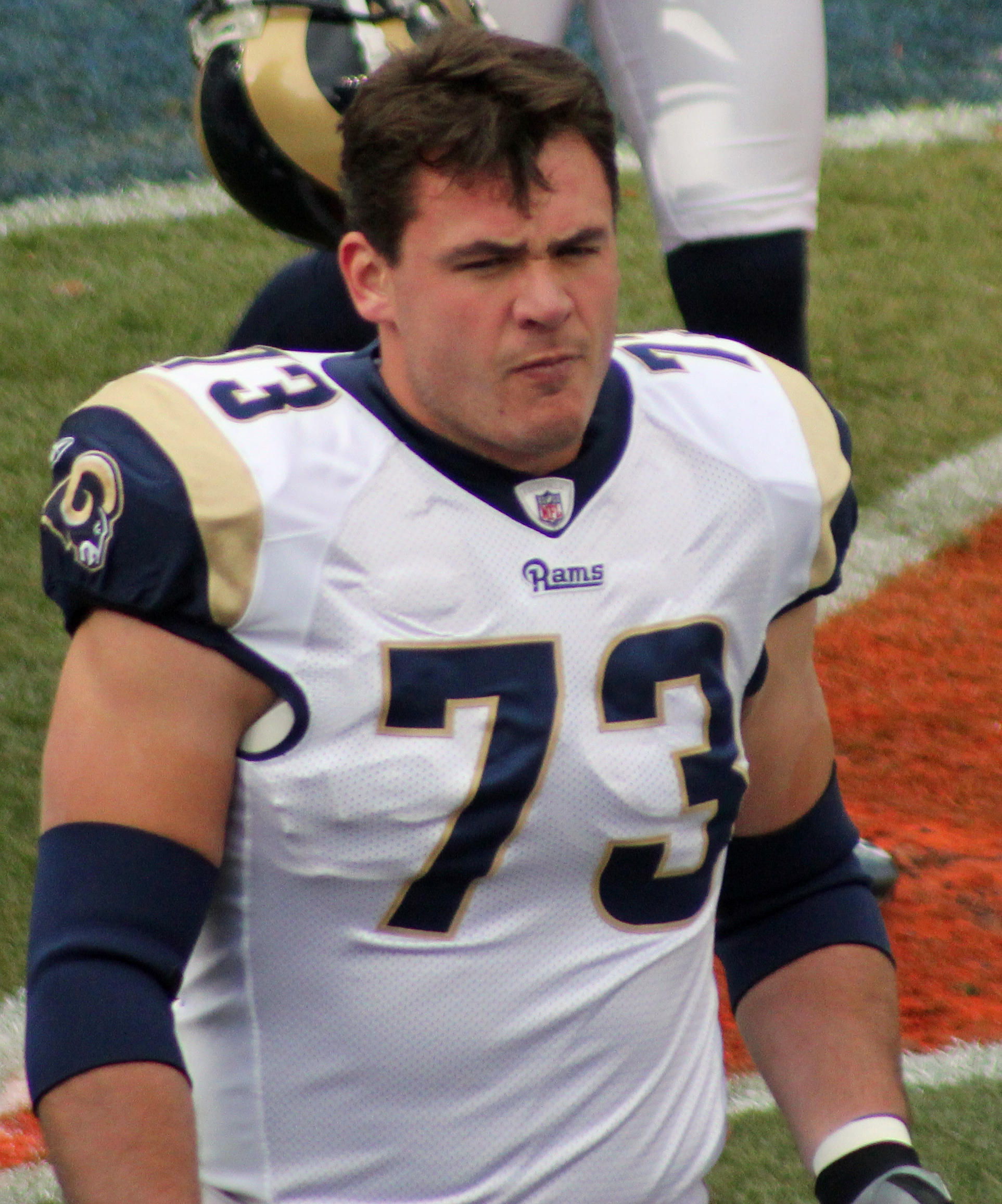
- Goldberg with the St. Louis Rams in 2010

No. 73, 72
- Positions: Tackle, guard

Personal information
- Born: August 12, 1980 (age 46); Edina, Minnesota, U.S.
- Listed height: 6 ft 7 in (2.01 m)
- Listed weight: 318 lb (144 kg)

Career information
- High school: Edina
- College: Wyoming
- NFL draft: 2003: undrafted

Career history
- Minnesota Vikings (2003–2005); St. Louis Rams (2006–2011)

Awards and highlights
- 2× First-team All-MW (2001, 2002); Second-team All-MW (2000)

Career NFL statistics
- Games played: 107
- Games started: 64
- Fumble recoveries: 2
- Stats at Pro Football Reference

Adam David Goldberg (born August 12, 1980) is an American former professional football player who was an offensive tackle in the National Football League (NFL). He played college football for the Wyoming Cowboys. Goldberg was signed by the NFL's Minnesota Vikings in 2003, played for the Vikings from 2003 to 2005, and played for the St. Louis Rams from 2006 to 2011.

== Early life ==
Goldberg was born in Edina, Minnesota. His father is Jewish, and he considers himself Jewish, despite having been raised as Catholic (his mother's Christian faith).

At Edina High School, Goldberg, referred to as "Barch" and "El Barcho Solamente," was a Second-team All-State and All-Metro selection his senior season. He played both offensive and defensive line. His senior season, he recorded 95 tackles (19 solo) and 76 assists.

== College career ==
Goldberg is a University of Wyoming graduate. He became only the third junior in University of Wyoming football history to be elected a team captain when he was voted a captain by his teammates in the spring of 2001. He was Honorable Mention All-America and two-time First-team All-Mountain West Conference. He started 44 of 45 career games. He graduated with a finance degree.

== Professional career ==
=== Minnesota Vikings ===
Goldberg spent 2003 season on Minnesota Vikings. practice squad. In 2004, he started the last six games of the season and two postseason contests. In 2005, he started 12 games at right tackle.

=== St. Louis Rams ===
On September 2, 2006, the Vikings traded Goldberg to the St. Louis Rams for the seventh-round selection (209th overall) in the 2008 NFL draft. In 2006, he played in final 15 games of the season with two starts for the Rams.

The following season, 2007, he played in four games with two starts before being placed on reserve/injured list with a left knee injury suffered in Week 4. An unrestricted free agent in the 2009 offseason, Goldberg was re-signed by the Rams on March 20, 2009, to a two-year, $1.8 million contract.

== See also ==
- List of select Jewish football players
