= Casey Bramlet =

American football player (born 1981)

No. 5, 13
- Position: Quarterback

Personal information
- Born: April 2, 1981 (age 45); Casper, Wyoming, U.S.
- Listed height: 6 ft 4 in (1.93 m)
- Listed weight: 220 lb (100 kg)

Career information
- High school: Wheatland (WY)
- College: Wyoming
- NFL draft: 2004: 7th round, 218th overall pick

Career history
- Cincinnati Bengals (2004); Hamburg Sea Devils (2005); Washington Redskins (2006;2007)*; Hamburg Sea Devils (2007); Atlanta Falcons (2007); Miami Dolphins (2007); San Diego Chargers (2008)*; Baltimore Ravens (2008)*; Winnipeg Blue Bombers (2009)
- * Offseason or practice squad member only

Awards and highlights
- World Bowl champion (XV); World Bowl MVP (XV); Second-team All-MW (2001)

Casey Bramlet (born April 2, 1981) is an American former professional football quarterback. He was selected by the Cincinnati Bengals in the seventh round of the 2004 NFL draft. He played college football at Wyoming.

He was also a member of the Washington Redskins, Atlanta Falcons, Miami Dolphins, San Diego Chargers, Baltimore Ravens and Winnipeg Blue Bombers. He was World Bowl XV Most Valuable Player with the Hamburg Sea Devils in 2007.

== Early life ==
Bramlet attended Wheatland High School in Wheatland, Wyoming, where he earned all-state, and Casper Star Tribune Super 25 selection as a quarterback. During the 1999 season, he played in the Shrine Bowl, and was named Absaroka Conference Co-Player of the Year. As a senior, he threw for 2,264 yards and 21 touchdowns. Bramlet was also an outstanding basketball player. He earned all-conference and all-state honors, and the Wheatland basketball team was ranked No. 1 in the state in his senior year. He was also the team captain for both football and basketball. He also lettered in track. An excellent student, he was a member of the National Honor Society. He was recruited by Colorado State.

== College career ==
Bramlet played college football at the University of Wyoming where he set new records in career passing yards, (9,684) TD passes (56) and completions (767). He is the only player in school history to pass for 3,000 yards in three different seasons. On September 27, 2013, Brett Smith broke Bramlet's record for TD passes in the first quarter against the Air Force Academy Falcons. He started all 35 games in his final three seasons at Wyoming, and also scored 14 career rushing touchdowns.

== Professional career ==
=== Cincinnati Bengals ===
Bramlet was drafted by the Cincinnati Bengals in the seventh round (218th overall) of the 2004 NFL draft, and started the 2004 season third on the depth chart, but ended the season second (to Jon Kitna) when Carson Palmer got injured.

On February 14, 2005, the Bengals allocated Bramlet to the Hamburg Sea Devils of NFL Europe.

Bramlet started all ten games of Hamburg's inaugural season, and led them to a 5–5 record with 1,463 yards, seven touchdowns, and ten interceptions on 131-of-212 passes. His best game came in Week 4, when he was named Offensive Player of the Week after leading Hamburg to a 30–10 over the Frankfurt Galaxy, with 264 yards and one touchdown on 17-of-25 passing attempts.

The Bengals released Bramlet on September 3, 2005.

=== Washington Redskins ===
On January 21, 2006, Bramlet was signed by the Washington Redskins. The Redskins released Bramlet on August 28, 2006.

In January 2007, Bramlet returned to the NFL, signing with the Washington Redskins as an unrestricted free agent. A few days after signing with the Redskins, he was allocated back to NFL Europe. On June 23, 2007, he led the Hamburg Sea Devils to a 37–28 victory over Frankfurt Galaxy in World Bowl XV, and Bramlet was named the game's most valuable player. On August 6, 2007, Bramlet was cut from the Redskins official roster.

=== Atlanta Falcons ===
On August 12, 2007, he was signed by the Atlanta Falcons. With Michael Vick suspended and D. J. Shockley injured, Bramlet saw extensive action in the last two preseason games and started the 2007 season third on the depth chart behind Joey Harrington and Chris Redman. On September 19, 2007, Bramlet was released by the Falcons.

=== Miami Dolphins ===
On October 25, 2007, Bramlet was signed by the Miami Dolphins to their practice squad. On December 22, 2007, Bramlet was added to the active roster of the Miami Dolphins.

Bramlet was one of eight players released by the Dolphins on April 24, 2008.

=== San Diego Chargers ===
A day after being let go by the Dolphins, Bramlet was claimed off waivers by the San Diego Chargers. He was waived on August 26, 2008.

=== Baltimore Ravens ===
On August 28, 2008, Bramlet was claimed off waivers by the Baltimore Ravens. He was waived two days later during final cuts. A day later, he was re-signed to the team's practice squad. On October 1, Bramlet was released.

=== Winnipeg Blue Bombers ===
Bramlet was signed to the Winnipeg Blue Bombers practice roster on September 8, 2009, and added to the active roster on September 12, 2009. On September 16, 2009, Bombers head coach Mike Kelly announced he would play in the September 20 game against the Montreal Alouettes.
