= Mountain West Conference football individual awards =

College football awards

The Mountain West Conference currently gives five individual football awards at the conclusion of every season. The five awards are Offensive Player of the Year, Defensive Player of the Year, Special Teams Player of the Year, Freshman of the Year, and Coach of the Year. Recipients are selected by the votes of the conference's head coaches and a select media panel.

== Player of the Year ==
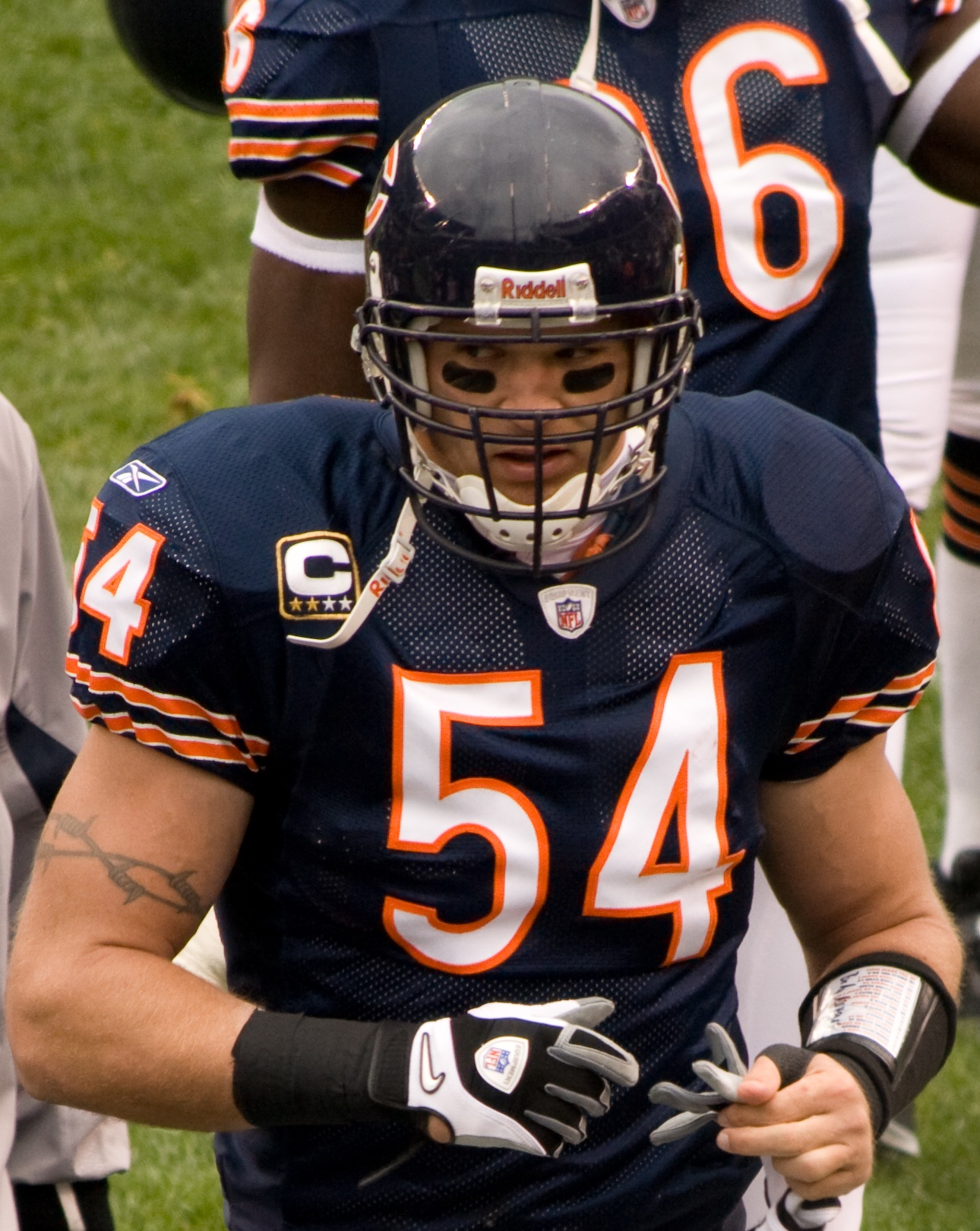
Brian Urlacher was the first and only player to be recognized as Mountain West Conference Player of the Year. He did so in 1999 after leading the conference in tackles (154), forced fumbles (5) and fumble recoveries (3). He went on to be drafted 9th overall in the 2000 NFL draft.

The Mountain West Conference awarded a Player of the Year award once, during its inaugural season. It was not awarded again.

Season	Player	School	Position	Class	Ref.
1999	Brian Urlacher	New Mexico	LB/S	Sr	

== Offensive Player of the Year ==
The Offensive Player of the Year is awarded to the player voted most outstanding at an offensive position.

=== Winners ===
Positions key
QB	Quarterback	RB	Running back	TE	Tight end	WR	Wide receiver
Class key
Fr	Freshman	So	Sophomore	Jr	Junior	Sr	Senior

Season	Player	School	Position	Class	Ref.
1999	Kevin McDougal	Colorado State	RB	Sr	
2000	Matt Newton	Colorado State	QB	Sr	
2000	Mike Thiessen	Air Force	QB	Sr	
2001	Luke Staley	BYU	RB	Jr	
2002	Bradlee Van Pelt	Colorado State	QB	Jr	
2003	Bradlee Van Pelt (2)	Colorado State	QB	Sr	
2004	Alex Smith	Utah	QB	Jr	
2005	DonTrell Moore	New Mexico	RB	Sr	
2006	John Beck	BYU	QB	Sr	
2007	Chad Hall	Air Force	RB/WR	Sr	
2008	Brian Johnson	Utah	QB	Sr	
2009	Andy Dalton	TCU	QB	Jr	
2010	Andy Dalton (2)	TCU	QB	Sr	
2011	Kellen Moore	Boise State	QB	Sr	
2012	Derek Carr	Fresno State	QB	Jr	
2013	Derek Carr (2)	Fresno State	QB	Sr	
2014	Garrett Grayson	Colorado State	QB	Sr	
2015	Donnel Pumphrey	San Diego State	RB	Jr	
2016	Donnel Pumphrey (2)	San Diego State	RB	Sr	
2017	Rashaad Penny	San Diego State	RB	Sr	
2018	Brett Rypien	Boise State	QB	Sr	
2019	Josh Love	San Jose State	QB	Sr	
2020	Carson Strong	Nevada	QB	Jr	
2021	Carson Strong (2)	Nevada	QB	Sr	
2022	Brad Roberts	Air Force	RB	Sr	
2023	Ashton Jeanty	Boise State	RB	So	
2024	Ashton Jeanty (2)	Boise State	RB	Jr	
2025	Anthony Colandrea	UNLV	QB	Jr	

=== Winners by school ===
School (Seasons)	Winners	Years
Colorado State (1999–2025)	5	1999, 2000, 2002, 2003, 2014
Boise State (2011–2025)	4	2011, 2018, 2023, 2024
Air Force (1999–)	3	2000, 2007, 2022
San Diego State (1999–2025)	3	2015, 2016, 2017
BYU (1999–2011)	2	2001, 2006
Fresno State (2012–2025)	2	2012, 2013
Nevada (2012–)	2	2020, 2021
TCU (2005–2012)	2	2009, 2010
Utah (1999–2011)	2	2004, 2008
New Mexico (1999–)	1	2005
San Jose State (2013–)	1	2019
UNLV (1999–)	1	2025

== Defensive Player of the Year ==
The Defensive Player of the Year is awarded to the player voted most outstanding at a defensive position.

=== Winners ===
Positions key
DE	Defensive end	DT	Defensive tackle	LB	Linebacker	DB	Defensive back
Class key
Fr	Freshman	So	Sophomore	Jr	Junior	Sr	Senior

Season	Player	School	Position	Class	Ref.
1999	John Frank	Utah	DE	Sr	
2000	Rick Crowell	Colorado State	LB	Sr	
2001	Kevin Thomas	UNLV	DB	Sr	
2002	Jamaal Brimmer	UNLV	DB	So	
2003	Kirk Morrison	San Diego State	LB	Jr	
2004	Kirk Morrison (2)	San Diego State	LB	Sr	
2004	Morgan Scalley	Utah	DB	Sr	
2005	Eric Weddle	Utah	DB	Jr	
2006	Eric Weddle (2)	Utah	DB	Sr	
2007	Beau Bell	UNLV	LB	Sr	
2008	Jerry Hughes	TCU	DE	Jr	
2009	Jerry Hughes (2)	TCU	DE	Sr	
2010	Tank Carder	TCU	LB	Jr	
2011	Tank Carder (2)	TCU	LB	Sr	
2012	Phillip Thomas	Fresno State	DB	Sr	
2013	Shaquil Barrett	Colorado State	LB	Sr	
2014	Zach Vigil	Utah State	LB	Sr	
2015	Damontae Kazee	San Diego State	DB	Jr	
2016	Damontae Kazee (2)	San Diego State	DB	Sr	
2017	Leighton Vander Esch	Boise State	LB	Jr	
2018	Jeff Allison	Fresno State	LB	Jr	
2019	Curtis Weaver	Boise State	DE	Jr	
2020	Cade Hall	San Jose State	DL	Jr	
2021	Cameron Thomas	San Diego State	DL	Jr	
2022	Viliami Fehoko	San Jose State	DL	Jr	
2023	Mohamed Kamara	Colorado State	DL	Sr	
2024	Jackson Woodard	UNLV	LB	Sr	
2025	Jaxton Eck	New Mexico	LB	Jr	
2025	Chris Johnson	San Diego State	DB	Sr	

=== Winners by school ===
School (Seasons)	Winners	Years
San Diego State (1999–2025)	6	2003, 2004, 2015, 2016, 2021, 2025
TCU (2005–2012)	4	2008, 2009, 2010, 2011
UNLV (1999–)	4	2001, 2002, 2007, 2024
Utah (1999–2011)	4	1999, 2004, 2005, 2006
Colorado State (1999–2025)	3	2000, 2013, 2023
Boise State (2011–2025)	2	2017, 2019
Fresno State (2012–2025)	2	2012, 2018
San Jose State (2013–)	2	2020, 2022
New Mexico (1999–)	1	2025
Utah State (2013–2025)	1	2014

== Special Teams Player of the Year ==
The Special Teams Player of the Year award is given to the player voted best on special teams. The recipient can either be a placekicker, punter, returner, or a position known as a gunner.

=== Winners ===
Positions key
PK	Placekicker	KR	Kick returner	P	Punter	PR	Punt returner	RS	Return specialist
Class key
Fr	Freshman	So	Sophomore	Jr	Junior	Sr	Senior		

Season	Player	School	Position	Class	Ref.
2006	Kenny Byrd	New Mexico	PK	Sr	
2006	Louie Sakoda	Utah	PK/P	So	
2007	Louie Sakoda (2)	Utah	PK/P	Jr	
2008	Louie Sakoda (3)	Utah	PK/P	Sr	
2009	Jeremy Kerley	TCU	KR	Jr	
2010	Jeremy Kerley (2)	TCU	KR	Sr	
2011	Greg McCoy	TCU	KR	Sr	
2012	Mike Edwards	Hawai'i	KR	Jr	
2013	Carlos Wiggins	New Mexico	KR	So	
2014	Will Conant	Air Force	PK/P	Sr	
2015	Rashaad Penny	San Diego State	KR	So	
2016	Rashaad Penny (2)	San Diego State	KR	Jr	
2017	Rashaad Penny (3)	San Diego State	RS	Sr	
2018	Cooper Rothe	Wyoming	PK	Jr	
2019	Avery Williams	Boise State	RS	Jr	
2020	Avery Williams (2)	Boise State	RS	Sr	
2021	Matt Araiza	San Diego State	P/PK	Jr	
2022	Jack Browning	San Diego State	P/PK	Sr	
2023	Jose Pizano	UNLV	PK	Sr	
2024	Ricky White III	UNLV	WR	Sr	
2025	Kansei Matsuzawa	Hawai‘i	PK	So	

=== Winners by school ===
School (Seasons)	Winners	Years
San Diego State (1999–2025)	5	2015, 2016, 2017, 2021, 2022
TCU (2005–2012)	3	2009, 2010, 2011
Utah (1999–2011	3	2006, 2007, 2008
Boise State (2011–2025)	2	2019, 2020
Hawai'i (2012–)	2	2012, 2025
New Mexico (1999–)	2	2006, 2013
UNLV (1999–)	2	2023, 2024
Air Force (1999–)	1	2014
Wyoming (1999–)	1	2018

== Freshman of the Year ==
The Freshman of the Year award is given to the conference's best freshman.

=== Winners ===
Positions key
DL	Defensive lineman	LB	Linebacker	DB	Defensive back	QB	Quarterback
RB	Running back	WR	Wide receiver	KR	Kick returner		

Season	Player	School	Position	Ref.
1999	Luke Staley	BYU	RB	
2000	Brandon Ratcliff	New Mexico	DB	
2000	Jason Kaufusi	Utah	DL	
2001	Dominique Dorsey	UNLV	RB/KR	
2002	DonTrell Moore	New Mexico	RB	
2003	Lynell Hamilton	San Diego State	RB	
2004	Austin Collie	BYU	WR	
2005	Aaron Brown	TCU	RB	
2006	Ryan Wolfe	UNLV	WR	
2007	Harvey Unga	BYU	RB	
2008	Tim Jefferson	Air Force	QB	
2009	Austyn Carta-Samuels	Wyoming	QB	
2010	Ronnie Hillman	San Diego State	RB	
2011	Brett Smith	Wyoming	QB	
2012	Davante Adams	Fresno State	WR	
2013	Tyler Winston	San Jose State	WR	
2014	Devonte Boyd	UNLV	WR	
2015	Brett Rypien	Boise State	QB	
2016	Logan Wilson	Wyoming	LB	
2017	Armani Rogers	UNLV	QB	
2018	Toa Taua	Nevada	RB	
2019	George Holani	Boise State	RB	
2020	Kyle Williams	UNLV	WR	
2021	Cameron Friel	UNLV	QB	
2022	Taylen Green	Boise State	QB	
2023	Jayden Maiava	UNLV	QB	
2024	Caden Chittenden	UNLV	PK	
2025	Micah Alejado	Hawai‘i	QB	

=== Winners by school ===
School (Seasons)	Winners	Years
UNLV (1999–)	8	2001, 2006, 2014, 2017, 2020, 2021, 2023, 2024
Boise State (2011–2025)	3	2015, 2019, 2022
BYU (1999–2011)	3	1999, 2004, 2007
Wyoming (1999–)	3	2009, 2011, 2016
New Mexico (1999–)	2	2000, 2002
San Diego State (1999–2025)	2	2003, 2010
Air Force (1999–)	1	2008
Fresno State (2012–2025)	1	2012
Hawai'i (2012–)	1	2025
Nevada (2012–)	1	2018
San Jose State (2013–)	1	2013
TCU (2005–2012)	1	2005
Utah (1999–2011)	1	2000

== Coach of the Year ==
=== Winners ===
Season	Coach	School	Record	Ref.
1999	Sonny Lubick	Colorado State	8−4	
2000	John Robinson	UNLV	8−5	
2000	Sonny Lubick (2)	Colorado State	10−2	
2001	Gary Crowton	BYU	12−2	
2002	Rocky Long	New Mexico	7−7	
2003	Urban Meyer	Utah	10−2	
2004	Urban Meyer (2)	Utah	12−0	
2005	Gary Patterson	TCU	11−1	
2006	Bronco Mendenhall	BYU	11−2	
2007	Troy Calhoun	Air Force	9−4	
2008	Kyle Whittingham	Utah	13−0	
2009	Gary Patterson (2)	TCU	12−1	
2010	Brady Hoke	San Diego State	9−4	
2011	Dave Christensen	Wyoming	8−5	
2012	Rocky Long (2)	San Diego State	9−4	
2013	Matt Wells	Utah State	9−5	
2014	Jim McElwain	Colorado State	10−2	
2015	Rocky Long (3)	San Diego State	11−3	
2016	Craig Bohl	Wyoming	8−6	
2017	Jeff Tedford	Fresno State	10−4	
2018	Matt Wells (2)	Utah State	10−2	
2019	Nick Rolovich	Hawai'i	10−5	
2020	Brent Brennan	San Jose State	7−1	
2021	Brady Hoke (2)	San Diego State	12−2	
2022	Andy Avalos	Boise State	10−4	
2023	Barry Odom	UNLV	9−5	
2024	Spencer Danielson	Boise State	12−2	
2025	Jason Eck	New Mexico	9−3	

=== Winners by school ===
School (Seasons)	Winners	Years
San Diego State (1999–2025)	4	2010, 2012, 2015, 2021
Colorado State (1999–2025)	3	1999, 2000, 2014
Utah (1999–2011)	3	2003, 2004, 2008
Boise State (2011–2025)	2	2022, 2024
BYU (1999–2011)	2	2001, 2006
New Mexico (1999–)	2	2002, 2025
TCU (2005–2012)	2	2005, 2009
UNLV (1999–)	2	2000, 2023
Utah State (2013–2025)	2	2013, 2018
Wyoming (1999–)	2	2011, 2016
Air Force (1999–)	1	2007
Fresno State (2012–2025)	1	2017
Hawai'i (2012–)	1	2019
San Jose State (2013–)	1	2020
