= 2000 BYU Cougars football team =

American college football season

2000 BYU Cougars football
- Conference: Mountain West Conference
- Record: 6–6 (4–3 MW)
- Head coach: LaVell Edwards (29th season)
- Co-offensive coordinators: Roger French (20th season); Lance Reynolds (1st season)
- Offensive scheme: West Coast
- Defensive coordinator: Ken Schmidt (10th season)
- Base defense: 4–3
- Captains: Setema Gali; Margin Hooks; Jared Lee; Kalani Sitake
- Home stadium: Cougar Stadium

2000 Mountain West Conference football standings
	Conf.			Overall
Team	W		L	W		L
No. 14 Colorado State $	6	–	1	10	–	2
Air Force	5	–	2	9	–	3
UNLV	4	–	3	8	–	5
BYU	4	–	3	6	–	6
New Mexico	3	–	4	5	–	7
Utah	3	–	4	4	–	7
San Diego State	3	–	4	3	–	8
Wyoming	0	–	7	1	–	10
$ – Conference champion; Rankings from AP Poll

The 2000 BYU Cougars football team represented Brigham Young University during the 2000 NCAA Division I-A football season. It was LaVell Edwards' final season as head coach of the program he had helped elevate to national prominence.

== Schedule ==
Date	Time	Opponent	Site	TV	Result	Attendance	Source
August 26	6:00 pm	vs. No. 2 Florida State*	Alltel Stadium; Jacksonville, FL (Pigskin Classic)	ABC	L 3–29	54,260	
September 2	1:30 pm	at Virginia*	Scott Stadium; Charlottesville, VA	ABC	W 38–35 ^{OT}	60,435	
September 9	11:00 am	at Air Force	Falcon Stadium; Colorado Springs, CO	SWP	L 23–31	45,277	
September 14	6:00 pm	Mississippi State*	Cougar Stadium; Provo, UT	ESPN	L 28–44	60,278	
September 23	1:00 pm	UNLV	Cougar Stadium; Provo, UT	ESPN Plus	W 10–7	60,191	
September 30	6:00 pm	at Syracuse*	Carrier Dome; Syracuse, NY	ESPN2	L 14–42	43,090	
October 6	7:00 pm	Utah State*	Cougar Stadium; Provo, UT (rivalry)	SWP	W 38–14	63,318	
October 21	1:00 pm	San Diego State^{†}	Cougar Stadium; Provo, UT	ESPN Plus	L 15–16	61,194	
October 26	6:00 pm	Wyoming	Cougar Stadium; Provo, UT	ESPN	W 19–7	56,422	
November 2	6:00 pm	at Colorado State	Hughes Stadium; Fort Collins, CO	ESPN	L 21–45	27,412	
November 18	4:00 pm	New Mexico	Cougar Stadium; Provo, UT	SWP	W 37–13	62,308	
November 24	4:00 pm	at Utah	Rice–Eccles Stadium; Salt Lake City, UT (Holy War)	ESPN	W 34–27	45,064	
*Non-conference game; ^{†}Homecoming; Rankings from AP Poll released prior to the game; All times are in Mountain time

SportsWest Productions (SWP) games were shown locally on KSL 5. BYU Sports Network carried all home games on a tape delayed basis with commentary provided by Brett Richins and Chris Twitty.

== Game summaries ==
=== Vs. No. 2 Florida State ===
2000 Pigskin Classic

Team	1	2	3	4	Total
Cougars	0	0	3	0	3
• No. 2 Seminoles	15	7	0	7	29

- Date: August 26
- Location: Alltel Stadium, Jacksonville, FL
- Game start: 8:07 p.m. EDT
- Elapsed time: 3:35
- Game attendance: 54,260
- Game weather: Party Cloudy, 82 °F (28 °C), winds SW 3 mph (4.8 km/h)
- Referee: Bill LeMonnier
- TV announcers (ABC): Brad Nessler, Bob Griese, Lynn Swann

Scoring summary
1	14:08	FSU	Javon Walker 19-yard pass from Chris Weinke (Matt Munyon kick failed)	FSU 6-0
1	3:01	FSU	Atrews Bell 3-yard pass from Chris Weinke (Matt Munyon kick)	FSU 13-0
1	2:42	FSU	Team Safety	FSU 15-0
2	12:26	FSU	Atrews Bell 6-yard run (Matt Munyon kick)	FSU 22-0
3	2:19	BYU	Owen Pochman 42-yard field goal	FSU 22-3
4	1:11	FSU	Travis Minor 5-yard run (Matt Munyon kick)	FSU 29-3

Statistics	BYU	FSU
First downs	18	25
Total yards	225	376
Rushing yards	-2	58
Passing yards	227	318
Turnovers	4	0
Time of possession	29:54	30:06

Team	Category	Player	Statistics
BYU	Passing	Bret Engemann	12/28, 139 yards, 2 INT
BYU	Rushing	Kalani Fifita Sitake	5 rushes, 20 yards
BYU	Receiving	Tevita Ofahengaue	3 receptions, 75 yards
Florida State	Passing	Chris Weinke	32/50, 318 yards, 2 TD
Florida State	Rushing	Travis Minor	16 rushes, 37 yards, TD
Florida State	Receiving	Marvin Minnis	9 receptions, 137 yards

=== At Virginia ===
Team	1	2	3	4	OT	Total
• Cougars	0	0	14	21	3	38
Cavaliers	7	14	7	7	0	35

- Date: September 2
- Location: Scott Stadium, Charlottesville, VA
- Game start: 3:35 p.m. EDT
- Elapsed time: 3:23
- Game attendance: 60,435
- Game weather: 71% Humidity w/ High Clouds, 82 °F (28 °C), winds 6 mph (9.7 km/h)
- Referee: Gerald Wright
- TV announcers (ABC): Sean McDonough, Ed Cunningham, Leslie Gudel

Scoring summary
1	11:08	UVA	Arlen Harris 28-yard run (David Greene kick)	UVA 7-0
2	10:40	UVA	Antwoine Womack 4-yard run (David Greene kick)	UVA 14-0
2	7:44	UVA	Tyree Foreman 5-yard run (David Greene kick)	UVA 21-0
3	12:26	BYU	Brian McDonald 6-yard run (Owen Pochman kick)	UVA 21-7
3	7:39	BYU	Brian McDonald 1-yard run (Owen Pochman kick)	UVA 21-14
3	0:29	UVA	Kevin Coffey 28-yard pass from Dan Ellis (David Greene kick)	UVA 28-14
4	14:13	BYU	Brian McDonald 6-yard run (Owen Pochman kick)	UVA 28-21
4	12:13	UVA	Antwoine Walker 67-yard run (David Greene kick)	UVA 35-21
4	8:11	BYU	Doug Jolley 6-yard pass from Bret Engemann (Owen Pochman kick)	UVA 35-28
4	0:50	BYU	Margin Hooks 6-yard pass from Bret Engemann (Owen Pochman kick)	TIED 35-35
OT		BYU	Owen Pochman 26-yard field goal	BYU 38-35

Statistics	BYU	UVA
First downs	25	19
Total yards	540	487
Rushing yards	93	270
Passing yards	447	217
Turnovers	3	1
Time of possession	32:09	27:51

Team	Category	Player	Statistics
BYU	Passing	Bret Engemann	34/41, 447 yards, 2 TD, 2 INT
BYU	Rushing	Brian McDonald	20 rushes, 86 yards, 3 TD
BYU	Receiving	Jonathan Pittman	6 receptions, 161 yards
Virginia	Passing	Dan Ellis	13/23, 217 yards, TD, INT
Virginia	Rushing	Antwoine Womack	15 rushes, 160 yards, 2 TD
Virginia	Receiving	Demetrius Dotson	4 receptions, 99 yards

=== At Air Force ===
Team	1	2	3	4	Total
Cougars	10	10	0	3	23
• Falcons	7	14	7	3	31

- Date: September 9
- Location: Falcon Stadium, Colorado Springs, CO
- Game start: 11:07 a.m. MDT
- Elapsed time: 3:04
- Game attendance: 45,277
- Game weather: Sunny w/ Few Clouds, 75 °F (24 °C), winds SW 15–25 mph (24–40 km/h)
- Referee: Clair Gausman
- TV announcers (SportsWest): Dave McCann, Blaine Fowler, Kathy Aiken

Scoring summary
1	10:07	BYU	Owen Pochman 27-yard field goal	BYU 3-0
1	7:36	AFA	Qualario Brown 13-yard pass from Mike Thiessen (Dave Adams kick)	AFA 7-3
1	5:25	BYU	Luke Staley 13-yard run (Owen Pochman kick)	BYU 10-7
2	14:41	AFA	Ryan Fleming 53-yard pass from Mike Thiessen (Dave Adams kick)	AFA 14-10
2	9:54	BYU	Mike Rigell 19-yard pass from Bret Engemann (Owen Pochman kick)	BYU 17-14
2	4:17	BYU	Owen Pochman 40-yard field goal	BYU 20-14
2	0:55	AFA	Ryan Fleming 20-yard pass from Mike Thiessen (Dave Adams kick)	AFA 21-20
3	6:15	AFA	Qualario Brown 25-yard pass from Mike Thiessen (Dave Adams kick)	AFA 28-20
4	8:31	BYU	Owen Pochman 43-yard field goal	AFA 28-23
4	2:32	AFA	Dave Adams 35-yard field goal	AFA 31-23

Statistics	BYU	AFA
First downs	21	18
Total yards	360	389
Rushing yards	125	186
Passing yards	235	203
Turnovers	3	0
Time of possession	26:24	33:36

Team	Category	Player	Statistics
BYU	Passing	Bret Engemann	18/40, 235 yards, TD, INT
BYU	Rushing	Brian McDonald	10 rushes, 88 yards
BYU	Receiving	Doug Jolley	2 receptions, 66 yards
Air Force	Passing	Mike Thiessen	11/16, 203 yards, 4 TD
Air Force	Rushing	Nate Beard	10 rushes, 59 yards
Air Force	Receiving	Ryan Fleming	5 receptions, 145 yards, 2 TD

=== Mississippi State ===
Team	1	2	3	4	Total
• Bulldogs	10	21	7	6	44
Cougars	0	7	7	14	28

- Date: September 14
- Location: Cougar Stadium, Provo, UT
- Game start: 6:05 p.m. MDT
- Elapsed time: 3:29
- Game attendance: 60,278
- Game weather: Clear and warm, 88 °F (31 °C), winds NE 5–10 mph (8.0–16.1 km/h)
- Referee: Steve Landis
- TV announcers (ESPN): Mike Tirico, Lee Corso, Kirk Herbstreit, Dr. Jerry Punch

Scoring summary
1	11:37	MSU	Dicenzo Miller 14-yard run (Scott Westerfield kick)	MSU 7-0
1	1:03	MSST	Scott Westerfield 22-yard field goal	MSU 10-0
2	14:51	BYU	Jonathan Pittman 39-yard pass from Charlie Peterson (Owen Pochman kick)	MSU 10-7
2	13:04	MSST	Wayne Madkin 56-yard run (Scott Westerfield kick)	MSU 17-7
2	12:11	MSST	Ellis Wyms fumble recovery in the end zone (Scott Westerfield kick)	MSU 24-7
2	9:03	MSST	Dicenzo Miller 78-yard pass from Wayne Madkin (Scott Westerfield kick)	MSU 31-7
3	10:45	BYU	Marcus Whalen 2-yard run (Owen Pochman kick)	MSU 31-14
3	3:49	MSST	Josh Morgan 97-yard fumble return (Scott Westerfield kick)	MSU 38-14
4	10:12	BYU	Brian McDonald 3-yard run (Owen Pochman kick)	MSU 38-21
4	6:03	MSST	Conner Stephens 36-yard interception return (Dicenzo Miller rush failed)	MSU 44-21
4	1:55	BYU	Jonathan Pittman 19-yard pass from Charlie Peterson (Owen Pochman kick)	MSU 44-28

Statistics	MSST	BYU
First downs	14	27
Total yards	375	333
Rushing yards	208	65
Passing yards	167	268
Turnovers	2	4
Time of possession	24:20	35:40

Team	Category	Player	Statistics
Mississippi State	Passing	Wayne Madkin	12/19, 150 yards, TD
Mississippi State	Rushing	Wayne Madkin	7 rushes, 104 yards, TD
Mississippi State	Receiving	Dicenzo Miller	2 receptions, 87 yards, TD
BYU	Passing	Charlie Peterson	27/50, 268 yards, 2 TD, 2 INT
BYU	Rushing	Brian McDonald	16 rushes, 52 yards, TD
BYU	Receiving	Margin Hooks	8 receptions, 68 yards

=== UNLV ===
Team	1	2	3	4	Total
Rebels	0	0	0	7	7
• Cougars	10	0	0	0	10

- Date: September 23
- Location: Cougar Stadium, Provo, UT
- Game start: 1:05 p.m. MDT
- Elapsed time: 2:56
- Game attendance: 60,191
- Game weather: Overcast w/ some rain, 41 °F (5 °C), winds NE 5 mph (8.0 km/h)
- Referee: Tom Robinson
- TV announcers (ESPN+): Chris Marlowe, JC Pearson, Beth Mowins

Scoring summary
1	10:15	BYU	Brian McDonald 25-yard run (Owen Pochman kick)	BYU 7-0
1	1:28	BYU	Owen Pochman 42-yard field goal	BYU 10-0
4	12:26	UNLV	Jason Thomas 1-yard run (Ray Cheetany kick)	BYU 10-7

Statistics	UNLV	BYU
First downs	10	19
Total yards	243	353
Rushing yards	41	196
Passing yards	202	157
Turnovers	2	1
Time of possession	24:38	35:22

Team	Category	Player	Statistics
UNLV	Passing	Jason Thomas	11/17, 202 yards, INT
UNLV	Rushing	Jason Thomas	14 rushes, 52 yards, TD
UNLV	Receiving	Troy Mason	5 receptions, 102 yards
BYU	Passing	Charlie Peterson	8/11, 95 yards, INT
BYU	Rushing	Luke Staley	28 rushes, 167 yards
BYU	Receiving	Margin Hooks	5 receptions, 49 yards

=== At Syracuse ===
Team	1	2	3	4	Total
Cougars	0	7	7	0	14
• Orangemen	21	21	0	0	42

- Date: September 30
- Location: Carrier Dome, Syracuse, NY
- Game start: 8:00 p.m. EDT
- Elapsed time: 3:16
- Game attendance: 43,090
- Game weather: Indoor Stadium
- Referee: Ken Rivera
- TV announcers (ESPN2): Dave Barnett, Bill Curry, Mike Golic, Holly Rowe

Scoring summary
1	7:53	SYR	Troy Nunes 1-yard run (Mike Shafer kick)	SYR 7-0
1	6:19	SYR	James Mungro 61-yard run (Mike Shafer kick)	SYR 14-0
1	3:16	SYR	Maurice Jackson 18-yard run (Mike Shafer kick)	SYR 21-0
2	12:12	SYR	Pat Woodcock 79-yard pass from Troy Nunes (Mike Shafer kick)	SYR 28-0
2	9:18	BYU	Jonathan Pittman 28-yard pass from Charlie Peterson (Owen Pochman kick)	SYR 28-7
2	3:40	SYR	Pat Woodcock 65-yard pass from Troy Nunes (Mike Safer kick)	SYR 35-7
2	0:31	SYR	James Mungro 20-yard run (Mike Safer kick)	SYR 42-7
3	4:30	BYU	Jonathan Pittman 27-yard pass from Charlie Peterson (Owen Pochman kick)	SYR 42-14

Statistics	BYU	SYR
First downs	19	16
Total yards	293	452
Rushing yards	21	224
Passing yards	272	228
Turnovers	1	0
Time of possession	28:13	31:47

Team	Category	Player	Statistics
BYU	Passing	Charlie Peterson	18/29, 206 yards, 2 TD
BYU	Rushing	Brian McDonald	3 rushes, 22 yards
BYU	Receiving	Margin Hooks	8 receptions, 68 yards
Syracuse	Passing	Troy Nunes	10/11, 228 yards, 2 TD
Syracuse	Rushing	James Mungro	11 rushes, 119 yards, 2 TD
Syracuse	Receiving	Pat Woodcock	2 receptions, 144 yards, 2 TD

=== Utah State ===
Team	1	2	3	4	Total
Aggies	0	7	7	0	14
• Cougars	3	21	7	7	38

- Date: October 6
- Location: Cougar Stadium, Provo, UT
- Game start: 7:07 p.m. MDT
- Elapsed time: 3:03
- Game attendance: 63,318
- Game weather: Clear, 66 °F (19 °C), winds W 10 mph (16 km/h)
- Referee: Glen McKuin
- TV announcers (SportsWest): Dave McCann, Blaine Fowler, Kathy Aiken

Scoring summary
1	8:06	BYU	Owen Pochman 28-yard field goal	BYU 3-0
2	14:16	BYU	Luke Staley 3-yard run (Owen Pochman kick)	BYU 10-0
2	3:13	USU	Emmett White 1-yard run (Brad Bohn kick)	BYU 10-7
2	1:59	BYU	Luke Staley 9-yard run (Owen Pochman kick)	BYU 17-7
2	0:26	BYU	Mike Rigell 21-yard pass from Charlie Peterson (Owen Pochman kick)	BYU 24-7
3	7:09	BYU	Luke Staley 4-yard run (Owen Pochman kick)	BYU 31-7
3	0:00	USU	Chris Stallworth 27-yard pass from Jose Fuentes (Brad Bohn kick)	BYU 31-14
4	10:59	BYU	Brian McDonald 7-yard run (Owen Pochman kick)	BYU 38-14

Statistics	USU	BYU
First downs	17	29
Total yards	243	535
Rushing yards	11	200
Passing yards	232	335
Turnovers	1	1
Time of possession	27:19	32:41

Team	Category	Player	Statistics
Utah State	Passing	Jose Fuentes	25/40, 223 yards, TD
Utah State	Rushing	Emmett White	19 rushes, 61 yards, TD
Utah State	Receiving	Chris Stallworth	4 receptions, 49 yards, TD
BYU	Passing	Charlie Peterson	24/37, 324 yards, TD
BYU	Rushing	Marcus Whalen	10 rushes, 91 yards
BYU	Receiving	Jonathan Pittman	7 receptions, 105 yards

=== San Diego State ===
Team	1	2	3	4	Total
• Aztecs	0	7	6	3	16
Cougars	0	12	0	3	15

- Date: October 21
- Location: Cougar Stadium, Provo, UT
- Game start: 1:05 p.m. MDT
- Elapsed time: 3:44
- Game attendance: 61,194
- Game weather: Overcast w/ some rain, 41 °F (5 °C), winds NE 5 mph (8.0 km/h)
- Referee: Ken Flaherty
- TV announcers (ESPN+): Chris Marlowe, JC Pearson, Beth Mowins

Scoring summary
2	14:14	BYU	Owen Pochman 24-yard field goal	BYU 3-0
2	7:13	BYU	Owen Pochman 28-yard field goal	BYU 6-0
2	3:46	SDSU	Larry Ned 19-yard run (Nate Tandberg kick)	SDSU 7-6
2	0:08	BYU	Margin Hooks 2-yard pass from Charlie Peterson (Peterson pass failed)	BYU 12-7
3	7:53	SDSU	Larry Ned 2-yard run (Lon Sheriff pass failed)	SDSU 13-12
4	0:46	BYU	Owen Pochman 50-yard field goal	BYU 15-13
4	0:01	SDSU	Nate Tandberg 36-yard field goal	SDSU 16-15

Statistics	SDSU	BYU
First downs	14	27
Total yards	309	439
Rushing yards	70	63
Passing yards	239	376
Turnovers	2	1
Time of possession	22:48	37:12

Team	Category	Player	Statistics
San Diego State	Passing	Lon Sheriff	14/29, 239 yards
San Diego State	Rushing	Larry Ned	16 rushes, 54 yards, 2 TD
San Diego State	Receiving	Derrick Lewis	4 receptions, 129 yards
BYU	Passing	Charlie Peterson	34/58, 376 yards, TD
BYU	Rushing	Brian McDonald	15 rushes, 43 yards
BYU	Receiving	Margin Hooks	9 receptions, 124 yards, TD

=== Wyoming ===
Team	1	2	3	4	Total
Cowboys	0	7	0	0	7
• Cougars	0	0	9	10	19

- Date: October 26
- Location: Cougar Stadium, Provo, UT
- Game start: 6:01 p.m. MDT
- Elapsed time: 3:16
- Game attendance: 56,422
- Referee: Ken Rivera
- TV announcers (ESPN): Mike Tirico, Lee Corso, Kirk Herbstreit, Dr. Jerry Punch

Scoring summary
2	0:49	WYO	Malcolm Floyd 12-yard pass from Jay Stoner (Aaron Elling kick)	WYO 7-0
3	6:49	BYU	Charlie Peterson 5-yard run (Owen Pochman run failed)	WYO 7-6
3	1:49	BYU	Owen Pochman 48-yard field goal	BYU 9-7
4	11:21	BYU	Marcus Whalen 4-yard run (Owen Pochman kick)	BYU 16-7
4	4:15	BYU	Owen Pochman 42-yard field goal	BYU 19-7

Statistics	WYO	BYU
First downs	18	18
Total yards	237	353
Rushing yards	68	128
Passing yards	169	225
Turnovers	5	4
Time of possession	30:14	29:46

Team	Category	Player	Statistics
Wyoming	Passing	Jay Stoner	14/22, 100 yards, TD, 3 INT
Wyoming	Rushing	Nate Scott	9 rushes, 32 yards
Wyoming	Receiving	Ryan McGuffey	5 receptions, 52 yards
BYU	Passing	Charlie Peterson	22/34, 225 yards, INT
BYU	Rushing	Luke Staley	23 rushes, 88 yards
BYU	Receiving	Luke Staley	3 receptions, 78 yards

=== At Colorado State ===
Team	1	2	3	4	Total
Cougars	0	0	7	14	21
• Rams	21	17	7	0	45

- Date: November 2
- Location: Hughes Stadium, Ft. Collins, CO
- Game start: 6:01 p.m. MST
- Elapsed time: 3:15
- Game attendance: 27,412
- Game weather: Chance of flurries, 38 °F (3 °C), Winds W 1 mph (1.6 km/h)
- Referee: Gerald Wright
- TV announcers (ESPN): Mike Tirico, Lee Corso, Kirk Herbstreit, Dr. Jerry Punch

Scoring summary
1	11:24	CSU	Pete Rebstock 69-yard pass from Matt Newton (C.W. Hurst kick)	CSU 7-0
1	2:48	CSU	Joey Cappari 13-yard pass from Matt Newton (C.W. Hurst kick)	CSU 14-0
1	0:47	CSU	Cecil Sapp 39-yard run (C.W. Hurst kick)	CSU 21-0
2	14:13	CSU	C.W. Hurst 43-yard field goal	CSU 24-0
2	7:56	CSU	Rahsaan Sanders 3-yard run (C.W. Hurst kick)	CSU 31-0
2	1:48	CSU	Cecil Sapp 9-yard run (C.W. Hurst kick)	CSU 38-0
3	8:22	CSU	Will Layne 51-yard pass from Matt Newton	CSU 45-0
3	4:26	BYU	Brandon Doman 8-yard run (Owen Pochman kick)	CSU 45-7
4	12:53	BYU	Jonathan Pittman 3-yard pass from Brandon Doman (Owen Pochman kick)	CSU 45-14
4	7:00	BYU	Luke Staley 4-yard run (Owen Pochman kick)	BYU 45-21

Statistics	BYU	CSU
First downs	9	22
Total yards	177	463
Rushing yards	57	165
Passing yards	120	298
Turnovers	5	3
Time of possession	23:46	36:14

Team	Category	Player	Statistics
BYU	Passing	Brandon Doman	7/17, 72 yards, TD, 2 INT
BYU	Rushing	Brian McDonald	5 rushes, 29 yards
BYU	Receiving	Luke Staley	7 receptions, 36 yards
Colorado State	Passing	Matt Newton	19/31, 298 yards, 3 TD
Colorado State	Rushing	Cecil Sapp	18 rushes, 119 yards, 2 TD
Colorado State	Receiving	Pete Rebstock	4 receptions, 110 yards, TD

=== New Mexico ===
Team	1	2	3	4	Total
Lobos	0	10	3	0	13
• Cougars	7	10	17	3	37

- Date: November 18
- Location: Cougar Stadium, Provo, UT
- Game start: 4:07 p.m. MST
- Elapsed time: 3:28
- Game attendance: 62,308
- Game weather: 36 °F (2 °C), clear and cold, winds S 5–10 mph (8.0–16.1 km/h)
- Referee: Ken Flaherty
- TV announcers (SportsWest): Tom Kirkland, Blaine Fowler

Scoring summary
1	4:17	BYU	Luke Staley 2-yard run (Owen Pochman kick)	BYU 7-0
2	13:46	UNM	Vladimir Borombozin 24-yard field goal	BYU 7-3
2	11:31	BYU	Brian McDonald 1-yard run (Owen Pochman kick)	BYU 14-3
2	9:00	UNM	Javier Hanson 48-yard pass from Rudy Caamano (Vladimir Borombozin kick)	BYU 14-10
2	0:01	BYU	Owen Pochman 56-yard field goal	BYU 17-10
3	10:11	BYU	Luke Staley 2-yard run (Owen Pochman kick)	BYU 24-10
3	7:16	UNM	Vladimir Borombozin 27-yard field goal	BYU 24-13
3	4:35	BYU	Brandon Doman 8-yard run (Owen Pochman kick)	BYU 31-13
3	2:40	BYU	Owen Pochman 32-yard field goal	BYU 34-13
4	9:38	BYU	Owen Pochman 33-yard field goal	UNM 37-13

Statistics	UNM	BYU
First downs	14	23
Total yards	268	512
Rushing yards	90	163
Passing yards	178	349
Turnovers	2	2
Time of possession	27:51	32:09

Team	Category	Player	Statistics
New Mexico	Passing	Rudy Caamano	11/26, 178 yards, TD
New Mexico	Rushing	Holmon Wiggins	12 rushes, 65 yards
New Mexico	Receiving	Javier Hanson	2 receptions, 96 yards, TD
BYU	Passing	Brandon Doman	21/35, 349 yards, INT
BYU	Rushing	Brandon Doman	9 rushes, 51 yards, TD
BYU	Receiving	Margin Hooks	4 receptions, 69 yards

=== At Utah ===
Team	1	2	3	4	Total
• Cougars	13	6	7	8	34
Utes	7	3	0	17	27

- Date: November 24
- Location: Rice-Eccles Stadium, Salt Lake City, UT
- Game start: 4:07 p.m. MST
- Elapsed time: 3:33
- Game attendance: 45,064
- Game weather: Party Cloudy, 36 °F (2 °C), winds NE 4 mph (6.4 km/h)
- Referee: Tom Robinson
- TV announcers (ESPN): Dave Barnett, Bill Curry, Mike Golic, Michele Tafoya

Scoring summary
1	14:08	UTAH	Andre Dyson 24-yard interception return (Ryan Kaneshiro kick)	UTAH 7-0
1	7:50	BYU	Owen Pochman 45-yard field goal	UTAH 7-3
1	4:42	BYU	Brian McDonald 3-yard run (Owen Pochman kick)	BYU 10-7
1	0:11	BYU	Owen Pochman 38-yard field goal	BYU 13-7
2	14:07	BYU	Owen Pochman 35-yard field goal	BYU 16-7
2	4:42	BYU	Owen Pochman 22-yard field goal	BYU 19-7
2	1:35	UTAH	Ryan Kaneshiro 40-yard field goal	BYU 19-10
3	4:35	BYU	Mike Rigell 35-yard pass from Brandon Doman (Owen Pochman kick)	BYU 26-10
4	13:53	UTAH	Ryan Kaneshiro 33-yard field goal	BYU 26-13
4	7:51	UTAH	Thomas Fortune 2-yard run (Ryan Kaneshiro kick)	BYU 26-20
4	2:16	UTAH	Matt Nickel 20-yard pass from Darnell Arceneaux (Ryan Kaneshiro kick)	UTAH 27-26
4	0:23	BYU	Brandon Doman 4-yard run (Brandon Doman to Soren Halladay pass)	BYU 34-27

Statistics	BYU	UTAH
First downs	21	14
Total yards	384	322
Rushing yards	100	70
Passing yards	284	252
Turnovers	1	2
Time of possession	31:37	28:23

Team	Category	Player	Statistics
BYU	Passing	Brandon Doman	16/29, 284 yards, TD, INT
BYU	Rushing	Brandon Doman	18 rushes, 39 yards, TD
BYU	Receiving	Jonathan Pittman	4 receptions, 117 yards
Utah	Passing	Lance Rice	9/20, 137 yards, INT
Utah	Rushing	Dameon Hunter	13 rushes, 37 yards
Utah	Receiving	Chris Christensen	7 receptions, 147 yards

== Roster ==
2000 BYU Cougars football team roster
Players
Coaches
Offense

Pos.	#	Name	Class
QB	11	Brandon Doman	Jr
QB	13	Bret Engemann	So
QB	17	Charlie Peterson	Jr
RB	6	Luke Staley	So
WR	2	David Christensen	Fr
WR	20	Reno Mahe	Jr
WR	80	Tody Christensen	Fr
TE	42	Gabriel Reid	So
TE	88	Doug Jolley	Jr
TE	89	Spencer Nead	So

Defense

Pos.	#	Name	Class
DE	92	Ryan Denney	Jr
LB	55	Justin Ena	Jr
DT	58	Chris Hoke	Sr
DE	93	Brett Keisel	Jr
S	9	Jared Lee	Sr
DT	72	Hans Olsen	Sr

Special teams

Pos.	#	Name	Class
K	27	Owen Pochman	Sr
P	29	Aaron Edmonds	Jr

Head coach

- LaVell Edwards (Utah State)

Coordinators/assistant coaches

- Robbie Boscoe (BYU)
  Quarterbacks
- Mike Empey (BYU)
  Offensive tackles/tight ends
- Roger French (Minnesota)
  Offensive coordinator/offensive line
- Barry Lamb (UC Santa Barbara)
  Safeties
- Brian Mitchell (BYU)
  Defensive backs
- Chris Pella (Utah State)
  Kickers/wide receivers
- Tom Ramage (Utah State)
  Defensive line/special teams
- Lance Reynolds (BYU)
  Offensive coordinator/running backs
- Ken Schmidt
  Assistant head coach/defensive coordinator
- Paul Tidwell (BYU)
  Running backs

Legend

- (C) Team captain
- (S) Suspended
- (I) Ineligible
- Injured
- Redshirt

Roster
