= Bayfield High School =

Bayfield High School may refer to:

- Bayfield High School, Dunedin in Dunedin, New Zealand
- Bayfield High School (Colorado) in Bayfield, Colorado, USA
- Bayfield High School (Wisconsin) in Bayfield, Wisconsin, USA
