= Rocky Long =

American football player and coach (born 1950)

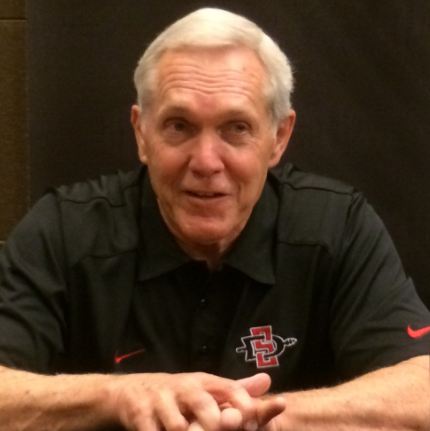
- Long at 2016 Mountain West Media Days

Current position
- Title: Head coach
- Team: Bayfield High School (CO)

Biographical details
- Born: January 27, 1950 (age 76); Provo, Utah, U.S.
- Education: University of New Mexico (BEd)

Playing career
- 1969–1971: New Mexico
- 1972–1973: BC Lions
- 1974: Detroit Wheels
- 1975–1976: BC Lions
- Positions: Defensive back, quarterback

Coaching career (HC unless noted)
- 1972–1973: New Mexico (GA)
- 1974–1975: Eldorado HS (NM) (assistant)
- 1978: New Mexico (OB)
- 1979–1980: New Mexico (DB)
- 1981–1985: Wyoming (DC/DB)
- 1986–1987: BC Lions (LB)
- 1988–1990: TCU (DB)
- 1991–1995: Oregon State (DC/DB)
- 1996–1997: UCLA (DC)
- 1998–2008: New Mexico
- 2009–2010: San Diego State (DC)
- 2011–2019: San Diego State
- 2020–2022: New Mexico (DC/LB)
- 2023: Syracuse (DC)
- 2024: Fort Lewis (DA)
- 2025: Durango HS (CO) (DC)
- 2026: Bayfield HS (CO)

Head coaching record
- Overall: 146–107
- Bowls: 5–9

Accomplishments and honors

Championships
- 3 MW (2012, 2015, 2016)

Awards
- As a coach: 3× MW Coach of the Year (2002, 2012, 2015); As a player: CFL Western All-Star (1977); WAC Offensive Player of the Year (1971)

Roderick John Long Jr. (born January 27, 1950) is an American football coach who is currently the head coach at Bayfield High School in Bayfield, Colorado. He was previously a defensive analyst at Fort Lewis College and was a defensive coordinator at Syracuse and New Mexico. He was a head coach at New Mexico and then San Diego State. He played professionally with BC Lions of the Canadian Football League (CFL) and the Detroit Wheels of World Football League (WFL).

Long is known for his successful adaptation of a modified 3–3–5 defensive scheme.

== Playing career ==
Long was the starting quarterback for the New Mexico Lobos football team from 1969 to 1971, recording consecutive winning seasons and earning player-of-the-year honors in the Western Athletic Conference (WAC) in 1971. His professional career began with the BC Lions of the Canadian Football League (CFL) in 1972, with which he played 68 games in total. In 1974, he departed to the Detroit Wheels of the World Football League (WFL). That year, he intercepted three passes for 38 return yards, and returned 20 punts for 217 yards and 14 kickoffs for 402 yards. He returned to the Lions for three years and had one of his best years in 1975, when he intercepted a team high eight passes for 88 yards. A Western All-Star in 1977, Long also led the team in punt returns in his last three years, and is still the fourth leading all-time returner, with 1946 yards on 192 punt returns, with one touchdown.

== Coaching career ==
Long began developing his version of the 3–3–5 defensive scheme during his stint as the defensive coordinator at Oregon State.

Long returned to New Mexico as the head football coach on December 20, 1997. His overall won-loss record was 65–69 in 11 seasons. His 65 wins are the most of any head coach in program history. Long surpassed Roy W. Johnson's mark of 41 wins during the 2005 season.

Long led the Lobos to three straight bowl games from 2003 to 2005, a first in program history. The Lobos were bowl-eligible for seven straight seasons, from 2001 to 2007, another program record. This streak continued into the 2007 season as the Lobos accepted a bid to the New Mexico Bowl, where Long garnered his bowl win with a victory over the Nevada Wolf Pack.

After an 11-season career, Long resigned on November 17, 2008, two days after the Lobos' regular game season ended. Long cited that he was not the right person to lead the program to newer heights. He added that he had no plans of retirement, and that he wanted to continue to coach as a coordinator. In 2011, he was promoted to head coach at San Diego State after two seasons as their defensive coordinator.

In 2020, Long resigned from San Diego State, and Brady Hoke was named as his replacement. He left San Diego State with 81 wins, second all time in wins behind Don Coryell. Soon after his resignation from SDSU, the University of New Mexico announced Long would be returning to the Lobos to take over as their defensive coordinator under new coach Danny Gonzales, a former player and assistant coach under Long at UNM as well as SDSU.

In 2022, Long was hired at Syracuse to be the defensive coordinator under Dino Babers.

In January 2026, Long was hired as the head football coach at Bayfield High School in Bayfield, Colorado.

== Personal life ==
Long and his wife, Debby, have two daughters, Roxanne and Hannah, who are also coaches. Roxanne is the former women's basketball program head coach at Rogers State University in Claremore, Oklahoma, and Hannah is the women's volleyball program head coach at Queens University of Charlotte.

== Head coaching record ==
Year	Team	Overall	Conference	Standing	Bowl/playoffs	Coaches^{#}	AP^{°}
New Mexico Lobos (Western Athletic Conference) (1998)
1998	New Mexico	3–9	1–7	7th (Pacific)			
New Mexico Lobos (Mountain West Conference) (1999–2008)
1999	New Mexico	4–7	3–4	T–5th			
2000	New Mexico	5–7	3–4	T–5th			
2001	New Mexico	6–5	4–3	T–3rd			
2002	New Mexico	7–7	5–2	2nd	L Las Vegas		
2003	New Mexico	8–5	5–2	2nd	L Las Vegas		
2004	New Mexico	7–5	5–2	2nd	L Emerald		
2005	New Mexico	6–5	4–4	T–4th			
2006	New Mexico	6–7	4–4	5th	L New Mexico		
2007	New Mexico	9–4	5–3	T–3rd	W New Mexico		
2008	New Mexico	4–8	2–6	7th			
New Mexico:		65–69	40–34				
San Diego State Aztecs (Mountain West Conference) (2011–2019)
2011	San Diego State	8–5	4–3	4th	L New Orleans		
2012	San Diego State	9–4	7–1	T–1st	L Poinsettia		
2013	San Diego State	8–5	6–2	2nd (West)	W Famous Idaho Potato		
2014	San Diego State	7–6	5–3	T–1st (West)	L Poinsettia		
2015	San Diego State	11–3	8–0	1st (West)	W Hawaii		
2016	San Diego State	11–3	6–2	1st (West)	W Las Vegas	25	25
2017	San Diego State	10–3	6–2	2nd (West)	L Armed Forces		
2018	San Diego State	7–6	4–4	4th (West)	L Frisco		
2019	San Diego State	10–3	5–3	T–1st (West)	W New Mexico		
San Diego State:		81–38	51–20				
Total:		146–107					
National championship Conference title Conference division title or championship game berth
^{#}Rankings from final Coaches Poll.; ^{°}Rankings from final AP Poll.
