= 2000 Mountain West Conference football season =

College football conference season

- League: NCAA Division I Football Bowl Subdivision
- Sport: Football
- Teams: 8

2001 NFL draft
- Top draft pick: Andre Dyson, cornerback, Utah
- Picked by: Tennessee Titans, 60th overall

Regular season
- Champion: Colorado State
- Runners-up: Air Force

Football seasons
- 1999 2001

2000 Mountain West Conference football standings
	Conf.			Overall
Team	W		L	W		L
No. 14 Colorado State $	6	–	1	10	–	2
Air Force	5	–	2	9	–	3
UNLV	4	–	3	8	–	5
BYU	4	–	3	6	–	6
New Mexico	3	–	4	5	–	7
Utah	3	–	4	4	–	7
San Diego State	3	–	4	3	–	8
Wyoming	0	–	7	1	–	10
$ – Conference champion; Rankings from AP Poll

The 2000 Mountain West Conference football season was the second since eight former members of the Western Athletic Conference banded together to form the Mountain West Conference. Colorado State won the conference championship in 2000, making the Rams the first to win an outright league title after the three-way tie in 1999.

== Coaching changes ==
- Vic Koenning took over at Wyoming, replacing Dana Dimel.

== Bowl games ==
Bowl	Date	Stadium	City	Result
Las Vegas Bowl	December 21, 2000	Sam Boyd Stadium	Las Vegas, Nevada	UNLV 31, Arkansas 14
Liberty Bowl	December 29, 2000	Liberty Bowl Memorial Stadium	Memphis, Tennessee	Colorado State 22, Louisville 17
Silicon Valley Classic	December 31, 2000	Spartan Stadium	San Jose, California	Air Force 37, Fresno State 34

== Awards ==
- Co-Coaches of the Year: Sonny Lubick, Colorado State and John Robinson, UNLV
- Co-Offensive Players of the Year: QB Matt Newton, Sr, Colorado State and QB Matt Thiessen, Sr, Air Force
- Defensive Player of the Year: LB Rick Crowell, Sr, Colorado State
- Co-Freshmen of the Year: DL Jason Kaufusi, Utah and DB Brandon Ratcliff, New Mexico

== All-Conference teams ==
First-team:

Offense
Quarterback	Matt Newton, Sr, Colorado State; AND Matt Thiessen, Sr, Air Force
Running back	Jeremi Rudolph, Sr, UNLV; Cecil Sapp, So, Colorado State
Wide receiver	Ryan Flemming, Jr, Air Force; Pete Rebstock, Jr, Colorado State
Tight end	Jose Ochoa, Jr, Colorado State
Offensive Line	John Greer, Sr, UNLV; Tim Stuber, Sr, Colorado State; Doug Kaufusi, Jr, Utah; David Hildebrand, Sr, Air Force; Justin Borvansky, Sr, Colorado State
Kicker	Owen Pochman, Sr, BYU
Kick returner	Pete Rebstock, Jr, Colorado State

Defense
Defensive line	Patrick Chukwurah, Sr, Wyoming; Setema Gali, Sr, BYU; Brian Johnson, Jr, New Mexico; Anton Palepoi, Jr, UNLV
Linebacker	Rick Crowell, Sr, Colorado State; Justin Ena, Jr, BYU; Kautai Olevao, Sr, Utah
Defensive back	Andre Dyson, Sr, Utah; Kevin Thomas, Jr, UNLV; Will Demps, Jr, San Diego State; John Howell, Sr, Colorado State
Punter	Aaron Edmonds, Jr, BYU

Second-team:

Offense
Running back	Adam Tate, Jr, Utah; Luke Staley, So, BYU
Wide receiver	Steve Smith Sr., Sr, Utah; J. R. Tolver, So, San Diego State
Tight end	Tevita Ofahengaue, Sr, BYU
Offensive Line	Jon Samuelson, Sr, New Mexico; Adam Goldberg, So, Wyoming; David Moreno, Jr, San Diego State; Jason Scukanec, Jr, BYU; Matt Dayoc, Sr, Air Force
Kicker	Dave Adams, Sr, Air Force
Kick returner	Steve Smith Sr., Sr, Utah

Defense
Defensive line	Chris Hoke, Sr, BYU; Hans Olsen, Sr, BYU; Jerome Haywood, Jr, San Diego State; Pete Hogan, So, Colorado State
Linebacker	Mike Barnett, Sr, New Mexico; Jomar Butler, Jr, San Diego State; C. J. Zanotti, Sr, Air Force
Defensive back	Jared Lee, Sr, BYU; Ricky Sharpe, So, San Diego State; Justin Gallimore, Jr, Colorado State; Stephen Persley, Jr, New Mexico
Punter	Brian Simnjanovski, So, San Diego State
