= Setema Gali =

American football player (born 1976)

No. 62
- Position: Defensive end

Personal information
- Born: July 2, 1976 (age 50); Orem, Utah, U.S.
- Listed height: 6 ft 4 in (1.93 m)
- Listed weight: 265 lb (120 kg)

Career information
- High school: Orem (UT) Mountain View
- College: Brigham Young
- NFL draft: 2001: undrafted

Career history
- San Diego Chargers (2001)*; New England Patriots (2001–2002)*
- * Offseason or practice squad member only

Awards and highlights
- First-team All-MW (2000); Second-team All-MW (1999)

Setema Gali, Jr. (born July 2, 1976) is an American former professional football defensive lineman of Samoan descent.

An undrafted free agent out of Brigham Young, Gali was signed by the New England Patriots, where he spent two seasons as a defensive end.

Following his NFL career, Setema was a mortgage broker, real estate investor, hard money lender and a speaker on stages around the country.

As an accomplished musician, Setema accompanied an LDS Gospel Choir Divine Heritage, was a musician for the Polynesian Performing Group Taimane and a keyboard/vocalist for the Reggae Band Mana Poly Allstars.

He was a top sales manager, trainer and recruiter for Vivint and is a business consultant, speaker, trainer and coach for business owners, entrepreneurs and coaches/trainers.
