= Kevin Thomas (cornerback, born 1978) =

American football player (born 1978)

No. 28
- Position: Cornerback

Personal information
- Born: July 28, 1978 (age 48); Phoenix, Arizona, U.S.
- Listed height: 6 ft 0 in (1.83 m)
- Listed weight: 182 lb (83 kg)

Career information
- High school: Sacramento (CA) Foothill
- College: UNLV
- NFL draft: 2002: 6th round, 176th overall pick

Career history
- Buffalo Bills (2002–2005)

Awards and highlights
- MW Defensive Player of the Year (2001); 2× First-team All-MW (2000, 2001); Second-team All-MW (1999)

Career NFL statistics
- Tackles: 83
- Sacks: 1.5
- Interceptions: 1
- Stats at Pro Football Reference

Marvin Kevin Thomas (born July 28, 1978) is an American former professional football player who was a cornerback in the National Football League (NFL). He played college football for the UNLV Rebels.

== Early life ==
Thomas played high school football at Foothill High School in Sacramento, California. He was a standout two-year letterwinner as DB and wide receiver in high school. Recorded five interceptions as senior and three as junior. Named first-team all-conference as senior as well as being the team?s defensive MVP. Tabbed second-team All-Metro as a DB. A top return man who had four punt returns for scores in 1996 . Helped Mustangs to a 12–1 record. Also a two-time all-league small forward on basketball team. In 2015 he was Inducted to Foothill High School Hall of Fame for basketball and football.

== College career ==
Thomas played college football for the UNLV Rebels. Named 2001 Mountain West Defensive Player of the Year after establishing school records with seven interceptions and three returned for TDs. In 1999, intercepted five passes and set school record with 24 pass breakups. Known mostly for his role in the greatest play in school history. Scooped up a fumble in his own end zone and returned it 100 yards to beat Baylor 27–24 on the final play of a 1999 game. Thomas started in 46 consecutive games for the Rebels and amassed 14 interceptions, second only to Marlon Beaver's 17 picks. He was a three time MWC first-team selection as well as the conference's defensive player of the year his senior season. His 68 pass breakups easily tops the NCAA career record. Inducted into UNLV's Hall of Fame in 2012. Nevada.

== Professional career ==
Thomas was selected by the Buffalo Bills in the 6th round (176th overall) of the 2002 NFL draft.
