= 2000 Silicon Valley Football Classic =

American college football game

Air Force Falcons	Fresno State Bulldogs
(8–3)	(7–4)
37	34
Head coach: Fisher DeBerry	Head coach: Pat Hill
	1	2	3	4	Total
Air Force	19	15	3	0	37
Fresno State	7	0	13	14	34
- Date: December 31, 2000
- Season: 2000
- Stadium: Spartan Stadium
- Location: San Jose, California
- MVP: QB Mike Thiessen (Air Force); LB Tim Skipper (Fresno State)
- Referee: Steve Usechek (Big 12)
- Attendance: 26,542
- Payout: US$$1.2 million

United States TV coverage
- Network: Fox Sports Net
- Announcers: Steve Physioc, James Lofton, Tom Ramsey, and Eric Clemons

The 2000 Silicon Valley Football Classic was a post-season college football bowl game between the Air Force Falcons and the Fresno State Bulldogs on December 31, 2000, at Spartan Stadium in San Jose, California. Air Force won the game 37–34; while Air Force led 34–7 at halftime, Fresno State came within three points of tying the game before failing to score on a fake field goal in the last minute of the game.
