= 2000 Liberty Bowl =

2000 AXA Liberty Bowl
- 42nd Liberty Bowl
Colorado State Rams	Louisville Cardinals
(9–2)	(9–2)
Mountain West	C-USA
22	17
Head coach: Sonny Lubick	Head coach: John L. Smith
AP / Coaches / BCS; 23 / 22 / NR	AP / Coaches / BCS; 22 / 23 / NR
	1	2	3	4	Total
Colorado State	3	13	3	3	22
Louisville	7	3	0	7	17
- Date: December 29, 2000
- Season: 2000
- Stadium: Liberty Bowl Memorial Stadium
- Location: Memphis, Tennessee
- MVP: Cecil Sapp (RB, Colorado State)
- Referee: David Neal (MAC)
- Attendance: 58,302

United States TV coverage
- Network: ESPN
- Announcers: Rich Waltz, Don McPherson, and Holly Rowe

The 2000 Liberty Bowl was a college football postseason bowl game played on December 29, 2000, at Liberty Bowl Memorial Stadium in Memphis, Tennessee. The 42nd edition of the Liberty Bowl was played between the Colorado State Rams and the Louisville Cardinals. The game was sponsored by the Axa Equitable Life Insurance Company and was branded as the AXA Liberty Bowl. Colorado State won the game, 22–17; Colorado State running back Cecil Sapp, the game's MVP, ran for a career-high 160 yards and a touchdown.
