= 2000 San Diego State Aztecs football team =

American college football season

2000 San Diego State Aztecs football
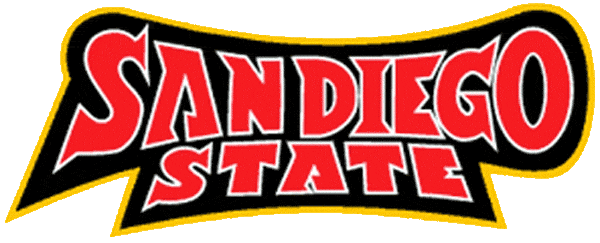
- Conference: Mountain West Conference
- Record: 3–8 (3–4 MW)
- Head coach: Ted Tollner (7th season)
- Offensive coordinator: Dave Lay (8th season)
- Offensive scheme: Pro-style
- Defensive coordinator: Ken Delgado (1st season)
- Base defense: 4–3
- Captain: Lon Sheriff
- Home stadium: Qualcomm Stadium

2000 Mountain West Conference football standings
	Conf.			Overall
Team	W		L	W		L
No. 14 Colorado State $	6	–	1	10	–	2
Air Force	5	–	2	9	–	3
UNLV	4	–	3	8	–	5
BYU	4	–	3	6	–	6
New Mexico	3	–	4	5	–	7
Utah	3	–	4	4	–	7
San Diego State	3	–	4	3	–	8
Wyoming	0	–	7	1	–	10
$ – Conference champion; Rankings from AP Poll

The 2000 San Diego State Aztecs football team represented San Diego State University as a member of the Mountain West Conference (MW) during the 2000 NCAA Division I-A football season. Led by seventh-year head coach Ted Tollner, the Aztecs compiled an overall record of 3–8 with a mark of 3–4 conference play, placing in a three-way tie for fifth place in the MW. The team played home games at Qualcomm Stadium in San Diego.

== Schedule ==
Date	Time	Opponent	Site	TV	Result	Attendance
August 31	7:00 pm	Arizona State*	Qualcomm Stadium; San Diego, CA	ESPN2	L 7–10	30,931
September 9	7:00 pm	No. 21 Illinois*	Qualcomm Stadium; San Diego, CA	ESPN2	L 13–49	26,779
September 16	7:00 pm	at Arizona*	Arizona Stadium; Tucson, AZ		L 3–17	44,973
September 23	3:30 pm	at Oregon State*	Reser Stadium; Corvallis, OR	FSN	L 3–35	32,027
October 7	4:00 pm	at Wyoming	War Memorial Stadium; Laramie, WY	ABC	W 34–0	15,661
October 14	12:00 pm	Utah	Qualcomm Stadium; San Diego, CA	ESPN Plus	L 7–21	17,498
October 21	12:00 pm	at BYU	Cougar Stadium; Provo, UT	ESPN+	W 16–15	61,194
October 28	6:00 pm	Colorado State^{†}	Qualcomm Stadium; San Diego, CA		L 22–34	24,852
November 4	3:00 pm	at New Mexico	University Stadium; Albuquerque, NM	SPW	W 17–16	21,007
November 18	12:00 pm	at Air Force	Falcon Stadium; Colorado Springs, Colorado	ESPN+	L 24–45	33,975
November 25	4:00 pm	UNLV	Qualcomm Stadium; San Diego, CA	SPW	L 24–31	17,184
*Non-conference game; ^{†}Homecoming; Rankings from AP Poll released prior to the game; All times are in Pacific time; Source:
