= 2000 Air Force Falcons football team =

American college football season

2000 Air Force Falcons football

Silicon Valley Football Classic champion

Silicon Valley Football Classic, W 37–34 vs. Fresno State
- Conference: Mountain West Conference
- Record: 9–3 (5–2 MW)
- Head coach: Fisher DeBerry (17th season)
- Offensive scheme: Wishbone triple option
- Defensive coordinator: Richard Bell (6th season)
- Base defense: 3–4
- Captains: Nate Beard; Matt Pommer; Mike Thiessen; Ben Miller
- Home stadium: Falcon Stadium

2000 Mountain West Conference football standings
	Conf.			Overall
Team	W		L	W		L
No. 14 Colorado State $	6	–	1	10	–	2
Air Force	5	–	2	9	–	3
UNLV	4	–	3	8	–	5
BYU	4	–	3	6	–	6
New Mexico	3	–	4	5	–	7
Utah	3	–	4	4	–	7
San Diego State	3	–	4	3	–	8
Wyoming	0	–	7	1	–	10
$ – Conference champion; Rankings from AP Poll

The 2000 Air Force Falcons football team represented the United States Air Force Academy as a member of the Mountain West Conference (MW) during the 2000 NCAA Division I-A football season. Led by 17th-year head coach Fisher DeBerry, the Falcons compiled an overall record of 9–3 with a mark of 5–2 in conference play, placing second in the MW. Air Force was invited to the Silicon Valley Football Classic, where the Falcons defeated Fresno State. The team played home games at Falcon Stadium in Colorado Springs, Colorado

== Schedule ==
Date	Time	Opponent	Site	TV	Result	Attendance	Source
September 2	11:00 a.m.	Cal State Northridge*	Falcon Stadium; Colorado Springs, CO	SPW	W 55–6	50,166	
September 9	11:00 a.m.	BYU	Falcon Stadium; Colorado Springs, CO	SPW	W 32–12	45,277	
September 23	5:00 p.m.	at Utah	Rice–Eccles Stadium; Salt Lake City, UT	ABC	W 23–14	37,151	
September 30	5:00 p.m.	at UNLV	Sam Boyd Stadium; Whitney, NV	ABC	L 13–34	22,321	
October 7	1:00 p.m.	Navy*	Falcon Stadium; Colorado Springs, CO	SPW	W 27–13	50,342	
October 14	1:00 p.m.	at Wyoming	War Memorial Stadium; Laramie, WY		W 51–34	15,452	
October 21	10:00 a.m.	New Mexico	Falcon Stadium; Colorado Springs, CO	SPW	L 23–29	40,446	
October 28	12:30 p.m.	at No. 19 Notre Dame*	Notre Dame Stadium; Notre Dame, IN (rivalry)	NBC	L 31–34 ^{OT}	80,232	
November 4	11:00 a.m.	at Army*	Michie Stadium; West Point, NY		W 41–27	41,287	
November 11	4:00 p.m.	Colorado State	Falcon Stadium; Colorado Springs, CO (rivalry)	ESPN2	W 44–40	35,151	
November 18	11:00 a.m.	San Diego State	Falcon Stadium; Colorado Springs, CO	ESPN Plus	W 45–24	33,975	
December 31	4:00 p.m.	vs. Fresno State*	Spartan Stadium; San Jose, CA (Silicon Valley Football Classic)	FSN	W 37–34	26,542	
*Non-conference game; Rankings from AP Poll released prior to the game; All times are in Mountain time

== Roster ==
NO NAME, POS HT WT CL HOMETOWN

1 Tony Metters, CB          6-0  190  Sr  Mansfield, TX
2 Bryan Blew, QB            5-11 190  So  Edmond, OK
3 Mike Thiessen, QB         6-0  195  Sr  Modesto, CA
4 Kurt Duffy, RB            6-1  190  Sr  Windsor, CO
5 Ryan Fleming, WR          6-5  220  Jr  Wyoming, OH
6 Brian LaBasco, WR         5-9  175  So  Ft Lauderdale, FL
7 Adam Hanes, LB            6-0  195  Jr  Douglasville, GA
7 Joseph Kessler, QB        6-0  190  Sr  Grand Prairie, TX
8 Dustin Ireland, WR        6-0  195  Sr  Farmington, ME
9 Leotis Palmer, TE         5-8  175  So  Darien, GA
10 Daniel Stuart, TE         5-10 180  Jr  Friendswood, TX
11 Dallas Thompson, K        6-0  205  Sr  Arlington, TX
12 Jon Lee, TE               5-10 180  Jr  Paola, KS
13 Brandon Heaney, CB        5-10 180  So  Trabuco Canyon, CA
13 Tony Lopiccolo, WR        6-0  180  So  Rock Springs, WY
14 Jacob Lindaman, WR        5-0  180  So  Lewisville, TX
14 Erik Svendsen, S          6-2  205  Jr  Steamboat Springs, CO
15 Joe Brazier, QB           6-1  190  So  Maple Valley, WA
16 Calvin Jenkins, LB        6-2  200  So  Freemount, CA
17 John Cortney, P           5-11 180  Jr  San Diego, CA
18 Keith Boyea, QB           5-10 190  Jr  George West, TX
19 Tre Cage, LB              6-2  215  Jr  Chantilly, VA
19 Lance Easterling, TE      5-10 180  So  Plano, TX
20 Wes Crawley, CB           6-0  190  So  Elk Grove, CA
21 Joel Buelow, CB           6-1  195  So  Pulaski, WI
22 Ben Bosscher, P/K         5-10 185  So  Louisville, KY
23 Wes Glisson, S            6-0  190  Sr  Huntsville, TX
24 Tom Heier, TE             5-9  180  Jr  Redmond, WA
25 Qualario Brown, TE        5-10 185  Sr  Lake City, SC
26 Don Clark, TE             6-0  200  So  Valparaiso, IN
27 Michael Kelley, RB        5-9  205  So  Garland, TX
27 Paul Mayo, CB             5-10 170  So  Kountze, TX
28 Mustafa Danquah, TE       5-11 190  Jr  Killeen, TX
29 Travis Logsdon, RB        6-3  230  Sr  Loomis, CA
29 Michael Fieberkorn, TE    6-2  195  So  Sturgis, MI
30 Scotty McKay, TE          5-8  175  Sr  Santa Clara, CA
31 Brandon Brown, CB         6-0  170  So  Holyoke, CO
32 Jimmy Burns, RB           5-11 210  Jr  Chantilly, VA
33 Drew Walters, RB          6-1  230  So  Alamosa, CO
34 Nathan Beard, RB          5-10 220  Sr  Grand Junction, CO
35 Ryan Seekins, LB          6-0  230  Jr  Kirkland, WA
35 Matt Karas, RB            6-0  245  So  Evergreen, CA
36 Sam Meinrod, S            6-1  202  Jr  Oldsmar, FL
36 John Welsh, P/K           6-3  190  So  Valdosta, GA
37 Brandon Knox, LB          6-2  230  Jr  Houston, TX
37 Josh Cherkinsky, TE       6-0  215  So  Coral Springs, FL
38 John Hicks, DT            6-2  265  So  North Hollywood, CA
39 Andy Malin, TE            6-3  235  Sr  Fond du Lac, WI
40 Bert Giovanetti, TE       5-9  190  Sr  Lake Geneva, WI
41 Dustin Pratt, LB          5-9  205  Sr  Mission Viejo, CA
42 Corey Nelson, LB          6-4  230  Sr  Rockingham, NC
43 Jon Highley, LB           6-0  220  So  Gobles, MI
44 Scott Becker, RB          5-10 225  Sr  Granger, IN
46 Jamie Arthur, LB          5-9  220  Jr  Lakeland, FL
46 William Sargent, RB       6-0  205  So  Santa Ana, CA
47 Josh Sauls, LB            6-1  230  So  Fayettsville, CA
48 Billy Wilson, LB          6-2  215  Sr  Arlington, TX
48 Larry Vanderoord, LB      6-2  220  So  Avon Lake, OH
49 Andy Rule, LB             6-2  230  Jr  Oxford, OH
50 Matt Mai, DT              6-3  270  Jr  LeMars, IA
51 Kevin Runyon, LB          6-4  230  Jr  Aurora, CO
51 Vincent Sherer IV, LB     6-1  225  Sr  Portland, OR
52 Matt Pommer, LB           5-11 215  Sr  Boulder, CO
53 Andy Kerschbaum, LB       6-3  215  So  Xenia, OH
54 CJ Zanotti, LB            6-1  230  Sr  Bay City, MI
55 Jon Eccles, LB            6-2  235  Jr  Fort Hood, TX
56 Michael Gallagher, LB     6-1  225  Sr  Albuquerque, NM
57 Ryan Finnan, LB           6-2  230  Sr  O'Fallon, IL
58 Dan Alves, LB             6-0  230  Sr  Rocklin, CA
59 Matt McCraney, LB         6-2  220  Jr  Coppell, TX
60 Luke Porisch, T           6-5  275  Sr  St. Ansgar, IA
61 Matt Dayoc, C             6-2  250  Sr  Victoria, TX
62 Brian Strock, T           6-3  265  Jr  Downers Grove, IL
63 David Hildebrand, G       6-3  290  Sr  Houston, TX
64 Paul Cancino, C           6-1  260  Jr  El Paso, TX
65 Joe Franciscovich, T      6-2  255  Jr  Lakeville, MN
66 Dan Heil, G               6-4  270  Sr  Parker, CO
67 Matt Joseph, G            6-5  280  Jr  White Bear Lake, MN
69 Randal Gibbs, G           6-1  260  So  Powder Springs, GA
70 Matt Greene, T            6-2  265  So  Thomasville, NC
71 Ryan Van Maarth, T        6-4  260  Jr  Burlington, CO
72 Mark Hannon, C            6-1  245  Jr  Buffalo, MN
74 Terrance Barreau, G       6-3  300  Jr  Aurora, CO
75 Jonathan Pitts, DT        5-10 240  So  Aiken, SC
76 John Berger, G            6-2  265  So  Sioux City, IA
78 Ben Miller, T             6-4  270  Jr  Columbia Station, OH
79 Joseph Pugh, DT           6-3  265  Jr  Atlantic Beach, FL
80 Rickey Amezaga, WR        5-11 180  So  Grapevine, TX
82 Brooks Walters, K         6-0  185  Jr  Park City, UT
83 Shane Swenson, G          6-2  255  Jr  Minnetonka, MN
84 Ramon Edison, WR          6-3  190  So  Pittsburgh, PA
87 Chris Jessop, TE          6-5  250  Sr  Vacaville, CA
88 Dan Probert, DT           6-4  270  Jr  Kalispell, MT
89 Nate Osborne, DT          6-5  255  Jr  Greenly, CO
90 Alex Mignery, TE          6-3  220  Sr  Hamilton, OH
90 Christian Pierce, DT      6-2  210  So  Colorado Springs, CO
91 Eric Thompson, DT         6-2  245  So  Woodland, TX
92 Zach Johnson, DT          6-3  265  Jr  Junction City, OR
93 Dan Boyd, DT              6-5  275  So  Corma, NY
95 Kyle Allen, DT            6-2  270  Sr  Olympia, WA
96 Kirby Ingram, DT          6-3  235  So  Vienna, GA
96 Adam Thornton, K          5-9  190  So  Bedford, TX
97 Jordan Bounds, P          6-0  180  Sr  Powell, TN
98 Dave Adams, K             5-11 185  Sr  Ft. Lauderdale, FL
99 Justin Pendry, DT         6-6  285  Jr  Bellingham, WA
