= 2000 Wyoming Cowboys football team =

American college football season

2000 Wyoming Cowboys football
- Conference: Mountain West Conference
- Record: 1–10 (0–7 MW)
- Head coach: Vic Koenning (1st season)
- Offensive coordinator: Rusty Burns (1st season)
- Offensive scheme: Spread
- Defensive coordinator: Matt Wallerstedt (1st season)
- Base defense: 3–4
- Home stadium: War Memorial Stadium

2000 Mountain West Conference football standings
	Conf.			Overall
Team	W		L	W		L
No. 14 Colorado State $	6	–	1	10	–	2
Air Force	5	–	2	9	–	3
UNLV	4	–	3	8	–	5
BYU	4	–	3	6	–	6
New Mexico	3	–	4	5	–	7
Utah	3	–	4	4	–	7
San Diego State	3	–	4	3	–	8
Wyoming	0	–	7	1	–	10
$ – Conference champion; Rankings from AP Poll

The 2000 Wyoming Cowboys football team represented the University of Wyoming as a member Mountain West Conference (MW) during the 2000 NCAA Division I-A football season. Led by first-year head coach Vic Koenning, the Cowboys compiled an overall record of 1–10 record with mark 0–7 in conference play, placing last out of eight teams in the MW. The Cowboys offense scored 170 points, while the defense allowed 393 points. The team played home games at War Memorial Stadium in Laramie, Wyoming.

== Schedule ==
Date	Time	Opponent	Site	TV	Result	Attendance	Source
August 31	6:00 pm	at Auburn*	Jordan–Hare Stadium; Auburn, AL	ESPN	L 21–35	76,128	
September 9	5:00 pm	at Texas A&M*	Kyle Field; College Station, TX	FSN	L 3–51	69,723	
September 16	2:00 pm	Central Michigan*	War Memorial Stadium; Laramie, WY		W 31–10	19,050	
September 23	7:05 pm	Nevada*	War Memorial Stadium; Laramie, Wyoming	SPW	L 28–35	13,754	
September 30	2:00 pm	at New Mexico	University Stadium; Albuquerque, NM	SPW	L 10–45	25,089	
October 7	5:00 pm	San Diego State^{†}	War Memorial Stadium; Laramie, WY	ABC	L 0–34	15,661	
October 14	1:00 pm	Air Force	War Memorial Stadium; Laramie, WY		L 34–51	15,452	
October 21	5:00 pm	at UNLV	Sam Boyd Stadium; Whitney, NV	SPW	L 23–42	19,967	
October 26	6:00 pm	at BYU	Cougar Stadium; Provo, UT	ESPN	L 7–19	56,422	
November 11	4:00 pm	Utah	War Memorial Stadium; Laramie, WY		L 0–34	10,195	
November 16	6:00 pm	at Colorado State	Hughes Stadium; Fort Collins, CO (Border War)	ESPN	L 13–37	25,922	
*Non-conference game; ^{†}Homecoming; All times are in Mountain time

== Team players in the NFL ==
The following were selected in the 2001 NFL draft.

Player	Position	Round	Overall	NFL team
Patrick Chukwurah	Linebacker	5	157	Minnesota Vikings
