= 2000 Utah Utes football team =

American college football season

2000 Utah Utes football
- Conference: Mountain West Conference
- Record: 4–7 (3–4 MW)
- Head coach: Ron McBride (11th season)
- Offensive coordinator: Tommy Lee (3rd season)
- Offensive scheme: Pro-style
- Defensive coordinator: Kyle Whittingham (6th season)
- Base defense: 4–3
- Home stadium: Rice–Eccles Stadium]

2000 Mountain West Conference football standings
	Conf.			Overall
Team	W		L	W		L
No. 14 Colorado State $	6	–	1	10	–	2
Air Force	5	–	2	9	–	3
UNLV	4	–	3	8	–	5
BYU	4	–	3	6	–	6
New Mexico	3	–	4	5	–	7
Utah	3	–	4	4	–	7
San Diego State	3	–	4	3	–	8
Wyoming	0	–	7	1	–	10
$ – Conference champion; Rankings from AP Poll

The 2000 Utah Utes football team represented the University of Utah as a member of the Mountain West Conference (MW) during the 2000 NCAA Division I-A football season. Led by 11th-year head coach Ron McBride, the Utes compiled an overall record of 4–7 with a mark of 3–4 in conference play, placing in a three-way tie for fifth in the MW. Utah's record was the program's worst since McBride's first season, in 1990. The team played home games at Rice–Eccles Stadium in Salt Lake City.

== Schedule ==
Date	Time	Opponent	Site	TV	Result	Attendance	Source
September 2	7:00 pm	Arizona*	Rice–Eccles Stadium; Salt Lake City, UT	ESPN2	L 3–17	41,352	
September 9	4:00 pm	at California*	California Memorial Stadium; Berkeley, CA	KJZZ	L 21–24	43,500	
September 16	6:00 pm	Washington State*	Rice–Eccles Stadium; Salt Lake City, UT	KJZZ	L 21–38	38,814	
September 23	5:00 pm	Air Force^{†}	Rice–Eccles Stadium; Salt Lake City, UT	ABC	L 14–23	37,151	
September 30	3:05 pm	at Utah State*	Romney Stadium; Logan, UT (Battle of the Brothers)	KSL	W 35–14	29,814	
October 14	1:05 pm	at San Diego State	Qualcomm Stadium; San Diego, CA	ESPN Plus	W 21–7	17,498	
October 21	5:00 pm	Colorado State	Rice–Eccles Stadium; Salt Lake City, UT	KJZZ	L 17–24	37,505	
October 28	1:00 pm	at New Mexico	University Stadium; Albuquerque, NM	ESPN Plus	L 3–10	21,366	
November 4	1:00 pm	UNLV	Rice–Eccles Stadium; Salt Lake City, UT	ESPN Plus	W 38–16	34,842	
November 11	4:00 pm	at Wyoming	War Memorial Stadium; Laramie, WY	KJZZ	W 34–0	10,195	
November 24	4:00 pm	BYU	Rice–Eccles Stadium; Salt Lake City, UT (Holy War)	ESPN	L 27–34	45,064	
*Non-conference game; ^{†}Homecoming; All times are in Mountain time

== Roster ==
2000 Utah Utes football team roster
Players
Coaches
Offense

Pos.	#	Name	Class
RB	37	Mbe Agbor	Sr
QB	14	Darnell Arceneaux	Sr
OT	69	Jordan Gross	So
TE	85	Matt Hansen	Fr
WR	84	Mark Henderson	Sr
OL	60	Alex Jacobsen	So
WR	1	Cliff Russell	Jr
WR	7	Steve Smith	Sr

Defense

Pos.	#	Name	Class
DE	99	Justyn Boudreau	Fr
DE	47	Andy Bowers	Sr
DB	21	Andre Dyson	Sr
DE	63	Garrett Smith	So

Special teams

Pos.	#	Name	Class

Head coach

- Ron McBride

Coordinators/assistant coaches

Legend

- (C) Team captain
- (S) Suspended
- (I) Ineligible
- Injured
- Redshirt

Roster
Last update: 2000-11-09

== NFL draft ==
Two players went in the 2001 NFL draft, including future pro bowler Steve Smith.

Player	Position	Round	Pick	NFL club
Andre Dyson	Cornerback	2	60	Tennessee Titans
Steve Smith	Wide receiver	3	74	Carolina Panthers
