= Owen Pochman =

American football player (born 1977)

No. 2, 9, 11
- Position: Placekicker

Personal information
- Born: August 2, 1977 (age 49); Renton, Washington, U.S.
- Listed height: 6 ft 0 in (1.83 m)
- Listed weight: 180 lb (82 kg)

Career information
- High school: Mercer Island (Mercer Island, Washington)
- College: BYU (1997-2000)
- NFL draft: 2001: 7th round, 216th overall pick

Career history
- New England Patriots (2001)*; New York Giants (2001–2002); Green Bay Packers (2003)*; St. Louis Rams (2003)*; San Francisco 49ers (2003); Buffalo Bills (2005)*; Frankfurt Galaxy (2005); Baltimore Ravens (2005)*
- * Offseason or practice squad member only

Awards and highlights
- First-team All-MW (2000); Second-team All-MW (1999)

Career NFL statistics
- Games played: 16
- Games started: 0
- Field goals: 8/17
- Field goal %: 47.1
- Extra points: 9/10
- Stats at Pro Football Reference

Owen Pochman (born August 2, 1977) is an American former professional football player who was a placekicker in the National Football League (NFL) for the New York Giants from 2001 to 2002 and San Francisco 49ers in 2003. He played college football for the BYU Cougars and was selected in the seventh round of the 2001 NFL draft with the 216th overall pick.

== Post-football ==
Following his NFL career Owen Pochman wrote a book, I'm Just a Kicker, and dated Brande Roderick. He is a realtor at Mercer Vine and resides in Los Angeles, California.
