= Mike Thiessen =

American football coach

Current position
- Title: Offensive coordinator
- Team: Air Force
- Conference: MW
- Annual salary: $187,000

Playing career
- 1997–2000: Air Force
- Position: Football Quarterback / Baseball Centerfield

Coaching career (HC unless noted)
- 2004–2006: Air Force Prep (OC)
- 2007–2008: Air Force (WR)
- 2009–2010: Air Force (co-OC/WR)
- 2011–2014: Air Force (AHC/co-OC/WR)
- 2015–present: Air Force (OC/QB)

Accomplishments and honors

Awards
- As a player: MW co-Offensive Player of the Year (2000); First-team All-MW (2000)

Mike Thiessen is an American football coach and former player. He currently serves as the assistant head coach, offensive coordinator, and quarterbacks coach at the United States Air Force Academy. He has spent his entire coaching career with Air Force Falcons football.

== Playing career ==
=== Football ===
Thiessen played quarterback for the Air Force Falcons from 1997 to 2000. He was a two-year starter, and a team captain as a senior. Also as a senior, Thiessen led the team in rushing with 713 yards (10 touchdowns), while throwing for 1687 yards (13 touchdowns). He was named the Mountain West Conference offensive player of the year in the fall of 2000.

=== Baseball ===
Thiessen played centerfield for Air Force as well. Along with his senior season in football, he was an All-American baseball player. He has held, or holds, ten Air Force Academy records.

After graduation in 2001, Thiessen was a 42nd round draft pick of the Arizona Diamondbacks in 2001. He played in 27 games with the Yakima Bears “A” team and led the squad with a .308 batting average. His first military assignment was at Luke Air Force Base, Ariz., working in the 62nd Fighter Squadron. He entered the World Class Athlete Program and played with the Lancaster JetHawks, an advanced A affiliate of the Diamondbacks in 2003. He hit .278 with five homers and 42 runs scored in 85 games. Following that season, he returned to Luke and worked in personnel.

== Coaching career ==
Following the completion of his military commitments and baseball career, Thiessen returned to Air Force Academy to coach and teach at the United States Air Force Academy Preparatory School. While at the prep school, Thiessen taught algebra, chemistry, and calculus and served as the offensive coordinator for the football team. His stay lasted from 2004-2006.

Thiessen joined the Air Force Falcons football staff in 2007, starting out as the wide receivers coach. He was promoted to co-offensive coordinator prior to the 2010 season. Four years later (2014), He took over as the sole offensive coordinator. The following year, Thiessen moved from coaching the wide receivers to coaching the quarterbacks.

== Personal life ==
Thiessen and his wife, Kristen (McClellan), have two children, Andrew and Brooke.

Thiessen is a member of the United States Air Force Academy Athletic Hall of Fame.
