= Bret Engemann =

American football player (born 1977)

No. 13, 8
- Position: Quarterback

Personal information
- Born: December 7, 1977 (age 48); Burbank, California, U.S.
- Listed height: 6 ft 5 in (1.96 m)
- Listed weight: 235 lb (107 kg)

Career information
- High school: Timpview (Provo, Utah)
- College: BYU (1999–2002)
- NFL draft: 2003: undrafted

Career history
- Oakland Raiders (2003–2005)*; → Frankfurt Galaxy (2004)*; → Rhein Fire (2004); → Berlin Thunder (2005)
- * Offseason or practice squad member only

Bret A. Engemann (born December 7, 1977) is an American former football quarterback. He played college football for the BYU Cougars, and professionally in NFL Europe. He was on the Oakland Raiders' practice squad in 2004.

== Early life ==
Bret A. Engemann was born on December 7, 1977, in Burbank, California. He was a four-year letterman in football and a two-year letterman in baseball at Timpview High School in Provo, Utah. He threw for 2,400 yards and 23 touchdowns as a senior, earning Super Prep All-American and Utah Gatorade Player of the Year honors.

== College career ==
Engemann enrolled at Brigham Young University to play college football for the BYU Cougars. He served his LDS Church mission in Boston. He played in five regular season games as a freshman in 1999, completing three of four passes for 13 yards. Engemann also completed 6 of 11 passes for 45 yards in the 1999 Motor City Bowl. He opened the 2000 season as BYU's starting quarterback. In the second game of the year against Virginia on September 2, he recorded 34 completions on 41 attempts for 447 passing yards in a come-from-behind 38–35 overtime win. Engemann's 34 completions and 447 passing yards were both second best all-time for a single game in the Mountain West Conference (MWC). He was named the MWC Offensive Player of the Week. He suffered a season-ending shoulder injury on September 30 against Syracuse. He played in six games overall in 2000, completing 72 of 134 passes (53.7%) for 896 yards, three touchdowns, and six interceptions.

Engemann redshirted the 2001 season due to his shoulder injury. He ran the scout team in 2001. As a redshirt junior in 2002, Engemann returned as the starting quarterback. However, he was benched partway through the year and ended the season as the third-string quarterback. Engemann appeared in eight games overall during the 2002 season, completing 119 of 215 passes (55.3%) for 1,334 yards, six touchdowns, and eight interceptions. He also scored a rushing touchdown.

== Professional career ==
Engemann skipped his senior year to enter the 2003 NFL draft. After going undrafted, he signed with the Oakland Raiders on April 30. He was released on July 30, 2003. Engemann re-signed with the Raiders on January 9, 2004. He was allocated to NFL Europe to play for the Frankfurt Galaxy during the 2004 NFL Europe season. However, at the conclusion of training camp, he was reassigned to the Rhein Fire. Engemann played in one game for the Fire as a backup quarterback, recording two completions on five attempts for 40 yards. He was released by the Raiders on September 5, 2004, before the start of the NFL regular season. He was then signed to the Raiders' practice squad on September 7. Engemann was released by the Raiders again on October 26, 2004. On January 20, 2005, he signed with Oakland for the fourth time. He was allocated to NFL Europe to play for the Berlin Thunder. He appeared in six games as a backup for the Thunder during the 2005 NFL Europe season, completing 17 of 33 passes for 162 yards and one touchdown. On September 3, 2005, before the start of the 2005 NFL regular season, Engemann was released by the Raiders for the final time.

== Personal life ==
Engemann is the son of record industry executive Karl Engemann. In 2021, Bret married reality television star Demi Engemann.
