= 2000 Colorado State Rams football team =

American college football season

2000 Colorado State Rams football
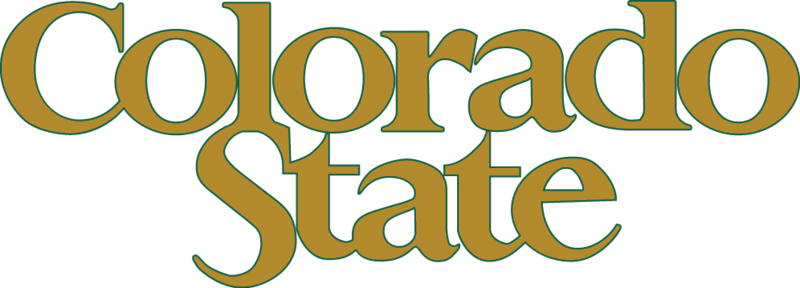

MW champion Liberty Bowl champion

Liberty Bowl, W 22–17 vs. Louisville
- Conference: Mountain West Conference

Ranking
- Coaches: No. 15
- AP: No. 14
- Record: 10–2 (6–1 MW)
- Head coach: Sonny Lubick (8th season)
- Offensive coordinator: Steve Fairchild (4th season)
- Defensive coordinator: Larry Kerr (8th season)
- Home stadium: Hughes Stadium

2000 Mountain West Conference football standings
	Conf.			Overall
Team	W		L	W		L
No. 14 Colorado State $	6	–	1	10	–	2
Air Force	5	–	2	9	–	3
UNLV	4	–	3	8	–	5
BYU	4	–	3	6	–	6
New Mexico	3	–	4	5	–	7
Utah	3	–	4	4	–	7
San Diego State	3	–	4	3	–	8
Wyoming	0	–	7	1	–	10
$ – Conference champion; Rankings from AP Poll

The 2000 Colorado State Rams football team represented Colorado State University in the 2000 NCAA Division I-A football season. The team was led by eighth-year head coach Sonny Lubick and played its home games at Hughes Stadium. They finished the regular season with a 9–2 record overall and a 6–1 record in Mountain West Conference games, making them conference champions. The team was selected to play in the Liberty Bowl, in which they defeated Louisville.

== Schedule ==
Date	Time	Opponent	Rank	Site	Result	Attendance
September 2	5:00 pm	vs. No. 23 Colorado*		Mile High Stadium; Denver, CO (Rocky Mountain Showdown)	W 28–24	67,567
September 9	2:00 pm	East Tennessee State*		Hughes Stadium; Fort Collins, CO	W 41–7	25,122
September 16	8:00 pm	at Arizona State*		Sun Devil Stadium; Tempe, AZ	L 10–13	51,911
September 30	2:00 pm	at Nevada*		Mackay Stadium; Reno, NV	W 45–14	19,003
October 7	1:00 pm	New Mexico		Hughes Stadium; Fort Collins, CO	W 17–14	27,507
October 14	7:30 pm	UNLV		Hughes Stadium; Fort Collins, CO	W 20–19	31,700
October 21	5:00 pm	at Utah		Rice–Eccles Stadium; Salt Lake City, UT	W 24–17	37,505
October 28	7:05 pm	at San Diego State		Qualcomm Stadium; San Diego, CA	W 34–22	24,852
November 2	6:00 pm	BYU		Hughes Stadium; Fort Collins, CO	W 45–21	27,412
November 11	4:00 pm	at Air Force		Falcon Stadium; Colorado Springs, CO (rivalry)	L 40–44	35,151
November 16	6:00 pm	Wyoming		Hughes Stadium; Fort Collins, CO (Border War)	W 37–13	25,922
December 29	11:30 am	vs. No. 22 Louisville*	No. 23	Liberty Bowl Memorial Stadium; Memphis, TN (Liberty Bowl)	W 22–17	58,302
*Non-conference game; Rankings from AP Poll released prior to the game; All times are in Mountain time

== Rankings ==
Ranking movements Legend: ██ Increase in ranking ██ Decrease in ranking — = Not ranked
	Week																
Poll	Pre	1	2	3	4	5	6	7	8	9	10	11	12	13	14	15	Final
AP	—	—	—	—	—	—	—	—	—	—	—	—	—	23	23	—	14
Coaches Poll	—	—	—	25	—	—	—	—	—	24	21	20	—	23	22	22	15
BCS	Not released									—	—	—	—	—	—	—	Not released
