= 2000 UNLV Rebels football team =

American college football season

2000 UNLV Rebels football

Las Vegas Bowl champion

Las Vegas Bowl, W 31–14 vs. Arkansas
- Conference: Mountain West Conference
- Record: 8–5 (4–3 MW)
- Head coach: John Robinson (2nd season)
- Defensive coordinator: Mike Bradeson (1st season)
- Home stadium: Sam Boyd Stadium

2000 Mountain West Conference football standings
	Conf.			Overall
Team	W		L	W		L
No. 14 Colorado State $	6	–	1	10	–	2
Air Force	5	–	2	9	–	3
UNLV	4	–	3	8	–	5
BYU	4	–	3	6	–	6
New Mexico	3	–	4	5	–	7
Utah	3	–	4	4	–	7
San Diego State	3	–	4	3	–	8
Wyoming	0	–	7	1	–	10
$ – Conference champion; Rankings from AP Poll

The 2000 UNLV Rebels football team represented the University of Nevada, Las Vegas (UNLV) as a member of the Mountain West Conference (MW) during the 2000 NCAA Division I-A football season. Led by second-year head coach John Robinson, the Rebels compiled an overall record of 8–5 record with mark of 4–3 in conference play, tying for third place in the MW. UNLV was invited to the Las Vegas Bowl, where the Rebels defeated Arkansas. The team played home games at Sam Boyd Stadium in Whitney, Nevada.

== Schedule ==
Date	Time	Opponent	Site	TV	Result	Attendance	Source
September 9	11:00 a.m.	at Iowa State*	Jack Trice Stadium; Ames, IA	ESPN Plus	L 22–37	35,408	
September 16	7:00 p.m.	North Texas*	Sam Boyd Stadium; Whitney, NV		W 38–0	16,544	
September 23	12:00 p.m.	at BYU	Cougar Stadium; Provo, UT	ESPN Plus	L 7–10	60,191	
September 30	4:00 p.m.	Air Force	Sam Boyd Stadium; Whitney, NV	ABC	W 34–13	22,321	
October 7	7:00 p.m.	Nevada*	Sam Boyd Stadium; Whitney, NV (Fremont Cannon)	SPW	W 38–7	27,578	
October 14	6:30 p.m.	at Colorado State	Hughes Stadium; Fort Collins, CO	ESPN2	L 19–20	31,700	
October 21	4:00 p.m.	Wyoming^{†}	Sam Boyd Stadium; Whitney, NV	SPW	W 42–23	19,967	
October 28	11:00 a.m.	at Ole Miss*	Vaught–Hemingway Stadium; Oxford, MS		L 40–43 ^{OT}	40,338	
November 4	12:00 p.m.	at Utah	Rice–Eccles Stadium; Salt Lake City, UT	ESPN Plus	L 16–38	34,842	
November 11	12:00 p.m.	New Mexico	Sam Boyd Stadium; Whitney, NV	ESPN Plus	W 18–14	17,081	
November 25	4:00 p.m.	at San Diego State	Qualcomm Stadium; San Diego, CA	SPW	W 31–24	17,184	
December 2	8:00 p.m.	at Hawaii*	Aloha Stadium; Halawa, HI	ESPN Plus	W 34–32	34,792	
December 21	5:00 p.m.	vs. Arkansas*	Sam Boyd Stadium; Whitney, NV (Las Vegas Bowl)	ESPN2	W 31–14	25,868	
*Non-conference game; ^{†}Homecoming; All times are in Pacific time
