= Jason Kaufusi =

American football player and coach (born 1979)

Current position
- Title: Run game coordinator & defensive line coach
- Team: Washington
- Conference: Big Ten

Biographical details
- Born: February 27, 1979 (age 47); Salt Lake City, Utah, U.S.
- Education: University of Utah

Playing career
- 2000–2003: Utah
- Position: Defensive end

Coaching career (HC unless noted)
- 2004–2008: Cottonwood HS (DL/strength)
- 2009: Utah (CB)
- 2010–2011: Weber State (DE)
- 2012–2013: BYU (GA)
- 2014–2015: Weber State (DE)
- 2016: Weber State (DC/DE)
- 2017–2018: Nevada (DL)
- 2019–2021: UCLA (OLB)
- 2022–2023: Arizona (OLB/DB/STC)
- 2024–present: Washington (RGC/DL)

Accomplishments and honors

Awards
- MW co-Freshman of the Year (2000); 2× First-team All-MW (2001, 2002)

Jason Linden Kaufusi (born February 27, 1979) is an American college football coach and former player who is the Run game coordinator and defensive line coach for the Washington Huskies. He played as a defensive end for the Utah Utes.

== Early life ==
Kaufusi was born on February 27, 1979, to Petelo and Eveline Kaufusi, both Tongan immigrants who came to the United States in 1972. He played high school football at East High School in Salt Lake City, where his team won the Utah 4A state title in 1996, when Kaufusi was a senior. Kaufusi played defensive end and tight end for East High; in his senior season, he caught 17 passes for 327 yards as a tight end and recorded 16 sacks as a defensive end.

== Playing career ==
In 1997, Kaufusi signed to play college football at the University of Utah before embarking on a two-year mission to Panama for the Church of Jesus Christ of Latter-day Saints. Kaufusi's freshman season with the Utes was the 2000 season, in which he started nine games. In the 2000 season, Kaufusi recorded 63 tackles and eight sacks and was voted Co-Mountain West Freshman of the Year. In the 2001 and 2002 seasons, Kaufusi earned first-team All-Mountain West honors. Kaufusi entered the 2003 season as an All-America candidate before suffering an injury that sidelined him for the season.

== Coaching career ==
Kaufusi began his coaching career in 2004, when he embarked on a four-year stint as an assistant coach at Cottonwood High School in Murray, Utah, a suburb of Salt Lake City. Kaufusi coached Cottonwood's defensive line, and he was also in charge of academics and helped with strength and conditioning.

In 2009, Kaufusi became an administrative assistant at the University of Utah, his alma mater. He helped with the cornerbacks, which contributed to a passing defense that ranked 14th in the nation that season. Kaufusi went on to serve at Weber State as the defensive ends coach, where he spent the 2010 and 2011 seasons. In 2012 and 2013, Kaufusi served as a defensive graduate assistant at BYU, where he was also the team's academic advisor.

Kaufusi returned to Weber State in 2014, and he went on to coach the defensive ends there for the 2014 and 2015 seasons. After Weber State led the Big Sky Conference in total defense in the 2015 season, Kaufusi was promoted to defensive coordinator in 2016. With Kaufusi as defensive coordinator, Weber State reached the Football Championship Subdivision playoffs for the first time since 2009. That same season, Weber State ranked first in the Big Sky Conference in passing defense, allowing a mere 193.5 yards per game, and five of the Wildcats' defensive players earned all-conference honors.

In 2017, Kaufusi went to Nevada, where he served as the defensive line coach for the 2017 and 2018 seasons. Kaufusi coached Malik Reed and Korey Rush, who earned first-team All-Mountain West honors in the 2017 and 2018 seasons, respectively.

In 2019, Kaufusi was hired as the outside linebackers coach at UCLA. One of the linebackers of Kaufusi's unit, Josh Woods, posted career highs in tackles, tackles for loss, and quarterback sacks. UCLA increased its total number of quarterback sacks from 11 in the 2018 season to 26 in 2019.

In December 2021, Kaufusi was hired by head coach Jedd Fisch to coach outside linebackers at Arizona.

In January 2024, Kaufusi was hired by the Washington Huskies run game coordinator and defensive line coordinator.
