= 2000 New Mexico Lobos football team =

American college football season

2000 New Mexico Lobos football
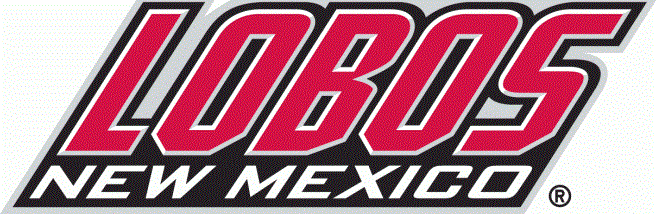
- Conference: Mountain West Conference
- Record: 5–7 (3–4 MW)
- Head coach: Rocky Long (3rd season)
- Offensive coordinator: Dan Dodd (1st season)
- Offensive scheme: Multiple
- Defensive coordinator: Bronco Mendenhall (3rd season)
- Base defense: 3–3–5
- Captains: Mike Barnett; Jarrod Baxter; Henry Stephens
- Home stadium: University Stadium

2000 Mountain West Conference football standings
	Conf.			Overall
Team	W		L	W		L
No. 14 Colorado State $	6	–	1	10	–	2
Air Force	5	–	2	9	–	3
UNLV	4	–	3	8	–	5
BYU	4	–	3	6	–	6
New Mexico	3	–	4	5	–	7
Utah	3	–	4	4	–	7
San Diego State	3	–	4	3	–	8
Wyoming	0	–	7	1	–	10
$ – Conference champion; Rankings from AP Poll

The 2000 New Mexico Lobos football team represented the University of New Mexico as a member of the Mountain West Conference (MW) during the 2000 NCAA Division I-A football season. Led by third-year head coach Rocky Long, the Lobos compiled an overall record of 5–7 with a mark of 3–4 in conference play, placing in a three-way tie for fifth in the MW. New Mexico played home games at University Stadium in Albuquerque, New Mexico.

== Schedule ==
Date	Time	Opponent	Site	TV	Result	Attendance	Source
August 26	8:00 pm	at Texas Tech*	Jones SBC Stadium; Lubbock, TX (Hispanic College Fund Football Classic)	FSN	L 3–24	42,238	
September 2	7:00 pm	Boise State*	University Stadium; Albuquerque, NM		L 14–31	22,090	
September 9	6:05 pm	Oregon State*	University Stadium; Albuquerque, NM		L 20–28	30,830	
September 16		at New Mexico State	Aggie Memorial Stadium; Las Cruces, NM		W 16–13	23,087	
September 23		Northern Arizona*^{†}	University Stadium; Albuquerque, NM		W 35–28	21,553	
September 30		Wyoming	University Stadium; Albuquerque, NM	SPW	W 45–10	25,089	
October 7	1:00 pm	at Colorado State	Hughes Stadium; Fort Collins, CO		L 14–17	27,507	
October 21	10:00 am	at Air Force	Falcon Stadium; Colorado Springs, CO	SPW	W 29–23	40,446	
October 28	1:00 pm	Utah	University Stadium; Albuquerque, NM	ESPN Plus	W 10–3	21,366	
November 4	2:00 pm	San Diego State	University Stadium; Albuquerque, NM	ESPN Plus	L 16–17	21,007	
November 11	11:00 am	at UNLV	Sam Boyd Stadium; Whitney, NV	ESPN Plus	L 14–18	17,081	
November 18	4:00 pm	BYU	Cougar Stadium; Provo, UT	ESPN Plus	L 13–37	62,308	
*Non-conference game; ^{†}Homecoming; All times are in Mountain time

== Game summaries ==
=== At Texas Tech (Hispanic College Fund Football Classic) ===
Team	1	2	3	4	Total
Lobos	0	3	0	0	3
• Red Raiders	7	0	10	7	24

- Date: August 26
- Location: Jones SBC Stadium, Lubbock, Texas
- Game attendance: 42,238
- TV announcers (FSN): Bill Land (Play-by-play) & Gary Reasons (Color)

Scoring summary
1	6:44	Texas Tech	Ricky Williams 6 yard pass from Kliff Kingsbury (Chris Birkholz kick)	Texas Tech 7-0
2	0:00	New Mexico	Vladimir Borombozin 49 yard field goal	Texas Tech 7-3
3	10:51	Texas Tech	Derrek Dorris 8 yard pass from Kliff Kingsbury (Chris Birkholz kick)	Texas Tech 14-3
3	0:33	Texas Tech	Chris Birkholz 33 yard field goal	Texas Tech 17-3
4	8:22	Texas Tech	Aaron Hunt 63 yard fumble return (Chris Birkholz kick)	Texas Tech 24-3

Statistics	UNM	TTU
First downs	13	13
Total yards	167	255
Rushing yards	115	69
Passing yards	52	186
Turnovers	3	1
Time of possession	33:02	26:58

Team	Category	Player	Statistics
New Mexico	Passing	Jeremy Denson	6/18, 52 yards, INT
New Mexico	Rushing	Holmon Wiggins	24 rushes, 91 yards
New Mexico	Receiving	Larry Davis	2 receptions, 20 yards
Texas Tech	Passing	Kliff Kingsbury	21/47, 186 yards, 2 TD, INT
Texas Tech	Rushing	Ricky Williams	15 rushes, 78 yards
Texas Tech	Receiving	Derek Dorris	4 receptions, 53 yards, TD

== Roster ==
2000 New Mexico Lobos football team roster
Players
Coaches
Offense

Pos.	#	Name	Class
QB	10	Ken Stopka	Jr
QB	11	Justin Millea	Fr
QB	12	Rudy Caamano	So
FB	28	Jarrod Baxter	Jr

Defense

Pos.	#	Name	Class

Special teams

Pos.	#	Name	Class
LS	93	Joe Maese	Sr

Head coach

- Rocky Long

Coordinators/assistant coaches

Legend

- (C) Team captain
- (S) Suspended
- (I) Ineligible
- Injured
- Redshirt

Roster

== 2001 NFL draft ==
Player	Position	Round	Pick	NFL club	Ref
Joe Maese	Long snapper	6	194	Baltimore Ravens	
