= Bayfield High School (Colorado) =

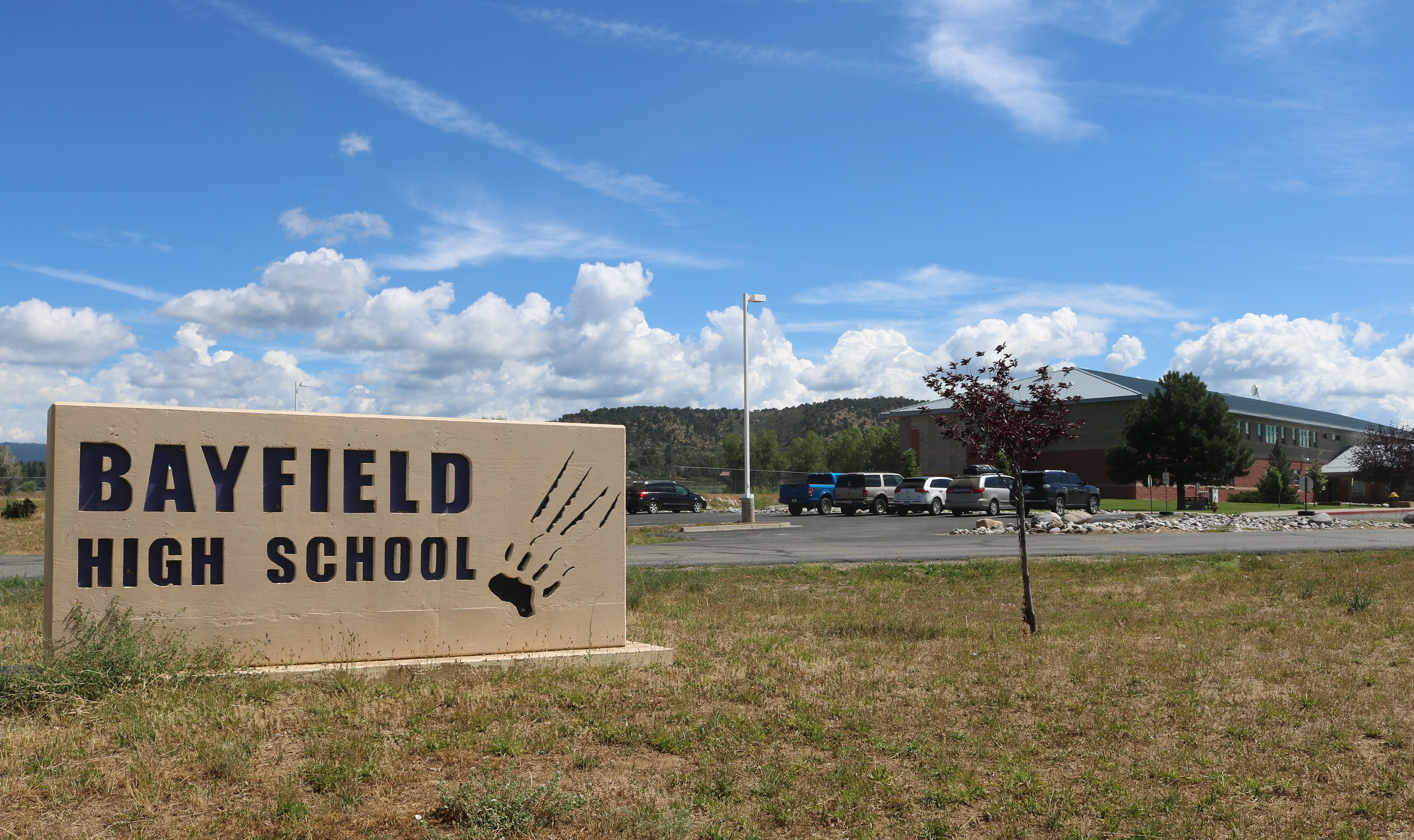
- The school in 2019

Location
- 800 County Road 501; Bayfield, Colorado 81122; United States; 37°14′30″N 107°36′1″W

Information
- School type: Public high school
- Established: 1923 (103 years ago)
- School district: Bayfield 10JT-R
- CEEB code: 060085
- NCES School ID: 080240000090
- Principal: Marcie Ham
- Teaching staff: 33.43 (on an FTE basis)
- Grades: 9–12
- Enrollment: 422 (2023–2024)
- Student to teacher ratio: 12.62
- Colors: Purple, gold, black
- Athletics conference: CHSAA
- Mascot: Wolverine
- Feeder schools: Bayfield Middle School
- Website: bhs.bayfield.k12.co.us

Bayfield High School is a public high school located in Bayfield, Colorado.

== Athletics ==
=== Teams ===
Bayfield's athletic teams are nicknamed the Wolverines and the school's colors are purple, black, and gold. Bayfield teams compete in the following sports:

- The Marching Wolverines
- Baseball
- Boys basketball
- Boys soccer
- Football
- Girls basketball
- Girls soccer
- Track & field
- Volleyball
- Wrestling

=== State championships ===
- Cross Country
  - 2005 Colorado Class 3A Boys State Champions
- Boys basketball
  - 2018 Colorado Class 3A State Champions
- Football
  - 1996 Colorado Class 2A State Champions
  - 2015 Colorado Class 2A State Champions
  - 2017 Colorado Class 2A State Champions
- Track & field
  - 1991 Colorado Class 2A Girls State Champions
  - 2018 Colorado Class 3A Boys State Champions

== Demographics ==
81% of the student population at Bayfield High School identify as Caucasian, 15% identify as Hispanic, 2% identify as American Indian/Alaskin Native, 2% identify as multiracial, 1% identify as Asian, and 0.3% identify as Hawaiian Native/Pacific Islander. The student body makeup is 57% male and 43% female.
