= Cecil Sapp =

American football player (born 1978)

No. 37, 33, 32
- Positions: Fullback, running back

Personal information
- Born: December 23, 1978 (age 47); Miami, Florida, U.S.
- Listed height: 5 ft 11 in (1.80 m)
- Listed weight: 229 lb (104 kg)

Career information
- High school: Miami Palmetto (FL)
- College: Colorado State
- NFL draft: 2003: undrafted

Career history
- Denver Broncos (2003–2007); Houston Texans (2008); New York Sentinels (2009)

Awards and highlights
- 2× First-team All-Mountain West (2000, 2002)

Career NFL statistics
- Rushing yards: 220
- Rushing average: 4.3
- Rushing touchdowns: 2
- Receptions: 24
- Receiving yards: 102
- Receiving touchdowns: 1
- Stats at Pro Football Reference

Cecil Sapp (born December 23, 1978) is an American former professional football player who was a fullback in the National Football League (NFL). He was signed by the Denver Broncos as an undrafted free agent in 2003. He played college football at Colorado State. Sapp also played for the Houston Texans and New York Sentinels.

== Early life ==
Sapp played high school football at Miami Palmetto Senior High School, earning first-team all-conference and honorable mention all-state honors his senior year.

== College career ==
Sapp played college football for the Colorado State Rams from 1999 to 2002. He rushed three times for 40 yards and one touchdown his freshman season in 1999. He totaled 151 rushing attempts for 841 yards and 10 touchdowns in 2000, earning first-team all-Mountain West Conference honors. Sapp also caught three passes for 47 yards and one touchdown.

He missed the 2001 season after having surgery to remove a tumor from his heel. He rushed 347 times for 1,601 yards and 17 touchdowns his senior year in 2002, garnering unanimous first-team all-Mountain West recognition.

Sapp was invited to the Senior Bowl and Hula Bowl after his senior season. He was inducted into the Colorado State University Athletics Hall of Fame in 2017.

== Professional career ==
=== Denver Broncos ===
Sapp was signed by the Denver Broncos as an undrafted free agent on May 8, 2003. He was waived on August 31, and signed to the Broncos' practice squad on September 2. Sapp was promoted to the active roster on December 26, 2003, and played in one game for the Broncos during the 2003 season, rushing 12 times for 31 yards.

He was waived on September 5, 2004, and signed to the practice squad on September 7. He was promoted to the active roster on October 27, 2004. Sapp appeared in five games for the Broncos in 2004, totaling four carries for 32 yards, one kick return for 34 yards, one solo tackle and one assisted tackle.

Sapp played in all 16 games for the Broncos in 2005, recording five rushing attempts for 21 yards, two receptions for 17 yards, two kick returns for 28 yards, two fumble recoveries, six solo tackles and one assisted tackle. He appeared in 11 games, including his first career start, during the 2006 season, rushing 10 times for 80 yards, catching five passes for 34 yards, returning four kicks for 95 yards and recovering one fumble while also making four solo tackles and two assisted tackles. He was placed on injured reserve on December 4, 2006.

Sapp played in 16 games, including a career-high 8 starts, for the Broncos in 2007, accumulating 18 rushing attempts for 59 yards and two touchdowns, 14 receptions for 51 yards and one touchdown, two kick returns for 30 yards and six solo tackles. He re-signed with the Broncos on March 24, 2008. He was placed on injured reserve on August 30 and released on September 4, 2008.

=== Houston Texans ===
Sapp signed with the Houston Texans on September 30, 2008. He appeared in 12 games for the Texans during the 2008 season, totaling two rushes for -3 yards, one kick return for seven yards and five solo tackles.

=== New York Sentinels ===
Sapp played in four games, starting two, for the New York Sentinels of the United Football League in 2009, rushing 15 times for 89 yards, returning one kick for 21 yards, losing one fumble and making one tackle.
