= List of Utah Utes football All-Americans =

Utah Utes football All-Americans are collegiate football players who have been named as All-Americans while playing for the University of Utah football team.

== Overview ==
Utah has produced 4 unanimous and 9 consensus all-americans in the history of the football program. Tom Hackett is the only player who has been selected as a unanimous or consensus All-American twice. Luther Elliss (1994) is the father of Jonah Elliss (2023).

== Sortable chart of Utah's All-Americans ==
†	Unanimous
^	Consensus
*	First-Team

Year	Player	Position	Selectors
1930	Marwin Jonas	C	DW-3
1930	Earl Pomeroy	FB	AP-3; DW-1
1930	Frank Christensen	HB	INS-3; NEA-3 [FB]
1932	Frank Christensen*	FB	UP-1; NEA-3; CP-3
1941	Floyd Spendlove	T	NEA-3
1947	Banard Hafen	E	INS-3
1957	Lee Grosscup*	QB	AP-2, FWAA, INS-2, NEA-1, UP-2
1964	Roy Jefferson	DE	NEA-3, FN [end]
1964	Roy Jefferson	DB	Time, SN, FN
1970	Norm Thompson	DB	AP-2
1970	Marv Bateman*	P	FWAA [K], TSN
1971	Marv Bateman	P	TSN, Time
1973	Steve Odom*	RS	FWAA
1980	Jeff Griffin	DB	NEA-2
1981	Steve Clark*	DL	FWAA, NEA-2 [DT]
1984	Carlton Walker*	G	AP-2, FWAA, NEA-1
1985	Erroll Tucker*	RS	FWAA, GNS, TSN
1994	Luther Elliss^	DL	AP-1, Walter Camp, FWAA-Writers, AFCA-Coaches, Scripps-Howard, Sporting News
1994	Anthony Brown	OL	AP-3
2002	Jordan Gross^	OL	AP, FWAA, WCFF, PFW, CNNSI, ESPN
2004	Alex Smith*	QB	FWAA, SN, SI, PFW, CBS, CFN, AP-2, WCFF-2
2004	Chris Kemoeatu*	DL	FWAA, SI, PFW, CBS, CFN, AP-2
2004	Morgan Scalley	DB	CBS, AP-2
2006	Eric Weddle^	DB	AFCA-Coaches, Sporting News, Sports Illustrated, CBS Sports, College Football News, Rivals.com, AP-2, Walter Camp-2
2007	Louie Sakoda*	K	Rivals.com
2007	Louie Sakoda*	P	FWAA-Writers, CBS Sports
2008	Louie Sakoda^	K	AFCA, AP, FWAA, TSN, WCFF, ESPN, PFW, SI
2009	Zane Beadles*	OL	FWAA, CFN, WCFF-2, TSN-3
2010	Caleb Schlauderaff	G	WCFF-2, AP-3
2010	Shaky Smithson*	KR	WCFF, CFN, Scout.com
2012	Reggie Dunn	KR	CBS, ESPN, Scout-2
2012	Star Lotulelei*	DL	AP, WCFF, Scout
2014	Kaelin Clay*	PR	TSN, CBS, FOX-1
2014	Nate Orchard*	DL	WCFF, FWAA, ESPN, Scout, SI
2014	Tom Hackett^	P	AP, WCFF, AFCA, FWAA, CBS, Scout, FOX
2015	Tom Hackett†	P	AP-1, WCFF-1, FWAA, TSN-1, AFCA, USAT, SI, ESPN, Athlon
2016	Mitch Wishnowsky†	P	AFCA, FWAA, AP, WCFF, TSN, SI, USAT, ESPN, FOX
2017	Matt Gay^	K	AP, FWAA, TSN, SI, USAT, ESPN, CFN, Athlon
2019	Bradlee Anae^	DL	AFCA, ESPN, FWAA, Phil Steele, SI, USAT, TSN, WCFF
2019	Julian Blackmon	DB	Athletic, SI
2021	Britain Covey*	PR	CBS/247
2021	Devin Lloyd^	LB	AP, CBS, ESPN, FWAA, The Athletic, TSN, USAT, WCFF
2022	Clark Phillips III †	CB	AP, AFCA, FWAA, TSN, WCFF, CBS, FOX, The Athletic, USAT
2023	Jonah Elliss^	DL	FWAA, TSN, WCFF, FOX, Phil Steele
2023	Sione Vaki	AP	FOX-1
2024	Spencer Fano	OL	PFF
2025	John Henry Daley	DL	WCFF
2025	Spencer Fano †	OL	AFCA, AP, FWAA, TSN, WCFF, Athletic, CBS, SI, USAT
