= List of Utah Utes in the NFL draft =

This is a list of Utah Utes football players in the NFL draft.

== Key ==
| B | Back | K | Kicker | NT | Nose tackle |
| C | Center | LB | Linebacker | FB | Fullback |
| DB | Defensive back | P | Punter | HB | Halfback |
| DE | Defensive end | QB | Quarterback | WR | Wide receiver |
| DT | Defensive tackle | RB | Running back | G | Guard |
| E | End | T | Offensive tackle | TE | Tight end |

| = Pro Bowler | = Hall of Famer |

== Selections ==
| Year | Round | Pick | Overall | Player | Team | Position |
|---|---|---|---|---|---|---|
| 1938 | 6 | 6 | 46 | Karl Schleckman | Detroit Lions | T |
| 1938 | 9 | 4 | 74 | Paul McDonough | Pittsburgh Steelers | E |
| 1939 | 6 | 3 | 43 | Barney McGarry | Cleveland Rams | T |
| 1940 | 9 | 1 | 71 | Luke Pappas | Chicago Cardinals | T |
| 1940 | 10 | 7 | 87 | Tom Pace | Chicago Bears | B |
| 1940 | 14 | 5 | 125 | Pete Bogden | Cleveland Rams | E |
| 1942 | 8 | 1 | 61 | Floyd Spendlove | Pittsburgh Steelers | T |
| 1942 | 15 | 5 | 135 | Mac Speedie | Detroit Lions | E |
| 1943 | 18 | 5 | 165 | Bert Davis | Cleveland Rams | C |
| 1943 | 32 | 4 | 299 | Woody Peterson | Chicago Bears | B |
| 1944 | 4 | 3 | 30 | George Betteridge | Detroit Lions | B |
| 1944 | 27 | 7 | 281 | Nick Pappas | Washington Redskins | T |
| 1945 | 31 | 5 | 323 | Bill Broderick | New York Giants | T |
| 1946 | 5 | 9 | 39 | Gay Adelt | Washington Redskins | B |
| 1946 | 13 | 4 | 114 | Reed Nostrum | Chicago Bears | T |
| 1946 | 15 | 5 | 135 | Stan Stapley | New York Giants | T |
| 1946 | 19 | 7 | 177 | Lawrence Mauss | Philadelphia Eagles | C |
| 1946 | 30 | 7 | 287 | Tom Panos | Detroit Lions | G |
| 1947 | 32 | 4 | 297 | Ralph Olsen | Green Bay Packers | E |
| 1948 | 19 | 2 | 167 | Barney Hafen | Detroit Lions | E |
| 1948 | 20 | 4 | 179 | Dewey Frank Nelson | Boston Yanks | B |
| 1948 | 22 | 7 | 202 | Tally Stevens | Pittsburgh Steelers | E |
| 1949 | 4 | 3 | 34 | Bob Summerhays | Green Bay Packers | B |
| 1949 | 22 | 1 | 212 | Gil Tobler | Detroit Lions | B |
| 1950 | 20 | 6 | 254 | Joe Tangaro | New York Giants | T |
| 1951 | 23 | 8 | 275 | Dave Cunningham | New York Yanks | B |
| 1952 | 7 | 9 | 82 | Wes Gardener | Detroit Lions | C |
| 1952 | 8 | 8 | 93 | Tom Dublinski | Detroit Lions | B |
| 1953 | 13 | 8 | 153 | Ray Westort | Philadelphia Eagles | G |
| 1953 | 17 | 10 | 203 | George Bean | Cleveland Browns | B |
| 1953 | 21 | 2 | 243 | Jim Dublinski | Washington Redskins | C |
| 1954 | 7 | 12 | 85 | Jack Cross | Detroit Lions | B |
| 1954 | 16 | 8 | 189 | Charlie Grant | Philadelphia Eagles | C |
| 1954 | 19 | 6 | 223 | Don Rydalch | Pittsburgh Steelers | B |
| 1954 | 20 | 12 | 241 | Jim Durrant | Detroit Lions | G |
| 1955 | 13 | 11 | 156 | Don Henderson | Detroit Lions | T |
| 1955 | 24 | 1 | 278 | Max Pierce | Chicago Cardinals | B |
| 1956 | 5 | 4 | 53 | Herb Nakken | Los Angeles Rams | B |
| 1956 | 26 | 12 | 313 | Jack Kammerman | Cleveland Browns | E |
| 1958 | 6 | 4 | 65 | Merrill Douglas | Chicago Bears | B |
| 1958 | 21 | 6 | 247 | Everett Jones | Pittsburgh Steelers | G |
| 1958 | 23 | 10 | 275 | Larry Fields | San Francisco 49ers | B |
| 1959 | 1 | 10 | 10 | Lee Grosscup | New York Giants | QB |
| 1960 | 7 | 2 | 74 | Larry Wilson | St. Louis Cardinals | DB |
| 1960 | 18 | 12 | 216 | Tony Polychronis | New York Giants | T |
| 1961 | 14 | 1 | 183 | Ken Petersen | Minnesota Vikings | T |
| 1961 | 17 | 6 | 230 | Terry Nofsinger | Pittsburgh Steelers | QB |
| 1962 | 2 | 8 | 22 | Ed Pine | San Francisco 49ers | C |
| 1963 | 3 | 1 | 29 | Dave Costa | Los Angeles Rams | G |
| 1963 | 11 | 14 | 154 | Marv Fleming | Green Bay Packers | TE |
| 1963 | 15 | 6 | 202 | Jerry Overton | Dallas Cowboys | DB |
| 1964 | 10 | 13 | 139 | Allen Jacobs | Green Bay Packers | B |
| 1964 | 16 | 13 | 223 | Andrew Ireland | Green Bay Packers | B |
| 1965 | 2 | 4 | 18 | Roy Jefferson | Pittsburgh Steelers | WR |
| 1965 | 7 | 8 | 92 | Greg Kent | Detroit Lions | T |
| 1965 | 7 | 12 | 96 | Frank Roy | St. Louis Cardinals | E |
| 1965 | 14 | 2 | 184 | Frank Andruski | San Francisco 49ers | RB |
| 1966 | 12 | 5 | 175 | John Stipech | Washington Redskins | LB |
| 1967 | 5 | 23 | 130 | Richard Tate | Green Bay Packers | DB |
| 1967 | 15 | 17 | 384 | Ben Woodson | Oakland Raiders | RB |
| 1968 | 4 | 27 | 110 | Charles Smith | Oakland Raiders | RB |
| 1968 | 10 | 5 | 251 | Jerome Lawson | Buffalo Bills | DB |
| 1968 | 10 | 19 | 265 | Jack Gehrke | Kansas City Chiefs | WR |
| 1968 | 12 | 1 | 301 | Bob Trumpy | Cincinnati Bengals | TE |
| 1969 | 3 | 5 | 57 | Louis Thomas | Cincinnati Bengals | WR |
| 1969 | 4 | 11 | 89 | Norman McBride | Miami Dolphins | LB |
| 1969 | 11 | 19 | 279 | Gary Kerl | St. Louis Cardinals | LB |
| 1970 | 13 | 16 | 328 | Dave Smith | Green Bay Packers | RB |
| 1970 | 14 | 7 | 345 | Ray Groth | St. Louis Cardinals | WR |
| 1971 | 1 | 17 | 17 | Norm Thompson | St. Louis Cardinals | DB |
| 1971 | 16 | 4 | 394 | Billy Hunter | Buffalo Bills | DB |
| 1971 | 17 | 20 | 436 | Gordon Jolley | Detroit Lions | T |
| 1972 | 3 | 26 | 78 | Marv Bateman | Dallas Cowboys | P |
| 1972 | 16 | 26 | 416 | Gordon Longmire | Dallas Cowboys | QB |
| 1973 | 8 | 3 | 185 | Bob Peterson | New Orleans Saints | G |
| 1974 | 5 | 12 | 116 | Steve Odom | Green Bay Packers | WR |
| 1974 | 8 | 15 | 197 | Ron Rydalch | New York Jets | DT |
| 1974 | 13 | 25 | 337 | Gary Keller | Minnesota Vikings | DT |
| 1974 | 14 | 23 | 361 | Don Van Galder | Washington Redskins | QB |
| 1975 | 11 | 25 | 285 | Ike Spencer | Minnesota Vikings | RB |
| 1975 | 13 | 5 | 317 | Willie Armstead | Cleveland Browns | WR |
| 1976 | 16 | 15 | 446 | John Huddleston | Denver Broncos | LB |
| 1979 | 8 | 16 | 208 | Rick Partridge | Green Bay Packers | P |
| 1980 | 10 | 19 | 268 | Lewis Walker | Washington Redskins | RB |
| 1981 | 2 | 27 | 55 | Dean Miraldi | Philadelphia Eagles | G |
| 1981 | 3 | 5 | 61 | Jeff Griffin | St. Louis Cardinals | DB |
| 1981 | 10 | 13 | 261 | Steve Folsom | Miami Dolphins | TE |
| 1982 | 2 | 28 | 55 | Darryl Haley | New England Patriots | T |
| 1982 | 3 | 16 | 71 | Del Rodgers | Green Bay Packers | RB |
| 1982 | 6 | 5 | 144 | Jack Campbell | Seattle Seahawks | T |
| 1982 | 9 | 16 | 239 | Steve Clark | Miami Dolphins | DE |
| 1982 | 10 | 25 | 276 | Wayne Jones | Miami Dolphins | T |
| 1984 | 5 | 15 | 127 | Andy Parker | Los Angeles Raiders | TE |
| 1986 | 5 | 12 | 122 | Erroll Tucker | Pittsburgh Steelers | DB |
| 1986 | 8 | 6 | 200 | Filipo Mokofisi | New Orleans Saints | LB |
| 1990 | 4 | 12 | 93 | Scott Mitchell | Miami Dolphins | QB |
| 1992 | 11 | 21 | 301 | Anthony Davis | Houston Oilers | LB |
| 1994 | 4 | 2 | 105 | Kurt Haws | Washington Redskins | TE |
| 1994 | 7 | 7 | 201 | Jamal Anderson | Atlanta Falcons | RB |
| 1995 | 1 | 20 | 20 | Luther Elliss | Detroit Lions | DT |
| 1995 | 5 | 31 | 165 | Lance Scott | Arizona Cardinals | C |
| 1995 | 7 | 11 | 219 | Curtis Marsh Sr. | Jacksonville Jaguars | WR |
| 1995 | 7 | 31 | 239 | Bronzell Miller | St. Louis Rams | DE |
| 1996 | 7 | 37 | 246 | Henry Lusk | New Orleans Saints | TE |
| 1998 | 1 | 16 | 16 | Kevin Dyson | Tennessee Titans | WR |
| 1998 | 6 | 25 | 178 | Chris Fuamatu-Maʻafala | Pittsburgh Steelers | RB |
| 1999 | 7 | 16 | 222 | Phil Glover | Tennessee Titans | LB |
| 2000 | 6 | 12 | 178 | John Frank | Philadelphia Eagles | DE |
| 2000 | 6 | 23 | 189 | Mike Anderson | Denver Broncos | RB |
| 2000 | 7 | 12 | 218 | Richard Seals | New York Jets | DT |
| 2001 | 2 | 29 | 60 | Andre Dyson | Tennessee Titans | DB |
| 2001 | 3 | 12 | 74 | Steve Smith Sr. | Carolina Panthers | WR |
| 2002 | 3 | 22 | 87 | Cliff Russell | Washington Redskins | WR |
| 2002 | 4 | 34 | 132 | Ed Taʻamu | Minnesota Vikings | G |
| 2003 | 1 | 8 | 8 | Jordan Gross | Carolina Panthers | T |
| 2003 | 6 | 14 | 187 | Lauvale Sape | Buffalo Bills | DT |
| 2003 | 7 | 44 | 258 | Antwoine Sanders | Baltimore Ravens | DB |
| 2005 | 1 | 1 | 1 | Alex Smith | San Francisco 49ers | QB |
| 2005 | 3 | 24 | 88 | Sione Pouha | New York Jets | DT |
| 2005 | 6 | 30 | 204 | Chris Kemoeatu | Pittsburgh Steelers | G |
| 2005 | 7 | 11 | 225 | Paris Warren | Tampa Bay Buccaneers | WR |
| 2005 | 7 | 19 | 233 | Jonathan Fanene | Cincinnati Bengals | DE |
| 2006 | 7 | 37 | 245 | Spencer Toone | Tennessee Titans | LB |
| 2006 | 7 | 38 | 246 | Quinton Ganther | Tennessee Titans | RB |
| 2007 | 2 | 5 | 37 | Eric Weddle | San Diego Chargers | DB |
| 2007 | 4 | 9 | 108 | Paul Soliai | Miami Dolphins | DT |
| 2009 | 2 | 25 | 57 | Paul Kruger | Baltimore Ravens | DE |
| 2009 | 2 | 29 | 61 | Sean Smith | Miami Dolphins | DB |
| 2009 | 6 | 15 | 188 | Brice McCain | Houston Texans | DB |
| 2009 | 7 | 43 | 252 | Freddie Brown | Cincinnati Bengals | WR |
| 2010 | 2 | 8 | 40 | Koa Misi | Miami Dolphins | LB |
| 2010 | 2 | 13 | 45 | Zane Beadles | Denver Broncos | G |
| 2010 | 5 | 17 | 148 | Robert Johnson | Tennessee Titans | DB |
| 2010 | 5 | 25 | 156 | David Reed | Baltimore Ravens | WR |
| 2010 | 5 | 35 | 166 | Stevenson Sylvester | Pittsburgh Steelers | LB |
| 2010 | 7 | 16 | 223 | R. J. Stanford | Carolina Panthers | DB |
| 2011 | 5 | 8 | 139 | Brandon Burton | Minnesota Vikings | DB |
| 2011 | 6 | 14 | 179 | Caleb Schlauderaff | Green Bay Packers | G |
| 2012 | 3 | 32 | 95 | Tony Bergstrom | Oakland Raiders | G |
| 2013 | 1 | 14 | 14 | Star Lotulelei | Carolina Panthers | DT |
| 2013 | 7 | 6 | 212 | Joe Kruger | Philadelphia Eagles | DE |
| 2014 | 4 | 16 | 116 | Keith McGill | Oakland Raiders | DB |
| 2014 | 7 | 18 | 233 | Trevor Reilly | New York Jets | LB |
| 2015 | 2 | 15 | 47 | Eric Rowe | Philadelphia Eagles | DB |
| 2015 | 2 | 19 | 51 | Nate Orchard | Cleveland Browns | LB |
| 2015 | 3 | 2 | 66 | Jeremiah Poutasi | Tennessee Titans | G |
| 2015 | 6 | 8 | 184 | Kaelin Clay | Tampa Bay Buccaneers | WR |
| 2016 | 4 | 38 | 136 | Devontae Booker | Denver Broncos | RB |
| 2017 | 1 | 20 | 20 | Garett Bolles | Denver Broncos | T |
| 2017 | 2 | 10 | 42 | Marcus Williams | New Orleans Saints | DB |
| 2017 | 4 | 15 | 121 | Joe Williams | San Francisco 49ers | RB |
| 2017 | 5 | 20 | 164 | Isaac Asiata | Miami Dolphins | G |
| 2017 | 5 | 30 | 173 | Brian Allen | Pittsburgh Steelers | DB |
| 2017 | 5 | 33 | 176 | J. J. Dielman | Cincinnati Bengals | C |
| 2017 | 6 | 6 | 190 | Sam Tevi | Los Angeles Chargers | T |
| 2017 | 6 | 18 | 202 | Pita Taumoepenu | San Francisco 49ers | LB |
| 2018 | 6 | 7 | 181 | Kylie Fitts | Chicago Bears | DE |
| 2019 | 2 | 15 | 47 | Marquise Blair | Seattle Seahawks | DB |
| 2019 | 3 | 24 | 88 | Cody Barton | Seattle Seahawks | LB |
| 2019 | 4 | 8 | 110 | Mitch Wishnowsky | San Francisco 49ers | P |
| 2019 | 5 | 7 | 145 | Matt Gay | Tampa Bay Buccaneers | K |
| 2019 | 7 | 26 | 240 | Jackson Barton | Indianapolis Colts | T |
2020
| 2020 | 2 | 18 | 50 | Jaylon Johnson | Chicago Bears | DB |
| 2020 | 3 | 21 | 85 | Julian Blackmon | Indianapolis Colts | DB |
| 2020 | 3 | 22 | 86 | Zack Moss | Buffalo Bills | RB |
| 2020 | 3 | 40 | 104 | Terrell Burgess | Los Angeles Rams | DB |
| 2020 | 4 | 8 | 114 | Leki Fotu | Arizona Cardinals | DT |
| 2020 | 5 | 33 | 179 | Bradlee Anae | Dallas Cowboys | DE |
| 2020 | 6 | 19 | 197 | John Penisini | Detroit Lions | DT |
| 2022 | 1 | 27 | 27 | Devin Lloyd | Jacksonville Jaguars | LB |
| 2023 | 1 | 25 | 25 | Dalton Kincaid | Buffalo Bills | TE |
| 2023 | 4 | 11 | 113 | Clark Phillips III | Atlanta Falcons | DB |
| 2023 | 4 | 16 | 118 | Braeden Daniels | Washington Commanders | G |
| 2024 | 2 | 28 | 60 | Cole Bishop | Buffalo Bills | DB |
| 2024 | 3 | 12 | 76 | Jonah Elliss | Denver Broncos | DE |
| 2024 | 4 | 32 | 132 | Sione Vaki | Detroit Lions | RB |
| 2024 | 6 | 3 | 179 | Sataoa Laumea | Seattle Seahawks | G |
| 2024 | 7 | 15 | 235 | Devaughn Vele | Denver Broncos | WR |
| 2025 | 7 | 25 | 241 | Caleb Lohner | Denver Broncos | TE |
| 2026 | 1 | 9 | 9 | Spencer Fano | Cleveland Browns | OL |
| 2026 | 1 | 28 | 28 | Caleb Lomu | New England Patriots | OL |
| 2026 | 7 | 40 | 256 | Dallen Bentley | Denver Broncos | TE |

== Notable undrafted players ==
Note: No drafts held before 1920

| Year | Player | Position | Debut Team | Notes |
|---|---|---|---|---|
| 1964 | Monk Bailey | DB | St. Louis Cardinals | — |
| 1968 | Manny Fernandez | DT | Miami Dolphins | — |
| 1978 | Jack Steptoe | WR | Chicago Bears | — |
| 1979 | Roland Solomon | DB | Buffalo Bills | — |
| 1981 | Floyd Hodge | WR | Atlanta Falcons | — |
| 1983 | Dan Doubiago | T | Seattle Seahawks | — |
| 1983 | Carl Monroe | RB | San Francisco 49ers | — |
| 1986 | Manny Hendrix | CB | Dallas Cowboys | — |
| 1987 | Craig McEwen | TE | Washington Redskins | — |
| 1987 | Kevin Reach | G/C | San Francisco 49ers | — |
| 1987 | Reggie Richardson | DB | Los Angeles Rams | — |
| 1987 | Mark Stevens | QB | San Francisco 49ers | — |
| 1989 | Dave Cullity | T | San Francisco 49ers | — |
| 1989 | Carl Harry | WR | Washington Redskins | — |
| 1990 | Dennis Smith | RB | Phoenix Cardinals | — |
| 1993 | Keith Embray | DE | San Diego Chargers | — |
| 1995 | Anthony Brown | T | Cincinnati Bengals | — |
| 1999 | Barry Sims | T/G | Oakland Raiders | — |
| 2001 | Andy Bowers | DE | Arizona Cardinals | — |
| 2002 | Dameon Hunter | RB | Baltimore Ravens | — |
| 2002 | Ma'ake Kemoeatu | DT | Baltimore Ravens | — |
| 2004 | Josh Savage | DE | Tampa Bay Buccaneers | — |
| 2006 | John Madsen | WR | Oakland Raiders | — |
| 2006 | Steve Fifita | DT | Miami Dolphins | — |
| 2007 | Brett Ratliff | QB | New York Jets | — |
| 2007 | Kelly Talavou | DT | Atlanta Falcons | — |
| 2011 | Matt Asiata | RB | Minnesota Vikings | — |
| 2011 | Sealver Siliga | DT | San Francisco 49ers | — |
| 2012 | Derrick Shelby | DE | Miami Dolphins | — |
| 2013 | Sam Brenner | C | Miami Dolphins | — |
| 2014 | Anthony Denham | TE | Houston Texans | — |
| 2014 | Tenny Palepoi | DT | San Diego Chargers | — |
| 2016 | Jared Norris | LB | Carolina Panthers | — |
| 2017 | Tim Patrick | WR | Baltimore Ravens | — |
| 2022 | Britain Covey | WR | Philadelphia Eagles | — |
| 2025 | Micah Bernard | RB | Tennessee Titans | — |
| 2025 | Karene Reid | LB | Denver Broncos | — |
| 2025 | Dorian Singer | WR | Jacksonville Jaguars | — |
| 2025 | Junior Tafuna | DT | Houston Texans | — |
| 2025 | Zemaiah Vaughn | CB | Minnesota Vikings | — |
| 2026 | Lander Barton | LB | Los Angeles Chargers | — |
| 2026 | Logan Fano | DL | Cleveland Browns | — |
| 2026 | Jaren Kump | OL | Chicago Bears | — |
| 2026 | Tanoa Togiai | G | Washington Commanders | — |
