= Dennis Smith (tight end) =

American football player (born 1967)

No. 35, 30
- Position: H-back

Personal information
- Born: February 14, 1967 (age 59); Hemet, California, U.S.
- Listed height: 6 ft 0 in (1.83 m)
- Listed weight: 230 lb (104 kg)

Career information
- High school: Hemet
- College: Utah (1986–1989)
- NFL draft: 1990: undrafted

Career history
- Phoenix Cardinals (1990); Orlando Thunder (1991)

Awards and highlights
- First-team All-WAC (1988); Second-team All-WAC (1989)
- Stats at Pro Football Reference

Dennis Preston Smith (born February 14, 1967) is an American former professional football player who was an H-back for the Phoenix Cardinals of the National Football League (NFL). He played college football for the Utah Utes as a tight end. He holds the NCAA record for single-season receiving touchdowns by a tight end with 18.

== Early life ==
Dennis Preston Smith was born on February 14, 1967, in Hemet, California. He attended Hemet High School.

== College career ==
Smith was a four-year letterman for the Utah Utes of the University of Utah from 1986 to 1989. As a senior in 1989, he caught 73 passes for 1,091 yards and 18 touchdowns. His 73 receptions and 18 touchdown catches both set single-season national records for a tight end. Smith finished with career totals of 156 receptions for 2,168 yards and 24 touchdowns. His 24 touchdown catches were tied for the most ever in the country by a tight end. He also set the following school records for players of any position: career receptions (156), career touchdown receptions (24), single-season touchdown receptions (18), and single-game touchdown receptions (4).

== Professional career ==
After going undrafted in the 1990 NFL draft, Smith signed with the Phoenix Cardinals on April 30, 1990. He was listed as an H-back while with the Cardinals. He played in four games without recording any statistics, and was released by Phoenix on October 24, 1990.

Smith played in three games for the Orlando Thunder of the World League of American Football in 1991 but did not record any statistics.

== See also ==
- List of NCAA football records
