= Reggie Dunn =

American gridiron football player (born 1989)

No. 3
- Position: Wide receiver

Personal information
- Born: January 5, 1989 (age 37); Compton, California, U.S.
- Listed height: 5 ft 9 in (1.75 m)
- Listed weight: 178 lb (81 kg)

Career information
- High school: Watts (CA) Verbum Dei
- College: Utah
- NFL draft: 2013: undrafted

Career history
- Pittsburgh Steelers (2013)*; Green Bay Packers (2013)*; Cleveland Browns (2013)*; Miami Dolphins (2013)*; New England Patriots (2013–2014)*; Arizona Cardinals (2014)*; Dallas Cowboys (2014–2015)*; Ottawa Redblacks (2015–2016)*; Los Angeles KISS (2016)
- * Offseason or practice squad member only

Awards and highlights
- First-team All-Pac-12 (2012)
- Stats at Pro Football Reference

Reginald Francis Dunn, Jr. (born January 5, 1989) is an American former football wide receiver. He played college football for the Utah Utes of the University of Utah. In 2012, he set an NCAA record with four kickoff returns for touchdowns.

== High school ==
Dunn played at wide receiver, cornerback, and kick returner on the football team at Verbum Dei High School. As a junior, he had 604 all-purpose yards and 15 touchdowns. In his senior year, he had over 1,000 all-purpose yards with 15 touchdowns.

== College ==
Dunn played for Compton Community College in 2008, catching 14 passes for 193 yards and one touchdown. He then redshirted the 2009 season.

In 2010, Dunn joined the Utah Utes. He had four receptions for 70 yards, 12 rushes for 99 yards and two touchdowns, and 12 kick returns for 355 yards. He returned a kickoff 100 yards for a touchdown against Iowa State. The following season, he had 15 receptions for 211 yards, 15 rushes for 173 yards, and 26 kick returns for 614 yards. He had 37 rushing yards in the Sun Bowl.

In 2012, Dunn had 12 receptions for 74 yards, 13 rushing attempts for 58 yards, and 10 kick returns for 513 yards. He had two 100-yard kickoff returns against California to set an NCAA single-game record. A week later, he had a 100-yard kickoff return against Washington State. He then had another 100-yard kickoff return for a touchdown against Colorado. Dunn set NCAA records for kickoff returns for touchdowns in a season (four), 100-yard kickoff returns for touchdowns in a career (five), and 100-yard kickoff returns for touchdowns in a game (two). He was named to the All-Pac-12 first team.

== Professional career ==
=== 2013 Utah's Pro Day ===
Pre-draft measurables
Height	Weight	40-yard dash	10-yard split	20-yard split	20-yard shuttle	Three-cone drill	Vertical jump	Broad jump	Bench press
5 ft 9 in (1.75 m)	178 lb (81 kg)	4.24 s	1.52 s	2.49 s	4.34 s	6.82 s	36 in (0.91 m)	10 ft 1 in (3.07 m)	17 reps
All values from Central Florida Pro Day.

=== NFL ===
After going undrafted in the 2013 NFL draft Dunn signed with the Pittsburgh Steelers. He was signed to the Green Bay Packers' practice squad on September 30, 2013. Dunn was released from the Green Bay Packers' practice squad on October 10, 2013. Reggie Dunn was again signed to the Packers' practice squad on October 14, 2013. Dunn was signed to the Arizona Cardinals on July 25, 2014. The Cardinals released him on August 25, 2014. Dunn was signed to the Dallas Cowboys's practice squad on September 9, 2014.

=== CFL ===
Reggie Dunn signed with the Ottawa Redblacks of the Canadian Football League in mid-October 2015, near the end of the CFL season. Dunn was only active for one game and did not see any playing time. Dunn was invited to the teams spring mini-camp, however he declined citing he no longer wanted to pursue professional football. The Redblacks officially transferred his roster status to retired on April 27, 2015.

=== Los Angeles KISS ===
On June 16, 2016, Dunn was assigned to the Los Angeles KISS of the Arena Football League (AFL).

== Personal life ==
Dunn was born to Reginald and Jackie Dunn in Compton, California, on January 5, 1989. He has one younger brother. Dunn is a sociology major. He is 5 feet, 10 inches tall and weighs 172 pounds.
