= Tom Hackett =

Australian college football player (born 1992)

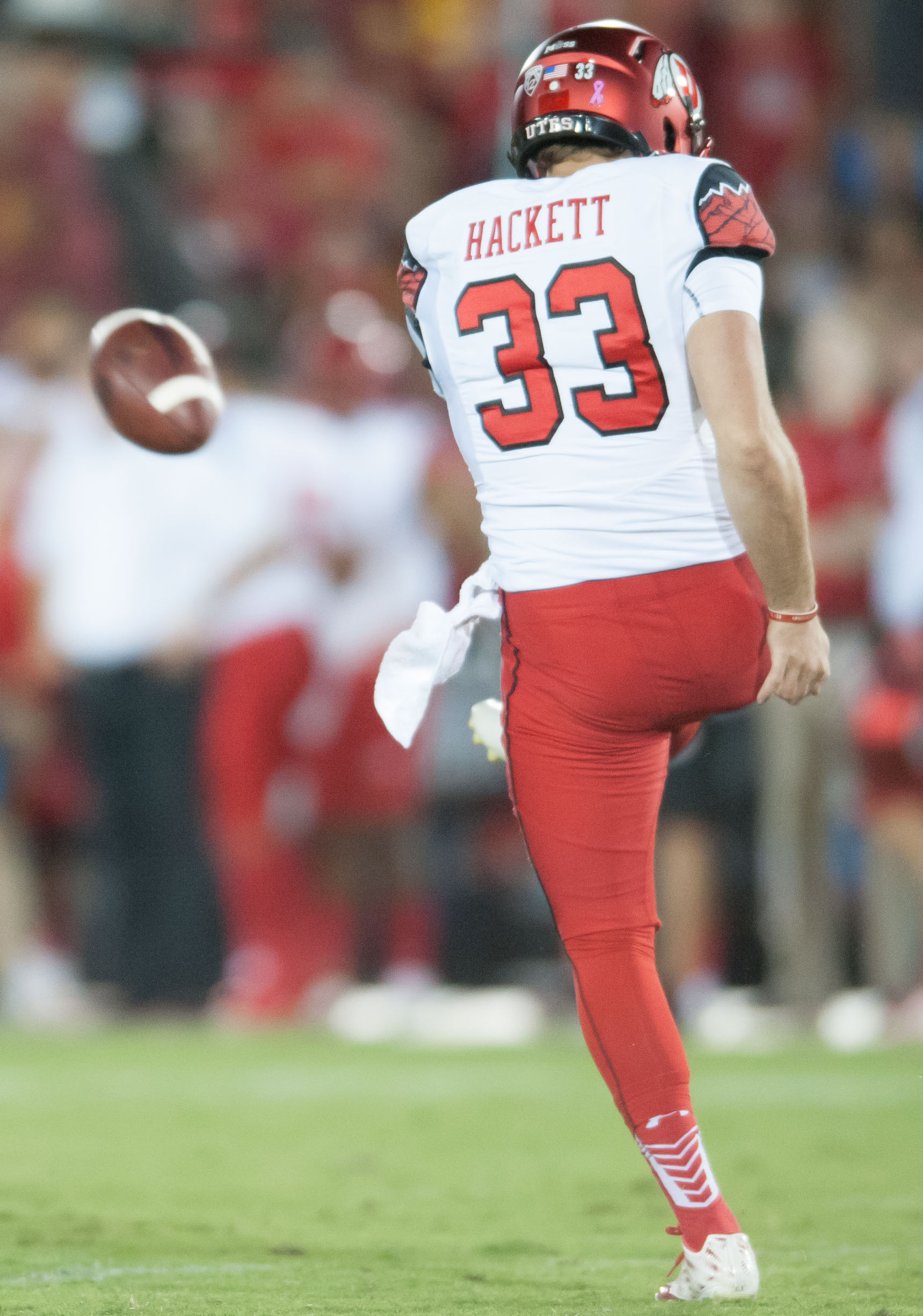
- Hackett with the Utah Utes in 2015

No. 6
- Position: Punter

Personal information
- Born: 10 May 1992 (age 34); Melbourne, Australia
- Listed height: 5 ft 11 in (1.80 m)
- Listed weight: 187 lb (85 kg)

Career information
- High school: Scotch (Melbourne)
- College: Utah (2012–2015)
- NFL draft: 2016: undrafted
- CFL draft: 2022G: 1st round, 6th overall pick

Career history
- New York Jets (2016)*; Winnipeg Blue Bombers (2022)*
- * Offseason or practice squad member only

Awards and highlights
- 2× Ray Guy Award (2014, 2015); Unanimous All-American (2015); Consensus All-American (2014); 3× First-team All-Pac-12 (2013–2015); Pac-12 All-Century Team
- Stats at Pro Football Reference

Tom Hackett (born 10 May 1992) is an Australian former college football punter for the Utah Utes. He was a two-time winner of the Ray Guy Award. He was signed as an undrafted free agent by the New York Jets in 2016, but never played in any NFL game.

== Professional career ==
Hackett signed as an undrafted free agent with the New York Jets on 1 May 2016. He was waived on 28 July 2016 after the team re-signed quarterback Ryan Fitzpatrick.

After being waived by the Jets, Hackett began co-hosting a sports radio show on KALL in Salt Lake City.

Hackett was selected in the first round (6th overall) in the 2022 CFL global draft by the Winnipeg Blue Bombers, signaling a potential return to professional play after six years. He briefly attended rookie minicamp with Winnipeg but returned to the United States amidst uncertainty regarding the player strikes prior to the 2022 CFL season.
