= Louie Sakoda =

American football player (born 1986)

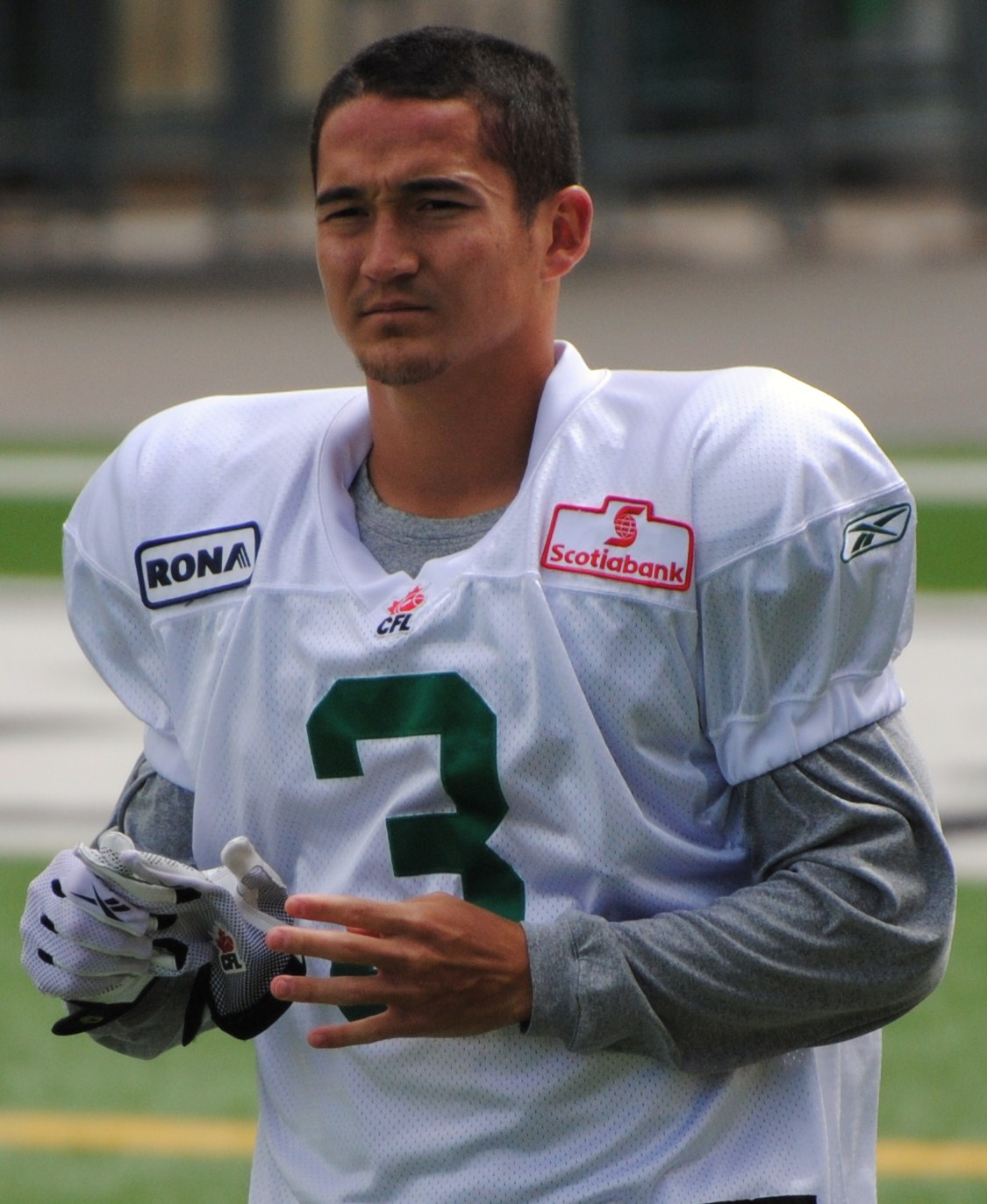
- Sakoda with the Saskatchewan Roughriders in 2010

No. 3
- Positions: Punter, Kicker

Personal information
- Born: October 28, 1986 (age 40); San Jose, California, U.S.
- Listed height: 5 ft 9 in (1.75 m)
- Listed weight: 175 lb (79 kg)

Career information
- High school: Branham
- College: Utah
- NFL draft: 2009: undrafted

Career history
- 2009: San Diego Chargers*
- 2009–2010: Saskatchewan Roughriders
- 2010: Winnipeg Blue Bombers*
- 2011: Edmonton Eskimos*
- * Offseason or practice squad member only

Awards and highlights
- Unanimous All-American (2008); First-team All-American (2007); 3× MW Special Teams Player of the Year (2006–2008) (Note: Co-winner with New Mexico Lobos placekicker Kenny Byrd in 2006.); 2× First-team All-MW (2007, 2008)
- Stats at CFL.ca

Louie Sakoda (born October 28, 1986) is an American former football kicker and punter. He played college football for the Utah Utes, earning unanimous All-American honors in 2008. Sakoda played professionally for the Saskatchewan Roughriders of the Canadian Football League (CFL).

== Early life ==
Sakoda was born in San Jose, California. He attended Branham High School in San Jose, and played high school football for the Branham Bruins.

== College career ==
=== Statistics ===
- Field Goal Pct.: .864 (1st)
- Field Goals Made: 57 (1st)
- Field Goal Attempts: 66 (1st)
- PAT Made: 137 (1st)
- PAT Attempts: 140 (1st)
- PAT Pct.: .979 (1st
- Scoring (Overall): 308 (1st)
- Scoring (Kick): 308 (1st)
- Punts: 242 (1st)
- Punt Yards: 10,188 (1st)
- Punt Average: 42.1 (1st)
- 50-yard Punts: 50 (1st)

=== Awards and honors ===
- 2007 Rivals.com first-team All-American kicker
- 2007 SI.com second-team All-American punter
- 2007 CBS Sports first-team All-American punter and Football Writers Association of America
- 2008 unanimous first-team All-American kicker (received the honor after being named to the Associated Press, American Football Coaches Association, Football Writers Association of America, Sporting News, and the Walter Camp Football Foundation teams)

== Professional career ==
Sakoda was signed as a free agent with the San Diego Chargers, but was released before the 2009 season. On October 14, 2009, he signed with the Saskatchewan Roughriders of the Canadian Football League. Sakoda was released by the Roughriders on August 2, 2010 after struggling at the start of the season. Sakoda was signed by the Winnipeg Blue Bombers on August 10, 2010. He was injured before playing a single game and was released by the Bombers on September 22, 2010. He was later signed by the Edmonton Eskimos on March 21, 2011 after the team traded away Justin Medlock that same day. On June 26, 2011, Sakoda was released from the Eskimos.
