= Erroll Tucker =

American gridiron football player (born 1964)

No. 22, 21, 20, 3
- Positions: Cornerback, return specialist

Personal information
- Born: July 6, 1964 (age 62); Pittsburgh, Pennsylvania, U.S.
- Listed height: 5 ft 8 in (1.73 m)
- Listed weight: 169 lb (77 kg)

Career information
- High school: Lynwood (Lynwood, California)
- College: Utah
- NFL draft: 1986: 5th round, 122nd overall pick

Career history
- Pittsburgh Steelers (1986); Buffalo Bills (1988–1989); New England Patriots (1989); Orlando Thunder (1991); Calgary Stampeders (1991–1992)

Awards and highlights
- Grey Cup champion (1992); All-World League (1991); First-team All-American (1985)

Career NFL statistics
- Fumble recoveries: 2
- Return yards: 991
- Stats at Pro Football Reference

Erroll Tucker (born July 6, 1964) is an American former professional football player who was a cornerback and return specialist in the National Football League (NFL). He was selected by the Pittsburgh Steelers in the fifth round of the 1986 NFL draft.

Tucker played college football for the Utah Utes. In 1985, he led the NCAA in punt returning with an average of 24.3 yards per return, and scored a total of 7 touchdowns on returns: 2 on punts, 2 on kickoffs, and 3 on interceptions. He was selected as a first-team All-American.

Tucker has also played for the Buffalo Bills, New England Patriots and Orlando Thunder. He finished his career with the Calgary Stampeders, winning a Grey Cup with them in 1992.

== See also ==
- List of NCAA major college yearly punt and kickoff return leaders
