= Nate Orchard =

American football player (born 1993)

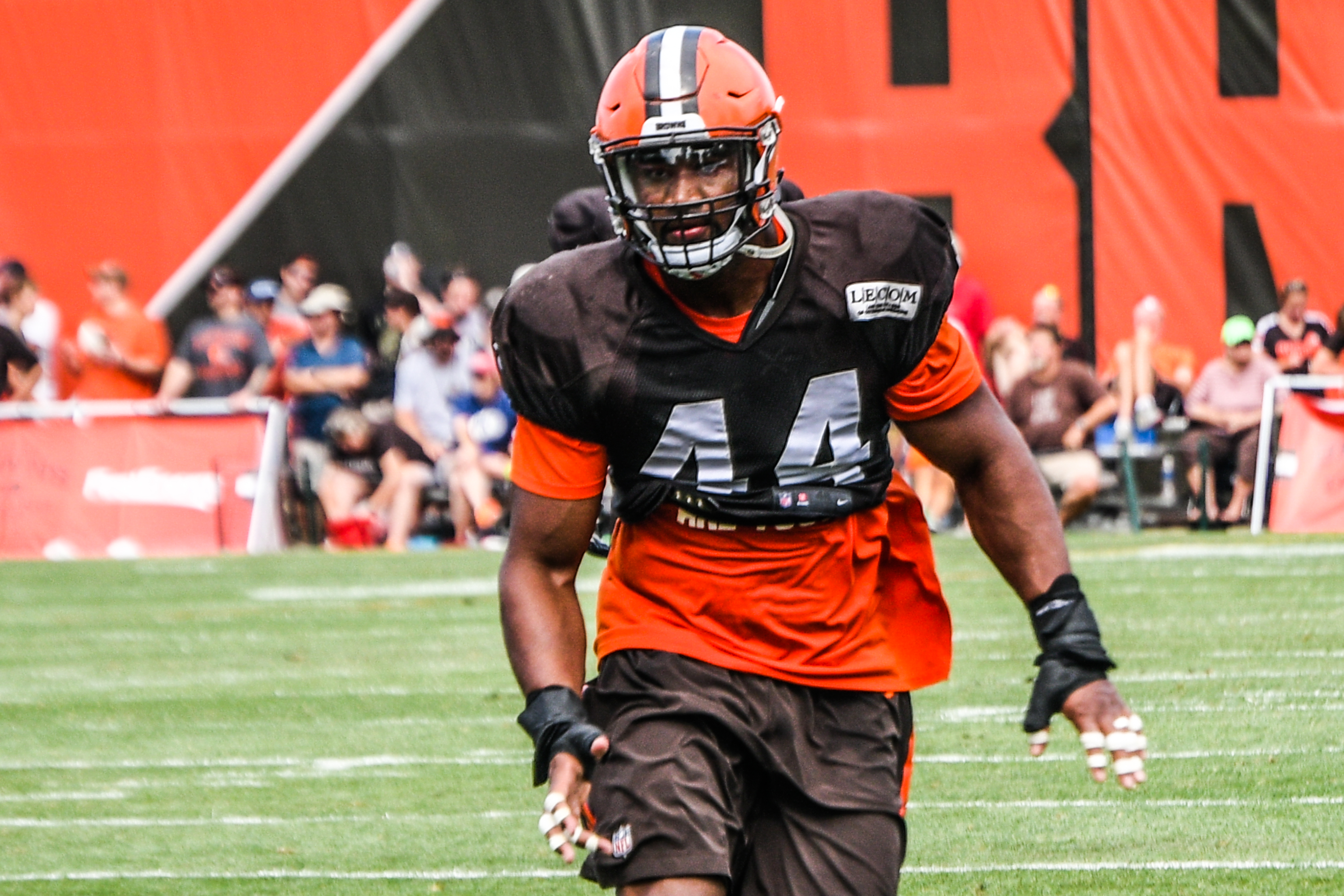
- Orchard with the Cleveland Browns in 2017

No. 44, 53, 54, 59, 43, 50
- Position: Defensive end

Personal information
- Born: January 5, 1993 (age 33); Los Angeles, California, U.S.
- Listed height: 6 ft 4 in (1.93 m)
- Listed weight: 251 lb (114 kg)

Career information
- High school: Highland (Salt Lake City, Utah)
- College: Utah (2011–2014)
- NFL draft: 2015: 2nd round, 51st overall pick

Career history
- Cleveland Browns (2015–2017); Buffalo Bills (2018); Kansas City Chiefs (2018); Seattle Seahawks (2019)*; Miami Dolphins (2019)*; Washington Redskins / Football Team (2019–2020); Houston Texans (2020); Tennessee Titans (2020–2021)*; Minnesota Vikings (2021)*; Green Bay Packers (2021)*; Washington Football Team (2021)
- * Offseason or practice squad member only

Awards and highlights
- Ted Hendricks Award (2014); Morris Trophy (2014); First-team All-Pac-12 (2014)

Career NFL statistics
- Total tackles: 85
- Sacks: 6
- Forced fumbles: 2
- Fumble recoveries: 2
- Pass deflections: 6
- Interceptions: 1
- Stats at Pro Football Reference

Nathaniel Fakahafua Orchard (born Napa'a Lilo Fakahafua on January 5, 1993) is an American former professional football player who was a defensive end in the National Football League (NFL). He played college football for the Utah Utes and was selected by the Cleveland Browns in the second round of the 2015 NFL draft. He was also a member of the Buffalo Bills, Kansas City Chiefs, Seattle Seahawks, Miami Dolphins, Washington Redskins / Football Team, Houston Texans, Tennessee Titans, Minnesota Vikings, and Green Bay Packers.

== Early life ==
Orchard is of Tongan descent. He attended Highland High School in Salt Lake City, Utah. He played football, basketball and competed in track. In football, he played as a wide receiver and defensive end. As a senior, he had 58 receptions for 1,351 yards and 17 touchdowns on offense and 62 tackles, 17.5 sacks and two interceptions on defense. In track & field, Orchard competed as a sprinter and posted personal-bests of 11.9 seconds in the 100-meter dash and 54.3 seconds in the 400-meter dash at the 2009 Region VI T&F Championships.

Considered a three-star recruit by Rivals.com, Orchard was ranked as the No. 60 wide receiver in his class.

== College career ==
As a true freshman at the University of Utah in 2011, Orchard played in all 13 games, recording four tackles. As a sophomore in 2012, he started 11 of the 12 games, recording 48 tackles, three sacks and a touchdown on a fumble recovery. As a junior in 2013, he started all 12 games, recording 49 tackles and 3.5 sacks. Orchard entered his senior season in 2014 as a starter. In his senior season, Orchard recorded 84 tackles, 21 tackles for loss, and 18.5 sacks. Orchard won the Ted Hendricks Award for his performance.

== Professional career ==
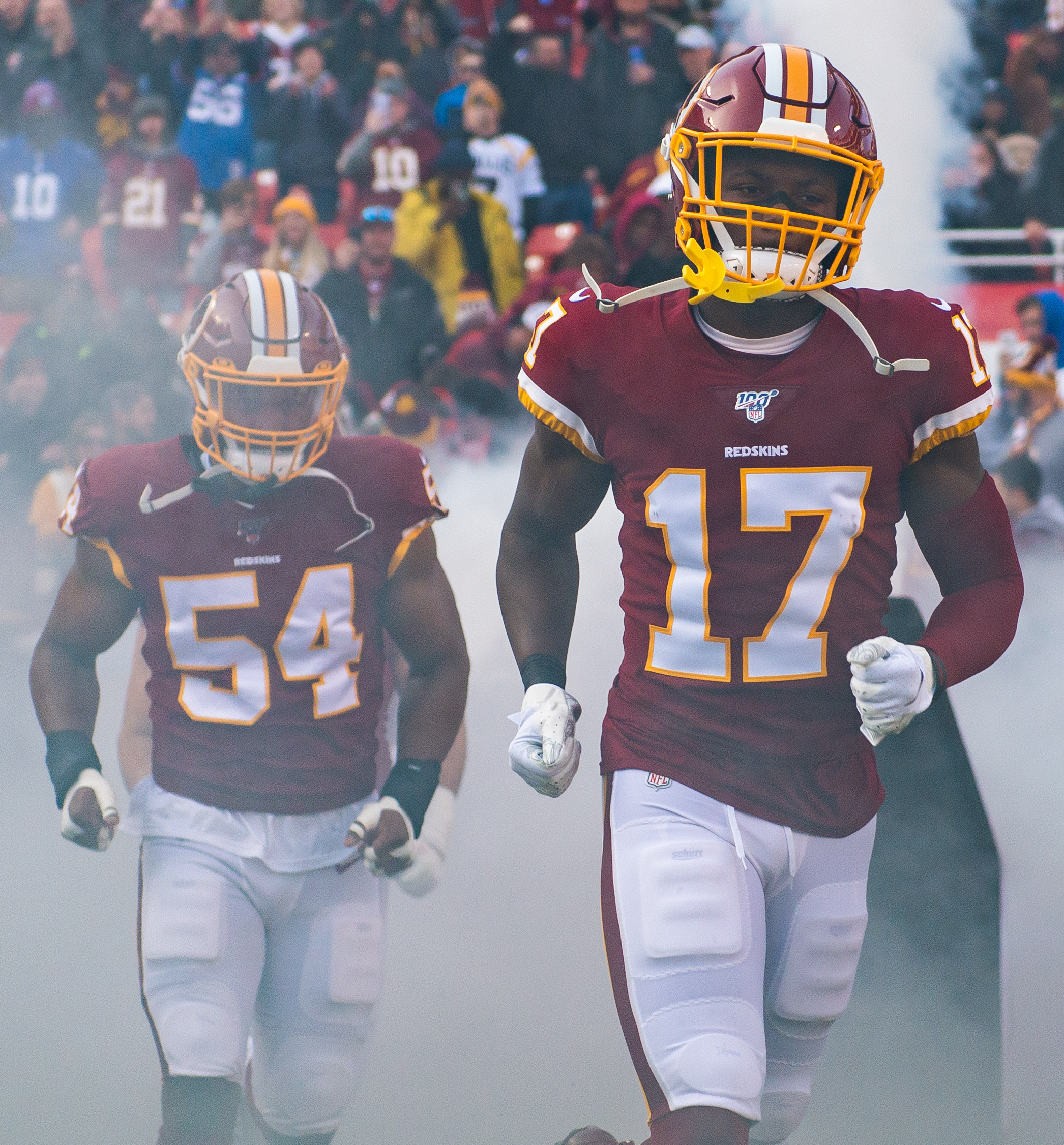
Orchard (left) with the Washington Redskins in 2019

=== Cleveland Browns ===
The Cleveland Browns picked Orchard in the second round of the 2015 NFL draft. On May 6, he signed a four-year contract worth $4.466 million, which included a $1.058 million signing bonus. At least $2.581 million of Orchard's contract is guaranteed. On October 1, 2016, Orchard was placed on injured reserve.

On September 1, 2018, Orchard was released by the Browns.

=== Buffalo Bills ===
On September 10, 2018, he was signed by the Buffalo Bills. He was released by the Bills on October 2, 2018.

=== Kansas City Chiefs ===
On October 10, 2018, Orchard was signed by the Kansas City Chiefs. He was released on November 6, 2018.

=== Seattle Seahawks ===
On April 4, 2019, Orchard was signed by the Seattle Seahawks. He was released on May 10, 2019.

=== Miami Dolphins ===
On May 15, 2019, Orchard was signed by the Miami Dolphins. He was released on September 3, 2019.

=== Washington Redskins / Football Team (first stint) ===
On November 27, 2019, Orchard was signed by the Washington Redskins. In Week 13 against the Carolina Panthers, Orchard sacked quarterback Kyle Allen once and recovered a fumble forced on Allen by teammate Chris Odom late in the fourth quarter to seal a 29–21 win.

Orchard re-signed with the team on March 25, 2020. He was released on September 5, 2020, and was signed to the practice squad the next day. He was promoted to the active roster on September 29, 2020. He was waived on November 7, 2020.

=== Houston Texans ===
Orchard was claimed off waivers by the Houston Texans on November 9, 2020. He was waived on December 12, 2020.

=== Tennessee Titans ===
Orchard was signed by the Tennessee Titans to their practice squad on December 19, 2020. He was signed to a futures contract on January 11, 2021. On May 10, 2021, Orchard was released by Tennessee.

=== Minnesota Vikings ===
On November 4, 2021, Orchard was signed to the Minnesota Vikings practice squad. He was released on November 19.

=== Green Bay Packers ===
On November 25, 2021, Orchard was signed to the Green Bay Packers practice squad.

=== Washington Football Team (second stint) ===
The Washington Football Team signed Orchard off the Packers' practice squad on December 14, 2021.

== Personal life ==
Orchard legally changed his name from Napa'a Lilo Fakahafua to Nathaniel Fakahafua Orchard in honor of his adopted family. He is married to Maegan Webber Orchard and has a daughter named Katherine Mae Orchard (named after his mother Katherine), a daughter named Charlotte Orchard and a son, Bo Webber Orchard.
