= Norm Thompson (American football) =

American football player (born 1945)

- Thompson in 1976

No. 43
- Position: Cornerback

Personal information
- Born: March 5, 1945 (age 81); San Francisco, California, U.S.
- Listed height: 6 ft 1 in (1.85 m)
- Listed weight: 180 lb (82 kg)

Career information
- High school: Galileo (San Francisco)
- College: Utah
- NFL draft: 1971: 1st round, 17th overall pick

Career history
- St. Louis Cardinals (1971–1976); Baltimore Colts (1977–1979)

Awards and highlights
- Second-team All-American (1970)

Career NFL statistics
- Games played: 115
- Starts: 91
- Interceptions: 33
- Fumble recoveries: 8
- Total TDs: 4
- Stats at Pro Football Reference

Norman Jack Thompson (born March 5, 1945) is an American former professional football player who was a cornerback in the National Football League (NFL) for the St. Louis Cardinals and the Baltimore Colts.

== Biography ==
=== Early life ===
Norm Thompson was born March 5, 1945, in San Francisco, California. He attended Galileo High School in that city.

=== College career ===
After high school graduation he first attended Laney Junior College in Oakland. He transferred to the Utah Utes football in 1969, where he turned in a historic season, intercepting five balls and running three of them back for touchdowns, including a 97-yarder against the University of Wyoming. Thompson's three interceptions returned for touchdown tied an NCAA record dating back to 1939, when Missouri defensive halfback Bud Schwenk managed the feat.

Thompson earned All-Western Athletic Conference honors in both of his years at Utah and became the first defensive player from the school to be selected in the first round of the 1971 NFL draft, when he was picked 17th overall by the St. Louis Cardinals. Thompson was the fourth defensive player selected in 1971 and just the second defensive back.

=== Professional career ===
He began his career as a right cornerback for the Cardinals, starting 5 times and seeing action in all 14 games during his 1971 rookie campaign. He also returned punts and kickoffs, adding to his utility to the team. A regular at right corner in 1972, Thompson twice found himself in the end zone for St. Louis — once with a scoop-and-score fumble recovery and again picking up a blocked punt and taking it 8 yards to the house.

After picking off 4 passes as a rookie, Thompson was relatively quiet for two seasons, intercepting just one ball in 1972 and none in 1973. Moved to the left side of the defensive backfield in 1974, he went on to have his two most productive years, intercepting 6 and 7 balls, respectively, scoring another touchdown for St. Louis in both seasons.

Unhappy with his financial situation, Thompson played out his option with the Cardinals in 1976 and became a free agent. He signed with the Baltimore Colts on April 1 for 1977, with the Colts forced by the commissioner to forfeit a third round draft choice in the forthcoming 1977 NFL draft under the so-called "Rozelle rule". The 1977 contract between the 32-year old Thompson and the Colts called for a salary of $64,900 — $100 less than the threshold for a compensatory second round draft pick — and included a "no trade" clause that the Cardinals were unwilling to match.

The Colts were spurred to go to the free agent market for Thompson due to uncertainty over the loss of defensive back Nelson Munsey, who underwent off-season knee surgery after missing the last four games of the 1976 season. The addition of Thompson allowed the team to move starting left corner Lloyd Mumphord to right corner, his more effective side of the field, according to head coach Ted Marchibroda.

Thompson started all 14 games for the Colts in 1977, recording 3 interceptions, and played in 13 games in 1978, when he added 6 more picks. He fell into a reserve role in 1979, his last year in the league, starting just 4 times and seeing action in 12 games.

Thompson was an older player when he came into the league, already 26 years old, but he still managed to play nine seasons, retiring at age 34. Upon retirement in 1979, Thompson was credited with 33 career interceptions.
