= Utah Utes football =

University of Utah football team

2026 Utah Utes football team
- First season: 1892; 134 years ago
- Athletic director: Mark Harlan
- General manager: Joe D'Orazio
- Head coach: Morgan Scalley; 1st season, 11–0 (1.000)
- Location: Salt Lake City, Utah
- Stadium: Rice–Eccles Stadium (capacity: 54,383)
- NCAA division: Division I FBS
- Conference: Big 12
- Colors: Red and white
- All-time record: 736–491–31 (.597)
- Bowl record: 18–9 (.667)

National championships
- Unclaimed: 2008

Conference championships
- RMAC: 1912, 1922, 1926, 1928, 1929, 1930, 1931, 1932, 1933 Skyline: 1938, 1940, 1941, 1942, 1947, 1948, 1951, 1952, 1953, 1957 WAC: 1964, 1995 MWC: 1999, 2003, 2004, 2008 Pac-12: 2021, 2022

Division championships
- Pac-12 South: 2015, 2018, 2019, 2021
- Consensus All-Americans: 13 (4 unanimous)
- Rivalries: BYU (Holy War); Colorado (rivalry); Utah State (rivalry) Beehive Boot; Arizona State

Uniforms
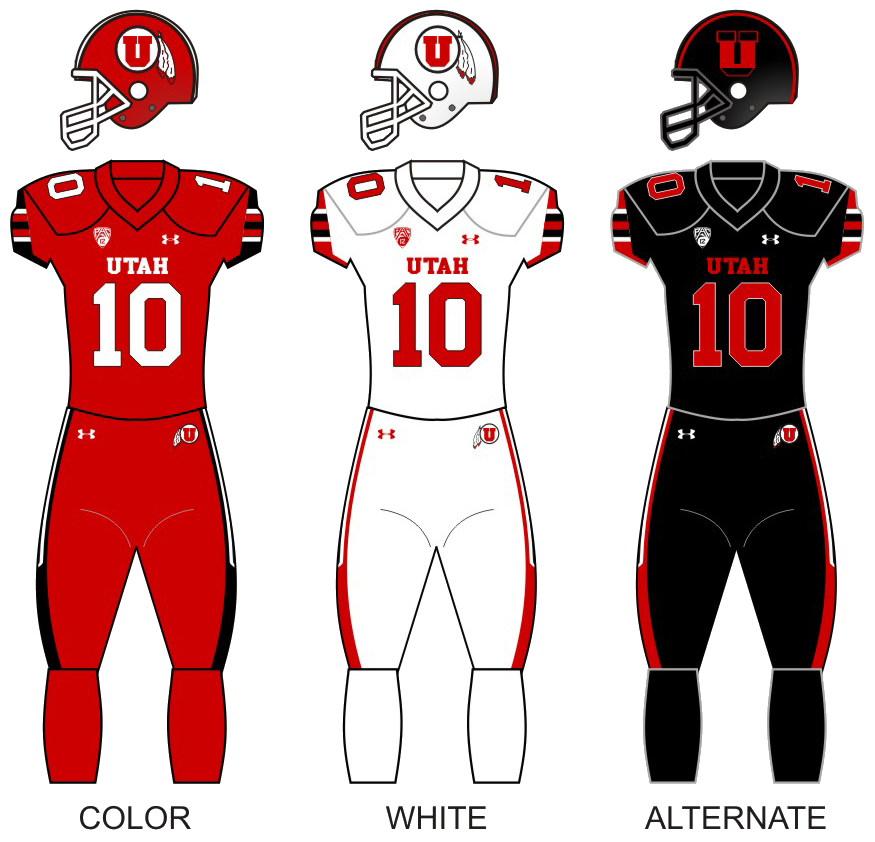
- Fight song: Utah Man
- Mascot: Swoop (red-tailed hawk)
- Marching band: Pride of Utah
- Outfitter: Under Armour
- Website: UtahUtes.com

The Utah Utes football program is a college football team that competes in the Big 12 Conference of the Football Bowl Subdivision (FBS) of NCAA Division I and represents the University of Utah. The Utah college football program began in 1892 and has played home games at the current site of Rice-Eccles Stadium in Salt Lake City since 1927. They have won 27 conference championships in five conferences during their history. As of the end of the 2025 season, they have a cumulative record of 735 wins, 491 losses, and 31 ties (.597).

The Utes have a record of 18–9 (.667) in major bowl games. Among Utah's bowl appearances are two games from the Bowl Championship Series (BCS): the Fiesta Bowl in 2005 and the Sugar Bowl in 2009. In the 2005 Fiesta Bowl, Utah, led by coach Urban Meyer, defeated the Pittsburgh Panthers 35–7, and in the 2009 Sugar Bowl, headed by coach Kyle Whittingham, they defeated coach Nick Saban and the Alabama Crimson Tide 31–17. During those seasons, Utah was a member of the Mountain West Conference, whose champion does not receive an automatic invitation to a BCS bowl. The Utes were the first team from a conference without an automatic bid to play in a BCS bowl game—colloquially known as being a BCS Buster—and the first BCS Buster to play in a second BCS Bowl.

So far in the College Football Playoff era (2014–present) the Utes have made 2 appearances in a New Year's Six game after receiving automatic bids to the 2022 and 2023 Rose Bowl Game by winning the Pac-12 Conference Championship Game.

== History ==
=== Early history (1892–1924) ===
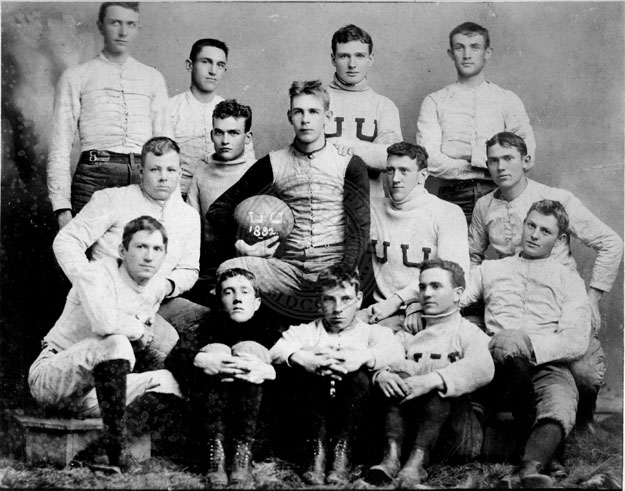
1892 football squad, the first team fielded by the university

During Utah's first year in 1892, the Utes won one game and lost two, including a loss to future rival Utah State. The first two games were against the local YMCA, but it is unclear when they took place. Utah's first game against another college, Utah Agricultural College (now called "Utah State"), was scheduled for Thanksgiving Day, but was postponed one day due to a snowstorm. Utah A.C. won 12–0. Utah did not field a team in 1893, but resumed playing in 1894. One other season in Utah's history has been canceled: in 1918 Utah did not field a football team due to World War I. Utah had its first sustained success when, in 1904, it hired Joe Maddock to coach football, as well as basketball and track. During his six seasons, he coached the football team to a record of 28–9–1 (.750). The school enthusiastically embraced the former Michigan Wolverine.

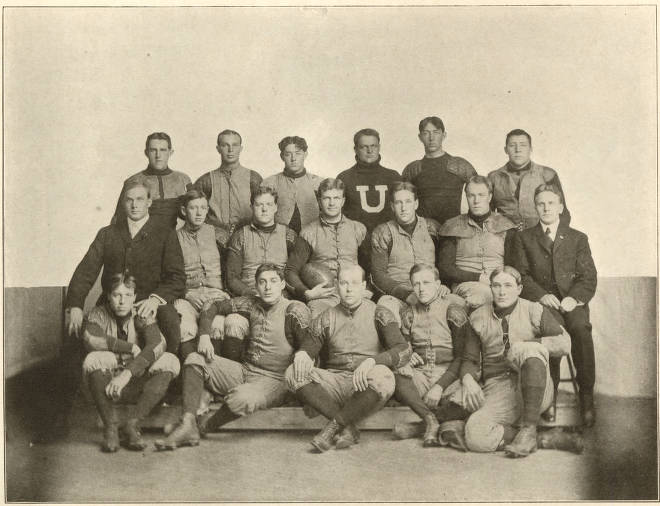
The 1905 football team

In 1905, the Galveston Daily News reported, "He has the Mormons all football crazy. He has written here to say that his team now holds the championship of Utah, Montana, Wyoming, and the greater part of Colorado. When he won the hard-fought battle with Colorado College a week ago the Salt Lake City papers said: 'Maddock' is a new way of saying success. The great Michigan tackle has taken boys who never saw a football before and made them the star players of the Rocky Mountain States." In early 1910, Maddock retired from coaching (although he later coached a year at Oregon.) Fred Bennion coached the Utes from 1910 to 1913. 1910 was also Utah's first season as a member of a conference, the Rocky Mountain Athletic Conference. During his four seasons, Bennion finished with a record of 16–8–3 (.648). Nelson Norgren finished with a record of 13–11 (.542) during his coaching years from 1913 to 1917. Utah did not field a team for the 1918 season because of a shortage of players due to World War I. When play resumed in 1919, Thomas Fitzpatrick started his football coaching career. He continued as the football coach until the end of the 1924 season. His teams finished with a record of 23–17–3 (.570). Utah won their first conference championships in these early years, in 1922.

=== Ike Armstrong era (1925–1949) ===
Future College Football Hall of Fame coach Ike Armstrong was originally hired to coach both the men's basketball team and the football team. While he lasted only two years as basketball coach, in football he amassed a record of 141–55–15 (.704) during his 25 years as head coach, which places him second among Utah head coaches for total wins. Under Armstrong, Utah won 13 conference championships, including 6 in a row from 1928 to 1933 in the Rocky Mountain Athletic Conference. He coached 5 undefeated teams: 3 undefeated and untied seasons (1926, 1929, and 1930) and 2 more seasons where Utah was undefeated but tied (1928 and 1941). The 1930 team only allowed 20 points by the opposition all year (2.5 points per game), but scored 340 points (42.5 points per game.) On offense, they averaged 463 yards a game that year, but were unable to find a postseason opponent. Armstrong coached the Utes to their first bowl in the 1939 Sun Bowl defeating New Mexico 26–0. The MSC was popularly called the "Big Seven Conference", and then after Colorado left following the 1947 season, popularly called the "Skyline Conference" or "Skyline Six". Utah played in and won its first bowl game, the 1939 Sun Bowl, during Armstrong's tenure in the MSC. Armstrong also helped keep the team in existence during World War II even though most of the other schools in the conference decided not to field teams from 1943 to 1945. Armstrong also oversaw the opening of Ute Stadium. As the popularity of Utah football grew, Cumming's Field, an 11,000 capacity stadium that was just south of Presidents Circle on campus, no longer met Utah's needs. The stadium was part of a larger trend of universities building larger stadiums during the 1920s. Ute Stadium initially had a 20,000 seat capacity and a cost of $125,000. After the 1949 season, Armstrong accepted a job at University of Minnesota as their athletic director. In 1957, Armstrong was inducted into the College Football Hall of Fame.

=== Jack Curtice era (1950–1957) ===
We operate on the theory of always threatening a pass with the possibility of a run. Most split-T teams threaten to run with the possibility of a pass. Football that way's not much fun.

— Cactus Jack Curtice on his offensive philosophy

Under "Cactus" Jack Curtice, head coach from 1950 to 1957, Utah enjoyed moderate success. During his eight seasons as Utah head coach, the Utes compiled a record of 45–32–4 (.580) and won four conference championships in the Skyline Conference. In contrast to his predecessor Ike Armstrong, Curtice focused his attention on offense and continually tinkered with his split-T offense. His teams are perhaps best known for popularizing the Utah Pass, which is an overhand forward shovel pass of the ball. The play is commonly used today by teams which use a spread offense. Quarterback Lee Grosscup caught the attention of the east coast press when he and the Utes had a close 33–39 loss to top ten program Army at West Point, New York. Grosscup threw for 316 yards against a tough Army defense in an era where most teams seldom passed the ball. Despite losing, Curtice referred to the game as "The time we beat Army."

=== Ray Nagel era (1958–1965) ===
After Curtice left to coach Stanford, Ray Nagel took the helm. He coached for eight seasons from 1958 to 1965 before leaving for Iowa. During his tenure, the Utes had a record of 42–39–1 (.518) and were co-conference champions of the Western Athletic Conference in 1964. As a reward, the Utes garnered an invitation to Atlantic City to play in the 1964 Liberty Bowl, which was the first major college football game held indoors. Utah dominated the game against West Virginia from start to finish and won by the score of 32–6. Utah finished the season ranked No. 14 in the Coaches' Poll.

=== Mike Giddings era (1966–1967) ===
Nagel's replacement, Mike Giddings, posted a record of 9–12 (.429) during the 1966 and 1967 seasons before resigning. Giddings had previously been an assistant coach at USC under head coach John McKay and brought with him hopes that the Utes football program would be turned around, but an inability to get recruiting going led to on-field issues that essentially prevented any chance of viable football success.

=== Bill Meek era (1968–1973) ===
Bill Meek, coach from 1968 to 1973, failed to substantially improve the Utes, and they went 33–31 (.516) over his six seasons before he was fired. The Utes' best season under Meek was an 8–2 campaign in 1969. Meek, like his predecessor, Giddings, failed to get any sort of recruiting momentum which resulted in subpar and mediocre team performances year in and year out.

=== Tom Lovat era (1974–1976) ===
Last night I sat down and tried to think about all the highlights from last year and I fell asleep.

— Former coach Tom Lovat after the Utes went 1–10 in his first year.

Utah replaced Meek with Tom Lovat, who has the lowest winning percentage among coaches of the Utah football program (with the exception of Walter Shoup who only coached one game in 1895.) During his tenure from 1974 to 1976, his teams posted a 5–28 record (.152), and had a 0–6 record against in-state rivals Utah State and Brigham Young (BYU). These years coincided with the emergence of BYU football under the tutelage of LaVell Edwards.

=== Wayne Howard era (1977–1981) ===
Next in line was Wayne Howard, who coached from 1977 to 1981. He performed substantially better than his predecessor and his Ute teams posted a record of 30–24–2 (.554). Despite a record of 8–2–1 in his final season and being in contention for the Western Athletic Conference Championship, Howard resigned at the end of the season. He cited several reasons for leaving, but he particularly disliked the BYU–Utah rivalry.

=== Chuck Stobart era (1982–1984) ===
The Utes lost whatever progress they made under Howard during the Chuck Stobart years, 1982–1984. During his tenure, the Utes compiled a 16–17–1 record (.485), and saw hated rival BYU earn a National Championship. Though the Stobart era wasn't the worst period in Utes football history, it was marked by the continued mediocrity that had plagued the program in recent years. Stobart's 1982 and 1983 teams posted 5–6 records with only decent offenses and average defenses to show for it. The 1984 Utes improved slightly to a 6–5–1 record, but fans and administration were impatient, prompting Stobart's resignation.

=== Jim Fassel era (1985–1989) ===
The program regressed further during the Jim Fassel era from 1985 to 1989, with a 25–33 record (.431). His teams were marked by high scoring offenses and abysmal defenses. In 1989, his final season, the Utes scored 30.42 points per game, but allowed 43.67 points per game. The lone bright spot of his tenure was a 57–28 upset of nationally ranked BYU to end the 1988 season, which was dubbed by Ute fans as The Rice Bowl.

=== Ron McBride era (1990–2002) ===
The thing what I'm trying to do is to bring a different approach to Utah football. It will be one where we're going to build a defense first, and it's going to be more of a smash-mouth type organization.

— Ron McBride after being hired as head coach

Utah appointed Arizona offensive line coach Ron McBride as their head coach on December 21, 1989. McBride had been an assistant coach for 26 years total and was an assistant at Utah from 1977 to 1982 and later 1985 to 1986. Coach McBride inherited a program that had only had five winning seasons in the previous 16 years, and had not posted a winning season in WAC play since 1985. Later, he said that expectations had dropped so low that Ute fans were content to not be embarrassed–particularly against BYU–and finish in the middle of the WAC.

He didn't take long to turn the program around. In 1991, his second season, he posted a 7–5 record, but a blowout loss to rival BYU kept them out of a bowl. A year later, he led the Utes to the 1992 Copper Bowl, the program's first bowl appearance in 28 years. He took the Utes to six bowl games during his tenure, a noteworthy feat considering the Utes had played in just three bowl games in their entire history prior to his arrival. His teams posted bowl wins over USC, Arizona and Fresno State. During his tenure at Utah, McBride posted an overall record of 88–63 (.582), at the time the second-most wins by a coach in the history of Utah football. The Utes reached their peak under McBride when they finished the 1994 season ranked No. 10 in the AP Poll and No. 8 in the Coaches' Poll and recorded a 16–13 victory over Arizona in the Freedom Bowl. That season, the Utes beat four teams who ended the season ranked: Oregon, Colorado State, BYU, and Arizona. In 1995, Utah won a share of its first conference title in 31 years, when it finished in a four-way tie for the WAC title. In 1999, Utah was again co-conference champion, this time finishing in a three-way tie for the first Mountain West Conference title.

McBride's tenure at Utah began to falter in 2000. The Utes were the favorites to win the Mountain West after tying for the conference title a year earlier, but lost their first four games en route to a 4–7 record, their first losing record since McBride's arrival. Season-ticket sales fell 15% as a result, problematic given the costly rebuilding of Rice-Eccles Stadium, and pressure rose to fire McBride. The Utes rebounded in 2001, achieving a winning record and scoring an upset win in the 2001 Las Vegas Bowl over the USC Trojans in Pete Carroll's first season. With the Utes slipping again into a losing season, McBride was fired by Utah after the 2002 season and replaced by Urban Meyer. Despite the inglorious end to McBride's tenure, he is credited with laying the foundation for Utah's rise to national prominence, which came under his successors.

=== Urban Meyer era (2003–2004) ===
On December 12, 2002, Bowling Green head coach Urban Meyer was named Utah's head coach. In his inaugural season, the Utes showed a knack for winning close games. Meyer implemented a spread offense attack and with quarterback Alex Smith led Utah to a 10–2 record, an outright MWC championship (their first outright conference title in 46 years), and a 17–0 victory in the Liberty Bowl over Southern Miss. They finished the season ranked No. 21 in both major polls. He also earned honors as The Sporting News National Coach of the Year, the first Utes' coach to do so.

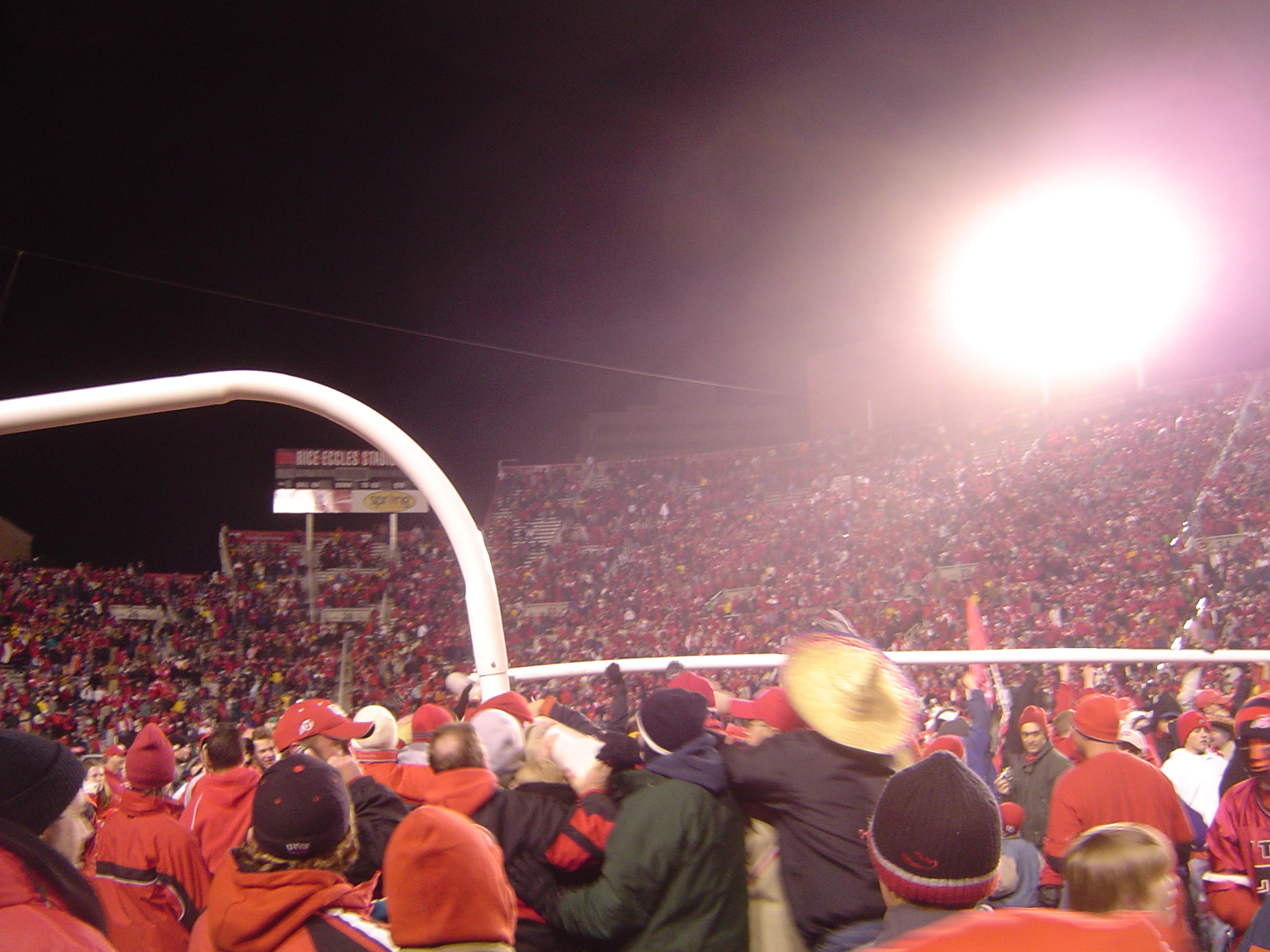
Utah fans carry the goalpost after the Utes completed a perfect regular season.

In his second season as head coach, the Utes repeated as conference champions. They were a high scoring team; they scored 544 total points on the season, which is a team record, and averaged 45.33 points per game. They played key out-of-conference games against Texas A&M, Arizona, and North Carolina, and they won every game by at least two touchdowns (14 points). After completing their first undefeated season in over 70 years, Utah became the first team from a non-automatically qualifying BCS conference to play in a BCS bowl. The Utes played Big East Conference champion Pittsburgh in the 2005 Fiesta Bowl, winning 35–7. The Utes finished the season ranked No. 4 in the AP poll. Later that year, Alex Smith, who during the 2003 and 2004 seasons compiled a 21–1 record as a starting quarterback, was drafted No. 1 by the San Francisco 49ers in the 2005 NFL draft. He became the first player from a college in the state of Utah to ever be drafted first. After two years with Utah, Urban Meyer left after the 2005 Fiesta Bowl to coach Florida. His record at Utah was 22–2 (.917), which is the highest winning percentage among Utah head coaches.

=== Kyle Whittingham era (2005–2025) ===
Kyle Whittingham was promoted from defensive coordinator following Utah's undefeated 2004 regular season. Whittingham served as the co-head coach in the 2005 Fiesta Bowl, helping Utah to defeat Pittsburgh.

During Whittingham's first twelve years as head coach, the Utes recorded a 104–50 (.675) overall record and 60–42 (.588) in conference play, and won 10 of their 11 bowl games: the 2005 Emerald Bowl, the 2006 Armed Forces Bowl, the 2007 Poinsettia Bowl, the 2009 Sugar Bowl, the 2009 Poinsettia Bowl, the 2011 Sun Bowl, the 2014 Las Vegas Bowl, the 2015 Las Vegas Bowl, and the 2016 Foster Farms Bowl. Utah lost the 2010 Las Vegas Bowl. Prior to his tenure as head coach, Whittingham worked for 11 years as an assistant coach at Utah; the final ten years were as the defensive coordinator. Thus far, in his 23 years with the program, Utah has compiled a 189–91 record (.675), played in 16 bowl games (winning 14), captured five conference titles, won one Pac-12 South Division co-championship, and finished in the top ten three times.

==== 2008 undefeated season ====
In 2008, Utah posted a 12–0 record on their way to winning the MWC Championship. During the regular season, the Utes beat Michigan on the road and Oregon State, TCU, and BYU at home. Their undefeated 2008 regular season resulted in an invitation to the 2009 Sugar Bowl, which made them the first repeat BCS Buster; Utah won the Sugar Bowl and rolled past heavily favored Alabama by a score of 31–17 to stay undefeated on the season. Four of the teams Utah beat ended the season in the Coaches' and AP Polls: Oregon State, TCU, BYU, and Alabama. Both TCU and Alabama ended in the top ten. In the final Coaches' Poll and AP Poll, Utah finished at No. 4 and No. 2, respectively, for their highest ranking in each poll ever. They were declared the national champions by the Anderson/Hester Poll, an NCAA recognized selector, but do not claim this title. Later in 2017, the 2008 Utah team tied for first in a ranking of the top 10 Group of Five teams in the last 10 years.

==== Pac-12 Entry ====
On June 17, 2010, Utah agreed to join the then Pac-10. The Utes officially became the 12th member of the Conference on July 1, 2011. Joining along with Colorado, these teams were the first additions to the league since 1978. Utah was described as a Plan B option for the conference, joining to keep things even after plans to add Texas and Oklahoma fell through. Utah's recent success was credited for their invitation to the conference with Pac-12 commissioner Larry Scott saying “We’re well aware of the 2–0 record in BCS bowl games.” The team struggled with the conference change at first, reaching a low point after 2014 having had back to back losing seasons. Misfortune also played a factor in their struggle having lost starting quarterbacks to injury in both seasons. The following year, Utah's 62–20 win over Oregon in 2015 signified the Utes ascent to the top of the Pac-12. That blow-out win was credited with changing the outlook in college football.

Utah won their first Pac-12 South Division title in 2018 and the next summer they were predicted to win the conference championship. In 2021, Utah posted an 8–1 record in conference play to win the South division before crushing Oregon by a 38–10 final in the conference title game, though they would narrowly lose their first Rose Bowl appearance in a high-scoring bout with Ohio State. In 2022, Utah defeated USC in the conference title game 47–24 to win back-to-back championships. Utah had taken full advantage of their Pac-12 opportunity, going from scrappy Mountain West Conference over-achiever to back-to-back Rose Bowl berths.

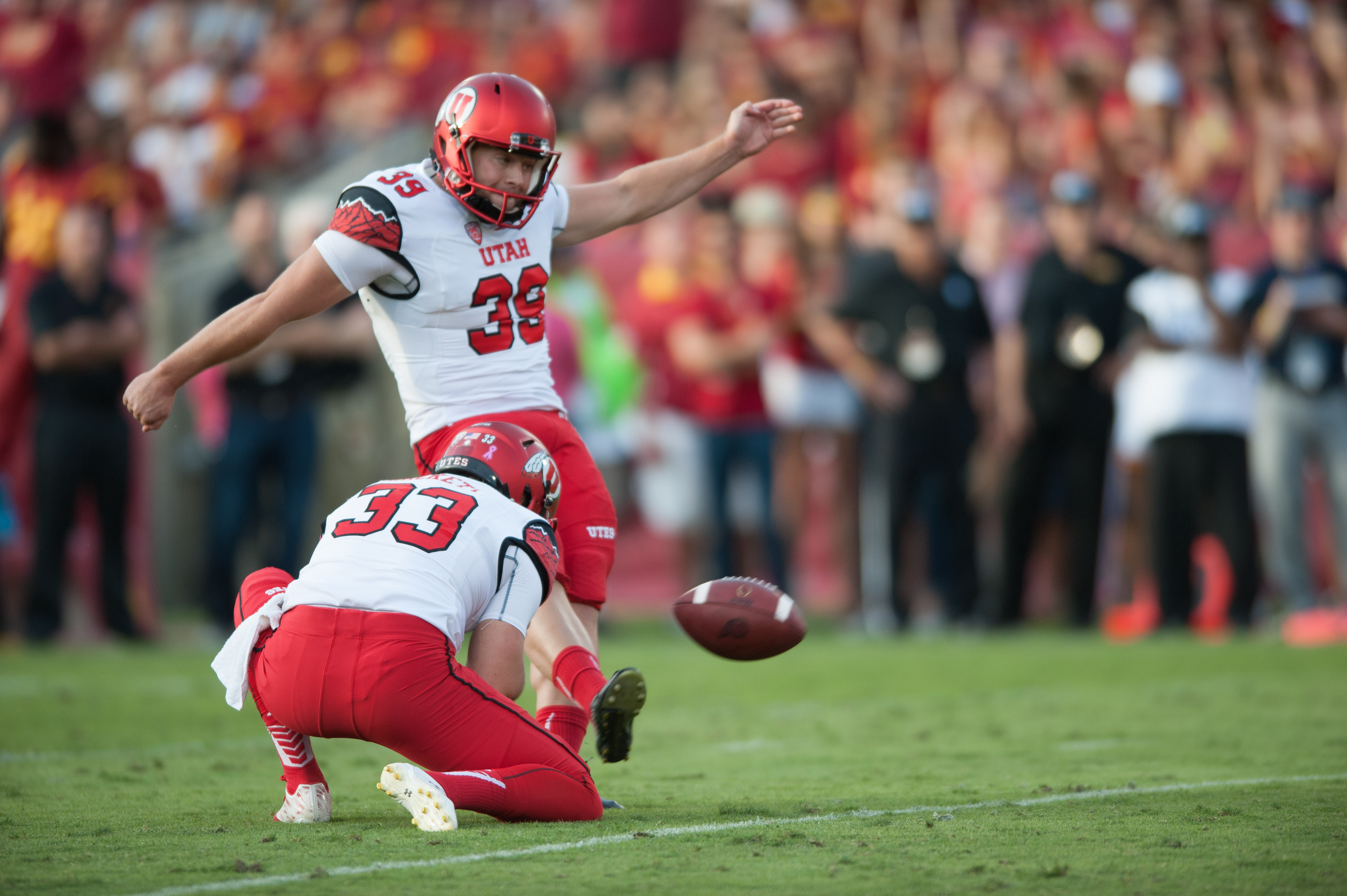
Andy Phillips kicks a field goal during a 2015 game at Los Angeles Memorial Coliseum

==== Big 12 ====
In response to recent conference realignment, Utah Athletics announced on August 4, 2023, that they would be joining the Big 12 Conference starting the 2024–25 academic year, along with Arizona, Arizona State, and Colorado. Utah's move to the Big 12 reunited them and bitter rival BYU in the same conference after 14 seasons of inconsistent play.

On December 12, 2025, Kyle Whittingham announced that he would step down as head coach after coaching in the team's bowl game. At that time he was the second-longest tenured head coach in college football at 21 years. As head coach, Whittingham led the program to a win-loss record of 177–88 (.668), an undefeated, 13–0 2008 season including a Sugar Bowl win over Alabama, 3 conference championships, and 2 Rose Bowl Game appearances.

=== Morgan Scalley era (2025–present) ===
Morgan Scalley started off his career with a win in the Las Vegas Bowl over Nebraska, 44–22. After being designated as head-coach-in-waiting, Morgan Scalley officially became head coach following the departure of Kyle Whittingham on December 12, 2025. Prior to being promoted, Coach Scalley was a coach under Kyle Whittingham for 18 years, including 10 years as his defensive coordinator. Prior to coaching, Scalley played defensive back for Utah on the undefeated 2004 team that was first to bust the BCS. As a senior he won Mountain West Defensive Player of the Year and was a second-team All-American.

== Conference affiliations ==
Big 12 logo in Utah colors

Utah has been a member of the following conferences.

- Independent (1892–1909)
- Rocky Mountain Athletic Conference (1910–1937)
- Mountain States Athletic Conference (1938–1961)
  - Big Seven Conference (1938–1946)
  - Skyline Six Conference (1947–1950)
  - Skyline Eight Conference (1951–1961)
- Western Athletic Conference (1962–1998)
- Mountain West Conference (1999–2010)
- Pac-12 Conference (2011–2023)
- Big 12 Conference (2024–present)

== Championships ==
=== Unclaimed national championship ===
In 2008 the Utes were the nation's only undefeated team. They were selected as national champions. The school does not claim this title.

Year	Coach	Selectors	Record	Bowl	Opponent	Result	Final AP	Final Coaches'
2008	Kyle Whittingham	Anderson & Hester, Wolfe	13–0	Sugar Bowl	Alabama	W 31–17	No. 2	No. 4

=== Conference championships ===
Utah has won 27 conference championships in seven different conferences under 8 head coaches during their history. 21 of those conference championships have been outright and for the remaining 6 Utah has been co-champion.

Year	Conference	Coach	Overall record	Conference record
1912†	Rocky Mountain Athletic Conference	Fred Bennion	5–1–1	4–1
1922	Rocky Mountain Athletic Conference	Thomas Fitzpatrick	7–1	5–0
1926	Rocky Mountain Athletic Conference	Ike Armstrong	7–0	5–0
1928	Rocky Mountain Athletic Conference	Ike Armstrong	5–0–2	4–0–1
1929	Rocky Mountain Athletic Conference	Ike Armstrong	7–0	6–0
1930	Rocky Mountain Athletic Conference	Ike Armstrong	8–0	7–0
1931	Rocky Mountain Athletic Conference	Ike Armstrong	7–2	6–0
1932	Rocky Mountain Athletic Conference	Ike Armstrong	6–1–1	6–0
1933†	Rocky Mountain Athletic Conference	Ike Armstrong	5–3	5–1
1938	Big Seven Conference	Ike Armstrong	7–1–2	4–0–2
1940	Big Seven Conference	Ike Armstrong	7–2	5–1
1941	Big Seven Conference	Ike Armstrong	6–0–2	4–0–2
1942†	Big Seven Conference	Ike Armstrong	6–3	5–1
1947	Skyline Six Conference	Ike Armstrong	8–1–1	6–0
1948	Skyline Six Conference	Ike Armstrong	8–1–1	5–0
1951	Skyline Six Conference	Jack Curtice	7–4	4–1
1952	Skyline Eight Conference	Jack Curtice	6–3–1	5–0
1953	Skyline Eight Conference	Jack Curtice	8–2	5–0
1957	Skyline Eight Conference	Jack Curtice	6–4	5–1
1964†	Western Athletic Conference	Ray Nagel	9–2	3–1
1995†	Western Athletic Conference	Ron McBride	7–4	6–2
1999†	Mountain West Conference	Ron McBride	9–3	5–2
2003	Mountain West Conference	Urban Meyer	10–2	6–1
2004	Mountain West Conference	Urban Meyer	12–0	7–0
2008	Mountain West Conference	Kyle Whittingham	13–0	8–0
2021	Pac-12 Conference	Kyle Whittingham	10–4	8–1
2022	Pac-12 Conference	Kyle Whittingham	10–4	7–2

† Indicates Co-champions

=== Division championships ===
Utah has won 5 division championships, all in the South division of the Pac-12 Conference.

Year	Division	Coach	CG Opponent	CG result
2015†	Pac-12 South	Kyle Whittingham	N/A lost tiebreaker to USC	
2018	Pac-12 South	Kyle Whittingham	Washington	L 3–10
2019	Pac-12 South	Kyle Whittingham	Oregon	L 15–37
2021	Pac-12 South	Kyle Whittingham	Oregon	W 38–10
2022	Pac-12 South	Kyle Whittingham	USC	W 47–24

† Co-championship

== Undefeated seasons ==
Year	Overall Record	Conference Record	Head Coach
1926	7–0	5–0	Ike Armstrong
1929	7–0	6–0	Ike Armstrong
1930	8–0	7–0	Ike Armstrong
2004	12–0	7–0	Urban Meyer
2008	13–0	8–0	Kyle Whittingham

== Bowl games ==
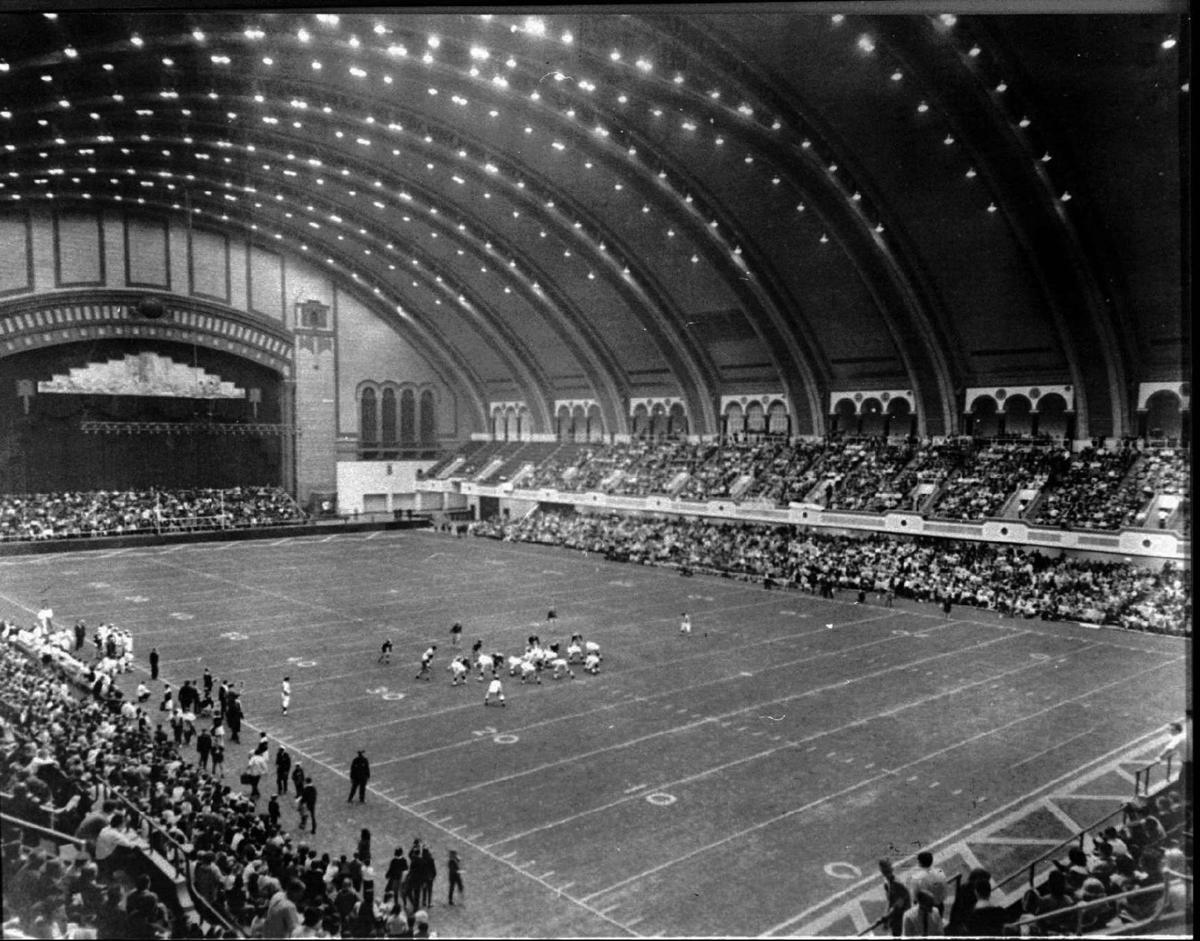
Liberty Bowl at the Atlantic City Convention Center in 1964

The Utah Utes have played in 27 NCAA sanctioned major bowl games with a record of 18–9 (.667) through the 2025 season. The Utes are tied for third with UCLA for most consecutive seasons with postseason victories having won 7 straight bowl games from 2003 to 2009. Utah tied Southern California for second place in most consecutive postseason victories by winning 9 straight bowl games from 1999 to 2009 (The 2000 and 2002 teams were not bowl eligible). The team also won 5 consecutive bowl games from 2011 to 2017 but did not participate in bowl games in 2012 and 2013. In 1964 Utah won the first major bowl game played indoors beating West Virginia in the Liberty Bowl.

Date	Bowl	Coach	Opponent	Result	AP	Coaches
Jan. 2, 1939	Sun Bowl	Ike Armstrong	New Mexico	W 26–0		
Dec. 19, 1964	Liberty Bowl	Ray Nagel	West Virginia	W 32–6		14
Dec. 29, 1992	Copper Bowl	Ron McBride	Washington State	L 28–31		
Dec. 30, 1993	Freedom Bowl	Ron McBride	Southern California	L 21–28		
Dec. 27, 1994	Freedom Bowl	Ron McBride	Arizona	W 16–13	10	8
Dec. 27, 1996	Copper Bowl	Ron McBride	Wisconsin	L 10–38		
Dec. 18, 1999	Las Vegas Bowl	Ron McBride	Fresno State	W 17–16		
Dec. 25, 2001	Las Vegas Bowl	Ron McBride	Southern California	W 10–6		
Dec. 31, 2003	Liberty Bowl	Urban Meyer	Southern Miss	W 17–0	21	21
Jan. 1, 2005	Fiesta Bowl	Urban Meyer & Kyle Whittingham	Pittsburgh	W 35–7	4	5
Dec. 29, 2005	Emerald Bowl	Kyle Whittingham	Georgia Tech	W 38–10		
Dec. 23, 2006	Armed Forces Bowl	Kyle Whittingham	Tulsa	W 25–13		
Dec. 20, 2007	Poinsettia Bowl	Kyle Whittingham	Navy	W 35–32		
Jan. 2, 2009	Sugar Bowl	Kyle Whittingham	Alabama	W 31–17	2	4
Dec. 23, 2009	Poinsettia Bowl	Kyle Whittingham	California	W 37–27	18	18
Dec. 22, 2010	Las Vegas Bowl	Kyle Whittingham	Boise State	L 3–26		23
Dec. 31, 2011	Sun Bowl	Kyle Whittingham	Georgia Tech	W 30–27 (OT)		
Dec. 20, 2014	Las Vegas Bowl	Kyle Whittingham	Colorado State	W 45–10	21	20
Dec. 19, 2015	Las Vegas Bowl	Kyle Whittingham	BYU	W 35–28	17	16
Dec. 28, 2016	Foster Farms Bowl	Kyle Whittingham	Indiana	W 26–24	23	21
Dec. 26, 2017	Heart of Dallas Bowl	Kyle Whittingham	West Virginia	W 30–14		
Dec. 31, 2018	Holiday Bowl	Kyle Whittingham	Northwestern	L 20–31		
Dec. 27, 2019	Alamo Bowl	Kyle Whittingham	Texas	L 10–38	16	16
Jan. 1, 2022	Rose Bowl†	Kyle Whittingham	Ohio State	L 45–48	12	12
Jan. 1, 2023	Rose Bowl†	Kyle Whittingham	Penn State	L 21–35	10	11
Dec. 23, 2023	Las Vegas Bowl	Kyle Whittingham	Northwestern	L 7–14		
Dec. 31, 2025	Las Vegas Bowl	Morgan Scalley	Nebraska	W 44–22	15	15

† New Year's Six bowl game

Bowl record by game

Bowl	#	W	L	%
Alamo Bowl	1	0	1	.000
Armed Forces Bowl	1	1	0	1.000
Copper Bowl	2	0	2	.000
Fiesta Bowl	1	1	0	1.000
Freedom Bowl	2	1	1	.500
Heart of Dallas Bowl	1	1	0	1.000
Holiday Bowl	1	0	1	.000
Las Vegas Bowl	7	5	2	.714
Liberty Bowl	2	2	0	1.000
Poinsettia Bowl	2	2	0	1.000
Rose Bowl	2	0	2	.000
San Francisco Bowl; Emerald Bowl; Foster Farms Bowl	2	2	0	1.000
Sugar Bowl	1	1	0	1.000
Sun Bowl	2	2	0	1.000
Total	27	18	9	.667

=== Unsanctioned Bowls ===
Utah traveled to Hawaii to play in the 1947 Pineapple Bowl which was not sanctioned by the NCAA as a bowl game at the time and thus only counts as a regular season game in official NCAA statistics. The game was played on January 1, 1947, and Utah lost to Hawaii 16–19.

== Venues ==
=== Ute Stadium (1927–1971) ===
Ute Stadium was built in 1927 and opened with a Utah win over Colorado Mines.

=== Rice Stadium (1972–1997) ===
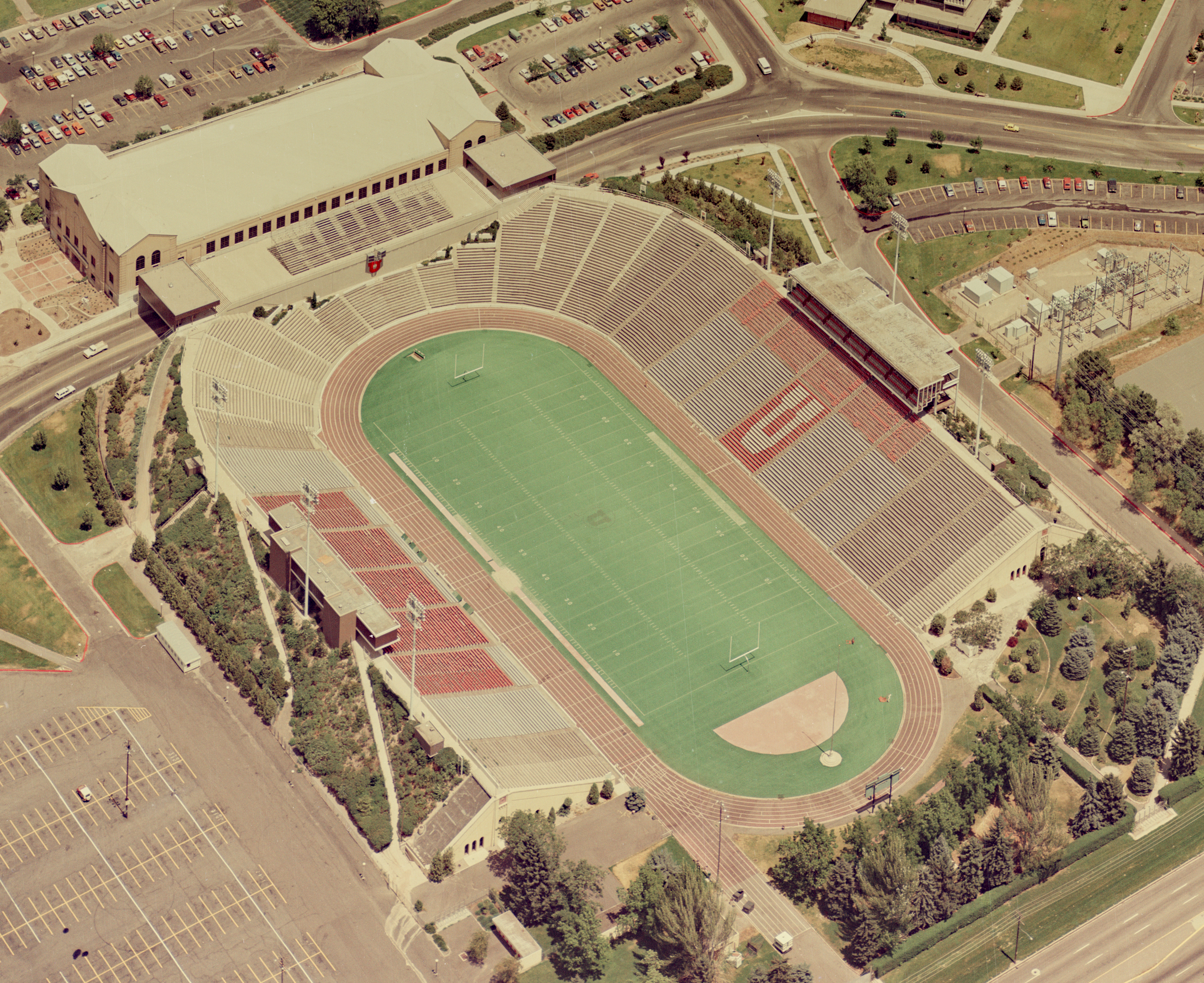
Rice Stadium in July 1978

In 1972, the stadium was rechristened Rice Stadium in honor of Robert L. Rice, who had donated money for a recently completed renovation.

=== Rice–Eccles Stadium (1998–present) ===
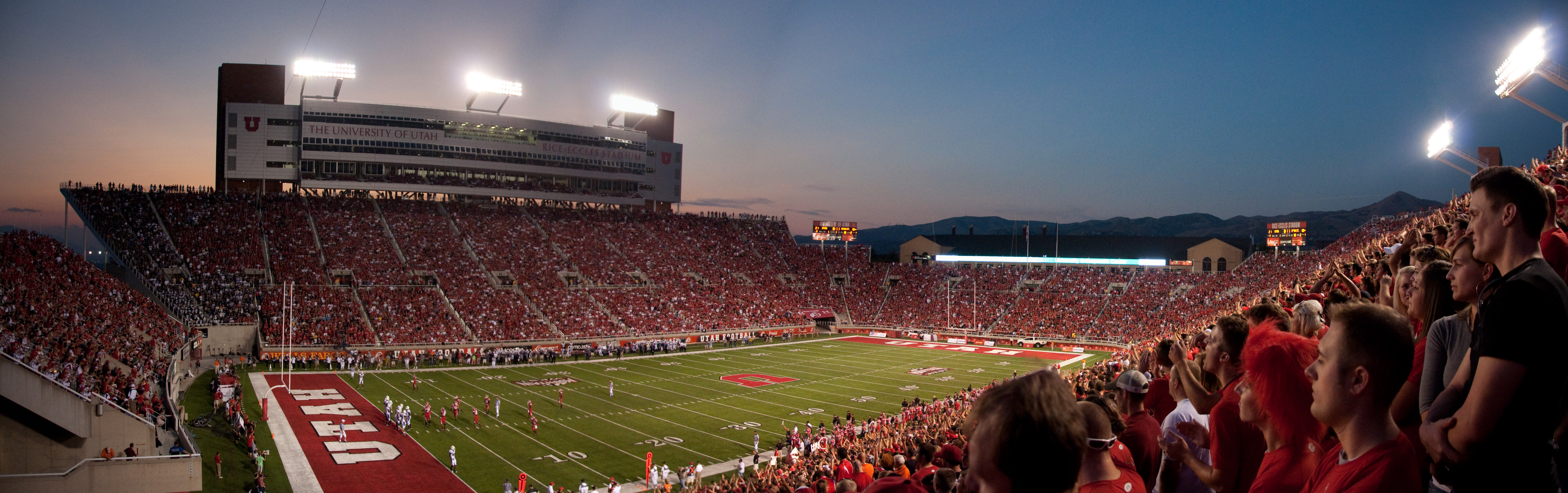
Rice-Eccles Stadium

Utah's home games have been played at Rice-Eccles Stadium since Sept. 12, 1998. Rice-Eccles Stadium occupies the footprint of the previous Ute and Rice stadiums mentioned above. Since the location of the stadium has stayed the same throughout the years, Utah Football fans have been coming to the same location to cheer the Utes on now for 98 years.

On December 20, 1996, University President Arthur Smith announced that The George S. and Dolores Doré Eccles Foundation would be making a major philanthropic gift for the renovation of Rice Stadium. The Foundation agreed to contribute US$5 million immediately followed by an additional $5 million matching contribution for when the university raised $10 million more from the private sector ($4 million had already been raised at the time). In public recognition of the Foundation's donation, which provided substantial financial support, the stadium was renamed to Rice-Eccles Stadium.

The 2002 Olympic Organizing Committee pledged $8 million toward the project.

The estimated US$50 million renovation expanded the stadium capacity to 45,017 while also improving the press box among other upgrades.

When Salt Lake City was awarded the 2002 Winter Olympics in 1995, it was obvious that Rice Stadium was not suitable to serve as the main stadium. However, it had been showing its age for some time before then. It was decided to completely overhaul the stadium and bring it up to modern standards. After the 1997 season, Rice Stadium was almost completely demolished, with the old timber, concrete, and earth-fill facility replaced by a modern steel, concrete, and glass stadium. The south end zone bleachers, built in 1982, were all that remained of the old stadium before the Ken Garff Performance Zone renovation.

==== Ken Garff Red Zone ====
The Ken Garff Performance Zone opened in 2021. The project created a premium experience in the south end zone of the stadium (The only remaining remnants of Rice Stadium). The much-anticipated project enclosed the south end of Rice-Eccles Stadium added unique premium spaces to the venue, and increased capacity to 51,444 was announced in November 2018. In April 2019 the Ken Garff family generously pledged $17.5 million toward the $80 million project that will transform the home of Utah football and provide a world-class student-athlete experience. The Ken Garff family's donation is the largest donation in Utah Athletics history.

== Rivalries ==
=== BYU ===
The Utah-BYU football rivalry was ranked #28 in a 2025 ranking of college football's top rivalries. Today it is considered the signature rivalry in the Rocky Mountains. One critique of the rivalry game is that it has only been a top 25 matchup 3 times. The series went uninterrupted from 1922 until 2013 (except for during World War II). Utah scheduled a home and home series with Michigan in place of the game for 2014 and 2015 interrupting the series. With Utah joining the Big 12 in 2024 the rivalry is once again protected and is expected to continue on a yearly basis.

The nickname “Holy War” is relatively new for the rivalry game which dates back to 1896. Despite its religious overtones, fans and journalists continue to use the name. SI.com has recognized it as the No. 6 best nickname for a rivalry game.

Utah has led the series since 1922. They dominated the early years where in the 50 years from 1922 until 1971 they only lost 5 games. The 2010s were a decade of total dominance for Utah: they won all 9 games played between the two teams.

Utah leads the series 62–37–4 through the 2025 season.

=== Utah State ===
We do consider it a rivalry even though of late it hasn't been very competitive as far as the win–loss. But it is a rivalry nonetheless in our eyes.

— Utah head coach Kyle Whittingham

The Utah-Utah State rivalry did not make a 2025 ranking of the top 100 college football rivalries but it was worth mentioning as one of the best ones left out. The teams met first in 1892 for the first collegiate game in Utah. The game, nicknamed the “Battle of the Brothers”, went uninterrupted from 1919 to 2009. Utah outgrew the series after they joined the Pac-12.

Through the 2026 season, Utah leads the series 81–29–4 and has won 24 of the last 27 games.

=== Colorado ===
The rivalry name alone, "Rumble of the Rockies", has been ranked no. 18 in the top 25 of college football rivalry names. However, the rivalry overall was not ranked in a 2025 top 100 ranking that considered all aspects of the game. This could be because the rivalry has not been competitive recently: Utah has won 12 of the last 15 matchups.

Prior to 1963 when the rivalry was first interrupted, the two teams had played each other 57 times beginning in 1903, with Colorado leading the rivalry 30–24–3. Key games during that period included an upset by Utah in 1962, when Colorado was ranked No. 8 in the nation.

After an almost 50-year gap in the rivalry from 1963 to 2010, the rivalry received a reboot in 2011 when both teams joined the Pac-12. During their time together in the Pac-12, both teams met during rivalry week the majority of years. The two teams have discussed creating a trophy to "speed up" the development of the rivalry. There have been three games since joining the Pac-12 Conference that have had division title implications, mostly due to the fact that the game was played late in the year.

Utah leads the series 36–33–3 through the 2024 season.

=== Beehive Boot ===
The Beehive Boot has been the trophy given to the champion of a three-way in state rivalry between Utah's top football programs: Utah, Utah State, and BYU. For the years it was awarded the trophy represents the mythical championship for college football in Utah. The idea of naming the championship the Beehive Boot was first developed in 1971 by sports information directors at Utah, Utah State, and BYU. All three teams played each other for the first 24 years of the trophy and Utah only won the trophy 4 times. Overall, in years that all teams have met, Utah has won the trophy 9 out of 36 times. Utah's first miss on the rivalry was in 2010 when Utah did not face Utah State. After Utah joined the Pac-12 in 2011, scheduling games against Utah State became more difficult. The last time all three teams played each other within the same season was 2015. That year Utah won the trophy by beating both Utah State in the regular season and BYU in the Las Vegas Bowl. Two years later, in 2017, interest in the trophy reached its low point when the trophy was not awarded despite Utah and Utah State both beating BYU. Since the trophy rules weren't followed and the tiebreaker wasn't voted on by media the trophy was considered retired. Utah is scheduled to play both teams in 2026 and 2031, however not all 3 teams will meet those years.

== All-time series records ==
Big 12 opponents
Opponent	First meeting	Last meeting	Overall	Big 12	Pac-12
Arizona	1924	2026	UTAH 27–21–2	AZ 1–1	UTAH 7–6
Arizona State	1961	2025	AZST 13–23	TIED 1–1	TIED 6–6
Baylor	2023	2025	UTAH 3–0	UTAH 2–0	–
BYU	1896	2026	UTAH 63–37–4	BYU 1–2	–
Cincinnati	2025	2026	UTAH 2–0	UTAH 2–0	–
Colorado	1903	2026	UTAH 37–33–3	UTAH 2–1	UTAH 11–2
Houston	1966	2026	HOU 1–5	TIED 1–1	–
Iowa State	1970	2026	IWST 2–5	TIED 1–1	–
Kansas	1950	2026	UTAH 4–2	UTAH 2–0	–
Kansas State	2025	2025	UTAH 1–0	UTAH 1–0	–
Oklahoma State	1945	2024	TIED 1–1	UTAH 1–0	–
TCU	1996	2024	UTAH 5–4	TCU 0–1	–
Texas Tech	1972	2025	TXTCH 0–3	TXTCH 0–1	–
UCF	2024	2024	UTAH 1–0	UTAH 1–0	–
West Virginia	1964	2025	UTAH 3–0	UTAH 1–0	–

Former Pac-12 opponents
Opponent	First meeting	Last meeting	Overall	Pac-12
California	1920	2023	UTAH 7–6	UTAH 4–2
Oregon	1933	2023	ORE 12–25	ORE 4–7
Oregon State	1931	2023	ORST 12–13–1	UTAH 7–4
Stanford	1902	2022	UTAH 7–4	UTAH 5–1
UCLA	1933	2025	UCLA 10–12	UTAH 8–4
USC	1915	2023	USC 10–13	TIED 7–7
Washington	1931	2023	WASH 2–14	WASH 2–8
Washington State	1966	2022	UTAH 11–9–0	UTAH 6–4

Other opponents
Opponent	First meeting	Last meeting	Overall
Air Force	1957	2010	AF 13–14
Colorado State	1902	2014	UTAH 56–22–2
Fresno State	1980	2015	UTAH 7–4
Hawaii	1926	1998	UTAH 15–12
Idaho	1908	2026	UTAH 15–12–2
Nevada	1901	1945	UTAH 4–5–1
New Mexico	1939	2010	UTAH 33–17–2
San Diego State	1978	2022	UTAH 18–13–1
San Jose State	1969	2017	UTAH 8–1
UNLV	1979	2010	UTAH 14–2
Utah State	1892	2026	UTAH 81–29–4
UTEP	1964	1998	UTAH 25–8
Wyoming	1904	2025	UTAH 52–31–1

== Head coaching history and current staff ==
=== Current coaching staff ===
Utah Utes
Name	Position	Consecutive season(s) at Utah in current position	Previous position
Morgan Scalley	Head coach	1st	Utah – Defensive coordinator / safeties (2016–2025)
Kevin McGiven	Offensive coordinator	1st	Utah State – Offensive coordinater / quarterbacks (2025)
Colton Swan	Defensive coordinator / Linebackers	1st	Utah – Linebackers (2019–2025)
Sharrieff Shah	Associate Head Coach / Cornerbacks / Special teams coordinator	1st	Utah – Cornerbacks / special teams coordinator (2019–2025)
Mark Atuaia	Assistant Head Coach / Running backs	1st	Utah – Running backs (2025)
Jordan Gross	Offensive Line	1st	–
Luke Wells	Tight ends	1st	Kansas State – Tight ends (2025)
Chad Bumphis	Wide receivers	1st	Mississippi State – Wide receivers (2023–2025)
Luther Elliss	Defensive Tackles	5th	Idaho – Defensive line (2017–2021)
Inoke Breckterfield	Defensive ends	1st	Baylor – Defensive line (2024–2025)
Derrick Odum	Safeties	1st	San Jose State – Associate head coach / defensive coordinator (2018–2025)
Greg Argust	Director of Football Sports Performance	1st	Utah – Associate Director of Football Sports Performance (2018–2025)
Joe D’Orazio	General Manager	1st	USC – Offensive assistant (RB)/director of football strategy (2025)

== Individual accolades ==
=== National award winners ===
==== Players ====
- Ray Guy Award

2014: Tom Hackett
2015: Tom Hackett
2016: Mitch Wishnowsky

- Outland Trophy

2025: Spencer Fano

- Lou Groza Award

2017: Matt Gay

- Ted Hendricks Award

2014: Nate Orchard

- Polynesian College Player of the Year

2025: Spencer Fano

==== Coaches ====
- AFCA Coach of the Year

2008: Kyle Whittingham

- Paul "Bear" Bryant Award

2008: Kyle Whittingham

- Eddie Robinson Coach of the Year

2004: Urban Meyer

- Bobby Dodd Coach of the Year Award

2019: Kyle Whittingham

=== National award finalists ===
==== Players ====
- Heisman Trophy

2004: Alex Smith, 4th

- Outland Trophy

2002: Jordan Gross

- Ray Guy Award

2008: Louie Sakoda
2017: Mitch Wishnowsky
2018: Mitch Wishnowsky

- Lombardi Award

2023: Jonah Elliss

- Lott IMPACT Trophy

2023: Jonah Elliss

- Lou Groza Award

2008: Louie Sakoda

- Jim Thorpe Award

2022: Clark Phillips III

- Paul Hornung Award

2023: Sione Vaki

- Polynesian College Player of the Year

2022: Sataoa Laumea
2023: Jonah Elliss
2023: Sione Vaki
2024: Spencer Fano

- Ted Hendricks Award

2023: Jonah Elliss

==== Coaches ====
- Bobby Dodd Coach of the Year Award

2022: Kyle Whittingham

=== All-Americans ===
==== Unanimous ====
- 2015: Tom Hackett, P
- 2016: Mitch Wishnowsky, P
- 2022: Clark Phillips III, DB
- 2025: Spencer Fano, OL

==== Consensus ====
- 1994: Luther Elliss, DL
- 2002: Jordan Gross, OL
- 2006: Eric Weddle, DB
- 2008: Louie Sakoda, K
- 2014: Tom Hackett, P
- 2017: Matt Gay, K
- 2019: Bradlee Anae, DL
- 2021: Devin Lloyd, LB
- 2023: Jonah Elliss, LB

=== Conference Awards ===
==== Pac-12 Conference ====
- Offensive Player of the Year

2019: Zack Moss, RB

- Pat Tillman Defensive Player of the Year

2021: Devin Lloyd, LB

- Freshman Defensive Player of the Year

2021: Junior Tafuna, DT
2022: Lander Barton, LB

- Coach of the Year

2019: Kyle Whittingham
2021: Kyle Whittingham

- Morris Trophy

2011: Star Lotulelei
2014: Nate Orchard
2016: Isaac Asiata
2019: Bradlee Anae
2021: Nick Ford
2021: Mike Tafua

- Offensive Freshman of the Year (Coaches)

2020: Ty Jordan, RB

- Newcomer of the Year (AP)

2020: Ty Jordan, RB

- Defensive Freshman of the Year (Coaches)

2022: Clark Phillips III, CB

- Pac-12 Scholar-Athlete of the Year

2021: Britain Covey

- Pac-12 Championship Game MVP

2021: Devin Lloyd
2022: Cameron Rising

- Pac-12 All-Century Team

Tom Hackett, P

==== Mountain West Conference ====
- Offensive Player of the Year

2004: Alex Smith, QB
2008: Brian Johnson, QB

- Defensive Player of the Year

1999: John Frank, DE
2004: Morgan Scalley, DB
2005: Eric Weddle, DB
2006: Eric Weddle, DB

- Special Teams Player of the Year

2006: Louie Sakoda, PK/P
2007: Louie Sakoda, PK/P
2008: Louie Sakoda, PK/P

- Freshman of the Year

2000: Jason Kaufusi, DL

- Coach of the Year

2003: Urban Meyer
2004: Urban Meyer
2008: Kyle Whittingham

- 10th Anniversary Team

Alex Smith, QB
Jordan Gross, OL
Eric Weddle, DB
Steve Fifita, DL
Doug Kaufusi, OL

==== Western Athletic Conference ====
- Lineman of the Year

1962: Dave Costa, DT
1962: John Stipech, DT
1973: Ron Rydalch, DT

- Defensive Player of the Year

1981: Steve Clark, DT
1984: Filipo Mokofisi, LB
1994: Luther Elliss, DE

- Newcomer Player of the Year

1976: Jack Steptoe, RS
1978: Jeff Lyall, DE
1984: Eddie Johnson, RB
1985: Larry Egger, QB

- Freshman Player of the Year

1995: Chris Fuamatu-Maʻafala, RB

- Coach of the Year

1964: Ray Nagel
1969: Bill Meek
1978: Wayne Howard

- 15-Year All-Star Team

Steve Odom, RS – First Team
Roy Jefferson, WR – Second Team
Dave Costa, DT – Second Team
John Huddleston, LB – Second Team
Norm Thompson, DB – Second Team

=== Individual FBS records ===
- Most Yards Gained Per Attempt (Min. 60): Scott Mitchell – 10.5 (60 for 631)
- Most Touchdown Passes Caught by a Tight End (Season): Dennis Smith – 18
- Highest Average Gain Per Interception (Season, Min. 5 ints.): Norm Thompson – 5 for 259
- Highest Average Gain Per Kickoff Return (Game, Min. 3 rets.): Reggie Dunn – 3 for 222
- Most 100-yard Kickoff Returns (Game): Reggie Dunn – 2
- Most 100-yard Kickoff Returns (Season): Reggie Dunn – 4
- Most 100-yard Kickoff Returns (Career): Reggie Dunn – 5

=== Bowl game MVPs ===
- Ernest Adler: 1964 Liberty Bowl
- Kareem Leary, DB: 1992 Copper Bowl (defense)
- Henry Lusk, WR: 1993 Freedom Bowl
- Cal Beck, KR: 1994 Freedom Bowl
- Mike Anderson, RB: 1999 Las Vegas Bowl
- Dameon Hunter, RB: 2001 Las Vegas Bowl
- Brandon Warfield, RB: 2003 Liberty Bowl (offense)
- Lewis Powell, DL: 2003 Liberty Bowl (defense)
- Alex Smith, QB: 2005 Fiesta Bowl (co-offense)
- Paris Warren, WR: 2005 Fiesta Bowl (co-offense)
- Steve Fifita, NG: 2005 Fiesta Bowl (defense)
- Travis Latendresse, WR: 2005 Emerald Bowl (offense)
- Eric Weddle, CB: 2005 Emerald Bowl (defense)
- Louie Sakoda, K: 2006 Armed Forces Bowl
- Brian Johnson, QB: 2007 Poinsettia Bowl (offense)
- Joe Dale, DB: 2007 Poinsettia Bowl (defense)
- Brian Johnson, QB: 2009 Sugar Bowl
- Jordan Wynn, QB: 2009 Poinsettia Bowl (offense)
- Stevenson Sylvester, LB: 2009 Poinsettia Bowl (defense)
- John White, RB: 2011 Sun Bowl
- Travis Wilson, QB: 2014 Las Vegas Bowl
- Tevin Carter, CB: 2015 Las Vegas Bowl
- Joe Williams, RB: 2016 Foster Farms Bowl (offense)
- Julian Blackmon, DB: 2017 Heart of Dallas Bowl
- Devon Dampier, QB: 2025 Las Vegas Bowl

=== Other ===
- NFF Distinguished American Award

David O. McKay, 1968

- EA Sports NCAA Football cover athlete

Brian Johnson, 2010 (Playstation 3)

=== Lettered players ===
The following have been recognized as All-Time Letterman by University of Utah football.

- David Mckay, 1894
- Lowell Romney, 1914–1916
- Bob Davis, 1928–1929
- Jack Johnson 1930–1932 — Pro Bowl offensive tackle
- Joe Wirthlin, 1936
- Dave Costa (1961–1962) — four time AFL All-Pro defensive tackle
- Norm Chow (1965–1967) — Broyles Award winner for best assistant coach in college football
- Manny Fernandez (1965–1967) — second team All-Pro defensive tackle and starter on Miami's No-Name Defense
- Bob Trumpy (1966) — Pro Bowl tight end and color commentator for NFL broadcasts
- Steve Odom (1971–1973) — Pro Bowl wide receiver
- Del "Popcorn" Rodgers (1978–1981) — third-round NFL Running back for San Francisco 49ers won Super Bowl XXIII
- Chris Fuamatu-Ma'afala (1995–1997)— Running Back and sixth-round NFL Draft Selection Pittsburgh Steelers
- Barry Sims (1995–1996) — starting Guard for the Oakland Raiders Super Bowl XXXVII
- Andre Dyson (1997–2000)
- Jordan Gross (1999–2002) — All-Pro offensive tackle with the Carolina Panthers
- Zane Beadles (2006–2009) — All-MWC Left Guard, First team All-American [FWAA] Denver Broncos second-round NFL draft pick, 2013 Pro Bowl
- Sean Smith (2006–2008) — Miami Dolphins cornerback and second-round pick 2009 draft
- Paul Kruger (2007–2008) — All-MWC defensive lineman, Baltimore Ravens second-round draft pick
- Star Lotulelei (2010–2012) — consensus first team All-American Defensive Tackle, All-Pac-12, Carolina Panthers first-round NFL draft pick
- Tom Hackett (2012–2015) — 2014 and 2015 winner of the Ray Guy Award for the nation's best punter and named to the Pac-12 All-Century Team
- Mitch Wishnowsky (2016–2019) — 2016 winner of the Ray Guy Award for the nation's best punter

=== Retired numbers ===
In 2021 Utah retired the number 22 in honor of Ty Jordan and Aaron Lowe. Number 22 is the first and only number retired in program history.

Utah Utes retired numbers
No.	Player	Pos.	Tenure	No. ret.	Ref.
22	Ty Jordan	RB	2020	2021	
22	Aaron Lowe	CB	2019–2021	2021	

== Hall of Fame inductees ==
College Football Hall of Fame
Name	Time at Utah	Position	Inducted	Ref
Ike J. Armstrong	1925–1949	Head coach	1957	
Alex Smith	2002–2004	QB	2024	
Urban Meyer	2003–2004	Head coach	2025	
Eric Weddle	2003–2006	S	2026	

=== Pro Football Hall of Fame ===
- Larry Wilson – Class of 1978
- Mac Speedie – Class of 2020

=== Canadian Football Hall of Fame ===
- Ray Elgaard – Class of 2002

=== Polynesian Football Hall of Fame ===
- Luther John Elliss, DT – Class of 2015
- Ma'ake Kemoeatu, DT – Class of 2018
- Chris Kemoeatu, OL – Class of 2025

=== Rocky Mountain Athletic Conference Hall of Fame ===
- Ike Armstrong, Coach/Admin – Class of 2016
- Frank Christensen, FB – Class of 2019

=== Pac-12 Conference Hall of Honor ===
- Steve Smith Sr., WR – Class of 2019

=== Crimson Club Hall of Fame ===
The following individuals are members of The University of Utah Athletics' Crimson Club Hall of Fame:

=== Players ===
- Frank Christensen
- Thornton Morris
- Larry Wilson (1957–1959) — Pro Football Hall of Fame defensive back
- Roy L. Jefferson (1962–1964) — three time Pro Bowl wide receiver
- Mac Speedie (1939–1941) — Pro Football Hall of Fame wide receiver
- C. Fred Gehrke
- Lee Grosscup
- Stephan T. Odum
- Tom Dublinski
- Tally Stevens
- Karl Schleckman (1934, 1936–37)
- Stuart Vaughan
- Marv Fleming
- Ronald G. Coleman
- Marv Bateman (1969–1971) — second team All Pro punter
- Erroll Tucker
- Paul McDonough
- Norm Thompson (1969–1970) — cornerback for nine seasons in the NFL
- Luther Elliss (1991–1994) — Pro Bowl defensive tackle
- Scott Mitchell (1987–1989) — quarterback for eleven seasons in the NFL
- Jeff Griffin
- Kevin Dyson (1994–1997) — starting wide receiver for the Tennessee Titans during Super Bowl XXXIV
- Jamal Anderson (1992–1993) — All Pro running back for the Atlanta Falcons during Super Bowl XXXIII
- Steve Smith (1999–2000) — three time All-Pro wide receiver with the Carolina Panthers
- Mike Anderson (1998–1999) — 2000 NFL Offensive Rookie of the Year
- Eddie Johnson
- Alex Smith (2002–2004) — Heisman Trophy finalist, first pick of the 2005 NFL draft
- Anthony Brown
- Chris Kemoeatu (2001–2004) – first team All-American 2004 sixth-round NFL draft pick Pittsburgh Steelers
- Eric Weddle (2003–2006)— All-Pro free safety with the San Diego Chargers
- Louie Sakoda (2005–2008) — consensus All-American placekicker and All-American punter

=== Coaches ===
- Ike J. Armstrong (1925–1949)
- Ron McBride (1990–2002)
- George Seifert (1964) — two time Super Bowl winning head coach

== NFL draft picks and active alumni ==
=== First-round NFL draft picks ===
Draft Year	Pick	Player	Selected by	Position
1959	10	Lee Grosscup	New York Giants	QB
1971	17	Norm Thompson	St. Louis Cardinals	CB
1995	20	Luther Elliss	Detroit Lions	DT
1998	16	Kevin Dyson	Tennessee Oilers	WR
2003	8	Jordan Gross	Carolina Panthers	OT
2005	1	Alex Smith	San Francisco 49ers	QB
2013	14	Star Lotulelei	Carolina Panthers	DT
2017	20	Garett Bolles	Denver Broncos	OT
2022	27	Devin Lloyd	Jacksonville Jaguars	LB
2023	25	Dalton Kincaid	Buffalo Bills	TE
2026	9	Spencer Fano	Cleveland Browns	OT
2026	28	Caleb Lomu	New England Patriots	OT

=== Active alumni in the NFL ===
Updated: October 2026.

==== Players ====
- Tyler Huntley: Baltimore Ravens
- Cole Bishop: Buffalo Bills
- Dalton Kincaid: Buffalo Bills
- Devin Lloyd: Carolina Panthers
- Jaylon Johnson: Chicago Bears
- Clark Phillips III: Chicago Bears
- Nephi Sewell: Chicago Bears
- Logan Fano: Cleveland Browns
- Spencer Fano: Cleveland Browns
- Dallen Bentley: Denver Broncos
- Garett Bolles: Denver Broncos
- Jonah Elliss: Denver Broncos
- Caleb Lohner: Denver Broncos
- Karene Reid: Denver Broncos
- Sione Vaki: Detroit Lions
- Junior Tafuna: Houston Texans
- Matt Gay: Las Vegas Raiders
- Lander Barton: Los Angeles Chargers
- Zemaiah Vaughn: Minnesota Vikings
- Caleb Lomu: New England Patriots
- Mitch Wishnowsky: New England Patriots
- Julian Blackmon: New Orleans Saints
- Devaughn Vele: New Orleans Saints
- Tim Patrick: New York Jets
- Britain Covey: Philadelphia Eagles
- Connor O'Toole: Seattle Seahawks
- Cody Barton: Tennessee Titans
- Terrell Burgess: Tennessee Titans
- Mohamoud Diabate: Tennessee Titans
- Tanoa Togiai: Washington Commanders

==== Coaches ====
- Mike McCoy: Las Vegas Raiders
- Brian Johnson: Los Angeles Rams

== Future opponents ==
=== Big-12 opponents ===
On November 1, 2023, Utah's Big-12 opponents from 2024 through 2027 were revealed, with their rivalry game against BYU being a protected annual game.

Future Utah Utes football schedule
2026	2027
vs BYU	vs Arizona
vs Houston	vs Baylor
vs Kansas	vs Oklahoma State
vs West Virginia	vs TCU
at Arizona	vs UCF
at Cincinnati	at Arizona State
at Colorado	at BYU
at Iowa State	at Kansas State
at TCU	at Texas Tech

=== Non-conference opponents ===
Announced schedules as of October 2, 2026. Following the release of the Big 12 Scheduling Matrix for 2024–27, key changes included Utah vs. BYU becoming a protected rivalry and will become an annual conference game. The previously scheduled 2026 game against Houston becomes a Utah home game while the 2027 game against Houston is dropped.

2027	2028	2029	2030	2031	2032	2033
Southern Utah (Aug. 26)	Utah Tech (Aug. 31)	Weber State (Aug. 30)	Utah Tech (Aug. 29)	at Utah State (Aug. 28)	at LSU (Sep. 11)	Utah State (Sep. 1)
Miami (FL) Vegas Kickoff Classic (Sep. 4)	Nevada (Sep. 9)	at Arkansas (Sep. 15)	UCLA (Sep. 7)	LSU (Sep. 6)		Wisconsin (Sep. 10)
Wyoming (Sep. 11)	at Wisconsin (Sep. 16)		Utah State (Sep. 14)			

== Traditions ==
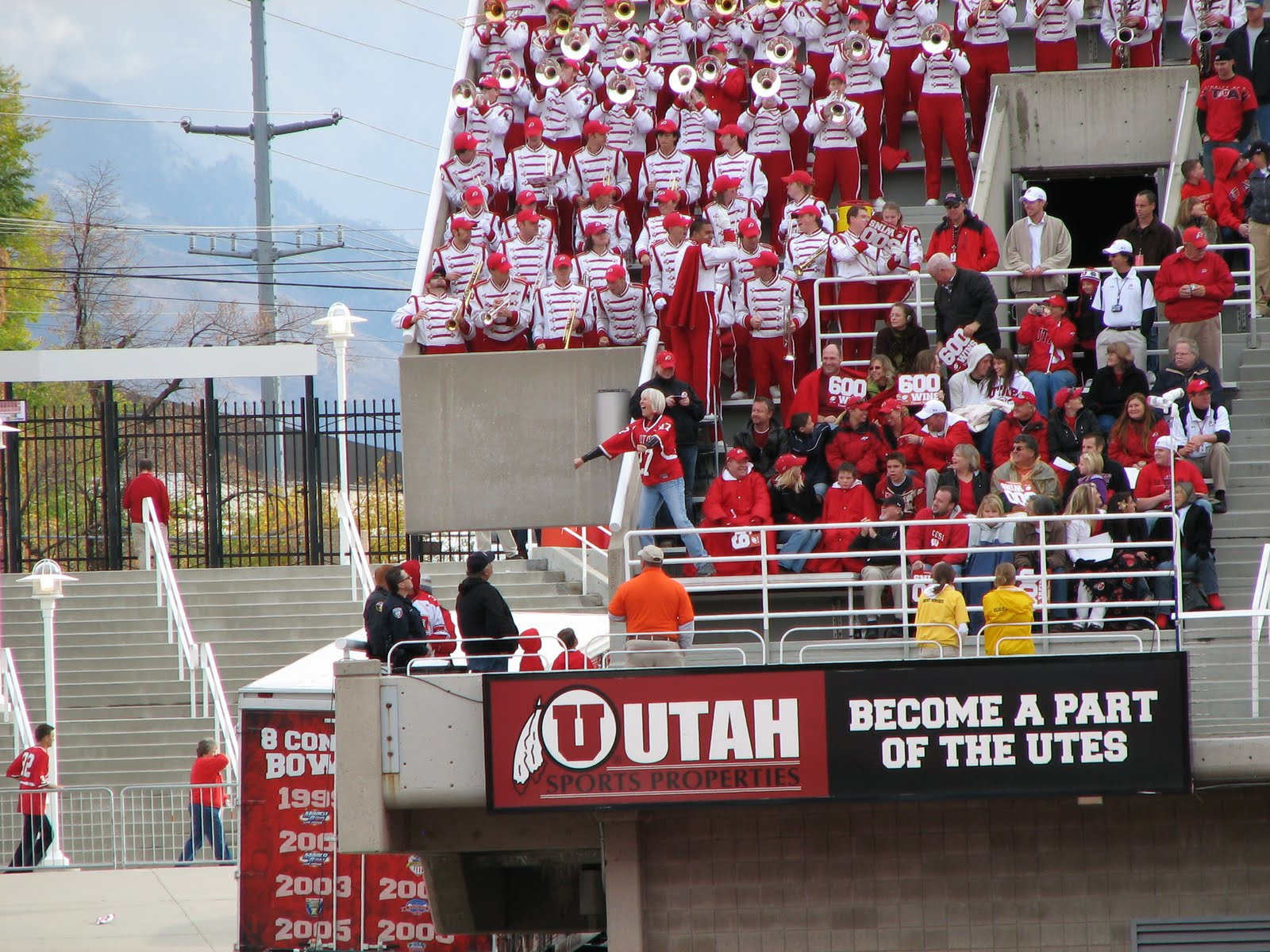
Crazy Lady (center) dances during Blues Brothers' theme

=== Blues Brothers' theme ===
Just before the third quarter for each home game, the Utah marching band plays the Blues Brothers theme (Otis Redding's "I Can't Turn You Loose") while a female fan dances in front of them. Originally, the song was played between the third and fourth quarters, but Utah officials moved it to halftime at the start of the 2012 season. The tradition was started by "Bubbles", an elderly fan who danced enthusiastically to the song when the band first played it and thereby helped energize the crowd. The crowd so enjoyed the song and Bubbles' performance that it soon became a tradition. After years of doing her dance, Bubbles retired so "Crazy Lady" took over. Crazy Lady received her nickname from the MUSS, which is the "Mighty Utah Student Section". Before the Blues Brothers' theme begins, the MUSS chants for Crazy Lady to do her dance. Crazy Lady finds her nickname "endearing."

=== Ute Thunder ===
Since 1968, the University of Utah's Army ROTC department has operated a cannon on the sidelines called Ute Thunder. A few ROTC cadets compose the cannon crew, which is trained to fire the cannon. After each Utah score, the cannon crew fires a 10-gauge shotgun blank. The cannon was built in 1904 and was used during World War I for training. The cannon was refurbished in 2003 to repair the firing mechanism and wooden wheels.

=== 3rd Down Jump ===
The Mighty Utah Student Section (or MUSS) is the student organization in charge of the Utah student sections across all Utah athletics. Leading up to and during a visiting team's third down attempts, a member of the MUSS hoists up a sign that reads "3rd Down Jump" and races up the aisles of the student section. The students collectively hold up three fingers and begin yelling and jumping in an attempt to deride the third down attempts of the visiting team. While not directly invited to do so, the rest of the stadium is also welcome to participate in the 3rd Down Jump. The tradition is considered by fans to be very effective at deriding opposing team's efforts at converting on third down.

=== "Moment of Loudness" ===
Since the start of 2021 Football season, a moment of loudness takes place between the third and fourth quarters of every home football game. The tradition was started to honor Ty Jordan, the Utah running back who died during the 2020 offseason. Ty Jordan wore the number 22 – thus 22 seconds of loudness was born. The tradition was later updated to tribute Aaron Lowe, a Utah CB who was a victim of a fatal shooting during the 2021 football season. Lowe was the recipient of the Ty Jordan memorial scholarship and wore the number 22 to honor Jordan. Beginning in the 2022 season, the "22 seconds of loudness" was changed to the "Moment of Loudness" and was preceded by a tribute video, which would be displayed on the stadium jumbotron. With the change, the moment of loudness also moved from being 22 seconds long to being an undetermined amount of time, changing game to game. The tribute includes a monologue of the legacy of Ty Jordan and Aaron Lowe and an encouragement for fans and players to "become 22% better every day." Prior to the game, fans are invited to submit photos on the Utah Football website of loved ones who were Utah fans and who recently died. At the conclusion of the "Moment of Loudness" video, the photos of the Utah fans who have died are displayed on the jumbotron. Fans are invited to "let [their] voices ring out" and fans in attendance collectively produce as much noise as they can to honor the legacy of Ty Jordan and Aaron Lowe, as well as all of the Utah Fans who had recently died. During daytime games, fans typically hold up two fingers on both hands during the moment of loudness. Additionally, during night games, fans also hold up their phone flashlights. Opposing team's visiting fans typically also participate in the moment of loudness, considering it to be an honorary tradition.
