= Sione Vaki =

American football player (born 2001)

No. 33 – Detroit Lions
- Position: Running back
- Roster status: Active

Personal information
- Born: July 30, 2001 (age 25); Antioch, California, U.S.
- Listed height: 5 ft 11 in (1.80 m)
- Listed weight: 216 lb (98 kg)

Career information
- High school: Liberty (Brentwood, California)
- College: Utah (2022–2023)
- NFL draft: 2024: 4th round, 132nd overall pick

Career history
- Detroit Lions (2024–present)

Awards and highlights
- PFWA All-Rookie Team (2024); Second-team All-American (2023); 2x First-team All-Pac-12 (2023)

Career NFL statistics as of Week 10, 2026
- Rushing yards: 181
- Rushing average: 4.2
- Receptions: 11
- Receiving yards: 118
- Return yards: 94
- Total tackles: 18
- Forced fumbles: 1
- Stats at Pro Football Reference

Sione Vaki (born July 30, 2001) is an American professional football running back for the Detroit Lions of the National Football League (NFL). He played college football for the Utah Utes as a two-way player. Vaki was selected by the Lions in the fourth round of the 2024 NFL draft.

== Early life ==
Vaki attended Liberty High School in Brentwood, California. In high school, he played on both sides of the ball. On offense he rushed for 401 yards and seven touchdowns, while also bringing in 107 receptions for 2,203 yards and 32 touchdowns. On defense, he notched 142 tackles with one being for a loss, five interceptions, four fumble recoveries, two forced fumbles, and two defensive touchdowns, Vaki also returned a kickoff for a touchdown. Vaki committed to play college football at the University of Utah.

== College career ==
In his true freshman season, Vaki totalled 41 tackles with 3.5 going for a loss, three pass deflections, and a forced fumble in the 2022 season.

In week one of the 2023 season, he recorded his first career interception versus the Florida Gators. In week seven, Vaki had a breakout game where he played both ways of the ball as he rushed 15 times for 158 yards and two touchdown to help the Utes beat California. In the following week, he rushed nine times for 68 yards, while also hauling in five receptions for 149 yards and two touchdowns, while also notching two tackles and having the best coverage grade on the Utes, as helped them upset USC 34–32. The rest of the season, the Utes formulated a plan to use Vaki more on offense.

As a sophomore, Vaki finished the season with 51 tackles, 8.5 tackles for a loss, two sacks and two interceptions on defense. On offense he had 317 yards rushing (7.5 yards per carry) and two rushing touchdowns. As well as 11 receptions for 203 yards and three receiving touchdowns. He was voted to the first-team All-Pac-12 team twice in 2023, both as a safety and a special teams/all-purpose player. Following the 2023 season, Vaki declared for the 2024 NFL draft after playing two seasons of college football, as he went on a three-year mission trip following his high school graduation.

== Professional career ==
Pre-draft measurables
Height	Weight	Arm length	Hand span	Wingspan	40-yard dash	10-yard split	20-yard split	20-yard shuttle	Three-cone drill	Vertical jump	Broad jump	Bench press
5 ft 11 1/8 in (1.81 m)	210 lb (95 kg)	29 1/8 in (0.74 m)	8 5/8 in (0.22 m)	6 ft 0 1/8 in (1.83 m)	4.51 s	1.57 s	2.59 s	4.28 s	7.16 s	39.5 in (1.00 m)	10 ft 5 in (3.18 m)	20 reps
All values from NFL Combine/Pro Day

Vaki was selected in the fourth round, 132nd overall, by the Detroit Lions in the 2024 NFL draft. He was named to the PFWA All-Rookie Team.

== NFL career statistics ==
=== Offense ===
Year	Team	Games		Rushing					Receiving					Fumbles	
Year	Team	GP	GS	Att	Yds	Avg	Lng	TD	Rec	Yds	Avg	Lng	TD	Fum	Lost
2024	DET	16	0	6	14	2.3	7	0	3	37	12.3	17	0	0	0
2025	DET	11	0	1	4	4.0	4	0	—	—	—	—	—	0	0
2026	DET	9	0	36	163	4.5	12	0	8	81	10.1	17	0	0	0
Career		36	0	43	181	4.2	12	0	11	118	10.7	17	0	0	0

=== Defense / special teams ===
Year	Team	Tackles				Returning					Fumbles			
Year	Team	Comb	Solo	Ast	Sack	Ret	Yds	Avg	Lng	TD	FF	FR	Yds	TD
2024	DET	8	8	0	0.0	2	55	27.5	36	0	1	0	0	0
2025	DET	10	6	4	0.0	2	39	19.5	29	0	0	0	0	0
Career		18	14	4	0.0	4	94	23.5	36	0	1	0	0	0

== Personal life ==
Vaki lost his mother Oto’ota due to cancer. Vaki is a member of the Church of Jesus Christ of Latter-day Saints; he started to serve a mission for the church in the Nuku'alofa, Tonga, Mission, but was reassigned to the West Salt Lake City, Utah, Mission due to the COVID-19 pandemic.
