= Clark Phillips III =

American football player (born 2001)

No. 20 – Chicago Bears
- Position: Cornerback
- Roster status: Active

Personal information
- Born: December 19, 2001 (age 24); Lakewood, California, U.S.
- Listed height: 5 ft 9 in (1.75 m)
- Listed weight: 185 lb (84 kg)

Career information
- High school: La Habra (La Habra, California)
- College: Utah (2020–2022)
- NFL draft: 2023: 4th round, 113th overall pick

Career history
- Atlanta Falcons (2023–2025); Chicago Bears (2026–present)

Awards and highlights
- Pac-12 Defensive Player of the Year (2022); Unanimous All-American (2022); First-team All-Pac-12 (2022); Second-team All-Pac-12 (2021)

Career NFL statistics as of Week 9, 2026
- Total tackles: 65
- Forced fumbles: 2
- Fumble recoveries: 1
- Pass deflections: 10
- Interceptions: 1
- Stats at Pro Football Reference

Clark Dwaine Phillips III (born December 19, 2001) is an American professional football cornerback for the Chicago Bears of the National Football League (NFL). He played college football for the Utah Utes, where he was named a unanimous All-American.

== Early life ==
Phillips III attended La Habra High School in La Habra, California. As a senior in 2019, he was the Orange County Register Defensive Player of the Year. He originally committed to Ohio State University to play college football but changed to the University of Utah. He was the highest rated recruit to ever sign with Utah.

== College career ==
Phillips III became an immediate starter his true freshman year in 2020. He started all five games, recording 25 tackles, one interception and one touchdown. He again started all 14 games in 2021 and had 63 tackles, two interceptions and one touchdown.

== Professional career ==
Pre-draft measurables
| Height | Weight | Arm length | Hand span | Wingspan | 40-yard dash | 10-yard split | 20-yard split | 20-yard shuttle | Vertical jump | Bench press |
|---|---|---|---|---|---|---|---|---|---|---|
| 5 ft 9 in (1.75 m) | 184 lb (83 kg) | 29 1/8 in (0.74 m) | 9 1/8 in (0.23 m) | 5 ft 10 3/4 in (1.80 m) | 4.51 s | 1.51 s | 2.58 s | 4.21 s | 33.0 in (0.84 m) | 18 reps |
All values from NFL Combine/Pro Day

=== Atlanta Falcons ===
Phillips was selected by the Atlanta Falcons in the fourth round, 113th overall, of the 2023 NFL draft.

On October 18, 2025, Phillips was placed on injured reserve due to a triceps injury.

=== Chicago Bears ===
On August 30, 2026, Phillips and a 2027 fifth-round pick were traded to the Chicago Bears in exchange for Gervon Dexter. Phillips saw limited action in the first half of the 2026 season, only playing on 14 percent of the Bears' defensive snaps through the first nine games. Injuries to the secondary led to more playing time in Week 11 against the New Orleans Saints, during which Phillips recorded a sack and a forced fumble.

== NFL career statistics ==
Legend
| **Bold** | Career high |

| Year | Team | GP | GS | Tackles | | | | | Interceptions | | | | Fumbles | |
| Year | Team | GP | GS | Solo | Ast | Tot | TFL | Sk | Int | Yds | TD | PD | FF | FR |
|---|---|---|---|---|---|---|---|---|---|---|---|---|---|---|
| 2023 | ATL | 11 | **5** | 22 | 5 | 27 | 1 | 0.0 | 0 | 0 | 0 | **5** | 0 | 0 |
| 2024 | ATL | **16** | 2 | **27** | **8** | **35** | **3** | 0.0 | **1** | **45** | 0 | **5** | **2** | **1** |
| 2025 | ATL | 1 | 0 | 1 | 0 | 1 | 0 | 0.0 | 0 | 0 | 0 | 0 | 0 | 0 |
| 2026 | CHI | 7 | 0 | 2 | 0 | 2 | 0 | 0.0 | 0 | 0 | 0 | 0 | 0 | 0 |
| Career | | 35 | 7 | 52 | 13 | 65 | 4 | 0.0 | 1 | 45 | 0 | 10 | 2 | 1 |
