= 2004 UNLV Rebels football team =

American college football season

2004 UNLV Rebels football
- Conference: Mountain West Conference
- Record: 2–9 (1–6 MW)
- Head coach: John Robinson (6th season)
- Offensive coordinator: Bruce Snyder (1st season)
- Defensive coordinator: Mike Bradeson (5th season)
- Home stadium: Sam Boyd Stadium

2004 Mountain West Conference football standings
	Conf.			Overall
Team	W		L	W		L
No. 4 Utah $	7	–	0	12	–	0
New Mexico	5	–	2	7	–	5
BYU	4	–	3	5	–	6
Wyoming	3	–	4	7	–	5
Air Force	3	–	4	5	–	6
Colorado State	3	–	4	4	–	7
San Diego State	2	–	5	4	–	7
UNLV	1	–	6	2	–	9
$ – Conference champion and BCS representative as top non-AQ school to meet automatic qualification criteria; Rankings from AP Poll

The 2004 UNLV Rebels football team represented the University of Nevada, Las Vegas (UNLV) as a member of the Mountain West Conference (MW) during the 2004 NCAA Division I-A football season. Led by John Robinson in his sixth and final season as head coach, the Rebels compiled an overall record of 2–9 record with mark of 1–6 in conference play, placing last out of eight teams in the MW. The team played home games at Sam Boyd Stadium in Whitney, Nevada.

Robinson resigned after the season.

== Schedule ==
Date	Time	Opponent	Site	TV	Result	Attendance
September 5	5:00 p.m.	at No. 14 Tennessee*	Neyland Stadium; Knoxville, TN	ESPN	L 17–42	108,625
September 11	9:00 a.m.	at No. 21 Wisconsin*	Camp Randall Stadium; Madison, WI	ESPN	L 3–18	82,071
September 18	7:00 p.m.	Air Force	Sam Boyd Stadium; Whitney, NV		L 10–27	23,823
September 25	7:00 p.m.	Utah State*	Sam Boyd Stadium; Whitney, NV	SPW	L 21–31	19,116
October 2	7:00 p.m.	Nevada*	Sam Boyd Stadium; Whitney, NV (Fremont Cannon)		W 48–13	27,596
October 8	7:00 p.m.	at BYU	LaVell Edwards Stadium; Provo, UT	ESPN2	W 24–20	56,341
October 16	12:00 p.m.	New Mexico^{†}	Sam Boyd Stadium; Whitney, NV	ESPN Plus	L 20–24	19,065
October 23	4:00 p.m.	at No. 9 Utah	Rice–Eccles Stadium; Salt Lake City, UT	ABC	L 28–63	40,341
November 6	4:00 p.m.	Wyoming	Sam Boyd Stadium; Whitney, NV	SPW	L 45–53 ^{3OT}	19,752
November 13	9:00 a.m.	at Colorado State	Hughes Stadium; Fort Collins, CO	SPW	L 10–45	14,876
November 20	7:00 p.m.	at San Diego State	Qualcomm Stadium; San Diego, CA	SPW	L 3–21	25,519
*Non-conference game; ^{†}Homecoming; Rankings from AP Poll released prior to the game; All times are in Pacific time

== Roster ==
2004 UNLV Rebels football team roster
Players
Coaches
Offense

Pos.	#	Name	Class
RB	10	Dominique Dorsey	Sr
TE	86	Greg Estandia	Sr
WR	21	Tremayne Kirkland	So
QB	15	Shane Steichen	So
QB	6	Scott Turner	Jr

Defense

Pos.	#	Name	Class
LB	49	Ryan Claridge	Sr
LB	55	Adam Seward	Sr

Special teams

Pos.	#	Name	Class

Head coach

- John Robinson

Coordinators/assistant coaches

Legend

- (C) Team captain
- (S) Suspended
- (I) Ineligible
- Injured
- Redshirt
