= 2004 Mountain West Conference football season =

- League: NCAA Division I-A
- Sport: football
- Teams: 8

2005 NFL Draft
- Top draft pick: QB Alex Smith, Utah
- Picked by: San Francisco 49ers, 1st overall

Regular season
- Season champions: Utah
- Runners-up: New Mexico
- Top scorer: Steve Savoy (102 points)

Football seasons
- 2003 2005

2004 Mountain West Conference football standings
	Conf.			Overall
Team	W		L	W		L
No. 4 Utah $	7	–	0	12	–	0
New Mexico	5	–	2	7	–	5
BYU	4	–	3	5	–	6
Wyoming	3	–	4	7	–	5
Air Force	3	–	4	5	–	6
Colorado State	3	–	4	4	–	7
San Diego State	2	–	5	4	–	7
UNLV	1	–	6	2	–	9
$ – Conference champion and BCS representative as top non-AQ school to meet automatic qualification criteria; Rankings from AP Poll

The 2004 Mountain West Conference football season was the sixth since eight former members of the Western Athletic Conference banded together to form the Mountain West Conference. It was the last season of the conference's original eight-team line up, as Texas Christian University (TCU) had agreed to join the conference for the 2005 season. Utah won the conference championship in 2004, the Utes' third title since the league began in 1999. On the strength of their perfect 11–0 record in the regular season, Utah became the first team from a BCS non-AQ conference to be invited to a Bowl Championship Series (BCS) bowl when they accepted an invitation to play Pittsburgh in the Fiesta Bowl.

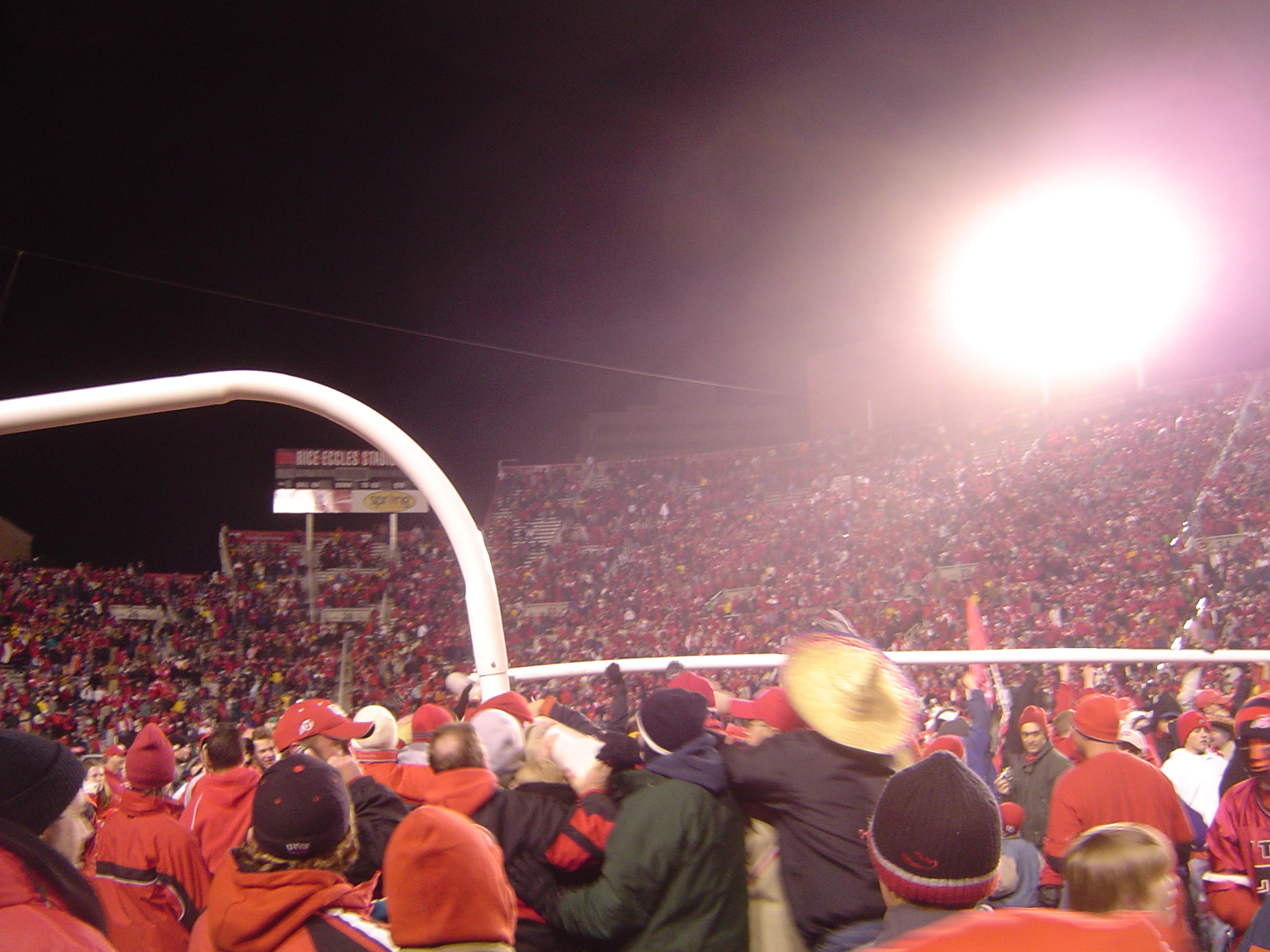
Utah Utes fans rush the field and carry the goalpost after defeating rival BYU, completing a perfect regular season, and becoming the first BCS Buster by clinching a spot in the 2005 Fiesta Bowl (hence the sombrero).

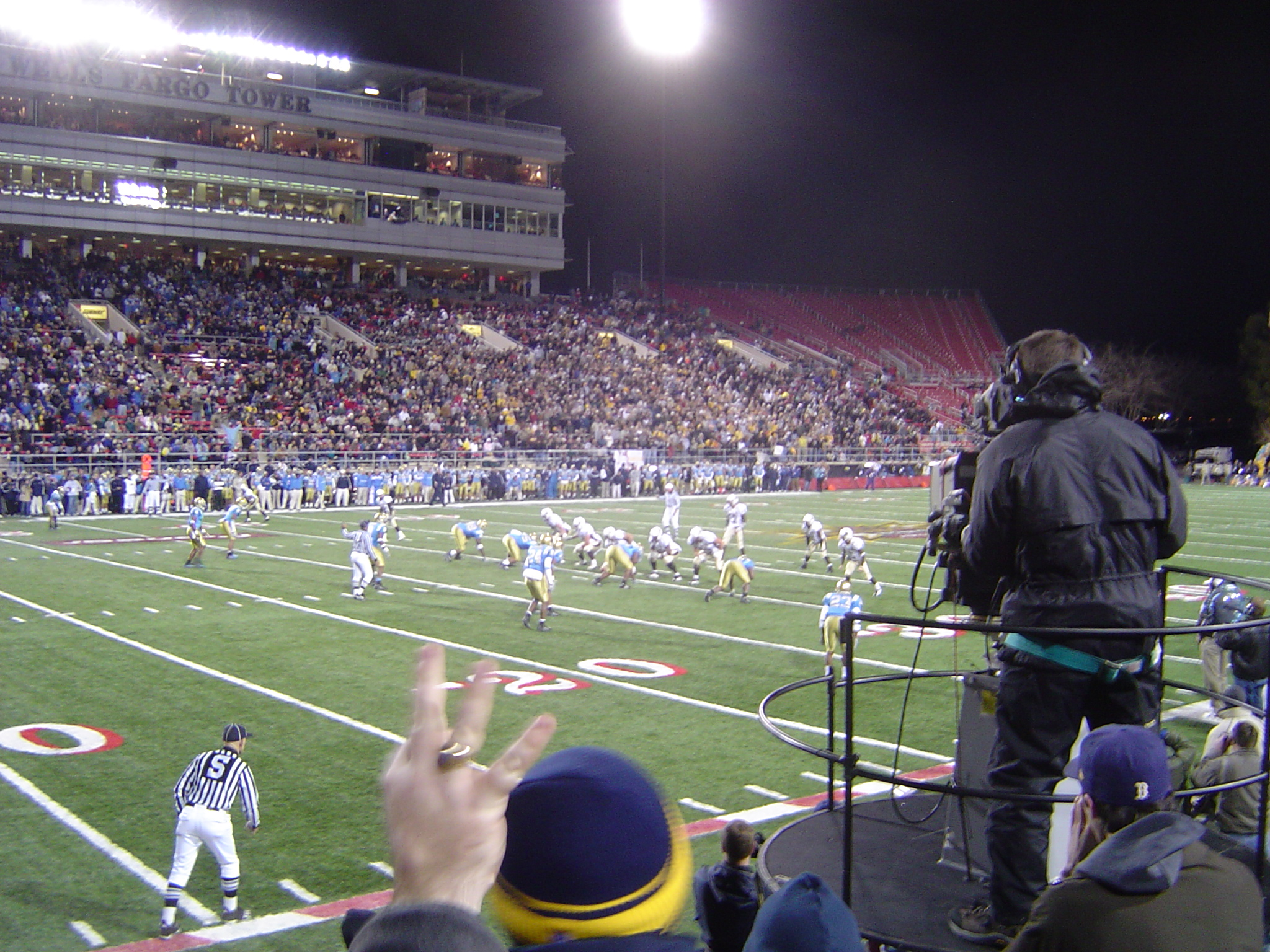
UCLA vs. Wyoming in the 2004 Las Vegas Bowl

== Bowl games ==
Bowl	Date	Stadium	City	Result
Las Vegas Bowl	December 23, 2004	Sam Boyd Stadium	Las Vegas	Wyoming 24, UCLA 21
Emerald Bowl	December 30, 2004	SBC Park	San Francisco	Navy 34, New Mexico 19
Fiesta Bowl	January 1, 2005	Sun Devil Stadium	Tempe, Arizona	Utah 35, Pittsburgh 7

== Awards ==
- Coach of the Year: Urban Meyer, Utah
- Offensive Player of the Year: QB Alex Smith, Jr, Utah
- Co-Defensive Players of the Year: LB Kirk Morrison, Sr, San Diego State and DB Morgan Scalley, Sr, Utah
- Freshman of the Year: WR Austin Collie, BYU

== Pre-Season All Conference Team ==
Offense
Quarterback	Alex Smith, Jr, Utah
Running back	Darnell Stephens, Sr, Air Force; DonTrell Moore, Jr, New Mexico
Wide receiver	David Anderson, Jr, Colorado State; Todd Watkins, Jr, BYU
Tight end	Joel Dreessen, Sr, Colorado State
Offensive Line	Ryan Cook, Jr, New Mexico; Trenton Franz, Sr, Wyoming; Chris Kemoeatu, Sr, Utah; Erik Pears, Sr, Colorado State; Claude Terrell, Sr, New Mexico
Kicker	Deric Yaussi, Jr, Wyoming
Kick returner	Bo Nagahi, Sr, Utah

Defense
Defensive line	Steve Fifita, Sr, Utah; Zach Morris, Sr, Wyoming; Marcus Parker, Jr, New Mexico; Sione Pouha, Sr, Utah
Linebacker	Kirk Morrison, Sr, San Diego State; Brady Poppinga, Sr, BYU; John Rudzinski, Sr, Air Force
Defensive back	Jamaal Brimmer, Sr, UNLV; Aaron Francisco, Sr, BYU; Brandon Payne, Sr, New Mexico; Morgan Scalley, Sr, Utah
Punter	Matt Payne, Sr, BYU

== All-Conference teams ==
First-team:

Offense
Quarterback	Alex Smith, Jr, Utah
Running back	Dominique Dorsey, Sr, UNLV; DonTrell Moore, Jr, New Mexico
Wide receiver	Steve Savoy, So, Utah; Todd Watkins, Jr, BYU
Tight end	Joel Dreessen, Sr, Colorado State
Offensive Line	Ryan Cook, Jr, New Mexico; Trenton Franz, Sr, Wyoming; Chris Kemoeatu, Sr, Utah; Erik Pears, Sr, Colorado State; Claude Terrell, Sr, New Mexico
Kicker	Deric Yaussi, Jr, Wyoming
Kick returner	Hoost Marsh, Fr, Wyoming

Defense
Defensive line	Steve Fifita, Sr, Utah; Zach Morris, Sr, Wyoming; Marcus Parker, Jr, New Mexico; Sione Pouha, Sr, Utah
Linebacker	Kirk Morrison, Sr, San Diego State; Brady Poppinga, Sr, BYU; Nick Speegle, Sr, New Mexico
Defensive back	Jamaal Brimmer, Sr, UNLV; Aaron Francisco, Sr, BYU; Brandon Payne, Sr, New Mexico; Morgan Scalley, Sr, Utah
Punter	Matt Payne, Sr, BYU

Second-team:

Offense
Quarterback	John Beck, So, BYU
Running back	Curtis Brown, So, BYU; Marty Johnson, Sr, Utah
Wide receiver	David Anderson, Jr, Colorado State; Paris Warren, Sr, Utah
Tight end	John Wadkowski, Jr, Wyoming
Offensive Line	Jon Wilson, Jr, Air Force; Scott Young, Sr, BYU; Mike Kracalik, Sr, San Diego State; Joel Critchfield, Sr, UNLV; Jesse Boone, Jr, Utah
Kicker	Matt Payne, Sr, BYU
Kick returner	Jovon Bouknight, Jr, Wyoming

Defense
Defensive line	Shaun Nua, Sr, BYU; Patrick Goodpaster, Sr, Colorado State; Blake Lobel, Sr, San Diego State; Dusty Hoffschneider, Jr, Wyoming
Linebacker	Matt McCoy, Jr, San Diego State; Ryan Claridge, Sr, UNLV; Adam Seward, Sr, UNLV
Defensive back	Josh Bazinet, Sr, New Mexico; Gabriel Fulbright, Jr, New Mexico; Eric Weddle, So, Utah; Derrick Martin, So, Wyoming
Punter	Adam Brooks, Jr, Wyoming
