= 2004 Emerald Bowl =

- Emerald Bowl logo prior to 2005
New Mexico Lobos	Navy Midshipmen
(7–4)	(9–2)
Mountain West	Independent
19	34
Head coach: Rocky Long	Head coach: Paul Johnson
	1	2	3	4	Total
New Mexico	7	12	0	0	19
Navy	14	10	7	3	34
- Date: December 30, 2004
- Season: 2004
- Stadium: SBC Park
- Location: San Francisco, California
- MVP: Aaron Polanco (Offense); Vaughn Kelley (Defense)
- Favorite: New Mexico by 1
- Referee: Ed Ardito (C-USA)
- Halftime show: Astoria High School Marching Band
- Attendance: 30,563
- Payout: US$750,000

United States TV coverage
- Network: ESPN2
- Announcers: Eric Collins and Andre Ware
- Nielsen ratings: 2.04

The 2004 Emerald Bowl was a post-season college football bowl game between the New Mexico Lobos and the Navy Midshipmen on December 30, 2004, at SBC Park in San Francisco, United States. The game, which Navy won with a final score of 34–19, was highlighted by a 26-play drive from the Midshipmen that took up almost 15 minutes of game time and set the record for the longest drive in a National Collegiate Athletic Association (NCAA) college football game. The contest was the third time the Emerald Bowl was played and the final game of the 2004 NCAA football season for both teams.

The conference independent Navy Midshipmen, who finished the regular season with a 9–2 record, accepted an invitation to play in the game on November 22, 2004. Eight days later, the 7–4 New Mexico Lobos agreed to fill the open spot reserved for a Mountain West Conference team. Leading up to the game, sports writers predicted that a major highlight of the contest would be the rushing offenses of Midshipmen head coach Paul Johnson and Lobos head coach Rocky Long; both teams ranked in the top rushing offenses in the Football Bowl Subdivision (FBS). The Lobos also ranked as one of the nation's top rushing defenses.

The game began at 1:35 p.m. PST in rainy conditions that had affected the San Francisco Bay Area for days before the contest. The Lobos scored a touchdown on the game's first drive to take an early lead, but the Midshipmen scored three touchdowns to bring the score to 21–7 early in the second quarter. After the Lobos narrowed that lead to 12 points by the end of the third quarter, the Midshipmen began a long drive which took up much of the fourth quarter. The drive ended with a field goal, which gave Navy a 15-point lead with a little over two minutes remaining in the game. On the next drive from the Lobos, the Midshipmen forced a turnover on downs and ran out the clock with their last possession to win the game.

Midshipmen players Aaron Polanco and Vaughn Kelley were named the game's offensive and defensive Most Valuable Players, respectively. The win caused the Midshipmen to finish the season with a 10–2 record, their best record since the 1905 season. After the game, the Associated Press College Poll and the USA Today Coaches' Poll ranked the team as the 24th best in the nation. The loss caused the Lobos' record to fall to 7–5.

== Team selection ==
First played in 2002 when it was called the Diamond Walnut San Francisco Bowl, organizers announced a new name in May 2004 for that year's iteration of the annual game for the 2004–05 NCAA football bowl season. The new title for the game was derived from the Emerald Nuts brand owned by the game's primary sponsor, Diamond Foods. Originally, the game was to feature the sixth bowl eligible team from the Pacific-10 Conference and the third eligible team from the Mountain West Conference.

=== Navy ===
Since only two teams from the Pacific-10 Conference had become bowl eligible near the end of the 2004 NCAA Division I-A football season, organizers looked to the United States Naval Academy Midshipmen, who were not a member of any athletic conference, to fill the open spot. The team accepted their invitation to play in the Emerald Bowl on November 22, two days after defeating the Rutgers Scarlet Knights with a score of 54–21 to earn an 8–2 record. The Midshipmen had originally intended to play in the 2004 Liberty Bowl, but chose the Emerald Bowl when it looked as though Liberty Bowl organizers were seeking a matchup of more "high-powered offenses". After defeating the Army Black Knights with a score of 42–13 in that year's Army–Navy Game, the Midshipmen ended the regular season with a record of 9–2, the first time since the 1963 college football season that Navy had won nine or more games in a season. Wins over Army and the Air Force Falcons secured Navy's second consecutive Commander-in-Chief's Trophy. Navy's previous bowl game, the 2003 Houston Bowl, had ended in a 38–14 loss to the Texas Tech Red Raiders.

=== New Mexico ===
The University of New Mexico Lobos accepted the game's other invitation on December 30, 2004. The Lobos finished the regular season with five straight wins, culminating in a 16–9 win over conference rival Wyoming to finish with a record of 7–4. The game marked the first time in the program's history the team had played in three straight bowl games, having lost in the 2002 and 2003 editions of the Las Vegas Bowl to the UCLA Bruins and the Oregon State Beavers, respectively. The bowl game was the first meeting between was the two teams.

== Pre-game buildup ==
Prior to the game, spread bettors favored the New Mexico Lobos by a single point. Given both teams' propensity for running the ball and the rainy weather conditions that had affected the San Francisco area for days prior to the game, analysts expected that it would center around both teams' rushing offenses. The Baltimore Sun sports writer Kent Baker predicted that "the teams' non-reliance on the pass will serve both well. The game should be fairly low scoring and rapidly played, with the Midshipmen eking out a victory."

=== Navy ===
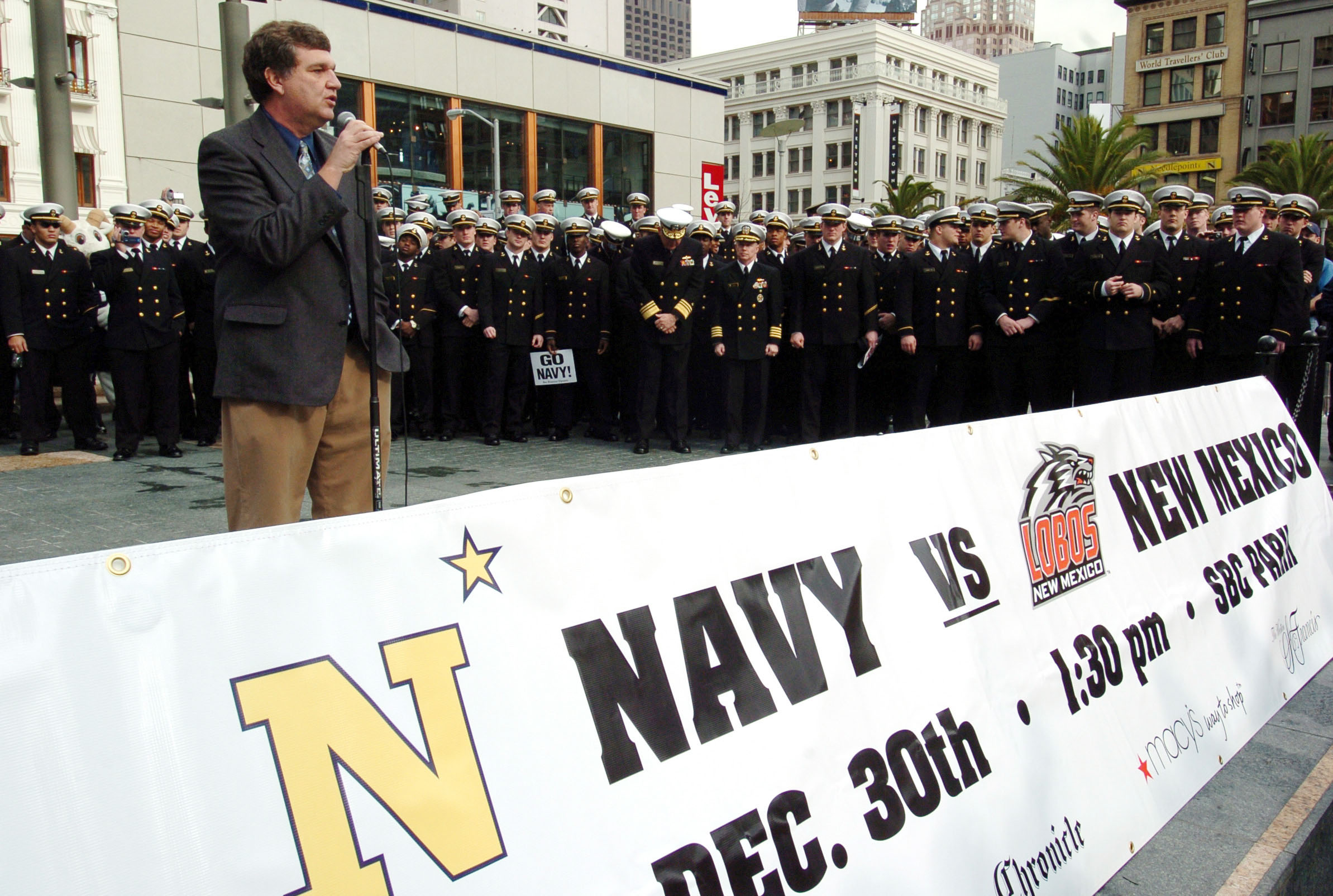
Midshipmen head coach Paul Johnson speaks at a pep rally in San Francisco on the day before the game.

The Midshipmen triple option rushing offense, including future National Football League (NFL) fullback Kyle Eckel, ranked third among FBS teams in total rushing yards and averaged 291 rushing yards per game. The Midshipmen passing offense, however, ranked 116th out of 117 FBS teams. Using a 3–4 defensive scheme, the Midshipmen had experienced mixed levels of defensive success. Although the defensive backs had set a team record for interceptions returned for touchdowns during the season, analysts and fans criticized the squad for a 42–10 loss to the Tulane Green Wave. Special teams play was a noted weakness for Navy; kicker Geoff Blumenfeld had missed seven of ten field goal attempts during the season, including three at distances shorter than 30 yards. The Midshipmen, who had recently completed rigorous midterm exams, were also mourning the death of former teammate J. P. Blecksmith, who had been killed at the Second Battle of Fallujah in the Iraq war in November.

=== New Mexico ===
The Lobos also relied heavily on their rushing offense. Running back DonTrell Moore had gained 3,667 career yards and averaged 106 rushing yards per game coming into the contest. When both Moore and quarterback Kole McKamey played for the Lobos, the team had a record of 6–1, averaging 21.4 offensive points per game; however, when either player was sidelined with an injury, the team's record dropped to 1–3 and the offense averaged 10.3 points per game. The Lobos' passing offense also ranked near the bottom of the FBS, at 115th. Wide receiver Hank Baskett led the team with 49 receptions for 793 yards during the season. The Lobos entered the bowl game with the eighth best rushing defense in the country, allowing an average of 93.6 rushing yards per game. The team had allowed 107 yards of rushing offense in its previous four games combined; it ranked first in the Mountain West Conference in fewest points allowed and most sacks, and had not allowed a rushing touchdown in its last five games. With a win, Lobos head coach Rocky Long would set a team record for most wins as a head coach.

== Game summary ==
The 2004 Emerald Bowl began with a 1:35 p.m. PST kickoff time in SBC Park. Because the field had been converted from the baseball diamond typically used by the San Francisco Giants, both teams shared the same sideline during the game. Rainy conditions caused the field's natural grass surface to become muddier as the game progressed. Although 30,563 tickets were sold, an increase of 19 percent from the 2003 game, official in-stadium attendance was listed at 28,856, an increase of 28 percent over the previous year. Despite New Mexico's closer proximity to the bowl site, Midshipmen fans comprised a large portion of the crowd; Navy directly sold 18,000 tickets prior to the game and was given credit for 22,000. The game aired live on ESPN2, with Eric Collins and Andre Ware serving as announcers. With a Nielsen rating of 2.04, the game was watched by over four million households, approximately 65 percent more viewers than the previous year.

=== First quarter ===
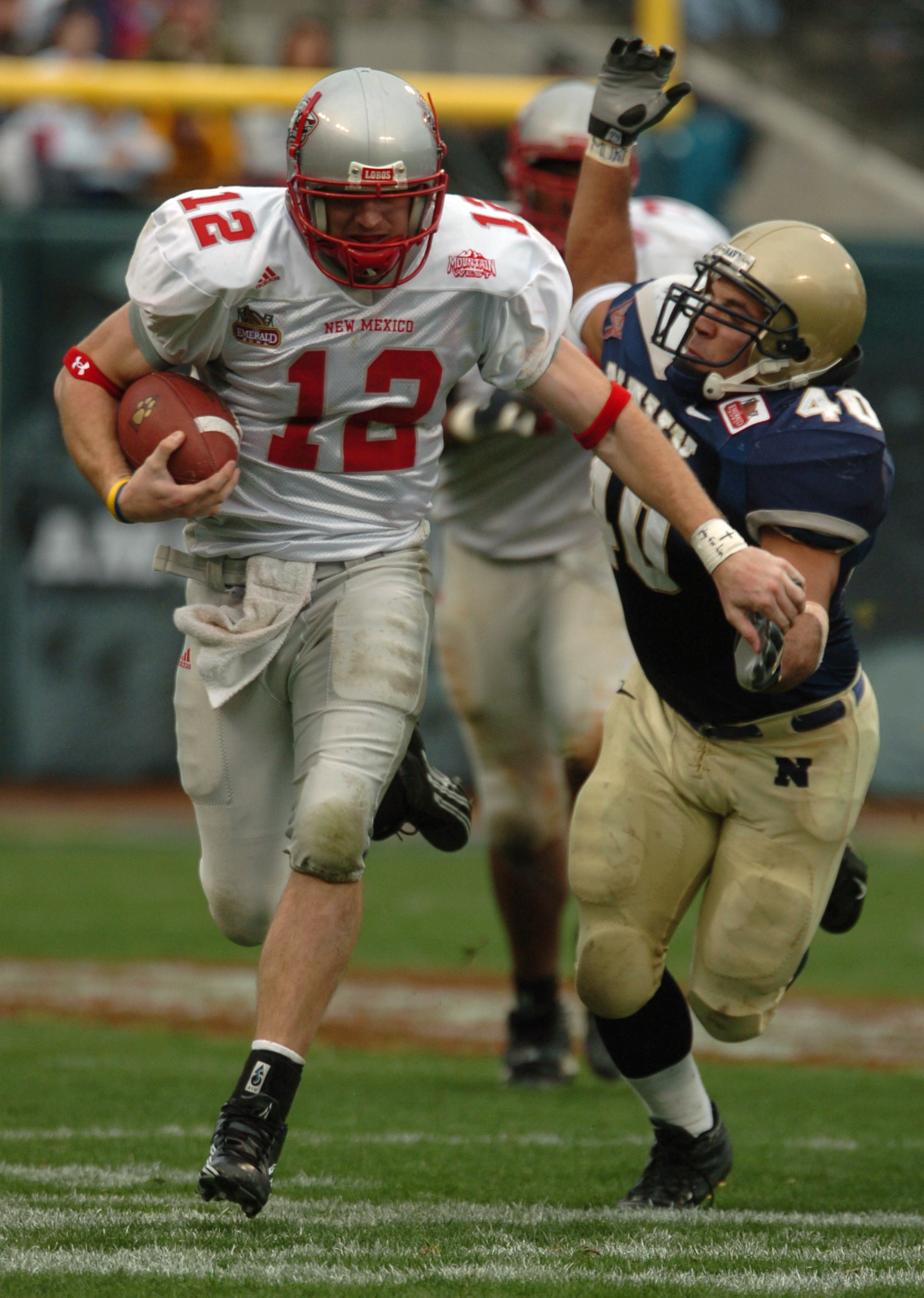
Lobos quarterback Kole McKamey avoids a tackle in the first quarter.

The Midshipmen kicked off to the Lobos to begin the game. New Mexico then executed a 66-yard drive that comprised nearly seven minutes of game time, which ended when quarterback Kole McKamey threw a 9-yard touchdown pass to Logan Hall. Midshipmen quarterback Aaron Polanco responded on the next drive by scoring a 14-yard rushing touchdown, tying the score at 7–7. On the following drive from the Lobos, running back DonTrell Moore tore his anterior cruciate ligament (ACL) when Midshipmen cornerback Vaughn Kelley made a low tackle. Moore fumbled the ball as he was tackled, and did not return for the remainder of the game. Midshipmen linebacker Lane Jackson recovered the fumble. On the Midshipmen's next drive, running back Frank Divis executed a halfback option pass trick play to Polanco for 17 yards, the team's biggest gain of the first quarter. Two plays later, Polanco scored another touchdown on a 1-yard run up the middle, giving Navy a 14–7 lead at the end of the first quarter.

=== Second quarter ===
The Midshipmen began the second quarter with a two-play, 30-second drive that ended with a 61-yard touchdown pass from Polanco to receiver Corey Dryden, increasing the team's lead to 21–7. The Lobos responded with a rushing touchdown from running back Rodney Ferguson, but kicker Wes Zunker's extra point attempt was no good, making the score 21–13. Midshipmen kicker Geoff Blumenfeld added a 27-yard field goal to bring the score to 24–13. McKamey scored another rushing touchdown to cap off another long drive, this time taking up over five minutes of game time, but the team's two-point conversion attempt failed. Lane Jackson intercepted McKamey's pass on the Lobos final drive before half-time, ending the first half of the game with a score of 24–19 in favor of the Midshipmen.

=== Third quarter ===
The Lobos began the second half of the game with a kickoff to Navy, and after an unsuccessful drive from each team, the Midshipmen began a drive on their own 25-yard line with 11:30 left in the quarter. With 7:01 left, Polanco scored another rushing touchdown for the Midshipmen, this time for 28 yards. The next Lobos drive began with two penalties from the Midshipmen, moving New Mexico from its own 31-yard line to Navy's 49 before their first snap. The Lobos moved 48 yards over the course of eight plays and almost five minutes of game time, but the team committed a turnover on downs inches away from the goal line when running back D.D. Cox was forced out of bounds on fourth down, preventing the team from scoring any points. Getting the ball back with a 31–19 lead, Navy began their next drive on their own 1-yard line with 1:41 remaining in the third quarter. Polanco rushed for three more plays before the end of the quarter.

=== Fourth quarter ===
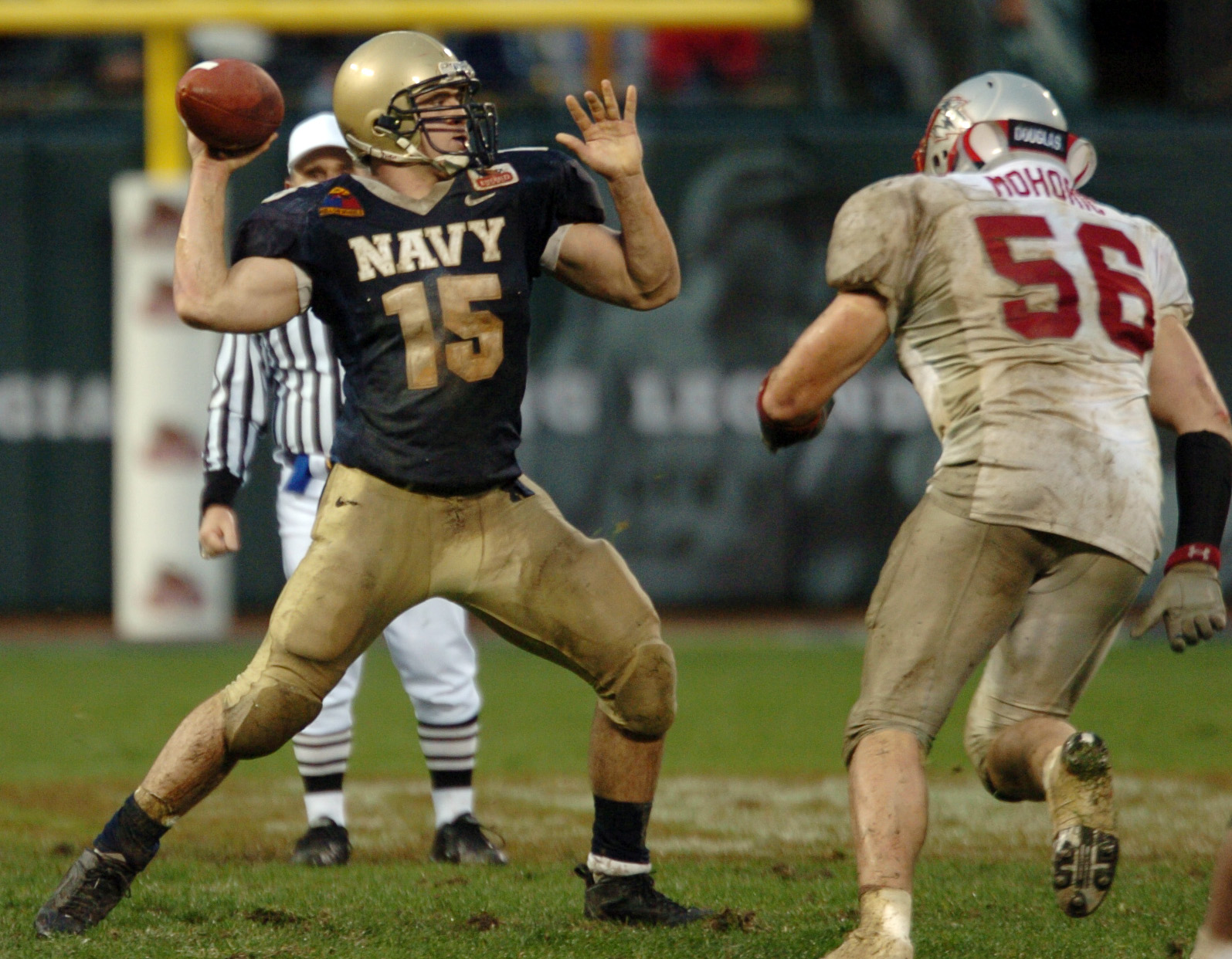
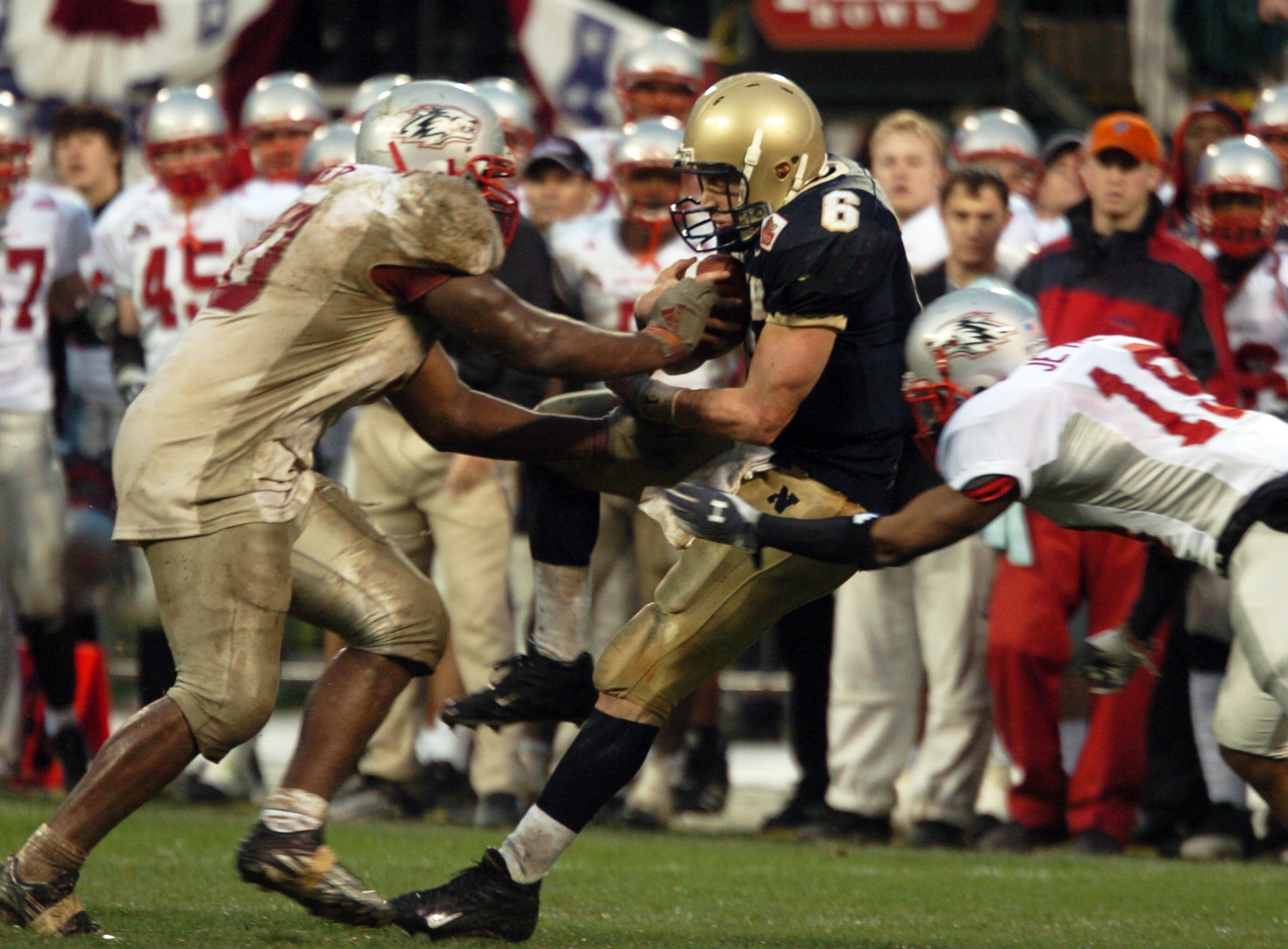
Midshipmen running back Frank Divis (left) throws his second successful halfback option pass to quarterback Aaron Polanco (right) to keep the longest drive alive.

Continuing Navy's drive from the previous quarter, Polanco and Eckel continued to run up the middle and the right side of New Mexico's defense for small gains. Polanco attempted two passes, the first of which was incomplete and the second to slotback Marco Nelson for a first down at the Midshipmen 44-yard line. After 12 plays and over six minutes of game time, the drive reached midfield. After six more rushing plays from Polanco, Eckel, and slotback Eric Roberts, the team reached the Lobos' 28-yard line. Needing three yards to achieve a fourth down conversion, Navy coach Paul Johnson called a time-out. On the next play, Frank Divis threw his second halfback option pass of the day to Polanco, gaining six yards to keep the drive alive. Eckel, Divis, and Roberts rushed for six more plays before the drive came to a halt at the Lobos' 5-yard line. On the final play of the drive, Midshipman kicker Geoff Blumenfeld kicked a 22-yard field goal to make the score 34–19 with 2:07 left in the game.

The Lobos gained three more first downs on their final drive, but were unable to score again before turning the ball over on downs. The Midshipmen ran one more quarterback kneel play to run out the clock, winning the game with a final score of 34–19.

=== Scoring summary ===
Scoring summary

Quarter	Time	Drive			Team	Scoring information	Score	
Quarter	Time	Plays	Yards	TOP	Team	Scoring information	New Mexico	Navy
1	07:31	13	66	6:53	New Mexico	Logan Hall 9-yard touchdown reception from Kole McKamey, Wes Zunker kick good	7	0
1	05:01	7	80	2:01	Navy	Aaron Polanco 14-yard touchdown run, Geoff Blumenfeld kick good	7	7
1	02:01	5	22	1:30	Navy	Aaron Polanco 1-yard touchdown run, Geoff Blumenfeld kick good	7	14
2	14:52	2	72	:30	Navy	Corey Dryden 1-yard touchdown reception from Aaron Polanco, Geoff Blumenfeld kick good	7	21
2	13:13	6	88	1:21	New Mexico	Rodney Ferguson 4-yard touchdown run, Wes Zunker kick no good	13	21
2	09:19	8	65	3:45	Navy	27-yard field goal by Geoff Blumenfeld	13	24
2	03:36	13	80	5:16	New Mexico	Kole McKamey 4-yard touchdown run, 2-point pass failed	19	24
3	07:01	9	75	4:00	Navy	Aaron Polanco 27-yard touchdown run, Geoff Blumenfeld kick good	19	31
4	02:15	26	94	14:42	Navy	22-yard field goal by Geoff Blumenfeld	19	34
"TOP" = time of possession. For other American football terms, see Glossary of American football.							19	34

== Final statistics ==
Drive chart showing the progress of each of the 26 plays comprising the record-setting drive from the Midshipmen

Statistical comparison
	UNM	Navy
1st downs	23	22
Total yards	419	393
Passing yards	207	124
Rushing yards	212	269
3rd down conversions	8–11	8–14
4th down conversions	0–2	2–2
Turnovers	3	0
Time of possession	27:39	32:21

Though the Lobos gained more first downs and yards on offense than the Midshipmen, their three turnovers and Navy's extended drive in the third and fourth quarters led to the lopsided final score. The 14-minute, 26-second final drive from the Midshipmen, measured by its 26 total plays, set a record for the longest drive in a game. Prior to the contest, the NCAA had not kept a record for longest drive, but began keeping track for the 2005 edition of the record book. No drive in either college football or in the NFL has exceeded the record in terms of total plays or in time of possession since the game was played. At post-game press conferences, both coaches discussed the characteristics of the drive:

I think that you have to give the defense on the other side some credit because they kept us out of the end zone and we had 26 plays. It wasn't a lot of big plays, it was four yards, five yards. Running the clock was kinda just what the doctor ordered at that point in the game.

— Midshipmen Head Coach Paul Johnson, Post-game press conference

I've never seen a drive like that ... In fact it wasn't even as if we were playing bad defense. I think their average gain was 3.6 yards; we just couldn't make them punt.

— Lobos Head Coach Rocky Long, Post-game press conference

Midshipmen quarterback Aaron Polanco was named as the offensive Most Valuable Player (MVP) of the game, finishing the contest with 101 passing yards and 136 rushing yards, a new team bowl record for the Midshipmen. Polanco also had two receptions for 23 yards, achieving the rare feat of leading his team in rushing yards, passing yards, and receptions. Polanco finished the season with 16 touchdowns, more than any other quarterback in the nation. Additionally, Midshipmen fullback Kyle Eckel ran for 85 yards on 24 carries, becoming the Midshipmen's fourth-leading rusher of all time. Navy cornerback Vaughn Kelley had nine tackles in the game, including the forced fumble in the first quarter, and was named as the defensive MVP of the game. Navy kicker Geoff Blumenfeld exceeded analysts' expectations by making all three of his field goal attempts during the game, and New Mexico kicker Wes Zunker missed his first extra point attempt after 46 consecutive conversions, one away from the school record.

== Game images ==
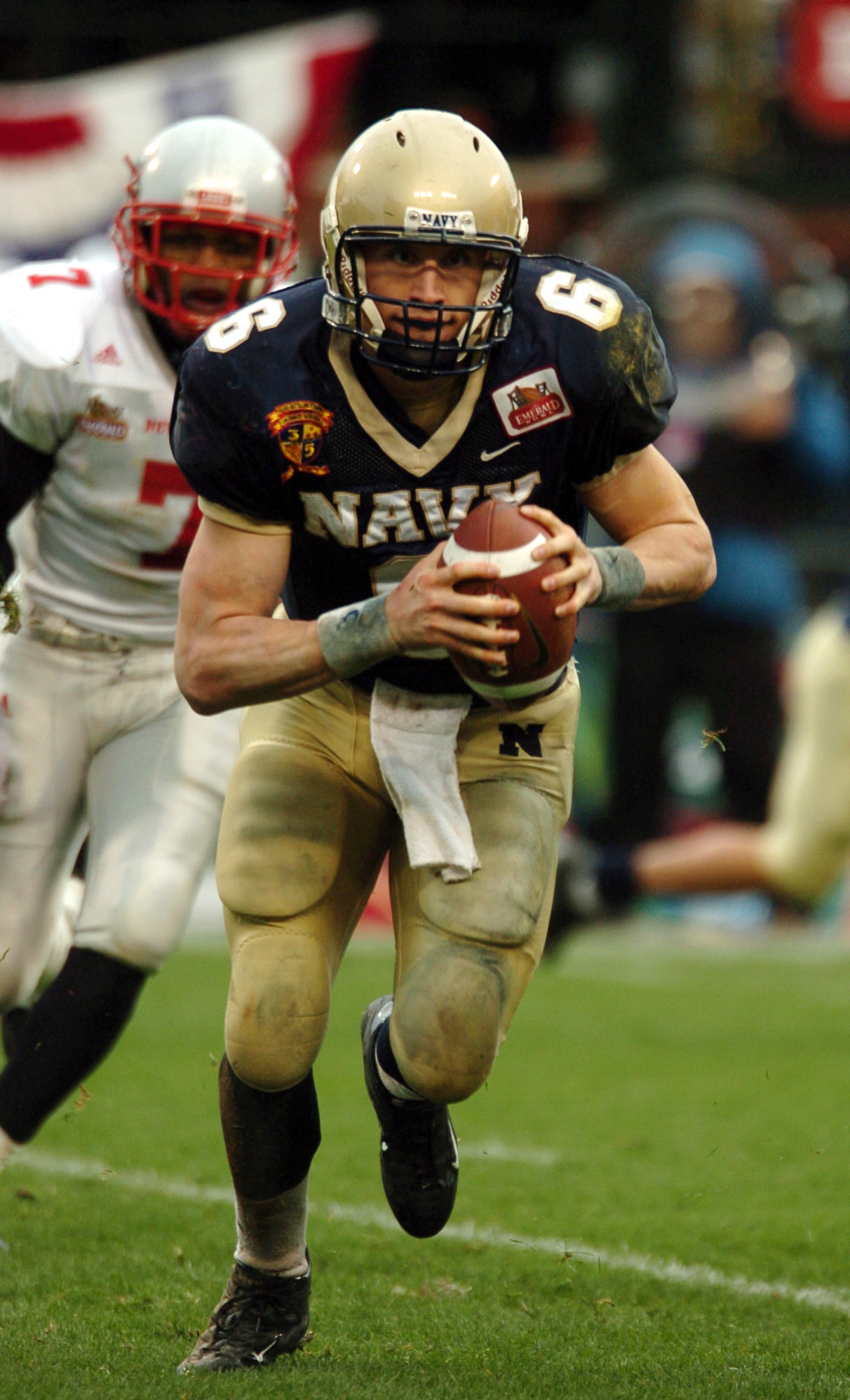
Aaron Polanco runs for a touchdown in the 1st quarter

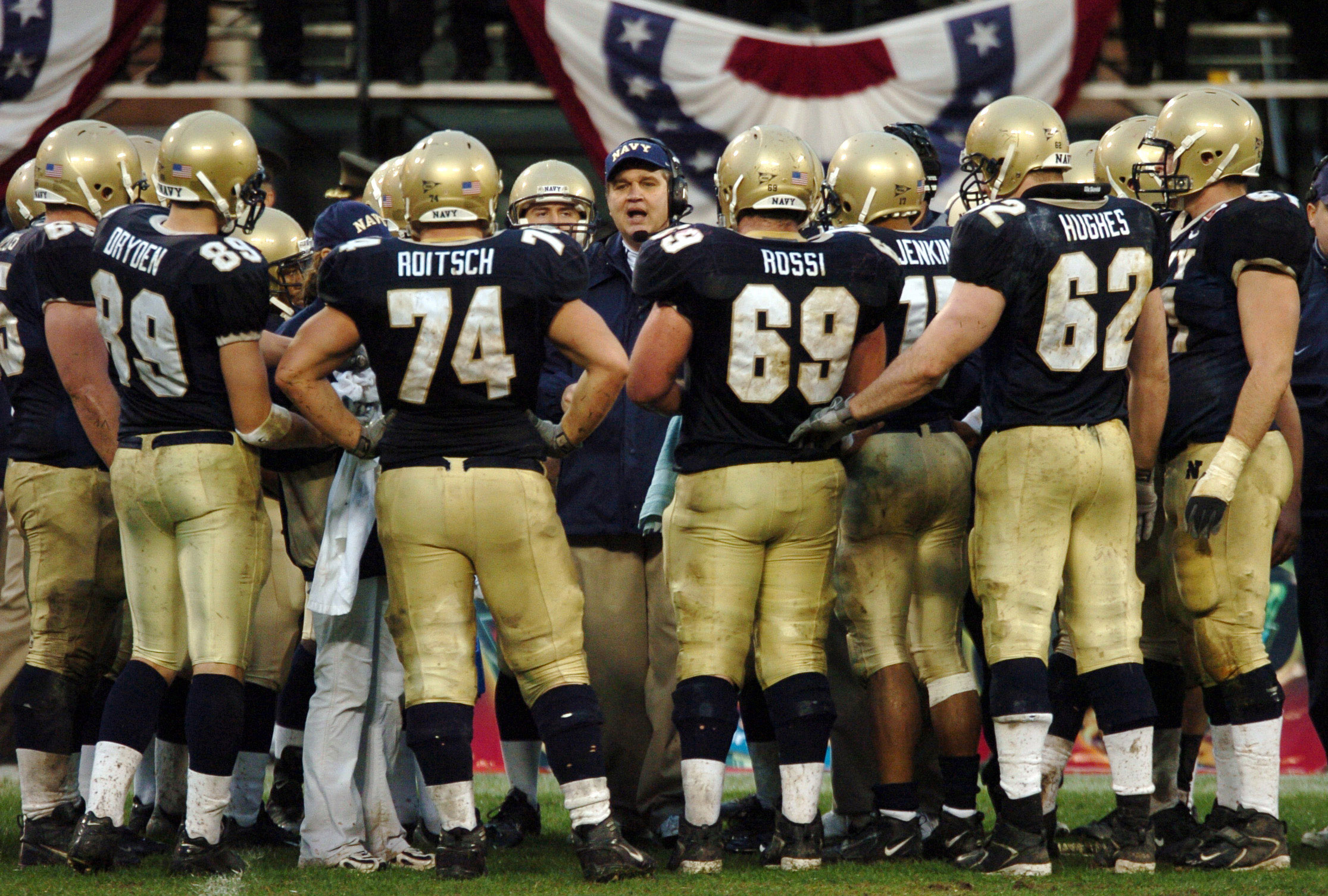
Midshipmen in huddle during 3rd quarter timeout

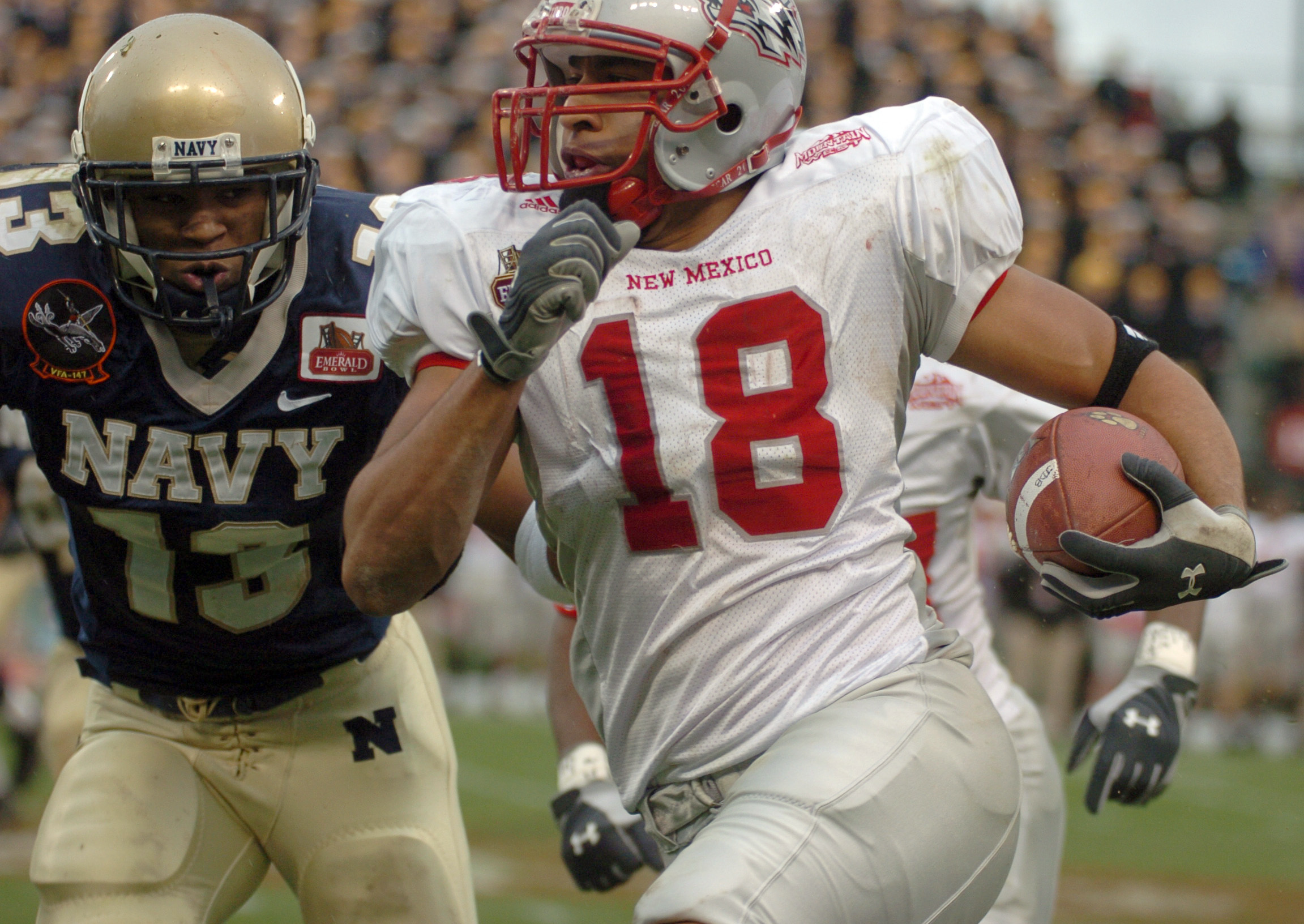
Midshipman safety Hunter Reddick and Lobos wide receiver Hank Baskett

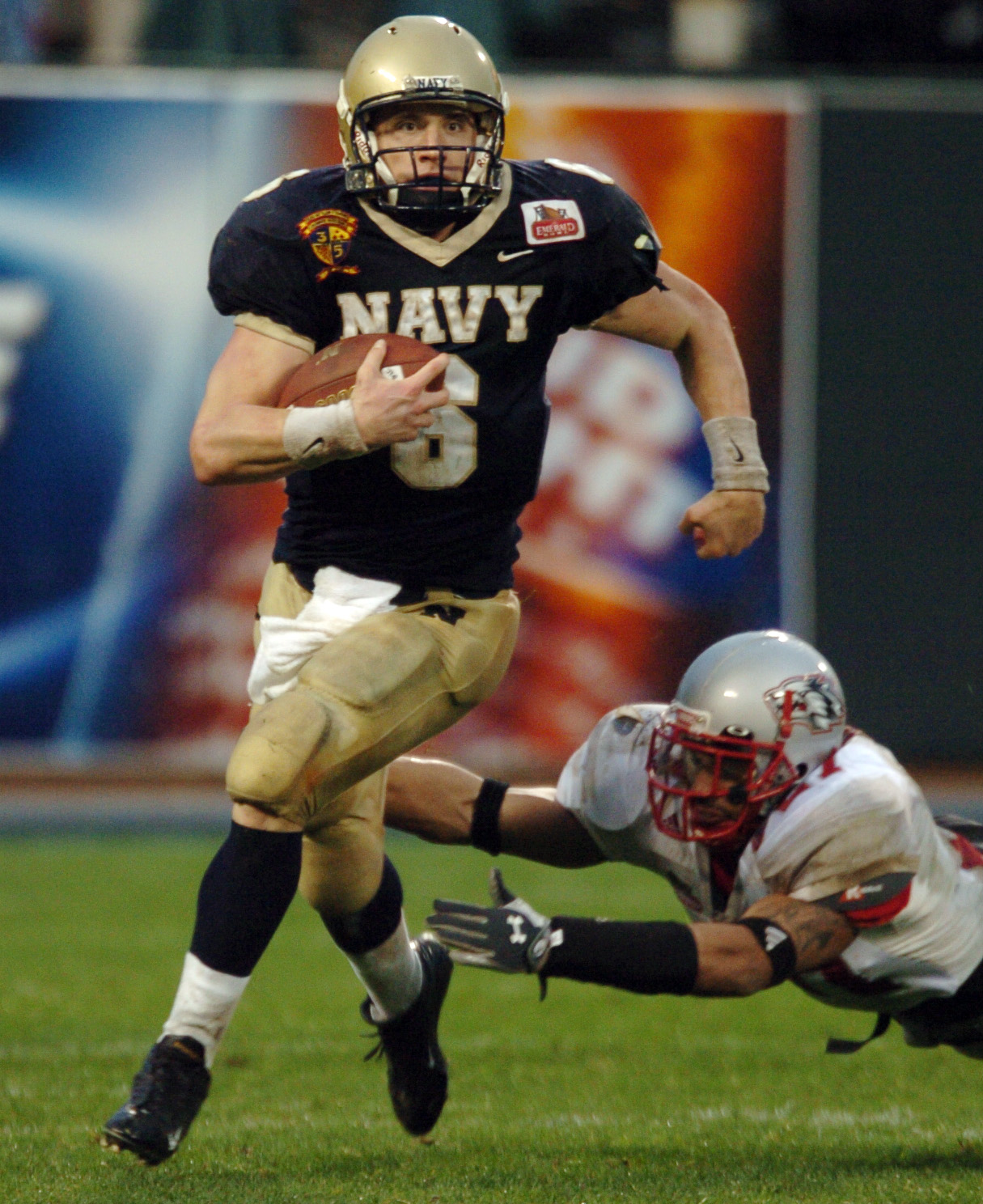
Aaron Polanco runs for yardage in the 3rd quarter of play

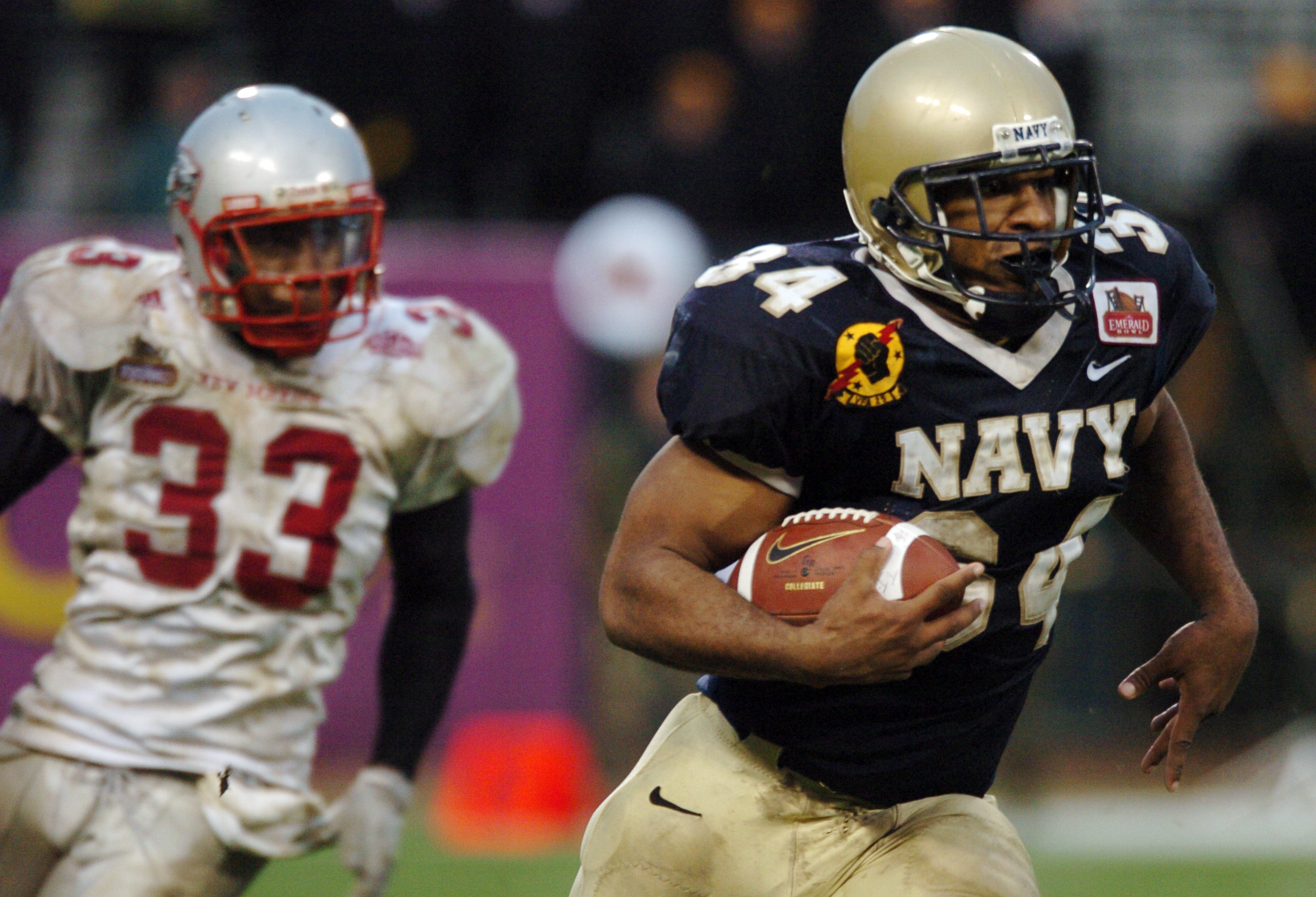
Midshipmen slot back Eric Roberts and Lobos linebacker Fola Fashola, 4th quarter

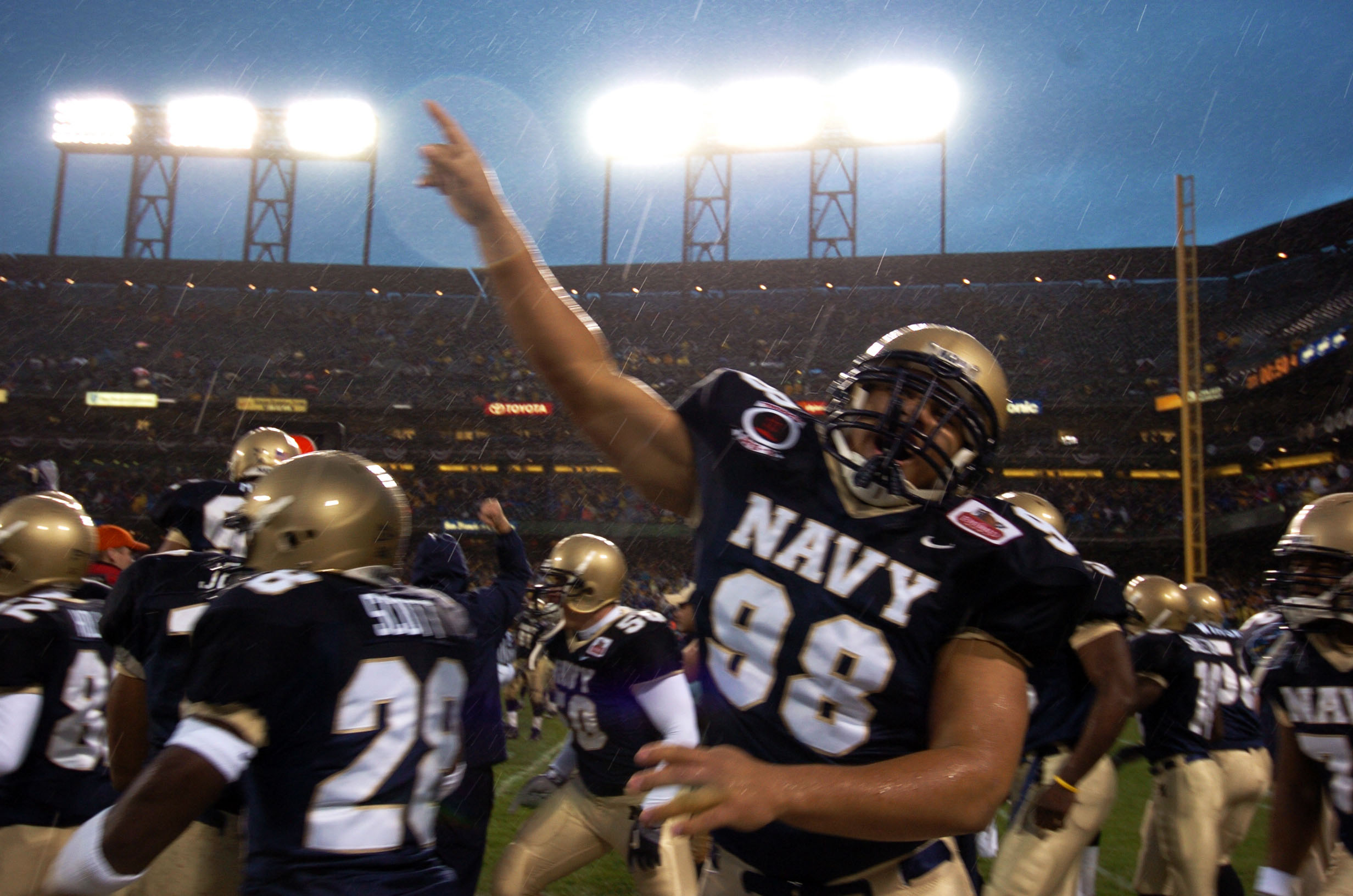
Navy celebrates after winning the game

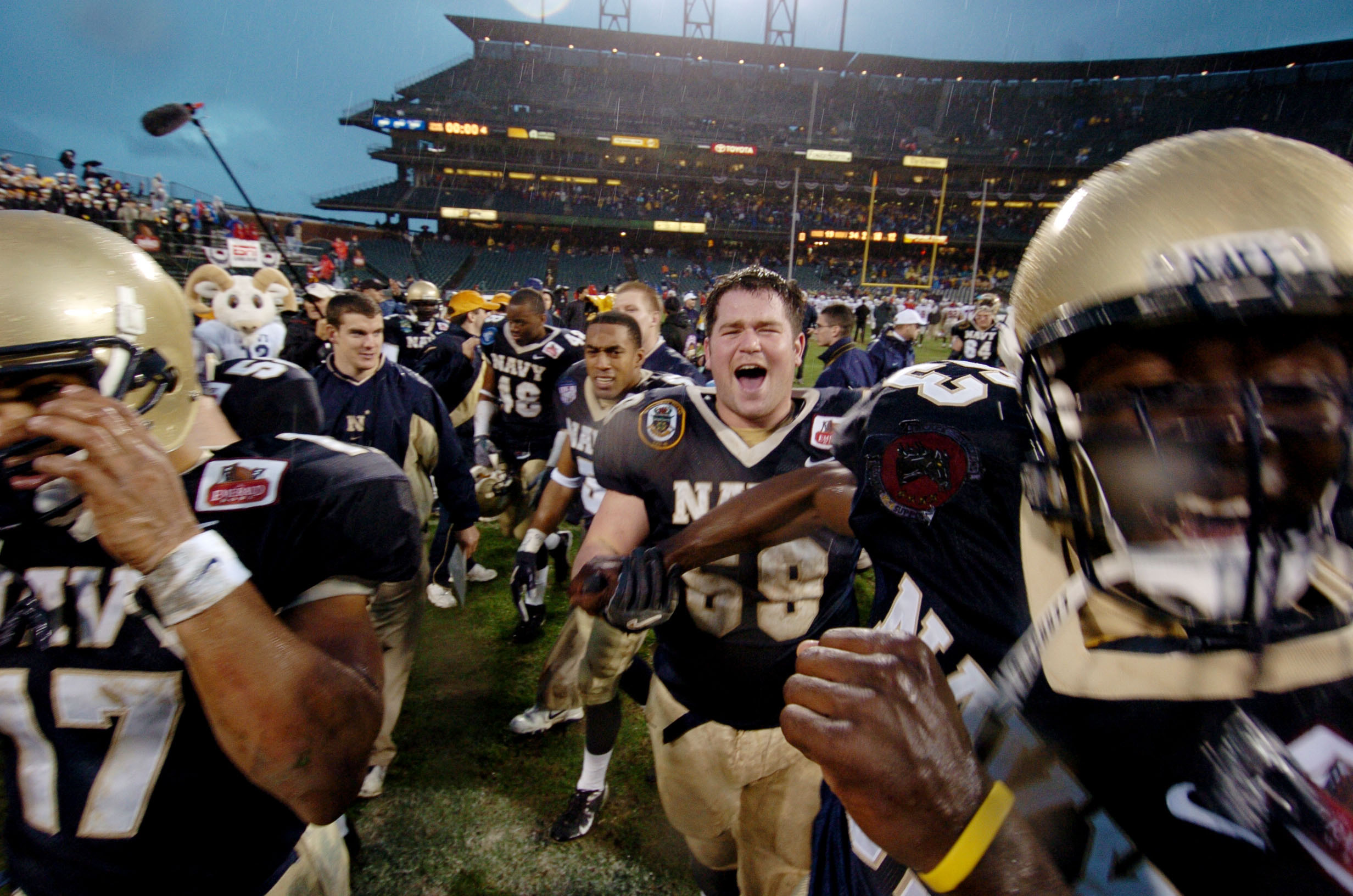
Postgame celebrations

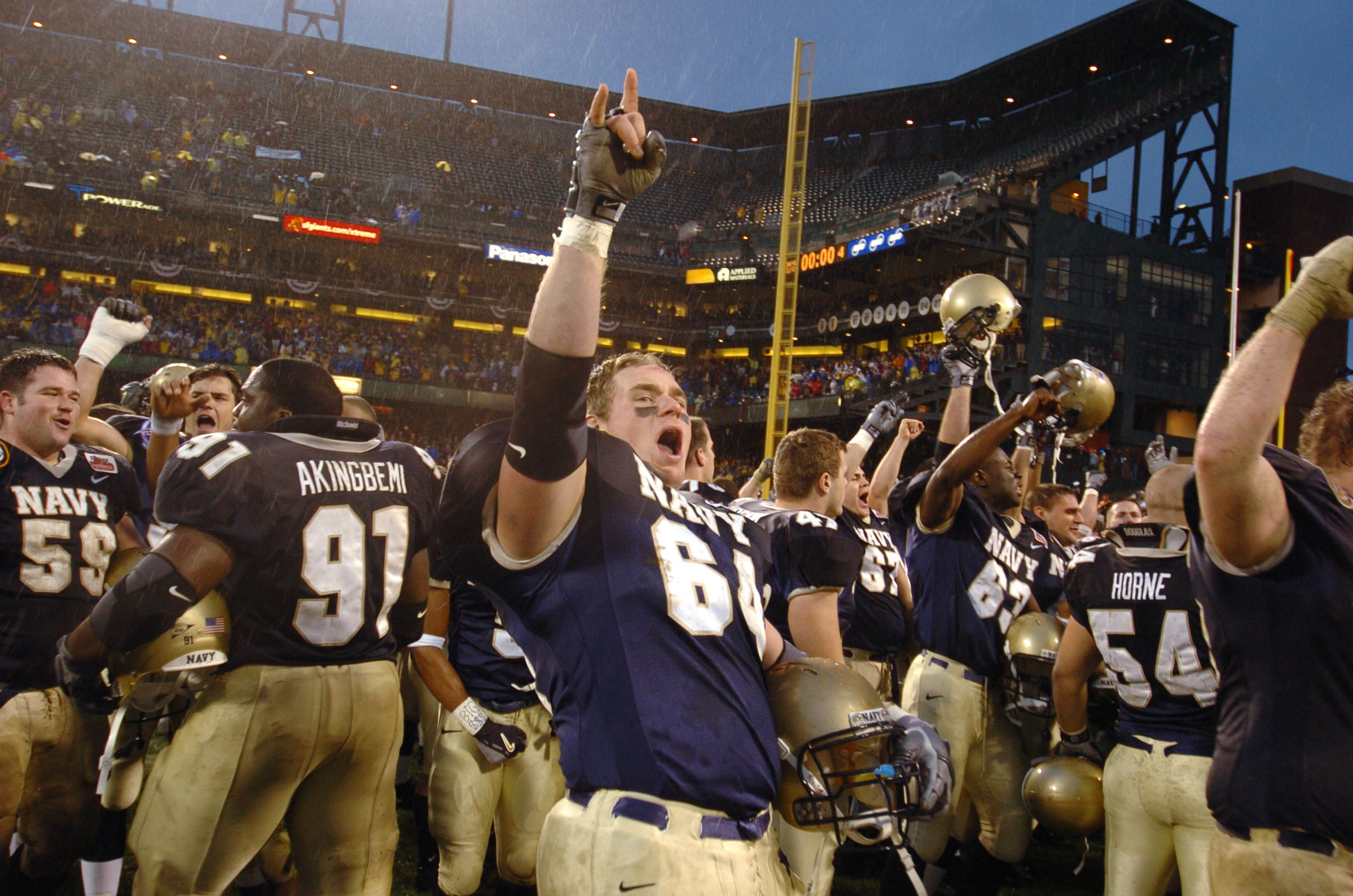
Navy postgame celebrations

== Post-game effects ==
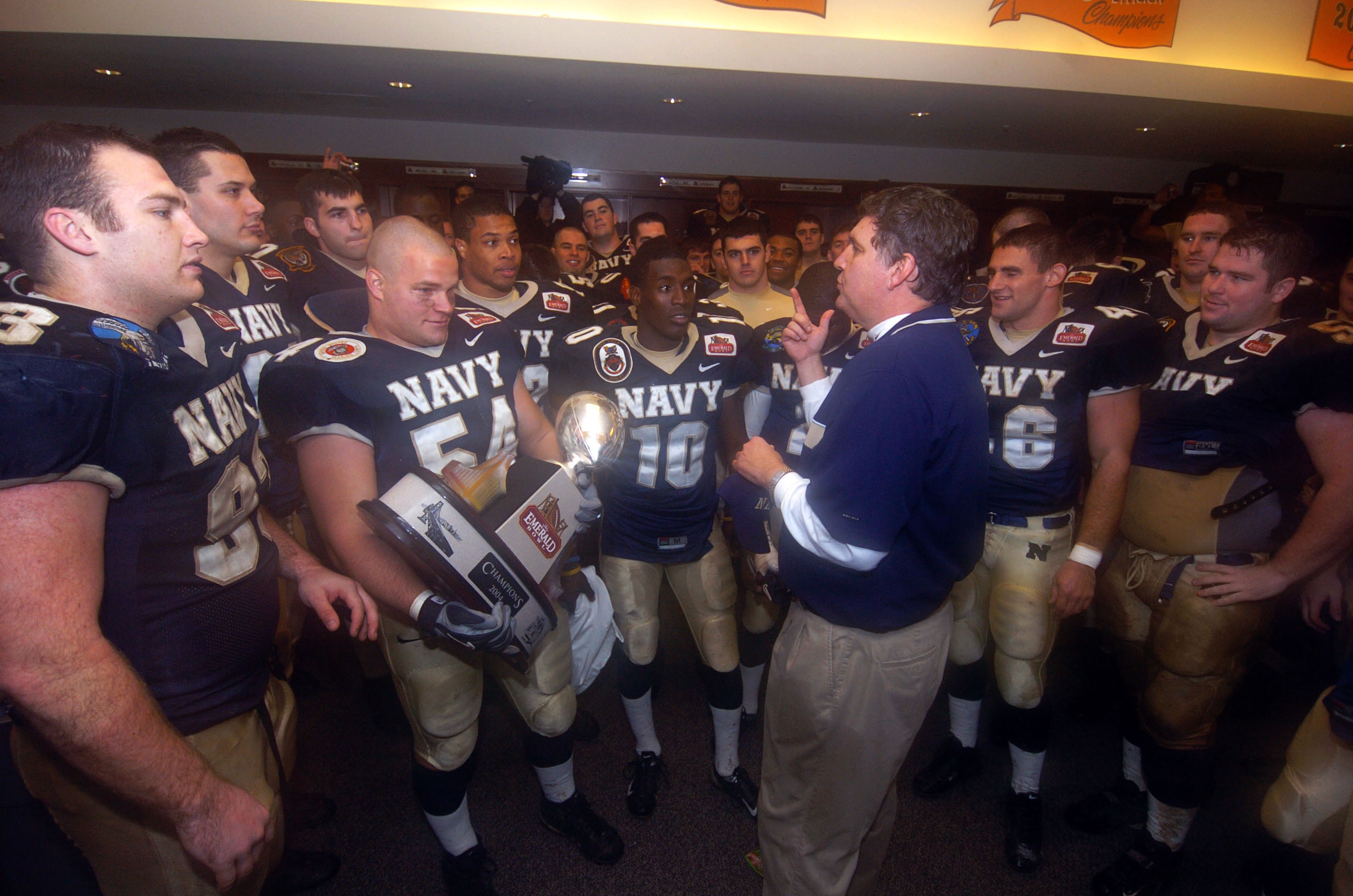
Coach Johnson and his team celebrate the victory.

The win lifted the Midshipmen's record for that season to 10–2, Navy's second 10-win season in its history and first in 99 years. It was the first bowl game victory for the Midshipmen since the 1996 Aloha Bowl. As a result of the win, the team finished the season ranked 24th in both the Associated Press and USA Today Coaches' Poll, the first time since 1978 that the Midshipmen finished the season ranked in any major poll.
