= 2004 BYU Cougars football team =

American college football season

2004 BYU Cougars football
- Conference: Mountain West
- Record: 5–6 (4–3 MW)
- Head coach: Gary Crowton (4th season)
- Offensive coordinator: Todd Bradford (2nd season)
- Offensive scheme: Spread
- Defensive coordinator: Bronco Mendenhall (2nd season)
- Base defense: 3–3–5
- Home stadium: LaVell Edwards Stadium

2004 Mountain West Conference football standings
	Conf.			Overall
Team	W		L	W		L
No. 4 Utah $	7	–	0	12	–	0
New Mexico	5	–	2	7	–	5
BYU	4	–	3	5	–	6
Wyoming	3	–	4	7	–	5
Air Force	3	–	4	5	–	6
Colorado State	3	–	4	4	–	7
San Diego State	2	–	5	4	–	7
UNLV	1	–	6	2	–	9
$ – Conference champion and BCS representative as top non-AQ school to meet automatic qualification criteria; Rankings from AP Poll

The 2004 BYU Cougars football team represented Brigham Young University during the 2004 NCAA Division I-A football season.

== Schedule ==
Date	Time	Opponent	Site	TV	Result	Attendance
September 4	7:15 pm	Notre Dame*	LaVell Edwards Stadium; Provo, UT	ESPN	W 20–17	65,251
September 11	8:00 pm	at Stanford*	Stanford Stadium; Stanford, CA	CSTV	L 10–37	31,500
September 18	8:00 pm	No. 1 USC*	LaVell Edwards Stadium; Provo, UT	ESPN	L 10–42	63,467
September 24	8:00 pm	at No. 21 Boise State*	Bronco Stadium; Boise, ID	ESPN	L 27–28	30,601
October 2	8:00 pm	at Colorado State	Hughes Stadium; Fort Collins, CO	SWP/FSRM	W 31–21	32,511
October 8	8:00 pm	UNLV	LaVell Edwards Stadium; Provo, UT	ESPN2	L 20–24	56,341
October 16	8:00 pm	Wyoming	LaVell Edwards Stadium; Provo, UT	SWP	W 24–13	58,737
October 23	1:00 pm	at Air Force	Falcon Stadium; Colorado Springs, CO	ESPN+	W 41–24	38,235
November 6	1:00 pm	San Diego State	LaVell Edwards Stadium; Provo, UT	ESPN+	W 49–16	53,435
November 13	10:00 am	New Mexico	LaVell Edwards Stadium; Provo, UT	SWP	L 14–21	53,618
November 20	5:00 pm	at No. 5 Utah	Rice-Eccles Stadium; Salt Lake City, UT (Holy War)	ESPN2	L 21–52	45,326
*Non-conference game; Rankings from AP Poll released prior to the game

•SportsWest Productions (SWP) games were shown locally on KSL 5.

== BYU Cougars Radio Network ==
The BYU Cougars radio network carried every game on radio using the broadcast trio of Greg Wrubell (pxp), Marc Lyons (analyst), and Bill Riley or Andy Boyce (sidelines). KSL 1160 AM served as the flagship station for BYU Football.

== Game summaries ==
=== Notre Dame ===
Team	1	2	3	4	Total
Notre Dame	0	3	7	7	17
• BYU	10	3	7	0	20

- Date: September 4
- Location: LaVell Edwards Stadium, Provo, UT
- Game start: 7:32 p.m. MST
- Elapsed time: 3:29
- Game attendance: 65,251
- Game weather: Partly Cloudy, 53 °F (12 °C), wind SW 8 mph (13 km/h)
- Referee: Steve Newman
- TV announcers (ESPN/Westwood One): Dave Barnett, Bill Curry, David Norrie, Alex Flanagan (ESPN)
  Tony Roberts, Allen Pinkett (Westwood One)

Scoring summary
1	9:47	BYU	Naufahu Tahi 5-yard run (Matt Payne kick)	BYU 7-0
1	1:31	BYU	Matt Payne 44-yard field goal	BYU 10-0
2	1:34	BYU	Matt Payne 53-yard field goal	BYU 13-0
2	0:00	UND	D.J. Fitzptrick 21-yard field goal	BYU 13-3
3	7:47	BYU	Austin Collie 42-yard pass from Matt Berry (Matt Payne kick)	BYU 20-3
3	4:24	UND	Rhema McKnight 54-yard pass from Brady Quinn (D.J. Fitzpatrick kick)	BYU 20-10
4	8:19	UND	Preston Jackson 38-yard interception return (D.J. Fitzpatrick kick)	BYU 20-17

=== Stanford ===
Team	1	2	3	4	Total
BYU	10	0	0	0	10
• Stanford	7	10	7	13	37

- Date: September 11
- Location: Stanford Stadium, Palo Alto, CA
- Game start: 7:06 p.m. PST
- Elapsed time: 3:35
- Game attendance: 31,500
- Game weather: Hot and clear, 85 °F (29 °C), wind light
- Referee: Jay Stricherz
- TV announcers (CSTV): Tom McCarthy, Tony McGee, Jenny Cavnar

Scoring summary
1	7:52	BYU	Naufahu Tahi 3-yard run (Matt Payne kick)	BYU 7-0
1	2:20	BYU	Matt Payne 40-yard field goal	BYU 10-0
1	2:08	STAN	T.J. Rushing 99-yard kickoff return (Michael Sgori kick)	BYU 10-7
2	11:17	STAN	Alex Smith 1-yard pass from Trent Edwards (Michael Sgori kick)	STAN 14-10
2	0:00	STAN	Michael Sgori 19-yard field goal	STAN 17-10
3	5:42	STAN	Justin McCullum 21-yard pass from Trent Edwards (Michael Sgori kick)	STAN 24-10
4	14:21	STAN	Evan Moore 24-yard pass from Trent Edwards (Michael Sgori kick)	STAN 31-10
4	11:46	STAN	Michael Sgori 29-yard field goal	STAN 34-10
4	9:51	STAN	Michael Sgori 41-yard field goal	BYU 37-10

=== USC ===
Team	1	2	3	4	Total
• #1/1 USC	0	21	0	21	42
BYU	0	3	7	0	10

- Date: September 18
- Location: LaVell Edwards Stadium, Provo, UT
- Game start: 8:19 p.m. MST
- Elapsed time: 3:20
- Game attendance: 65,251
- Game weather: Partly Cloudy, 77 °F (25 °C), wind SW 5 mph (8.0 km/h)
- Referee: Gerald Wright
- TV announcers (ESPN/Westwood One): Ron Franklin, Mike Gottfried, Erin Andrews (ESPN)
  John Castleberry, Foge Fazio (Westwood One)

Scoring summary
2	10:30	BYU	Matt Payne 46-yard field goal	BYU 3-0
2	8:30	USC	Reggie Bush 21-yard pass from Matt Leinart (Ryan Killeen kick)	USC 7-3
2	2:03	USC	Reggie Bush 66-yard run (Ryan Killeen kick)	USC 14-3
2	1:05	USC	Dwayne Jarrett 15-yard from Matt Leinart (Ryan Killeen kick)	USU 21-3
3	11:16	BYU	Todd Watkins 69-yard pass from John Beck (Matt Payne kick)	USC 21-10
4	14:16	USC	Matt Leinart 1-yard run (Ryan Killeen kick)	USC 28-10
4	10:22	USC	Lendale White 43-yard run (Ryan Killeen kick)	USC 35-10
4	2:30	USC	Lee Webb 9-yard run (Ryan Killeen kick)	USC 42-10

=== Boise State ===
Team	1	2	3	4	Total
BYU	7	6	14	0	27
• #21/21 Boise State	16	0	6	6	28

- Date: September 24
- Location: Bronco Stadium, Boise, ID
- Game start: 8:07 p.m. MST
- Elapsed time: 3:48
- Game attendance: 30,601
- Game weather: Clear, 78 °F (26 °C), wind NW 6 mph (9.7 km/h)
- Referee: Rich Kollen
- TV announcers (ESPN): Rod Gilmore, Brad Sheldon, Tim Ryan, Heather Cox

Scoring summary
1	10:57	BSU	Andy Avalos safety	BSU 2-0
1	9:17	BSU	T.J. Acree 20-yard pass from Jared Zabransky (Tyler Jones kick)	BSU 9-0
1	4:09	BSU	Antwaun Carter 5-yard run (Tyler Jones kick)	BSU 16-0
1	0:28	BYU	Curtis Brown 2-yard run (Matt Payne kick)	BSU 16-7
2	7:29	BYU	Matt Payne 32-yard field goal	BSU 16-10
2	3:28	BYU	Matt Payne 42-yard field goal	BSU 16-13
3	10:07	BSU	Tyler Jones 47-yard field goal	BSU 19-13
3	4:36	BSU	Tyler Jones 37-yard field goal	STAN 22-13
3	3:41	BYU	Todd Watkins 79-yard pass from John Beck (Matt Payne kick)	BSU 22-20
3	0:34	BYU	Austin Collie 57-yard pass from John Beck (Matt Payne kick)	BYU 27-22
4	3:42	BSU	T.J. Acree 44-yard pass from Jared Zabransky (Zabransky pass failed)	BSU 28-27

=== Colorado State ===
Team	1	2	3	4	Total
• BYU	0	10	7	14	31
Colorado State	0	7	7	7	21

- Date: October 2
- Location: Hughes Stadium, Ft. Collins, CO
- Game start: 8:10 p.m. MST
- Elapsed time: 3:40
- Game attendance: 32,511
- Game weather: Clear, 60 °F (16 °C)
- Referee: Gerald Wright
- TV announcers (SportsWest/FSRM): Tom Kirkland, Blaine Fowler (SportsWest)
  Tim Neverett, David Diaz-Infante, Keith Bleyer (FSRM)

Scoring summary
2	9:55	BYU	Matt Payne 52-yard field goal	BYU 3-0
2	1:45	BYU	Curtis Brown 14-yard run (Matt Payne kick)	BYU 10-0
2	0:59	CSU	David Anderson 6-yard pass from Justin Holland (Jeff Babcock kick)	BYU 10-7
3	11:37	CSU	Uldis Jaunarajs 3-yard run (Jeff Babcock kick)	CSU 14-10
3	2:15	BYU	Curtis Brown 5-yard run (Matt Payne kick)	BYU 17-14
4	12:51	CSU	Uldis Jaunarajs 5-yard run (Jeff Babcock kick)	CSU 21-17
4	11:48	BYU	Austin Collie 40-yard pass from John Beck (Matt Payne kick)	BYU 24-21
4	2:25	BYU	Naufahu Tahi 3-yard run (Matt Payne kick)	BYU 31-21

=== UNLV ===
Team	1	2	3	4	Total
• UNLV	0	7	14	3	24
BYU	0	10	10	0	20

- Date: October 8
- Location: LaVell Edwards Stadium, Provo, UT
- Game start: 8:07 p.m. MST
- Elapsed time: 3:51
- Game attendance: 56,341
- Referee: Scott Novak
- TV announcers (ESPN2): Dave Pasch, Rod Gilmore, Trevor Matich, Rob Stone

Scoring summary
2	8:12	BYU	Matt Payne 47-yard field goal	BYU 3-0
2	7:15	UNLV	Earvin Johnson 27-yard pass from Kurt Nantkes (Sergio Aguayo kick)	UNLV 7-3
2	0:14	BYU	Todd Watkins 7-yard pass from John Beck (Matt Payne kick)	BYU 10-7
3	13:15	UNLV	Dominique Dorsey 12-yard run (Sergio Aguayo kick)	UNLV 14-10
3	5:59	BYU	Matt Payne 50-yard field goal	UNLV 14-13
3	5:51	BYU	Cameron Jensen 26-yard interception return (Matt Payne kick)	BYU 20-14
3	1:58	UNLV	Dyante Perkins 12-yard run (Sergio Aguayo kick)	UNLV 21-20
4	3:49	UNLV	Sergio Aguayo 35-yard field goal	UNLV 24-21

=== Wyoming ===
Team	1	2	3	4	Total
Wyoming	0	6	7	0	13
• BYU	7	3	0	14	24

- Date: October 16
- Location: LaVell Edwards Stadium, Provo, UT
- Game start: 8:07 p.m. MST
- Elapsed time: 3:16
- Game attendance: 58,737
- Game weather: Clear, 68 °F (20 °C), wind SW 7 mph (11 km/h)
- Referee: Gerald Wright
- TV announcers (SportsWest): Tom Kirkland, Blaine Fowler

Scoring summary
1	10:46	BYU	Austin Collie 40-yard pass from Curtis Brown (Matt Payne kick)	BYU 7-0
2	12:01	WY	Deric Yaussi 45-yard field goal	BYU 7-3
2	4:18	BYU	Matt Payne 46-yard field goal	BYU 10-3
2	1:11	WY	Deric Yaussi 40-yard field goal	BYU 10-6
3	2:26	WY	Jovon Bouknight 35-yard pass from Corey Bramlet (Deric Yaussi kick)	WY 13-10
4	13:37	BYU	Curtis Brown 9-yard run (Matt Payne kick)	BYU 17-13
4	2:06	BYU	Naufahu Tahi 15-yard run (Matt Payne kick)	BYU 24-13

=== Air Force ===
Team	1	2	3	4	Total
• BYU	3	0	21	17	41
Air Force	0	10	0	14	24

- Date: October 23
- Location: Falcon Stadium, Colorado Springs, CO
- Game start: 1:05 p.m. MST
- Elapsed time: 3:21
- Game attendance: 38,235
- Referee: Terry Leyden
- TV announcers (ESPN+): Trey Bender, Kelly Stouffer, Anne Marie Anderson

Scoring summary
1	9:28	BYU	Matt Payne 23-yard field goal	BYU 3-0
2	12:13	AFA	Darnell Stephens 29-yard run (Michael Greenway kick)	AFA 7-3
2	10:08	AFA	Michael Greenway 48-yard field goal	AFA 10-3
3	14:27	BYU	Todd Watkins 70-yard pass from John Beck (Matt Payne kick)	TIED 10-10
3	6:29	BYU	Dennis Pitta 11-yard pass from John Beck (Matt Payne kick)	BYU 17-10
3	4:26	BYU	Gary Lovely 8-yard blocked punt return (Matt Payne kick)	BYU 24-10
4	14:55	BYU	Austin Collie 14-yard pass from John Beck (Matt Payne kick)	BYU 31-10
4	14:21	AFA	Greg Kirwood 26-yard pass from Shaun Carey (Michael Greenway kick)	BYU 31-17
4	11:09	BYU	Matt Payne 53-yard field goal	BYU 34-17
4	7:56	AFA	Darnell Stephens 7-yard run (Michael Greenway kick)	BYU 34-24
4	2:59	BYU	Dennis Pitta 1-yard pass from John Beck (Matt Payne kick)	BYU 41-24

=== San Diego State ===
Team	1	2	3	4	Total
San Diego State	0	3	0	13	16
• BYU	7	6	23	13	49

- Date: November 6
- Location: LaVell Edwards Stadium, Provo, UT
- Game start: 1:05 p.m. MST
- Elapsed time: 3:30
- Game attendance: 53,435
- Game weather: Clear, 60 °F (16 °C), wind NE 2 mph (3.2 km/h)
- Referee: Craig Battaglia
- TV announcers (ESPN+): Trey Bender, Kelly Stouffer, Anne Marie Anderson

Scoring summary
1	11:27	BYU	Todd Watkins 68-yard pass from John Beck (Matt Payne kick)	BYU 7-0
2	14:47	SDSU	Garrett Palmer 47-yard field goal	BYU 7-3
2	3:51	BYU	Matt Payne 43-yard field goal	BYU 10-3
2	0:00	BYU	Matt Payne 34-yard field goal	BYU 13-3
3	8:45	BYU	Curtis Brown 3-yard run (Matt Payne kick)	BYU 20-3
3	7:05	BYU	Austin Collie 6-yard pass from John Beck (kick blocked)	BYU 26-3
3	6:13	BYU	Naufahu Tahi 2-yard run (Matt Payne kick)	BYU 33-3
3	2:47	BYU	Matt Payne 42-yard field goal	BYU 36-3
4	14:42	BYU	Austin Collie 82-yard pass from John Beck (Matt Payne kick)	BYU 43-3
4	9:02	SDSU	Brandon Bornes 2-yard run (kick failed)	BYU 43-9
4	1:13	BYU	Eric Waterson 2-yard run (Trent Williams kick failed)	BYU 49-9
4	0:17	SDSU	Alex Thompson 10-yard pass from Kevin O'Connell (Garrett Palmer kick)	BYU 49-16

=== New Mexico ===
Team	1	2	3	4	Total
• New Mexico	14	0	0	7	21
BYU	7	0	0	7	14

- Date: November 13
- Location: LaVell Edwards Stadium, Provo, UT
- Game start: 10:07 a.m. MST
- Elapsed time: 2:58
- Game attendance: 53,618
- Game weather: Cloudy, 44 °F (7 °C), wind SW 6 mph (9.7 km/h)
- Referee: Terry Leyden
- TV announcers (SportsWest): Tom Kirkland, Blaine Fowler

Scoring summary
1	3:02	BYU	Riley Weber 12-yard pass from Matt Payne (Matt Payne kick)	BYU 7-0
1	2:23	UNM	Marcus Smith 15-yard run (Wes Zunker kick)	TIED 7-7
1	0:47	UNM	Hank Baskett 29-yard pass from Kole McCamey (Wes Zunker kick)	UNM 14-7
4	8:37	UNM	DonTrell Moore 1-yard run (Wes Zunker kick)	UNM 21-7
4	6:00	BYU	Naufahu Tahi 7-yard pass from John Beck (Matt Payne kick)	UNM 21-14

=== Utah ===
Team	1	2	3	4	Total
BYU	0	14	7	0	21
• #5/6 Utah	7	14	17	14	52

- Date: November 20
- Location: Rice-Eccles Stadium, Salt Lake City, UT
- Game start: 5:07 p.m. MST
- Elapsed time: 3:21
- Game attendance: 45,326
- Game weather: Cloudy w/ Snow Flurries, 32 °F (0 °C)
- Referee: Karl Richins
- TV announcers (ESPN2): Mike Tirico, Kirk Herbstreit, Lee Corso, Jill Arrington

Scoring summary
1	0:52	UTAH	Steve Savoy 2-yard run (David Carroll kick)	UTAH 7-0
2	12:13	BYU	Todd Watkins 12-yard pass from John Beck (Matt Payne kick)	TIED 7-7
2	9:28	UTAH	Marty Johnson 5-yard run (David Carroll kick)	UTAH 14-7
2	5:40	BYU	Curtis Brown 6-yard run (Matt Payne kick)	TIED 14-14
2	1:19	UTAH	Alex Smith 2-yard run (David Carroll kick)	UTAH 21-14
3	11:43	UTAH	David Carroll 30-yard field goal	UTAH 24-14
3	10:43	UTAH	Bo Nagahi 12-yard fumble return (David Carroll kick)	UTAH 31-14
3	8:38	BYU	Austin Collie 16-yard pass from John Beck (Matt Payne kick)	UTAH 31-21
3	5:59	UTAH	Steve Savoy 92-yard run (David Carroll kick)	UTAH 38-21
4	10:34	UTAH	Steve Savoy 20-yard pass from Alex Smith (David Carroll kick)	UTAH 45-21
4	1:03	UTAH	Steve Fifita 4-yard run (David Carroll kick)	UTAH 52-21
