= 2004 New Mexico Lobos football team =

American college football season

2004 New Mexico Lobos football
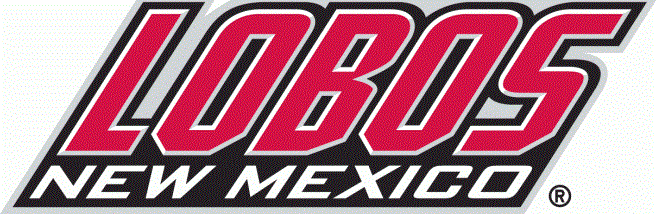

Emerald Bowl, L 19–34 vs. Navy
- Conference: Mountain West Conference
- Record: 7–5 (5–2 MW)
- Head coach: Rocky Long (7th season)
- Offensive coordinator: Dan Dodd (5th season)
- Offensive scheme: Multiple
- Defensive coordinator: Osia Lewis (2nd season)
- Base defense: 3–3–5
- Home stadium: University Stadium

2004 Mountain West Conference football standings
	Conf.			Overall
Team	W		L	W		L
No. 4 Utah $	7	–	0	12	–	0
New Mexico	5	–	2	7	–	5
BYU	4	–	3	5	–	6
Wyoming	3	–	4	7	–	5
Air Force	3	–	4	5	–	6
Colorado State	3	–	4	4	–	7
San Diego State	2	–	5	4	–	7
UNLV	1	–	6	2	–	9
$ – Conference champion and BCS representative as top non-AQ school to meet automatic qualification criteria; Rankings from AP Poll

The 2004 New Mexico Lobos football team represented the University of New Mexico as a member of the Mountain West Conference (MW) during the 2004 NCAA Division I-A football season. Led by seventh-year head coach Rocky Long, the Lobos compiled an overall record of 7–5 with a mark of 5–2 in conference play, placing second in the MW. New Mexico was invited to the Emerald Bowl where the Lobos lost to Navy. The team played home games at University Stadium in Albuquerque, New Mexico.

== Schedule ==
Date	Time	Opponent	Site	TV	Result	Attendance
September 3	6:00 pm	Washington State*	University Stadium; Albuquerque, NM	ESPN	L 17–21	34,860
September 11	6:00 pm	Texas Tech*	University Stadium; Albuquerque, NM	KRQE	W 27–24	38,746
September 18	2:00 pm	at Oregon State*	Reser Stadium; Corvallis, OR		L 7–17	35,950
September 25	6:00 pm	at New Mexico State*	Aggie Memorial Stadium; Las Cruces, NM (Rio Grande Rivalry)	SPW	W 38–3	31,214
October 1	6:00 pm	No. 14 Utah	University Stadium; Albuquerque, NM	ESPN2	L 7–28	40,182
October 9	4:30 pm	at Air Force	Falcon Stadium; Colorado Springs, CO	SPW	L 23–28	36,369
October 16	1:00 pm	at UNLV	Sam Boyd Stadium; Whitney, NV	ESPN Plus	W 24–20	19,065
October 23	4:30 pm	San Diego State^{†}	University Stadium; Albuquerque, NM	SPW	W 19–9	37,287
October 30	1:00 pm	at Colorado State	Hughes Stadium; Fort Collins, CO	ESPN Plus	W 26–17	24,573
November 13	10:00 am	at BYU	LaVell Edwards Stadium; Provo, UT	SPW	W 21–14	53,618
November 20	1:00 pm	Wyoming	University Stadium; Albuquerque, NM	ESPN Plus	W 16–9	35,333
December 30	2:30 pm	vs. Navy*	SBC Park; San Francisco, CA (Emerald Bowl)	ESPN2	L 19–34	30,563
*Non-conference game; ^{†}Homecoming; Rankings from AP Poll released prior to the game; All times are in Mountain time
