= Claude Terrell =

American football player (born 1982)

No. 75
- Position: Offensive guard

Personal information
- Born: April 20, 1982 (age 44); Texas City, Texas, U.S.
- Listed height: 6 ft 2 in (1.88 m)
- Listed weight: 330 lb (150 kg)

Career information
- High school: La Marque (La Marque, Texas)
- College: New Mexico
- NFL draft: 2005: 4th round, 134th overall pick

Career history
- St. Louis Rams (2005–2007); Duke City Gladiators (2016)

Awards and highlights
- Third-team All-American (2003); 2× First-team All-MW (2003, 2004); Second-team All-MW (2002)

Career NFL statistics
- Games played: 20
- Games started: 13
- Stats at Pro Football Reference

Claude Edward Terrell (born April 20, 1982) is an American former professional football player who was an offensive guard for the St. Louis Rams in the National Football League (NFL). He played college football for the New Mexico Lobos. Terrell was released by the Rams on October 23, 2007, after being arrested for assaulting his wife. Terrell was already on probation after a previous arrest for assault on a family member. On February 17, 2011, Terrell was accused of beating and raping a Texas City woman at gunpoint during a seven-hour ordeal.

== Early life ==
Terrell is a 2000 graduate of La Marque High School in Texas. He was a three-year letterman and a two-year starter for and an All-state and All-district selection his senior year. He was also named the team's most valuable player. He was also All-State and All-American in basketball where he was a four-year letterman and he also lettered in track.

== College career ==
Terrell attended the University of New Mexico, where he played four seasons the Lobos, while red-shirting his first year. In 2004 Terrell was arguably the Mountain West Conference's best lineman, playing the tackle for the first time. He was a First-team All-Mountain West Conference selection in 2004 for the second consecutive season. As a junior in 2003 Terrell was a First-team All-MWC selection who notched 125 knockdown blocks during the regular season and starting all 13 games at strong guard.

In 2002 as a sophomore he was a Second-team All-Mountain West Conference selection and was named Outstanding Offensive Lineman by his teammates at the UNM . He started all 14 games and played all but 7 offensive snaps on the season and was third on the team with 139 knockdown blocks. In 2001 as a redshirt freshman he started 10 of 11 games and played 757 of 848 offensive snaps.. He played the entire game 7 times and had 86 knockdown blocks tied for 3rd on the team.

== Professional career ==
=== Pre-draft ===
Pre-draft measurables
Height	Weight	Arm length	Hand span	40-yard dash	10-yard split	20-yard split	20-yard shuttle	Three-cone drill	Vertical jump	Broad jump	Bench press
6 ft 2 1/4 in (1.89 m)	343 lb (156 kg)	31 3/8 in (0.80 m)	9 1/4 in (0.23 m)	5.26 s	1.89 s	3.13 s	4.81 s	8.19 s	24.5 in (0.62 m)	7 ft 10 in (2.39 m)	27 reps
All values from NFL Combine/Pro Day

Terrell was charged in 2004 with misdemeanor assault, which possibly harmed his draft status.

=== St. Louis Rams ===
Terrell was selected in the fourth round with the 134th overall pick by the St. Louis Rams in the 2005 NFL draft. In 2005, as a rookie, he played in 14 games with 10 starts at guard. He did not play at all in 2006. He was put on injured reserve on August 28, 2006, with a wrist injury. He returned and played 6 games in 2007 with three starts. Terrell was cut by the Rams in 2007 after being charged with assaulting his then-wife.

=== Duke City Gladiators ===
On November 3, 2015, Terrell signed with the Duke City Gladiators of Champions Indoor Football (CIF).
