= 2004 Colorado State Rams football team =

American college football season

2004 Colorado State Rams football
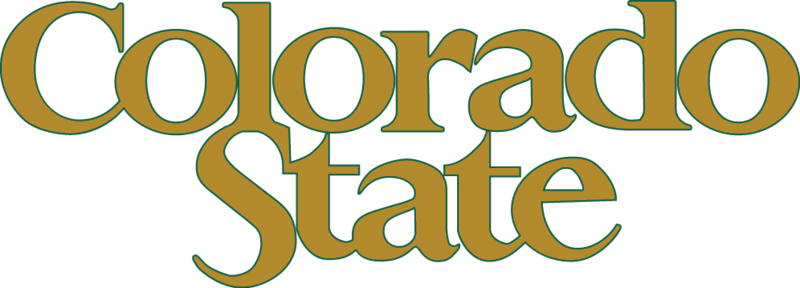
- Conference: Mountain West Conference
- Record: 4–7 (3–4 MW)
- Head coach: Sonny Lubick (12th season)
- Offensive coordinator: Dan Hammerschmidt (4th season)
- Defensive coordinator: Steve Stanard (2nd season)
- Home stadium: Sonny Lubick Field at Hughes Stadium

2004 Mountain West Conference football standings
	Conf.			Overall
Team	W		L	W		L
No. 4 Utah $	7	–	0	12	–	0
New Mexico	5	–	2	7	–	5
BYU	4	–	3	5	–	6
Wyoming	3	–	4	7	–	5
Air Force	3	–	4	5	–	6
Colorado State	3	–	4	4	–	7
San Diego State	2	–	5	4	–	7
UNLV	1	–	6	2	–	9
$ – Conference champion and BCS representative as top non-AQ school to meet automatic qualification criteria; Rankings from AP Poll

The 2004 Colorado State Rams football team represented Colorado State University during the 2004 NCAA Division I-A football season. They played their home games at Hughes Stadium in Fort Collins, CO and were led by head coach Sonny Lubick.

== Schedule ==
Date	Time	Opponent	Site	TV	Result	Attendance	Source
September 4	6:00 pm	at Colorado*	Folsom Field; Boulder, CO (Rocky Mountain Showdown)	FSN	L 24–27	54,954	
September 11	6:00 pm	at No. 1 USC*	Los Angeles Memorial Coliseum; Los Angeles, CA	ABC	L 0–49	85,521	
September 18	8:00 pm	No. 22 Minnesota*	Hughes Stadium; Fort Collins, CO	ESPN2	L 16–34	33,501	
September 25	1:00 pm	No. 21 (I-AA) Montana State*	Hughes Stadium; Fort Collins, CO		W 39–14	28,207	
October 2	8:00 pm	BYU	Hughes Stadium; Fort Collins, CO	SPW	L 21–31	32,511	
October 16	5:00 pm	at San Diego State	Qualcomm Stadium; San Diego, CA	ABC	W 21–17	31,129	
October 22	7:30 pm	Wyoming	Hughes Stadium; Fort Collins, CO (rivalry)	ESPN2	W 30–7	30,108	
October 30	1:00 pm	New Mexico	Hughes Stadium; Fort Collins, CO	ESPN+	L 17–26	24,573	
November 6	7:30 pm	at No. 7 Utah	Rice-Eccles Stadium; Salt Lake City, UT	ESPN2	L 31–63	44,222	
November 13	10:00 am	UNLV	Hughes Stadium; Fort Collins, CO	SPW	W 45–10	14,876	
November 20	1:00 pm	at Air Force	Falcon Stadium; USAFA, CO (rivalry)	ESPN+	L 17–47	34,441	
*Non-conference game; Rankings from AP Poll released prior to the game; All times are in Mountain time

== Roster ==
2004 Colorado State Rams football team roster
Players
Coaches
Offense

Pos.	#	Name	Class
WR	4	David Anderson	Jr
RB	20	Marcus Houston	Sr
RB	29	Kyle Bell	Fr
OL	63	Mike Brisiel	Jr
OL	71	Clint Oldenburg	So
OL	74	Erik Pears	Sr
C	77	Albert Bimper	Jr
TE	81	Joel Dreessen	Sr
TE	88	Brandon Alconcel	Jr

Defense

Pos.	#	Name	Class
DE	36	Mike Vomhof	Sr
DE	44	Bob Vomhof	Fr
DE	57	Tommie Hill	Fr
DE	93	Chris Kiffin	Sr

Special teams

Pos.	#	Name	Class
P	8	Jimmie Kaylor	Fr

Head coach

- Sonny Lubick

Coordinators/assistant coaches

Legend

- (C) Team captain
- (S) Suspended
- (I) Ineligible
- Injured
- Redshirt

Roster
Last update: 2004-08-13

== Team players in the NFL ==
Round	Pick	Player	Position	NFL club
6	198	Joel Dreessen	TE	New York Jets
