= Kirk Morrison =

American football player (born 1982)

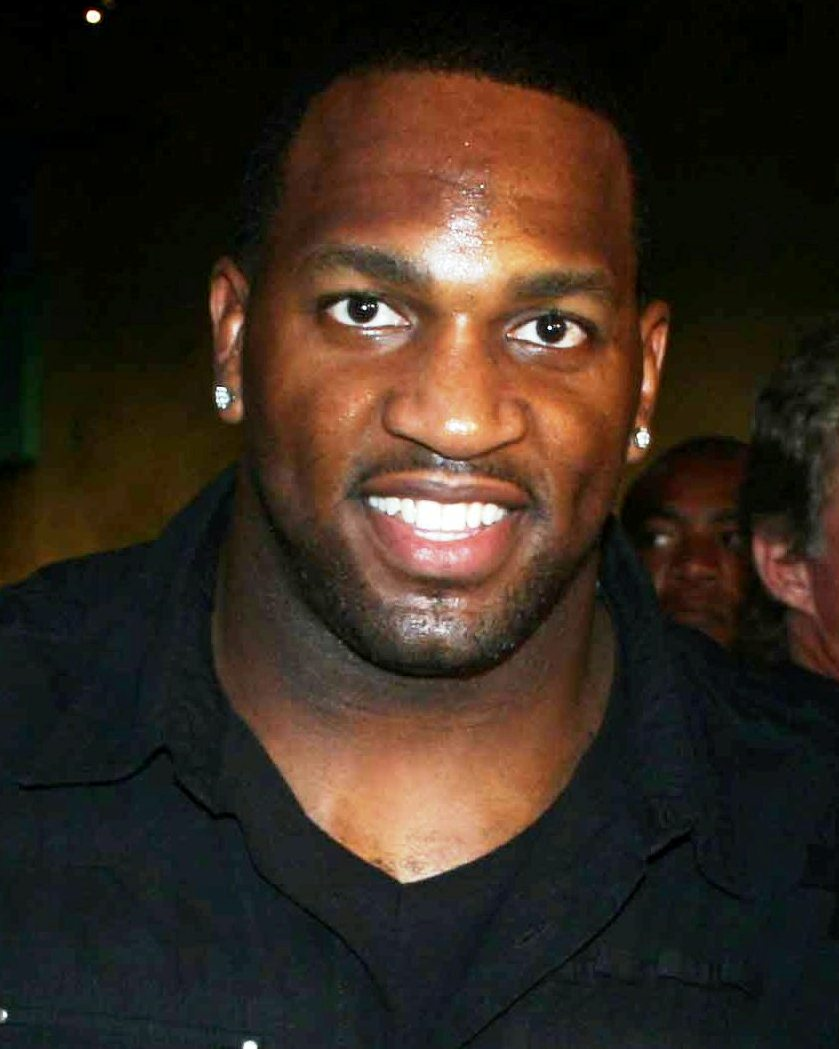
- Morrison in 2009

No. 52, 55, 58
- Position: Linebacker

Personal information
- Born: February 19, 1982 (age 44); Oakland, California, U.S.
- Listed height: 6 ft 2 in (1.88 m)
- Listed weight: 245 lb (111 kg)

Career information
- High school: O'Dowd (Oakland)
- College: San Diego State
- NFL draft: 2005: 3rd round, 78th overall pick

Career history
- Oakland Raiders (2005–2009); Jacksonville Jaguars (2010); Buffalo Bills (2011–2012)

Awards and highlights
- 2× MW Defensive Player of the Year (2003, 2004) (Note: Co-winner with safety Morgan Scalley in 2004.); 3× First-team All-MW (2002–2004)

Career NFL statistics
- Total tackles: 734
- Sacks: 6
- Forced fumbles: 6
- Fumble recoveries: 5
- Interceptions: 7
- Defensive touchdowns: 1
- Stats at Pro Football Reference

Kirk David Morrison (born February 19, 1982) is an American former professional football player who was a linebacker in the National Football League (NFL). He played college football for the San Diego State Aztecs. Morrison was selected by the Oakland Raiders in the third round of the 2005 NFL draft and also played for the Jacksonville Jaguars and Buffalo Bills.

== Early life ==
Morrison attended elementary school at Sacred Heart, now called St. Martin de Porress, in Oakland, California. After 8th grade graduation he went to Bishop O'Dowd High School which is also in Oakland, California. He won varsity letters in football and track & field. In football, he led his team to two HAAL championships and two Northern California section 3A championships, was a two-time All-HAAL honoree, and as a senior, was the HAAL Defensive Player of the Year.

== College career ==
Morrison attended college at San Diego State University and had an outstanding playing career. While at SDSU, he was two-time Mountain West Defensive Player of the Year. Morrison is a brother of the Delta Epsilon chapter of Kappa Alpha Psi.

== Professional career ==
Pre-draft measurables
Height	Weight	Arm length	Hand span	40-yard dash	20-yard shuttle	Three-cone drill	Vertical jump	Broad jump	Bench press
6 ft 1 in (1.85 m)	235 lb (107 kg)	31 1/2 in (0.80 m)	9 1/4 in (0.23 m)	4.75 s	4.28 s	7.12 s	33.0 in (0.84 m)	9 ft 6 in (2.90 m)	25 reps
All values from NFL Combine/Pro Day

=== Oakland Raiders ===
Morrison with the Raiders

Morrison played in all 16 games as a rookie, ending the season with 116 tackles and two pass deflections.

He finished the 2006 season with a team leading 128 tackles, a sack, a defensive touchdown, and two interceptions.

Morrison started the 2007 season with an interception in each of his first three games, joining Thomas Howard who had an interception through each of his first 4 games. He led the Oakland Raiders with 120 tackles, and tacked on 10 passes defended and a quarterback sack to his totals.

In 2008, Morrison ranked fifth in the NFL with 135 tackles. He also forced two fumbles and had one sack.

He finished the 2009 season tied 6th in the NFL with 133 tackles. He forced three fumbles, recovering one, and had two sacks while playing most of the season with a dislocated elbow.

=== Jacksonville Jaguars ===
Morrison was traded to the Jacksonville Jaguars along with a fifth-round pick in the 2010 NFL draft for the 108th pick in the same draft. Morrison's first game against his hometown and former team, the Oakland Raiders, was held in Jacksonville on December 12, 2010, the Jaguars won 38–31.

=== Buffalo Bills ===
On August 24, 2011, he signed with the Buffalo Bills. On December 3, 2012, he was released by the Bills. He was signed again by the Bills on December 20, 2012.

== NFL career statistics ==
Legend
	Led the league
**Bold**	Career high

Year	Team	Games		Tackles					Interceptions					Fumbles			
Year	Team	GP	GS	Cmb	Solo	Ast	Sck	TFL	Int	Yds	TD	Lng	PD	FF	FR	Yds	TD
2005	OAK	**16**	15	116	91	25	0.0	5	0	0	0	0	2	0	**2**	0	0
2006	OAK	**16**	**16**	128	102	26	1.0	**14**	2	32	0	31	5	1	1	**35**	**1**
2007	OAK	**16**	**16**	122	97	25	1.0	10	**4**	**94**	0	**45**	**10**	0	1	0	0
2008	OAK	**16**	**16**	**137**	101	**36**	1.0	2	1	0	0	0	1	2	0	0	0
2009	OAK	**16**	**16**	133	**109**	24	**2.0**	10	0	0	0	0	1	**3**	1	8	0
2010	JAX	**16**	**16**	89	64	25	0.0	4	0	0	0	0	1	0	0	0	0
2011	BUF	14	0	7	6	1	1.0	1	0	0	0	0	1	0	0	0	0
2012	BUF	2	0	2	2	0	0.0	0	0	0	0	0	0	0	0	0	0
		112	95	734	572	162	6.0	46	7	126	0	45	21	6	5	43	1

== Broadcasting career ==
It was announced in March 2011 that Morrison, along with Rob Dibble, will be part of Fox Overtime on FoxSportsRadio. In 2013 Morrison worked as a color analyst for San Diego State football games on the "Mighty 1090" radio (XX SPORTS RADIO) in San Diego and surrounding areas, teaming with play-by-play announcer Ted Leitner. For the 2017 season he was replaced by Rich Ohrnberger, when SDSU switched to iHeart Media (XTRA 1360 AM and KGB 101.5 FM) to broadcast Aztec basketball and football games.

In August 2014 Morrison was named as one of several analysts who will team with Dick Stockton to call NFL on Fox games on a rotating basis. On August 8, 2016, Morrison announced he was joining ESPN Los Angeles, covering Los Angeles Rams games. Since 2017, Morrison has served as an analyst for ESPN College Football coverage.
