= 2004 San Diego State Aztecs football team =

American college football season

2004 San Diego State Aztecs football
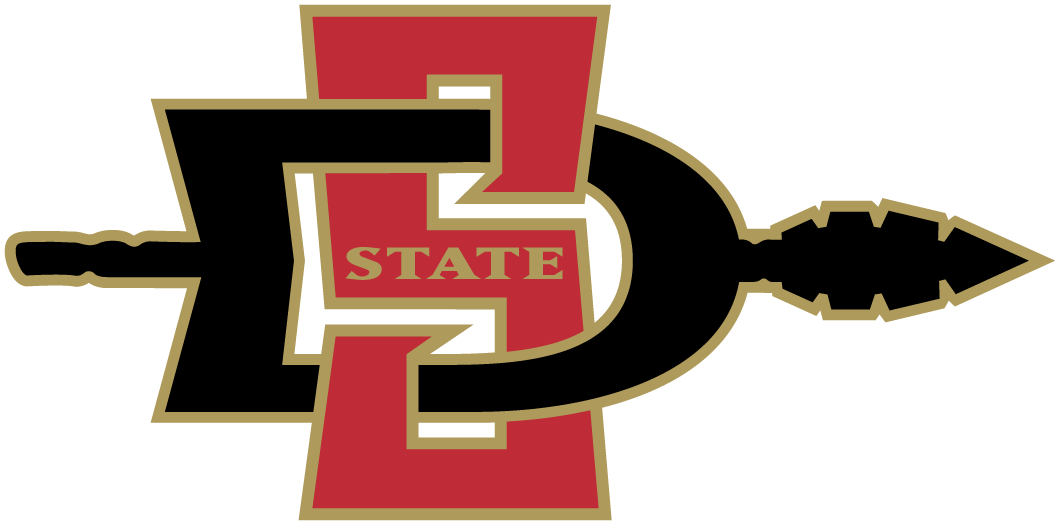
- Conference: Mountain West Conference
- Record: 4–7 (2–5 MW)
- Head coach: Tom Craft (3rd season)
- Offensive scheme: Spread
- Defensive coordinator: Thom Kaumeyer (3rd season)
- Base defense: 4–3
- Home stadium: Qualcomm Stadium

2004 Mountain West Conference football standings
	Conf.			Overall
Team	W		L	W		L
No. 4 Utah $	7	–	0	12	–	0
New Mexico	5	–	2	7	–	5
BYU	4	–	3	5	–	6
Wyoming	3	–	4	7	–	5
Air Force	3	–	4	5	–	6
Colorado State	3	–	4	4	–	7
San Diego State	2	–	5	4	–	7
UNLV	1	–	6	2	–	9
$ – Conference champion and BCS representative as top non-AQ school to meet automatic qualification criteria; Rankings from AP Poll

The 2004 San Diego State Aztecs football team represented San Diego State University in the 2004 NCAA Division I-A football season. They were coached by Tom Craft and played their home games at Qualcomm Stadium.

== Schedule ==
Date	Time	Opponent	Site	TV	Result	Attendance	Source
September 4	6:00 pm	Idaho State*	Qualcomm Stadium; San Diego, CA		W 38–21	57,216	
September 18	9:00 am	at No. 17 Michigan*	Michigan Stadium; Ann Arbor, MI	ESPN	L 21–24	109,432	
September 25	6:00 pm	Nevada*	Qualcomm Stadium; San Diego, CA		W 27–10	33,429	
October 2	4:00 pm	at UCLA*	Rose Bowl; Pasadena, CA	FSNW2	L 10–33	52,038	
October 9	12:00 pm	at Wyoming	War Memorial Stadium; Laramie, WY	ESPN Plus	L 10–20	19,540	
October 16	4:00 pm	Colorado State	Qualcomm Stadium; San Diego, CA	ABC	L 17–21	31,129	
October 23	3:30 pm	at New Mexico	University Stadium; Albuquerque, NM	SPW	L 9–19	37,287	
October 30	6:00 pm	No. 9 Utah	Qualcomm Stadium; San Diego, CA		L 28–51	32,683	
November 6	12:00 pm	at BYU	LaVell Edwards Stadium; Provo, UT	ESPN+	L 16–49	53,435	
October 21	12:00 pm	at Air Force	Falcon Stadium; Colorado Springs, CO	ESPN+	W 37–31	28,514	
November 20	7:00 pm	UNLV	Qualcomm Stadium; San Diego, CA	SPW	W 21–3	25,519	
*Non-conference game; Rankings from AP Poll released prior to the game; All times are in Pacific time
