= 2004 Wyoming Cowboys football team =

American college football season

2004 Wyoming Cowboys football

Las Vegas Bowl champion

Las Vegas Bowl, W 24–21 vs. UCLA
- Conference: Mountain West Conference
- Record: 7–5 (3–4 MW)
- Head coach: Joe Glenn (2nd season)
- Offensive coordinator: Billy Cockhill (2nd season)
- Offensive scheme: Multiple
- Defensive coordinator: Mike Breske (2nd season)
- Base defense: 3–4
- Home stadium: War Memorial Stadium

2004 Mountain West Conference football standings
	Conf.			Overall
Team	W		L	W		L
No. 4 Utah $	7	–	0	12	–	0
New Mexico	5	–	2	7	–	5
BYU	4	–	3	5	–	6
Wyoming	3	–	4	7	–	5
Air Force	3	–	4	5	–	6
Colorado State	3	–	4	4	–	7
San Diego State	2	–	5	4	–	7
UNLV	1	–	6	2	–	9
$ – Conference champion and BCS representative as top non-AQ school to meet automatic qualification criteria; Rankings from AP Poll

The 2004 Wyoming Cowboys football team represented the University of Wyoming as a member Mountain West Conference (MW) during the 2004 NCAA Division I-A football season. Led by second-year head coach Joe Glenn, the Cowboys compiled an overall record of 7–5 record with mark 3–4 in conference play, placing in a three-way tie for fourth in the MW. Wyoming was invited to the Las Vegas Bowl, where the Cowboys defeated UCLA. The team played home games at War Memorial Stadium in Laramie, Wyoming.

At quarterback, Corey Bramlet replaced his older brother, Casey, who graduated the previous season.

== Schedule ==
Date	Time	Opponent	Site	TV	Result	Attendance
September 4	1:00 pm	Appalachian State*	War Memorial Stadium; Laramie, WY		W 53–7	13,205
September 11	1:30 pm	at Texas A&M*	Kyle Field; College Station, TX	FSN	L 0–31	65,600
September 25	1:00 pm	Ole Miss*	War Memorial Stadium; Laramie, WY	PPV	W 37–32	22,331
October 2	1:00 pm	Louisiana–Monroe*	War Memorial Stadium; Laramie, WY		W 37–10	12,125
October 9	1:00 pm	San Diego State^{†}	War Memorial Stadium; Laramie, WY	ESPN Plus	W 20–10	19,540
October 16	8:00 pm	at Brigham Young	LaVell Edwards Stadium; Provo, UT	SPW	L 13–24	58,737
October 22	7:30 pm	at Colorado State	Hughes Stadium; Fort Collins, CO (Border War)	ESPN2	L 7–30	30,108
October 30	1:00 pm	Air Force	War Memorial Stadium; Laramie, WY		W 43–26	13,716
November 6	5:00 pm	at UNLV	Sam Boyd Stadium; Whitney, NV	SPW	W 53–45 ^{3OT}	19,752
November 13	5:00 pm	No. 7 Utah	War Memorial Stadium; Laramie, WY	ABC	L 28–45	17,074
November 20	1:00 pm	at New Mexico	University Stadium; Albuquerque, NM	ESPN Plus	L 9–16	35,333
December 23	8:45 pm	vs. UCLA*	Sam Boyd Stadium; Whitney, NV (Las Vegas Bowl)	ESPN	W 24–21	27,784
*Non-conference game; ^{†}Homecoming; Rankings from AP Poll released prior to the game; All times are in Mountain time

== Preseason ==
During the offseason, War Memorial Stadium was upgraded with new railings and improved handicap accessibility.

The big concern coming into spring training was the lack of depth on defense, a young and inexperienced offensive line and a poor running game. 13 starters and 38 lettermen returned. Fall practice began on August 11, 2004. The Cowboys participated in two intrasquad scrimmages. The first one was held August 21 and the second one five days later, on the 26th.

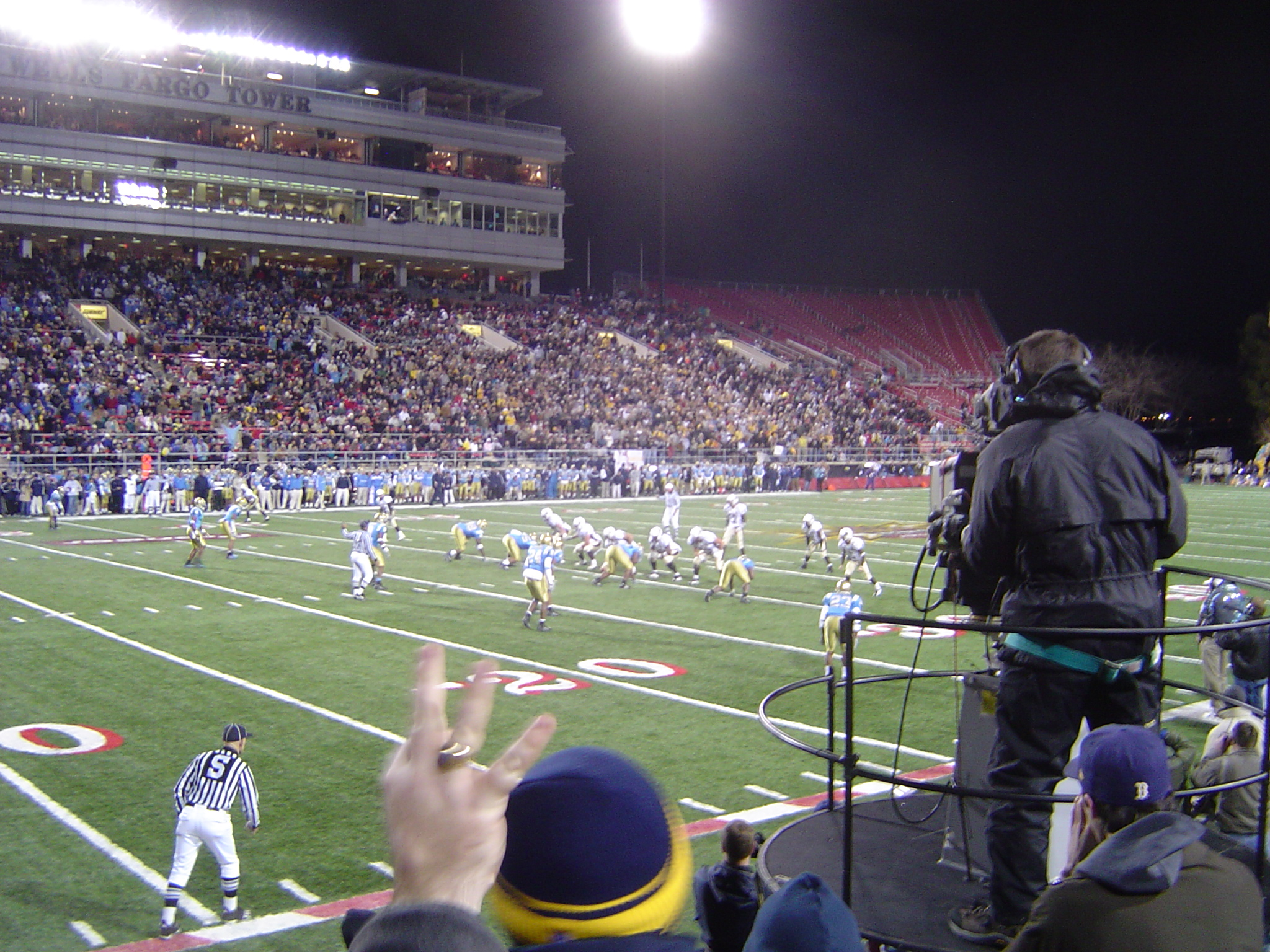
UCLA vs. Wyoming in the 2004 Las Vegas Bowl
