= 2004 Air Force Falcons football team =

American college football season

2004 Air Force Falcons football
- Conference: Mountain West Conference
- Record: 5–6 (3–4 MW)
- Head coach: Fisher DeBerry (21st season)
- Offensive scheme: Wishbone triple option
- Defensive coordinator: Richard Bell (10th season)
- Base defense: 3–4
- Captains: Adam Cole; Dan Shaffer; Ryan Carter; John Rudzinski; Alec Messerall
- Home stadium: Falcon Stadium

2004 Mountain West Conference football standings
	Conf.			Overall
Team	W		L	W		L
No. 4 Utah $	7	–	0	12	–	0
New Mexico	5	–	2	7	–	5
BYU	4	–	3	5	–	6
Wyoming	3	–	4	7	–	5
Air Force	3	–	4	5	–	6
Colorado State	3	–	4	4	–	7
San Diego State	2	–	5	4	–	7
UNLV	1	–	6	2	–	9
$ – Conference champion and BCS representative as top non-AQ school to meet automatic qualification criteria; Rankings from AP Poll

The 2004 Air Force Falcons football team represented the United States Air Force Academy as a member of the Mountain West Conference (MW) during the 2004 NCAA Division I-A football season. Led by 21st-year head coach Fisher DeBerry, the Falcons compiled an overall record of 5–6 with a mark of 3–4 in conference play, placing in a three-way tie for fourth in the MW. The team played home games at Falcon Stadium in Colorado Springs, Colorado

== Schedule ==
Date	Time	Opponent	Site	TV	Result	Attendance	Source
September 4	10:00 a.m.	No. 12 California*	Falcon Stadium; Colorado Springs, CO	ESPN2	L 14–56	50,075	
September 11	12:00 p.m.	Eastern Washington*	Falcon Stadium; Colorado Springs, CO		W 42–20	34,389	
September 18	8:00 p.m.	at UNLV	Sam Boyd Stadium; Whitney, NV		W 27–10	23,823	
September 25	1:00 p.m.	at No. 14 Utah	Rice–Eccles Stadium; Salt Lake City, UT	ESPN Plus	L 35–49	44,043	
September 30	5:45 p.m.	Navy*	Falcon Stadium; Colorado Springs, CO (Commander-in-Chief's Trophy)	ESPN	L 21–24	44,279	
October 9	4:30 p.m.	New Mexico	Falcon Stadium; Colorado Springs, CO	SPW	W 28–23	36,369	
October 23	1:00 p.m.	BYU	Falcon Stadium; Colorado Springs, CO	ESPN Plus	L 24–41	38,235	
October 30	1:00 p.m.	at Wyoming	War Memorial Stadium; Laramie, WY		L 26–43	13,716	
November 6	11:00 a.m.	at Army*	Michie Stadium; West Point, NY	ESPN Plus	W 31–22	40,129	
November 13	1:00 p.m.	San Diego State	Falcon Stadium; Colorado Springs, CO	ESPN Plus	L 31–37	28,514	
November 20	1:00 p.m.	Colorado State	Falcon Stadium; Colorado Springs, CO (rivalry)	ESPN Plus	W 47–17	34,441	
*Non-conference game; Rankings from AP Poll released prior to the game; All times are in Mountain time

== Awards ==
All-Mountain West team:

Jon Wilson, OL, 2nd team

Honorable mention: Ryan Carter, DL; Denny Poland, DB; John Rudzinski, LB; Darnell Stephens, RB; Ross Weaver, OL.

== Roster ==
No Name Pos Ht Wt Yr Hometown (High School)

- 1 Overton Spence ILB 6–2 240 Jr. Jacksonville, Florida (Andrew Jackson)
- 2 Carson Bird CB 5–11 185 Fr. Sharpsburg, Georgia (Northgate)
- 3 Julian Madrid FS 6–0 200 Fr. San Diego, California (St. Augustine)
- 5 Shaun Carney QB 5–10 195 Fr. North Olmsted, Ohio (St. Edward)
- 6 Chris Sutton, CB 6–0 190 So. Longview, Texas (Pine Tree)
- 7 Nate Allen CB 5–10 180 Sr. Converse, Texas (Judson)
- 8 Jacobe Kendrick SB 6–0 220 So. Midland, Texas (Midland Lee)
- 9 Jason Brown WR 6–4 220 Jr. Arvada, Colorado (Arvada West)
- 10 Adam Zanotti FAL 5–11 200 So. Bay City, Michigan (Bay City Central)
- 11 Bobby Giannini FS 6–2 210 Fr. Hawthorn Woods, Illinois (Stevenson)
- 12 Scott Eberle PK 6–1 200 Jr. Winona, Minnesota (Winona)
- 13 Andy Gray QB 6–2 195 Jr. Phoenix, Arizona (Deer Valley)
- 14 Lucas Ewing QB 6–0 185 So. Leslie, Michigan (Leslie)
- 15 Darnell Stephens HB 6–2 205 Sr. Midwest City, Oklahoma (Midwest City)
- 16 Adam Fitch QB 6–0 190 Jr. Gillette, Wyoming (Campbell County)
- 18 Justin Handley HB 5–8 175 So. Stone Mountain, Georgia (Dunwoody)
- 19 Jordan Wilkie CB 5–11 185 Sr. Eagan, Minnesota (Eagan)
- 20 Dan Shaffer FB 5–11 235 Sr. Lakewood, Colorado (Green Mountain)
- 21 Mark Carlson FS 6–0 190 Jr. Colorado Springs, Colorado (Santa Fe Christian)
- 22 Beau Suder FAL 5–11 190 So. Laramie, Wyoming (Laramie)
- 23 Jason Boman HB 6–1 205 Jr. Broomfield, Colorado (Broomfield)
- 24 Adam Cole FB 6–0 230 Sr. Dallas, Texas (Richardson)
- 25 Anthony Butler HB 5–9 200 Sr. San Jose, California (Gunn)
- 26 Jared Baxley FAL 6–0 195 So. Tampa, Florida (Chamberlain)
- 27 Denny Poland FAL 6–3 225 Jr. Pittsburgh, Pennsylvania (Central Catholic)
- 28 David Conley CB 5–10 190 Sr. Mesa, Arizona (Westlake)
- 29 Chris Huckins CB 5–10 175 So. Covington, New Mexico (Covington)
- 30 Donny Heaton P 6-2 195 Jr. Waterloo, Iowa (West)
- 31 John Taibi FAL 6–2 205 Jr. Englewood, Colorado (Cherry Creek)
- 32 Dominic Rickard FAL 5–10 170 Fr. Huntington Beach, California (Mater Dei)
- 33 Kris Holstege HB 5–10 190 Sr. Caledonia, Michigan (South Christian)
- 35 Todd Hadley CB 5–11 185 Jr. Fountain Hills, Arizona (Fountain Hills)
- 36 Brad Meissen CB 5–11 185 So. Madison, Wisconsin (La Follette)
- 37 Jonathan Lattimore CB 5–10 180 So. Austin, Texas (Westwood)
- 39 Chad Smith HB 5–10 185 Fr. River Oaks, Texas (Castleberry)
- 40 Trent White FB 5–10 235 So. Canton, Ohio (Massillon Jackson)
- 41 Travis Wittick FS 5–10 185 So. Rancho Santa Margarita, California (Mission Viejo)
- 42 Joey Keller ILB 6–2 230 So. Hastings, Michigan (Hastings)
- 43 Andrew Braley ILB 6–2 215 Jr. Valdosta, Georgia (Valdosta)
- 44 Rick Ricciardi ILB 6–1 235 So. Edwardsville, Illinois (Edwardsville)
- 45 Kenny Smith ILB 6–3 245 Sr. Kirtland, New Mexico (Kirtland Central)
- 47 Grant Scholl FS 6–1 200 So. Englewood, Colorado (Cherry Creek)
- 48 John Rudzinski ILB 6–2 235 Sr. Green Bay, Wisconsin (Notre Dame Academy)
- 49 Cameron Hodge ILB 6–2 230 Sr. Parker, Colorado (Ponderosa)
- 50 John Blake Peel C 6–2 265 Sr. San Antonio, Texas (Smithson Valley)
- 51 Marcus Brown ILB 6–2 240 Fr. Hephzibah, Georgia (Hephzibah)
- 53 Ryan Carter DE 6–2 250 Sr. Waterloo, Wisconsin (Edgewood)
- 54 Bryan Jones DS 6–1 235 So. Fort Walton Beach, Florida (Ft. Walton Beach)
- 55 Gilberto Perez NG 6–3 275 So. Tampa, Florida (Leto)
- 56 Jon Wilson OG/C 6–4 300 Jr. Tampa, Florida (Hillsborough)
- 57 Ross Weaver OT 6–7 295 Jr. Parker, Colorado (Ponderosa)
- 60 Stuart Perlow C 6–4 280 So. Lancaster, Ohio (Lancaster)
- 61 Tyler Dohallow OG 6–3 275 So. Conyers, Georgia (Salem)
- 62 Curtis Grantham OG 6–2 270 Jr. Aurora, Colorado (Overland Park)
- 63 Pat Edwards OG 6–2 260 Jr. Tallahassee, Florida (Lincoln)
- 64 Blaine Guenther OC 6–2 255 Fr. Graham, WA (Bethel)
- 65 Lawrence Hufford C/OG 6–1 280 Jr. Hamilton, Ohio (Badin)
- 67 Bob Scott OT 6–3 255 Jr. St. Louis, Missouri (Burroughs)
- 69 Caleb Morris OG/C 6–2 275 Fr. Spring, Texas (Spring)
- 70 Brian Jarratt OG 6–5 290 Sr. Three Rivers, Texas (Three Rivers)
- 72 Robert Kraay OT 6–8 285 So. Tucker, Georgia (Tucker)
- 74 Bert Thornton OT 6–5 300 Jr. Springfield, Missouri (Springfield Catholic)
- 75 Donald Whitt OT 6–5 290 So. DeSoto, Texas (DeSoto)
- 76 Joe McNulty OT 6–4 230 So. Lafayette, Louisiana (St. Thomas More)
- 77 Tyler Kimes OG 6–5 250 Jr. Eden Prairie, Minnesota (Eden Prairie)
- 78 Nelson Mitchell DE 6–1 260 Jr. Houston, Texas (St. Thomas)
- 80 Erik Anderson DE 6–8 280 Jr. Eden Prairie, Minnesota (Eden Prairie)
- 82 Alec Messerall WR 5–11 195 Sr. Alexandria, Ohio (Northridge)
- 83 J.P. Waller WR 6–2 205 Sr. Bryan, Texas (Bryan)
- 84 Chris Charron WR 6–2 200 Sr. Grand Island, Nebraska (Northwest)
- 85 Greg Kirkwood WR 6–2 205 Jr. Othello, WA (Othello)
- 86 Kevin Quinn DE 6–1 235 So. Westlake, Ohio (St. Edward)
- 87 Christopher Carp P 5-9 160 So. Katy, Texas (Katy)
- 88 Russ Mitscherling NG 6–3 285 Jr. Victoria, Texas (Memorial)
- 89 Noah Garguile TE 6–5 240 Fr. Bremerton, WA (Bremerton)
- 90 Chris Evans TE 6–2 240 Fr. San Antonio, Texas (Madison)
- 91 Robert McMenomy TE 6–4 235 Jr. Snellville, Georgia (South Gwinnett)
- 92 Dave Shaffer NG 6–3 280 Jr. Lakewood, Colorado (Green Mountain)
- 93 Michael Greenaway PK 5–10 180 Sr. Culpeper, Virginia (Culpeper County)
- 94 Carsten Stahr TE 6–3 245 Jr. Lincoln, Nebraska (Lincoln Christian)
- 95 Travis Dekker TE 6–4 235 Fr. Albuquerque, New Mexico (La Cueva)
- 96 Grant Thomas NG 6–1 275 So. Clovis, California (Buchanan)
- 97 Brendan Greenaway PK 6–3 200 So. Culpeper, Virginia (Culpeper County)
- 98 Chris Monson TE 6–4 250 Fr. White Bear Lake, Minnesota (White Bear Lake)
- 99 Nathan Terrazone DE 6–3 240 Sr. LaCrescenta, California (St. Francis)
