= Ryan Claridge =

American football player (born 1981)

Profile
- Position: Linebacker

Personal information
- Born: April 12, 1981 (age 45); Rochester, Michigan, U.S.
- Listed height: 6 ft 2 in (1.88 m)
- Listed weight: 259 lb (117 kg)

Career information
- College: University of Nevada, Las Vegas (2000–2004)
- NFL draft: 2005: 5th round, 170th overall pick

Career history
- New England Patriots (2005)

Awards and highlights
- Second-team All-MW (2004)

Ryan Quinlan Claridge (born April 12, 1981) is an American former professional football linebacker. He played in the National Football League (NFL) for the New England Patriots in the 2005 season, but was released early during 2006 training camp. He played college football at UNLV and is currently the owner of Big Apple Bagels in Traverse City, Michigan, which he purchased in May 2022.

== Early life ==
Claridge attended Almont High School in Almont, Michigan, and was a four-sport standout in football, tennis, basketball and track. In football, as a senior, he rushed for more than 1,300 yards and 27 touchdowns, was a first team All-Southern Thumb Association selection, was the League MVP and a first team All-State selection. He is the school record holder in rushing yards and rushing touchdowns, having played three years on the varsity team. In basketball, Claridge was the team's leading scorer and rebounder during his sophomore and senior seasons (he missed his junior season due to injury). In tennis, as a senior, he was also a first-team All-State selection. In track, as a junior, Claridge qualified for the state finals in the high jump and was also All-Southern Thumb Association in the 100-meter dash and the high jump.

== College and professional career ==
Claridge was recruited by College Football Hall of Famer John Robinson to the University of Nevada, Las Vegas as a linebacker for the Rebels football team. Claridge would play his entire eligibility at UNLV over five years, receiving a medical redshirt during the 2002 season due to a sports hernia.

Claridge was selected by the New England Patriots in the fifth round (170th overall) in the 2005 NFL draft. Claridge would spend the entire 2005 season on the team's practice squad before being cut during training camp in 2006.

== Personal life ==
Claridge's brother, the late Travis Claridge out of USC was a second round pick offensive lineman for the Atlanta Falcons in 2000.

After his professional football career was over, Claridge returned to southern Nevada and took up a coaching position with Coronado High School's Junior Varsity squad in 2007. The following season, Claridge would become the defensive coordinator for the varsity team at Del Sol High School and become a full-time teacher in the schools Driver's Education, Health and Physical Education Department. In 2011, Claridge left teaching/coaching to become a franchisee of Firehouse Subs in the Henderson/Las Vegas area. He owned and operated multiple Firehouse Subs before selling them after he moved back to Michigan. In 2015, he went back into education as a Physical Education teacher at Liberty High School and also served as the linebackers coach for Liberty's varsity football team.

Claridge was an investor in Philippi Sports Institute in Las Vegas, the institute is owned and operated by former World's Strongest Man finalist Mark Philippi. In May 2022, he purchased and locally operates a Big Apple Bagels franchise in Traverse City, Michigan.
