= Tremayne Kirkland =

American gridiron football player (born 1984)

Profile
- Position: Wide receiver

Personal information
- Born: January 26, 1984 (age 42); Sacramento, California, U.S.
- Listed height: 5 ft 11 in (1.80 m)
- Listed weight: 165 lb (75 kg)

Career information
- High school: Johnson (Sacramento, California)
- College: Portland State
- NFL draft: 2008: undrafted

Career history
- Spokane Shock (2008)*; South Georgia Wildcats (2009)*; Tri-Cities Fever (2009); Edmonton Eskimos (2010)
- * Offseason or practice squad member only

Awards and highlights
- FCS Third-team All-American (2007); First-team Big Sky (2007); Portland State Vikings team MVP (2007)

Tremayne Sy Kirkland (born January 26, 1984) is a former gridiron football wide receiver. He played college football at Portland State. He was originally signed as an undrafted free agent by the Spokane Shock, then of af2 in 2008. He's also played for the South Georgia Wildcats, Tri-Cities Fever, and Edmonton Eskimos of the Canadian Football League (CFL).

Kirkland originally attended UNLV for four years, competing in football only two of those years, redshirt freshman then medical redshirt two years later. He then transferred to Portland State where he played football for two years, after receiving a sixth year of eligibility.

== High school career ==
Kirkland attended Hiram W. Johnson High School where he was a First-team All-league and All-city quarterback. He rushed for 986 yards and 12 touchdowns while passing for 1,200 and 10 more touchdowns as a senior to help lead the Warriors to a 10–2 record in 2001. He was the first quarterback from his high school to earn All-city. He also lettered three times in basketball, twice in baseball, and ran relays for the track team.

== College career ==
=== UNLV ===
Kirkland then attended UNLV where he majored in University Studies. In 2002, he redshirted for the season. In 2003, as a redshirt freshman, he played in all 12 games as a kick returner and wide receiver. He returned every UNLV punt of the season and led the Mountain West Conference with an average of 12.6 yards-per-return, which ranked 17th in the nation. His total of 25 returns tied for third-most in school history and broke a freshman record of 11 set by Duane James in 1998. His total of 314 kick return yards ranked third all-time and more than doubled the freshman record of 132 set by James. Kirkland's season-long 75-yard return helped UNLV beat New Mexico. He also recorded three receptions for 13 yards. He also attempted a pass on a trick play against BYU.

In 2004, Kirkland had to use a medical redshirt and miss the entire season after separating his shoulder during preseason camp. He was named preseason First-team All-MWC as a punt returner by Phil Steele's, College Football News and Athlon Sports. He was ranked the #16 returner in the nation by The Sporting News. In 2005, he returned from his injury and played in eight games, and recorded 28 receptions for 254 yards and one touchdown. He also carried the ball 20 times for 109 yards and completed 3-of-5 passes for 101 yards and one touchdown, along with returning 11 punts for 69 yards.

=== Portland State ===
Then, in 2006, Kirkland transferred from UNLV to Portland State. He also had the possibility of petitioning the NCAA for a sixth year of eligibility due to his having to use a medical redshirt. For the 2006 season, he played in 10 games, recorded 38 receptions for 533 yards, and seven touchdowns. He also carried the ball seven times for 24 yards, and completed 1-of-1 passes for a 42-yard touchdown.

At the end of the 2006 season, Kirkland petitioned the NCAA for an additional year of eligibility to compete in four years of football, since he had only played in three-of-five since he had redshirt his freshman year, and an injury redshirt two years later. On May 23, 2007, he was granted a sixth year of eligibility by the NCAA.

As a sixth-year senior in 2007, Kirkland had one of the best seasons by a receiver in school history. He finished the season with 84 receptions for 1,059 receiving yards and 10 touchdowns in 10 games (missing one due to injury). His 84 receptions rank second in school history for a season. His 1,059 receiving yards rank 10th all-time in school history. It was the first 1,000-yard receiving season for a Viking since 2001. He led the conference and ranked second in the nation in receptions per game with 8.4, and sixth in yards per game with 105.9. He also carried the ball 12 times for 64 yards and a touchdown. He had 1,234 all-purpose yards for an average of 123.4 per game.

== Professional career ==
=== Pre-draft ===
Measureables
Ht.	Wt.	40 yd.	20 Shut.	3-cone	Vertical Jump	Bench Max.	Broad Jump
5'11"	165 lb.	4.37	4.15	7.04	36"	X	9'11"

After graduating from Portland State, and completing four years of college athletics, Kirkland declared for the NFL draft. He was rated, by NFLDraftScout.com as the 93rd wide receiver out of 334, and was projected to go unselected in the 2008 NFL draft, and did. He did receive one offer to attend training camp with the Oakland Raiders NFL team

=== af2 ===
On October 7, 2008, he signed with the Spokane Shock of the af2 football league. However, on February 18 he was traded by the South Georgia Wildcats to the Tri-Cities Fever.

== Personal ==
Kirkland is the son of Wardell and Wanda Kirkland, as well as a relative of former Los Angeles Rams defensive end Lamar Lundy.
