= Steve Savoy =

American gridiron football player (born 1982)

Steven Savoy (born February 27, 1982) is a former American football wide receiver for the Detroit Lions and in the Arena Football League who played for the Manchester Wolves, Arkansas Diamonds, Maryland Reapers and Kansas City Command. He played college football for the Utah Utes. He also played in the Canadian Football League for the Hamilton Tiger-Cats.
