= Greg Newman =

American football player (1986–2024)

Profile
- Position: Defensive lineman

Personal information
- Born: February 1, 1986; Santa Monica, California, U.S.
- Died: May 16, 2024 (aged 38); Thousand Oaks, California, U.S.

Career information
- High school: Westlake (Westlake Village, California)
- College: Colorado (2004); Utah (2005–2008)

Gregory Paul Newman (February 1, 1986 – May 16, 2024) was an American college football player who was a defensive lineman for the Utah Utes. Newman played at Westlake High School in California where he received numerous accolades. After redshirting for one year with the Colorado Buffaloes, he joined the Utes as a walk-on. In his senior year, he earned honorable mention all-Mountain West Conference honors and was part of the undefeated 2008 team that defeated Alabama in the Sugar Bowl.

== Early life ==
Newman was born in Santa Monica, California. He played as a defensive lineman at Westlake High School in Westlake Village, California, and he also played some fullback. During his tenure, the team reached the state finals twice and won the championship his senior year with a perfect 14–0 record. Newman received numerous accolades, including second team all-CIF in 2003, being named a PrepStar All-American and SuperPrep all-Far West. He was recognized as the Defensive Player of the Year for Ventura County and the Marmonte League, earning first-team all-CIF, all-Marmonte League, and all-Ventura County distinctions on two occasions. Newman was named the MVP of the CIF Championships and recorded 115 tackles in his senior season.

== College football ==
In 2005, Newman joined the Utes as a walk-on after transferring to the University of Utah from the University of Colorado Boulder, where he redshirted for a year. He did not play in 2005 due to NCAA transfer rules. In 2006, Newman was a backup defensive end. He excelled during Summer camp and eventually earned a scholarship on the 2007 Utes team and became a three-year letterman, playing both defensive end and tackle. He played on the defensive line with Paul Kruger, Koa Misi, Gabe Long, Derrick Shelby, Sealver Siliga, among others.

=== 2008 season ===
In 2008, Newman excelled for the Utes, starting all 13 games at tackle as Utah achieved a "perfect season." Newman played in the 2009 Sugar Bowl, defeating Alabama 31–17. In the game, Newman recorded four tackles and a sack of John Parker Wilson. Utah players felt disrespected by Alabama Coach Nick Saban's comment after the SEC championship game, referring to Alabama as the only team from a "real B.C.S. conference" to go undefeated in its league's regular season. Newman told the New York Times after defeating Alabama: "The whole team knew about that. We came out here hungry, ready to go. It was a slap in the face, no respect."

=== Statistics, awards and recognition ===
He finished the 2008 season as an honorable mention All-MWC tackle with following stats: 50 total tackles, 9.5 tackles for loss, two fumble recoveries, two pass breakups, and an interception. Over his college career, Newman amassed 73 career tackles, with 13.5 of those being for a loss. He was recognized with honorable mention all-conference honors during his senior year. In 2023, Newman and the rest of the 2008 team were inducted into the Crimson Club University of Utah Hall of Fame.

== Post-football life ==
Following a hamstring injury leading up to the NFL Combine that ended his professional football aspirations, Newman began to experience serious mental health issues, including paranoia, hallucinations, and mood instability. Over the next 15 years, he held various jobs but struggled to maintain steady employment due to his declining mental health. He lost multiple jobs and eventually became homeless in the years leading up to his death. According to family members, he began self-medicating in the last year of his life.

== Death and posthumous CTE diagnosis ==
Newman died in Newbury Park in Thousand Oaks, California, on May 16, 2024, at age 38. He died from multiple organ failure caused by excessive use of kratom, a legal but unregulated stimulant. His family donated his brain to the Boston University CTE Center and Brain Bank with the goal of helping other football players in the future. In 2025, researchers diagnosed Newman posthumously with Stage 2 Chronic Traumatic Encephalopathy (CTE), a degenerative brain disease linked to repeated head trauma. His case drew attention to the long-term neurological risks of football, particularly for athletes who do not reach the professional level.

== See also ==
- List of NFL players with chronic traumatic encephalopathy
