= 2008 Utah Utes football team =

American college football season

2008 Utah Utes football

National champion (Anderson & Hester) Mountain West champion Sugar Bowl champion

Sugar Bowl, W 31–17 vs. Alabama
- Conference: Mountain West Conference

Ranking
- Coaches: No. 4
- AP: No. 2
- Record: 13–0 (8–0 MW)
- Head coach: Kyle Whittingham (4th season)
- Offensive coordinator: Andy Ludwig (4th season)
- Offensive scheme: Spread
- Defensive coordinator: Gary Andersen (4th season)
- Base defense: 4–3
- Home stadium: Rice-Eccles Stadium

2008 Mountain West Conference football standings
	Conf.			Overall
Team	W		L	W		L
No. 2 Utah $	8	–	0	13	–	0
No. 7 TCU	7	–	1	11	–	2
No. 25 BYU	6	–	2	10	–	3
Air Force	5	–	3	8	–	5
Colorado State	4	–	4	7	–	6
UNLV	2	–	6	5	–	7
New Mexico	2	–	6	4	–	8
Wyoming	1	–	7	4	–	8
San Diego State	1	–	7	2	–	10
$ – Conference champion and BCS representative as top non-AQ school to meet automatic qualification criteria; Rankings from AP Poll

The 2008 Utah Utes football team represented the University of Utah in the 2008 NCAA Division I FBS football season. The team, coached by 4th year head football coach Kyle Whittingham, played its home games in Rice-Eccles Stadium. Utah was one of only two teams in the top-level Division I FBS to finish the regular season undefeated (the other being the Boise State Broncos), but after the Broncos were defeated by TCU in the Poinsettia Bowl and Utah won the Sugar Bowl over Alabama, the Utes finished as the nation's only undefeated team.

This season was the fifth undefeated and untied season in school history. During the 2008-2009 season, Utah defeated 4 teams that were ranked in the AP's final poll: #6 Alabama, #7 TCU, #18 Oregon State, and #25 BYU. Utah also began the season by defeating the Michigan Wolverines—ranked #24 at the time—in Ann Arbor. This resume propelled Utah to finish the season ranked #1 in four out of the six BCS computer models: Sagarin (Elo-Chess), Peter Wolfe, Anderson & Hester, and Massey.

Utah received championship recognition from NCAA-designated major selector Anderson & Hester. This designation is also recognized by Pac 12 record books. Kyle Whittingham received multiple coach of the year awards including from the Mountain West Conference, AFCA, and the Paul "Bear" Bryant Award.

Utah head coach Kyle Whittingham ranked the Utes No. 1 in protest on his final Coaches Poll ballot, ignoring an AFCA agreement that each voting coach should award the BCS champion first place. The Utes placed No. 4 in the final Coaches Poll.

== Schedule ==
Date	Time	Opponent	Rank	Site	TV	Result	Attendance
August 30	1:30 pm	at Michigan*		Michigan Stadium; Ann Arbor, MI	ABC	W 25–23	108,421
September 6	6:00 pm	UNLV	No. 22	Rice-Eccles Stadium; Salt Lake City, UT	the mtn.	W 42–21	45,587
September 13	6:00 pm	at Utah State*	No. 22	Romney Stadium; Logan, UT (Battle of the Brothers)	KJZZ	W 58–10	19,061
September 20	2:00 pm	at Air Force	No. 20	Falcon Stadium; Colorado Springs, CO	Versus	W 30–23	36,952
September 27	6:00 pm	Weber State*^{†}	No. 17	Rice-Eccles Stadium; Salt Lake City, UT		W 37–21	45,117
October 2	7:00 pm	Oregon State*	No. 15	Rice-Eccles Stadium; Salt Lake City, UT	Versus	W 31–28	45,599
October 11	12:00 pm	at Wyoming	No. 14	War Memorial Stadium; Laramie, WY	the mtn.	W 40–7	17,123
October 18	12:00 pm	Colorado State	No. 14	Rice-Eccles Stadium; Salt Lake City, UT	the mtn.	W 49–16	44,793
November 1	7:30 pm	at New Mexico	No. 10	University Stadium; Albuquerque, NM	the mtn.	W 13–10	30,901
November 6	6:00 pm	No. 11 TCU	No. 10	Rice-Eccles Stadium; Salt Lake City, UT	CBSCS	W 13–10	45,666
November 15	6:00 pm	at San Diego State	No. 8	Qualcomm Stadium; San Diego, CA	the mtn.	W 63–14	19,342
November 22	4:00 pm	No. 16 BYU	No. 8	Rice-Eccles Stadium; Salt Lake City, UT (Holy War)	the mtn.	W 48–24	46,488
January 2	6:00 pm	vs. No. 4 Alabama*	No. 7	Louisiana Superdome; New Orleans, LA (Sugar Bowl)	FOX	W 31–17	71,872
*Non-conference game; ^{†}Homecoming; Rankings from AP Poll released prior to the game; All times are in Mountain time

== Rankings ==
Ranking movements Legend: ██ Increase in ranking ██ Decrease in ranking — = Not ranked
	Week																
Poll	Pre	1	2	3	4	5	6	7	8	9	10	11	12	13	14	15	Final
AP	—	22	22	20	17	15	14	14	12	10	10	8	8	8	7	7	2
Coaches	—	23	22	20	17	15	13	13	12	9	9	7	7	7	7	7	4
Harris	Not released					15	13	14	12	10	9	8	8	8	7	7	Not released
BCS	Not released								11	10	8	7	7	6	6	6	Not released

== Preseason ==
=== Recruiting ===
College recruiting (2008)
Name	Hometown	School	Height	Weight	40^{‡}	Commit date
DeVonte Christopher; QB	Las Vegas, NV	Canyon Springs HS	6 ft 0 in (1.83 m)	181 lb (82 kg)	4.59	Jan 17, 2008
DeVonte Christopher; QB	Recruit ratings: Scout: Rivals: (40)					
Sausan Shakerin; RB	Sandy, UT	Alta HS	6 ft 2 in (1.88 m)	208 lb (94 kg)	4.5	Dec 6, 2007
Sausan Shakerin; RB	Recruit ratings: Scout: Rivals: (78)					
Aiona Key; WR	Citrus Heights, CA	Mt. SAC (JC)	6 ft 4 in (1.93 m)	209 lb (95 kg)	-	Jan 8, 2008
Aiona Key; WR	Recruit ratings: Scout: Rivals: (NA)					
Ryan Lacy; WR	Antelope, CA	Oakmont HS	5 ft 10 in (1.78 m)	183 lb (83 kg)	4.5	Feb 6, 2008
Ryan Lacy; WR	Recruit ratings: Scout: Rivals: (73)					
Luke Mathews; WR	Phoenix, AZ	Desert Vista HS	6 ft 1 in (1.85 m)	205 lb (93 kg)	4.5	Oct 7, 2007
Luke Mathews; WR	Recruit ratings: Scout: Rivals: (78)					
Kendrick Moeai; WR	West Jordan, UT	Copper Hills HS	6 ft 5 in (1.96 m)	200 lb (91 kg)	4.5	Jun 20, 2007
Kendrick Moeai; WR	Recruit ratings: Scout: Rivals: (40)					
David Reed; WR	New Britain, CT	Pasadena City College (JC)	6 ft 0 in (1.83 m)	184 lb (83 kg)	-	Jan 20, 2008
David Reed; WR	Recruit ratings: Scout: Rivals: (NA)					
Siaki Cravens; TE/LB	Temecula, CA	Teecula Valley HS	6 ft 1 in (1.85 m)	218 lb (99 kg)	4.6	Jul 14, 2007
Siaki Cravens; TE/LB	Recruit ratings: Scout: Rivals: (67)					
Dudley LaPorte; TE	Stratford, CT	Santa Barbara CC	6 ft 3 in (1.91 m)	240 lb (110 kg)	4.55	Feb 6, 2008
Dudley LaPorte; TE	Recruit ratings: Scout: Rivals: (NA)					
Sam Brenner; OL	Oceanside, CA	Oceanside HS	6 ft 3 in (1.91 m)	280 lb (130 kg)	5.0	Aug 1, 2007
Sam Brenner; OL	Recruit ratings: Scout: Rivals: (77)					
Zach Davila; OL	Vail, AZ	Cienega HS	6 ft 4 in (1.93 m)	315 lb (143 kg)	5.5	Jun 5, 2007
Zach Davila; OL	Recruit ratings: Scout: Rivals: (40)					
Sealver Siliga; OL/DL	West Jordan, UT	Copper Hills HS	6 ft 3 in (1.91 m)	345 lb (156 kg)	5.2	Jul 17, 2007
Sealver Siliga; OL/DL	Recruit ratings: Scout: Rivals: (40)					
Derek Tuimauga; OL	South Jordan, Utah	Bingham HS	6 ft 4 in (1.93 m)	335 lb (152 kg)	5.73	Jul 20, 2007
Derek Tuimauga; OL	Recruit ratings: Scout: Rivals: (76)					
Lamar Chapman; DB	Compton, CA	El Camino JC	5 ft 6 in (1.68 m)	160 lb (73 kg)	4.5	May 7, 2007
Lamar Chapman; DB	Recruit ratings: Scout: Rivals: (NA)					
Dave Kruger; DL	Orem, UT	Timpanogas HS	6 ft 5 in (1.96 m)	254 lb (115 kg)	5.0	Nov 25, 2007
Dave Kruger; DL	Recruit ratings: Scout: Rivals: (69)					
Overall recruit ranking: Scout: 65 Rivals: 60
‡ Refers to 40-yard dash; Note: In many cases, Scout, Rivals, 247Sports, On3, and ESPN may conflict in their listings of height, weight and 40 time.; In these cases, the average was taken. ESPN grades are on a 100-point scale.; Sources: "Utah Commit List 2008". Rivals.; "2008 Player Commitments - Utah". ESPN.; "2008 Team Ranking". Rivals.com.

== Game summaries ==
=== Michigan ===
	1	2	3	4	Total
Utes	6	16	3	0	25
Wolverines	10	0	0	13	23

Series Tied: 1 – 1 – 0

Utah fans went to the Big House hoping for a better outcome than the last time the Utes visited Michigan Stadium, which resulted in a 10–7 loss in 2002. New Michigan coach Rich Rodriguez's offense was new to a Michigan squad built to run a smashmouth offense and was slow to get things going against the Ute defense, and the experienced Michigan defense prevented the Utah offense from gaining momentum. After a slow start for both teams, the Ute offense scored finally started clicking and scored sixteen points in the 2nd quarter taking a 22–10 lead into half-time. The offense wouldn't be able to do much the rest of the game. In the 2nd half it was more of the same from the 1st quarter, the only score coming off of a 53-yard field-goal from Louie Sakoda to put the Utes up 25–10. Michigan scored on the first play of their 2nd possession of the 4th quarter with a 33-yard touchdown pass by Steven Threet to Junior Hemingway, inching closer to the Utah lead. Only two minutes later Michigan RB Sam Mcguffie ran into the endzone from three yards out bringing the Wolverines to within two points, but failed on the ensuing two-point conversion. Utah was able to run out most of the clock before turning the ball over on downs to the Wolverines who were unable to score before time expired, giving the Utes their first win of the season and improving Kyle Whittingham's record against BCS opponents to 5–3.

=== UNLV ===
	1	2	3	4	Total
Rebels	7	7	0	7	21
# 22 Utes	0	14	21	7	42

Utah Leads Series: 12 – 2 – 0

After an emotional win against Michigan in the season opener, UNLV provided the perfect opponent for Utah to avoid having a "let-down" game as the Rebels embarrassed Utah in Las Vegas the year before, winning 27–0 in one of the most troublesome losses in Utah history. Things did not start off well as UNLV, behind the running of Frank Summers, took first half-leads of 7–0 and 14–7.

But shortly before halftime, quarterback Brian Johnson led the Utes on an eighty-yard drive that tied the game going into halftime, and Utah scored on its first four possessions of the second half to turn the game into a rout. Six different Utah players scored touchdowns, and both Johnson and running back Matt Asiata ran and threw for a touchdown.

=== Utah State ===
	1	2	3	4	Total
#22 Utes	17	13	14	14	58
Aggies	7	0	3	0	10

Utah Leads Series: 76 – 28 – 4

Even though Utah faced an early 7–0 deficit, this game was never close. Utah scored the game's next thirty points and Matt Asiata tacked on a pair of second-half touchdowns to finish with three rushing TDs as the Utes won going away. Utah State finished with just 116 yards of total offense, and 57 of those came on its final drive of the game against Utah's reserves. Both of Utah State's scoring drives came on short fields caused by turnovers.

=== Air Force ===
	1	2	3	4	Total
#20 Utes	9	0	7	14	30
Falcons	0	16	0	7	23

Air Force Leads Series: 14 – 11 – 0

Despite outgaining the Falcons 440-191 and holding Air Force's vaunted option attack to a 30-year low of 53 yards rushing, Utah needed to put together an 11-play, 80-yard drive capped by Darrell Mack's third rushing touchdown with 58 seconds remaining to win.

Offensively, Utah dug itself a hole after building a 9–0 lead. Johnson threw an interception in the end zone and had a second-quarter fumble returned for another touchdown to give Air Force a 16–9 halftime lead. But a ground-heavy attack helped Utah tie the game early in the second half and Air Force never threatened again to take the lead. Mack finished with 101 yards and three scores on 18 carries, while Asiata finished with 116 yards on 19 carries.

=== Weber State ===
	1	2	3	4	Total
Wildcats	7	0	0	14	21
#17 Utes	7	17	10	3	37

Utah Leads Series: 3 – 0 – 0

With a game in just five days against Oregon State—fresh off an upset victory over then-No. 1 Southern California, the Utes did enough to decide the outcome early. Utah rolled up 450 yards of total offense to take a 37–7 lead early in the fourth quarter before the Wildcats—coached by former Utah head coach Ron McBride and a member of the Football Championship Subdivision—scored twice late to make the final score respectable. With 13 points on three field goals and four extra points, Utah kicker Louie Sakoda became the all-time leading scorer in school history.

=== Oregon State ===
	1	2	3	4	Total
Beavers	3	12	6	7	28
#15 Utes	3	17	0	11	31

Oregon State Leads Series: 9 – 5 – 1

Utah scored 11 points in the final 1:29 to escape with a victory. Utah trailed 9–3 early in the second quarter before finishing off the half with a Louie Sakoda 28-yard field goal and touchdowns of 14 yards from Brian Johnson to Freddie Brown and a 12-yard run by Brent Casteel to take a 20–9 halftime lead. Oregon State reeled off 19 straight points of its own to take a 28–20 lead with 2:18 left to play. In a departure from conventional football strategy, Oregon State had elected twice to go for two points after its first two touchdowns of the half (its PAT after the first touchdown was blocked, resulting in coach Mike Riley to "chase points" by going for 2) instead of kicking extra points.

Had it kicked extra points, Oregon State would have led 30–20. But Johnson lead a 4-play, 60-yard drive capped by a 25-yard scoring pass to Bradon Godfrey, then rushed for the 2-point conversion to tie the game, but only after Oregon State was whistled for pass interference on Utah's first two-point try.

Oregon State then threw incomplete on first down, ran out of bounds to stop the clock on second down (another time-honored no-no in football at that stage of the game) and threw incomplete on third down. After a 31-yard punt, Oregon State had used up just 23 seconds, which left plenty of time for a game-winning drive. Johnson threw for 7, 8 and 16 yards to get the Utes into Sakoda's range, and his 37-yard field goal as time expired was good.

=== Wyoming ===
	1	2	3	4	Total
#14 Utes	10	17	7	6	40
Cowboys	0	0	0	7	7

Utah Leads Series: 49 – 31 – 1

Fighting winds in excess of 40 mph (64 km/h), Utah won handily on a day in which the offense was outgained 252–242 by scoring a touchdown on defense and two more on special teams. Sean Smith picked off a deflected pass on Wyoming's second possession and returned it 25 yards for a score—one of two interceptions on the day for the all-Mountain West Conference cornerback. After a pair of Louie Sakoda field goals made the score 13–0, Aiona Key blocked a Wyoming punt and returned it 6 yards for a touchdown. Matt Asiata added a rushing and receiving touchdown to give Utah a 34–0 lead, and RJ Rice's recovery of a muffed punt in the end zone accounted for the final score.

=== Colorado State ===
	1	2	3	4	Total
Rams	7	6	3	0	16
#14 Utes	14	14	7	14	49

Utah Leads Series: 53 – 22 – 2

For the first time all season, Utah used a variety of big plays on offense to bury the improved Rams. Brian Johnson threw touchdowns of 32 and 33 yards to Freddie Brown and David Reed and backup quarterback Corbin Louks ran for scores of 21 and 69 yards. Wide receiver Jereme Brooks ran 34 yards for another score as Utah piled up 549 yards of total offense, 327 on the ground.

=== New Mexico ===
	1	2	3	4	Total
#10 Utes	3	3	7	0	13
Lobos	0	3	7	0	10

Utah Leads Series: 31 – 17 – 2

The Lobos had marred great Utah seasons before, most notably in 1994 when it beat an undefeated Utes team ranked #8 in the country for their first loss and handing the 2003 MWC champions its only conference loss (and one of two all year) in a lopsided win at Rice-Eccles Stadium. New Mexico almost did it again, but the special teams rose to the occasion for the Utes as Key blocked a first-half field goal attempt and Louie Sakoda repeatedly pinned the Lobos deep with well-placed punts. His last put the Lobos at their own 1 with 1:58 left, and the Lobos, with no timeouts, could only get to the Utah 46 before time expired. Sakoda kicked a pair of field goals and Casteel's 10-yard catch from Brian Johnson gave Utah a 13–3 lead late in the third quarter, a lead which ultimately held up.

=== TCU ===
	1	2	3	4	Total
#12 Horned Frogs	10	0	0	0	10
#8 Utes	3	3	0	7	13

Utah Leads Series: 5 – 1 – 0

This game was advertised as a "Blackout". The Utes wore black uniforms for the first time in school history and the fans responded by turning Rice-Eccles Stadium into a sea of black. None of it fazed TCU, which went 64 and 72 yards on its first two possessions to take a quick 10–0 lead. Louie Sakoda's 49-yard field goal with 2:37 left in the first quarter got Utah on the board, and Smith's interception right before half time helped set up another Sakoda field goal, this one from 37 yards.

TCU's defense, coupled with some untimely playcalling by Utah, made the Frogs' 10–6 lead stand up deep into the fourth quarter. But TCU kicker Ross Evans missed two field goals—the first off the left upright, the second wide right, giving Utah one final shot at salvaging frontrunner status in the MWC and for a BCS bid as it took over on its own 20 with 2:48 left. Completions of 5 and 7 yards got Utah a first down, then Brian Johnson connected with Casteel for a 22-yard strike to get into TCU territory.

A pass interference call moved the ball to the TCU 31, where Utah faced its most crucial point of the season. Facing 4th and 5 after a pair of incompletions and a 5-yard pass to Godfrey, Johnson beat the blitz and found Brown for an 11-yard gain to the TCU 15. Another pass to Godfrey put the ball at the TCU 9, and Johnson found Brown on a slant pattern for the winning touchdown on the next play. Versus commentators Tommy Hart and Dan Fouts gave a memorable account of the crowd noise after the touchdown:

Hart: This is a well-built stadium. This press box is shaking right now.

Fouts: Oh good, I thought it was my knees. You get a little excited when you see a great 80-yard drive engineered by Brian Johnson ... 7 of 9 on that drive and the capper, finding Freddie Brown downtown.

TCU would get the ball back with one more shot to get into field goal range—and for Evans to redeem himself for his two previous misses. But Andy Dalton, on 4th and 10 with just seconds to go, was intercepted on a deep pass by Robert Johnson at the Utah 15 to end the game.

=== San Diego State ===
	1	2	3	4	Total
#7 Utes	14	21	0	28	63
Aztecs	0	7	7	0	14

Utah Leads Series: 15 – 12 – 1

Brian Johnson had an excellent performance as Utah tuned up for the following week's showdown with BYU by throwing five first-half touchdowns, completing 27 of 38 passes for 283 yards as the Utes were in control the entire game. Backup safety Deshawn Richard would return two passes 89 and 36 yards for touchdowns in the final quarter to put an exclamation point on the Utes' rout of the Aztecs.

=== Brigham Young ===
	1	2	3	4	Total
#14 Cougars	3	14	7	0	24
#7 Utes	10	17	0	21	48

Utah Leads Series: 53 – 33 – 4
During this game, BYU committed six turnovers and Utah committed none. Brian Johnson won his matchup against his counterpart, Max Hall, completing 30 of 36 passes for 303 yards and four touchdowns, while Hall went 21 of 41 and 205 yards, no touchdowns, five interceptions, and a fumble.

Johnson lead Utah to points on its first three possessions for a 17–3 lead. BYU scored twice to tie the game 17–17. Louie Sakoda made a 35-yard field goal with 1:41 left in the first half to give Utah a 20–17 lead. On BYU's next possession, Hall threw an interception and was flagged for unsportsmanlike conduct, which gave Utah the ball at the BYU 44 yard line. Two plays resulted in a first down before Johnson found David Reed for a 32-yard strike in the corner of the end zone for a 27–17 halftime lead.

Hall rushed 11 yards for a touchdown with 6:46 left in the third quarter to get BYU within three, 27–24. BYU's final five possessions ended in turnovers, four interceptions and a fumble.

Starting with the fumble, Utah scored touchdowns on three straight possessions. Three plays into the fourth quarter, Casteel caught a pass in the flat and ran 8 yards for a touchdown and a 34–24 lead. BYU's next turnover was an interception by Paul Kruger. On the next play, Asiata took the direct snap, ran forward two steps and threw a jump pass to Chris Joppru in the back of the end zone for a 41–24 lead with 12 minutes left in the game. Smith's fifth interception of the year helped Johnson cap his day with a 1-yard scoring pass to tight end Colt Sampson, and for the third time this season Utah fans rushed the field after a victory against a ranked team.

=== Sugar Bowl: Utah vs. Alabama ===
Utah Leads Series: 1 – 0 – 0

	1	2	3	4	Total
#6 Utes	21	0	7	3	31
#4 Crimson Tide	0	10	7	0	17

Wow! Wow! Wow!

— Fox Sports color commentator Darryl Johnston, after Utah opened up a 21–0 first-quarter lead

Utah, 9½ point underdogs entering the game, treated the Superdome crowd of 71,872 to an offensive explosion in the first quarter and a dominant defense in beating fourth-ranked Alabama to cap a perfect 13–0 season—the second undefeated season in five years for the Utes.

Alabama picked up one first down on its opening drive, but a third-down sack of quarterback John Parker Wilson by Stevenson Sylvester—the first of three for the junior linebacker—ended the threat. Utah immediately went to work on offense as quarterback Brian Johnson completed all five of his passes to five different receivers, the touchdown pass coming on a 7-yarder to Casteel.

The Tide's poor start continued as Wilson was intercepted by Robert Johnson on the second play of the ensuing drive. Starting from the Alabama 32, Brian Johnson connected with David Reed on a 30-yard pass to the Alabama 2, and Asiata took it in two plays later for a score out of the "Wildcat" formation for a 14–0 lead.

Kepa Gaison ended Alabama's third drive with another sack, and Brian Johnson quickly fired up the Ute attack, completing 5 of 7 passes for 50 yards, drawing a pass interference penalty on Alabama and running another 9 yards for a first down on 3rd-and-4 from midfield. Bradon Godfrey capped the drive with an 18-yard touchdown reception, and Utah led 21–0 just 11 minutes into the game.

Alabama rallied, scoring 17 straight points on Leigh Tiffin's 52-yard field goal and Javier Arenas' 73-yard punt return in the second quarter, and Glenn Coffee's 4-yard touchdown catch off a short field caused by a Brian Johnson fumble to start the third quarter.

But as it had done against Air Force, Oregon State and TCU, the Utah offense responded when it had to. Brian Johnson's first pass of the ensuing drive went to Brown for 33 yards, and Godfrey gained 10 on 3rd-and-10 to keep the drive alive. Facing 3rd-and-10 at the Alabama 28, Johnson threw into the left flat for Reed, who slipped a tackle and went into the end zone untouched for a 28–17 lead.

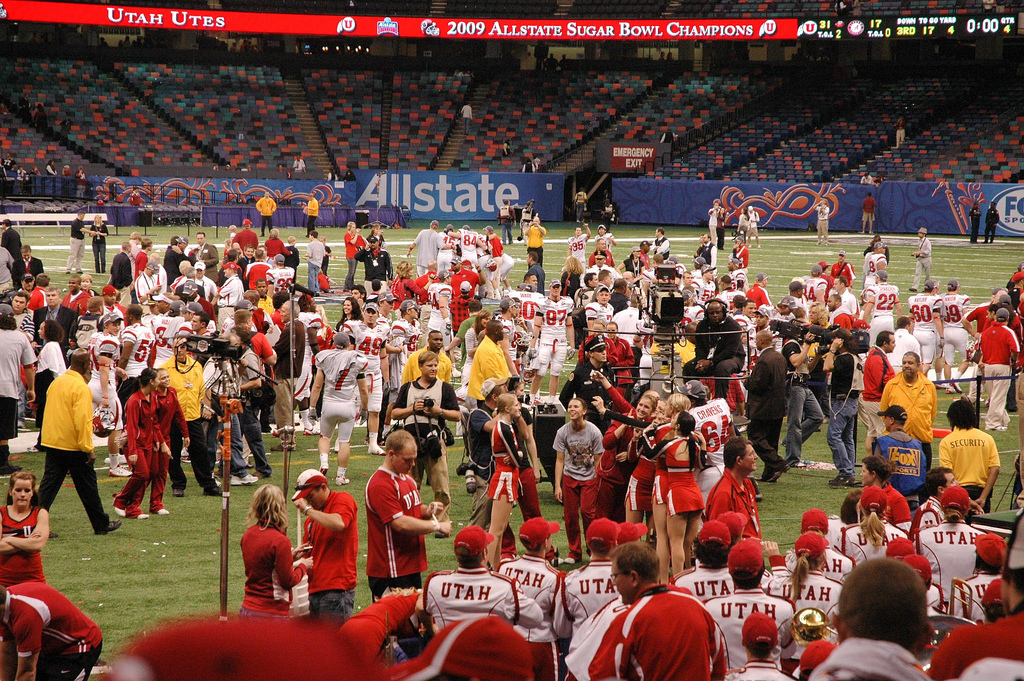
The Utes talk to the media after winning the Sugar Bowl

The Utah defense dominated from there, sacking Wilson four more times (Utah finished with eight sacks; Alabama had given up 13 all season entering the game), forcing a Wilson fumble that Utah recovered and turned into the final points, a 28-yard field goal by Louie Sakoda, and a second interception. Alabama crossed midfield just once after the Reed touchdown, and never got any further than the Utah 32.

The final box score revealed an unexpected advantage for Utah. Alabama's run game, which ranked 22nd nationally at 196 yards per game entering the contest, was held to 31 yards on 33 carries. Alabama had given up only 27 first-quarter points and one first-quarter touchdown all season long; against Utah it gave up 21 and three, respectively.

Alabama's secondary was 13th nationally in pass efficiency defense at 101.63, but Johnson's passer rating for this game was 158.84. Johnson finished 27 of 41 for 336 yards and three TDs—all of which were the most yards, completions and TDs the Tide had given up to a single quarterback all season long.

The victory marked Utah's eighth consecutive bowl victory—the longest active streak in the country—and was the program's first victory against an SEC school in seven tries. It also became the first program in the BCS era to finish a season undefeated twice, joining the 2004 team.

== Utah's poll finish ==
The effects of this game were monumental. Immediately, on sports internet site polls and in newspaper columns, the Utes' case for a share of the national championship was made. Among the noteworthy members of the press to chime in were Rick Reilly of ESPN The Magazine and John Feinstein of The Washington Post.

In the end, sixteen AP voters went against the result of the BCS title game and voted Utah No. 1. It was not enough to offset Florida's forty-eight first-place votes, but Utah still finished a comfortable No. 2, surpassing its No. 4 finish in the 2004 season for its highest ranking ever. Utah also placed ahead of two teams which won their BCS bowl games—traditional powers Southern California and Texas, both of whom entered the bowl season ranked ahead of Utah. USC earned one first-place vote, but finished No. 3.

In the coaches poll, Utah finished fourth and earned one first-place vote courtesy of head coach Kyle Whittingham, who vowed after the Sugar Bowl to vote Utah No. 1—despite his obligations as a member of the American Football Coaches Association to vote the winner of the BCS title game in the top spot.

The computers which make up the BCS standings told a different story. Utah was ranked first in four of the six BCS computer models: Sagarin (Elo-Chess), Peter Wolfe, Anderson & Hester and Massey. Utah finished third in the Colley Matrix and Richard Billingsley rankings. Florida didn't finish lower than second in any of the computer rankings, but earned only two first-place finishes amongst the computers.

The Anderson & Hester poll, an NCAA-designated major selector, selected Utah as its national champion.

== Depth chart ==
These are the projected starters and primary backups as of November 2008.

Defense

FS
Robert Johnson
Terrell Cole

WLB	MLB	SLB
⋅	Mike Wright	⋅
Chaz Walker	Mo Neal	⋅

SS
Joe Dale
R.J. Rice

CB
Sean Smith
Brandon Burton

DE	DT	DT	DE
Paul Kruger	Derrick Shelby	Greg Newman	Koa Misi
Derrick Shelby	Kenape Eliapo	Sealver Siliga	Christian Cox

CB
Brice McCain
Justin Jones

Offense

WR
Bradon Godfrey
David Reed

WR
Freddie Brown
Aiona Key

LT	LG	C	RG	RT
Zane Beadles	Caleb Schlauderaff	Zane Taylor	Robert Conley	Dustin Hensel
Tony Bergstrom	Louis Finner	Tyler Williams	Corey Seiuli	Walter Watts

TE
Chris Joppru
Colt Sampson

WR
Brent Casteel
Jereme Brooks

QB
Brian Johnson
Corbin Louks

Key reserves
RB Eddie Wide

RB
Darrell Mack
Matt Asiata

== Statistics ==
2008 Official Stats

=== Team ===
	Utah	Opp
Scoring	480	224
Points per game	36.9	17.2
First downs	282	209
Rushing	112	78
Passing	154	103
Penalty	16	28
Rushing yards	2034	1289
Avg per play	4.1	3.1
Avg per game	156.5	99.2
Rushing touchdowns	24	10
Passing yards	3178	2470
Att-Comp-Int	414-279-9	409-225-19
Avg per pass	7.7	6.0
Avg per catch	11.4	11.0
Avg per game	244.5	190.0
Passing touchdowns	29	15
Total offense	5212	3759
Avg per play	5.7	4.6
Avg per game	400.9	289.2
Fumbles lost	23-9	21-12
Penalties – yards	90-817	91-661
Avg per game	62.8	50.8

	Utah	Opp
Punts – yards	57-2357	78-3034
Avg per Punt	41.4	38.9
Time of possession/game	32:21	27:38
3rd down conversions	82-181	54-178
4th down conversions	10-15	6-15
Touchdowns scored	59	28
Field goals – attempts	22-24	11-19
PAT – attempts	56-57	23-24
Attendance	273520	231800
Games/Avg per game	6-45542	6-38633
Neutral Site	1-71872	

=== Individual Leaders ===
Passing
Player	COMP	ATT	Pct.	YDS	TD	INT	QB rating
Brian Johnson	268	394	.680	2972	27	9	149.43
Corbin Louks	4	7	.571	104	0	0	181.94
Chad Manis	3	4	.750	24	-	-	125.4
Matt Asiata	2	3	.667	36	2	0	387.47

Rushing
Player	ATT	YDS	YPC	TD
Matt Asiata	146	707	4.8	12
Darrell Mack	123	541	4.4	3
Corbin Louks	27	218	8.1	3
Eddie Wide	30	183	6.1	-
Brian Johnson	108	128	1.2	1

Receiving
Player	REC	YDS	YPR	TD
Freddie Brown	77	900	11.7	7
Bradon Godfrey	56	556	9.9	4
Brent Casteel	43	564	13.1	4
David Reed	25	427	17.1	6
Jereme Brooks	30	331	11.0	1
Matt Asiata	13	111	8.5	1

Tackles
Player	Solo	Asst	Total	TFL	Sacks
Mike Wright	35	46	81	2.5	1
Stevenson Sylvester	33	40	73	8	3.5
Koa Misi	31	37	68	8.5	3
Joe Dale	35	31	66	6.5	1
Paul Kruger	31	30	61	16.5	7.5
Greg Newman	20	30	50	9.5	2.5
Sean Smith	23	22	45	2	1

Pass defense
Player	INT	YDS	Broken up
Sean Smith	5	151	9
Robert Johnson	4	7	3
Deshawn Richard	3	138	0
Joe Dale	3	9	4
Paul Kruger	1	30	7

== NFL draft ==
The Utes had four players go in the 2009 NFL draft:

Player	Position	Round	Pick	NFL club
Paul Kruger	Defensive end	2	57	Baltimore Ravens
Sean Smith	Cornerback	2	61	Miami Dolphins
Brice McCain	Cornerback	6	188	Houston Texans
Freddie Brown	Wide receiver	7	252	Cincinnati Bengals

== See also ==
- List of undefeated NCAA Division I football teams
