= 2012 Baltimore Ravens season =

17th season in Baltimore Ravens history, second Super Bowl appearance and win

- Owner: Steve Bisciotti
- General manager: Ozzie Newsome
- Head coach: John Harbaugh
- Offensive coordinator: Cam Cameron (fired Dec 10); Jim Caldwell (interim)
- Defensive coordinator: Dean Pees
- Home stadium: M&T Bank Stadium

Results
- Record: 10–6
- Division place: 1st AFC North
- Playoffs: Won Wild Card Playoffs (vs. Colts) 24–9; Won Divisional Playoffs (at Broncos) 38–35 (2OT); Won AFC Championship (at Patriots) 28–13; Won Super Bowl XLVII (vs. 49ers) 34–31
- Pro Bowlers: Selected but did not participate due to participation in Super Bowl XLVII: RB Ray Rice; FB Vonta Leach; G Marshal Yanda; DT Haloti Ngata; FS Ed Reed; KR Jacoby Jones

Uniform
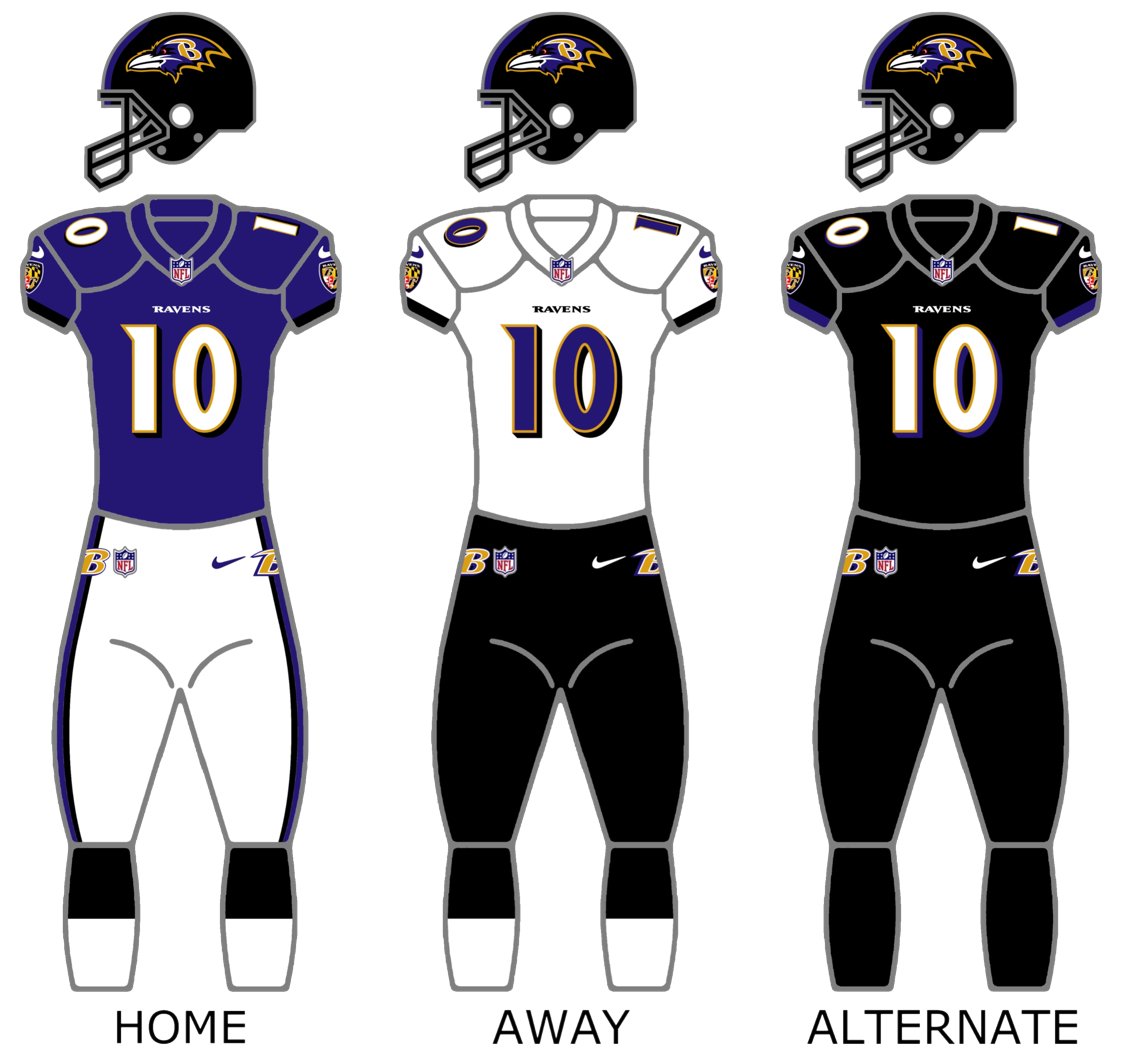

The 2012 season was the Baltimore Ravens' 17th in the National Football League (NFL). While the Ravens failed to improve on their 12–4 record from 2011, they still managed to clinch the AFC North division title in Week 16 and finish the regular season with a 10–6 record, sending them to their fifth straight playoffs, where they advanced to the AFC Championship Game for the second consecutive season and third time in five years, and then to the Super Bowl for the first time since 2000. They won their second Super Bowl, 34–31 against the San Francisco 49ers. It was the first time in franchise history that the Ravens won consecutive division titles. This marks head coach John Harbaugh's fifth season as the head coach of the franchise and fifth consecutive post-season appearance. The Ravens played their home games at M&T Bank Stadium.

The Ravens dedicated their season to former owner and founder Art Modell, who died on September 6, 2012. On Week 1, all team members wore an "Art" decal on their helmets, and for the rest of their season, they wore an "Art" patch on the left side of their jerseys.

Ray Lewis, the last remaining member of the original Ravens roster from 1996 and the 2000 Super Bowl championship team, announced just after the regular season finale before the playoffs that he would be retiring after the conclusion of the season. Following three playoff matchups including a thrilling 38–35 double OT victory against the top-seeded Denver Broncos, his final game was a victory in Super Bowl XLVII. Lewis is believed by many to be the greatest Raven of all time and previously led the Ravens to Super Bowl XXXV in what was just their first playoff appearance in franchise history.

The last player from the Ravens' 2012 Super Bowl-winning team on the roster, Justin Tucker, was released on May 5, 2025.

== Offseason ==
=== Roster changes ===
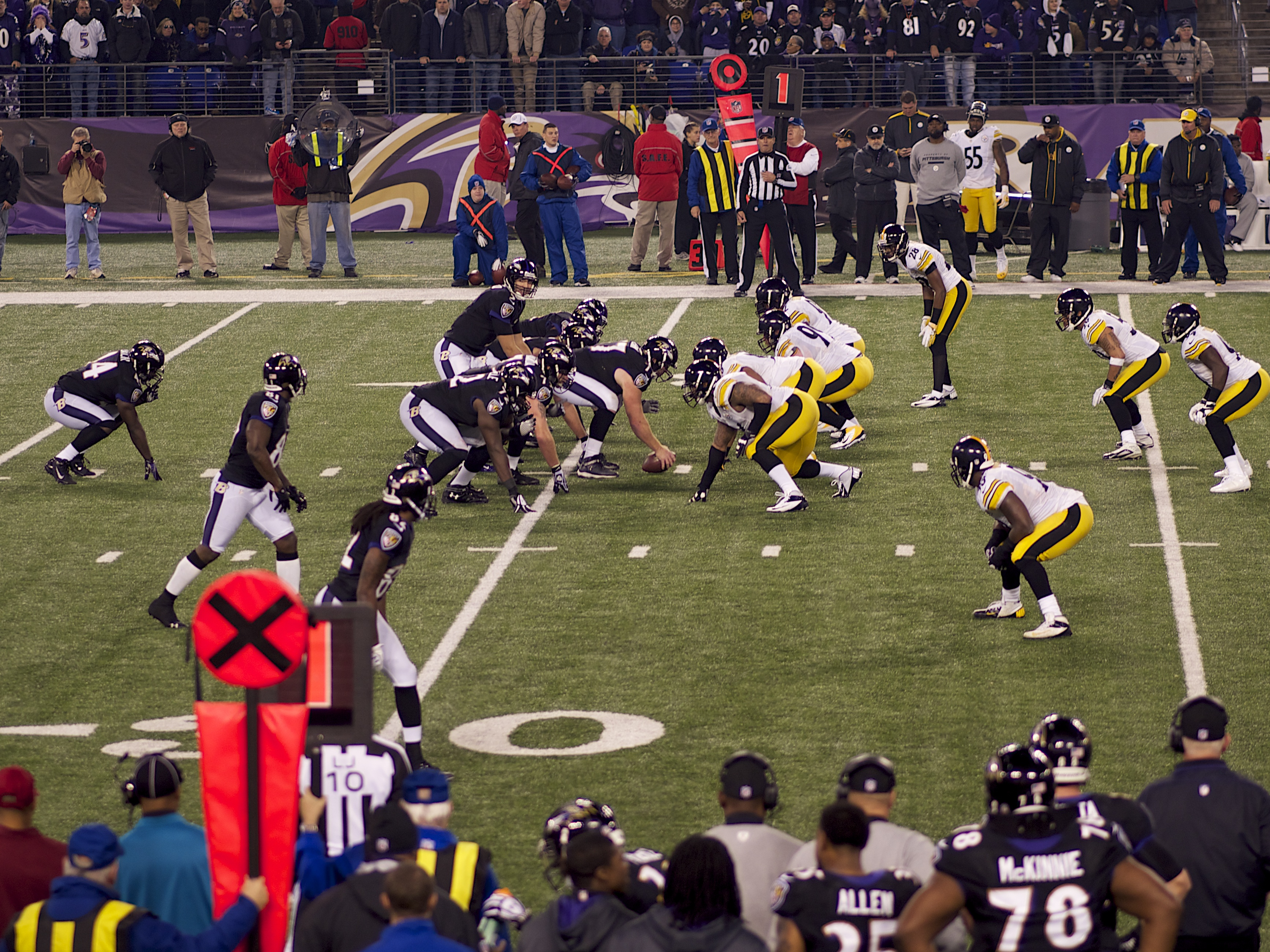
Against Pittsburgh on December 2

- Additions: S Sean Considine, CB Corey Graham, WR Jacoby Jones, DT Ryan McBean, DT Ma'ake Kemoeatu, S James Ihedigbo
- Losses: OLB Jarret Johnson, DE Cory Redding, G Ben Grubbs, S Haruki Nakamura, S Tom Zbikowski, DT Brandon McKinney
- Re-signed Players: ILB Jameel McClain, ILB Brendon Ayanbadejo, RB Ray Rice (franchised), CB Lardarius Webb
- Releases: CB Domonique Foxworth, CB Chris Carr, WR Lee Evans, K Billy Cundiff

=== 2012 draft class ===
2012 Baltimore Ravens draft
Round	Pick	Player	Position	College	Notes
2	35	Courtney Upshaw	LB	Alabama	
2	60	Kelechi Osemele *	G	Iowa State	
3	84	Bernard Pierce	RB	Temple	
4	98	Gino Gradkowski	C	Delaware	
4	130	Christian Thompson	S	South Carolina State	
5	169	Asa Jackson	CB	Cal Poly	
6	198	Tommy Streeter	WR	Miami (FL)	
7	236	DeAngelo Tyson	DE	Georgia	
Made roster † Pro Football Hall of Fame * Made at least one Pro Bowl during career

Notes

- ^{^[a]} The team traded its first-round selection (#29) to the Minnesota Vikings in exchange for the #35 overall selection in the second round, as well as the Vikings' fourth-round selection (#98 overall).
- ^{^[b]} The team traded up from its original third-round selection (#91 overall) to the #84 overall selection, also giving the Atlanta Falcons their fifth-round pick (#164 overall).
- ^{^[c]} The team traded its original fourth-round selection (#124 overall) to the Buffalo Bills in exchange for wide receiver Lee Evans.
- ^{^[d]} Compensatory selection.

== Personnel ==
=== Staff ===
2012 Baltimore Ravens staff
Front office: Owner – Steve Bisciotti; President – Dick Cass; general manager/Executive Vice President – Ozzie Newsome; Assistant general manager – Eric DeCosta; Vice president of football administration – Pat Moriarty; Director of pro personnel – Vince Newsome; Director of college scouting – Joe Hortiz; Senior personnel assistant – George Kokinis; Assistant director of pro personnel – Chad Alexander; Head coaches: Head coach – John Harbaugh; Assistant to the head coach – Dan Parsons; Offensive coaches: Offensive coordinator – Cam Cameron; Interim offensive coordinator/quarterbacks – Jim Caldwell; Running backs – Wilbert Montgomery; Wide receivers – Jim Hostler; Tight ends – Wade Harman; Offensive line – Andy Moeller; Assistant offensive line – Todd Washington; Senior offensive assistant – Craig Ver Steeg; Offensive quality control – Jason Brooks	Defensive coaches: Defensive coordinator – Dean Pees; Defensive line – Clarence Brooks; Linebackers – Ted Monachino; Inside linebackers – Don Martindale; Secondary – Teryl Austin; Defensive quality control – Matt Weiss; Defensive coaching assistant – Drew Wilkins; Special teams coaches: Associate head coach/special teams coordinator – Jerry Rosburg; Assistant special teams – Chris Hewitt; Kicking consultant – Randy Brown; Strength and conditioning: Strength and conditioning – Bob Rogucki; Assistant strength and conditioning – Juney Barnett; Assistant athletic trainer – Kevin Domboski; Assistant athletic trainer – Ron Medlin

=== Final roster ===
"Source". Archived from the original on January 23, 2013.

2012 Baltimore Ravens roster
Quarterbacks (QB): 5 Joe Flacco; 2 Tyrod Taylor; Running backs (RB): 35 Anthony Allen; 44 Vonta Leach FB; 30 Bernard Pierce; 27 Ray Rice; Wide receivers (WR): 81 Anquan Boldin; 17 Tandon Doss; 12 Jacoby Jones RS; 16 David Reed; 82 Torrey Smith; 83 Deonte Thompson; Tight ends (TE): 86 Billy Bajema; 84 Ed Dickson; 88 Dennis Pitta	Offensive linemen (OL): 77 Matt Birk C; 66 Gino Gradkowski C; 70 Ramon Harewood G; 78 Bryant McKinnie T; 74 Michael Oher T; 72 Kelechi Osemele T; 76 Jah Reid G; 63 Bobbie Williams G; 73 Marshal Yanda G; Defensive linemen (DL): 62 Terrence Cody NT; 95 Bryan Hall DE; 97 Arthur Jones DE; 96 Maʻake Kemoeatu NT; 90 Pernell McPhee DE; 92 Haloti Ngata DE; 93 DeAngelo Tyson DE	Linebackers (LB): 51 Brendon Ayanbadejo ILB; 56 Josh Bynes ILB; 59 Dannell Ellerbe ILB; 54 Adrian Hamilton OLB; 99 Paul Kruger OLB; 52 Ray Lewis MLB; 50 Albert McClellan OLB; 55 Terrell Suggs OLB; 91 Courtney Upshaw OLB; Defensive backs (DB): 23 Chykie Brown CB; 38 Omar Brown FS; 37 Sean Considine FS; 24 Corey Graham CB; 32 James Ihedigbo SS; 39 Chris Johnson CB; 31 Bernard Pollard SS; 20 Ed Reed FS; 22 Jimmy Smith CB; 29 Cary Williams CB; Special teams (ST): 46 Morgan Cox LS; 4 Sam Koch P; 9 Justin Tucker K	Practice squad: 49 D. J. Bryant LB; 42 Nigel Carr LB; 69 Jack Cornell G; 10 Dennis Dixon QB; 94 Sergio Kindle LB; 60 Antoine McClain G; 45 Lonyae Miller RB; 48 Alex Silvestro TE; Reserve: 28 Damien Berry RB (IR); 47 Ricky Brown ILB (IR); 26 Emanuel Cook SS (IR); 25 Asa Jackson CB (Susp.); 41 Anthony Levine FS (IR); 58 Mike McAdoo OLB (IR); 98 Ryan McBean NT (IR); 53 Jameel McClain ILB (IR); 34 Bobby Rainey RB (IR); 11 Tommy Streeter WR (IR); 33 Christian Thompson SS (IR); 21 Lardarius Webb CB (IR); 15 LaQuan Williams WR (IR); Rookies in italics 53 active, 13 reserve, 8 practice squad

== Schedule ==
=== Preseason ===
Week	Date	Opponent	Result	Record	Venue	Recap
1	August 9	at Atlanta Falcons	**W** 31–17	1–0	Georgia Dome	Recap
2	August 17	Detroit Lions	**L** 12–27	1–1	M&T Bank Stadium	Recap
3	August 23	Jacksonville Jaguars	**W** 48–17	2–1	M&T Bank Stadium	Recap
4	August 30	at St. Louis Rams	**L** 17–31	2–2	Edward Jones Dome	Recap

=== Regular season ===
Week	Date	Opponent	Result	Record	Venue	Recap
1	September 10	**Cincinnati Bengals**	**W** 44–13	1–0	M&T Bank Stadium	Recap
2	September 16	at Philadelphia Eagles	**L** 23–24	1–1	Lincoln Financial Field	Recap
3	September 23	New England Patriots	**W** 31–30	2–1	M&T Bank Stadium	Recap
4	September 27	**Cleveland Browns**	**W** 23–16	3–1	M&T Bank Stadium	Recap
5	October 7	at Kansas City Chiefs	**W** 9–6	4–1	Arrowhead Stadium	Recap
6	October 14	Dallas Cowboys	**W** 31–29	5–1	M&T Bank Stadium	Recap
7	October 21	at Houston Texans	**L** 13–43	5–2	Reliant Stadium	Recap
8	Bye					
9	November 4	at **Cleveland Browns**	**W** 25–15	6–2	Cleveland Browns Stadium	Recap
10	November 11	Oakland Raiders	**W** 55–20	7–2	M&T Bank Stadium	Recap
11	November 18	at **Pittsburgh Steelers**	**W** 13–10	8–2	Heinz Field	Recap
12	November 25	at San Diego Chargers	**W** 16–13 (OT)	9–2	Qualcomm Stadium	Recap
13	December 2	**Pittsburgh Steelers**	**L** 20–23	9–3	M&T Bank Stadium	Recap
14	December 9	at Washington Redskins	**L** 28–31 (OT)	9–4	FedExField	Recap
15	December 16	Denver Broncos	**L** 17–34	9–5	M&T Bank Stadium	Recap
16	December 23	New York Giants	**W** 33–14	10–5	M&T Bank Stadium	Recap
17	December 30	at **Cincinnati Bengals**	**L** 17–23	10–6	Paul Brown Stadium	Recap

Note: Intra-division opponents are in bold text.

== Game summaries ==
=== Regular season ===
==== Week 1: vs. Cincinnati Bengals ====
Week One: Cincinnati Bengals at Baltimore Ravens – Game summary

Quarter	1	2	3	4	Total
Bengals	0	10	3	0	13
Ravens	10	7	17	10	44

at M&T Bank Stadium, Baltimore, Maryland

- Game time: 7:00 p.m. EDT
- Game weather: 74 °F (23 °C), clear
- Game attendance: 71,064
- Referee: Matt Nicks
- TV announcers (ESPN): Mike Tirico, Jon Gruden and Lisa Salters

Game information

First quarter

- BAL – Justin Tucker 46-yard field goal, 12:53 (BAL 3–0)
- BAL – Ray Rice 7-yard run, Justin Tucker XP good, 6:03 (BAL 10–0)

Second quarter

- CIN – Mike Nugent 34-yard field goal, 14:52 (BAL 10–3)
- BAL – Anquan Boldin 34-yard pass from Joe Flacco, Justin Tucker XP good, 12:25 (BAL 17–3)
- CIN – BenJarvus Green-Ellis 6-yard run, Mike Nugent XP good, 00:18 (BAL 17–10)

Third quarter

- CIN – Mike Nugent 19-yard field goal, 08:59 (BAL 17–13)
- BAL – Dennis Pitta 10-yard pass from Joe Flacco, Justin Tucker XP good, 05:18 (BAL 24–13)
- BAL – Justin Tucker 40-yard field goal, 01:13 (BAL 27–13)
- BAL – Ed Reed intercepted Andy Dalton for 34 yards, Justin Tucker XP good, 00:13 (BAL 34–13)

Fourth quarter

- BAL – Ray Rice 1-yard run, Justin Tucker XP good, 03:03 (BAL 41–13)
- BAL – Justin Tucker 39-yard field goal, 12:53 (BAL 44–13)

Top passers

- CIN – Andy Dalton (22–37, 221 yards, INT)
- BAL – Joe Flacco (35–39, 399 yards, 2 TD)

Top rushers

- CIN – BenJarvus Green-Ellis (18 rushes, 91 yards, TD)
- BAL – Ray Rice (10 rushes, 68 yards, 2 TD)

Top receivers

- CIN – Andrew Hawkins (8 rec, 86 yards)
- BAL – Dennis Pitta (5 rec, 73 yards, TD)

The Ravens started their season at home against the Bengals. They jumped out to a 3–0 lead in the first quarter with Justin Tucker's 46-yard field goal. This was followed up by Ray Rice's 7-yard run to make the score 10–0. The Bengals got on the board in the 2nd quarter with Mike Nugent's 34-yard field goal to shorten the lead to 10–3. However, the Ravens were able to pull away as Joe Flacco found Anquan Boldin on a 34-yard touchdown pass to move ahead 17–3. The Bengals responded coming within 7 when Benjarvus Green-Ellis ran for a 6-yard touchdown making the score 17–10 at halftime. In the 3rd quarter, the Bengals were able to get within 4 points with Nugent kicking a 19-yard field goal shortening the Ravens' lead to 4 17–13. However, the Ravens overpowered the Bengals scoring 27 unanswered points as Flacco found Dennis Pitta on a 10-yard pass to move ahead 24–13 followed up by Tucker scoring a 40-yard field goal moving them ahead 27–13. This was followed by an Ed Reed interception that was returned 34 yards for a touchdown moving the team ahead 34–13. In the 4th quarter, the Ravens scored again off of Rice's 1-yard run for a 41–13 lead and finished the game off of Tucker's 39-yard field goal to make the final score 44–13.

Ed Reed returned an interception for a 34-yard touchdown, making Reed the all-time leader in career interception return yards with 1,497. The previous record of 1,483 yards was held by Rod Woodson.

==== Week 2: at Philadelphia Eagles ====
Week Two: Baltimore Ravens at Philadelphia Eagles – Game summary

Quarter	1	2	3	4	Total
Ravens	7	10	0	6	23
Eagles	7	0	10	7	24

at Lincoln Financial Field, Philadelphia, Pennsylvania

- Date: September 16
- Game time: 1:00 pm. EDT
- Game weather: 72 °F (22 °C), sunny
- Game attendance: 69,144
- Referee: Robert Frazer
- TV announcers (CBS): Greg Gumbel and Dan Dierdorf

Game information

First quarter

- PHI – LeSean McCoy 1-yard run, Alex Henery XP good, 5:43 (PHI 7–0)
- BAL – Vonta Leach 5-yard run, Justin Tucker XP good, 2:12 (Tied 7–7)

Second quarter

- BAL – Jacoby Jones 21-yard pass from Joe Flacco, Justin Tucker XP good, 8:38 (BAL 14–7)
- BAL – Justin Tucker 56-yard field goal, 0:04 (BAL 17–7)

Third quarter

- PHI – Jeremy Maclin 23-yard pass from Michael Vick, Alex Henery XP good, 10:46 (BAL 17–14)
- PHI – Alex Henery 23-yard field goal, 5:33 (Tied 17–17)

Fourth quarter

- BAL – Justin Tucker 51-yard field goal, 11:33 (BAL 20–17)
- BAL – Justin Tucker 48-yard field goal, 4:48 (BAL 23–17)
- PHI – Michael Vick 1-yard run, Alex Henery XP good, 1:57 (PHI 24–23)

Top passers

- BAL – Joe Flacco (22–42, 232 yards, TD, INT)
- PHI – Michael Vick (23–32, 371 yards, TD, 2 INT)

Top rushers

- BAL – Ray Rice (16 rushes, 99 yards)
- PHI – LeSean McCoy (25 rushes, 81 yards, TD)

Top receivers

- BAL – Dennis Pitta (8 rec, 65 yards)
- PHI – Brent Celek (8 rec, 157 yards)

For the first time in 5 years, head coach John Harbaugh made his first return to Philadelphia, where he served as the Eagles' special teams coordinator and defensive backs from 1998 to 2007, and was also part of the 2004 Eagles that made Super Bowl XXXIX. Baltimore took the lead in the second quarter and held it for most of the game, but with 1:57 remaining in the fourth quarter Michael Vick ran for a one-yard touchdown. With the surprising loss, the Ravens fell to 1–1.

==== Week 3: vs. New England Patriots ====
Week Three: New England Patriots at Baltimore Ravens – Game summary

Quarter	1	2	3	4	Total
Patriots	13	7	7	3	30
Ravens	0	14	7	10	31

at M&T Bank Stadium, Baltimore, Maryland

- Date: September 23
- Game time: 8:20 pm. EDT
- Game weather: 67 °F (19 °C), partly cloudy
- Game attendance: 71,269
- Referee: Bruce Hermansen
- TV announcers (NBC): Al Michaels, Cris Collinsworth and Michele Tafoya

Game information

First quarter

- NE – Stephen Gostkowski 37-yard field goal, 7:52 (NE 3–0)
- NE – Brandon Bolden 2-yard run, Stephen Gostkowski XP good, 7:14 (NE 10–0)
- NE – Stephen Gostkowski 49-yard field goal, 1:22 (NE 13–0)

Second quarter

- BAL – Torrey Smith 25-yard pass from Joe Flacco, Justin Tucker XP good, 9:53 (NE 13–7)
- BAL – Dennis Pitta 20-yard pass from Joe Flacco, Justin Tucker XP good, 1:53 (BAL 14–13)
- NE – Julian Edelman 7-yard pass from Tom Brady, Stephen Gostkowski XP good, 0:07 (NE 20–14)

Third quarter

- BAL – Ray Rice 7-yard run, Justin Tucker XP good, 11:42 (BAL 21–20)
- NE – Danny Woodhead 3-yard run, Stephen Gostkowski XP good, 6:52 (NE 27–21)

Fourth quarter

- NE – Stephen Gostkowski 20-yard field goal, 14:19 (NE 30–21)
- BAL – Torrey Smith 5-yard pass from Joe Flacco, Justin Tucker XP good, 4:08 (NE 30–28)
- BAL – Justin Tucker 27-yard field goal, 0:02 (BAL 31–30)

Top passers

- NE – Tom Brady (28–41, 335 yards, TD)
- BAL – Joe Flacco (28–39, 382 yards, 3 TD, INT)

Top rushers

- NE – Stevan Ridley (13 rushes, 37 yards)
- BAL – Ray Rice (20 rushes, 101 yards, TD)

Top receivers

- NE – Wes Welker (8 rec, 142 yards)
- BAL – Torrey Smith (6 rec, 127 yards, 2 TD)

This game was played in the shadow of the death of wide receiver Torrey Smith's brother, who had died in a motorcycle crash the night before. The Ravens entered the game hoping to be able to avenge the AFC Championship loss of the previous season, which came at the hands of the Patriots. New England started off fast as they drew to a 13–0 lead in the first quarter. However Baltimore scored 2 straight touchdowns to take the lead with 1:47 left to go in the half. Then Brady scored a touchdown right at the end of the half to retake the lead 20–14. The second half started off with a touchdown run by Ray Rice to put the Ravens on top 21–20. Then the Patriots retook the lead when Tom Brady scored a touchdown. After that the Baltimore defense began to step it up and held the Pats to a field goal. Then the momentum shifted as Baltimore scored a touchdown (Flacco to Torrey Smith). After forcing a Patriots punt, the Ravens drove down the field to score a field goal as time expired to win the game 31–30.

The Ravens avenged the AFC Championship loss and improved to 2–1 and continued their unbeaten record at home from the previous year along with continuing their streak of winning after a loss.

Based on Torrey Smith's performance through personal hardship, this game was ranked #9 on NFL.com's Top 20 NFL Games of 2012 as Showing Up. Smith finishes with six receptions for 127 yards and two touchdowns.

This game was also remembered for two controversial incidents. Late in the fourth quarter, with New England leading 30–28, coach John Harbaugh was penalized for unsportsmanlike conduct for coming out onto the field, which by NFL rules, is prohibited. However, Harbaugh was claiming that he was trying to only call a timeout to save time for his team. Since the NFL was using replacement refs at the time, and not the original refs, this was another controversial incident involving the former. The penalty resulted in an irate Ravens crowd chanting "Bullshit" three separate times in just over a minute during the Patriots last drive, which was picked up by NBC microphones and was clearly audible (and not censored) during the broadcast, which led to play-by-play announcer Al Michaels saying, "That's the loudest manure chant I've ever heard".

Tucker's game-winning field goal also led to controversy. The ball, after it had been kicked, sailed over the top of the right upright. It was ruled "good", giving Baltimore the win. However, clear replays show that the ball was extremely close to sailing wide of the upright. This led to the Patriots sideline going crazy over the call, with defensive lineman Vince Wilfork taking his helmet off in disgust. Since field goals that sail over the uprights are not reviewable (field goals that go between the uprights can be reviewed, although it's very uncommon), the play could not be reviewed. Patriots coach Bill Belichick, as he was leaving the field, angrily grabbed one of the officials, resulting in him being fined $50,000 by the NFL. Belichick later admitted that he didn't know field goals were not subject to review.

==== Week 4: vs. Cleveland Browns ====
Week Four: Cleveland Browns at Baltimore Ravens – Game summary

Quarter	1	2	3	4	Total
Browns	0	7	3	6	16
Ravens	0	9	14	0	23

at M&T Bank Stadium, Baltimore, Maryland

- Date: September 27
- Game time: 8:20 pm. EDT
- Game weather: 77 °F (25 °C), cloudy/showers
- Game attendance: 70,944
- Referee: Gene Steratore
- TV announcers (NFLN): Brad Nessler, Mike Mayock and Alex Flanagan

Game information

First quarter

- No scoring plays.

Second quarter

- BAL – Torrey Smith, 18-yard pass from Joe Flacco, two-point conversion attempt failed, 12:57 (BAL 6–0)
- BAL – Justin Tucker, 45-yard field goal, 10:03 (BAL 9–0)
- CLE – Trent Richardson, 1-yard run, Phil Dawson XP good, 2:32 (BAL 9–7)

Third quarter

- BAL – Joe Flacco, 1-yard run, Justin Tucker XP good, 9:53 (BAL 16–7)
- CLE – Phil Dawson, 51-yard field goal, 6:52 (BAL 16–10)
- BAL – Cary Williams, 63-yard interception return, 0:15 (BAL 23–10)

Fourth quarter

- CLE – Phil Dawson, 50-yard field goal, 12:11 (BAL 23–13)
- CLE – Phil Dawson, 52-yard field goal, 4:33 (BAL 23–16)

Top passers

- CLE – Brandon Weeden (25–52, 320 yards, INT)
- BAL – Joe Flacco (28–46, 356 yards, TD, INT)

Top rushers

- CLE – Trent Richardson (14 rushes, 47 yards, TD)
- BAL – Ray Rice (18 rushes, 49 yards)

Top receivers

- CLE – Greg Little (4 rec, 77 yards)
- BAL – Anquan Boldin (9 rec, 131 yards)

After a scoreless first quarter, the Ravens scored first in the second quarter as Joe Flacco found Torrey Smith on an 18-yard touchdown pass (with a failed PAT) for a 6–0 lead. The team increased their lead as Justin Tucker made a 45-yard field goal to make the score 9–0. The Browns scored not long before halftime when Trent Richardson ran for a 2-yard touchdown, making the halftime score 9–7. After the break, the Ravens went right back to work as Flacco threw several completions to Anquan Boldin before scoring on a 1-yard touchdown run for a 16–7 lead. However, The Browns drew within 6 points as Phil Dawson nailed a 51-yard field goal, making the score 16–10. But then, the Ravens pulled away as Cary Williams picked off Weeden and returned the ball 63 yards for a touchdown, making the score 23–10. In the fourth quarter, the Browns tried to come back as Dawson nailed two field goals from 50 and 52 yards out making the score 23–13 and then 23–16, respectively. However, they were unable to tie the game on their last drive with the game ending on a Brandon Weeden Hail Mary pass from the Baltimore 18-yard line, which was thrown too far and went out the back of the endzone. With their ninth straight win over the Browns, the Ravens improved to 3–1. The game was also the first of the NFL season to use NFL referees and not replacement ones following the officials lockout.

==== Week 5: at Kansas City Chiefs ====
Week Five: Baltimore Ravens at Kansas City Chiefs – Game summary

Quarter	1	2	3	4	Total
Ravens	3	0	6	0	9
Chiefs	0	3	0	3	6

at Arrowhead Stadium, Kansas City, Missouri

- Date: October 7
- Game time: 1:00 pm. EDT/12:00 p.m. CDT
- Game weather: 47 °F (8 °C), sunny
- Game attendance: 68,803
- Referee: Pete Morelli
- TV announcers (CBS): Ian Eagle and Dan Fouts

Game information

First quarter

- BAL – Justin Tucker 28-yard field goal, 1:24 (BAL 3–0)

Second quarter

- KC – Ryan Succop 30-yard field goal, 2:52 (Tied 3–3)

Third quarter

- BAL – Justin Tucker 26-yard field goal, 8:04 (BAL 6–3)
- BAL – Justin Tucker 39-yard field goal, 0:01 (BAL 9–3)

Fourth quarter

- KC – Ryan Succop 31-yard field goal, 4:34 (BAL 9–6)

Top passers

- BAL – Joe Flacco (13–27, 187 yards, INT)
- KC – Matt Cassel (9–15, 92 yards, 2 INT)

Top rushers

- BAL – Ray Rice (17 rushes, 102 yards)
- KC – Jamaal Charles (31 rushes, 140 yards)

Top receivers

- BAL – Anquan Boldin (4 rec, 82 yards)
- KC – Dwayne Bowe (6 rec, 60 yards)

The Ravens improved to 4–1 by winning a game that included six turnovers, four by Kansas City, and five total field goals by both teams. With the Bengals' loss to the Dolphins the Ravens moved into first place in the AFC North.

==== Week 6: vs. Dallas Cowboys ====
Week Six: Dallas Cowboys at Baltimore Ravens – Game summary

Quarter	1	2	3	4	Total
Cowboys	7	3	10	9	29
Ravens	3	14	7	7	31

at M&T Bank Stadium, Baltimore, Maryland

- Date: October 14
- Game time: 1:00 pm. EDT
- Game weather: 69 °F (21 °C), partly cloudy
- Game attendance: 71,384
- Referee: Mike Carey
- TV announcers (Fox): Thom Brennaman, Brian Billick and Laura Okmin

Game information

First quarter

- BAL – Justin Tucker 38-yard field goal, 7:54 (BAL 3–0)
- DAL – Felix Jones 22-yard run, Dan Bailey XP good, 3:26 (DAL 7–3)

Second quarter

- DAL – Dan Bailey 42-yard field goal, 11:33 (DAL 10–3)
- BAL – Ray Rice 1-yard run, Justin Tucker XP good, 7:33 (Tied 10–10)
- BAL – Torrey Smith 19-yard pass from Joe Flacco, Justin Tucker XP good, 1:05 (BAL 17–10)

Third quarter

- DAL – Dan Bailey 43-yard field goal, 11:42 (BAL 17–13)
- BAL – Jacoby Jones 108-yard kickoff return, Justin Tucker XP good, 11:37 (BAL 24–13)
- DAL – Dez Bryant 7-yard pass from Tony Romo, Dan Bailey XP good, 3:24 (BAL 24–20)

Fourth quarter

- DAL – Dan Bailey 34-yard field goal, 8:26 (BAL 24–23)
- BAL – Ray Rice 1-yard run, Justin Tucker XP good, 4:49 (BAL 31–23)
- DAL – Dez Bryant 4-yard pass from Tony Romo, two-point conversion attempt failed, 0:36 (BAL 31–29)

Top passers

- DAL – Tony Romo (25–36, 261 yards, 2 TD, INT)
- BAL – Joe Flacco (17–26, 234 yards, TD)

Top rushers

- DAL – DeMarco Murray (14 rushes, 93 yards)
- BAL – Ray Rice (16 rushes, 63 yards, 2 TD)

Top receivers

- DAL – Dez Bryant (13 rec, 95 yards, 2 TD)
- BAL – Anquan Boldin (5 rec, 98 yards)

The Ravens survived a wild back and forth game in which they nearly lost an eight point lead in the final 45 seconds of the game. Following a Dallas touchdown and a failed two-point conversion with 0:36 left in the game, the Cowboys recovered the onside kick and got into field goal after a pass interference call on Chykie Brown put the ball in Baltimore territory. However, Cowboys kicker Dan Bailey missed a 51-yard field goal wide left with 0:02 left, preserving the win for Baltimore. With their fourth straight win, the Ravens improved to 5–1, and became 4–0 all-time against the Cowboys. This was also their 14th straight regular season home win.

However, Baltimore also lost Ray Lewis to a potentially season-ending triceps injury and Lardarius Webb with a season-ending ACL injury.

==== Week 7: at Houston Texans ====
Week Seven: Baltimore Ravens at Houston Texans – Game summary

Quarter	1	2	3	4	Total
Ravens	3	0	7	3	13
Texans	9	20	7	7	43

at Reliant Stadium, Houston, Texas

- Date: October 21
- Game time: 1:00 pm. EDT/12:00 pm. CDT
- Game weather: Played indoors (retractable roof closed)
- Game attendance: 71,708
- Referee: Tony Corrente
- TV announcers (CBS): Greg Gumbel and Dan Dierdorf

Game information

First quarter

- BAL – Justin Tucker 51-yard field goal, 11:01 (BAL 3–0)
- HOU – Joe Flacco sacked in end zone by Connor Barwin for a Safety, 4:54 (BAL 3–2)
- HOU – Kevin Walter 25-yard pass from Matt Schaub, Shayne Graham XP good, 0:36 (HOU 9–3)

Second quarter

- HOU – Johnathan Joseph 52-yard interception return, Shayne Graham XP good, 15:00 (HOU 16–3)
- HOU – Owen Daniels 1-yard pass from Matt Schaub, Shayne Graham XP good, 6:03 (HOU 23–3)
- HOU – Shayne Graham 33-yard field goal, 2:00 (HOU 26–3)
- HOU – Shayne Graham 29-yard field goal, 0:06 (HOU 29–3)

Third quarter

- BAL – Tandon Doss 15-yard pass from Joe Flacco, Justin Tucker XP good, 10:42 (HOU 29–10)
- HOU – Arian Foster 1-yard run, Shayne Graham XP good, 3:00 (HOU 36–10)

Fourth quarter

- BAL – Justin Tucker 54-yard field goal, 12:28 (HOU 36–13)
- HOU – Arian Foster 2-yard run, Shayne Graham XP good, 8:54 (HOU 43–13)

Top passers

- BAL – Joe Flacco (21–43, 147 yards, TD, 2 INT)
- HOU – Matt Schaub (23–37, 256 yards, 2 TD)

Top rushers

- BAL – Ray Rice (9 rushes, 42 yards)
- HOU – Arian Foster (19 rushes, 98 yards, 2 TD)

Top receivers

- BAL – Torrey Smith (4 rec, 41 yards)
- HOU – Andre Johnson (9 rec, 86 yards)

Days before the game, the team was fined $20,000 for not adding Ed Reed to the injury report.

The Ravens drew first blood as Justin Tucker nailed a 51-yard field goal, but Connor Barwin sacked Joe Flacco in the end zone for a safety that started a string of 29 unanswered Houston points. Matt Schaub found Kevin Walter in the end zone on a 25-yard touchdown pass to take a 9–3 lead, and the Texans added on in the 2nd quarter with Johnathan Joseph returning an interception 52 yards for a touchdown. Schaub's one-yard pass to Owen Daniels and a pair of Shayne Graham field goals put the hosts up 29–3 at halftime. The Ravens got right back to work in the 3rd quarter as Flacco connected with Tandon Doss on a 15-yard touchdown pass to cut the lead to 29–10, but the Texans pulled away as Arian Foster ran for two short scores, which were separated by a 54-yard Tucker field goal early in the fourth quarter.

It was the Ravens' first loss to the Texans in franchise history, and their first loss to a Houston NFL team since their inaugural 1996 season when they lost twice to the Oilers. The Ravens headed into their bye week 5–2 while also dropping their record to 5–1 against the Texans in the regular season and 6–1 against them overall.

==== Week 9: at Cleveland Browns ====
Week Nine: Baltimore Ravens at Cleveland Browns – Game summary

Quarter	1	2	3	4	Total
Ravens	14	0	0	11	25
Browns	0	9	3	3	15

at Cleveland Browns Stadium, Cleveland, Ohio

- Date: November 4
- Game time: 1:00 pm. EST
- Game weather: 39 °F (4 °C), cloudy
- Game attendance: 65,449
- Referee: Jeff Triplette
- TV announcers (CBS): Marv Albert and Rich Gannon

Game information

First quarter

- BAL – Ray Rice, 8-yard run, Justin Tucker XP good, 8:37 (BAL 7–0)
- BAL – Bernard Pierce, 12-yard run, Justin Tucker XP good, 0:08 (BAL 14–0)

Second quarter

- CLE – Phil Dawson, 32-yard field goal, 9:22 (BAL 14–3)
- CLE – Phil Dawson, 28-yard field goal, 1:47 (BAL 14–6)
- CLE – Phil Dawson, 29-yard field goal, 0:05 (BAL 14–9)

Third quarter

- CLE – Phil Dawson, 33-yard field goal, 2:42 (BAL 14–12)

Fourth quarter

- CLE – Phil Dawson, 41-yard field goal, 8:50 (CLE 15–14)
- BAL – Torrey Smith, 19-yard pass from Joe Flacco, Joe Flacco pass to Anquan Boldin for two-point conversion, 4:33 (BAL 22–15)
- BAL – Justin Tucker, 43-yard field goal, 2:53 (BAL 25–15)

Top passers

- BAL – Joe Flacco (15–24, 153 yards, TD)
- CLE – Brandon Weeden (20–37, 176 yards, 2 INT)

Top rushers

- BAL – Ray Rice (25 rushes, 98 yards, TD)
- CLE – Trent Richardson (25 rushes, 105 yards)

Top receivers

- BAL – Anquan Boldin (5 rec, 57 yards)
- CLE – Greg Little (5 rec, 52 yards)

The Ravens broke out of a two quarter offensive slump, scoring 11 points in the final five minutes of the 4th quarter to complete a season sweep of the Browns for the fifth straight season. By winning their tenth straight game against the Browns, the Ravens improved to 6–2.

==== Week 10: vs. Oakland Raiders ====
Week Ten: Oakland Raiders at Baltimore Ravens – Game summary

Quarter	1	2	3	4	Total
Raiders	0	10	7	3	20
Ravens	10	17	21	7	55

at M&T Bank Stadium, Baltimore, Maryland

- Date: November 11
- Game time: 1:00 pm. EST
- Game weather: 61 °F (16 °C), sunny
- Game attendance: 71,339
- Referee: Ron Winter
- TV announcers (CBS): Greg Gumbel and Dan Dierdorf

Game information

First quarter

- BAL – Justin Tucker 48-yard field goal, 8:55 (BAL 3–0)
- BAL – Joe Flacco 1-yard run, Justin Tucker XP good, 3:18 (BAL 10–0)

Second quarter

- OAK – Sebastian Janikowski 32-yard field goal, 10:05 (BAL 10–3)
- BAL – Dennis Pitta 5-yard pass from Joe Flacco, Justin Tucker XP good, 7:55 (BAL 17–3)
- BAL – Justin Tucker 34-yard field goal, 3:20 (BAL 20–3)
- OAK – Darrius Heyward-Bey 55-yard pass from Carson Palmer, Sebastian Janikowski XP good, 1:46 (BAL 20–10)
- BAL – Ray Rice 7-yard run, Justin Tucker XP good, 0:27 (BAL 27–10)

Third quarter

- BAL – Torrey Smith 47-yard pass from Joe Flacco, Justin Tucker XP good, 13:49 (BAL 34–10)
- OAK – Denarius Moore 30-yard pass from Carson Palmer, Sebastian Janikowski XP good, 10:37 (BAL 34–17)
- BAL – Torrey Smith 20-yard pass from Joe Flacco, Justin Tucker XP good, 9:27 (BAL 41–17)
- BAL – Sam Koch 7-yard run, Justin Tucker XP good, 5:44 (BAL 48–17)

Fourth quarter

- OAK – Sebastian Janikowski 47-yard field goal, 12:58 (BAL 48–20)
- BAL – Jacoby Jones 105-yard kickoff return, Justin Tucker XP good, 12:47 (BAL 55–20)

Top passers

- OAK – Carson Palmer (29–45, 368 yards, 2 TD, INT)
- BAL – Joe Flacco (21–33, 341 yards, 3 TD, INT)

Top rushers

- OAK – Marcel Reece (13 rushes, 48 yards)
- BAL – Ray Rice (13 rushes, 35 yards, TD)

Top receivers

- OAK – Denarius Moore (4 rec, 90 yards, TD)
- BAL – Dennis Pitta (5 rec, 67 yards, TD)

The Ravens got their 15th straight home win (16 including playoffs) by defeating the Raiders. Baltimore set a franchise record for points in a game with 55 – improving on the previous record of 48 set against the Detroit Lions on December 13, 2009 – as the team improved to 7–2. (this mark would eventually be surpassed in Week 1 of the 2019 season when the Ravens scored 59 points on the Miami Dolphins). Jacoby Jones returned a kickoff for a 105-yard touchdown, making him the first player in league history to have two career kickoff returns of at least 105 yards. Jones had returned a kickoff 108 yards for a touchdown in Week 6 against the Cowboys.

==== Week 11: at Pittsburgh Steelers ====
Week Eleven: Baltimore Ravens at Pittsburgh Steelers – Game summary

Quarter	1	2	3	4	Total
Ravens	10	0	3	0	13
Steelers	7	0	3	0	10

at Heinz Field, Pittsburgh, Pennsylvania

- Date: November 18
- Game time: 8:20 pm. EST
- Game weather: 46 °F (8 °C), clear
- Game attendance: 63,446
- Referee: Walt Anderson
- TV announcers (NBC): Al Michaels, Cris Collinsworth and Michele Tafoya

Game information

First quarter

- PIT – Byron Leftwich 31-yard run, Shaun Suisham XP good, 14:29 (PIT 7–0)
- BAL – Justin Tucker 26-yard field goal, 8:26 (PIT 7–3)
- BAL – Jacoby Jones 63-yard punt return, Justin Tucker XP good, 3:33 (BAL 10–7)

Second quarter

- No scoring plays.

Third quarter

- BAL – Justin Tucker 39-yard field goal, 6:55 (BAL 13–7)
- PIT – Shaun Suisham 22-yard field goal, 0:37 (BAL 13–10)

Fourth quarter

- No scoring plays.

Top passers

- BAL – Joe Flacco (20–32, 164 yards)
- PIT – Byron Leftwich (18–39, 201 yards, INT)

Top rushers

- BAL – Ray Rice (20 rushes, 40 yards)
- PIT – Jonathan Dwyer (12 rushes, 55 yards)

Top receivers

- BAL – Anquan Boldin (8 rec, 79 yards)
- PIT – Emmanuel Sanders (3 rec, 82 yards)

The Ravens got their third straight win against the Steelers while picking up their 12th-straight regular season division rival win and improved to 8–2.

==== Week 12: at San Diego Chargers ====
Week Twelve: Baltimore Ravens at San Diego Chargers – Game summary

Quarter	1	2	3	4	OT	Total
Ravens	0	0	3	10	3	16
Chargers	0	10	0	3	0	13

at Qualcomm Stadium, San Diego, California

- Date: November 25
- Game time: 4:05 pm. EST/1:05 p.m. PST
- Game weather: 59 °F (15 °C), partly cloudy
- Game attendance: 57,882
- Referee: Gene Steratore
- TV announcers (CBS): Ian Eagle and Dan Fouts

Game information

First quarter

- No scoring plays.

Second quarter

- SD – Malcom Floyd 21-yard pass from Philip Rivers, Nick Novak XP good, 9:48 (SD 7–0)
- SD – Nick Novak 47-yard field goal, 3:08 (SD 10–0)

Third quarter

- BAL – Justin Tucker 43-yard field goal, 12:23 (SD 10–3)

Fourth quarter

- SD – Nick Novak 30-yard field goal, 7:55 (SD 13–3)
- BAL – Dennis Pitta 4-yard pass from Joe Flacco, Justin Tucker XP good, 4:23 (SD 13–10)
- BAL – Justin Tucker 38-yard field goal, 0:03 (Tied 13–13)

Overtime

- BAL – Justin Tucker 38-yard field goal, 1:12 (BAL 16–13)

Top passers

- BAL – Joe Flacco (30–51, 355 yards, TD)
- SD – Philip Rivers (23–36, 228 yards, TD)

Top rushers

- BAL – Ray Rice (22 rushes, 97 yards)
- SD – Ryan Mathews (19 rushes, 72 yards)

Top receivers

- BAL – Torrey Smith (7 rec, 144 yards)
- SD – Danario Alexander (5 rec, 74 yards)

The game went into overtime with a field goal by Tucker. The field goal was set up by conversion of a 4th and 29 play where Joe Flacco completed a short pass to Ray Rice and Rice raced 29 yards on the ground for the first down, which would become the 2012 best play of the year as well as be given the nickname, "Hey Diddle-Diddle". With the surprising win, the Ravens move into 9–2, getting revenge for the previous year's loss in San Diego on Sunday Night Football.

==== Week 13: vs. Pittsburgh Steelers ====
Week Thirteen: Pittsburgh Steelers at Baltimore Ravens – Game summary

Quarter	1	2	3	4	Total
Steelers	3	3	7	10	23
Ravens	0	13	7	0	20

at M&T Bank Stadium, Baltimore, Maryland

- Date: December 2
- Game time: 4:25 pm. EST
- Game weather: 57 °F (14 °C), partly cloudy
- Game attendance: 71,442
- Referee: Alberto Riveron
- TV announcers (CBS): Jim Nantz and Phil Simms

Game information

First quarter

- PIT – Shaun Suisham 46-yard field goal, 7:52 (PIT 3–0)

Second quarter

- BAL – Justin Tucker 45-yard field goal, 13:57 (Tied 3–3)
- BAL – Justin Tucker 23-yard field goal, 9:38 (BAL 6–3)
- BAL – Anquan Boldin 28-yard pass from Joe Flacco, Justin Tucker XP good, 3:23 (BAL 13–3)
- PIT – Shaun Suisham 41-yard field goal, 0:37 (BAL 13–6)

Third quarter

- PIT – Jonathan Dwyer 16-yard run, Shaun Suisham XP good, 11:14 (Tied 13–13)
- BAL – Ray Rice 34-yard run, Justin Tucker XP good, 5:00 (BAL 20–13)

Fourth quarter

- PIT – Heath Miller 7-yard pass from Charlie Batch, Shaun Suisham XP good, 7:37 (Tied 20–20)
- PIT – Shaun Suisham 42-yard field goal, 0:03 (PIT 23–20)

Top passers

- PIT – Charlie Batch (25–36, 276 yards, TD, INT)
- BAL – Joe Flacco (16–34, 188 yards, TD, INT)

Top rushers

- PIT – Jonathan Dwyer (16 rushes, 49 yards, TD)
- BAL – Ray Rice (12 rushes, 78 yards, TD)

Top receivers

- PIT – Heath Miller (5 rec, 97 yards, TD)
- BAL – Anquan Boldin (5 rec, 81 yards, TD)

With third-string quarterback Charlie Batch at the helm, the Steelers handed the Ravens their first home loss since December 5, 2010 and the Ravens fell to 9–3.

==== Week 14: at Washington Redskins ====
Week Fourteen: Baltimore Ravens at Washington Redskins – Game summary

Quarter	1	2	3	4	OT	Total
Ravens	7	14	0	7	0	28
Redskins	14	0	6	8	3	31

at FedExField, Landover, Maryland

- Date: December 9
- Game time: 1:00 pm. EST
- Game weather: 51 °F (11 °C), cloudy
- Game attendance: 81,178
- Referee: John Parry
- TV announcers (CBS): Marv Albert and Rich Gannon

Game information

First quarter

- WAS – Josh Morgan 4-yard pass from Robert Griffin III, Kai Forbath XP good, 9:45 (WAS 7–0)
- BAL – Anquan Boldin 19-yard pass from Joe Flacco, Justin Tucker XP good, 7:12 (Tied 7–7)
- WAS – Alfred Morris 1-yard run, Kai Forbath XP good, 2:59 (WAS 14–7)

Second quarter

- BAL – Anquan Boldin 31-yard pass from Joe Flacco, Justin Tucker XP good, 10:23 (Tied 14–14)
- BAL – Dennis Pitta 14-yard pass from Joe Flacco, Justin Tucker XP good, 8:46 (BAL 21–14)

Third quarter

- WAS – Kai Forbath 48-yard field goal, 10:31 (BAL 21–17)
- WAS – Kai Forbath 49-yard field goal, 1:28 (BAL 21–20)

Fourth quarter

- BAL – Ray Rice 7-yard run, Justin Tucker XP good, 4:52 (BAL 28–20)
- WAS – Pierre Garçon 11-yard pass from Kirk Cousins, Kirk Cousins 2-yard run for two-point conversion, 0:36 (Tied 28–28)

Overtime

- WAS – Kai Forbath 34-yard field goal, 11:47 (WAS 31–28)

Top passers

- BAL – Joe Flacco (16–21, 182 yards, 3 TD, INT)
- WAS – Robert Griffin III (15–26, 246 yards, TD)

Top rushers

- BAL – Ray Rice (20 rushes, 121 yards, TD)
- WAS – Alfred Morris (23 rushes, 122 yards, TD)

Top receivers

- BAL – Anquan Boldin (3 rec, 78 yards, 2 TD)
- WAS – Pierre Garçon (5 rec, 87 yards, TD)

With the loss to the Redskins the Ravens fell to 9–4 and 0–2 on the road against NFC East teams. Also, it was the first consecutive loss for the Ravens since Week 6 of their 2009 season.

The Ravens fired offensive coordinator Cam Cameron the next day, promoting Jim Caldwell to the position.

==== Week 15: vs. Denver Broncos ====
Week Fifteen: Denver Broncos at Baltimore Ravens – Game summary

Quarter	1	2	3	4	Total
Broncos	3	14	14	3	34
Ravens	0	0	3	14	17

at M&T Bank Stadium, Baltimore, Maryland

- Date: December 16
- Game time: 1:00 pm. EST
- Game weather: 53 °F (12 °C), cloudy
- Game attendance: 71,317
- Referee: Pete Morelli
- TV announcers (CBS): Greg Gumbel and Dan Dierdorf

Game information

First quarter

- DEN – Matt Prater 27-yard field goal, 7:16 (DEN 3–0)

Second quarter

- DEN – Jacob Hester 1-yard run, Matt Prater XP good, 11:59 (DEN 10–0)
- DEN – Chris Harris 98-yard interception return, Matt Prater XP good, 0:30 (DEN 17–0)

Third quarter

- BAL – Justin Tucker 45-yard field goal, 12:22 (DEN 17–3)
- DEN – Eric Decker 51-yard pass from Peyton Manning, Matt Prater XP good, 10:02 (DEN 24–3)
- DEN – Knowshon Moreno 6-yard run, Matt Prater XP good, 7:44 (DEN 31–3)

Fourth quarter

- BAL – Dennis Pitta 31-yard pass from Joe Flacco, Justin Tucker XP good, 14:47 (DEN 31–10)
- DEN – Matt Prater 36-yard field goal, 5:16 (DEN 34–10)
- BAL – Dennis Pitta 61-yard pass from Joe Flacco, Justin Tucker XP good, 4:32 (DEN 34–17)

Top passers

- DEN – Peyton Manning (17–28, 204 yards, TD)
- BAL – Joe Flacco (20–40, 254 yards, 2 TD, INT)

Top rushers

- DEN – Knowshon Moreno (22 rushes, 118 yards, TD)
- BAL – Ray Rice (12 rushes, 38 yards)

Top receivers

- DEN – Eric Decker (8 rec, 133 yards, TD)
- BAL – Dennis Pitta (7 rec, 125 yards, 2 TD)

The Ravens were blown out at home, losing their third straight game and falling to 9–5. However, they clinched a playoff berth following the Steelers' loss to the Cowboys later in the evening. The Ravens later rematched and defeated the Broncos in the divisional round of the playoffs in a game known as the Mile High Miracle.

==== Week 16: vs. New York Giants ====
Week Sixteen: New York Giants at Baltimore Ravens – Game summary

Quarter	1	2	3	4	Total
Giants	7	0	0	7	14
Ravens	14	10	3	6	33

at M&T Bank Stadium, Baltimore, Maryland

- Date: December 23
- Game time: 4:25 pm. EST
- Game weather: 51 °F (11 °C), sunny
- Game attendance: 71,470
- Referee: Carl Cheffers
- TV announcers (Fox): Joe Buck, Troy Aikman and Pam Oliver

Game information

First quarter

- BAL – Torrey Smith 6-yard pass from Joe Flacco, Justin Tucker XP good, 7:42 (BAL 7–0)
- BAL – Joe Flacco 1-yard run, Justin Tucker XP good, 4:27 (BAL 14–0)
- NYG – David Wilson 14-yard run, Lawrence Tynes XP good, 1:34 (BAL 14–7)

Second quarter

- BAL – Justin Tucker 23-yard field goal, 6:09 (BAL 17–7)
- BAL – Ray Rice 27-yard pass from Joe Flacco, Justin Tucker XP good, 1:10 (BAL 24–7)

Third quarter

- BAL – Justin Tucker 21-yard field goal, 5:21 (BAL 27–7)

Fourth quarter

- BAL – Justin Tucker 30-yard field goal, 11:12 (BAL 30–7)
- BAL – Justin Tucker 29-yard field goal, 7:30 (BAL 33–7)
- NYG – Domenik Hixon 13-yard pass from Eli Manning, Lawrence Tynes XP good, 3:24 (BAL 33–14)

Top passers

- NYG – Eli Manning (14–28, 150 yards, TD)
- BAL – Joe Flacco (25–36, 309 yards, 2 TD)

Top rushers

- NYG – Ahmad Bradshaw (9 rushes, 39 yards)
- BAL – Bernard Pierce (14 rushes, 123 yards)

Top receivers

- NYG – Rueben Randle (1 rec, 43 yards)
- BAL – Anquan Boldin (7 rec, 93 yards)

The Ravens used a dominant defensive and offensive performance to blow out the Giants. The Ravens led the time of the possession battle 39:21–20:39, had 533 total yards vs. the Giants 186, and went 11-18 on third down. With the win the Ravens not only improved to 10–5 but also clinched the AFC North division title (by having four wins in division games).

==== Week 17: at Cincinnati Bengals ====
Week Seventeen: Baltimore Ravens at Cincinnati Bengals – Game summary

Quarter	1	2	3	4	Total
Ravens	7	0	0	10	17
Bengals	0	7	6	10	23

at Paul Brown Stadium, Cincinnati, Ohio

- Date: December 30
- Game time: 1:00 pm. EST
- Game weather: 26 °F (−3 °C), partly cloudy
- Game attendance: 61,565
- Referee: Ron Winter
- TV announcers (CBS): Kevin Harlan and Solomon Wilcots

Game information

First quarter

- BAL – Anthony Allen 2-yard run, Justin Tucker XP good, 0:22 (BAL 7–0)

Second quarter

- CIN – Marvin Jones 11-yard pass from Andy Dalton, Josh Brown XP good, 0:45 (Tied 7–7)

Third quarter

- CIN – Josh Brown 47-yard field goal, 6:20 (CIN 10–7)
- CIN – Josh Brown 32-yard field goal, 2:29 (CIN 13–7)

Fourth quarter

- BAL – Tyrod Taylor 1-yard run, Justin Tucker XP good, 12:58 (BAL 14–13)
- CIN – Josh Brown 38-yard field goal, 7:20 (CIN 16–14)
- CIN – Carlos Dunlap 14-yard interception return, Josh Brown XP good, 6:13 (CIN 23–14)
- BAL – Justin Tucker 49-yard field goal, 1:26 (CIN 23–17)

Top passers

- BAL – Tyrod Taylor (15–25, 149 yards, INT)
- CIN – Andy Dalton (10–15, 78 yards, TD)

Top rushers

- BAL – Bernard Pierce (22 rushes, 89 yards)
- CIN – Brian Leonard (10 rushes, 34 yards)

Top receivers

- BAL – Ed Dickson (6 rec, 64 yards)
- CIN – Brandon Tate (3 rec, 53 yards)

The Ravens allowed their starters to come out for a few minutes in the first quarter, then played their second-string players for the rest of the game. With the loss to the Bengals, the Ravens finished the season 10–6.

=== Postseason ===
Week	Date	Opponent (Seed)	Result	Record	Game site	Recap
Wild Card	January 6, 2013	Indianapolis Colts (5)	W 24–9	1–0	M&T Bank Stadium	Recap
Divisional	January 12, 2013	at Denver Broncos (1)	W 38–35 (2OT)	2–0	Sports Authority Field at Mile High	Recap
AFC Championship	January 20, 2013	at New England Patriots (2)	W 28–13	3–0	Gillette Stadium	Recap
Super Bowl XLVII	February 3, 2013	vs. San Francisco 49ers (N2)	W 34–31	4–0	Mercedes-Benz Superdome	Recap

==== AFC Wild Card Playoffs: vs. #5 Indianapolis Colts ====
AFC Wild Card Playoffs: #5 Indianapolis Colts at #4 Baltimore Ravens – Game summary

Quarter	1	2	3	4	Total
Colts	0	6	3	0	9
Ravens	0	10	7	7	24

at M&T Bank Stadium, Baltimore, Maryland

- Date: January 6, 2013
- Game time: 1:00 p.m. EST
- Game weather: 49 °F (9 °C), partly cloudy
- Game attendance: 71,379
- Referee: Mike Carey
- TV announcers (CBS): Jim Nantz and Phil Simms

Game information

First quarter

- No scoring plays.

Second quarter

- BAL – Justin Tucker 23-yard field goal, 11:23 (BAL 0–3)
- IND – Adam Vinatieri 47-yard field goal, 2:31 (IND 3–3)
- BAL – Vonta Leach 2-yard run, Justin Tucker XP good, 0:55 (BAL 3–10)
- IND – Adam Vinatieri 52-yard field goal, 0:03 (BAL 6–10)

Third quarter

- BAL – Dennis Pitta 20-yard pass from Joe Flacco, Justin Tucker XP good, 8:33 (BAL 6–17)
- IND – Adam Vinatieri 26-yard field goal, 0:44 (BAL 9–17)

Fourth quarter

- BAL – Anquan Boldin 18-yard pass from Joe Flacco, Justin Tucker XP good, 9:22 (BAL 9–24)

Top passers

- IND – Andrew Luck (28–54, 288 yards, INT)
- BAL – Joe Flacco (12–23, 282 yards, 2 TD)

Top rushers

- IND – Vick Ballard (22 rushes, 91 yards)
- BAL – Bernard Pierce (13 rushes, 103 yards)

Top receivers

- IND – Reggie Wayne (9 rec, 114 yards)
- BAL – Anquan Boldin (5 rec, 145 yards, TD)

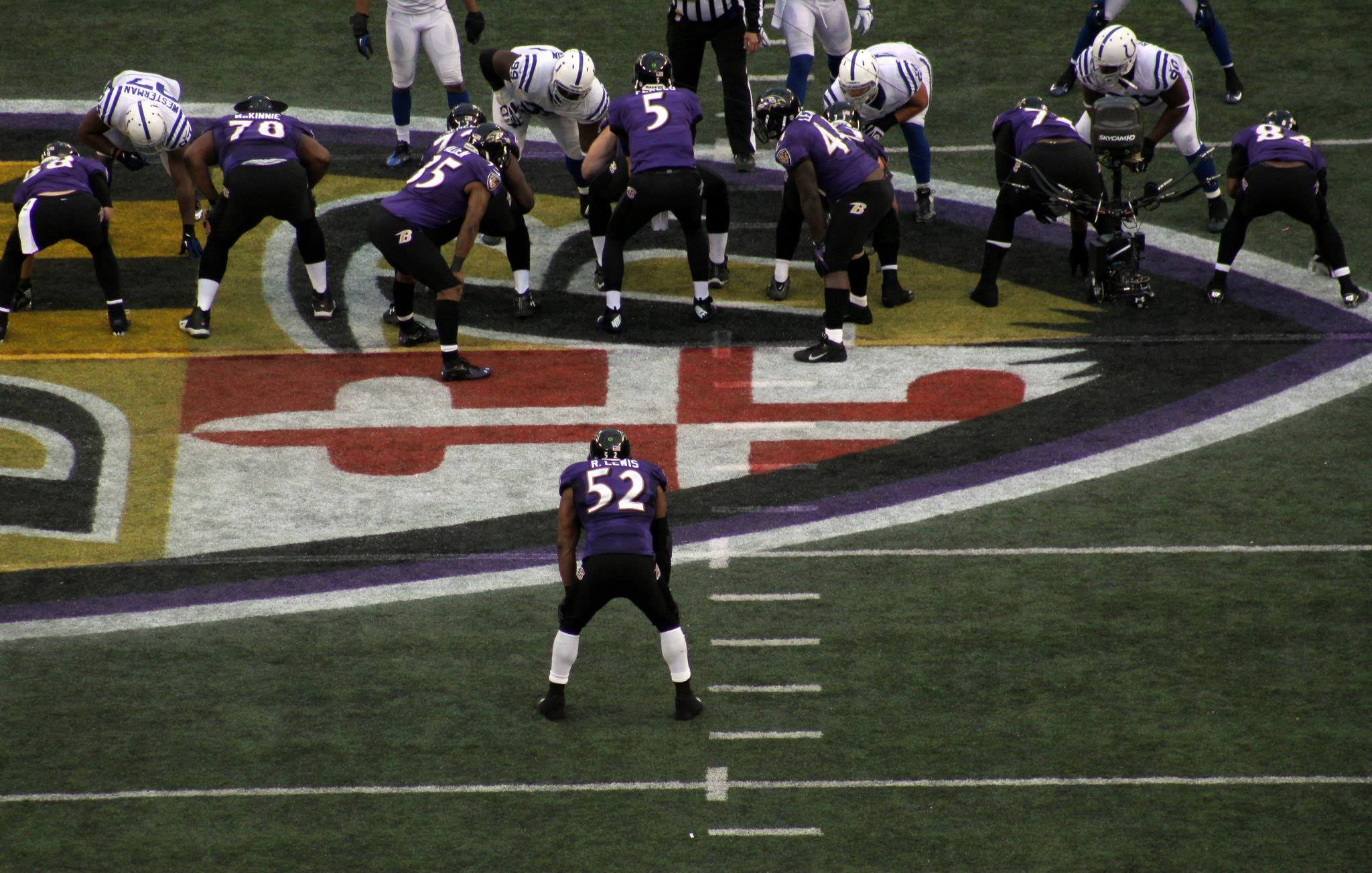
Ray Lewis lines up in the backfield for the final play of the Ravens' 24–9 victory over the Indianapolis Colts in the Wildcard Round of the 2012–2013 NFL Playoffs. This would be Lewis' final play in Baltimore.

By winning the AFC North title, the Ravens hosted the Colts – a team that once played in Baltimore until moving to Indianapolis in 1984 – in the wild-card round. This relocation remains a controversial issue. The Ravens had faced the Colts in the playoffs twice before, losing both times without scoring any touchdowns in divisional rounds: in 2006 and 2009.

The Ravens, with Ray Lewis playing in his final home game, limited the Colts to three field goals while Joe Flacco managed a pair of touchdown throws. Colts head coach Chuck Pagano was a part of the Ravens' coaching staff from 2008 to 2011, serving as defensive coordinator during the 2011 season. Ravens offensive coordinator Jim Caldwell was the head coach of the Colts from 2009 to 2011. Before the game, Colts offensive coordinator Bruce Arians was hospitalized with an illness.

The win also marked the first time in NFL history that a starting quarterback has won at least one playoff game in his first five seasons as Flacco's playoff record improved to 6–4 and the team's overall record improved to 11–6.

==== AFC Divisional Playoff Game: at #1 Denver Broncos ====
AFC Divisional Playoff Game: #4 Baltimore Ravens at #1 Denver Broncos – Game summary

Quarter	1	2	3	4	OT	2OT	Total
Ravens	14	7	7	7	0	3	38
Broncos	14	7	7	7	0	0	35

at Sports Authority Field at Mile High, Denver, Colorado

- Date: January 12, 2013
- Game time: 4:30 pm. EST/2:30 p.m. MST
- Game weather: 13 °F (−11 °C), partly cloudy
- Game attendance: 76,732
- Referee: Bill Vinovich
- TV announcers (CBS): Greg Gumbel, Dan Dierdorf and Solomon Wilcots

Game information

First quarter

- DEN – Trindon Holliday 90-yard punt return, Matt Prater XP good, 12:32 (DEN 0–7)
- BAL – Torrey Smith 59-yard pass from Joe Flacco, Justin Tucker XP good, 10:39 (BAL 7–7)
- BAL – Corey Graham 39-yard interception return, Justin Tucker XP good, 9:58 (BAL 14–7)
- DEN – Brandon Stokley 15-yard pass from Peyton Manning, Matt Prater XP good, 4:09 (DEN 14–14)

Second quarter

- DEN – Knowshon Moreno 14-yard pass from Peyton Manning, Matt Prater XP good, 7:32 (DEN 14–21)
- BAL – Torrey Smith 32-yard pass from Joe Flacco, Justin Tucker XP good, 0:43 (BAL 21–21)

Third quarter

- DEN – Trindon Holliday 104-yard kickoff return, Matt Prater XP good, 15:00 (DEN 21–28)
- BAL – Ray Rice 1-yard run, Justin Tucker XP good, 0:23 (BAL 28–28)

Fourth quarter

- DEN – Demaryius Thomas 17-yard pass from Peyton Manning, Matt Prater XP good, 7:18 (DEN 28–35)
- BAL – Jacoby Jones 70-yard pass from Joe Flacco, Justin Tucker XP good, 0:41 (BAL 35–35)

Overtime

- No scoring plays.

Second overtime

- BAL – Justin Tucker 47-yard field goal, 13:24 (BAL 38–35)

Top passers

- BAL – Joe Flacco (18–34, 331 yards, 3 TD)
- DEN – Peyton Manning (28–43, 290 yards, 3 TD, 2 INT)

Top rushers

- BAL – Ray Rice (30 rushes, 131 yards, TD)
- DEN – Ronnie Hillman (22 rushes, 83 yards)

Top receivers

- BAL – Torrey Smith (3 rec, 98 yards, 2 TD)
- DEN – Eric Decker (6 rec, 84 yards)

The Ravens faced the Denver Broncos for the second time in the playoffs, having defeated them 21–3 in the 2000 Wild Card playoffs, and also faced Peyton Manning for the third time in a playoff run.

The Broncos clawed to a 35–28 lead but had to punt back to the Ravens in the final two minutes. In the signature play of the game—a deep touchdown strike by Joe Flacco to Jacoby Jones which has come to be known as the Mile High Miracle—the Ravens tied the game after facing a 3rd-and-3, and with only :41 seconds left in the 4th quarter. After Baltimore tied the game, Manning and the Broncos took a controversial kneel down with 30-seconds left on the clock and two timeouts to take it to overtime. Later in the first overtime Manning was intercepted at his own 45-yard line, setting up the winning Ravens field goal in the opening minute of the second overtime. By improving to 1–2 against Manning in the playoffs, this was the Ravens' first victory against him since the 2001 season when he was with Indianapolis, along with their first-ever road victory against him. Synonymous with the biggest play of the game, this game goes down in Ravens lore as the Mile High Miracle. The victory improved their overall season record to 12–6.

==== AFC Championship: at #2 New England Patriots ====
AFC Championship: #4 Baltimore Ravens at #2 New England Patriots – Game summary

Quarter	1	2	3	4	Total
Ravens	0	7	7	14	28
Patriots	3	10	0	0	13

at Gillette Stadium, Foxborough, Massachusetts

- Date: January 20, 2013
- Game time: 6:30 pm. EST
- Game weather: 41 °F (5 °C), clear and windy
- Game attendance: 68,756
- Referee: Bill Leavy
- TV announcers (CBS): Jim Nantz, Phil Simms and Steve Tasker

Game information

First quarter

- NE – Stephen Gostkowski 31-yard field goal, 6:25 (NE 0–3)

Second quarter

- BAL – Ray Rice 2-yard run, Justin Tucker XP good, 9:33 (BAL 7–3)
- NE – Wes Welker 1-yard pass from Tom Brady, Stephen Gostkowski XP good, 4:22 (NE 7–10)
- NE – Stephen Gostkowski 25-yard field goal, 0:04 (NE 7–13)

Third quarter

- BAL – Dennis Pitta 5-yard pass from Joe Flacco, Justin Tucker XP good, 6:14 (BAL 14–13)

Fourth quarter

- BAL – Anquan Boldin 3-yard pass from Joe Flacco, Justin Tucker XP good, 15:00 (BAL 21–13)
- BAL – Anquan Boldin 11-yard pass from Joe Flacco, Justin Tucker XP good, 11:19 (BAL 28–13)

Top passers

- BAL – Joe Flacco (21–36, 240 yards, 3 TD)
- NE – Tom Brady (29–54, 320 yards, TD, 2 INT)

Top rushers

- BAL – Bernard Pierce (9 rushes, 52 yards)
- NE – Stevan Ridley (18 rushes, 70 yards)

Top receivers

- BAL – Torrey Smith (4 rec, 69 yards)
- NE – Wes Welker (8 rec, 117 yards, TD)

The Ravens found themselves playing against the Patriots in the AFC Championship game for the second year in a row after losing to them in heartbreaking fashion by a score of 23–20 in the 2011 AFC Championship game.

With the comeback win after trailing in the first-half, the Ravens not only improved their overall record to 13–6, but also advanced to the Super Bowl for the first time in twelve years.

The Ravens were the last team to defeat the Patriots at Foxborough in the playoffs until the Tennessee Titans pulled off the feat 7 years later in the 2019 AFC Wild Card game, which would ultimately be the final game Tom Brady played for the Patriots.

==== Super Bowl XLVII: vs. San Francisco 49ers ====
Super Bowl XLVII: Baltimore Ravens at San Francisco 49ers – Game summary

Quarter	1	2	3	4	Total
Ravens	7	14	7	6	34
49ers	3	3	17	8	31

at Mercedes-Benz Superdome, New Orleans, Louisiana

- Date: February 3, 2013
- Game time: 6:30 pm. EST/5:30 p.m. CST
- Game weather: Played indoors (dome stadium)
- Referee: Jerome Boger
- TV announcers (CBS): Jim Nantz, Phil Simms, Stave Tasker, and Solomon Wilcots

Game information

First quarter

- BAL – Anquan Boldin 13-yard pass from Joe Flacco, Justin Tucker XP good, 10:42 (BAL 7–0)
- SF – David Akers 36-yard field goal, 4:03 (BAL 7–3)

Second quarter

- BAL – Dennis Pitta 1-yard pass from Joe Flacco, Justin Tucker XP good, 7:15 (BAL 14–3)
- BAL – Jacoby Jones 56-yard pass from Joe Flacco, Justin Tucker XP good, 1:58 (BAL 21–3)
- SF – David Akers 27-yard field goal, 0:03 (BAL 21–6)

Third quarter

- BAL – Jacoby Jones 108-yard kickoff return, Justin Tucker XP good, 15:00 (BAL 28–6)
- SF – Michael Crabtree 31-yard pass from Colin Kaepernick, David Akers XP good, 7:28 (BAL 28–13)
- SF – Frank Gore 6-yard run, David Akers XP good, 5:05 (BAL 28–20)
- SF – David Akers 34-yard field goal, 3:14 (BAL 28–23)

Fourth quarter

- BAL – Justin Tucker 19-yard field goal, 12:57 (BAL 31–23)
- SF – Colin Kaepernick 15-yard run, two-point conversion attempt failed, 10:04 (BAL 31–29)
- BAL – Justin Tucker 38-yard field goal, 4:23 (BAL 34–29)
- SF – Sam Koch ran out of bounds in end zone for a safety, 0:12 (BAL 34–31)

Top passers

- BAL – Joe Flacco (22–33, 287 yards, 3 TD)
- SF – Colin Kaepernick (16–28, 302 yards, TD, INT)

Top rushers

- BAL – Ray Rice (20 rushes, 59 yards)
- SF – Frank Gore (19 rushes, 110 yards, TD)

Top receivers

- BAL – Anquan Boldin (6 rec, 104 yards, TD)
- SF – Michael Crabtree (5 rec, 109 yards, TD)

The Ravens advanced to their second Super Bowl in franchise history, facing the San Francisco 49ers. This would be the first time two brothers were head coaches of opposing teams in the Super Bowl with the 49ers being led by Jim Harbaugh, John Harbaugh's younger brother. The Ravens were designated the visiting team. After leading the entire game, the Ravens held on at the end, stopping the 49ers on four plays inside their own 10-yard line, then taking an intentional safety with four seconds remaining to milk the clock. During the 3rd quarter of the game, half of the power went out in the Superdome, leading to over a 30-minute delay in the game. They finished the season with an overall record of 14–6 with their 4–0 playoff run and improved to 2–0 in Super Bowl appearances, handing the 49ers their first Super Bowl loss as a franchise. The Ravens' win also marked the third-straight season in which a team seeded third or lower in its conference would defeat a top-seeded team from the other conference in a Super Bowl. With this win, the Ravens won their second Super Bowl, becoming the only team to win multiple Super Bowls without a loss, until the Tampa Bay Buccaneers won Super Bowl LV.

Team owner Steve Bisciotti stated during a press conference that the Ravens Super Bowl ring for the 2012 season was going to be white gold instead of yellow gold, at the request of players and coaches. While offensive coordinator Cam Cameron was fired after a week 14 loss to the Washington Redskins, head coach John Harbaugh stated that Cameron deserved and received a Super Bowl ring. As of 2024 this is the most recent Super Bowl the Ravens had appeared in and won.

== Statistics ==
=== Team leaders ===
Statistic	Player(s)	Value
Passing yards	Joe Flacco	3,817
Passing touchdowns	Joe Flacco	22
Rushing yards	Ray Rice	1,143
Rushing touchdowns	Ray Rice	9
Receiving yards	Anquan Boldin	921
Receiving touchdowns	Torrey Smith	8
Points	Justin Tucker	132
Kickoff return yards	Jacoby Jones	1,167
Punt return yards	Jacoby Jones	341
Tackles	Bernard Pollard	98
Sacks	Paul Kruger	9.0
Interceptions	Cary Williams/Ed Reed	4

stats values are correct through the end of the regular season. '

=== League rankings ===
- Total offense (YPG): 343.2 (19th)
- Passing (YPG): 241 (15th)
- Rushing (YPG): 102.4 (23rd)
- Total defense (YPG): 372.3 (25th)
- Passing (YPG): 247 (23rd)
- Rushing (YPG): 125.8 (23rd)

Stats correct through week 13.

== Standings ==
=== Division ===
AFC North
	W	L	T	PCT	DIV	CONF	PF	PA	STK
^{(4)} Baltimore Ravens	10	6	0	.625	4–2	8–4	398	344	L1
^{(6)} Cincinnati Bengals	10	6	0	.625	3–3	7–5	391	320	W3
Pittsburgh Steelers	8	8	0	.500	3–3	5–7	336	314	W1
Cleveland Browns	5	11	0	.313	2–4	5–7	302	368	L3

=== Conference ===
AFC
#	Team	Division	W	L	T	PCT	DIV	CONF	SOS	SOV	STK
Division winners
1	Denver Broncos	West	13	3	0	.813	6–0	10–2	.457	.385	W11
2 (Note: New England clinched the AFC's No. 2 seed over Houston based on a head-to-head victory.)	New England Patriots	East	12	4	0	.750	6–0	11–1	.496	.466	W2
3	Houston Texans	South	12	4	0	.750	5–1	10–2	.496	.432	L2
4 (Note: Baltimore clinched the AFC North title over Cincinnati based on a better divisional record (4–2 to 3–3).)	Baltimore Ravens	North	10	6	0	.625	4–2	8–4	.496	.438	L1
Wild cards
5	Indianapolis Colts	South	11	5	0	.688	4–2	8–4	.441	.403	W2
6	Cincinnati Bengals	North	10	6	0	.625	3–3	7–5	.438	.381	W3
Did not qualify for the postseason
7	Pittsburgh Steelers	North	8	8	0	.500	3–3	5–7	.465	.438	W1
8 (Note: San Diego finished with a better conference record than Miami (7–5 to 5–7).)	San Diego Chargers	West	7	9	0	.438	4–2	7–5	.457	.286	W2
9	Miami Dolphins	East	7	9	0	.438	2–4	5–7	.500	.415	L1
10 (Note: Tennessee finished ahead of New York Jets based on head-to-head victory.)	Tennessee Titans	South	6	10	0	.375	1–5	5–7	.512	.344	W1
11 (Note: New York Jets finished ahead of Buffalo in the AFC East based on record versus common opponents (5–7 to 3–9).)	New York Jets	East	6	10	0	.375	2–4	4–8	.512	.401	L3
12	Buffalo Bills	East	6	10	0	.375	2–4	5–7	.480	.281	W1
13	Cleveland Browns	North	5	11	0	.313	2–4	5–7	.508	.388	L3
14	Oakland Raiders	West	4	12	0	.250	2–4	4–8	.469	.219	L2
15 (Note: Jacksonville finished with a better conference record than Kansas City (2–10 to 0–12).)	Jacksonville Jaguars	South	2	14	0	.125	2–4	2–10	.539	.531	L5
16	Kansas City Chiefs	West	2	14	0	.125	0–6	0–12	.516	.438	L4
Tiebreakers (Note: When breaking ties for three or more teams under the NFL's rules, they are first broken within divisions, then comparing only the highest ranked remaining team from each division.)
