= Timpanogos (disambiguation) =

The Timpanogos were a tribe of Native Americans populating central Utah in the 1800s.

Timpanogos may also refer to:

- Mount Timpanogos, a mountain in Utah in the United States
- Timpanogos Cave National Monument, a cave system near Mount Timpanogos.
- Timpanogos High School in Orem, Utah.
- Lake Timpanogos, original name for Utah Lake, and the mythical river once believed to flow from there to the Pacific Ocean.
