= David Reed (American football) =

American football player (born 1987)

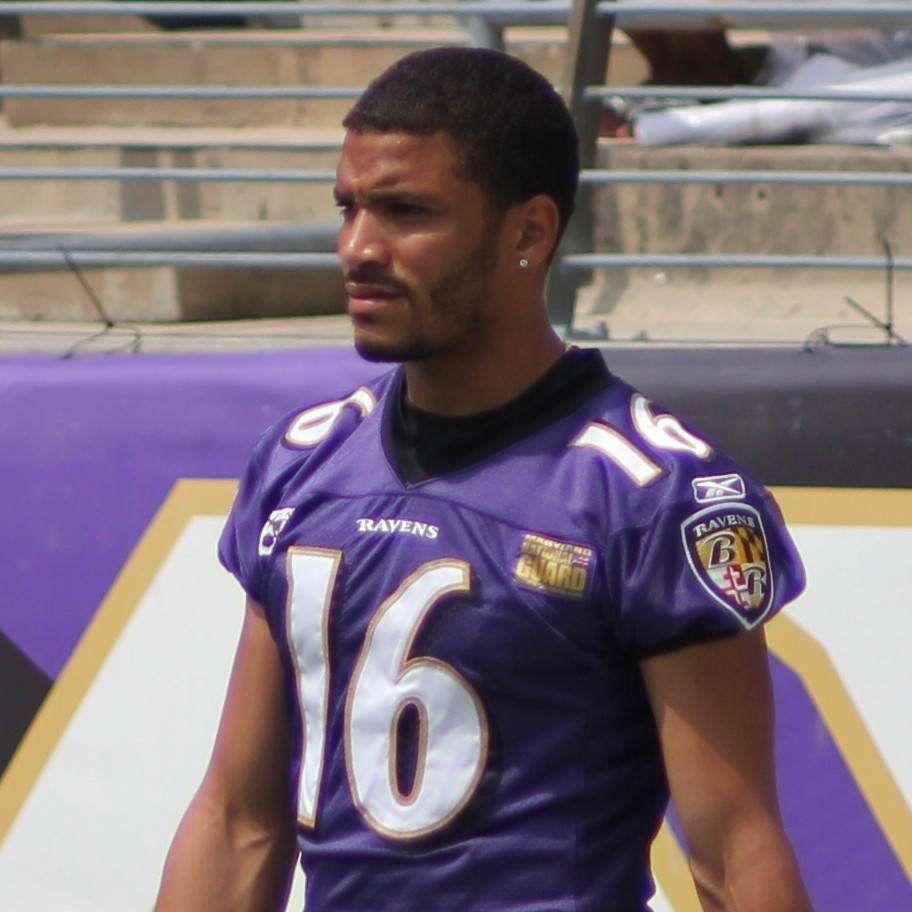
- Reed with the Baltimore Ravens in 2011

No. 16, 85
- Position: Wide receiver

Personal information
- Born: March 22, 1987 (age 39); Dubuque, Iowa, U.S.
- Listed height: 6 ft 0 in (1.83 m)
- Listed weight: 190 lb (86 kg)

Career information
- High school: New London (CT)
- College: Pasadena City College (2006-2007); Utah (2008-2009)
- NFL draft: 2010: 5th round, 156th overall pick

Career history
- Baltimore Ravens (2010−2012); Indianapolis Colts (2013); San Francisco 49ers (2014)*
- * Offseason or practice squad member only

Awards and highlights
- Super Bowl champion (XLVII); First-team All-MW (2009)

Career NFL statistics
- Receptions: 6
- Receiving yards: 68
- Return yards: 1,740
- Total touchdowns: 1
- Stats at Pro Football Reference

Brandon David Reed (born March 22, 1987) is an American former professional football player who was a wide receiver in the National Football League (NFL). He played college football for the Utah Utes and was selected by the Baltimore Ravens in the fifth round of the 2010 NFL draft. With the Ravens he won Super Bowl XLVII, and he also played a season with the Indianapolis Colts.

== Early life ==
A native of New Britain, Connecticut, David Reed attended St. Paul Catholic High School for his freshman year of high school where he lettered in football and basketball. Reed left St. Paul the following year to attend New Britain High School. Reed followed his head coach Jack Cochran to New London High School, where he was First-team All-Conference and All-State. He went on to attend Pasadena City College, where he averaged 166.1 yards per game receiving and broke every single-game and career reception record, while setting a national junior college reception record with 111 catches (1,661 yards, 13 TDs) in 10 games in 2007. He was named First-team All-Conference and First-team Junior College Gridwire All-American.

Regarded as a three-star prospect by Rivals.com, Reed was recruited by Utah, Iowa, and Kansas State.

== College career ==
In his first season at Utah, Reed earned All-MWC honorable mention as kick-returner. He played in all 13 games, on special teams and as wide receiver, recording 25 catches for 427 yards (17.1 yards per reception led Utah) and six touchdown catches (ranked second on the team). Reed helped the 2008 Utes to a 13–0 season and a 31–17 win over Alabama in the 2009 Sugar Bowl, in which he averaged 29.0 yards on two receptions, including a 28-yard touchdown grab that gave Utah a 28-17 lead.

As a senior, Reed set school records for both receptions (81) and receiving yards (1,188) in a season. He led the MWC and ranked 15th in the nation in receiving yards per game (91.4). He also led the MWC in receptions with 81 and was the only 1,000-yard receiver in the conference (1,188).

== Professional career ==
=== 2010 NFL draft ===
Pre-draft measurables
Height	Weight	Arm length	Hand span	40-yard dash	10-yard split	20-yard split	20-yard shuttle	Three-cone drill	Vertical jump	Broad jump	Bench press
6 ft 0 1/8 in (1.83 m)	191 lb (87 kg)	31 3/4 in (0.81 m)	9 3/8 in (0.24 m)	4.52 s	1.59 s	2.65 s	4.15 s	6.78 s	37 in (0.94 m)	9 ft 6 in (2.90 m)	15 reps
All values from NFL Combine/Pro Day

=== Baltimore Ravens ===
On December 13, 2010, against the Houston Texans, Reed scored his first, and only, NFL touchdown on a 103-yard kickoff return. The return set a new Ravens franchise record (eclipsing the old mark of 97 yards by Patrick Johnson) and his 233 kickoff return yards were also the second most in franchise history. For his efforts, Reed was named AFC Special Teams Player of the Week.

In 2011, Reed was suspended without pay for the September 11 season opener against the Pittsburgh Steelers and fined an additional game check for violating the NFL's substance-abuse policy. Reed's suspension stemmed from a 2010 incident in which police discovered marijuana at his residence.

In week 10 of the 2011 season, Reed fumbled two kickoff returns against the Seattle Seahawks one after running into his own teammate and the other after he lost his balance.

He caught five passes during a Week 17 loss to the Bengals in 2012, the Ravens championship season.

=== Indianapolis Colts ===
On August 21, 2013, the Ravens traded Reed to the Indianapolis Colts in exchange for running back Delone Carter. On November 10, Reed caught his first pass of the season on his first target; however, it was in a 38-8 loss to the St. Louis Rams on a pass from backup quarterback Matt Hasselbeck. On November 26, Reed was waived by the Colts.

=== San Francisco 49ers ===
Reed was signed to the San Francisco 49ers' roster on January 14, 2014. He was waived by the 49ers on August 25.

== Personal life ==
Reed is the older brother of retired tight end Jordan Reed, who was selected in the third round of 2013 NFL draft by the Washington Redskins.
