= Timpanogos High School =

Location
- 1450 N. 200 E. Orem, Utah 84057; 40°19′24″N 111°41′30″W

Information
- Type: Public
- Opened: 1996
- Principal: Theron Murphy
- Teaching staff: 60.82 (FTE)
- Grades: 10–12
- Enrollment: 1,455 (2023-2024)
- Average class size: 5A
- Student to teacher ratio: 23.92
- Colors: Navy blue, green, grey, and white
- Mascot: Timberwolf
- Website: Timpanogos High School

Timpanogos High School is a public high school in Orem, Utah, United States. It is part of the Alpine School District and opened to its first students in August 1996. of Utah County.

The school mascot is the Timberwolf and the official school colors are blue, green, grey, and white.

In 2010, Timpanogos High School began a radio station, at KTWF 88.9 FM, and continues to operate today.

== Administration ==
The Principal is Theron Murphy, and Assistant Principals are Kyle Robinson, Ryan Francom and Rod Campbell.

== Notable alumni ==
- Quinn Allman - guitarist
- Chelsie Hightower - dancer
- Jonathan Hoffman - animator for Pixar
- Allison Holker - dancer
- Paul Kruger - professional football player
- Bert McCracken - singer
- Matt Norman - professional basketball player

== See also ==
- List of high schools in Utah
