= Paul Kruger (American football) =

American football player (born 1986)

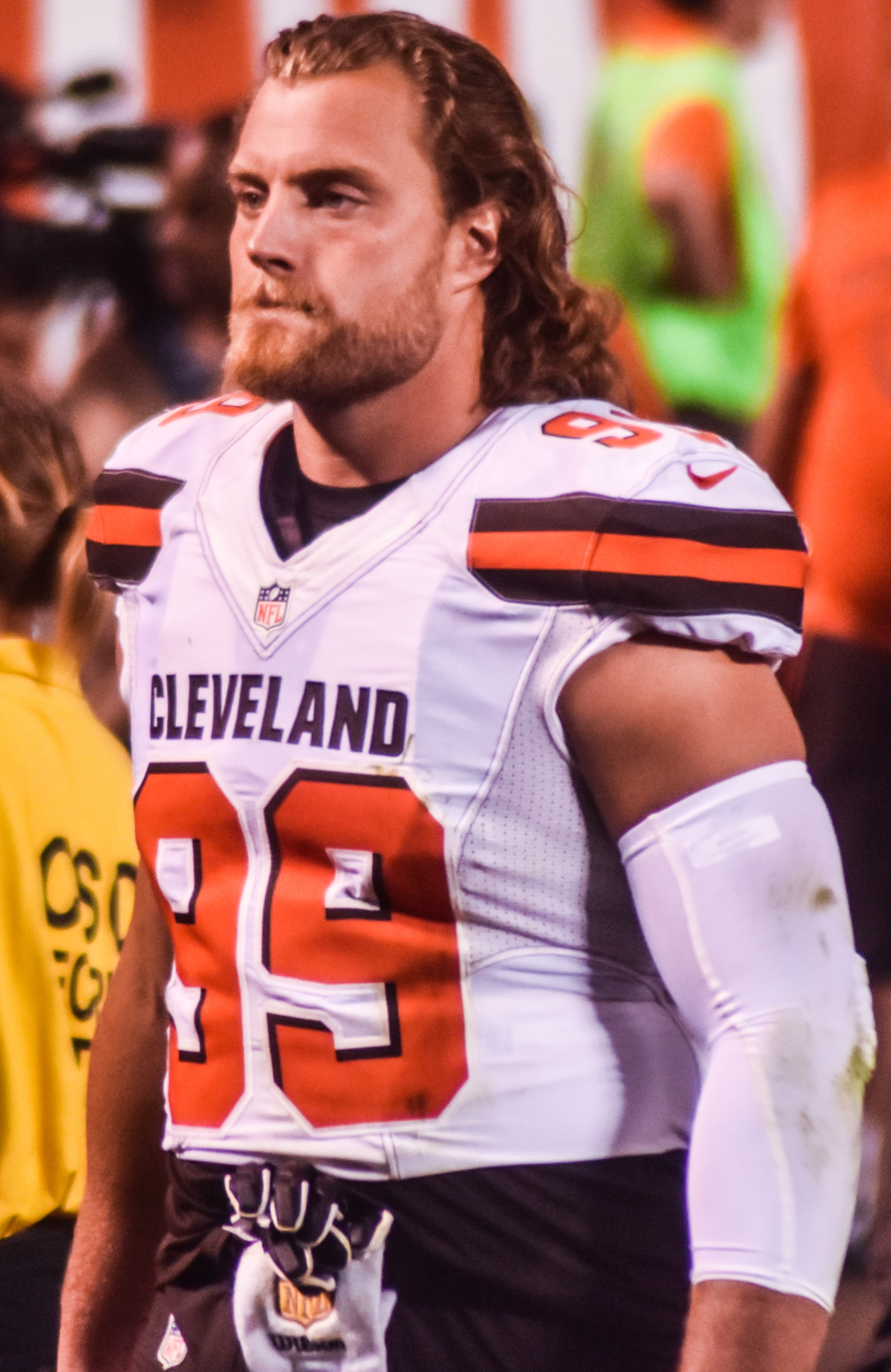
- Kruger with the Cleveland Browns in 2015

No. 99
- Position: Defensive end

Personal information
- Born: February 15, 1986 (age 40); Rexburg, Idaho, U.S.
- Listed height: 6 ft 4 in (1.93 m)
- Listed weight: 270 lb (122 kg)

Career information
- High school: Timpanogos (Orem, Utah)
- College: Utah (2004, 2007–2008)
- NFL draft: 2009: 2nd round, 57th overall pick

Career history
- Baltimore Ravens (2009–2012); Cleveland Browns (2013–2015); New Orleans Saints (2016)

Awards and highlights
- Super Bowl champion (XLVII); First-team All-MW (2008)

Career NFL statistics
- Total tackles: 221
- Sacks: 35
- Forced fumbles: 8
- Fumble recoveries: 6
- Interceptions: 2
- Stats at Pro Football Reference

Paul Christian Kruger Jr. (born February 15, 1986) is an American former professional football player who was a defensive end in the National Football League (NFL). He was selected by the Baltimore Ravens in the second round of the 2009 NFL draft. He played college football for the Utah Utes. He also played for the Cleveland Browns and New Orleans Saints.

== Early life ==
Kruger was an All-conference and preseason All-America quarterback as a senior in 2003 at Timpanogos High School in Orem, Utah. He was the team captain and lettered all four years. Kruger was ranked in the top 30 quarterbacks nationally by Student Sports.

From 2005 to 2007, he served a two-year mission for the LDS church in the Kansas City area (The Missouri Independence Mission).

== College career ==
Kruger signed with the University of Utah Utes as a quarterback in 2004. He redshirted his freshman year of 2004, after which he served a two-year mission in Kansas and Missouri for the Church of Jesus Christ of Latter-day Saints, returning to the football field in the fall of 2007.

In 2007, he was a Sporting News and Scout.com second-team Freshman All-American. He was also honorable mention All-Mountain West. Kruger played in all 13 games and started the last 11 at right end. His 63 tackles were the most among the league's freshman linemen and the second-best freshman total at any position and ranked fourth on the team. He also had 7.5 tackles for loss, three sacks, five pass breakups, three fumble recoveries, a forced fumble and an interception. Kruger helped lead a Utes’ defense that ranked 11th in the nation against the run (99.2 ypg) and 11th-overall in total defense (289.2 ypg).

Due to an off-field injury (see Personal section), he was held out of spring practices but returned to the field in the fall.

As a sophomore in 2008, he was a first-team All-Mountain West defensive lineman. Sports Illustrated and College Football News named him honorable mention All-American. He played and started in all 13 games at right end. He led Utah and ranked second in the conference in tackles for loss (16.5) and was third in the league in sacks (7.5). He had seven pass breakups, which ranked second on the team, as well as two forced fumbles. His 61 total tackles ranked fifth on the team. He had four sacks (all solo) against Utah State that tied the school record and was the best single-game total in the country. His five TFL in that same game was the second-best mark in school history. He intercepted a pass against BYU and returned it 30 yards.

Kruger decided to forgo his final two years of college eligibility to enter the 2009 NFL draft.

== Professional career ==
=== Pre-draft ===
Kruger was considered a top defensive end prospect for the 2009 NFL draft.

Pre-draft measurables
Height	Weight	40-yard dash	10-yard split	20-yard split	20-yard shuttle	Three-cone drill	Vertical jump	Broad jump	Bench press	Wonderlic
6 ft 4 1/4 in (1.94 m)	263 lb (119 kg)	4.79 s	1.58 s	2.78 s	4.47 s	7.52 s	32 1/2 in (0.83 m)	9 ft 1 in (2.77 m)	24 reps	25
All values from NFL Combine, except dash, broad jump, which are from University of Utah Pro Day

=== Baltimore Ravens ===
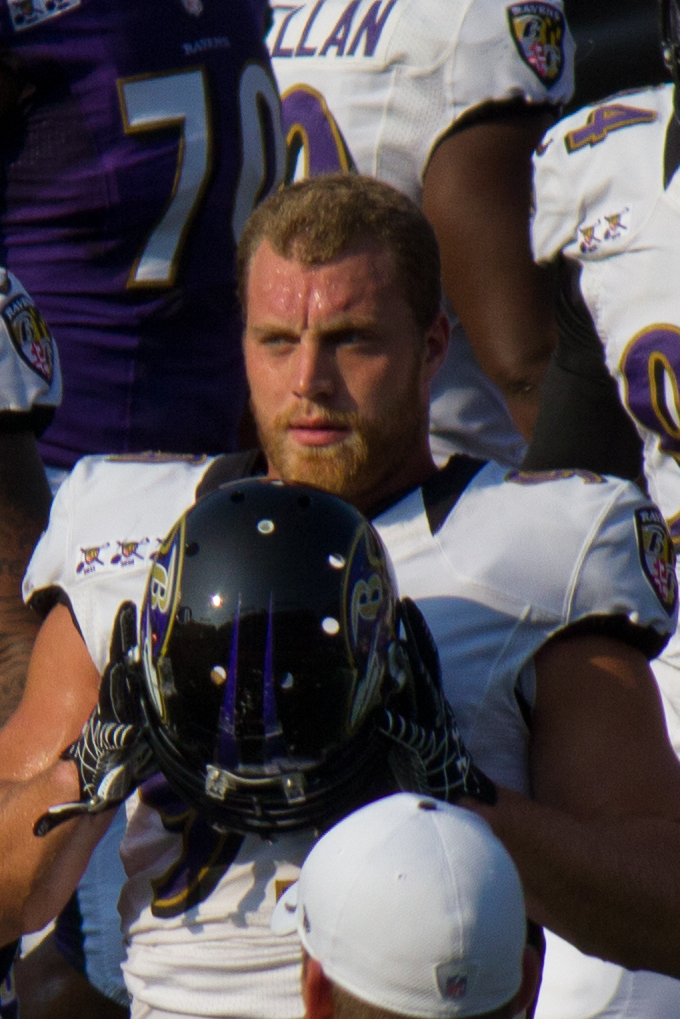
Kruger at Ravens M&T Bank Stadium practice in August 2012.

On April 25, 2009, Kruger was selected in the second round (57th overall pick) of the 2009 NFL draft by the Baltimore Ravens.

On November 29, 2009, in a game against the Pittsburgh Steelers, Kruger intercepted a Dennis Dixon pass in overtime and returned it 22 yards to set the Ravens up for a game-winning 29-yard field goal by kicker Billy Cundiff.

During the 2010 offseason Kruger was looking to bulk up in order to make the move from linebacker to defensive end in Baltimore's 3–4 defense mostly because of the lack of playing time he saw at OLB.

2010 was a frustrating year for Kruger playing in a new position as a 3–4 DE, he only recorded one tackle, and one sack in very limited playing time, playing in just 11 games and no starts. He deflected two passes.

After a 2010 season in which he struggled to get playing time at defensive end, he was moved back to outside linebacker in the Ravens hybrid 3–4 defensive scheme in 2011. He saw much more action in 2011 playing as a situational pass rusher, coming in and replacing Ravens veteran linebacker Jarret Johnson for 3rd down passing situations. He managed to rack up 5.5 regular season sacks in his new role, along with 15 tackles. In addition to this, he also recorded a sack against New England Patriots quarterback Tom Brady in the AFC championship game. The Ravens would go on to lose this game 23–20.

During the 2012 season, Kruger would become a significant part of the Ravens defense. In Week 10, against the Oakland Raiders, Kruger deflected a pass and picked an interception in a 55–20 win. During Week 16 against the New York Giants, he sacked quarterback Eli Manning in a 33–14 victory. During the Wild Card Round in the 2012 playoffs, he forced Indianapolis Colts quarterback Andrew Luck to fumble. The Ravens would win 24–9. In the Divisional Round against the Denver Broncos, he recovered a strip sack fumble by Terrell Suggs on quarterback Peyton Manning in which the Ravens would go on to win 38–35 in double overtime. In Super Bowl XLVII, he had two sacks on critical junctures of the game, forcing the 49ers to kick field goals. The Ravens went on to win this game 34–31, giving Kruger his first Super Bowl victory.

=== Cleveland Browns ===
Kruger signed with the Cleveland Browns to a five-year $40M contract on March 12, 2013. He was one of the starting outside linebackers on opening day and has started all 16 games in 2013 for the team, providing a much needed pass rush from the Browns team of the previous year with 4.5 recorded sacks. He finished the 2013 season with 47 total tackles and 4.5 sacks.

Kruger had his best career season in 2014 recording 11 sacks, 36 solo tackles and 17 assists. He had 4 forced fumbles with one fumble recovery and played in all 16 games, starting 15 of them.

In 2015, Kruger recorded 2.5 sacks, 16 solo tackles, and 11 assists in 16 games and 15 starts.

Kruger was released by the Browns on August 29, 2016, during the final week of the preseason.

=== New Orleans Saints ===
On August 31, 2016, Kruger was signed by the New Orleans Saints.

== Career statistics ==
=== NFL ===
==== Regular season ====
Year	Team	Games		Tackles						Interceptions				Fumbles		
Year	Team	GP	GS	Cmb	Solo	Ast	Sck	Sfty	TFL	Int	Yds	Lng	PD	FF	FR	Yds
2009	BAL	9	1	11	4	7	0.0	0	0	1	26	26	3	0	0	0
2010	BAL	11	0	1	1	0	1.0	0	1	0	0	0	2	0	0	0
2011	BAL	16	0	15	12	3	5.5	0	5	0	0	0	2	0	2	0
2012	BAL	15	6	42	30	12	9.0	0	11	1	0	0	6	1	1	9
2013	CLE	16	16	47	26	21	4.5	0	5	0	0	0	5	2	0	0
2014	CLE	16	15	53	36	17	11.0	0	13	0	0	0	4	4	1	0
2015	CLE	16	15	27	16	11	2.5	0	5	0	0	0	0	0	0	0
2016	NO	15	13	25	20	5	1.5	1	6	0	0	0	1	1	2	0
Career		114	66	221	145	76	35.0	1	46	2	26	26	23	8	6	9

==== Postseason ====
Year	Team	Games		Tackles						Interceptions				Fumbles		
Year	Team	GP	GS	Cmb	Solo	Ast	Sck	Sfty	TFL	Int	Yds	Lng	PD	FF	FR	Yds
2010	BAL	2	0	1	0	1	0.5	0	0	0	0	0	0	0	0	0
2011	BAL	2	0	3	2	1	1.0	0	1	0	0	0	0	0	0	0
2012	BAL	4	2	14	9	5	4.5	0	3	0	0	0	1	1	1	0
Career		8	2	18	11	7	6.0	0	4	0	0	0	1	1	1	0

=== College ===
Year	Team	GP	GS	UA	AT	TT	T/L	Sacks	FF	FR	PD	INT
2007	Utah	13	11	24	39	63	7.5	3	1	3	5	1
2008	Utah	13	13	30	31	61	16.5	7.5	2	0	7	1
Totals		26	24	55	69	124	24	10.5	3	3	12	2

== Personal life ==
Kruger married Cleveland native Jacqueline Hoyle on July 18, 2015. Together they have four children.

Kruger went through two serious childhood accidents. He lost a kidney and his spleen and almost died in his uncle's jeep accident at age 13. In college at Salt Lake City, Utah (January 29, 2008), a street stabbing left him with a collapsed lung and a 6.5-inch scar on his chest. A screwdriver was driven through the back of a Ute teammate and brass knuckles were used to break the nose and shatter the cheekbone of his younger brother. The fight left Kruger with "life-threatening injuries" that required nearly 50 staples to close the incisions made during a four-hour surgery.
