= Derrick Shelby =

American football player (born 1989)

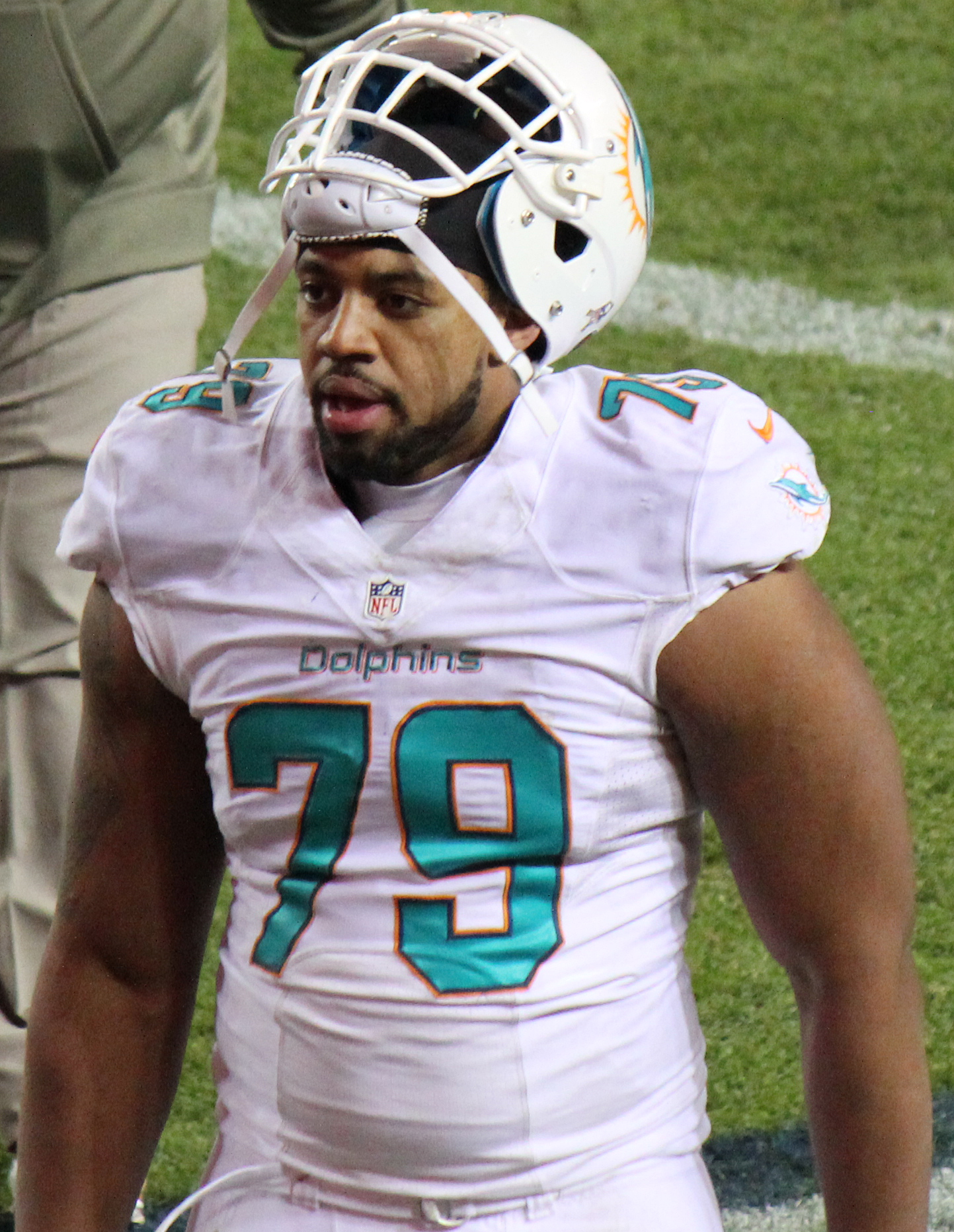
- Shelby with the Miami Dolphins in 2014

No. 79, 90
- Position: Defensive end

Personal information
- Born: March 4, 1989 (age 37); Houston, Texas, U.S.
- Listed height: 6 ft 2 in (1.88 m)
- Listed weight: 280 lb (127 kg)

Career information
- High school: Hightower (Missouri City, Texas)
- College: Utah
- NFL draft: 2012: undrafted

Career history
- Miami Dolphins (2012–2015); Atlanta Falcons (2016–2018)

Awards and highlights
- First-team All-Pac-12 (2011)

Career NFL statistics
- Total tackles: 153
- Sacks: 10.0
- Forced fumbles: 4
- Fumble recoveries: 1
- Interceptions: 2
- Defensive touchdowns: 1
- Stats at Pro Football Reference

Derrick Shelby (born March 4, 1989) is an American former professional football player who was a defensive end in the National Football League (NFL). He was signed by the Miami Dolphins after going undrafted in 2012. He played college football for the Utah Utes.

== College career ==
At the University of Utah, Shelby appeared in 47 games in his four-year career for the Utes and finished with 169 tackles. After his senior year, he was awarded 1st Team All-Pac-12.

== Professional career ==
=== Miami Dolphins ===
Shelby was signed by the Miami Dolphins on April 29, 2012, after going undrafted in the 2012 NFL draft. He played all sixteen games in his rookie season, recording eight tackles.

On September 8, 2013, Shelby recorded his first-career sack, which included a forced fumble against the Cleveland Browns. The next week on September 15, he would strip-sack Andrew Luck for his second sack and forced fumble on the season. On September 30, 2013, he made his first-career start in his second season against the New Orleans Saints. Shelby finished his second NFL season with a season-high 34 tackles, two forced fumbles and 2.5 sacks.

On September 28, 2014, Shelby recorded a career-high two sacks against the Oakland Raiders. On October 6, the Dolphins suspended Shelby indefinitely for poor conduct. He was reinstated on October 13. On October 19, he recorded his third sack of the season against the Chicago Bears. On December 21, Shelby recorded his first-career interception against the Minnesota Vikings, becoming the first Dolphins defensive lineman to intercept a pass since Randy Starks in 2012. He completed his third season with 26 tackles, a season-high three sacks, and his first interception.

On November 15, 2015, Shelby strip-sacked Sam Bradford in a 20-19 win against the Philadelphia Eagles, his third career strip-sack and first sack of the season. The next week on November 22, he recorded his second sack against the Dallas Cowboys. On December 6, Shelby picked off Baltimore Ravens' Matt Schaub and ran 22 yards for his first-career touchdown, becoming the first Dolphins defensive lineman to record an interception for a touchdown since Phillip Merling in 2008. On January 3, 2016, he dropped New England Patriots' Tom Brady for his third sack of the season. He ended his final season on the Dolphins with season-highs in tackles (37), sacks (3.5), as well as an interception, two forced fumbles, and a touchdown.

=== Atlanta Falcons ===
On March 9, 2016, Shelby signed a four-year, $21 million contract with the Atlanta Falcons. On October 18, 2016, he was placed on injured reserve with an Achilles injury. In the 2016 season, the Falcons would reach Super Bowl LI. However, Shelby could not participate due to his injury. Against the New England Patriots, the Falcons would fall in a 34–28 overtime defeat.

On October 1, 2017, Shelby knocked down Tyrod Taylor, receiving his first sack as a Falcon in a 17-23 loss to the Buffalo Bills. In his second season with the Falcons, he had 14 starts in 16 games, recording 30 tackles and a sack.

On March 2, 2018, Shelby was released by the Falcons. He was re-signed by the Falcons on March 22, 2018. He was placed on injured reserve on November 28, 2018, with a groin injury.

== NFL statistics ==
Season		Games		Tackles				Interceptions				Fumbles	
Year	Team	GP	GS	Comb	Total	Ast	Sacks	Int	Yds	TD	PD	FF	FR
2012	MIA	16	0	8	7	1	0.0	0	0	0	0	0	0
2013	MIA	16	1	34	23	11	2.5	0	0	0	0	2	0
2014	MIA	15	0	26	21	5	3.0	1	2	0	1	0	1
2015	MIA	16	9	37	25	12	3.5	1	22	1	4	2	0
2016	ATL	6	4	8	6	2	0.0	0	0	0	1	0	0
2017	ATL	16	14	30	16	14	1.0	0	0	0	0	0	0
2018	ATL	7	3	10	8	2	0.0	0	0	0	0	0	0
Career		92	31	153	106	47	10.0	2	24	1	6	4	1
