= Utah Utes football statistical leaders =

The Utah Utes football statistical leaders are individual statistical leaders of the Utah Utes football program in various categories, including passing, rushing, receiving, total offense, defensive stats, and kicking. Within those areas, the lists identify single-game, single-season, and career leaders. The Utes represent the University of Utah in the NCAA Division I FBS Big 12 Conference.

Although Utah began competing in intercollegiate football in 1892, the school's official record book does not generally have entries from before the 1960s, as records from before this period are often incomplete and inconsistent.

These lists are dominated by more recent players for several reasons:

- Since the 1960s, seasons have increased from 10 games to 11 and then 12 games in length.
- The NCAA didn't allow freshmen to play varsity football until 1972 (with the exception of the World War II years), allowing players to have four-year careers.
- Bowl games only began counting toward single-season and career statistics in 2002. The Utes have played in 15 bowl games since then, giving many recent players an extra game to accumulate statistics.
- Utah's former home of the Pac-12 Conference held a championship game during the Utes' entire tenure in that conference from 2011 to 2023. Utah played in the championship game four times (2018, 2019, 2021, 2022), giving players in those seasons yet another game to accumulate statistics. With the Big 12 also holding its own championship game, Utah will have the opportunity for another game should it qualify for the championship game in a given season.
- From 2018 through 2025, players were allowed to participate in as many as four games in a redshirt season; previously, playing in even one game "burned" the redshirt. In 2024 and 2025, postseason games did not count against the four-game limit. These changes to redshirt rules gave players during this period several extra games to accumulate statistics.
- A more recent change likely to significantly affect future career leaderboards was introduced in 2026 with full implementation starting with the 2027 freshman class. Going forward, redshirting will be prohibited, but players will have five years of full athletic eligibility, provided that they are no older than 19 when they first enroll in a postsecondary institution—with a caveat relevant to Utah. This rule change specifically maintained the NCAA's longstanding practice of not counting time spent on religious missions against athletic eligibility. With most male LDS Church members, including some future Utah players, going on missions immediately after high school graduation, their eligibility clock will not start until after they complete their two-year mission term. Players who had remaining eligibility under previous rules at the end of the 2025 season will benefit from the new rule.
- Due to COVID-19 issues, the NCAA ruled that the 2020 season would not count against any football player's athletic eligibility, giving all who played in that season the opportunity for five years of eligibility instead of the normal four.

These lists are updated through Week 12 of the 2026 season. Active players are listed in bold.

== Passing ==
=== Passing yards ===
Career
Rk	Player	Yards	Years
1	Scott Mitchell	8,981	1987 1988 1989
2	Brian Johnson	7,853	2004 2005 2007 2008
3	Mike McCoy	7,404	1992 1993 1994
4	Travis Wilson	7,403	2012 2013 2014 2015
5	Tyler Huntley	7,351	2016 2017 2018 2019
6	Cameron Rising	6,127	2020 2021 2022 2024
7	Larry Egger	5,749	1985 1986
8	Alex Smith	5,203	2002 2003 2004
9	Mike Fouts	5,107	1995 1996
10	**Devon Dampier**	5,025	2025 2026

Single season
Rk	Player	Yards	Year
1	Scott Mitchell	4,322	1988
2	Mike McCoy	3,860	1993
3	Scott Mitchell	3,211	1989
4	Tyler Huntley	3,092	2019
5	Mike McCoy	3,035	1994
6	Cameron Rising	3,034	2022
7	Larry Egger	2,988	1985
8	Brian Johnson	2,972	2008
9	Alex Smith	2,952	2004
10	Brian Johnson	2,892	2005

Single game
Rk	Player	Yards	Year	Opponent
1	Scott Mitchell	620	1988	Air Force
2	Scott Mitchell	511	1988	Idaho State
3	Larry Egger	492	1986	UTEP
4	Larry Egger	476	1986	Air Force
5	Mike Fouts	476	1996	Kansas
6	Mike McCoy	459	1993	Air Force
7	Scott Mitchell	453	1988	UTEP
8	Mike McCoy	447	1993	Hawaii
9	Brett Elliott	440	2002	New Mexico
10	Mike McCoy	434	1993	BYU

=== Passing touchdowns ===
Career
Rk	Player	TDs	Years
1	Scott Mitchell	69	1987 1988 1989
2	Brian Johnson	57	2004 2005 2007 2008
3	Travis Wilson	54	2012 2013 2014 2015
4	Cameron Rising	53	2020 2021 2022 2024
5	Mike McCoy	49	1992 1993 1994
6	**Devon Dampier**	48	2025 2026
7	Alex Smith	47	2002 2003 2004
8	Tyler Huntley	46	2016 2017 2018 2019
9	Don Van Galder	39	1971 1972 1973
	Larry Egger	39	1985 1986
	Mike Fouts	39	1995 1996

Single season
Rk	Player	TDs	Year
1	Alex Smith	32	2004
2	Scott Mitchell	31	1989
3	Scott Mitchell	29	1988
4	Mike McCoy	28	1994
5	Brian Johnson	27	2008
6	Cameron Rising	26	2022
7	Devon Dampier	24	2025
	**Devon Dampier**	24	2026
9	Brett Ratliff	23	2006
10	Larry Egger	21	1986
	Mike McCoy	21	1993
	Mike Fouts	21	1996

Single game
Rk	Player	TDs	Year	Opponent
1	Ricky Hardin	6	1980	New Mexico
	Scott Mitchell	6	1989	UTEP
3	Larry Egger	5	1986	UTEP
	Scott Mitchell	5	1988	Air Force
	Scott Mitchell	5	1989	Utah State
	Mike McCoy	5	1994	Wyoming
	Alex Smith	5	2004	San Diego State
	Brian Johnson	5	2008	San Diego State
	Travis Wilson	5	2014	Fresno State
	Cameron Rising	5	2024	Southern Utah

== Rushing ==
=== Rushing yards ===
Career
Rk	Player	Yards	Years
1	Zack Moss	4,067	2016 2017 2018 2019
2	Eddie Johnson	3,219	1984 1985 1986 1987 1988
3	Tony Lindsay	2,995	1977 1978 1979 1980
4	Devontae Booker	2,773	2014 2015
5	Chris Fuamatu-Ma'afala	2,630	1995 1996 1997
6	Del Rodgers	2,616	1978 1979 1980 1981
7	Juan Johnson	2,601	1994 1995 1996 1997
8	John White	2,560	2011 2012
9	Micah Bernard	2,217	2019 2020 2021 2022 2023 2024
10	Eddie Lewis	2,179	1982 1983 1984 1985

Single season
Rk	Player	Yards	Year
1	John White	1,519	2011
2	Devontae Booker	1,512	2014
3	Carl Monroe	1,507	1982
4	Zack Moss	1,416	2019
5	Joe Williams	1,407	2016
6	Dameon Hunter	1,396	2001
7	Devontae Booker	1,261	2015
8	Darrell Mack	1,204	2007
9	Zack Moss	1,173	2017
	Mike Anderson	1,173	1998

Single game
Rk	Player	Yards	Year	Opponent
1	Joe Williams	332	2016	UCLA
2	Mike Anderson	254	1999	Fresno State
3	Eddie Johnson	248	1984	UTEP
4	Chris Fuamatu-Ma'afala	236	1996	UTEP
5	Del Rodgers	232	1981	Wyoming
6	Marty Johnson	229	2002	Indiana
	Devontae Booker	229	2014	Oregon State
8	Dameon Hunter	226	2001	Air Force
9	Eddie Johnson	224	1984	Colorado State
10	Devontae Booker	222	2015	California
	Joe Williams	222	2016	Indiana (bowl)

=== Rushing touchdowns ===
Career
Rk	Player	TDs	Years
1	Zack Moss	38	2016 2017 2018 2019
2	Del Rodgers	31	1978 1979 1980 1981
3	Tavion Thomas	28	2021 2022
4	Eddie Johnson	26	1984 1985 1986 1987 1988
5	Matt Asiata	24	2007 2008 2009 2010
6	Mark Stevens	23	1983 1984
	Eddie Wide	23	2007 2008 2009 2010
	John White	23	2011 2012
9	Juan Johnson	22	1994 1995 1996 1997
	Chris Fuamatu-Ma'afala	22	1995 1996 1997
	Mike Anderson	22	1998 1999 2000 2001

Single season
Rk	Player	TDs	Year
1	Tavion Thomas	21	2021
2	John White	15	2011
	Zack Moss	15	2019
4	Marty Johnson	14	2004
5	Del Rodgers	13	1981
	Mark Stevens	13	1984
7	Eddie Johnson	12	1988
	Mike Anderson	12	1998
	Adam Tate	12	2001
	Darrell Mack	12	2007
	Matt Asiata	12	2008

Single game
Rk	Player	TDs	Year	Opponent
1	Del Rodgers	4	1980	UTEP
	Eddie Johnson	4	1988	BYU
	Charlie Brown	4	1994	UTEP
	Juan Johnson	4	1996	Fresno State
	Mike Anderson	4	1999	UNLV
	Marty Johnson	4	2004	Air Force
	Joe Williams	4	2016	UCLA
	Tavion Thomas	4	2021	UCLA
	Tavion Thomas	4	2021	Stanford

== Receiving ==
=== Receptions ===
Career
Rk	Player	Rec	Years
1	Kevin Dyson	192	1994 1995 1996 1997
2	Britain Covey	184	2015 2018 2019 2020 2021
3	Brant Kuithe	183	2018 2019 2020 2021 2022 2024
4	Bryan Rowley	177	1989 1990 1991 1992
5	Dennis Smith	156	1986 1987 1988 1989
	Paris Warren	156	2003 2004
7	Jereme Brooks	152	2007 2008 2009 2010
8	Carl Harry	149	1986 1987 1988
9	Loren Richey	140	1985 1986
10	Travis LaTendresse	135	2002 2003 2004 2005
	Derrek Richards	135	2004 2005 2006 2007

Single season
Rk	Player	Rec	Year
1	David Reed	81	2009
2	Paris Warren	80	2004
3	Freddie Brown	77	2008
4	Paris Warren	76	2003
5	Loren Richey	73	1985
	Dennis Smith	73	1989
7	Dalton Kincaid	70	2022
8	Loren Richey	67	1986
	Steve Savoy	67	2004
10	Carl Harry	65	1988

Single game
Rk	Player	Rec	Year	Opponent
1	Loren Richey	17	1986	UTEP
2	Travis LaTendresse	16	2005	Georgia Tech
	Dalton Kincaid	16	2022	USC
4	Paris Warren	15	2004	Pittsburgh
5	Rodney Wells	14	1987	Idaho State
6	Danny Huey	13	1983	Wyoming
	Bryan Bero	13	1988	Idaho State
	Daniel Jones	13	1998	Fresno State
	Paris Jackson	13	2002	San Diego State
10	Lance Robbins	12	1972	Utah State
	Aaron Grimm	12	1988	Hawaii
	John Madsen	12	2005	Wyoming
	Freddie Brown	12	2008	Alabama

=== Receiving yards ===
Career
Rk	Player	Yards	Years
1	Bryan Rowley	3,143	1989 1990 1991 1992 1993
2	Kevin Dyson	2,726	1994 1995 1996 1997
3	Brant Kuithe	2,387	2018 2019 2020 2021 2022 2024
4	Carl Harry	2,283	1986 1987 1988
5	Dennis Smith	2,168	1986 1987 1988 1989
6	Dres Anderson	2,077	2011 2012 2013 2014
7	Britain Covey	2,011	2015 2018 2019 2020 2021
8	Paris Warren	1,885	2003 2004
9	James Teahan	1,872	1978 1979 1980 1981
10	Cliff Russell	1,862	1998 1999 2000 2001

Single season
Rk	Player	Yards	Year
1	David Reed	1,188	2009
2	Carl Harry	1,145	1988
3	Dennis Smith	1,091	1989
4	Paris Warren	1,076	2004
5	Bryan Rowley	1,011	1991
6	Louis Thomas	1,006	1968
7	Dres Anderson	1,002	2013
8	Loren Richey	971	1985
9	Steve Savoy	961	2004
10	Darren Carrington II	918	2017

Single game
Rk	Player	Yards	Year	Opponent
1	Carl Harry	255	1988	Idaho State
2	Dalton Kincaid	234	2022	USC
3	Travis LaTendresse	214	2005	Georgia Tech
4	Loren Richey	213	1986	UTEP
5	Bryan Rowley	200	1991	Hawaii
6	Danny Huey	199	1984	San Diego State
7	Paris Warren	198	2004	Pittsburgh
8	Daniel Jones	197	1998	Fresno State
9	Jack Steptoe	194	1976	New Mexico
10	Travis LaTendresse	192	2005	New Mexico

=== Receiving touchdowns ===
Career
Rk	Player	TDs	Years
1	Bryan Rowley	25	1989 1990 1991 1992 1993
2	Dennis Smith	24	1986 1987 1988 1989
3	Brant Kuithe	22	2018 2019 2020 2021 2022 2024
4	Carl Harry	20	1986 1987 1988
5	Steve Odom	19	1971 1972 1973
6	Kevin Dyson	18	1994 1995 1996 1997
	Steve Savoy	18	2003 2004
8	Jack Steptoe	17	1976 1977
	Brent Casteel	17	2005 2006 2007 2008
	Dres Anderson	17	2011 2012 2013 2014

Single season
Rk	Player	TDs	Year
1	Dennis Smith	18	1989
2	Carl Harry	14	1988
3	Paris Warren	12	2004
4	Steve Odom	11	1972
	Bryan Rowley	11	1991
	Curtis Marsh	11	1994
	Steve Savoy	11	2004
8	Brent Casteel	10	2006
9	Jack Steptoe	9	1976

Single game
Rk	Player	TDs	Year	Opponent
1	Dennis Smith	4	1989	Utah State
	Dennis Smith	4	1989	Air Force
	Travis LaTendresse	4	2005	Georgia Tech

== Total offense ==
Total offense is the sum of passing and rushing statistics. It does not include receiving or returns.

=== Total offense yards ===
Career
Rk	Player	Yards	Years
1	Scott Mitchell	8,836	1987 1988 1989
2	Brian Johnson	8,701	2004 2005 2007 2008
3	Travis Wilson	8,628	2012 2013 2014 2015
4	Tyler Huntley	8,497	2016 2017 2018 2019
5	Mike McCoy	7,559	1992 1993 1994
6	Cameron Rising	7,113	2020 2021 2022 2024
7	**Devon Dampier**	6,504	2025 2026
8	Alex Smith	6,313	2002 2003 2004
9	Larry Egger	5,515	1985 1986
10	Mike Fouts	4,891	1995 1996

Single season
Rk	Player	Yards	Year
1	Scott Mitchell	4,299	1988
2	Mike McCoy	3,969	1993
3	Alex Smith	3,583	2004
4	Cameron Rising	3,499	2022
5	Tyler Huntley	3,382	2019
6	Brian Johnson	3,370	2005
7	Devon Dampier	3,325	2025
8	**Devon Dampier**	3,180	2026
9	Scott Mitchell	3,133	1989
10	Mike McCoy	3,104	1994

Single game
Rk	Player	Yards	Year	Opponent
1	Scott Mitchell	614	1988	Air Force
2	Scott Mitchell	513	1988	Idaho State
3	Larry Egger	489	1986	UTEP
4	Brian Johnson	483	2005	San Diego State
5	Cameron Rising	475	2022	USC
6	Larry Egger	468	1986	Air Force
7	Mike McCoy	461	1993	BYU
8	Mike Fouts	458	1996	Kansas
	Devon Dampier	458	2025	Nebraska
10	Brian Johnson	451	2005	Wyoming

=== Touchdowns responsible for ===
"Touchdowns responsible for" is the official NCAA term for combined passing and rushing touchdowns.

Career
Rk	Player	TDs	Years
1	Travis Wilson	75	2012 2013 2014 2015
2	Scott Mitchell	72	1987 1988 1989
3	Brian Johnson	69	2004 2005 2007 2008
	**Devon Dampier**	69	2025 2026
5	Cameron Rising	65	2020 2021 2022 2024
6	Tyler Huntley	63	2016 2017 2018 2019
7	Alex Smith	62	2002 2003 2004
8	Don Van Galder	52	1971 1972 1973
9	Mike McCoy	51	1992 1993 1994
10	Mark Stevens	46	1983 1984

Single season
Rk	Player	TDs	Year
1	Alex Smith	42	2004
2	**Devon Dampier**	35	2026
3	Devon Dampier	34	2025
4	Scott Mitchell	33	1989
5	Cameron Rising	32	2022
6	Scott Mitchell	29	1988
7	Mike McCoy	29	1994
8	Brian Johnson	28	2008
9	Brian Johnson	26	2005
	Cameron Rising	26	2021

Single game
Rk	Player	TDs	Year	Opponent
1	Steve Marshall	7	1972	Colorado State
2	Ricky Hardin	6	1980	New Mexico
	Mark Stevens	6	1983	Wyoming
	Scott Mitchell	6	1989	Utah State
	Scott Mitchell	6	1989	UTEP

== Defense ==
=== Interceptions ===
Career
Rk	Player	Ints	Years
1	Harold Lusk	19	1993 1994 1995 1996
2	Eric Weddle	18	2003 2004 2005 2006
3	LaVon Edwards	17	1988 1989 1990 1991
4	Sean Knox	15	1987 1988 1989 1990
5	Jerry Pullman	13	1964 1965 1966
	Jeff Griffin	13	1977 1978 1979 1980
	Reggie Richardson	13	1982 1983 1984 1985
	Andre Dyson	13	1997 1998 1999 2000
	Robert Johnson	13	2007 2008 2009
10	Norm Thompson	12	1969 1970
	Ernest Boyd	12	1993 1994

Single season
Rk	Player	Ints	Year
1	C.D. Lowery	8	1964
2	Gil Tobler	7	1948
	Norm Thompson	7	1970
	Eric Jacobsen	7	1987
	Eric Weddle	7	2006

Single game
Rk	Player	Ints	Year	Opponent
1	Frank Nelson	4	1946	Colorado
2	Norm Thompson	3	1970	UTEP
	Clark Phillips	3	2022	Oregon State
	Eric Weddle	3	2006	San Diego State
	Robert Johnson	3	2009	Colorado State

=== Tackles ===
Career
Rk	Player	Tackles	Years
1	Mark Blosch	495	1981 1982 1983 1984
2	Mike Bailey	401	1975 1976 1977 1978
3	Bill Gompf	380	1978 1979 1980 1981
4	Eric Jacobsen	338	1984 1985 1986 1987 1988
5	John Huddleston	331	1974 1975
6	Garland Harris	324	1986 1987 1988 1989
7	Jay Fairman	322	1979 1980 1981 1982 1983
8	Greg Smith	308	1985 1986 1987 1988
9	Jeff Griffin	304	1977 1978 1979 1980
10	Spencer Toone	293	2003 2004 2005

Single season
Rk	Player	Tackles	Year
1	John Huddleston	174	1975
2	Mark Blosch	172	1982
3	Mark Blosch	162	1983
4	John Huddleston	157	1974
5	Bill Gompf	143	1979
6	Eric Jacobsen	141	1988
7	Reggie Alston	139	1991
8	Eric Jacobsen	138	1987
9	Mike Bailey	132	1977

Single game
Rk	Player	Tackles	Year	Opponent
1	Larry Stone	30	1968	Oregon State
2	Gary Keller	25	1968	Utah State
3	Elliott Hagood	23	1970	New Mexico
	Elliott Hagood	23	1972	Arizona
	Gary Keller	23	1973	New Mexico
	John Huddleston	23	1975	Utah State
	Mark Jackson	23	1985	New Mexico
8	Larry Stone	22	1968	Utah State
9	Fred McFarren	21	1968	Oregon State
	Elliott Hagood	21	1972	New Mexico

=== Sacks ===
Career
Rk	Player	Sacks	Years
1	Bradlee Anae	30.0	2016 2017 2018 2019
2	Hunter Dimick	29.5	2013 2014 2015 2016
3	John Frank	27.0	1996 1997 1998 1999
4	Filipo Mokofisi	26.0	1982 1983 1984 1985
5	Jeff Reyes	25.0	1980 1981 1982 1983
	Jimmy Bellamy	25.0	1990 1991
	Nate Orchard	25.0	2011 2012 2013 2014
8	Steve Clark	20.0	1978 1979 1980 1981
9	Van Fillinger	19.5	2020 2021 2022 2023 2024
10	Jason Kaufusi	19.0	2000 2001 2002

Single season
Rk	Player	Sacks	Year
1	Nate Orchard	18.5	2014
2	Jimmy Bellamy	15.0	1991
3	Hunter Dimick	14.5	2016
4	Jeff Reyes	14.0	1983
5	John Frank	13.0	1999
	Bradlee Anae	13.0	2019
7	Steve Clark	12.0	1981
	Bronzell Miller	12.0	1994
	Jonah Elliss	12.0	2023
10	John Henry Daley	11.5	2025

Single game
Rk	Player	Sacks	Year	Opponent
1	Hunter Dimick	5.0	2016	Arizona State
2	Jeff Reyes	4.0	1983	Hawaii
	Kevin Polston	4.0	1985	Utah State
	John Frank	4.0	1999	Boise State
	Paul Kruger	4.0	2008	Utah State
	Nate Orchard	4.0	2014	UCLA
	Vilis Fauonuku	4.0	2015	Colorado
8	Nate Orchard	3.5	2014	Stanford
	Jonah Elliss	3.5	2023	UCLA

== Kicking ==
=== Field goals made ===
Career
Rk	Player	FGs	Years
1	Andy Phillips	84	2013 2014 2015 2016
2	Louie Sakoda	57	2005 2006 2007 2008
3	Matt Gay	56	2017 2018
4	Chris Yergensen	44	1991 1992 1993
5	Daniel Pulsipher	35	1994 1995 1996
6	Andre Guardi	34	1983 1984 1985 1986
7	Joe Phillips	33	2009 2010
	Cole Becker	33	2023 2024
9	Jadon Redding	32	2019 2020 2021 2022
10	Wayne Lammle	26	1987 1988 1989 1990
	Coleman Petersen	26	2011 2012

Single season
Rk	Player	FGs	Year
1	Matt Gay	30	2017
2	Matt Gay	26	2018
3	Andy Phillips	23	2014
	Andy Phillips	23	2015
5	Louie Sakoda	22	2008
6	Andy Phillips	21	2016
7	Joe Phillips	20	2009
8	Louie Sakoda	19	2007
9	Andre Guardi	18	1985
	Coleman Petersen	18	2011
	Cole Becker	18	2024

Single game
Rk	Player	FGs	Year	Opponent
1	Matt Gay	6	2018	Oregon
2	Joe Phillips	5	2009	BYU
3	Matt Gay	4	2018	Stanford
	Matt Gay	4	2017	BYU
	Matt Gay	4	2017	San Jose State
	Andre Guardi	4	1985	Colorado State
	Tim Wagstaff	4	1988	Colorado State
	Wayne Lammle	4	1989	New Mexico
	Dan Pulsipher	4	1995	Utah State
	Bryan Borreson	4	2002	Indiana
	Louie Sakoda	4	2006	Tulsa
	Louie Sakoda	4	2008	Michigan
	Joe Phillips	4	2010	Iowa State
	Coleman Petersen	4	2011	Pittsburgh
	Andy Phillips	4	2014	Michigan
	Cole Becker	4	2024	Arizona State

=== Field goal percentage ===
Career
Rk	Player	FG%	Years
1	Louie Sakoda	86.4%	2005 2006 2007 2008
2	Matt Gay	86.2%	2017 2018
3	Joe Phillips	84.6%	2009 2010
4	Andy Phillips	84.0%	2013 2014 2015 2016
5	Cole Becker	78.6%	2023 2024
6	Jadon Redding	78.0%	2019 2020 2021 2022
7	Dillon Curtis	73.3%	2025
8	Scott Lieber	70.0%	1985 1986 1987 1988
9	Andre Guardi	69.4%	1983 1984 1985 1986
10	Coleman Petersen	68.4%	2011 2012

Single season
Rk	Player	FG%	Year
1	Jadon Redding	100.0%	2020
2	Scott Lieber	93.3%	1987
3	Louie Sakoda	91.7%	2008
4	Joe Phillips	90.9%	2009
5	Louie Sakoda	86.4%	2007
6	Andy Phillips	85.2%	2015
7	Andy Phillips	85.0%	2013
8	Dan Beardall	84.2%	2005
9	Andy Phillips	84.0%	2016
10	Cole Becker	83.3%	2023
