= Fiesta Bowl =

Annual American college football postseason game

- Vrbo Fiesta Bowl
- Stadium: State Farm Stadium
- Location: Glendale, Arizona
- Previous stadiums: Sun Devil Stadium (1971–2006)
- Previous locations: Tempe, Arizona (1971–2006)
- Operated: since 1971
- Championship affiliation: CFP (since 2014); BCS (1998–2013); Bowl Alliance (1995–1997); Bowl Coalition (1992–1994)
- Previous conference tie-ins: WAC (1971–1978); Big 12 (1997–2013)
- Payout: US$17 million (as of 2009)
- Website: fiestabowl.org

Sponsors
- Sunkist (1986–1990); IBM (1993–1995); Tostitos (1996–January 2014); Vizio (December 2014); BattleFrog (January 2016); PlayStation (December 2016–2022); Vrbo (since 2022)

Former names
- Fiesta Bowl (1971–1985, 1991–1992); Sunkist Fiesta Bowl (1986–1990); IBM OS/2 Fiesta Bowl (1993–1995); Tostitos Fiesta Bowl (1996–January 2014); Vizio Fiesta Bowl (December 2014); BattleFrog Fiesta Bowl (January 2016); PlayStation Fiesta Bowl (2016–2022)

2026 matchup
- Ole Miss vs. Miami (FL) (Miami 31–27)

The Fiesta Bowl is an annual American college football bowl game played in the Phoenix metropolitan area since 1971.

From its beginning until 2006, the game was hosted at Sun Devil Stadium in Tempe, Arizona. Since 2007, the game has been played at State Farm Stadium in Glendale, Arizona. Since 2022, it has been sponsored by Vrbo and officially known as the Vrbo Fiesta Bowl. Previous sponsors include PlayStation (December 2016–2022), BattleFrog (January 2016), Vizio (December 2014), Tostitos (1996–January 2014), IBM (1993–1995) and Sunkist (1986–1990).

Unlike other major bowls, the Fiesta Bowl has not always had major conference tie-ins. For the first nine editions, the Western Athletic Conference champion was invited to the bowl. In 1997, the Fiesta Bowl agreed to invite the champion of the newly-formed Big 12 Conference; the tie-in continued until 2014 when the Big 12 moved to the Sugar Bowl. During the late 1980s, the Fiesta Bowl used its lack of tie-ins to create two de facto national championship games between independents or teams from conferences without mandatory bowl obligations. These games increased the Fiesta Bowl's stature.

Beginning in 1992, the Fiesta Bowl joined with several other bowls to create the Bowl Coalition in an effort to produce an undisputed national champion in college football. It subsequently was part of the Bowl Alliance and Bowl Championship Series. From 1992 to 2006, the Fiesta Bowl served as the national championship game of these systems in 1996, 1999, and 2002. The Phoenix metropolitan area and the Fiesta Bowl Committee hosted the BCS National Championship Game in 2007 and 2011 in addition to the regular Fiesta Bowl game.

In 2014, the Fiesta Bowl, along with the "New Year's Six" bowls, became a part of the College Football Playoff. As part of the four team playoff from 2014 to 2023, the Fiesta Bowl served as a semifinal game in 2016, 2019, and 2022.

With the expansion of the College Football Playoff to twelve teams in the 2024–25 season, the Fiesta Bowl serves as either a quarterfinal or semifinal. It was the quarterfinal for the 2024 season and will be the semifinal for the 2025 season. While a semifinal, the game will be played one week after New Year's Day.

The Fiesta Bowl has donated over $12 million to charity. In 2020, it donated $1 million in emergency relief during the COVID-19 pandemic.

The current public address announcer of the Fiesta Bowl, as well as State Farm Stadium, is Jim Barnett, who has also served as pregame announcer for the three Super Bowls played at the stadium and was the announcer of the 2015 Pro Bowl.

== History ==
=== Origins ===
Fiesta Bowl logo with no corporate sponsor

The Fiesta Bowl was born from the Western Athletic Conference's frustrated attempts to obtain bowl invitations for its champions. In 1968 and 1969 respectively, champions Wyoming and Arizona State failed to secure any bowl selection. The next year, undefeated Arizona State was bypassed by the major bowls and had to settle for an appearance in the less prestigious Peach Bowl. The Fiesta Bowl therefore initially provided an automatic berth for the WAC champion.

=== 1970s ===
In its first decade of existence, the Fiesta Bowl was played in the last week of December (including the afternoon of Christmas Day from 1976 to 1979). The 1971 inaugural game featured another top-ten Arizona State squad against top-twenty opponent Florida State. The 1974 game featured WAC champ BYU and their new coach, future Hall of Fame member LaVell Edwards in their first-ever bowl game vs. Oklahoma State. BYU was in control until BYU's first All-American quarterback Gary Sheide went down with a leg injury and eventually lost 16–6. By 1975, the game was able to attract Big Eight co-champion Nebraska to play undefeated Arizona State in a matchup of top-five teams. In 1977, the game was again able to attract a top-five opponent in Penn State, despite WAC champion #16 BYU refusing to play in the bowl due to its being held on Sunday.

In 1978, Arizona and Arizona State both joined the Pac-10 Conference and the Fiesta Bowl's tie-in with the WAC ended, so its champ went to the newly inaugurated Holiday Bowl. From then until the advent of the Bowl Coalition in 1992, Fiesta Bowl matchups typically featured runners-up of major conferences and/or major independents.

=== 1980s ===
The game continued to attract high quality matchups. Beginning with the 1981 season, it shifted to New Year's Day alongside the major bowl games—the Cotton, Orange, Sugar, and Rose. At the time, NBC had the broadcast rights to the Fiesta, Rose, and Orange; the Fiesta was played first and had a late morning kickoff (11:30 a.m. MST). It was the first bowl game to acquire a corporate title sponsor, via an agreement with Sunkist Growers in September 1985, making the game the "Sunkist Fiesta Bowl" starting with the January 1986 edition. The Tangerine Bowl had previously reached agreement in March 1983 with the Florida Citrus Commission, a state government agency, to rename itself as the Florida Citrus Bowl.

A major breakthrough occurred after the 1986 season when the top two teams in the country, Miami and Penn State, agreed to play for the de facto national championship in the Fiesta Bowl. At the time, the traditional four "major" bowl games granted automatic bids to their conference champions. Both Miami and Penn State were independents at that time, and were thus free to choose a bowl. As such, the Fiesta Bowl and the Florida Citrus Bowl, each free from the obligation of conference tie-ins, vied to host the Miami–Penn State matchup in order to ensure that they would meet on the field. The Fiesta Bowl won the bidding and the game was set to be played on Friday, January 2, 1987—the night after the "big four" bowls of New Year's Day. Penn State won 14–10, and the game drew the largest television audience in the history of college football at the time. Two years later, #1 Notre Dame played undefeated #3 West Virginia for the national championship at the 1989 Fiesta Bowl on January 1.

The 1987 and 1989 games were two of four straight matchups of teams ranked in the AP Top 10 going into the bowl season to close out the 1980s. This significantly increased the Fiesta Bowl's prestige, to the point that it was now considered a major bowl by many fans and pundits. The 1988 game returned to New Year's Day, and the 1989 game kicked off three hours later (2:30 p.m. MST on NBC) and opposite the Rose Bowl, which had switched networks to ABC.

=== 1990s ===
Before the 1991 game, several major universities declined invitations due to the State of Arizona's decision at that time not to adopt the Martin Luther King Holiday. However, in 1992, the Fiesta Bowl was invited to participate in the Bowl Coalition, a predecessor to the Bowl Championship Series. This assured the game would feature major conference champions or prestigious runners-up and cemented its status as a major bowl. Had the two top-ranked teams in the Bowl Coalition not come from the SEC, Big Eight or SWC, the Fiesta Bowl would have hosted the Bowl Coalition's "national championship game," though this never happened during the three years of the Bowl Coalition's run.

When the Bowl Coalition was reconfigured as the Bowl Alliance for the 1995 season, the Fiesta was included as one of the three top games. In that season, it hosted the Bowl Alliance National Championship game featuring undefeated #1 Nebraska playing undefeated #2 Florida for the national championship. Nebraska won the game 62–24, the largest win margin in the history of the national championship game, and the most points ever scored in a national championship game. Finally, with the addition of the Big Ten and Pac-10 conferences to the new Bowl Championship Series, the Fiesta Bowl became a permanent fixture in the four-year BCS National Championship Game rotation. In 1998, the Fiesta Bowl featured the first BCS National Championship Game, which Tennessee won over Florida State, 23–16.

Starting with the 1999 season, the Big 12 Conference champion received an automatic bid to the Fiesta Bowl in years when it was not slated as the BCS title game, an arrangement that continued to the end of the BCS era.

=== 2000s ===
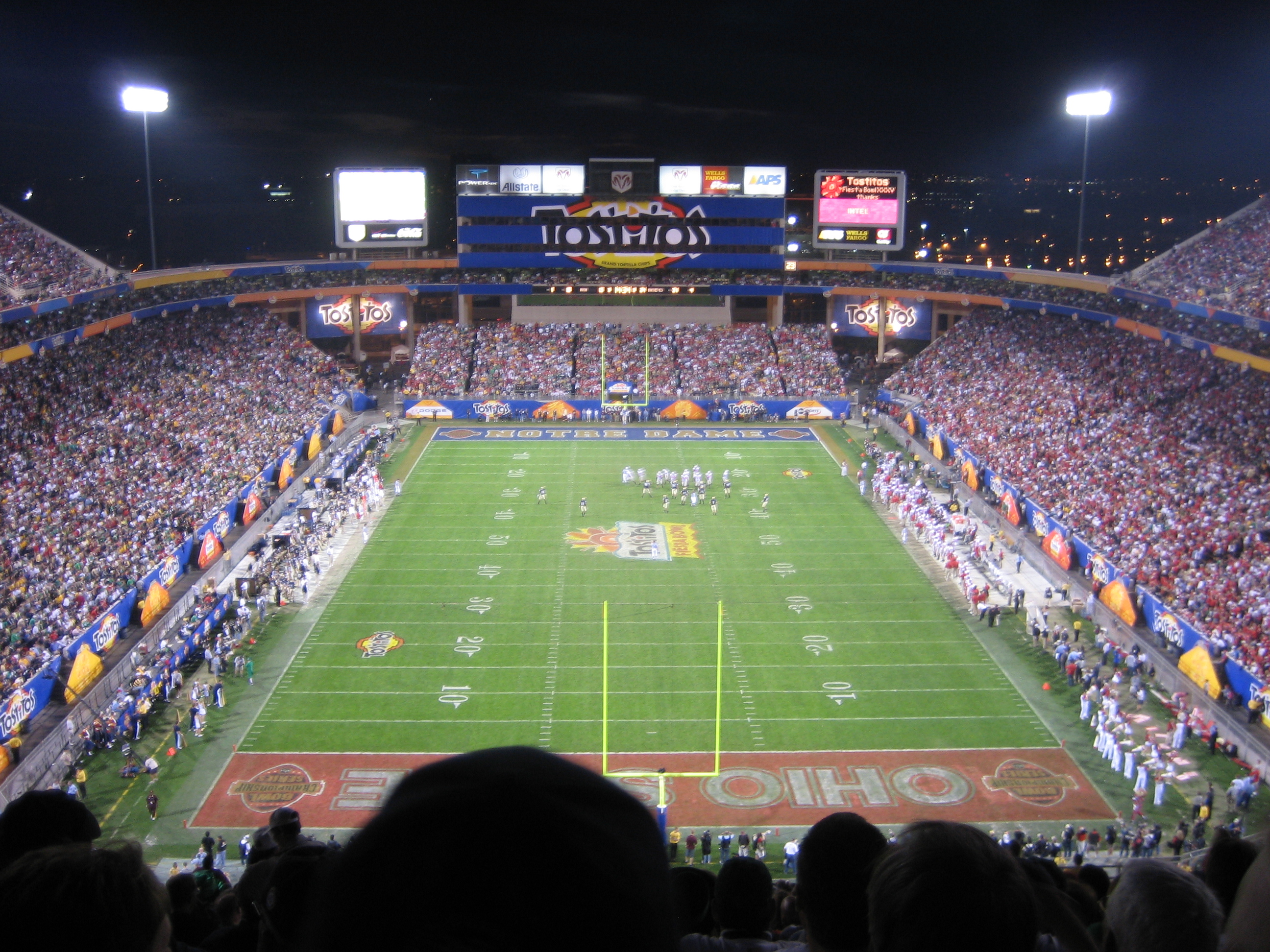
2006 Fiesta Bowl, the last Fiesta Bowl game in Sun Devil Stadium

In 2002, the Fiesta Bowl had the right to take the Pac-10 Conference Champion, should that team not reach the Rose Bowl, which served as the national championship game that season. Oregon failed to qualify for the championship game, and thus played Colorado in the Fiesta Bowl. A similar arrangement was made for the 2006 Fiesta Bowl. However, instead of gaining the Pac-10 Conference champion in addition to their usual tie-in with the Big 12, the Fiesta Bowl would have had a choice of the two teams. This turned out to be a moot point as both the Big 12 champion Texas and Pac-10 champion Southern California qualified for the National Championship Game (USC's participation has since been vacated).

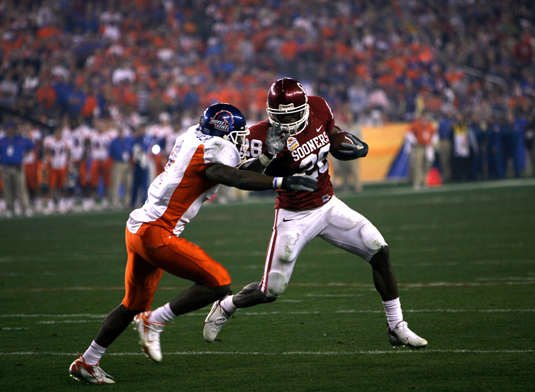
2007 Fiesta Bowl, Boise State vs. Oklahoma; January 1, 2007, the first Fiesta Bowl at University of Phoenix Stadium

The BCS National Championship game returned to the Fiesta Bowl in 2003 with the Big Ten champions Ohio State Buckeyes beating the Big East champions Miami Hurricanes in the first overtime national championship game. The game went into double overtime with the Buckeyes coming out on top 31–24 to claim the 2002 national championship.

The Fiesta Bowl was the first BCS bowl to have had a team from outside the automatic qualifying (AQ) BCS conferences (the Big 12, Big Ten, Atlantic Coast Conference (ACC), Southeastern Conference (SEC), Pac-10, Big East, and Notre Dame). The 2005 game saw undefeated Utah from the Mountain West Conference become the first BCS non-AQ school ever to play in a BCS game, easily defeating Big East champion Pittsburgh 35–7.

In 2007, the Fiesta Bowl game was played for the first time at the new then-named University of Phoenix Stadium in Glendale, across the Phoenix metropolitan area from Sun Devil Stadium. The undefeated Boise State Broncos won by defeating the Oklahoma Sooners 43–42 in overtime. It has been called one of the greatest college football games ever played, due to the combination of an underdog team, trick plays, comebacks by each team, and a thrilling overtime finish.

=== 2010s ===
The 2010 Fiesta Bowl featured #6 Boise State defeating #4 TCU, 17–10. It was the first time a BCS bowl matched-up two non-automatic qualifying teams (i.e. two teams from conferences without automatic BCS bids) and the first time that two teams who went undefeated faced each other in a BCS game outside of the national championship. In the 2012 Fiesta Bowl, Oklahoma State defeated Stanford 41–38. Notable players included Brandon Weeden and Justin Blackmon for Oklahoma State, and Andrew Luck for Stanford.

In November 2016, PlayStation was announced as the bowl's new title sponsor.

The December 2016, December 2019, December 2022, and January 2026 editions served as a semifinal for the College Football Playoff. The Fiesta Bowl is expected to next host a semifinal, alongside the Peach Bowl, in January 2029.

=== 2020s ===
The 50th edition of the Fiesta Bowl featured #10 Iowa State defeating #25 Oregon Ducks, 34–17. The game was behind closed doors due to the COVID-19 pandemic in Arizona, with only players' family members admitted. In the 2022 Fiesta Bowl, Oklahoma State rallied from a 28–7 deficit late in the second quarter to defeat Notre Dame, 37–35. In the December edition of that game (which was also a CFP semifinal), #3 TCU defeated #2 Michigan, 51–45, the highest scoring game in Fiesta Bowl history, and the second-highest scoring CFP semifinal game. In the 2026 Fiesta Bowl, the tenth–ranked Miami Hurricanes upset the sixth–ranked Ole Miss Rebels, 31–27, in the CFP semifinals.

== Controversies ==
=== Invitations ===
In 1996, a group of students from Brigham Young University, led by BYU professor Dennis Martin, burned bags of Tostitos tortilla chips in a bonfire and called for a boycott of all Tostitos products. This came after #5 ranked BYU was not invited to play in the 1997 Fiesta Bowl in favor of #7 ranked Penn State. This event is one of those referred to by proponents of college football implementing a playoff series rather than the controversial Bowl Alliance. Penn State went on to win the game over #20 Texas, 38–15, while BYU defeated #14 Kansas State in the Cotton Bowl Classic, 19–15.

For the 2010 Fiesta Bowl, the selections of TCU and Boise State caused a deep controversy. For the first and only time in the BCS era, two BCS non-AQ teams were chosen to play in BCS bowls in the same bowl season: however, they ended up facing each other. Because the two non-AQ teams were placed in the same bowl game, the bowl was derisively referred to as the "Separate But Equal Bowl", the "Quarantine Bowl", the "Fiasco Bowl", the "BCS Kids' Table", etc. Some had called for a boycott because of this arrangement. There was wide speculation that the BCS selection committees maneuvered TCU and Boise State into the same bowl so as to deny them a chance to embarrass two AQ conference representatives in separate bowls, as Boise State had done in the 2007 Fiesta Bowl and Utah had done in the 2005 Fiesta Bowl and 2009 Sugar Bowl (prior to the game, non-AQ teams were 3–1 versus AQ teams in BCS bowls). In response, Fiesta Bowl CEO John Junker called those allegations "the biggest load of crap that I've ever heard in my life" and said that "We're in the business of doing things that are on behalf of our bowl game and we don't do the bidding of someone else to our detriment." Beyond the unappealing nature of a major bowl contest hosting two programs then perceived as underdogs, the appeal was further diminished as it was a rematch of the 2008 Poinsettia Bowl from the previous bowl season.

=== Financial scandals ===
In 2009, in the weeks prior to the 2010 Fiesta Bowl, past and present Fiesta Bowl employees alleged that they were encouraged to help maintain its position as one of the four BCS bowls by making campaign contributions to politicians friendly to the Fiesta Bowl, with those contributions subsequently reimbursed to the employees. If the allegations were true, this would have been a violation of both state and federal campaign finance laws. Furthermore, as a non-profit organization, the Fiesta Bowl is prohibited from making political contributions of any kind. The Fiesta Bowl commissioned an "independent review" which found "no credible evidence that the bowl's management engaged in any type of illegal or unethical conduct."

The following year, in a November 2010 article, Sports Illustrated reported that Fiesta Bowl officials, including bowl CEO John Junker, had spent $4 million since 2000 to curry favor from BCS bigwigs and elected officials, including a 2008 "Fiesta Frolic", a golf-centered gathering of athletic directors and head coaches. The journal also reported that Junker's annual salary was close to $600,000 and that the bowl in 2007 turned an $11.6 million profit. While these alleged activities are not illegal, they did result in considerable damage to the reputation of the Fiesta Bowl.

On March 29, 2011, the Fiesta Bowl Board of Directors released a 276-page "scathing internal report", commissioned by them to re-examine the accusations of illegal political activities. The commission determined that $46,539 of illegal campaign contributions were made and the board immediately fired Fiesta Bowl CEO John Junker, who had already been suspended pending the results of this investigation. The scandal threatened the Fiesta Bowl's status as a BCS game, as the BCS said it might replace the bowl in its lineup if officials could not convince them it should remain. The BCS ultimately chose not to expel the Fiesta Bowl, instead fining the organization $1 million.

In June 2011 University of Arizona president Robert Shelton was hired to replace Junker. On February 22, 2012, ex-CEO John Junker pleaded guilty to a federal felony charge in the campaign financing matter, and two members of his former staff pleaded guilty to misdemeanor charges. Junker faced up to 2.5 years in prison as the result of his plea, but his sentencing was repeatedly postponed in return for cooperation in other cases. On March 13, 2014, Junker was sentenced to eight months in prison, starting on June 13, 2014; he was released on February 11, 2015. On March 20, 2014, Junker was sentenced to three years of probation on state charges.

== Parade ==
One of the Fiesta Bowl events, the annual Fiesta Bowl Parade, takes place along Central Avenue in Phoenix. It features marching bands from high schools as well as the two universities participating in the Fiesta Bowl, and the two universities participating in the Cactus Bowl, along with floats, equestrian units, and a seven-member queen and court. The parade began in 1973. Grand Marshals include celebrities from sports and entertainment.

In 2018, the parade sponsor changed from Bank of Arizona to Desert Financial Credit Union. Appearances in the 2018 parade included Cindy McCain and the marching band from Salem High School in Salem, New Hampshire, which was the group that had traveled the farthest for the parade. In 2026, the parade sponsor was Lerner & Rowe, a Phoenix law firm, and the grand marshal was WWE star Nikki Bella.

== Game results ==
All rankings are taken from the AP poll (inaugurated in 1936), before each game was played. Italics denote a tie game.

Date played	Winning team		Losing team		Attendance	Notes
December 27, 1971	No. 8 Arizona State	45	Florida State	38	51,089	notes
December 23, 1972	No. 15 Arizona State	49	Missouri	35	51,318	notes
December 21, 1973	No. 10 Arizona State	28	Pittsburgh	7	50,878	notes
December 28, 1974	Oklahoma State	16	No. 17 BYU	6	50,878	notes
December 26, 1975	No. 7 Arizona State	17	No. 6 Nebraska	14	51,396	notes
December 25, 1976	No. 8 Oklahoma	41	Wyoming	7	48,174	notes
December 25, 1977	No. 8 Penn State	42	No. 15 Arizona State	30	57,727	notes
December 25, 1978	No. 8 Arkansas	10	No. 15 UCLA	10	55,227	notes
December 25, 1979	No. 10 Pittsburgh	16	Arizona	10	55,347	notes
December 26, 1980	No. 10 Penn State	31	No. 11 Ohio State	19	66,738	notes
January 1, 1982	No. 7 Penn State	26	No. 8 USC	10	71,053	notes
January 1, 1983	No. 11 Arizona State	32	No. 12 Oklahoma	21	70,533	notes
January 2, 1984	No. 14 Ohio State	28	No. 15 Pittsburgh	23	66,484	notes
January 1, 1985	No. 14 UCLA	39	No. 13 Miami (FL)	37	60,310	notes
January 1, 1986	No. 5 Michigan	27	No. 7 Nebraska	23	72,454	notes
January 2, 1987^{NCG}	No. 2 Penn State	14	No. 1 Miami (FL)	10	73,098	notes
January 1, 1988	No. 3 Florida State	31	No. 5 Nebraska	28	72,112	notes
January 2, 1989^{NCG}	No. 1 Notre Dame	34	No. 3 West Virginia	21	74,911	notes
January 1, 1990	No. 5 Florida State	41	No. 6 Nebraska	17	73,953	notes
January 1, 1991	No. 18 Louisville	34	No. 25 Alabama	7	69,098	notes
January 1, 1992	No. 6 Penn State	42	No. 10 Tennessee	17	71,133	notes
January 1, 1993	No. 6 Syracuse	26	No. 10 Colorado	22	70,224	notes
January 1, 1994	No. 16 Arizona	29	No. 10 Miami (FL)	0	72,260	notes
January 2, 1995	No. 4 Colorado	41	Notre Dame	24	73,968	notes
January 2, 1996^{BA}	No. 1 Nebraska	62	No. 2 Florida	24	79,864	notes
January 1, 1997	No. 7 Penn State	38	No. 20 Texas	15	65,106	notes
December 31, 1997	No. 10 Kansas State	35	No. 14 Syracuse	18	69,367	notes
January 4, 1999^{BCS}	No. 1 Tennessee	23	No. 2 Florida State	16	80,470	notes
January 2, 2000	No. 3 Nebraska	31	No. 6 Tennessee	21	71,526	notes
January 1, 2001	No. 5 Oregon State	41	No. 10 Notre Dame	9	75,428	notes
January 1, 2002	No. 2 Oregon	38	No. 3 Colorado	16	74,118	notes
January 3, 2003^{BCS}	No. 2 Ohio State	31	No. 1 Miami (FL)	24^{(2OT)}	77,502	notes
January 2, 2004	No. 7 Ohio State	35	No. 8 Kansas State	28	73,425	notes
January 1, 2005	No. 5 Utah	35	No. 19 Pittsburgh	7	73,519	notes
January 2, 2006	No. 4 Ohio State	34	No. 5 Notre Dame	20	76,196	notes
January 1, 2007	No. 9 Boise State	43	No. 7 Oklahoma	42^{(OT)}	73,719	notes
January 2, 2008	No. 11 West Virginia	48	No. 3 Oklahoma	28	70,016	notes
January 5, 2009	No. 3 Texas	24	No. 10 Ohio State	21	72,047	notes
January 4, 2010	No. 6 Boise State	17	No. 3 TCU	10	73,227	notes
January 1, 2011	No. 9 Oklahoma	48	No. 25 Connecticut	20	67,232	notes
January 2, 2012	No. 3 Oklahoma State	41	No. 4 Stanford	38^{(OT)}	69,927	notes
January 3, 2013	No. 5 Oregon	35	No. 7 Kansas State	17	70,242	notes
January 1, 2014	No. 15 UCF	52	No. 6 Baylor	42	65,172	notes
December 31, 2014	No. 21 Boise State	38	No. 12 Arizona	30	66,896	notes
January 1, 2016	No. 7 Ohio State	44	No. 8 Notre Dame	28	71,123	notes
December 31, 2016^{SF}	No. 3 Clemson	31	No. 2 Ohio State	0	70,236	notes
December 30, 2017	No. 9 Penn State	35	No. 12 Washington	28	61,842	notes
January 1, 2019	No. 11 LSU	40	No. 7 UCF	32	69,927	notes
December 28, 2019^{SF}	No. 3 Clemson	29	No. 2 Ohio State	23	71,330	notes
January 2, 2021	No. 12 Iowa State	34	No. 25 Oregon	17	0	notes
January 1, 2022	No. 9 Oklahoma State	37	No. 5 Notre Dame	35	49,550	notes
December 31, 2022^{SF}	No. 3 TCU	51	No. 2 Michigan	45	71,723	notes
January 1, 2024	No. 8 Oregon	45	No. 18 Liberty	6	47,769	notes
December 31, 2024^{QF}	No. 5 Penn State	31	No. 8 Boise State	14	63,854	notes
January 8, 2026^{SF}	No. 10 Miami (FL)	31	No. 6 Ole Miss	27	67,928	notes

^NCG denotes de-facto national championship games for the consensus national championship.
^BAdenotes Bowl Alliance Championship Game
^BCSdenotes BCS National Championship Game
^QFdenotes College Football Playoff quarterfinal game
^SFdenotes College Football Playoff semifinal game

== MVPs ==
An offensive MVP and defensive MVP are selected for each game.

Date played	MVPs	Team	Position
December 27, 1971	Gary Huff	Florida State	QB
December 27, 1971	Junior Ah You	Arizona State	DE
December 23, 1972	Woody Green	Arizona State	HB
December 23, 1972	Mike Fink	Missouri	DB
December 21, 1973	Greg Hudson	Arizona State	SE
December 21, 1973	Mike Haynes	Arizona State	CB
December 28, 1974	Kenny Walker	Oklahoma State	RB
December 28, 1974	Phil Dokes	Oklahoma State	DT
December 26, 1975	John Jefferson	Arizona State	WR
December 26, 1975	Larry Gordon	Arizona State	LB
December 25, 1976	Thomas Lott	Oklahoma	QB
December 25, 1976	Terry Peters	Oklahoma	CB
December 25, 1977	Matt Millen	Penn State	LB
December 25, 1977	Dennis Sproul	Arizona State	QB
December 25, 1978	James Owens	UCLA	RB
December 25, 1978	Jimmy Walker	Arkansas	DT
December 25, 1979	Mark Schubert	Pittsburgh	K
December 25, 1979	Dave Liggins	Arizona	S
December 26, 1980	Curt Warner	Penn State	RB
December 26, 1980	Frank Case	Penn State	DE
January 1, 1982	Curt Warner	Penn State	RB
January 1, 1982	Leo Wisniewski	Penn State	NT
January 1, 1983	Marcus Dupree	Oklahoma	RB
January 1, 1983	Jim Jeffcoat	Arizona State	DL
January 2, 1984	John Congemi	Pittsburgh	QB
January 2, 1984	Rowland Tatum	Ohio State	LB
January 1, 1985	Gaston Green	UCLA	TB
January 1, 1985	James Washington	UCLA	DB
January 1, 1986	Jamie Morris	Michigan	RB
January 1, 1986	Mark Messner	Michigan	DT
January 2, 1987	D.J. Dozier	Penn State	RB
January 2, 1987	Shane Conlan	Penn State	LB
January 1, 1988	Danny McManus	Florida State	QB
January 1, 1988	Neil Smith	Nebraska	DL
January 2, 1989	Tony Rice	Notre Dame	QB
January 2, 1989	Frank Stams	Notre Dame	DE
January 1, 1990	Peter Tom Willis	Florida State	QB
January 1, 1990	Odell Haggins	Florida State	NG
January 1, 1991	Browning Nagle	Louisville	QB
January 1, 1991	Ray Buchanan	Louisville	FS
January 1, 1992	O.J. McDuffie	Penn State	WR
January 1, 1992	Reggie Givens	Penn State	OLB
January 1, 1993	Marvin Graves	Syracuse	QB
January 1, 1993	Kevin Mitchell	Syracuse	NG
January 1, 1994	Chuck Levy	Arizona	RB
January 1, 1994	Tedy Bruschi	Arizona	DE
January 2, 1995	Kordell Stewart	Colorado	QB
January 2, 1995	Shannon Clavelle	Colorado	DT
January 2, 1996	Tommie Frazier	Nebraska	QB
January 2, 1996	Michael Booker	Nebraska	CB
January 1, 1997	Curtis Enis	Penn State	TB
January 1, 1997	Brandon Noble	Penn State	DT
December 31, 1997	Michael Bishop	Kansas State	QB
December 31, 1997	Travis Ochs	Kansas State	LB
January 4, 1999	Peerless Price	Tennessee	WR
January 4, 1999	Dwayne Goodrich	Tennessee	CB

Date played	MVPs	Team	Position
January 2, 2000	Eric Crouch	Nebraska	QB
January 2, 2000	Mike Brown	Nebraska	DB
January 1, 2001	Jonathan Smith	Oregon State	QB
January 1, 2001	Darnell Robinson	Oregon State	LB
January 1, 2002	Joey Harrington	Oregon	QB
January 1, 2002	Steve Smith	Oregon	DB
January 3, 2003	Craig Krenzel	Ohio State	QB
January 3, 2003	Mike Doss	Ohio State	SS
January 2, 2004	Craig Krenzel	Ohio State	QB
January 2, 2004	A. J. Hawk	Ohio State	OLB
January 1, 2005	Alex Smith	Utah	QB
January 1, 2005	Paris Warren	Utah	WR
January 1, 2005	Steve Fifita	Utah	NG
January 2, 2006	Troy Smith	Ohio State	QB
January 2, 2006	A. J. Hawk	Ohio State	OLB
January 1, 2007	Jared Zabransky	Boise State	QB
January 1, 2007	Marty Tadman	Boise State	S
January 2, 2008	Pat White	West Virginia	QB
January 2, 2008	Reed Williams	West Virginia	OLB
January 5, 2009	Colt McCoy	Texas	QB
January 5, 2009	Roy Miller	Texas	DT
January 4, 2010	Kyle Efaw	Boise State	TE
January 4, 2010	Brandyn Thompson	Boise State	CB
January 1, 2011	Landry Jones	Oklahoma	QB
January 1, 2011	Jamell Fleming	Oklahoma	CB
January 2, 2012	Justin Blackmon	Oklahoma State	WR
January 2, 2012	Justin Gilbert	Oklahoma State	CB
January 3, 2013	Marcus Mariota	Oregon	QB
January 3, 2013	Michael Clay	Oregon	LB
January 1, 2014	Blake Bortles	UCF	QB
January 1, 2014	Terrance Plummer	UCF	LB
December 31, 2014	Thomas Sperbeck	Boise State	WR
December 31, 2014	Tanner Vallejo	Boise State	LB
January 1, 2016	J. T. Barrett	Ohio State	QB
January 1, 2016	Eli Apple	Ohio State	CB
December 31, 2016	Deshaun Watson	Clemson	QB
December 31, 2016	Clelin Ferrell	Clemson	DE
December 30, 2017	Trace McSorley	Penn State	QB
December 30, 2017	Marcus Allen	Penn State	S
January 1, 2019	Joe Burrow	LSU	QB
January 1, 2019	Rashard Lawrence	LSU	DL
December 28, 2019	Trevor Lawrence	Clemson	QB
December 28, 2019	Chad Smith	Clemson	LB
January 2, 2021	Brock Purdy	Iowa State	QB
January 2, 2021	O'Rien Vance	Iowa State	LB
January 1, 2022	Spencer Sanders	Oklahoma State	QB
January 1, 2022	Malcolm Rodriguez	Oklahoma State	LB
December 31, 2022	Quentin Johnston	TCU	WR
December 31, 2022	Dee Winters	TCU	LB
January 1, 2024	Bo Nix	Oregon	QB
January 1, 2024	Jeffrey Bassa	Oregon	LB
December 31, 2024	Tyler Warren	Penn State	TE
December 31, 2024	Zakee Wheatley	Penn State	S
January 8, 2026	Carson Beck	Miami (FL)	QB
January 8, 2026	Jakobe Thomas	Miami (FL)	DB

== Most appearances ==
Updated through the January 2026 edition (55 games, 110 total appearances).

Rank	Team	Appearances	Record	Win pct.
1	Ohio State	9	5–4	.556
2	Penn State	8	8–0	1.000
T3	Arizona State	6	5–1	.833
T3	Nebraska	6	2–4	.333
T3	Notre Dame	6	1–5	.167
T3	Oklahoma	5	2–3	.400
T3	Miami (FL)	5	1–4	.200
T8	Boise State	4	3–1	.750
T8	Oregon	4	3–1	.750
T8	Florida State	4	2–2	.500
T8	Pittsburgh	4	1–3	.250
T12	Oklahoma State	3	3–0	1.000
T12	Arizona	3	1–2	.333
T12	Colorado	3	1–2	.333
T12	Kansas State	3	1–2	.333
T12	Tennessee	3	1–2	.333

Rank	Team	Appearances	Record	Win pct.
T17	Clemson	2	2–0	1.000
T17	UCLA	2	1–0–1	.750
T17	Michigan	2	1–1	.500
T17	Syracuse	2	1–1	.500
T17	Texas	2	1–1	.500
T17	UCF	2	1–1	.500
T17	West Virginia	2	1–1	.500
T17	TCU	2	1–1	.500

Teams with a single appearance

Won (5): Iowa State, LSU, Louisville, Oregon State, Utah
Lost (12): Alabama, Baylor, BYU, Connecticut, Florida, Liberty, Missouri, Ole Miss, Stanford, USC, Washington, Wyoming
Tied (1): Arkansas

Cal and Washington State are the only active or former Pac-12 members that have not appeared in the game. Kansas, Texas A&M, and Texas Tech are the only Big 12 or Big Eight members (active or former) that have not appeared in the game.

== Appearances by conference ==
Updated through the January 2026 edition (55 games, 110 total appearances).

Conference	Record					Appearances by year		
Conference	Games	W	L	T	Win pct.	Won	Lost	Tied
Independents	21	10	11	0	.476	1977^{D}, 1979^{D}, 1980^{D}, 1982, 1987, 1988, 1989, 1990, 1991, 1992	1971^{D}, 1973^{D}, 1984, 1985, 1987, 1989, 1995, 2001, 2006, 2016, 2022	
Big 12	15	8	7	0	.533	1997^{D}, 2000, 2009, 2011, 2012, 2021, 2022, 2022^{D}	1997, 2002, 2004, 2007, 2008, 2013, 2014	
Big Ten	14	9	5	0	.643	1984, 1986, 1997, 2003, 2004, 2006, 2016, 2017^{D}, 2024^{D}	1980^{D}, 2009, 2016^{D}, 2019^{D}, 2022^{D}	
Pac-12	14	7	6	1	.536	1983, 1985, 1994, 2001, 2002, 2013, 2024	1979^{D}, 1982, 2012, 2014^{D}, 2017^{D}, 2021	1978^{D}
Big Eight	11	4	7	0	.364	1974^{D}, 1976^{D}, 1995, 1996	1972^{D}, 1975^{D}, 1983, 1986, 1988, 1990, 1993	
WAC	9	6	3	0	.667	1971^{D}, 1972^{D}, 1973^{D}, 1975^{D}, 2007, 2010	1974^{D}, 1976^{D}, 1977^{D}	
American	9	3	6	0	.333	1993, 2008, 2014	1994, 1997^{D}, 2003, 2005, 2011, 2019	
SEC	7	2	5	0	.286	1999, 2019	1991, 1992, 1996, 2000, 2026	
ACC	4	3	1	0	.750	2016^{D}, 2019^{D}, 2026	1999	
Mountain West	4	2	2	0	.500	2005, 2014^{D}	2010, 2024^{D}	
SWC	1	0	0	1	.500			1978^{D}
C-USA	1	0	1	0	.000		2024	

- Games were played in the calendar year listed; in December if marked with an superscript D (such as 1971^{D}), else in January.
- Conferences that are defunct or no longer active in FBS are marked in italics.
- Records reflect conference affiliations at the time the game was played.
  - Several teams—such as Penn State and Miami (FL)—have appeared both as an Independent and as a conference member.
- The Pac-12's record includes eight appearances (5–2–1) by teams when the conference was known as the Pac-10.
- The American Conference retains the charter of the original Big East, following its 2013 split along football lines. Teams representing the Big East appeared in seven games, compiling a 2–5 record.

== Game records ==
Team	Performance vs. Opponent	Year
Most points scored (both teams)	96, TCU (51) vs. Michigan (45)	Dec. 2022
Most points scored (one team)	62, Nebraska vs. Florida	1996
Most points scored (losing team)	45, Michigan vs. TCU	Dec. 2022
Fewest points allowed	0, Clemson (31) vs. Ohio State; 0, Arizona (29) vs. Miami	2016; 1994
Largest margin of victory	39, Oregon (45) vs. Liberty (6)	2024
First downs	34, Oklahoma State vs. Notre Dame	Jan. 2022
Rushing yards	524, Nebraska vs. Florida	1996
Passing yards	509, Notre Dame vs. Oklahoma State	Jan. 2022
Total yards	718, Arizona State vs. Missouri	1972
Fewest Rushing yards allowed	–28, Nebraska vs. Florida	1996
Fewest Passing yards allowed	23, Wyoming vs. Oklahoma	1976
Fewest Total yards allowed	155, Oregon State vs. Notre Dame	2001
Individual	Performance, Player, Team vs. Opponent	Year
Total offense	505, Jack Coan, Notre Dame vs. Oklahoma State (509 pass, –4 rush)	Jan. 2022
Rushing yards	245, Marcus Dupree, Oklahoma vs. Arizona State (17 att., 0 TD)	1983
Rushing TDs	4, Ezekiel Elliott, Ohio State vs. Notre Dame; 4, Woody Green, Arizona State vs. Missouri	2016; 1972
Passing yards	509, Jack Coan, Notre Dame vs. Oklahoma State	Jan. 2022
Passing TDs	5, Bo Nix, Oregon vs. Liberty; 5, Jack Coan, Notre Dame vs. Oklahoma State; 5, Peter Tom Willis, Florida State vs. Nebraska	2024; Jan. 2022; 1990
Receiving yards	206, Darnell McDonald, Kansas State vs. Syracuse	1998
Receiving TDs	3, shared by: Darnell McDonald, Kansas State vs. Syracuse; Justin Blackmon, Oklahoma State vs. Stanford; Tay Martin, Oklahoma State vs. Notre Dame	1998; 2012; 2022
Tackles	18, Ted Johnson, Colorado vs. Notre Dame	1995
Sacks	3, shared by three players	
Interceptions	3, Steve Smith, Oregon vs. Colorado	2002
Long plays	Performance, Player, Team vs. Opponent	Year
Touchdown run	92, Saquon Barkley, Penn State vs. Washington	2017
Touchdown pass	85, Troy Smith to Santonio Holmes, Ohio State vs. Notre Dame	2006
Kickoff return	100, shared by: Kirby Dar Dar, Syracuse vs. Colorado; Mike Fink, Missouri vs. Arizona State; D'Anthony Thomas, Oregon vs. Kansas State	1993; 1972; 2013
Punt return	68, shared by: Eddie Brown, Miami vs. UCLA; Steve Holden, Arizona State vs. Florida State	1985; 1971
Interception return	54, Dwayne Goodrich, Tennessee vs. Florida State	1999
Fumble return	31, Tony Bouie, Arizona vs. Miami (FL)	1994
Punt	66, Pat McAfee, West Virginia vs. Oklahoma	2008
Field goal	59, Jake Moody, Michigan vs. TCU	Dec. 2022

== Broadcasting ==
As of the 2010–11 season, the game along with the rest of the BCS and its successor, the College Football Playoff, exclusively airs on ESPN. From 2007 through 2010, Fox telecast the game along with the other BCS games – the Sugar Bowl, Orange Bowl, and BCS National Championship Game from 2006 though 2009, while only the Rose Bowl and the 2010 BCS National Championship Game aired on ABC in that period. From 1999 to 2006, the game aired on ABC as part of the first BCS package, and from 1996 to 1998 (and prior to that, from 1974 to 1977) the game aired on CBS as part of its bowl coverage. Prior to that, NBC aired the game from 1978 to 1995. This game, along with the Orange Bowl, is one of only two bowl games ever to air on all the "Big 4" broadcast television networks in the United States.

ESPN Radio is the radio home for the Fiesta Bowl.

In 2013, ESPN Deportes provided the first Spanish U.S. telecast of the Fiesta Bowl.
