= Devon Dampier =

American football player (born 2004)

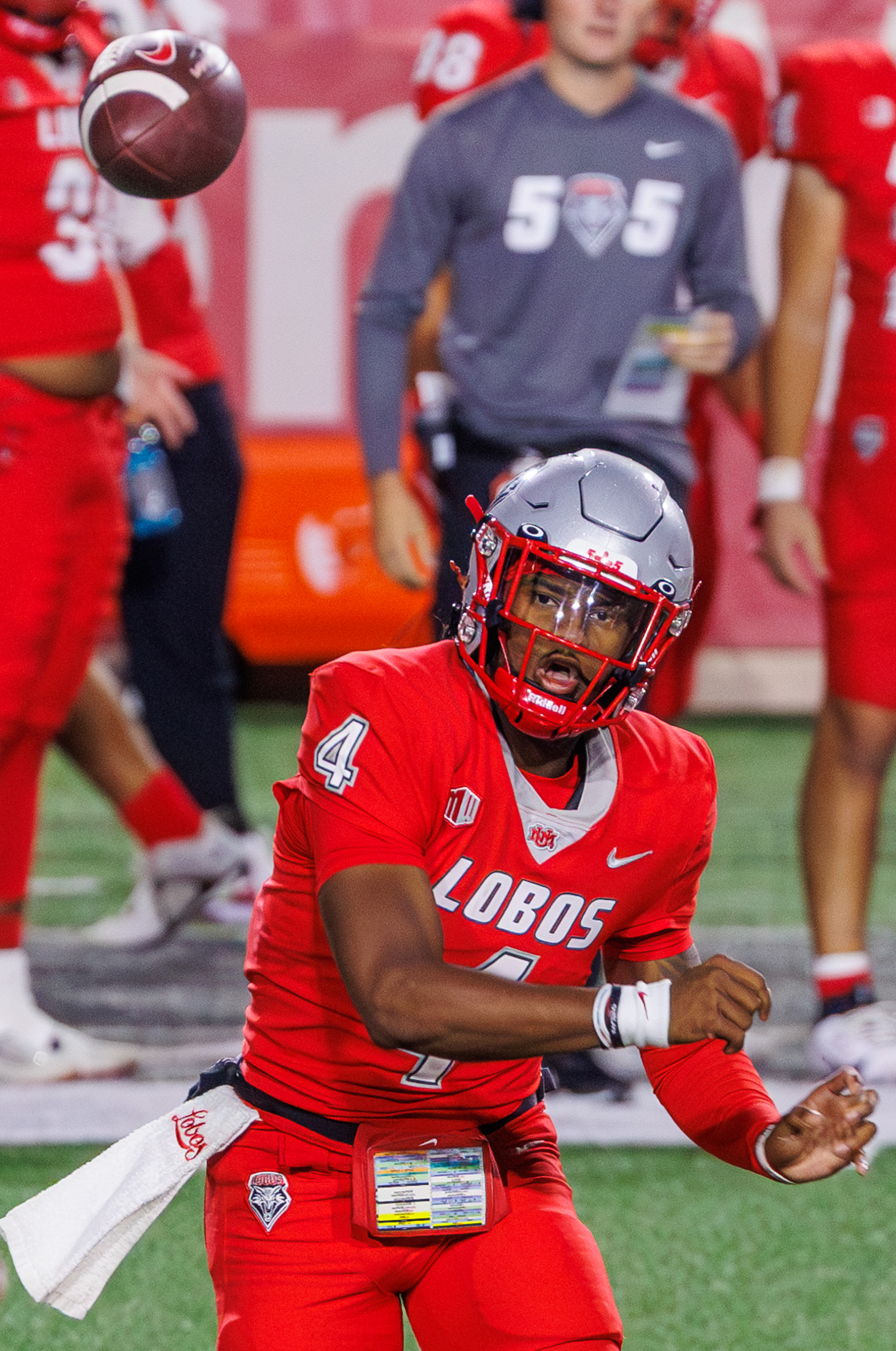
- Dampier in 2024

No. 4 – Utah Utes
- Position: Quarterback
- Class: Senior

Personal information
- Born: October 4, 2004 (age 22)
- Listed height: 5 ft 11 in (1.80 m)
- Listed weight: 210 lb (95 kg)

Career information
- High school: Saguaro (Scottsdale, Arizona)
- College: New Mexico (2023–2024); Utah (2025–present)

Awards and highlights
- Big 12 Offensive Newcomer of the Year (2025); First-team All-MW (2024); Third-team All-Big 12 (2025); Ed Doherty Award (2022)
- Stats at ESPN

Devon Dampier (born October 4, 2004) is an American college football quarterback for the Utah Utes. He previously played for the New Mexico Lobos.

== Early life ==
Dampier attended Saguaro High School in Scottsdale, Arizona. He was rated as a three-star recruit and committed to play college football for the New Mexico Lobos over other schools such as Air Force, Arizona, and Northern Arizona.

== College career ==
=== New Mexico ===
Dampier began his true freshman season as the backup quarterback to UAB transfer Dylan Hopkins. He made his collegiate debut in Week 2 against Tennessee Tech, recording his first career touchdown on a six-yard rushing score in the victory. In Week 5 against Wyoming, he relieved an injured Hopkins and threw two second-half touchdown passes in a narrow loss. He then appeared in the next five games in a dual-threat role, seeing action in designed offensive packages. In Week 10, Dampier made his first collegiate start against Boise State, completing 17 of 26 passes for 200 yards while adding 32 rushing yards in the loss as Hopkins remained sidelined with injury. He returned to a backup role for the final two games of the season. Overall, Dampier appeared in nine games with one start, completing 40 of 64 passes for 525 yards and six touchdowns while rushing 59 times for 328 yards and four touchdowns.

Heading into the 2024 season, Dampier was named the Lobos' starting quarterback for their season opener against Montana State. New Mexico opened the season with four consecutive losses, though Dampier accounted for five total touchdowns against No. 21 Arizona and threw for a season-high 338 yards against Fresno State during that stretch. In Week 11, Dampier led the Lobos to an upset victory over No. 18 Washington State, rushing for 193 yards and three touchdowns, including the game-winning rushing touchdown with 21 seconds remaining in a 38–35 victory. The win marked New Mexico's first victory over a ranked opponent since 2003 and ended Washington State's remaining College Football Playoff hopes. The Lobos finished the season with a 5–7 record, with Dampier appearing in and starting all 12 games. He was the only player on the team to record a passing attempt and led the Mountain West with 545 total offensive plays. During the season, Dampier recorded six 100-yard rushing games and seven games with multiple rushing touchdowns, including four games with three rushing touchdowns. He rushed for a season-high 207 yards against Wyoming in a loss. On the year, he completed 226 of 390 passes for 2,768 yards, 12 touchdowns, and 12 interceptions while rushing 155 times for 1,166 yards, averaging 7.5 yards per carry, and scoring 19 touchdowns. His 7.5 yards per carry ranked first in the Mountain West and second nationally among qualified players. His 19 rushing touchdowns tied former Lobos running back DonTrell Moore's single-season school record set in 2003, while his 3,934 total yards established a new New Mexico single-season record. For his performance, Dampier was named first-team All-Mountain West, becoming the first quarterback in New Mexico program history to earn first-team All-Mountain West honors. He was also the first Lobos quarterback to earn any first-team all-conference recognition since Graham Leigh was named first-team All-WAC in 1998. On December 5, 2024, Dampier announced that he would enter the NCAA transfer portal.

=== Utah ===
On December 11, 2024, Dampier announced that he would transfer to Utah. Headed into the 2025 season, Dampier was named Utah's starting quarterback over returning quarterback Isaac Wilson and freshman Byrd Ficklin. He made his first start for the Utes in the season opener against UCLA, completing 21 of 25 passes for 206 yards and two touchdowns while adding 87 rushing yards and a rushing touchdown in a 43–10 victory. During the regular season, Dampier led Utah to a 10–2 record and a peak ranking of No. 12 in the rankings, despite missing one game due to an ankle injury. In the Las Vegas Bowl against Nebraska, he accounted for 458 total yards of offense, tying the eighth-highest single-game total in school history, and recorded five total touchdowns. He set season highs with 310 passing yards and 148 rushing yards in the 44–22 victory and was named the game's most valuable player. On the season, Dampier completed 212 of 334 passes for 2,490 yards, 24 touchdowns, and five interceptions while rushing for 835 yards and 10 touchdowns. He earned third-team All-Big 12 honors and was named the Big 12 Offensive Newcomer of the Year. His 34 total touchdowns during the 2025 season has him ranked second in Utah single-season history trailing only Alex Smith's 42 in 2004.

=== Statistics ===
Year	Team	Games			Passing								Rushing			
Year	Team	GP	GS	Record	Cmp	Att	Pct	Yds	Y/A	TD	Int	Rtg	Att	Yds	Avg	TD
2023	New Mexico	9	1	0–1	40	64	62.5	525	8.2	6	0	162.3	59	328	5.6	4
2024	New Mexico	12	12	5–7	226	390	57.9	2,768	7.1	12	12	121.6	155	1,166	7.5	19
2025	Utah	12	12	10–2	212	334	63.5	2,490	7.5	24	5	146.8	146	835	5.7	10
2026	Utah	11	11	11–0	203	306	66.3	2,535	8.3	24	8	156.6	138	644	4.7	11
Career		44	36	26–10	681	1,094	62.2	8,318	7.6	66	25	141.5	498	2,973	6.0	44
