= 2004 Utah Utes football team =

American college football season

2004 Utah Utes football

Mountain West champion Fiesta Bowl champion

Fiesta Bowl, W 35–7 vs. Pittsburgh
- Conference: Mountain West Conference

Ranking
- Coaches: No. 5
- AP: No. 4
- Record: 12–0 (7–0 MW)
- Head coach: Urban Meyer (2nd season)
- Offensive coordinator: Mike Sanford (2nd season)
- Offensive scheme: Spread option
- Defensive coordinator: Kyle Whittingham (10th season)
- Base defense: 4–3
- Home stadium: Rice-Eccles Stadium

2004 Mountain West Conference football standings
	Conf.			Overall
Team	W		L	W		L
No. 4 Utah $	7	–	0	12	–	0
New Mexico	5	–	2	7	–	5
BYU	4	–	3	5	–	6
Wyoming	3	–	4	7	–	5
Air Force	3	–	4	5	–	6
Colorado State	3	–	4	4	–	7
San Diego State	2	–	5	4	–	7
UNLV	1	–	6	2	–	9
$ – Conference champion and BCS representative as top non-AQ school to meet automatic qualification criteria; Rankings from AP Poll

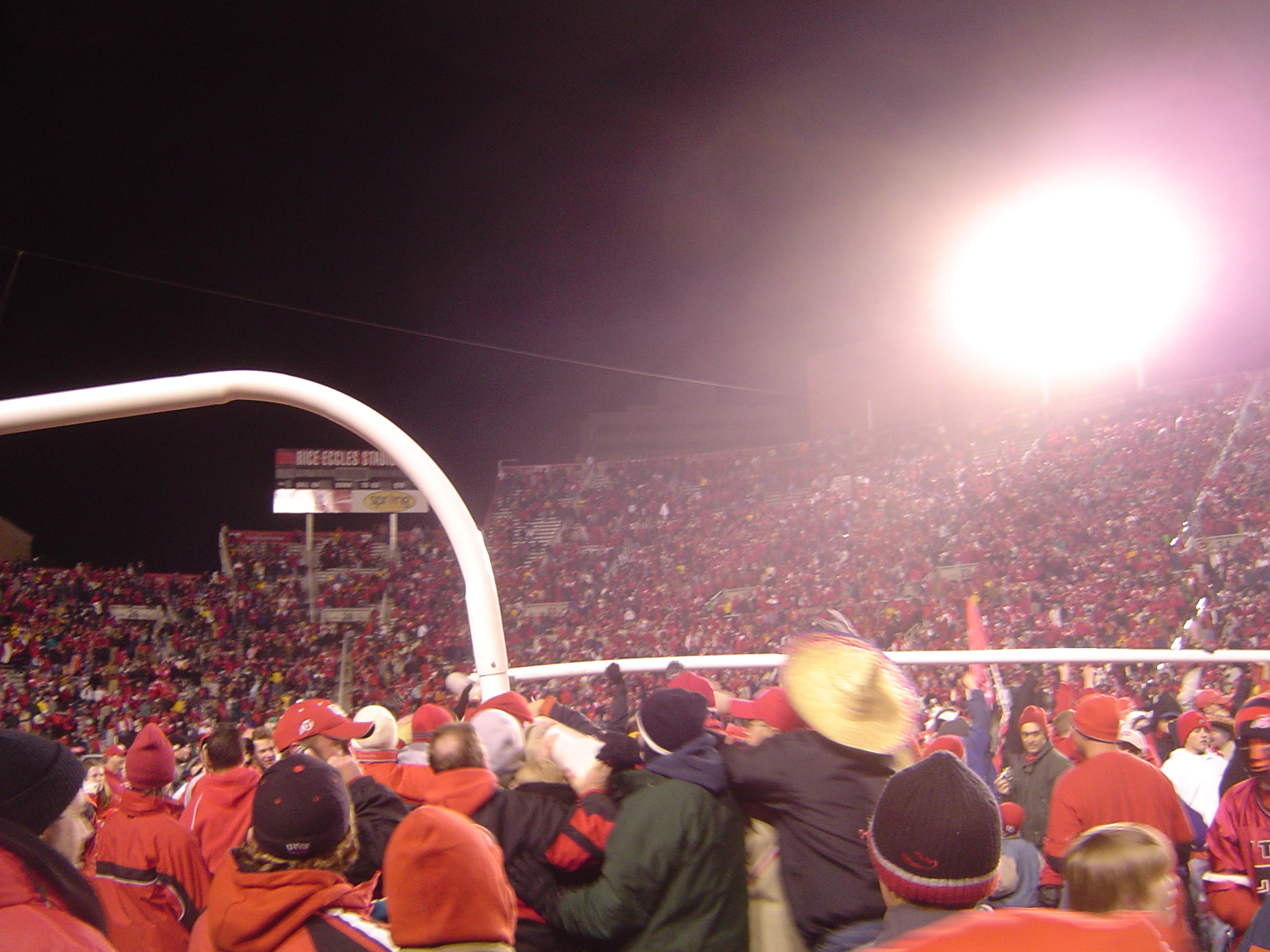
Utah Utes fans rush the field and carry the goalpost after defeating rival BYU, completing a perfect regular season, and becoming the first BCS Buster by clinching a spot in the 2005 Fiesta Bowl (hence the sombrero).

The 2004 Utah Utes football team represented the University of Utah in the 2004 NCAA Division I-A football season. This team was the original 'BCS Buster', meaning, this was the first time that a team from a BCS non-AQ conference was invited to play in one of the BCS bowl games. The team, coached by second-year head football coach Urban Meyer, played its home games in Rice-Eccles Stadium.

Utah finished the season 12–0, the fourth undefeated and untied season in school history. The Utes were one of three teams in the top-level Division I FBS to finish the season undefeated (the others being the USC Trojans and the Auburn Tigers.)

Utah was the highest-ranked BCS non-AQ team in each poll every week of the season.

== Schedule ==
Date	Time	Opponent	Rank	Site	TV	Result	Attendance
September 2	5:30 pm	Texas A&M*	No. 20	Rice-Eccles Stadium; Salt Lake City	ESPN	W 41–21	45,419
September 11	8:00 pm	at Arizona*	No. 17	Arizona Stadium; Tucson, Arizona	KJZZ	W 23–6	52,790
September 18	5:00 pm	at Utah State*	No. 15	Romney Stadium; Logan, Utah (Battle of the Brothers)	KJZZ	W 48–6	24,750
September 25	1:00 pm	Air Force^{†}	No. 14	Rice-Eccles Stadium; Salt Lake City	ESPN+	W 49–35	44,043
October 1	6:00 pm	at New Mexico	No. 14	University Stadium; Albuquerque, New Mexico	ESPN2	W 28–7	40,182
October 16	8:00 pm	North Carolina*	No. 11	Rice-Eccles Stadium; Salt Lake City	KJZZ	W 46–16	45,319
October 23	5:00 pm	UNLV	No. 9	Rice-Eccles Stadium; Salt Lake City	KJZZ	W 63–28	40,341
October 30	7:00 pm	at San Diego State	No. 9	Qualcomm Stadium; San Diego	KJZZ	W 51–28	32,683
November 6	7:45 pm	Colorado State	No. 7	Rice-Eccles Stadium; Salt Lake City	ESPN2	W 63–31	44,222
November 13	5:00 pm	at Wyoming	No. 7	War Memorial Stadium; Laramie, Wyoming	ABC	W 45–28	17,074
November 20	5:00 pm	BYU	No. 5	Rice-Eccles Stadium; Salt Lake City (Holy War) (College GameDay)	ESPN2	W 52–21	45,326
January 1	6:30 pm	vs. No. 19 Pittsburgh*	No. 5	Sun Devil Stadium; Tempe, Arizona (Fiesta Bowl)	ABC	W 35–7	73,519
*Non-conference game; ^{†}Homecoming; Rankings from AP Poll released prior to the game; All times are in Mountain time

== Rankings ==
Ranking movements Legend: ██ Increase in ranking ██ Decrease in ranking
	Week																
Poll	Pre	1	2	3	4	5	6	7	8	9	10	11	12	13	14	15	Final
AP	20	20	17	15	14	14	11	11	9	9	7	7	5	5	5	5	4
Coaches	21	19	16	14	14	14	11	10	10	10	8	8	6	6	6	6	5
BCS	Not released								7	6	6	7	6	6	6	6	Not released

== Game summaries ==
=== Texas A&M ===
	1	2	3	4	Total
Aggies	0	7	0	14	21
#20 Utes	7	20	7	7	41

=== Arizona ===
	1	2	3	4	Total
#17 Utes	17	0	6	0	23
Wildcats	3	3	0	0	6

=== Utah State ===
	1	2	3	4	Total
#15 Utes	20	21	7	0	48
Aggies	0	0	6	0	6

=== Air Force ===
	1	2	3	4	Total
Falcons	7	7	14	7	35
#14 Utes	0	21	14	14	49

=== New Mexico ===
	1	2	3	4	Total
#14 Utes	7	0	14	7	28
Lobos	7	0	0	0	7

=== North Carolina ===
	1	2	3	4	Total
Tar Heels	7	3	6	0	16
#11 Utes	10	20	7	9	46

=== UNLV ===
	1	2	3	4	Total
Rebels	7	7	7	7	28
#9 Utes	28	14	21	0	63

=== San Diego State ===
	1	2	3	4	Total
#9 Utes	10	24	7	10	51
Aztecs	0	21	0	7	28

=== Colorado State ===
	1	2	3	4	Total
Rams	3	7	0	21	31
#7 Utes	21	21	14	7	63

=== Wyoming ===
	1	2	3	4	Total
#7 Utes	17	14	14	0	45
Cowboys	7	0	7	14	28

=== BYU ===
BYU at #5 Utah

Team	1	2	3	4	Total
BYU	0	14	7	0	21
• Utah	7	14	17	14	52

- Date: November 20
- Location: Rice-Eccles Stadium, Salt Lake City, Utah
- Game start: 7:00 p.m.

Scoring summary
1	0:52	UTAH	Steve Savoy 2-yard run (David Carroll kick)	UTAH 7-0
2	12:13	BYU	Todd Watkins 5-yard pass from John Beck (Matt Payne kick)	Tied 7-7
2	9:28	UTAH	Marty Johnson 5-yard run (David Carroll kick)	UTAH 14-7
2	5:40	BYU	Curtis Brown 6-yard run (Matt Payne kick)	Tied 14-14
2	1:19	UTAH	Alex Smith 2-yard run (David Carroll kick)	UTAH 21-14
3	11:43	UTAH	David Carroll 30-yard field goal	UTAH 24-14
3	10:43	UTAH	Bo Nagahi 12-yard fumble return (David Carroll kick)	UTAH 31-14
3	8:38	BYU	Austin Collie 16-yard pass from John Beck (Matt Payne kick)	UTAH 31-21
3	5:59	UTAH	Steve Savoy 92-yard run (David Carroll kick)	UTAH 38-21
4	10:34	UTAH	Steve Savoy 20-yard pass from Alex Smith (David Carroll kick)	UTAH 45-21
4	1:03	UTAH	Steve Fifta 4-yard run (David Carroll kick)	UTAH 52-21

=== Fiesta Bowl: Utah vs. Pittsburgh ===
	1	2	3	4	Total
#19 Panthers	0	0	7	0	7
#5 Utes	7	7	21	0	35

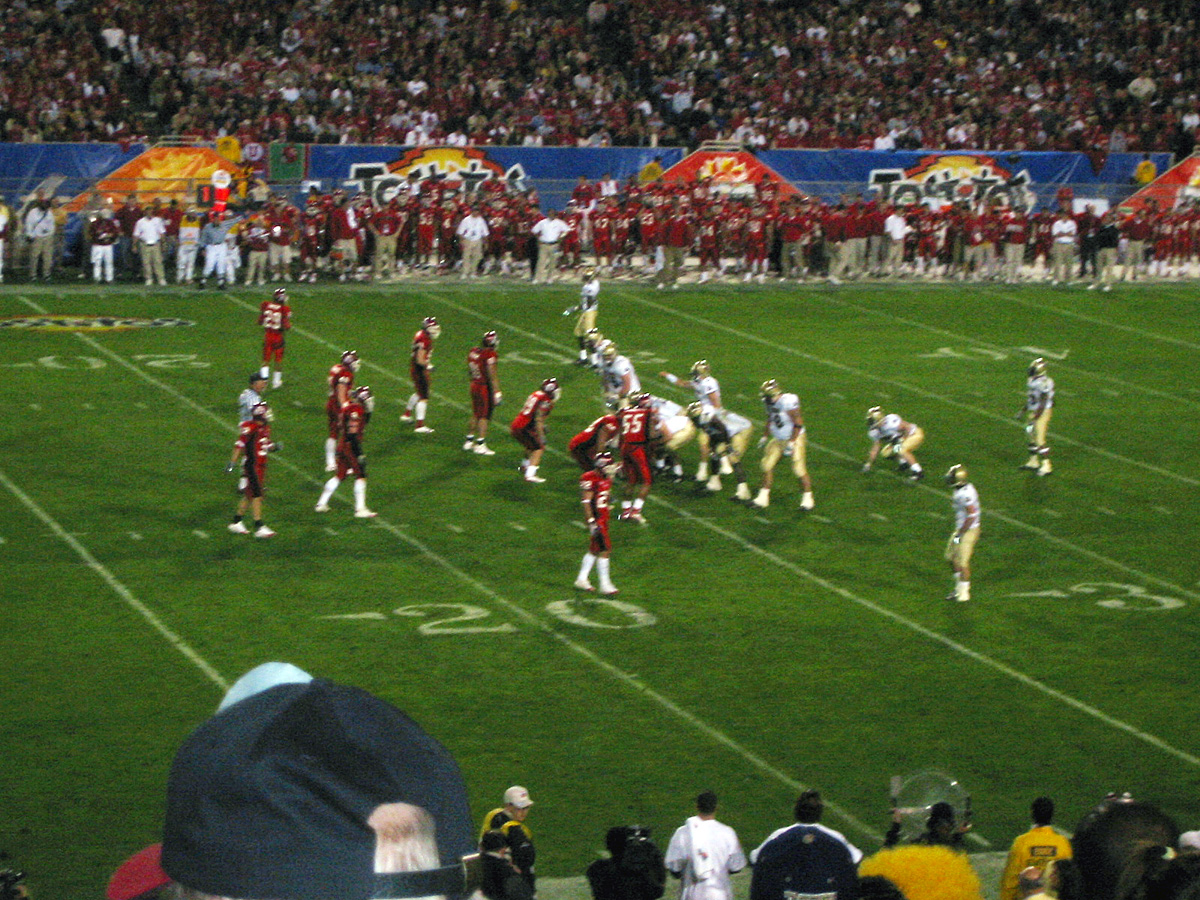
2005 Fiesta Bowl

== Depth chart ==
Defensive starters

FS
Morgan Scalley
Antonio Young

CB
Ryan Smith
Eugene Oates

OLB	MLB	OLB
Spencer Toone	Tommy Hackenbruck	Corey Dodds
Kyle Brady	Taylor Miller	Malakai Mokofisi
Grady Marshall		

DE	NT	T	LE
Marques Ledbetter	Sione Pouha	Steve Fifita	Jonathan Fanene
Martail Burnett	Tevita Kemoeatu	Tevita Kemoeatu	Reza Williams
	Kite Afeaki		Kite Afeaki

SS
Eric Weddle
Casey Evans

CB
Bo Nagahi
Eugene Oates

Offensive starters

WR
Steve Savoy
Derrek Richards

LT	LG	C	RG	RT
Tavo Tupola	David Dirkmaat	Jesse Boone	Chris Kemoeatu	Makai Aalona
Jason Voss	Eric Pettit	Andrew Johnson	Kyle Gunther	David Dirkmaat
	Steve Dahl			Jason Boone

TE
Blake Burdette
Willie Sao

WR
Travis LaTendresse
Thomas Huff

WR
Paris Warren
Jerome Wright

WR
John Madsen
Jerome Wright

QB
Alex Smith
Brian Johnson
Fano Tagovailoa

RB
Marty Johnson
Quinton Ganther

== Season Statistics ==
2004 Official Stats

=== Team ===
	Utah	Opp
Scoring	544	234
Points per game	45.3	19.5
First downs	305	220
Rushing	145	90
Passing	136	103
Penalty	24	27
Rushing yards	2833	1682
Avg per play	5.4	3.8
Avg per game	236.1	140.2
Rushing touchdowns	36	19
Passing yards	3164	2439
Att-Comp-Int	344-232-5	372-196-16
Avg per pass	9.2	6.6
Avg per catch	13.6	12.4
Avg per game	263.7	203.2
Passing touchdowns	33	11
Total offense	5997	4121
Avg per play	6.9	5.1
Avg per game	499.8	343.2
Fumbles lost	22–9	19–13
Penalties – yards	88-765	80-693
Avg per game	63.8	57.8

	Team	Opp
Punts – yards	45-1878	70-2727
Avg per Punt	41.7	39.0
Time of possession/game	31:14	28:46
3rd down conversions	80-153	62-177
4th down conversions	9–17	15–25
Touchdowns scored	75	32
Field goals – attempts	7–7	4–11
PAT – attempts	71–75	30–30
Attendance	264670	167479
Games/Avg per game	6-44112	5-33496
Neutral Site	1-73519	

=== Individual Leaders ===
Passing
Player	COMP	ATT	Pct.	YDS	TD	INT	QB rating
Alex Smith	214	317	.675	2952	32	4	176.52
Brian Johnson	14	21	.667	142	1	1	129.66
Fan Tagovailoa	2	2	1.000	24	-	-	305.80
Paris Warren	1	2	.500	21	-	-	138.20

Rushing
Player	ATT	YDS	YPC	TD
Marty Johnson	165	802	4.9	14
Quinton Ganther	109	654	6.0	2
Alex Smith	135	631	4.7	10
Steve Savoy	22	307	14.0	6
Paris Warren	28	157	5.6	2
Brian Johnson	21	92	4.4	1

Receiving
Player	REC	YDS	YPR	TD
Paris Warren	80	1076	13.4	12
Steve Savoy	67	961	14.3	11
Travis Latendresse	27	411	15.2	2
John Madsen	27	377	14.0	5
Quinton Ganther	7	49	7.0	1
Marty Johnson	7	46	6.6	1
Jerome Wright	5	64	12.8	1

Tackles
Player	Solo	Asst	Total	TFL	Sacks
Spencer Toone	40	75	115	4	1
Tommy Hackenbruck	46	45	91	9.5	4.5
Eric Weddle	47	28	75	4.5	1
Morgan Scalley	27	24	51	2.5	2.5
Marquess Ledbetter	15	31	46	9	4.5
Steve Fifita	23	22	45	9	4.5
Ryan Smith	26	18	44	3	2
Bo Nagahi	31	11	42	2.5	0
Corey Dodds	10	27	37	4	2
Sione Pouha	16	20	36	3	2
Jonathan Fanene	12	10	22	5.5	3

Pass defense
Player	INT	YDS	Broken up
Morgan Scalley	6	79	2
Eric Weddle	4	34	5
Jonathan Fanene	1	76	1
Corey Dodds	1	26	1
Ryan Smith	1	0	7
Sione Pouha	1	0	4
Steve Fifita	1	6	2

== After the season ==
=== NFL draft ===
Utah had five players taken in the 2005 NFL draft:

Player	Position	Round	Pick	NFL club
Alex Smith	Quarterback	1	1	San Francisco 49ers
Sione Pouha	Defensive tackle	3	88	New York Jets
Chris Kemoeatu	Offensive guard	6	204	Pittsburgh Steelers
Paris Warren	Wide receiver	7	225	Tampa Bay Buccaneers
Jonathan Fanene	Defensive end	7	233	Cincinnati Bengals

=== Awards ===
==== National ====
- Urban Meyer: The Home Depot Coach of the Year Award, Eddie Robinson Coach of the Year, Woody Hayes' National Coach of the Year, Maxwell George Munger Award
- Alex Smith: Heisman Trophy finalist (fourth place), The Sporting News National Player of the Year, Sports Illustrated National Player of the Year, Cingular Sports/ABC Sports All-American, SI.com All-American (first team), CoSIDA Football Academic All-American of the Year, Davey O'Brien Award finalist, Walter Camp Award finalist
- Chris Kemoeatu: Cingular Sports/ABC Sports All-American, SI.com All-American (first team)
- Morgan Scalley: SI.com All-American (second team), CoSIDA Academic All-American (first team), Anson Mount Scholar-Athlete of the Year, Bronko Nagurski National Player of the Week, Pat Tillman Award (East–West Shrine Game honor)
- Steve Savoy: SI.com All-American (second team), The Sporting News All-American (honorable mention)
- Ryan Smith: The Sporting News Freshman All-American (second team)
- Spencer Toone: CoSIDA Academic All-District VIII first team

==== Conference ====
- Coach of the Year: Urban Meyer
- Offensive Player of the Year: Alex Smith
- Co-defensive Player of the Year: Morgan Scalley
- All-MWC First team: Alex Smith, Steve Savoy, Chris Kemoeatu, Steve Fifita, Sione Pouha, Morgan Scalley
- All-MWC Second team: Paris Warren, Marty Johnson, Jesse Boone, Eric Weddle
- All-MWC Honorable mention: Makai Aalona, Quinton Ganther, Tommy Hackenbruck, Matt Kovacevich, Spencer Toone

== See also ==
- List of undefeated Division I football teams
