= BattleFrog College Championship =

- Genre: Sports
- Written by: Tom Davis, Danny Llewelyn, Ron Luscinski
- Directed by: Ron Luscinski
- Country of origin: United States
- Original language: English
- No. of seasons: 1
- No. of episodes: 3

Production
- Executive producers: Ron Luscinski, Danny Llewelyn, Tom Davis, Michael McAllister, Carlos Centurion and Leo Fernandez
- Production location: Orlando, Florida
- Cinematography: Matthias Schubert
- Editor: Nikki Fabery de Jonge
- Running time: 180 minutes
- Production company: '51 Dons

Original release
- Network: ESPN2, ESPNU

BattleFrog College Championship was a sports competition television series directed by Ron Luscinski and written by Luscinski, Tom Davis, and Danny Llewelyn.

Hosted by Ron Pitts, sportscaster and former NFL cornerback, and Evan Dollard, from American Ninja Warrior and American Gladiators, BattleFrog College Championship showcases 16 co-ed rival college teams competing for a national championship and academic scholarships on the ultimate sprint track obstacle course built by Navy Seals; this single-elimination competition was a 350-meter, four-person relay with over 20 obstacles testing the competitors' strength, speed, and endurance.

The competing colleges for season one included: Syracuse, Texas A&M, Penn State, the N.C. State Triathlon Club, Army, Alabama, Florida, Illinois, Kentucky, Miami (FL), Michigan, Ole Miss, USC, Virginia, Wisconsin and Virginia Tech.

The three-episode series premiered on June 9, 2015, in the United States on ESPN2. Following its U.S. release, the series aired in Australia, New Zealand, Japan and Latin America.

As of August 2016, BattleFrog announced that they were closing their business.

== Production ==
Casting for 64 athletes from 16 U.S. colleges began in September 2014. Competitors were selected based on their GPA and athletic performance. Filming commenced in Spring 2015 in Orlando, Florida, at Rock on Adventures Ranch alongside the BattleFrog obstacle race series Central Florida festival. Acclaimed sportscaster Ron Pitts and two-time American Ninja Warrior finalist Evan Dollard hosted the three-day single-elimination competition with sideline reporters, Emily Reppert from Fox Sports Southwest and Shawn Ramirez, two-time crossfit winner.

The series was produced by '51 Dons Film, LLC, and BattleFrog Obstacle Race series, and distributed by ESPN networks.

== Season One Obstacles (2015) ==
Obstacle #	Obstacle Name
1	16' Ladder
2	3' Hump Overs
3	18' Cargo Crawl
4	Rolling Log
5	6' Over/Under/Thru
6	6' Inverted Wall
7	Balance/Carry
8	Angled Wall
9	Dirty Name
10	12' Rope Climb
11	McMurdo Station
12	4 Step Beams
13	Delta Ladder
14	Lily Pads
15	12' Rope Wall
16	Log Crawl
17	Wedge Donovan
18	Monkey Bars
19	Tsunami
20	Normandy Jacks

== Season One (2015) ==
Season One Competitors
School	Male Competitor 1	Male Competitor 2	Female Competitor 1	Female Competitor 2	Team Manager
Army	Daniel Camacho	David Ochs Jr.	Kayla Carpenter	Nicole Heavirland	Tyree Meadows
Alabama	John White	Taylor Wood	Shelby Akin	Monica Vermillion	Travis Taylor
Florida	Erik Petrick	Jacob Tyer	Katie Alt	Reilly Sullivan	Alfie Sharp
Illinois	David Alberts	Seth Lankford	Leya Allind	Halie Kastl	
Kentucky	Cameron Cristofoli	Noah Gawthrop	Morgan Collins	Madison Smith	Jordan Burgess
Miami (FL)	Steven De Nicola	Adam O'Reilly	Alison Scudds	Leah Vertullo	
Michigan	John Pavletic	Eli Zucker	Camden Burk	Cassandra Gardner	Ellen Dixon
Ole Miss	Joshua Brenc	Jack Coffin	Kim Duff	Emily Lewis	
N.C. State	Zachary Leonard	Robert Maughan	Julianna Falzon	Danielle Smith	Charlie Lambrecht
Penn State	Charles Ackerman	Ryan Kalkbrenner	Katharine Ferster	Haley Schlechter	Katherine Sparks
USC	Corey Norris	Brian Zukotynski	Marilyn Crowley	Leora Mitzner	Kayla Howard-Anderson
Syracuse	Frank Fuentes Jr.	Elias Hubbard	Danielle Gehman	Katherine Roskoff	Jordan Peters
Texas A&M	Calvin Fusilier	David Tolstyka	Rebecca Hetu	Sarah Pledger	
Virginia	Greg Coffin	Michael Pender	Katya Davydova	Mira Korb	
Wisconsin	Sterling Chapin	Matthew Koester	Kimberly Kirt	Cassandra Visintainer	Aaron Hobson
Virginia Tech	Blake Armstrong	Shane Wescott	Corinna Coffin	Anna Taggart	Kevin Righi

=== Season One Championship (2015) ===
The Army team captured the coveted Trident Cup and earned academic scholarships.

Season One Championship
Seed	Team	Time
1	Army	02:13.9
2	Ole Miss	02:20.4

=== Season One Stats (2015) ===
Round of 16
Seed	Team	Time
1	Penn State	02:48.6
2	Miami (FL)	02:56.5
3	Ole Miss	02:58.2
4	Virginia	02:59.2
5	Virginia Tech	03:04.4
6	Army	03:06.6
7	Alabama	03:09.3
8	Wisconsin	03:38.2
9	Syracuse	03:42.5
10	Florida	04:11.8
11	N.C. State	05:11.2
12	Kentucky	05:28.1
13	Illinois	05:37.4
14	Texas A&M	05:47.1
15	USC	05:52.7
16	Michigan	10:10.0

Quarterfinals
Seed	Team	Time
1	Army	02:25.2
2	Ole Miss	02:30.3
3	Virginia Tech	02:43.8
5	Virginia	02:59.1
7	Alabama	02:59.9
6	Miami (FL)	03:09.6
4	Wisconsin	04:24.8
8	Penn State	07:04.7

Semifinals
Seed	Team	Time
1	Army	02:19.0
2	Ole Miss	02:36.5
3	Virginia Tech	02:44.1
5	Virginia	02:45.2

Finals
#	Team	Time
1st	Army	02:13.9
2nd	Ole Miss	02:20.4
3rd	Virginia Tech	02:42.4

Top 10 Fastest Times
#	Team	Time	Race
1	Army	02:13.9	Final
2	Army	02:19.0	Semifinals
3	Ole Miss	02:20.4	Final
4	Army	02:25.2	Quarterfinals
5	Ole Miss	02:30.3	Quarterfinals
6	Ole Miss	02:36.5	Semifinals
7	Army	02:40.6	Qualifying
8	Ole Miss	02:42.0	Qualifying
9	Virginia Tech	02:42.4	Third Place
10	Virginia Tech	02:43.8	Quarterfinals

== Reception ==
BattleFrog College Championship premiered episode one, First Round on ESPN2, Tuesday, June 9, 2015, in primetime to a critically receptive audience. Episodes two and three subsequently aired in primetime on June 10 and 11, 2015. Following its premiere, season one aired 9 times nationally in the U.S. on ESPN Networks and internationally in Australia, New Zealand, Japan and Latin America. BattleFrog College Championship season one drew over two million viewers in the first week and garnered a strong fan-base making season two a highly anticipated program for 2016.

On December 4, 2015, BattleFrog Obstacle Race Series was announced as the new title sponsor of college football's Fiesta Bowl, beginning with the January 2016 game.
