= Jonathan Fanene =

American football player (born 1982)

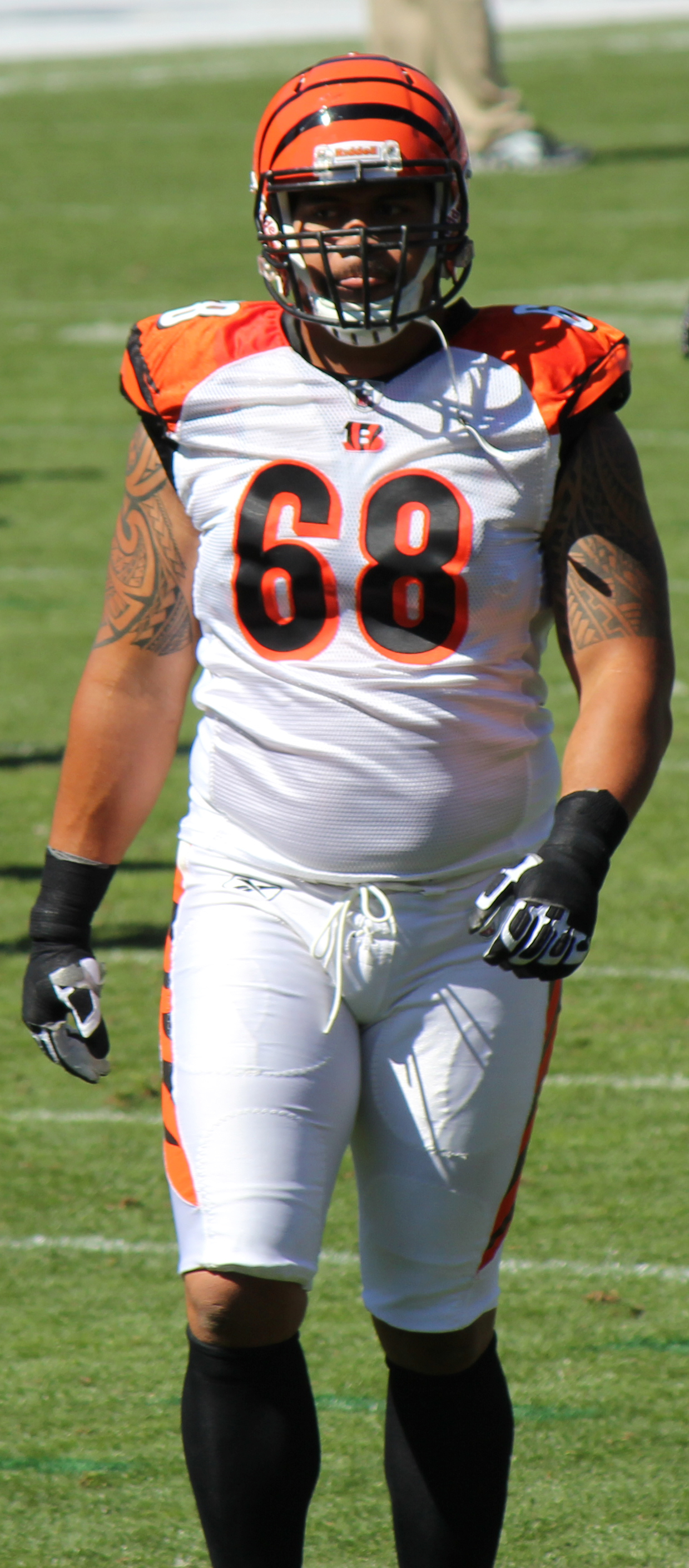
- Fanene with the Cincinnati Bengals in 2011

No. 68
- Position: Defensive end

Personal information
- Born: March 19, 1982 (age 44); Pago Pago, American Samoa
- Listed height: 6 ft 4 in (1.93 m)
- Listed weight: 285 lb (129 kg)

Career information
- High school: Tafuna (American Samoa)
- College: Utah
- NFL draft: 2005: 7th round, 233rd overall pick

Career history
- Cincinnati Bengals (2005–2011); New England Patriots (2012)*
- * Offseason or practice squad member only

Career NFL statistics
- Total tackles: 103
- Sacks: 13.5
- Fumble recoveries: 3
- Stats at Pro Football Reference

Jonathan David Fanene (born March 19, 1982) is a Samoan former professional American football defensive end in the National Football League (NFL). He was selected by the Cincinnati Bengals in the seventh round of the 2005 NFL draft. He played college football at College of the Canyons and Utah.

== College career ==
While attending the University of Utah, the Utes were able to win the 2005 Fiesta Bowl by defeating the University of Pittsburgh 35–7. At Utah, his jersey was number 91. He was a sociology major.

== Professional career ==
At the NFL Combine, Fanene had impressive scores. In the 40-yard dash, Fanene posted a 5.3 time. He also completed a 410-pound bench press.

=== Cincinnati Bengals ===
The Bengals selected Fanene with the 233rd overall pick in the seventh round of the 2005 NFL draft. Fanene was back living in American Samoa during the draft. Once Fanene arrived in Cincinnati, he received number 68. As a Bengal, Fanene was a teammate of Domata Peko, another Samoan-born player. Fanene was quoted in the Cincinnati Post about the new members:

"To be honest, it does make me more comfortable," said Fanene. "I'm used to being around different races but seeing the same nationality around you and having your friends from back home, it makes me happy to work with them."

(The quote was in reference to Domata Peko and Matt Toeaina, both Samoan-born players on the Bengals at the time; however, Matt Toeaina was cut during the 2007 season.)

Fanene was slowed by injuries including a hamstring injury in the off-season prior to the 2006 campaign. Fanene was able to play in four of the final five games of the 2006 season. On February 22, 2008, the Bengals and Fanene reached an agreement on a three-year extension.

=== New England Patriots ===
On March 14, 2012, Fanene signed with the New England Patriots for three years, $12 million with a $3.5 million signing bonus. He was released with a "failure to disclose physical condition" designation on August 21, 2012.

== Political career ==
Fanene had served as the Director of the American Samoa Department of Youth and Women's Affairs. His employment was terminated by American Samoa's acting Lt. Gov Lemanu Palepoi Sialega Mauga after Fanene was arrested for a May 26, 2019 incident where Fanene physically assaulted his wife and sister in front of his own son.

== Personal life ==
Fanene is a member of a family with 12 children, and is married to his wife Lorelei. Fanene resides in Dayton, Kentucky, a small town across the Ohio River from Cincinnati. They have a son, Truman. Fanene is of Samoan descent.
