= 1986 Utah Utes football team =

American college football season

1986 Utah Utes football
- Conference: Western Athletic Conference
- Record: 2–9 (1–7 WAC)
- Head coach: Jim Fassel (2nd season)
- Offensive coordinator: Jack Reilly (2nd season)
- Defensive coordinator: George Wheeler (3rd season)
- Home stadium: Robert Rice Stadium

1986 Western Athletic Conference football standings
	Conf.					Overall
Team	W		L		T	W		L		T
San Diego State $	7	–	1	–	0	8	–	4	–	0
BYU	6	–	2	–	0	8	–	5	–	0
Air Force	5	–	2	–	0	6	–	5	–	0
Hawaii	4	–	4	–	0	7	–	5	–	0
Colorado State	4	–	4	–	0	6	–	5	–	0
Wyoming	4	–	4	–	0	6	–	6	–	0
New Mexico	2	–	5	–	0	4	–	8	–	0
UTEP	2	–	6	–	0	4	–	8	–	0
Utah	1	–	7	–	0	2	–	9	–	0
$ – Conference champion

The 1986 Utah Utes football team represented the University of Utah in the Western Athletic Conference (WAC) during the 1986 NCAA Division I-A football season. In their second season under head coach Jim Fassel, the Utes compiled am overall record of 2–9 record with a mark of 1–7 against conference opponents, finished in last out of nine teams in the WAC, and were outscored by their opponents, 444 to 278. The team played home games at Robert Rice Stadium in Salt Lake City, Utah.

Utah's statistical leaders included Larry Egger with 2,761 passing yards, Eddie Johnson with 1,046 rushing yards, and Loren Richey with 775 receiving yards.

== Schedule ==
Date	Time	Opponent	Site	Result	Attendance	Source
September 13	7:00 pm	San Diego State	Robert Rice Stadium; Salt Lake City, UT	L 30–37	35,982	
September 27	11:30 am	at Ohio State*	Ohio Stadium; Columbus, OH	L 6–64	89,645	
October 3	7:00 pm	Air Force	Robert Rice Stadium; Salt Lake City, UT	L 35–45	33,281	
October 11	1:00 pm	at Wyoming	War Memorial Stadium; Laramie, WY	L 14–38	12,326	
October 18	7:00 pm	at New Mexico	University Stadium; Albuquerque, NM	L 43–47	15,979	
October 25	7:30 pm	at No. 9 Arizona State*	Sun Devil Stadium; Tempe, AZ	L 7–52	67,130	
November 1	12:00 pm	Hawaii	Robert Rice Stadium; Salt Lake City, UT	L 13–33	26,274	
November 8	12:00 pm	Colorado State^{†}	Robert Rice Stadium; Salt Lake City, UT	W 38–28	22,650	
November 15	1:00 pm	at Utah State*	Romney Stadium; Logan, UT (Battle of the Brothers)	W 27–10	13,034	
November 22	12:00 pm	BYU	Robert Rice Stadium; Salt Lake City, UT (Holy War)	L 21–35	34,128	
November 29	7:00 pm	at UTEP	Sun Bowl; El Paso, TX	L 44–55	14,567	
*Non-conference game; ^{†}Homecoming; Rankings from AP Poll released prior to the game; All times are in Mountain time
