= Steve Fifita =

American football player (born 1982)

No. 60
- Position: Defensive tackle

Personal information
- Born: May 16, 1982 (age 44); Huntington Beach, California, U.S.
- Listed height: 6 ft 0 in (1.83 m)
- Listed weight: 300 lb (136 kg)

Career information
- High school: Fountain Valley (CA)
- College: Utah
- NFL draft: 2006: undrafted

Career history
- Miami Dolphins (2006)*; Frankfurt Galaxy (2007); Miami Dolphins (2007); New England Patriots (2008)*; Alabama Vipers (2010)
- * Offseason or practice squad member only

Awards and highlights
- 2× First-team All-MW (2004, 2005); Fiesta Bowl Defensive MVP (2005)

Career NFL statistics
- Total tackles: 11
- Stats at Pro Football Reference

Steve Fifita (born May 16, 1982) is an Americanfootball coach and former profession player who is currently the defensive coordinator for the Santa Margarita Eagles.He was a defensive tackle in the National Football League (NFL). He was originally signed by the Miami Dolphins as an undrafted free agent in 2006. He played college football for the Utah Utes.

== Early life ==
Fifita was twice an all-conference selection as well as an all-county selection at Fountain Valley High School in Fountain Valley, California. He was the team captain and defensive player of the year for the football team. In 1999, he made 62 unassisted tackles, 17 tackles for a loss and recovered four fumbles including one returned for a touchdown. On offense, he scored on runs of 55 and 65 yards.

== College career ==
After being redshirted his freshman year at the University of Utah in 2001, Fifita played in 11 games including one start as a redshirt freshman in 2002. On the year, he had 16 total tackles, 1.5 tackles for loss, one interception for 14 yards, two fumble recoveries and one pass breakup.

Fifita started all 12 games at nose guard during the 2003 season, earning an honorable mention All-Mountain West Conference selection. On the year he had 31 tackles, 8 tackles for a loss and three sacks. He posted a career-high six tackles against Texas A&M.

As a junior in 2004, Fifita experienced a breakout season. He once again started all 12 games at nose guard and earned a first-team All-Mountain West selection with 45 tackles, nine tackles for a loss and 4.5 sacks. His 23 solo tackles were the most by a Utes lineman during the year while his sack total tied him for the team lead.

During a 35–7 rout of Pittsburgh in the Fiesta Bowl, Fifita had five tackles, two tackles for a loss and a 12-yard sack in a performance that earned him defensive MVP honors.

Fifita earned his second consecutive All-Mountain West selection as a senior in 2005 with 44 tackles, 14 tackles for a loss and six sacks.

== Professional career ==
=== Pre-draft ===
Prior to the NFL draft, Fifita was clocked at 5.16 seconds in the 40-yard dash.

=== Miami Dolphins ===
He went undrafted and signed a free agent contract with the Miami Dolphins on May 1. On August 29, Fifita was waived from the team. He worked out for the Minnesota Vikings the following October but was not signed.

Despite a new head coach in Miami, Fifita was signed to a future contract by the Dolphins on during the 2007 offseason. He played for the Frankfurt Galaxy of NFL Europa in the spring, and made the team's 53-man roster out of training camp.

Fifita was released by the Dolphins on April 29, 2008.

=== New England Patriots ===
On May 5, 2008, Fifita was signed by the New England Patriots. Fifita was among the last cuts by the New England Patriots on August 29, 2008 before the final 53 man regular season roster.

== Coaching ==
Fifita began coaching the defensive line at Idaho State University in 2012. He was later the defensive line coach at Mater Dei High School in Santa Ana, California. In 2023, he was named defensive coordinator at Santa Margarita Catholic High School. He served as interim head coach there in 2024 before returning to the defensive coordinator role in 2025.

== Personal ==
- Majored in sociology at Utah.
- Married to high school sweetheart, Heidi Glatt Fifita. They have 3 daughters: Makayla Melenaite, Nia Christine and Malia Melevesi.
- Is a distant cousin of former WWE wrestler Tonga Fifita (Haku).
- Utah Utes bio
