= 2004 Pittsburgh Panthers football team =

American college football season

2004 Pittsburgh Panthers football

Big East co-champion

Fiesta Bowl, L 7–35 vs. Utah
- Conference: Big East Conference

Ranking
- AP: No. 25
- Record: 8–4 (4–2 Big East)
- Head coach: Walt Harris (8th season)
- Offensive scheme: West Coast
- Defensive coordinator: Paul Rhoads (5th season)
- Base defense: Multiple 8-man front
- Home stadium: Heinz Field

2004 Big East Conference football standings
	Conf.			Overall
Team	W		L	W		L
No. 21 Boston College +	4	–	2	9	–	3
No. 25 Pittsburgh $+	4	–	2	8	–	4
West Virginia +	4	–	2	8	–	4
Syracuse +	4	–	2	6	–	6
Connecticut	3	–	3	8	–	4
Rutgers	1	–	5	4	–	7
Temple	1	–	5	2	–	9
$ – BCS representative as conference champion; + – Conference co-champions; Rankings from AP Poll

The 2004 Pittsburgh Panthers football team represented the University of Pittsburgh in the 2004 NCAA Division I-A football season. Pittsburgh won a share of The Big East Conference championship and were awarded with a BCS berth to the 2005 Fiesta Bowl.

== Schedule ==
Date	Time	Opponent	Rank	Site	TV	Result	Attendance
September 11	7:00 p.m.	Ohio*		Heinz Field; Pittsburgh, PA		W 24–3	46,401
September 18	12:00 p.m.	Nebraska*		Heinz Field; Pittsburgh, PA	ABC	L 17–24	40,133
September 25	1:00 p.m.	No. 2 (I-AA) Furman*		Heinz Field; Pittsburgh, PA		W 41–38 ^{OT}	35,121
September 30	7:00 p.m.	at Connecticut		Rentschler Field; East Hartford, CT	ESPN2	L 17–29	40,000
October 9	12:00 p.m.	at Temple		Lincoln Financial Field; Philadelphia, PA	ESPN+	W 27–22	19,517
October 16	12:00 p.m.	Boston College		Heinz Field; Pittsburgh, PA	ESPN2	W 20–17 ^{OT}	34,071
October 23	12:00 p.m.	Rutgers^{†}		Heinz Field; Pittsburgh, PA	ESPN+	W 41–17	41,232
November 6	12:00 p.m.	at Syracuse		Carrier Dome; Syracuse, NY (rivalry)	ESPN+	L 31–38 ^{2OT}	37,211
November 13	2:30 p.m.	at No. 24 Notre Dame*		Notre Dame Stadium; Notre Dame, IN (rivalry)	NBC	W 41–38	80,795
November 25	8:00 p.m.	No. 21 West Virginia		Heinz Field; Pittsburgh, PA (Backyard Brawl)	ESPN	W 16–13	52,641
December 4	11:00 a.m.	at South Florida*	No. 19	Raymond James Stadium; Tampa, FL	ESPN2	W 43–14	23,417
January 1	8:30 p.m.	vs. No. 5 Utah*	No. 19	Sun Devil Stadium; Tempe, AZ (Fiesta Bowl)	ABC	L 7–35	73,519
*Non-conference game; ^{†}Homecoming; Rankings from AP Poll released prior to the game; All times are in Eastern time

== Personnel ==
2004 Pittsburgh Panthers football team roster
Players
Coaches
Offense

Pos.	#	Name	Class
RB	49	Justin Acierno	Jr
TE	84	Steve Buches	So
RB	38	Kellen Campbell	Fr
WR		Kelvin Chandler	Fr
WR		Steven Brana	Fr
WR	4	Joe DelSardo	Fr
QB		Joe Flacco	Fr
RB	2	Marcus Furman	Jr
TE	45	Erik Gill	Jr
WR	81	Derek Kinder	Fr
RB	43	Raymond Kirkley	Jr
WR	86	Greg Lee	So
OL		Matt Maiers
RB		Brandon Mason	Fr
RB	26	Darren McCray	Jr
OL	75	Mike McGlynn	Fr
RB	40	Tom Mikula	So
RB	23	Tim Murphy	Jr
QB	3	Tyler Palko	So
OL	78	Rob Petitti	Sr
RB	41	John Pettiford	Fr
WR	7	Allen Richardson	Fr
OL	60	John Simonitis	So
OL	56	Charles Spencer	Jr
QB	14	Darrell Strong	Fr
C	68	Joe Villani	Fr
OL		Dale Williams

Defense

Pos.	#	Name	Class
DL	41	Azzie Beagnyam	So
LB	44	Brian Bennett	So
LB	51	H.B. Blades	So
DL	98	Vernon Botts	Fr
LB	24	Jameel Brady	Fr
DB	46	Sam Bryant	So
DB	21	Reggie Carter	So
DL	58	Joe Clermond	Fr
DB	5	Kennard Cox	Fr
DL	96	Vince Crochunis	Sr
DB	31	Tyler Gilliard	Sr
DL	95	Keith Hill	Jr
DL	93	Jake Holthaus	Sr
LB	9	J.J. Horne	Jr
DL	52	Ron Idoko	Fr
DB	12	Bernard Lay	Jr
LB	19	Keith Malley	Fr
DL	41	Chris McKillop	Fr
DB	20	Tez Morris	Jr
DB	10	Mike Phillips	Fr
LB	6	Malcolm Postell	Sr
DB		Allen Richardson
DB	25	Darrelle Revis	Fr
LB	30	Doug Roseberry	Fr
DL	54	Charles Sallett	So
LB	17	Clint Session	So
DL	88	Kyle Smith	Fr
DL	55	Thomas Smith	Jr
DL	94	Dan Stephens	Sr
DL	91	Phil Tillman	Fr

Special teams

Pos.	#	Name	Class
PK	22	Josh Cummings	Jr
P	18	Adam Graessle	So
P	8	Nick Krut	Fr
LB	43	Michael Toomalatai	Fr

Head coach

- Walt Harris

Coordinators/assistant coaches

- Jeff Ambrosie
- Mike Antonoplos
- Bill Bleil
- Curtis Bray
- Pete Carmichael
- Bryan Deal
- Tom Freeman
- Darren Honeycutt
- Bob Junko
- Mike Kent
- Scott McCurley
- Wayne Moses
- Charlie Partridge
- Paul Rhoads

Legend

- (C) Team captain
- (S) Suspended
- (I) Ineligible
- Injured
- Redshirt

Roster
Last update: 2015-12-20

== Team players drafted into the NFL ==
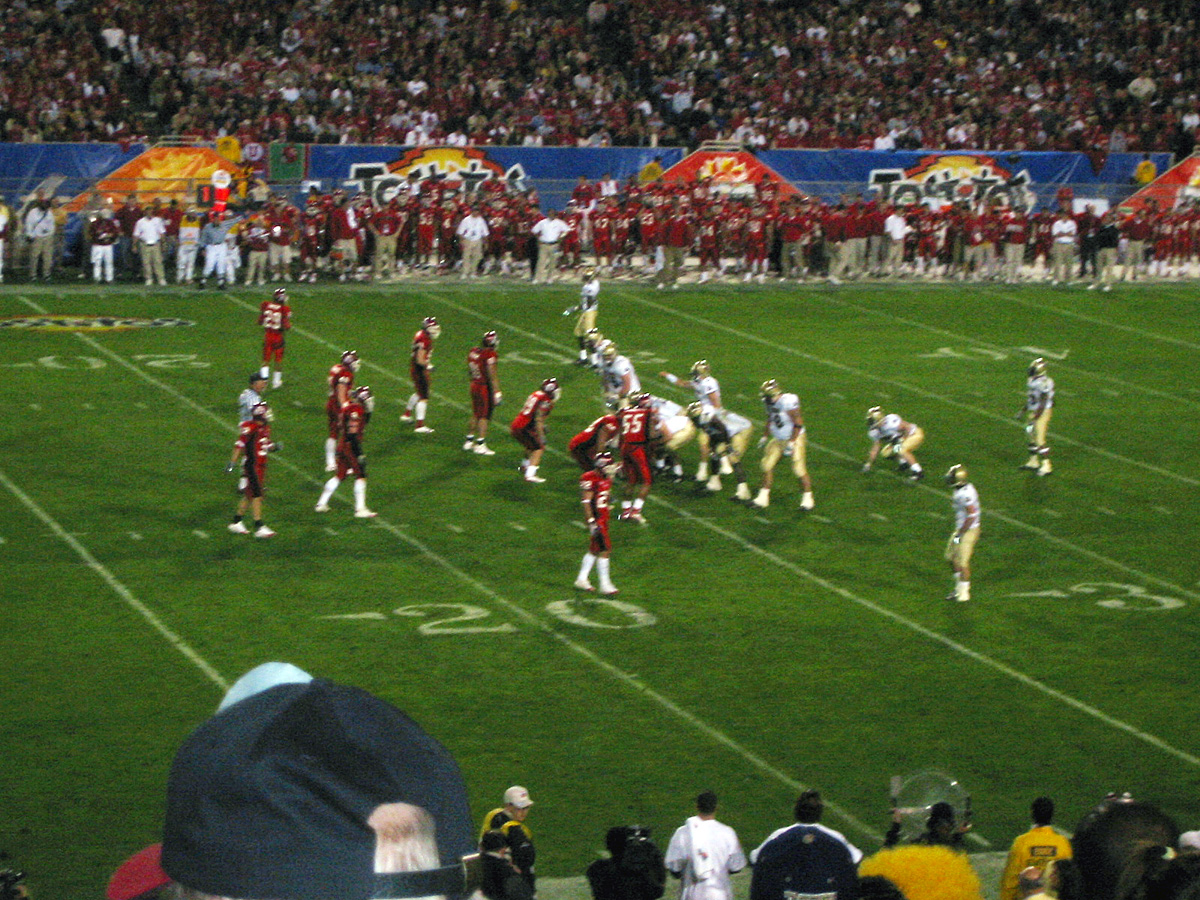
January 1, 2005 Fiesta Bowl

Player	Position	Round	Pick	NFL club
Rob Pettiti	Tackle	6	209	Dallas Cowboys
