= Carl Harry =

American football player (born 1967)

No. 89, 24, 86
- Position: Wide receiver

Personal information
- Born: October 26, 1967 (age 59); Fountain Valley, California, U.S.
- Listed height: 5 ft 9 in (1.75 m)
- Listed weight: 168 lb (76 kg)

Career information
- High school: Fountain Valley
- College: Utah
- NFL draft: 1989: undrafted

Career history
- Washington Redskins (1989); Houston Oilers (1990)*; Washington Redskins (1990-1991)*; Phoenix Cardinals (1992)*; Washington Redskins (1992); Las Vegas Posse (1994)
- * Offseason or practice squad member only

Awards and highlights
- Super Bowl champion (XXVI); First-team All-WAC (1988)
- Stats at Pro Football Reference

Carl David Harry (born October 26, 1967) is an American former professional football player who was a wide receiver in the National Football League (NFL) for the Washington Redskins and for the Las Vegas Posse of the Canadian Football League (CFL). He played college football for the Utah Utes.
