= 2005 Fiesta Bowl =

2005 Tostitos Fiesta Bowl
- BCS Bowl Game; 34th Fiesta Bowl
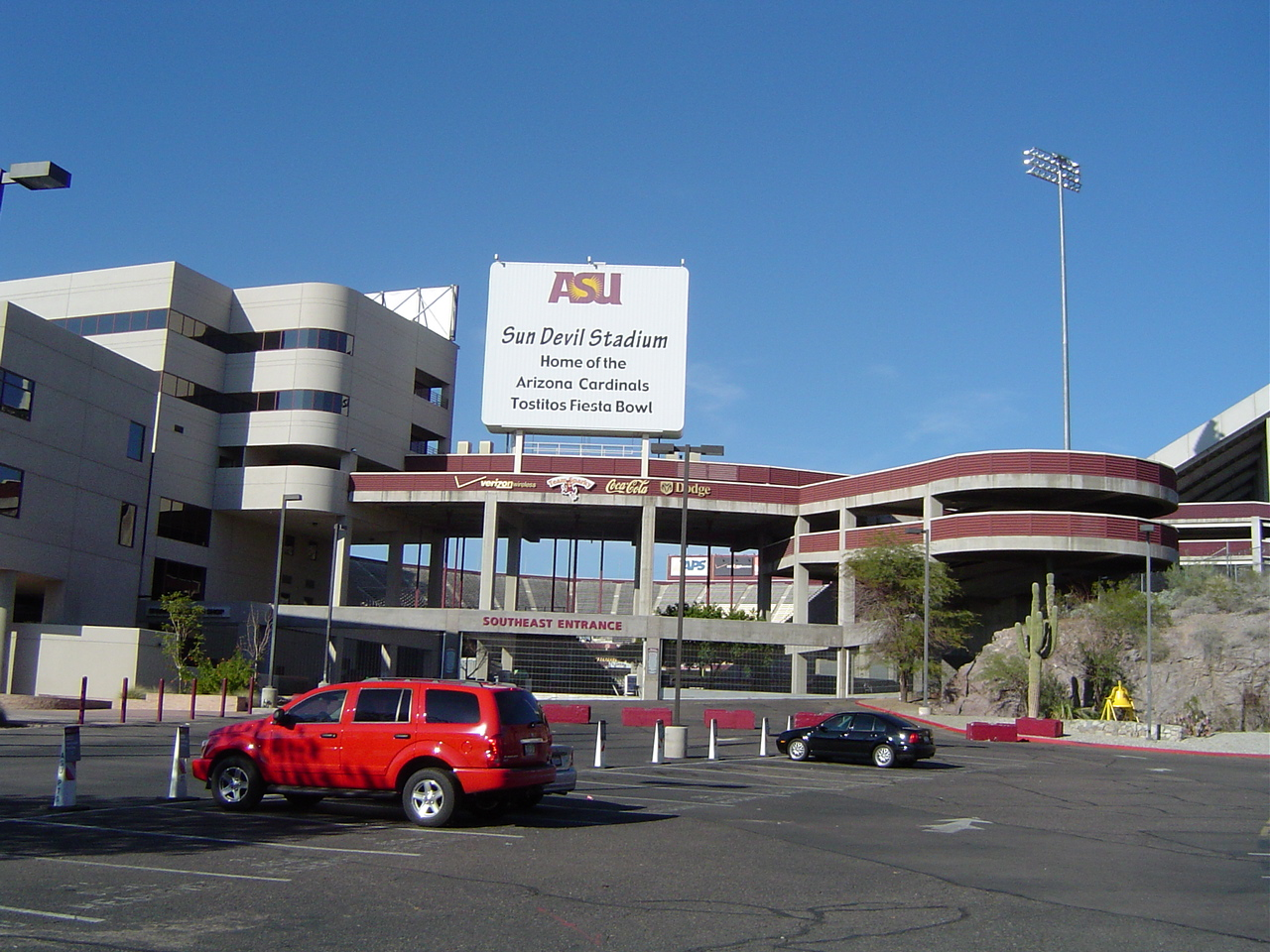
- Sun Devil Stadium in Tempe, Arizona, hosted the Fiesta Bowl (pictured in 2004).
Pittsburgh Panthers	Utah Utes
(8–3)	(11–0)
Big East	Mountain West
7	35
Head coach: Walt Harris	Head coach: Urban Meyer
AP / Coaches / BCS; 19 / 20 / 21	AP / Coaches / BCS; 5 / 6 / 6
	1	2	3	4	Total
Pittsburgh	0	0	7	0	7
Utah	7	7	21	0	35
- Date: January 1, 2005
- Season: 2004
- Stadium: Sun Devil Stadium
- Location: Tempe, Arizona
- MVP: QB Alex Smith, WR Paris Warren, DT Steve Fifita
- Favorite: Utah by 16
- Referee: Gordon Riese (Pac-10)
- Attendance: 73,519

United States TV coverage
- Network: ABC
- Announcers: Brent Musburger, Gary Danielson
- Nielsen ratings: 7.4

The 2005 Tostitos Fiesta Bowl, played on January 1, 2005, was the 34th edition of the Fiesta Bowl. The game was played between Utah and Pittsburgh, in front of 73,519 fans. It is notable for being the first BCS game to feature a team from a BCS non-AQ conference.

== Background ==
=== Utah ===
In 2003, the University of Utah hired Urban Meyer from Bowling Green. In his first season, the team went 10–2 and won the Mountain West championship for their first outright championship since winning the Skyline Conference in 1957; ranked 25th in the polls, they beat Southern Miss in a victory at the Liberty Bowl. The 2004 team was expected to contend, being ranked 20th in the AP Poll to start the season, which began with a 41–21 over Texas A&M. Leading up to their game against UNLV, they were 6-0 and ranked 9th in the country. In a high-powered spread offense led by quarterback Alex Smith, the Utes ran the table with victory after victory, which culminated with a 52–21 over their in-state rival BYU to clinch an undefeated regular season, making them one of just four teams with an unbeaten regular season. In the BCS rankings (which started after week 8 as the last season that utilized the AP rankings), they started at 7th and eventually made it to 6th to rank among the highest of teams in a non-automatic qualifying conference that guaranteed an invitation for a prominent bowl game.

Four days after the win over BYU, Meyer had a meeting with a leader in the athletic program of the University of Florida. Suitors from Notre Dame soon tried to make a push to hire Meyer. On December 3, Meyer had come to an agreement with Florida to become their head coach for the 2005 season, with it becoming officially on December 6. Defensive coordinator & linebackers coach Kyle Whittingham was offered the coaching position for both Utah and his alma mater Brigham Young University, with Wittingham deciding after four days of consideration to become the next head coach of the Utes on December 8. For the game, both men acted as co-head coaches of the Fiesta Bowl and the NCAA officially credits the game to both of them.

=== Pittsburgh ===
Pittsburgh was in their 8th season with Walt Harris as head coach. In his first season, he led them to their first bowl game in eight years in the 1997 Liberty Bowl; the Panthers went to four bowl games in his next six seasons. Pittsburgh started 2004 with two victories in their first four games, which included a narrow overtime win over Division I-AA ranked Furman. The Panthers won five of their next six games, which included a victory over #24 ranked Notre Dame before defeating rival and #21 West Virginia to finish in a three-way tie for the Big East Conference regular season championship with Boston College and West Virginia, who both had been defeated by the Panthers. In the final rankings of the BCS in Week 14 on December 5, the BCS ranked Utah 6th, Pittsburgh was ranked 21st, Boston College was ranked 25th while West Virginia wasn't ranked. For the four major BCS bowl games (Orange, Sugar, Rose, Fiesta), the teams selected included the conference champion from each of the six Automatic Qualifying conferences (Pac-10, Big 12, Big Ten, ACC, Big East, SEC) and two at-large teams, and Utah qualified as one of the at-large teams alongside Texas (ranked 4th), with Utah being the first at-large to not come from the AQ conferences in the BCS era while Pittsburgh would serve as the Big East representative.

It was Pittsburgh's most prominent bowl appearance since the 1984 Fiesta Bowl. Unusually, this would also rank as the last game for Harris at Pittsburgh. He had spent much of the 2004 season trying to get a contract extension with the athletic department, with his agent (who he subsequently fired after the season) even publicly pressuring the university to give his client a new contract and making comments critical of the program during the season, accusing them of not giving him public support. A meeting prior to the bowl game led to him deciding to inquire further about the University of Stanford, with Harris deciding to accept the job on December 12 while coaching the Fiesta Bowl.

== Game summary ==
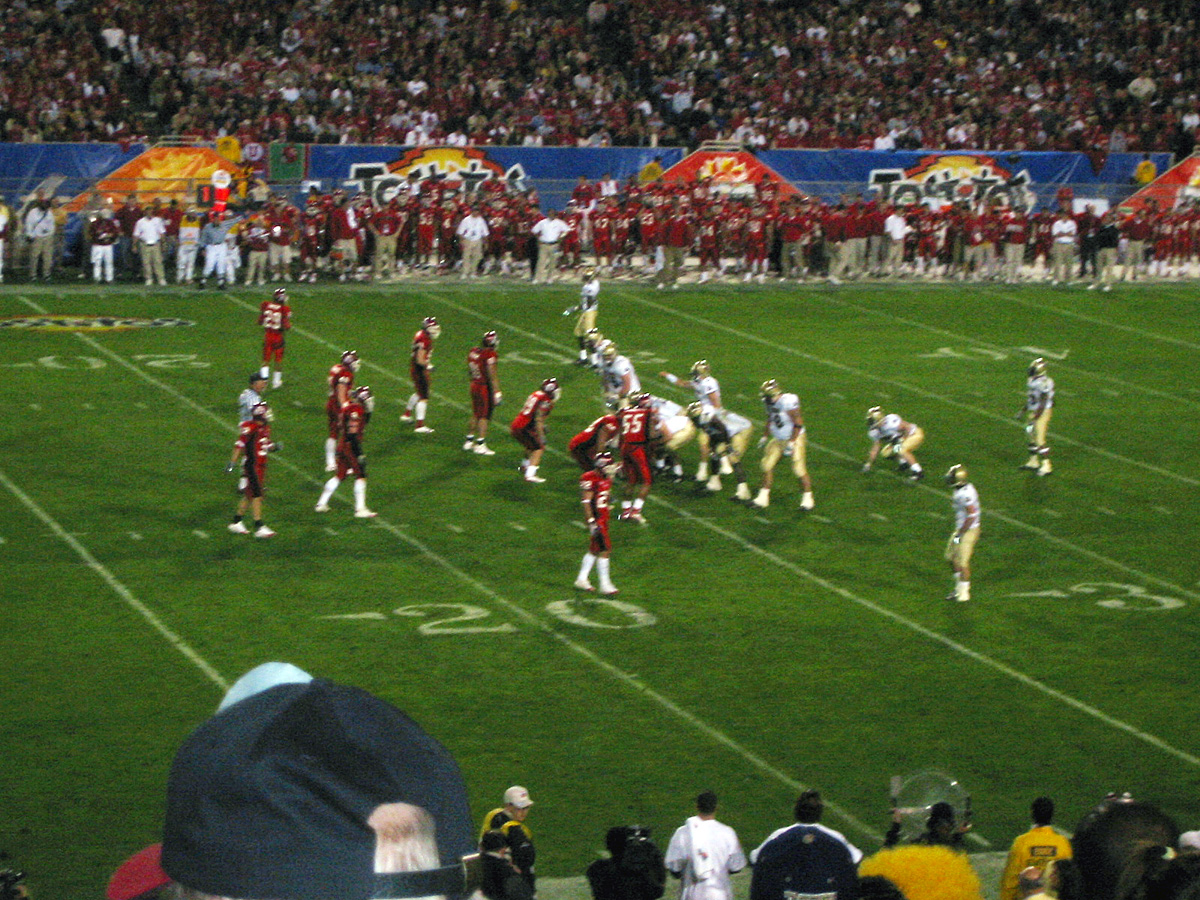
2005 Fiesta Bowl

Utah raced to a 28–0 lead and held on for a convincing 35–7 win. Alex Smith completed 29 of 37 passes for 328 yards and 4 touchdowns, earning the Fiesta Bowl MVP. Paris Warren was Smith's go-to man during the game, as he caught a Fiesta Bowl record 15 passes for 198 yards and 2 touchdowns. On the other side, Tyler Palko went 22-of-40 for 251 yards with one touchdown but ran 14 times for -44 yards.

== Scoring summary ==
Scoring Play	Score
1st quarter
Utah – Quinton Ganther 4-yard run (David Carroll kick). 3:09	Utah 7–0
2nd quarter
Utah – John Madsen 6-yard pass from Alex Smith (David Carroll kick). 5:29	Utah 14–0
3rd quarter
Utah – Marty Johnson 18-yard pass from Alex Smith (David Carroll kick). 11:13	Utah 21–0
Utah – Paris Warren 23-yard pass from Alex Smith (David Carroll kick). 6:22	Utah 28–0
Pittsburgh – Greg Lee 31-yard pass from Tyler Palko (Josh Cummings kick). 4:28	Utah 28–7
Utah – Paris Warren 18-yard pass from Alex Smith (David Carroll kick). 0:25	Utah 35–7

=== Statistics ===
Statistics	Utah	Pittsburgh
First downs	25	19
Rushing yards	139	17
Passing yards	328	251
Total Yards	467	268
Punts-Average	1-28.0	5-36.0
Fumbles-Lost	1-1	0-0
Interceptions	0	1
Penalties-Yards	7-51	3-30

== Aftermath ==
Utah was the first of five programs from a non-AQ conference to reach a BCS bowl game until its discontinuation on the closure of the 2013 NCAA Division I FBS football season. The next non-AQ team to reach a BCS bowl game would be Boise State in the 2007 Fiesta Bowl (Utah, alongside Boise State and fellow Mountain West member TCU were the only non-AQ members to reach a BCS bowl multiple times).

Kyle Wittingham would keep the ship steady in his tenure with the program, which started with winning bowl games in each of his first five seasons. In 2008, the Utes would run the table and win the Mountain West championship, which included victories over 11th-ranked TCU and 16th-ranked BYU to earn an invitation to compete in the 2009 Sugar Bowl as a non-qualifier conference selection once again, this time playing against 4th ranked Alabama. They defeated them to become the first non-qualifier to win two BCS bowls, with one selector in Anderson & Hester going so far as to select Utah as the national champion. Utah joined the prominent conferences in 2011 with the Pac-12 Conference, with their first prominent bowl appearance being the 2022 Rose Bowl.

Pittsburgh replaced Harris as coach with Dave Wannstedt, who would win one bowl game in six seasons with the program. In the two decades since the Fiesta Bowl loss, the Panthers have reached a bowl game fourteen times but have finished ranked in the AP Poll at the end of a season just three times.

== See also ==
- List of historically significant college football games
