= Paris Warren =

American football player (born 1982)

No. 82
- Position: Wide receiver

Personal information
- Born: September 6, 1982 (age 44); Sacramento, California, U.S.
- Listed height: 6 ft 1 in (1.85 m)
- Listed weight: 211 lb (96 kg)

Career information
- High school: Grant Union (Sacramento)
- College: Utah
- NFL draft: 2005: 7th round, 225th overall pick

Career history
- Tampa Bay Buccaneers (2005–2008); Dallas Cowboys (2008)*; Tampa Bay Buccaneers (2009)*; New Orleans Saints (2009)*; Florida Tuskers (2009)
- * Offseason or practice squad member only

Awards and highlights
- First-team All-MW (2003); Second-team All-MW (2004); Fiesta Bowl Offensive Co-MVP (2005)

Career NFL statistics
- Receptions: 5
- Receiving yards: 63
- Stats at Pro Football Reference

Paris Jazz Warren (born September 6, 1982) is an American former professional football player who was a wide receiver in the National Football League (NFL). He was selected by the Tampa Bay Buccaneers in the seventh round of the 2005 NFL draft. He played college football for the Utah Utes.

Warren was also a member of the Dallas Cowboys, New Orleans Saints, and Florida Tuskers.

== College career ==
=== Oregon ===
Warren played his freshman season at the University of Oregon in 2001, catching no passes but recording six special teams tackles. After his redshirt freshman year he transferred to the University of Utah.

=== Utah ===
Warren attended the University of Utah and was a two-year starter under head coach Urban Meyer after playing at Grant Union High School. In his senior year, Warren played a key part in the Utah Utes offense, as they went 12–0 and became the first BCS non-AQ conference team to play in a Bowl Championship Series bowl game. Utah defeated the Big East Conference champion Pittsburgh Panthers 35–7 to become the 2005 Fiesta Bowl champions. Against Pittsburgh, Warren was part of a rare trick play called the hook-and-ladder, or hook and lateral, in which quarterback Alex Smith threw a short pass to wide out Steve Savoy who then lateraled the ball to Warren. Warren proceeded to carry the ball into the endzone from just inside the Panthers 20-yard line. Warren finished the game with a Fiesta Bowl-record 15 receptions and 198 yards. Warren's 80 catches in a season in 2004–05 remains the Utah single season record.

=== Statistics ===
YEAR	REC	YDS	AVG	LNG	TD	ATT	YDS	AVG	LNG	TD	FUM	LST
2003	76	809	10.6	61	4	20	124	6.2	29	1	0	0
2004	80	1076	13.5	65	12	28	157	5.6	17	2	0	0

== Professional career ==
=== Tampa Bay Buccaneers (first stint) ===
Warren was selected in the seventh round of the 2005 NFL draft by the Tampa Bay Buccaneers. After spending the first five weeks of the season on the 53-man roster, he was waived and spent the rest of the 2005 season on the Buccaneers' practice squad. He made the team in 2006, playing in eight games and recording five catches for 63 yards.

Warren broke his leg catching a touchdown with three minutes left in the final game of the 2007 preseason. The injury forced him to spend the 2007 season on injured reserve.

Warren was released by the Buccaneers on August 26, 2008. He was re-signed to the team's practice squad on October 22, but released again on October 29.

=== Dallas Cowboys ===
Warren was signed to the practice squad of the Dallas Cowboys on December 10, 2008, and remained there through the 2008 season.

=== Tampa Bay Buccaneers (second stint) ===
Warren re-signed a future contract with the Buccaneers in January 2009. He was waived on May 4.

=== New Orleans Saints ===
Warren signed with the New Orleans Saints on May 22, 2009. He was waived on August 27.

=== Florida Tuskers ===
Warren was signed by the Florida Tuskers in 2009. He was released on November 15, 2009.
