= 2008 Arizona Wildcats football team =

American college football season

2008 Arizona Wildcats football

Las Vegas Bowl champion

Las Vegas Bowl, W 31–21 vs. BYU
- Conference: Pacific-10 Conference
- Record: 8–5 (5–4 Pac-10)
- Head coach: Mike Stoops (5th season)
- Offensive coordinator: Sonny Dykes (2nd season)
- Offensive scheme: Air raid
- Defensive coordinator: Mark Stoops (5th season)
- Base defense: 4–3
- Home stadium: Arizona Stadium

Uniform

2008 Pacific-10 Conference football standings
	Conf.			Overall
Team	W		L	W		L
No. 3 USC $	8	–	1	12	–	1
No. 10 Oregon	7	–	2	10	–	3
No. 18 Oregon State	7	–	2	9	–	4
California	6	–	3	9	–	4
Arizona	5	–	4	8	–	5
Arizona State	4	–	5	5	–	7
Stanford	4	–	5	5	–	7
UCLA	3	–	6	4	–	8
Washington State	1	–	8	2	–	11
Washington	0	–	9	0	–	12
$ – Conference champion; Rankings from AP Poll

The 2008 Arizona Wildcats football team represented the University of Arizona in the 2008 NCAA Division I FBS football season. The team's head coach was Mike Stoops, in his fifth year at Arizona. The Wildcats played their home games at Arizona Stadium in Tucson, Arizona and compete in the Pacific-10 Conference. Arizona finished the 2008 regular season with a record of 7–5, and faced BYU in the Las Vegas Bowl on December 20, their first postseason appearance since 1998; they defeated the Cougars 31–21 for a final record of 8–5. In that game, the Wildcats' 31 points were the most put up by the team in any of their bowl appearances. Senior wide receiver Mike Thomas, playing in his final game as a Wildcat, also got the Pac-10 record of most receptions by any wide receiver in the Pac-10. Senior Quarterback Willie Tuitama was named MVP for the 2008 Las Vegas Bowl, by throwing 328 yards, 2 pass TD's and 1 rush TD.

== Schedule ==
Date	Time	Opponent	Site	TV	Result	Attendance
August 30	7:00 p.m.	Idaho*	Arizona Stadium; Tucson, Arizona		W 70–0	47,511
September 6	7:00 p.m.	Toledo*	Arizona Stadium; Tucson, Arizona		W 41–16	50,939
September 13	5:00 p.m.	at New Mexico*	University Stadium; Albuquerque, New Mexico		L 28–36	32,337
September 20	Noon	at UCLA	Rose Bowl; Pasadena, California	FSN	W 31–10	65,434
October 4	4:30 p.m.	Washington	Arizona Stadium; Tucson, Arizona	Versus	W 48–14	55,624
October 11	2:00 p.m.	at Stanford	Stanford Stadium; Stanford, California		L 23–24	30,689
October 18	7:00 p.m.	No. 25 California	Arizona Stadium; Tucson, Arizona	FSNAZ	W 42–27	48,372
October 25	7:15 p.m.	No. 4 USC^{†}	Arizona Stadium; Tucson, Arizona	FSN	L 10–17	57,427
November 8	2:00 p.m.	at Washington State	Martin Stadium; Pullman, Washington		W 59–28	24,118
November 15	12:30 p.m.	at Oregon	Autzen Stadium; Eugene, Oregon	FSNAZ	L 45–55	58,369
November 22	4:00 p.m.	No. 21 Oregon State	Arizona Stadium; Tucson, Arizona	Versus	L 17–19	48,503
December 6	6:00 p.m.	Arizona State	Arizona Stadium; Tucson, Arizona (Territorial Cup)	ESPN	W 31–10	58,704
December 20	6:00 p.m.	No. 17 BYU*	Sam Boyd Stadium; Whitney, Nevada (Las Vegas Bowl)	ESPN	W 31–21	40,047
*Non-conference game; ^{†}Homecoming; Rankings from AP Poll released prior to the game; All times are in Mountain time

Schedule source: 2008 Arizona Wildcats football schedule

== Game summaries ==
=== vs Idaho ===
Idaho Vandals (0–0) vs Arizona Wildcats (0–0) – Game summary

Quarter	1	2	3	4	Total
Vandals	0	0	0	0	0
Wildcats	14	35	7	14	70

at Arizona Stadium • Tucson, AZ

- Date: August 30, 2008
- Game time: 7:00 p.m.
- Game weather: Mostly cloudy, 88 °F (31 °C)
- Game attendance: 47,511
- Referee: Larry Farina

Game information

First quarter

- (10:35) ARIZ – Nic Grigsby 1-yard run, Jason Bondzio kick (Drive: 11 plays, 80 yards, 4:25; Arizona 7–0)
- (1:15) ARIZ – Mike Thomas 5-yard pass from Willie Tuitama, Jason Bondzio kick (Drive: 4 plays, 62 yards, 1:41; Arizona 14–0)

Second quarter

- (13:17) ARIZ – Marquis Hundley 87-yard punt return, Jason Bondzio kick (Arizona 21–0)
- (9:24) ARIZ – Chris Gronkowski 12-yard pass from Willie Tuitama, Jason Bondzio kick (Drive: 4 plays, 43 yards, 2:00; Arizona 28–0)
- (4:44) ARIZ – Nic Grigsby 2-yard run, Jason Bondzio kick (Drive: 7 plays, 40 yards, 3:43; Arizona 35–0)
- (1:33) ARIZ – Keola Antolin 3-yard run, Jason Bondzio kick (Drive: 4 plays, 67 yards, 1:31; Arizona 42–0)
- (0:09) ARIZ – Terrell Turner 3-yard pass from Willie Tuitama, Alex Zendejas kick (Drive: 6 plays, 55 yards, 0:39; Arizona 49–0)

Third quarter

- (3:23) ARIZ – Matt Scott 5-yard run, Jason Bondzio kick (Drive: 2 plays, 13 yards, 0:44; Arizona 56–0)

Fourth quarter

- (10:52) ARIZ – Nick Booth 7-yard pass from Matt Scott, Alex Zendejas kick (Drive: 3 plays, 11 yards, 1:24; Arizona 63–0)
- (7:27) ARIZ – Xavier Smith 1-yard run, Alex Zendejas kick (Drive: 4 plays, 30 yards, 1:58; Arizona 70–0)

Statistics	IDA	ARIZ
First downs	7	27
Total yards	112	521
Rushing yards	25–64	49–265
Passing yards	48	265
Passing: Comp–Att–Int	10–27–4	23–31–0
Time of possession	23:55	36:05

Team	Category	Player	Statistics
Idaho	Passing	Nathan Enderle	10/25, 48 yards, 3 INT
Idaho	Rushing	Deonte Jackson	10 carries, 25 yards
Idaho	Receiving	Eddie Williams	3 receptions, 18 yards
Arizona	Passing	Willie Tuitama	17/21, 179 yards, 3 TD
Arizona	Rushing	Nic Grigsby	19 carries, 169 yards, 2 TD
Arizona	Receiving	Delashaun Dean	5 receptions, 77 yards

In the 2008 season opener, Arizona would dominate in this 70–0 shutout over the visiting Vandals of Idaho. For the game, the Wildcats would outgain the Vandals in total offense 521 to 112 yards. The game also marked the most points scored in a game by Arizona since a 74-0 victory in 1921 over the Texas College of Mines and Metallurgy in addition to its first shutout since the 1996 season.

=== vs Toledo ===
Toledo Rockets (0–0) vs Arizona Wildcats (1–0) – Game summary

Quarter	1	2	3	4	Total
Rockets	0	6	3	7	16
Wildcats	10	14	3	14	41

at Arizona Stadium • Tucson, AZ

- Date: September 6, 2008
- Game time: 7:00 p.m.
- Game weather: Partly cloudy, 99 °F (37 °C)
- Game attendance: 50,939
- Referee: Jack Wood

Game information

First quarter

- (4:45) ARIZ – Jason Bondzio 20-yard field goal (Drive: 9 plays, 69 yards, 5:21; Arizona 3–0)
- (0:30) ARIZ – Nic Grigsby 7-yard run, Jason Bondzio kick (Drive: 8 plays, 67 yards, 3:00; Arizona 10–0)

Second quarter

- (9:20) TOL – Alex Steigerwald 20-yard field goal (Drive: 14 plays, 78 yards, 6:10; Arizona 10–3)
- (7:57) ARIZ – Nic Grigsby 27-yard run, Jason Bondzio kick (Drive: 3 plays, 53 yards, 1:12; Arizona 17–3)
- (5:28) TOL – Alex Steigerwald 35-yard field goal (Drive: 9 plays, 37 yards, 2:29; Arizona 17–6)
- (1:15) ARIZ – Nic Grigsby 11-yard run, Jason Bondzio kick (Drive: 8 plays, 56 yards, 4:05; Arizona 24–6)

Third quarter

- (9:22) ARIZ – Jason Bondzio 26-yard field goal (Drive: 11 plays, 43 yards, 5:30; Arizona 27–6)
- (3:17) TOL – Alex Steigerwald 21-yard field goal (Drive: 13 plays, 75 yards, 5:59; Arizona 27–9)

Fourth quarter

- (14:55) ARIZ – Delashaun Dean 7-yard pass from Willie Tuitama, Jason Bondzio kick (Drive: 8 plays, 68 yards, 3:15; Arizona 34–9)
- (12:52) TOL – Stephen Williams 3-yard pass from Aaron Opelt, Alex Steigerwald kick (Drive: 1 play, 3 yards, 0:06; Arizona 34–16)
- (3:27) ARIZ – Mike Thomas 12-yard pass from Willie Tuitama, Jason Bondzio kick (Drive: 7 plays, 58 yards, 3:52; Arizona 41–16)

Statistics	TOL	ARIZ
First downs	12	28
Total yards	244	452
Rushing yards	24–74	33–153
Passing yards	170	299
Passing: Comp–Att–Int	21–31–0	26–34–0
Time of possession	27:03	32:57

Team	Category	Player	Statistics
Toledo	Passing	Aaron Opelt	21/31, 170 yards, TD
Toledo	Rushing	DaJuane Collins	10 carries, 54 yards
Toledo	Receiving	Stephen Williams	12 receptions, 67 yards, TD
Arizona	Passing	Willie Tuitama	25/33, 292 yards, 2 TD
Arizona	Rushing	Nic Grigsby	20 carries, 135 yards, 3 TD
Arizona	Receiving	Mike Thomas	9 receptions, 138 yards, TD

=== at New Mexico ===
Arizona Wildcats (2–0) at New Mexico Lobos (0–2) – Game summary

Quarter	1	2	3	4	Total
Wildcats	7	7	7	7	28
Lobos	10	10	10	6	36

at University Stadium • Albuquerque, NM

- Date: September 13, 2008
- Game time: 5:00 p.m.
- Game weather: Clear, 80 °F (27 °C)
- Game attendance: 32,337
- Referee: Terry Leyden

Game information

First quarter

- (10:43) ARIZ – Mike Thomas 43-yard pass from Willie Tuitama, Jason Bondzio kick (Drive: 6 plays, 69 yards, 2:37; Arizona 7–0)
- (5:24) UNM – James Aho 24-yard field goal (Drive: 4 plays, 5 yards, 1:55; Arizona 7–3)
- (0:20) UNM – Donovan Porterie 25-yard pass from Rodney Ferguson, James Aho kick (Drive: 8 plays, 77 yards, 3:06; New Mexico 10–7)

Second quarter

- (13:00) UNM – James Aho 43-yard field goal (Drive: 4 plays, -2 yards, 1:30; New Mexico 13–7)
- (8:23) ARIZ – Delashaun Dean 15-yard pass from Willie Tuitama, Jason Bondzio kick (Drive: 10 plays, 72 yards, 4:26; Arizona 14–13)
- (1:35) UNM – Rodney Ferguson 25-yard run, James Aho kick (Drive: 3 plays, 39 yards, 1:09; New Mexico 20–14)

Third quarter

- (14:36) UNM – Rodney Ferguson 10-yard run, James Aho kick (Drive: 1 play, 10 yards, 0:06; New Mexico 27–14)
- (9:54) ARIZ – Nic Grigsby 4-yard run, Jason Bondzio kick (Drive: 11 plays, 69 yards, 4:34; New Mexico 27–21)
- (2:16) UNM – James Aho 48-yard field goal (Drive: 10 plays, 46 yards, 4:48; New Mexico 30–21)

Fourth quarter

- (14:55) UNM – James Aho 42-yard field goal (Drive: 4 plays, -2 yards, 1:58; New Mexico 33–21)
- (5:58) UNM – James Aho 46-yard field goal (Drive: 5 plays, 32 yards, 1:55; New Mexico 36–21)
- (4:38) ARIZ – Juron Criner 28-yard pass from Willie Tuitama, Jason Bondzio kick (Drive: 5 plays, 66 yards, 1:13; New Mexico 36–28)

Statistics	ARIZ	UNM
First downs	21	18
Total yards	388	335
Rushing yards	24–67	47–221
Passing yards	321	114
Passing: Comp–Att–Int	27–50–2	14–18–1
Time of possession	26:42	33:18

Team	Category	Player	Statistics
Arizona	Passing	Willie Tuitama	27/50, 321 yards, 3 TD, 2 INT
Arizona	Rushing	Nic Grigsby	18 carries, 72 yards, TD
Arizona	Receiving	Mike Thomas	12 receptions, 136 yards, TD
New Mexico	Passing	Donovan Porterie	13/17, 89 yards, INT
New Mexico	Rushing	Rodney Ferguson	26 carries, 158 yards, 2 TD
New Mexico	Receiving	Chris Hernandez	4 receptions, 39 yards

=== at UCLA ===
Arizona Wildcats (2–1) at UCLA Bruins (1–1) – Game summary

Quarter	1	2	3	4	Total
Wildcats	3	14	0	14	31
Bruins	7	3	0	0	10

at Rose Bowl • Pasadena, CA

- Date: September 20, 2008
- Game time: 12:00 p.m.
- Game weather: Light Haze, 82 °F (28 °C)
- Game attendance: 65,434
- Referee: Larry Farina
- TV announcers (FSN): Barry Tompkins (play-by-play), Petros Papadakis (analyst), Jim Watson (sideline reporter)

Game information

First quarter

- (9:21) ARIZ – Jason Bondzio 41-yard field goal (Drive: 5 plays, 29 yards, 1:57; Arizona 3–0)
- (3:41) UCLA – Korey Bosworth 1-yard fumble return, Kai Forbath kick (UCLA 7–3)

Second quarter

- (13:11) ARIZ – Rob Gronkowski 22-yard pass from Willie Tuitama, Jason Bondzio kick (Drive: 4 plays, 48 yards, 1:49; Arizona 10–7)
- (9:46) ARIZ – Nic Grigsby 3-yard run, Jason Bondzio kick (Drive: 4 plays, 57 yards, 1:20; Arizona 17–7)
- (0:00) UCLA – Kai Forbath 35-yard field goal (Drive: 11 plays, 64 yards, 4:26; Arizona 17–10)

Third quarter

- No scoring plays

Fourth quarter

- (12:49) ARIZ – Rob Gronkowski 4-yard pass from Willie Tuitama, Jason Bondzio kick (Drive: 5 plays, 26 yards, 1:43; Arizona 24–10)
- (6:48) ARIZ – Xavier Smith 8-yard run, Jason Bondzio kick (Drive: 8 plays, 75 yards, 3:32; Arizona 31–10)

Statistics	ARIZ	UCLA
First downs	15	11
Total yards	388	335
Rushing yards	35–111	28–115
Passing yards	222	81
Passing: Comp–Att–Int	16–29–0	15–31–0
Time of possession	29:08	30:52

Team	Category	Player	Statistics
Arizona	Passing	Willie Tuitama	16/29, 222 yards, 2 TD
Arizona	Rushing	Nic Grigsby	20 carries, 59 yards, TD
Arizona	Receiving	Mike Thomas	4 receptions, 115 yards
UCLA	Passing	Kevin Craft	15/31, 81 yards
UCLA	Rushing	Chane Moline	11 carries, 72 yards
UCLA	Receiving	Terrence Austin	5 receptions, 36 yards

=== vs Washington ===
Washington Huskies (0–4) vs Arizona Wildcats (3–1) – Game summary

Quarter	1	2	3	4	Total
Huskies	0	7	0	7	14
Wildcats	17	14	17	0	48

at Arizona Stadium • Tucson, AZ

- Date: October 4, 2008
- Game time: 4:30 p.m.
- Game weather: Cloudy, 84 °F (29 °C)
- Game attendance: 55,624
- Referee: Michael Batlan
- TV announcers (Versus): Joe Beninati (play-by-play), Kelly Stouffer (analyst), Lewis Johnson (sideline reporter)

Game information

First quarter

- (10:47) ARIZ – Jason Bondzio 29-yard field goal (Drive: 8 plays, 28 yards, 2:46; Arizona 3–0)
- (7:10) ARIZ – Rob Gronkowski 37-yard pass from Willie Tuitama, Jason Bondzio kick (Drive: 2 plays, 40 yards, 0:24; Arizona 10–0)
- (0:00) ARIZ – Nic Grigsby 4-yard run, Jason Bondzio kick (Drive: 6 plays, 72 yards, 3:15; Arizona 17–0)

Second quarter

- (11:55) WASH – Paul Homer 1-yard run, Ryan Perkins kick (Drive: 7 plays, 81 yards, 3:00; Arizona 17–7)
- (8:13) ARIZ – Mike Thomas 48-yard punt return, Jason Bondzio kick (Arizona 24–7)
- (3:58) ARIZ – Rob Gronkowski 9-yard pass from Willie Tuitama, Jason Bondzio kick (Drive: 5 plays, 34 yards, 2:10; Arizona 31–7)

Third quarter

- (10:50) ARIZ – Rob Gronkowski 8-yard pass from Willie Tuitama, Jason Bondzio kick (Drive: 8 plays, 75 yards, 4:08; Arizona 38–7)
- (5:42) ARIZ – Jason Bondzio 49-yard field goal (Drive: 8 plays, 46 yards, 3:26; Arizona 41–7)
- (0:38) ARIZ – Xavier Smith 2-yard run, Alex Zendejas kick (Drive: 6 plays, 70 yards, 2:46; Arizona 48–7)

Fourth quarter

- (8:33) WASH – Michael Gottlieb 20-yard pass from Ronnie Fouch, Ryan Perkins kick (Drive: 7 plays, 43 yards, 1:50; Arizona 48–14)

Statistics	WASH	ARIZ
First downs	12	28
Total yards	244	452
Rushing yards	28–63	51–256
Passing yards	181	193
Passing: Comp–Att–Int	12–28–1	17–21–0
Time of possession	23:48	36:07

Team	Category	Player	Statistics
Washington	Passing	Ronnie Fouch	12/28, 181 yards, TD, INT
Washington	Rushing	Brandon Jonhson	13 carries, 35 yards
Washington	Receiving	Jermaine Kearse	1 reception, 62 yards
Arizona	Passing	Willie Tuitama	25/33, 292 yards, 2 TD
Arizona	Rushing	Nic Grigsby	14 carries, 113 yards, TD
Arizona	Receiving	Rob Gronkowski	5 receptions, 109 yards, 3 TD

=== at Stanford ===
Arizona Wildcats (4–1) at Stanford Cardinal (3–3) – Game summary

Quarter	1	2	3	4	Total
Wildcats	3	14	0	6	23
Cardinal	7	3	7	7	24

at Stanford Stadium • Stanford, CA

- Date: October 11, 2008
- Game time: 2:00 p.m.
- Game weather: Sunny, 66 °F (19 °C)
- Game attendance: 30,689
- Referee: Brian O'Cain

Game information

First quarter

- (6:38) ARIZ – Jason Bondzio 19-yard field goal (Drive: 13 plays, 84 yards, 5:38; Arizona 3–0)
- (1:06) STAN – Doug Baldwin 3-yard pass from Tavita Pritchard, Aaron Zagory kick (Drive: 11 plays, 88 yards, 5:27; Stanford 7–3)

Second quarter

- (6:38) ARIZ – Nic Grigsby 25-yard run, Jason Bondzio kick (Drive: 3 plays, 54 yards, 1:05; Arizona 10–7)
- (3:35) ARIZ – Nate Ness 75-yard interception return, Jason Bondzio kick (Arizona 17–7)
- (0:09) STAN – Aaron Zagory 22-yard field goal (Drive: 11 plays, 56 yards, 3:16; Arizona 17–10)

Third quarter

- (4:20) STAN – Anthony Kimble 1-yard run, Aaron Zagory kick (Drive: 5 plays, 84 yards, 2:19; Tied 17–17)

Fourth quarter

- (11:55) ARIZ – Jason Bondzio 22-yard field goal (Drive: 12 plays, 89 yards, 3:59; Arizona 20–17)
- (5:48) ARIZ – Jason Bondzio 23-yard field goal (Drive: 10 plays, 50 yards, 4:28; Arizona 23–17)
- (0:25) STAN – Toby Gerhart 1-yard run, Aaron Zagory kick (Drive: 11 plays, 60 yards, 5:16; Stanford 24–23)

Statistics	ARIZ	STAN
First downs	16	21
Total yards	336	438
Rushing yards	23–77	48–286
Passing yards	259	152
Passing: Comp–Att–Int	22–34–0	16–24–2
Time of possession	25:25	34:35

Team	Category	Player	Statistics
Arizona	Passing	Willie Tuitama	22/34, 259 yards
Arizona	Rushing	Nic Grigsby	15 carries, 66 yards, TD
Arizona	Receiving	Terrell Turner	10 receptions, 175 yards
Stanford	Passing	Tavita Pritchard	13/17, 113 yards, TD, INT
Stanford	Rushing	Toby Gerhart	24 carries, 116 yards, TD
Stanford	Receiving	Ryan Whalen	5 receptions, 62 yards

=== vs No. 25 California ===
No. 25 California Golden Bears (4–1) vs Arizona Wildcats (4–2) – Game summary

Quarter	1	2	3	4	Total
No. 25 Golden Bears	7	17	3	0	27
Wildcats	0	14	28	0	42

at Arizona Stadium • Tucson, AZ

- Date: October 18, 2008
- Game time: 7:00 p.m.
- Game weather: Clear, warm, 84 °F (29 °C)
- Game attendance: 48,372
- Referee: Jack Folliard
- TV announcers (FSN Arizona): Dave Sitton (play-by-play), Lincoln Kennedy (analyst), Sean Mooney (sideline reporter)

Game information

First quarter

- (9:19) CAL – Verran Tucker 2-yard pass from Nate Longshore, Giorgio Tavecchio kick (Drive: 5 plays, 43 yards, 2:51; Arizona 7–0)

Second quarter

- (14:13) ARIZ – Keola Antolin 20-yard run, Jason Bondzio kick (Drive: 9 plays, 67 yards, 4:25; Tied 7–7)
- (12:35) ARIZ – Keola Antolin 11-yard run, Jason Bondzio kick (Drive: 2 plays, 47 yards, 0:29; Arizona 14–7)
- (7:51) CAL – Jahvid Best 67-yard run, Giorgio Tavecchio kick (Drive: 1 play, 67 yards, 0:13; Tied 14–14)
- (3:34) CAL – Cameron Morrah 18-yard pass from Nate Longshore, Giorgio Tavecchio kick (Drive: 6 plays, 59 yards, 3:37; California 21–14)
- (0:03) CAL – Giorgio Tavecchio 42-yard field goal (Drive: 5 plays, 21 yards, 0:25; California 24–14)

Third quarter

- (13:14) ARIZ – Mike Thomas 56-yard pass from Willie Tuitama, Jason Bondzio kick (Drive: 4 plays, 81 yards, 1:41; California 24–21)
- (9:20) CAL – Giorgio Tavecchio 40-yard field goal (Drive: 5 plays, 21 yards, 1:23; California 27–21)
- (6:33) ARIZ – Keola Antolin 1-yard run, Jason Bondzio kick (Drive: 7 plays, 77 yards, 2:42; Arizona 28–27)
- (6:16) ARIZ – Devin Ross 21-yard interception return, Jason Bondzio kick (Arizona 35–27)
- (1:29) ARIZ – Rob Gronkowski 35-yard pass from Willie Tuitama, Jason Bondzio kick (Drive: 6 plays, 59 yards, 3:04; Arizona 42–27)

Fourth quarter

- No scoring plays

Statistics	CAL	ARIZ
First downs	18	17
Total yards	425	404
Rushing yards	23–110	41–179
Passing yards	315	225
Passing: Comp–Att–Int	25–56–2	16–27–1
Time of possession	29:02	29:32

Team	Category	Player	Statistics
California	Passing	Nate Longshore	18/37, 218 yards, 2 TD, INT
California	Rushing	Jahvid Best	16 carries, 107 yards, TD
California	Receiving	Verran Tucker	4 receptions, 68 yards, TD
Arizona	Passing	Willie Tuitama	16/27, 225 yards, 2 TD, INT
Arizona	Rushing	Keola Antolin	21 carries, 149 yards, 3 TD
Arizona	Receiving	Mike Thomas	6 receptions, 104 yards, TD

=== vs No. 4 USC ===
No. 4 USC Trojans (5–1) vs Arizona Wildcats (5–2) – Game summary

Quarter	1	2	3	4	Total
No. 4 Trojans	3	7	7	0	17
Wildcats	0	3	7	0	10

at Arizona Stadium • Tucson, AZ

- Date: October 25, 2008
- Game time: 7:15 p.m.
- Game weather: Clear, 76 °F (24 °C)
- Game attendance: 57,427
- Referee: Jay Stricherz
- TV announcers (FSN): Barry Tompkins (play-by-play), Petros Papadakis (analyst), Jim Watson (sideline reporter)

Game information

First quarter

- (12:29) USC – David Buehler 43-yard field goal (Drive: 4 plays, 0 yards, 0:54; USC 3–0)

Second quarter

- (12:56) ARIZ – Jason Bondzio 30-yard field goal (Drive: 13 plays, 58 yards, 5:56; Tied 3–3)
- (5:03) USC – Stafon Johnson 2-yard run, David Buehler kick (Drive: 17 plays, 80 yards, 7:53; USC 10–3)

Third quarter

- (12:18) ARIZ – Nic Grigsby 5-yard run, Jason Bondzio kick (Drive: 4 plays, 15 yards, 1:46; Tied 10–10)
- (7:56) USC – Stanley Havili 30-yard pass from Mark Sanchez, David Buehler kick (Drive: 9 plays, 80 yards, 4:22; USC 17–10)

Fourth quarter

- No scoring plays

Statistics	USC	ARIZ
First downs	19	13
Total yards	367	188
Rushing yards	41–151	30–100
Passing yards	216	88
Passing: Comp–Att–Int	21–36–1	14–31–1
Time of possession	33:34	26:26

Team	Category	Player	Statistics
USC	Passing	Mark Sanchez	21/36, 216 yards, TD, INT
USC	Rushing	Stafon Johnson	19 carries, 83 yards, TD
USC	Receiving	Damian Williams	5 receptions, 77 yards
Arizona	Passing	Willie Tuitama	14/30, 88 yards, INT
Arizona	Rushing	Nic Grigsby	14 carries, 69 yards, TD
Arizona	Receiving	Mike Thomas	6 receptions, 45 yards

=== at Washington State ===
Arizona Wildcats (5–3) at Washington State Cougars (1–8) – Game summary

Quarter	1	2	3	4	Total
Wildcats	14	21	10	14	59
Cougars	7	7	7	7	28

at Martin Stadium • Pullman, WA

- Date: November 8, 2008
- Game time: 2:00 p.m.
- Game weather: Overcast, 50 °F (10 °C)
- Game attendance: 24,118
- Referee: Larry Farina

Game information

First quarter

- (10:10) WSU – Dwight Tardy 18-yard run, Wade Penner kick (Drive: 6 plays, 56 yards, 2:43; Washington State 7–0)
- (4:13) ARIZ – Mike Thomas 5-yard run, Jason Bondzio kick (Drive: 12 plays, 72 yards, 5:52; Tied 7–7)
- (0:52) ARIZ – Rob Gronkowski 43-yard pass from Willie Tuitama, Jason Bondzio kick (Drive: 4 plays, 73 yards, 1:53; Arizona 14–7)

Second quarter

- (14:53) WSU – Kevin Lopina 4-yard run, Wade Penner kick (Drive: 3 plays, 54 yards, 0:53; Tied 14–14)
- (10:20) ARIZ – Keola Antolin 5-yard run, Jason Bondzio kick (Drive: 9 plays, 81 yards, 4:31; Arizona 21–14)
- (2:47) ARIZ – Willie Tuitama 4-yard run, Jason Bondzio kick (Drive: 4 plays, 69 yards, 1:37; Arizona 28–14)
- (1:06) ARIZ – Nic Grigsby 6-yard run, Jason Bondzio kick (Drive: 3 plays, 29 yards, 1:22; Arizona 35–14)

Third quarter

- (12:36) ARIZ – Xavier Smith 6-yard run, Jason Bondzio kick (Drive: 5 plays, 80 yards, 2:24; Arizona 42–14)
- (9:22) WSU – Logwone Mitz 2-yard run, Wade Penner kick (Drive: 7 plays, 69 yards, 3:09; Arizona 42–21)
- (3:54) ARIZ – Jason Bondzio 40-yard field goal (Drive: 9 plays, 48 yards, 5:20; Arizona 45–21)

Fourth quarter

- (14:54) WSU – Kevin Lopina 6-yard run, Wade Penner kick (Drive: 7 plays, 28 yards, 2:20; Arizona 45–28)
- (7:03) ARIZ – Xavier Smith 4-yard run, Jason Bondzio kick (Drive: 13 plays, 67 yards, 7:46; Arizona 52–28)
- (4:35) ARIZ – Matt Scott 18-yard run, Alex Zendejas kick (Drive: 4 plays, 25 yards, 2:13; Arizona 59–28)

Statistics	ARIZ	WSU
First downs	28	12
Total yards	531	208
Rushing yards	57–317	29–94
Passing yards	214	114
Passing: Comp–Att–Int	11–15–1	10–20–3
Time of possession	37:27	22:33

Team	Category	Player	Statistics
Arizona	Passing	Willie Tuitama	11/15, 214 yards, TD, INT
Arizona	Rushing	Nic Grigsby	28 carries, 197 yards, TD
Arizona	Receiving	Rob Gronkowski	4 receptions, 83 yards, TD
Washington State	Passing	Kevin Lopina	8/15, 94 yards, 2 INT
Washington State	Rushing	Logwone Mitz	11 carries, 57 yards, TD
Washington State	Receiving	Ben Woodard	2 receptions, 49 yards

Washington State scored first – taking its first lead of the season in a Pac-10 game – when Dwight Tardy took a pitch from QB Kevin Lopina and ran 18 yards with 10:10 left in the first. Arizona replied with a 12-play drive and WR Mike Thomas ran 5 yards for a touchdown to tie the game. Arizona TE Rob Gronkowski caught a short pass from QB Willie Tuitama and ran 43 yards for a touchdown to put Arizona up 14–7 at the end of the first quarter. After getting the ball on their own 46 to start the next drive, WSU's Logwone Mitz tore off runs of 8 and 42 yards to take the ball to Arizona's 4. Lopina ran it in to tie the score at 14. Arizona replied with an 81-yard drive with RB Keola Antolin running 5 yards up the middle for a 21–14 lead with 10:20 left in the half. The WSU offense stalled the rest of the half. Meanwhile, Tuitama ran in from the 4 on a broken play for a 28–14 Arizona advantage. Arizona's Devin Ross intercepted Lopina on the next series, and RB Nic Grigsby ran it three times, the last for a 6-yard touchdown and a 35–14 halftime lead. Wildcat RB Xavier Smith scored on a 6-yard run on the opening drive of the second half for a 42–14 lead. Mitz scored from 3 yards out on the next series to bring WSU to within 42–21. Arizona would go on to beat Washington State by a final score of 59–28 for win number 6, making the Wildcats eligible for their first bowl game since 1998.

=== at Oregon ===
Arizona Wildcats (6–3) at Oregon Ducks (7–3) – Game summary

Quarter	1	2	3	4	Total
Wildcats	10	7	7	21	45
Ducks	21	24	3	7	55

at Autzen Stadium • Eugene, OR

- Date: November 15, 2008
- Game time: 2:00 p.m.
- Game weather: Light Overcast, 52 °F (11 °C)
- Game attendance: 58,369
- Referee: Michael Batlan
- TV announcers (FSN Arizona): Dave Sitton (play-by-play), Lincoln Kennedy (analyst)

Game information

First quarter

- (14:18) ORE – Jeremiah Masoli 66-yard run, Morgan Flint kick (Drive: 3 plays, 85 yards, 0:42; Oregon 7–0)
- (13:28) ORE – Patrick Chung 31-yard interception return, Morgan Flint kick (Oregon 14–7)
- (8:58) ARIZ – Jason Bondzio 29-yard field goal (Drive: 12 plays, 62 yards, 4:30; Oregon 14–3)
- (2:16) ARIZ – Keola Antolin 2-yard run, Jason Bondzio kick (Drive: 9 plays, 37 yards, 4:41; Oregon 14–10)
- (0:25) ORE – Terence Scott 44-yard pass from Jeremiah Masoli, Morgan Flint kick (Drive: 7 plays, 71 yards, 1:51; Oregon 21–10)

Second quarter

- (11:46) ORE – Jeremiah Masoli 5-yard run, Morgan Flint kick (Drive: 6 plays, 34 yards, 1:42; Oregon 28–10)
- (9:34) ARIZ – Chris Gronkowski 37-yard pass from Willie Tuitama, Jason Bondzio kick (Drive: 6 plays, 72 yards, 2:12; Oregon 28–17)
- (7:34) ORE – Jeremiah Masoli 6-yard run, Morgan Flint kick (Drive: 7 plays, 73 yards, 2:12; Oregon 35–17)
- (3:28) ORE – Jeff Maehl 65-yard pass from Jeremiah Masoli, Morgan Flint kick (Drive: 3 plays, 88 yards, 0:59; Oregon 42–17)
- (0:00) ORE – Morgan Flint 23-yard field goal (Drive: 7 plays, 49 yards, 0:44; Oregon 45–17)

Third quarter

- (12:46) ORE – Morgan Flint 39-yard field goal (Drive: 5 plays, 27 yards, 0:58; Oregon 48–17)
- (8:53) ARIZ – Rob Gronkowski 7-yard pass from Willie Tuitama, Jason Bondzio kick (Drive: 8 plays, 66 yards, 3:53; Oregon 48–24)

Fourth quarter

- (14:56) ARIZ – Keola Antolin 3-yard run, Willie Tuitama two-point pass to Rob Gronkowski (Drive: 9 plays, 80 yards, 3:51; Oregon 48–32)
- (8:55) ARIZ – Keola Antolin 1-yard run, two-point run failed (Drive: 9 plays, 77 yards, 4:48; Oregon 48–38)
- (6:38) ARIZ – Keola Antolin 13-yard run, Jason Bondzio kick (Drive: 5 plays, 33 yards, 2:03; Oregon 48–45)
- (3:38) ORE – LaGarrette Blount 40-yard run, Morgan Flint kick (Drive: 2 plays, 45 yards, 0:12; Oregon 55–45)

Statistics	ARIZ	ORE
First downs	30	18
Total yards	527	504
Rushing yards	52–199	30–206
Passing yards	328	298
Passing: Comp–Att–Int	29–46–2	21–27–0
Time of possession	41:46	18:14

Team	Category	Player	Statistics
Arizona	Passing	Willie Tuitama	29/45, 328 yards, 2 TD, 2 INT
Arizona	Rushing	Keola Antolin	20 carries, 87 yards, 4 TD
Arizona	Receiving	Rob Gronkowski	12 receptions, 143 yards, TD
Oregon	Passing	Jeremiah Masoli	21/26, 298 yards, 2 TD
Oregon	Rushing	Jeremiah Masoli	10 carries, 89 yards, 3 TD
Oregon	Receiving	Terence Scott	6 receptions, 87 yards, TD

The Oregon Ducks started hot against the Arizona Wildcats in Eugene, with Jeremiah Masoli getting a career-high in rushing touchdowns (3) and broke the record for an Oregon quarterback in this category in a single Ducks game. He also had two passing touchdowns, all five in the first half. Oregon led at the half, 45–17, but Arizona started the second half hot. The Wildcats managed to hold the Ducks to merely ten points in the second half, while they had a 21-point fourth quarter to pull within three. However, a 40-yard touchdown hit from Masoli to LeGarrette Blounte sealed the Ducks win, 55–45, to avenge a loss to the Wildcats from last year. This game was the first in which the Ducks wore their new "blackout" jerseys and black helmets, to fit with the Autzen Stadium "blackout" theme for the game.

=== vs No. 21 Oregon State ===
No. 21 Oregon State Beavers (7–3) vs Arizona Wildcats (6–4) – Game summary

Quarter	1	2	3	4	Total
No. 21 Beavers	0	3	7	9	19
Wildcats	0	3	7	7	17

at Arizona Stadium • Tucson, AZ

- Date: November 22, 2008
- Game time: 4:00 p.m.
- Game weather: Mostly clear, 74 °F (23 °C)
- Game attendance: 48,503
- Referee: Jack Folliard
- TV announcers (Versus): Ron Thulin (play-by-play), Kelly Stouffer (analyst), Lewis Johnson (sideline reporter)

Game information

First quarter

- No scoring plays

Second quarter

- (8:17) ARIZ – Jason Bondzio 27-yard field goal (Drive: 16 plays, 72 yards, 7:44; Arizona 3–0)
- (0:00) OSU – Justin Kahut 47-yard field goal (Drive: 8 plays, 52 yards, 3:19; Tied 3–3)

Third quarter

- (9:06) OSU – James Rodgers 7-yard run, Justin Kahut kick (Drive: 8 plays, 61 yards, 3:31; Oregon State 10–3)
- (0:16) ARIZ – Rob Gronkowski 16-yard pass from Willie Tuitama, Jason Bondzio kick (Drive: 13 plays, 76 yards, 6:31; Tied 10–10)

Fourth quarter

- (8:26) ARIZ – Keola Antolin 9-yard run, Jason Bondzio kick (Drive: 8 plays, 50 yards, 3:26; Arizona 17–10)
- (3:58) OSU – Sammie Stroughter 7-yard pass from Sean Canfield, kick failed (Drive: 10 plays, 80 yards, 4:28; Arizona 17–16)
- (0:00) OSU – Justin Kahut 24-yard field goal (Drive: 7 plays, 73 yards, 1:19; Oregon State 19–17)

Statistics	OSU	ARIZ
First downs	17	19
Total yards	390	297
Rushing yards	33–166	41–139
Passing yards	224	158
Passing: Comp–Att–Int	20–32–0	16–22–0
Time of possession	27:17	32:43

Team	Category	Player	Statistics
Oregon State	Passing	Sean Canfield	20/32, 224 yards, TD
Oregon State	Rushing	James Rodgers	10 carries, 102 yards, TD
Oregon State	Receiving	Sammie Stroughter	5 receptions, 116 yards, TD
Arizona	Passing	Willie Tuitama	16/22, 158 yards, TD
Arizona	Rushing	Keola Antolin	25 carries, 114 yards, TD
Arizona	Receiving	Mike Thomas	6 receptions, 50 yards

Before an enthusiastic crowd of 48,503 at Arizona Stadium, Oregon State had to go without starting quarterback Lyle Moevao, sidelined by a shoulder injury. Then they lost tailback Jacquizz Rodgers, the Pac-10's leading rusher and Pac-10 Player of the Year candidate, to a shoulder injury on their second possession. With the score tied at 10–10 early in the fourth quarter (on a 16-yard touchdown pass to Arizona TE Rob Gronkowski with 16 seconds left in the third quarter), Oregon State head coach Mike Riley went for it twice on fourth down near midfield. The first one worked and the second did not, and it proved costly. After backup tailback Ryan McCants lost a yard on fourth-and-1 at Arizona's 49, the Wildcats went on an eight-play march capped by a 9-yard touchdown run by RB Keola Antolin to give Arizona a 17–10 lead. Oregon State responded with a 10-play, 80-yard drive for a touchdown. Then, Beavers kicker Justin Kahut missed the extra point with 3:58 left, seemingly giving Arizona the chance for the win. Arizona's offense stalled, and while the Wildcats led 17–16 with 1:19 to play, Oregon State took over at their own 20 with no timeouts left. Oregon State quarterback Sean Canfield, who started in place of Moevao, hit Jeremy Francis for a 20-yard catch to the 40. A seven-yard run by receiver James Rodgers went to the 47. On the third play of the drive, Canfield found Sammie Stroughter alone behind the Wildcats secondary for a 47-yard gain to the Arizona 7. Then, Kahut calmly nailed a 24-yard field goal as time expired to seal an improbable 19–17 victory, redeeming himself and leaving the Beavers one win away from their first Rose Bowl trip since 1965. Keola Antolin rushed for 114 yards and a touchdown for Arizona, while Arizona QB Willie Tuitama threw for 158 yards and a score.

=== vs Arizona State ===
Arizona State Sun Devils (5–6) vs Arizona Wildcats (6–5) – Game summary

Quarter	1	2	3	4	Total
Sun Devils	0	10	0	0	10
Wildcats	7	0	21	3	31

at Arizona Stadium • Tucson, AZ

- Date: December 6, 2008
- Game time: 6:00 p.m.
- Game weather: Mostly clear, 65 °F (18 °C)
- Game attendance: 58,704
- Referee: Jack Wood
- TV announcers (ESPN): Mark Jones (play-by-play), Bob Davie (analyst)

Game information

First quarter

- (0:31) ARIZ – Rob Gronkowski 17-yard pass from Willie Tuitama, Jason Bondzio kick (Drive: 12 plays, 98 yards, 5:44; Arizona 7–0)

Second quarter

- (10:58) ASU – Thomas Weber 40-yard field goal (Drive: 9 plays, 29 yards, 4:25; Arizona 7–3)
- (5:53) ASU – Andrew Pettes 2-yard pass from Rudy Carpenter, Thomas Weber kick (Drive: 5 plays, 19 yards, 2:09; Arizona State 10–7)

Third quarter

- (7:23) ARIZ – Delashaun Dean 10-yard pass from Willie Tuitama, Jason Bondzio kick (Drive: 11 plays, 70 yards, 5:52; Arizona 14–10)
- (4:24) ARIZ – Nic Grigsby 12-yard run, Jason Bondzio kick (Drive: 4 plays, 34 yards, 1:29; Arizona 21–10)
- (2:22) ARIZ – Mike Thomas 52-yard punt return, Jason Bondzio kick (Arizona 28–10)

Fourth quarter

- (12:34) ARIZ – Jason Bondzio 49-yard field goal (Drive: 6 plays, 48 yards, 2:13; Arizona 31–10)

Statistics	ASU	ARIZ
First downs	12	25
Total yards	162	389
Rushing yards	23–38	40–105
Passing yards	124	284
Passing: Comp–Att–Int	13–31–1	25–37–1
Time of possession	23:10	36:50

Team	Category	Player	Statistics
Arizona State	Passing	Rudy Carpenter	13/31, 124 yards, TD, INT
Arizona State	Rushing	Keegan Herring	14 carries, 31 yards
Arizona State	Receiving	Kyle Williams	5 receptions, 116 yards
Arizona	Passing	Willie Tuitama	25/37, 284 yards, 2 TD, INT
Arizona	Rushing	Nic Grigsby	22 carries, 114 yards, TD
Arizona	Receiving	Rob Gronkowski	6 receptions, 95 yards, TD

The Wildcats were not just playing for in-state bragging rights this year in their 82nd meeting for the Territorial Cup. The Las Vegas Bowl announced on December 5 that the winner of this game would be extended an invitation to appear.

A sellout crowd of 58,704 (sixth-largest in Arizona Stadium history) was on hand; they had to suffer through a first half in which both teams struggled to find a rhythm offensively. The Wildcats scored first, 7–0 with 5:44 left in the first quarter, on a 17-yard pass from QB Willie Tuitama to TE Rob Gronkowski. On the drive, the Wildcats marched 98 yards in 12 plays – their longest scoring drive of the season.

Arizona State cut the Wildcat lead to 7–3 on a 40-yard field goal by Thomas Weber.

UA punter Keenyn Crier was ruled down on his right knee while trying to retrieve a low snap in the second quarter, giving the Sun Devils possession on the Wildcat 19 and setting up an easy two-play drive from QB Rudy Carpenter as he eventually hit WR Andrew Pettes for a 2-yard pass for a go-ahead Arizona State touchdown, making the score 10–7.

The 'Cats would fight back, and scored on their first offensive possession of the second half, as Tuitama led the Wildcats on an 11-play, 70-yard scoring drive. He connected with WR Delashaun Dean on a 10-yard slant route for the score. Kicker Jason Bondzio's PAT gave the Cats a 14–10 lead.

Arizona would score again after a 47-yard Marquis Hundley interception of a Rudy Carpenter pass led to a 12-yard scoring run by UA tailback Nic Grigsby. The Wildcats scored again on a dramatic 52-yard punt return from WR Mike Thomas, to quickly transform a 10–7 halftime deficit into a 28–10 lead.

Jason Bondzio kicked a 49-yard field goal for a 31–10 lead with 12:34 to go in the game.

Grigsby finished with 114 rushing yards on 22 carries. Tuitama completed 25 of 37 passes for 284 yards and two touchdowns. TE Rob Gronkowski led the team with six catches for 95 yards. WR Mike Thomas finished with nine catches for 75 yards and was selected the game MVP.

Arizona State, with the Wildcat win, ends their relatively disappointing season at 5–7, and as such is kept from being invited to a bowl game for the first time since 2003.

=== vs No. 17 BYU (Las Vegas Bowl) ===
Arizona Wildcats (7–5) vs No. 17 BYU Cougars (10–2) – Game summary
(2008 Pioneer Las Vegas Bowl)

Quarter	1	2	3	4	Total
Wildcats	7	3	14	7	31
No. 17 Cougars	0	7	7	7	21

at Sam Boyd Stadium • Whitney, NV

- Date: December 20, 2008
- Game time: 6:00 p.m.
- Game weather: Partly cloudy and cold, 44 °F (7 °C)
- Game attendance: 40,047
- Referee: Jeff Flanagan
- TV announcers (ESPN): Mike Patrick (play-by-play), Todd Blackledge (analyst), Holly Rowe (sideline reporter)

Game information

First quarter

- (6:23) ARIZ – Nic Grigsby 1-yard run, Jason Bondzio kick (Drive: 8 plays, 96 yards, 3:21; Arizona 7–0)

Second quarter

- (9:21) ARIZ – Jason Bondzio 31-yard field goal (Drive: 4 plays, 9 yards, 0:28; Arizona 10–0)
- (6:50) BYU – Harvey Unga 1-yard run, Mitch Payne kick (Drive: 6 plays, 78 yards, 2:24; Arizona 10–7)

Third quarter

- (11:21) BYU – Andrew George 1-yard pass from Max Hall, Mitch Payne kick (Drive: 6 plays, 27 yards, 3:24; BYU 14–10)
- (7:07) ARIZ – Delashaun Dean 37-yard pass from Willie Tuitama, Jason Bondzio kick (Drive: 2 plays, 40 yards, 0:46; Arizona 17–14)
- (0:25) ARIZ – Chris Gronkowski 24-yard pass from Willie Tuitama, Jason Bondzio kick (Drive: 5 plays, 65 yards, 1:48; Arizona 24–14)

Fourth quarter

- (6:09) ARIZ – Willie Tuitama 6-yard run, Jason Bondzio kick (Drive: 7 plays, 82 yards, 3:54; Arizona 31–14)
- (3:38) BYU – Max Hall 1-yard run, Mitch Payne kick (Drive: 10 plays, 68 yards, 2:25; Arizona 31–21)

Statistics	ARIZ	BYU
First downs	20	22
Total yards	416	444
Rushing yards	28–91	32–116
Passing yards	325	328
Passing: Comp–Att–Int	24–35–0	30–46–1
Time of possession	27:12	32:48

Team	Category	Player	Statistics
Arizona	Passing	Willie Tuitama	24/35, 325 yards, 2 TD
Arizona	Rushing	Nic Grigsby	20 carries, 87 yards, TD
Arizona	Receiving	Terrell Turner	4 receptions, 111 yards
BYU	Passing	Max Hall	30/46, 328 yards, TD, INT
BYU	Rushing	Harvey Unga	17 carries, 71 yards, TD
BYU	Receiving	Austin Collie	11 receptions, 119 yards

Arizona quarterback Willie Tuitama was named MVP.

Willie Tuitama threw for 322 yards and two touchdowns as Arizona won its first bowl game in 10 years in front of a crowd of 40,047 at Sam Boyd Stadium in Las Vegas.

The Wildcats stifled BYU quarterback Max Hall throughout the game, forcing him to scramble often, lose a fumble and throw an interception. Arizona (8–5) kept the ball in the air most of the game. Tuitama threw a 71-yard pass to WR Terrell Turner that set up the first score, a 37-yard touchdown to WR Delashaun Dean that gave the Wildcats the lead for good in the third quarter, and a 24-yard strike to RB Chris Gronkowski that sent Cougars fans toward the exits (Tuitama would run 6 yards into the end zone to complete the drive). The Wildcats' third-quarter scoring spree salvaged an otherwise-unlucky period. Arizona thought it had recovered a fumble three plays earlier, when BYU WR Austin Collie caught a screen pass, took a step, ran into his own blocker and fumbled. UA safety Nate Ness recovered at BYU's 11. The game's referee crew opted to review the play, and ruled that Collie had never demonstrated possession. The Cougars completed a short pass on third down, then punted. Arizona's five days in Las Vegas had a little bit of everything — fun, drama and even questions about Mike Stoops' job future (Stoops was rumored to be a candidate for the vacant Iowa State head coach position which was filled by Auburn assistant coach Paul Rhoads).

== Awards ==
Willie Tuitama (QB)

- All-Pacific-10 (2nd team)
- Las Vegas Bowl MVP

Mike Thomas (WR/Return Specialist)

- All-Pacific-10 (1st team)

Rob Gronkowski (TE)

- All-Pacific-10 (1st team)

Eben Britton (OL)

- All-Pacific-10 (1st team)

Joe Longacre (OL)

- All-Pacific-10 (2nd team)

Devin Ross (CB)

- All-Pacific-10 (2nd team)

Jason Bondzio (K)

- All-Pacific-10 (2nd team)
