= Las Vegas Bowl =

Annual American college football postseason game

- Stadium: Allegiant Stadium
- Location: Paradise, Nevada
- Previous stadiums: Sam Boyd Stadium (1992–2019)
- Previous locations: Whitney, Nevada (1992–2019)
- Operated: 1992–present
- Previous conference tie-ins: Big West (1992–1996); MAC (1992–1996); WAC (1997–1998); MWC (2001–2019); SEC (2022 and 2024); Big Ten (2023 and 2025–present); Pac-12 (2024–present)
- Payout: US$2.9 million (2019)
- Website: lvbowl.com

Sponsors
- Reno Air (1997); Las Vegas Convention & Visitors Authority (1998, 2000, 2003); EA Sports (1999) Sega/Sega Sports (2001–2002); Pioneer (2004–2008) Maaco (2009–2012); Royal Purple (2013–2015); GEICO (2016); Mitsubishi (2018–2019); SRS Distribution (2021–2025)

Former names
- Las Vegas Bowl (1992–1996, 1998); Las Vegas Bowl presented by Reno Air (1997); EA Sports Las Vegas Bowl (1999); Las Vegas Bowl (2000); Sega Sports Las Vegas Bowl (2001–2002); Las Vegas Bowl (2003); Pioneer Purevision Las Vegas Bowl (2004–2006); Pioneer Las Vegas Bowl (2007–2008); Maaco Bowl Las Vegas (2009–2012); Royal Purple Las Vegas Bowl (2013–2015); Las Vegas Bowl presented by GEICO (2016); Las Vegas Bowl (2017); Mitsubishi Las Vegas Bowl (2018–2019); SRS Distribution Las Vegas Bowl (2021–2025)

2025 matchup
- Nebraska vs. Utah (Utah 44–22)

The Las Vegas Bowl is an NCAA Division I FBS annual post-season college football bowl game held in the Las Vegas Valley. First played in 1992, the bowl was originally held at the 40,000-seat Sam Boyd Stadium in Whitney, Nevada, before moving to the 65,000-seat Allegiant Stadium in Paradise, Nevada, in 2021. The bowl is owned and operated by ESPN Events.

== Conference tie-ins ==
Because the Las Vegas Bowl was effectively the replacement for the California Bowl, it inherited that bowl's tie-ins with the champions of the Big West Conference and the Mid-American Conference. These remained intact until 1996, after which the Big West's champion earned a berth in the Humanitarian Bowl while the MAC's champion was given a berth in the Motor City Bowl. 1997 through 1999 saw a team from the Western Athletic Conference face an at-large team, and the Mountain West Conference took over for the WAC for the 1999 and 2000 games (the 1999 game featured both WAC and Mountain West teams). Beginning in 2001, the Mountain West and Pac-12 Conferences (originally known as the Pacific-10 Conference) matched up in Las Vegas.

From 2001 until 2005, the second-place team in the Mountain West was chosen to face the Pac-12. Beginning in 2006, after its contract with the Liberty Bowl expired, the Mountain West agreed to send its champion to the Las Vegas Bowl to face the Pac-12's 5th or 6th-place team. From 2006 until 2013, the Mountain West would send a secondary team if the champion qualified for the Bowl Championship Series or, as per the rules of the Hawaiʻi Bowl, was Hawaiʻi. The 2016 game would have pitted the Pac-12's #6 team against the winner of the Mountain West Conference Football Championship Game, provided that the winner of the game does not automatically qualify for one of the College Football Playoff's six bowls as the highest-ranking member of the "Group of Five" (champions of the Mountain West, Sun Belt, American, or Mid-American Conferences, as well as the Conference USA champion comprise this group). However, since the Pac-12 only had six bowl-eligible teams and two of them qualified for New Years Six bowls, the bowl elected to invite the Houston Cougars of the American Athletic Conference instead of a Pac-12 team.

To heighten the profile of the game with its move to Allegiant Stadium, the Las Vegas Bowl announced a new, five-year, alternating tie-in between the SEC and Big Ten beginning 2020. An SEC team will play the Las Vegas Bowl in even-numbered years, while a Big Ten team will play in odd-numbered years. The conference not playing in the Las Vegas Bowl will play in the Duke's Mayo Bowl (formerly Belk Bowl). The Mountain West moved its top selection from the Las Vegas Bowl to the newly-established LA Bowl.

Even though 10 of the current Pac-12 teams departed for other conferences, the Pac-12 or Pac-12 "legacy teams" (the 10 schools leaving for the Big Ten, Big 12 and ACC) are still contractually obligated to fulfill their previous Pac-12 bowl tie-ins through the 2025 season.

== History ==
=== 20th century ===
The game originated from the California Raisin Bowl, which was played in Fresno from 1981 to 1991. In 1992, Fresno State, formerly of the Big West, moved to the Western Athletic Conference. The Big West and MAC then pulled out of Fresno and sought a new home for their conference champions. They found it in Las Vegas, where organizers were looking for a way to boost hotel revenue. In those days, the Christmas season was a slow period for Las Vegas hotels and casinos. The first Las Vegas Bowl was played in 1992.

The NCAA adopted an overtime rule for the 1995 post-season and all games thereafter. In 1995, Toledo defeated Nevada, 40–37, in the first ever overtime game in Division I-A college football. The following season, the policy of overtime was adopted for regular season games to break ties.

=== 21st century ===
In 2001, ESPN Regional Television purchased the Las Vegas Bowl from the Las Vegas Convention and Visitors Authority.

On December 25, 2002, UCLA interim coach Ed Kezirian was victorious in his only game as the UCLA head coach as UCLA won 27–13 over New Mexico. In that game, New Mexico sent Katie Hnida in to kick an extra point which was the first time a woman played in a Division I Football Bowl Subdivision (née Division I-A) college football game. The kick was blocked.

The 2007 Las Vegas Bowl featured a rematch between Mountain West Champion BYU and UCLA who defeated BYU during the regular season. UCLA scored first on a field goal after a fumble by BYU quarterback Max Hall. BYU answered with a touchdown reception by Austin Collie. BYU went up 17–6 with Michael Reed catch for a touchdown. A fumble by BYU with 19 seconds left in the first half allowed UCLA to score and cut the lead to 17–13. UCLA cut the deficit to 17–16 on a 50-yard field goal. With two minutes left UCLA took over at their own two-yard line. They were able to drive down to the BYU 13-yard line with 3 seconds left. The 28-yard field goal attempt was partially blocked by BYU defensive tackle Eathyn Manumaleuna and fell short giving BYU their second Vegas Bowl victory in three tries, also making the Cougars the first school to win back-to-back Las Vegas Bowls. The following year, though, the Arizona Wildcats denied BYU their third consecutive Las Vegas Bowl win by winning 31–21.

On September 25, 2013, Royal Purple was announced as the new title sponsor for the next three years. Following the expiration of Royal Purple's sponsorship of the title from 2013 to 2015, the game became officially known as the Las Vegas Bowl.

With the relocation of the Oakland Raiders to the Las Vegas area, Allegiant Stadium was constructed to replace Sam Boyd Stadium. The Las Vegas Bowl along with the other events held at Sam Boyd Stadium moved to the new stadium upon completion.

On December 2, 2020, the 2020 edition of the game was cancelled due to the COVID-19 pandemic. Its tie-ins (SEC and Pac-12) were transferred to the ESPN Events-owned Armed Forces Bowl in Fort Worth, Texas.

== Sponsors ==
The bowl was known as the SEGA Sports Las Vegas Bowl from 2001 to 2002. From 2003 to 2008, the title sponsor was the Pioneer Corporation. From 2009 to 2012, the game was known as the Maaco Bowl Las Vegas, as the sponsor was MAACO. From 2013 to 2015, the game was known as the Royal Purple Las Vegas Bowl as the sponsor was Royal Purple. For the 2016 edition, the game was known as the Las Vegas Bowl presented by GEICO as GEICO was the presenting sponsor. On July 12, 2018, it was announced that Mitsubishi would be the new title sponsor, with the game renamed as the Mitsubishi Motors Las Vegas Bowl as part of a two-year deal. On April 20, 2021, SRS Distribution signed a five-year agreement with ESPN to become the title sponsor, making the game the SRS Distribution Las Vegas Bowl. The sponsorship expired after the 2025 game, so the game has reverted to the Las Vegas Bowl name pending new sponsorship.

== Game results ==
Rankings per AP poll prior to the game being played.

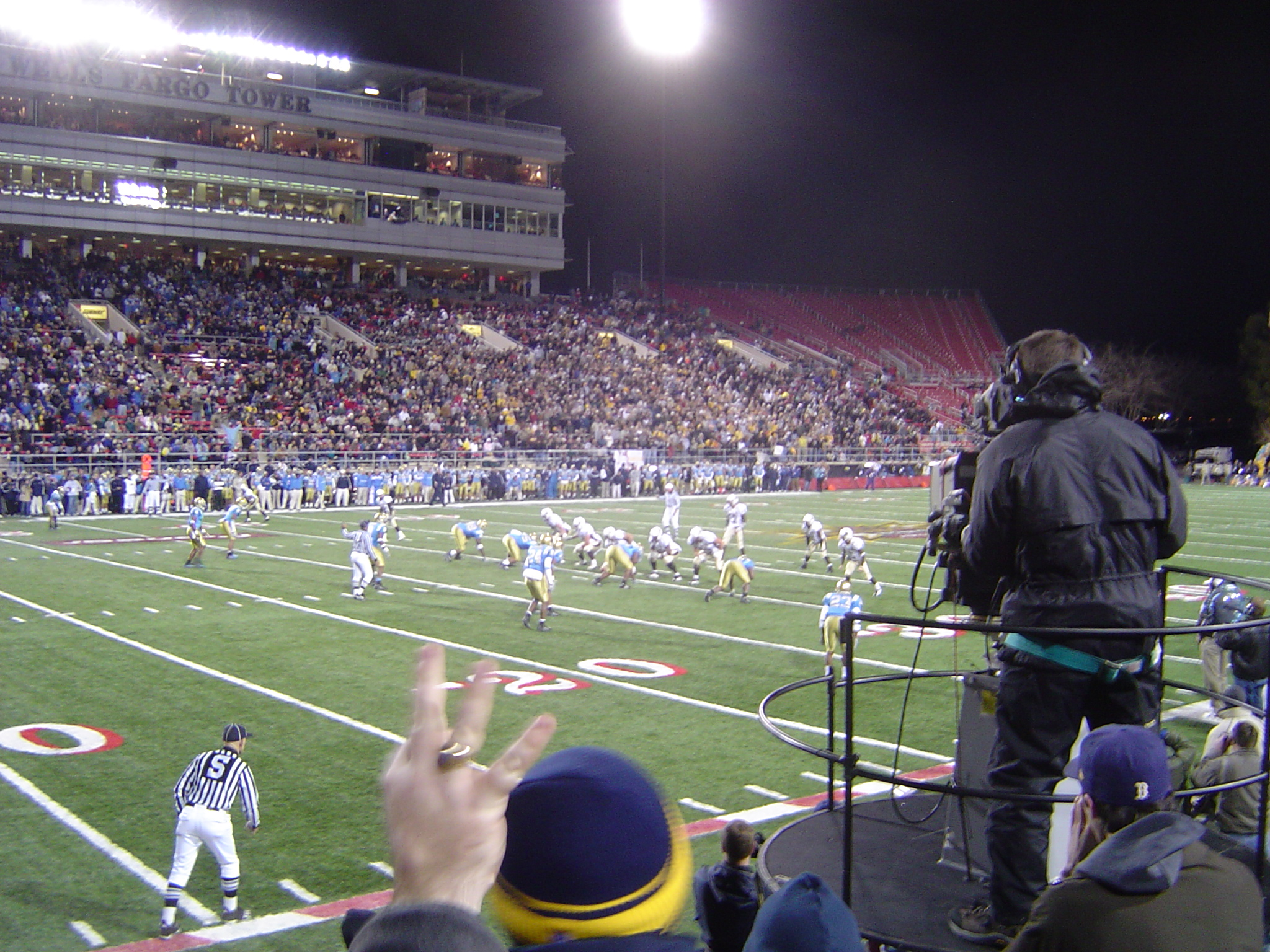
UCLA vs. Wyoming in 2004

Date	Winning team		Losing team		Attendance	Notes
December 18, 1992	Bowling Green	35	Nevada	34	15,476	notes
December 17, 1993	Utah State	42	Ball State	33	15,508	notes
December 15, 1994	UNLV	52	Central Michigan	24	17,562	notes
December 14, 1995	No. 25 Toledo	40	Nevada	37 (OT)	12,500	notes
December 18, 1996	Nevada	18	Ball State	15	10,118	notes
December 20, 1997	Oregon	41	No. 23 Air Force	13	21,514	notes
December 19, 1998	North Carolina	20	San Diego State	13	21,429	notes
December 18, 1999	Utah	17	Fresno State	16	28,227	notes
December 21, 2000	UNLV	31	Arkansas	14	29,113	notes
December 25, 2001	Utah	10	USC	6	30,894	notes
December 25, 2002	UCLA	27	New Mexico	13	30,324	notes
December 24, 2003	Oregon State	55	New Mexico	14	25,437	notes
December 23, 2004	Wyoming	24	UCLA	21	27,784	notes
December 22, 2005	California	35	BYU	28	40,053	notes
December 21, 2006	No. 19 BYU	38	Oregon	8	44,615	notes
December 22, 2007	No. 19 BYU	17	UCLA	16	40,712	notes
December 20, 2008	Arizona	31	No. 17 BYU	21	40,047	notes
December 22, 2009	No. 15 BYU	44	No. 16 Oregon State	20	40,018	notes
December 22, 2010	No. 10 Boise State	26	No. 20 Utah	3	41,923	notes
December 22, 2011	No. 8 Boise State	56	Arizona State	24	35,720	notes
December 22, 2012	No. 20 Boise State	28	Washington	26	33,217	notes
December 21, 2013	USC	45	No. 21 Fresno State	20	42,178	notes
December 20, 2014	No. 23 Utah	45	Colorado State	10	33,067	notes
December 19, 2015	No. 20 Utah	35	BYU	28	42,213	notes
December 17, 2016	San Diego State	34	Houston	10	29,286	notes
December 16, 2017	No. 25 Boise State	38	Oregon	28	36,432	notes
December 15, 2018	No. 19 Fresno State	31	Arizona State	20	37,146	notes
December 21, 2019	Washington	38	No. 18 Boise State	7	34,197	notes
2020	Canceled due to the COVID-19 pandemic				—	
December 30, 2021	Wisconsin	20	Arizona State	13	32,515	notes
December 17, 2022	No. 17 Oregon State	30	Florida	3	29,750	notes
December 23, 2023	Northwestern	14	Utah	7	20,897	notes
December 27, 2024	USC	35	Texas A&M	31	26,671	notes
December 31, 2025	No. 15 Utah	44	Nebraska	22	38,879	notes

== MVPs ==
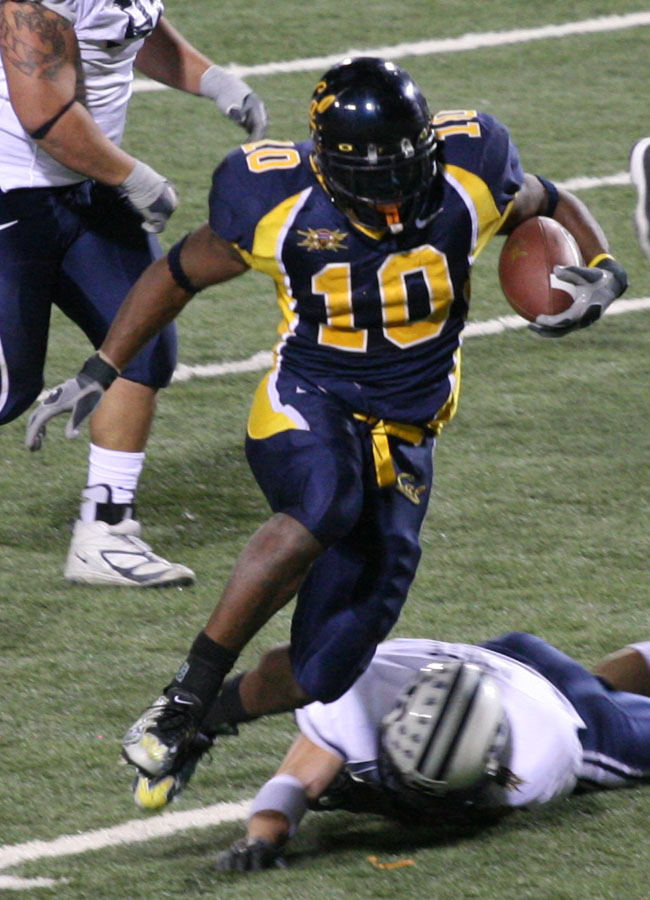
Game MVP Marshawn Lynch at the 2005 Las Vegas Bowl.

Date	MVP	Team	Position
December 18, 1992	Erik White	Bowling Green	QB
December 17, 1993	Anthony Calvillo	Utah State	QB
December 15, 1994	Henry Bailey	UNLV	WR
December 14, 1995	Wasean Tait	Toledo	RB
December 18, 1996	Mike Crawford	Nevada	LB
December 20, 1997	Pat Johnson	Oregon	WR
December 19, 1998	Ronald Curry	North Carolina	QB
December 18, 1999	Mike Anderson	Utah	RB
December 21, 2000	Jason Thomas	UNLV	QB
December 25, 2001	Dameon Hunter	Utah	RB
December 25, 2002	Craig Bragg	UCLA	WR
December 24, 2003	Steven Jackson	Oregon State	RB
December 23, 2004	Corey Bramlet	Wyoming	QB
December 22, 2005	Marshawn Lynch	California	RB
December 21, 2006	Jonny Harline	BYU	TE
December 22, 2007	Austin Collie	BYU	WR
December 20, 2008	Willie Tuitama	Arizona	QB
December 22, 2009	Max Hall	BYU	QB
December 22, 2010	Kellen Moore	Boise State	QB
December 22, 2011	Doug Martin	Boise State	RB
December 22, 2012	Bishop Sankey	Washington	RB
December 21, 2013	Cody Kessler	USC	QB
December 20, 2014	Travis Wilson	Utah	QB
December 19, 2015	Tevin Carter	Utah	CB
December 17, 2016	Donnel Pumphrey	San Diego State	RB
December 16, 2017	Cedrick Wilson Jr.	Boise State	WR
December 15, 2018	Ronnie Rivers	Fresno State	RB
December 21, 2019	Elijah Molden	Washington	DB
December 30, 2021	Braelon Allen	Wisconsin	RB
December 17, 2022	Ben Gulbranson	Oregon State	QB
December 23, 2023	Ben Bryant	Northwestern	QB
December 27, 2024	Ja'Kobi Lane	USC	WR
December 31, 2025	Devon Dampier	Utah	QB

== Most appearances ==
Updated through the December 2025 edition (33 games, 66 total appearances).

Teams with multiple appearances

Rank	Team	Appearances	Record
1	Utah	7	5–2
2	BYU	6	3–3
3	Boise State	5	4–1
4	Oregon State	3	2–1
4	USC	3	2–1
4	Fresno State	3	1–2
4	Nevada	3	1–2
4	Oregon	3	1–2
4	UCLA	3	1–2
4	Arizona State	3	0–3
11	UNLV	2	2–0
11	San Diego State	2	1–1
11	Washington	2	1–1
11	Ball State	2	0–2
11	New Mexico	2	0–2

Teams with a single appearance

Won (9): Arizona, Bowling Green, California, North Carolina, Northwestern, Toledo, Utah State, Wisconsin, Wyoming
Lost (8): Air Force, Arkansas, Central Michigan, Colorado State, Florida, Houston, Nebraska, Texas A&M

== Appearances by conference ==
Updated through the December 2025 edition (33 games, 66 total appearances).

Conference	Record				Appearances by season	
Conference	Games	W	L	Win pct.	Won	Lost
Pac-12	21	10	11	.476	1997, 2002, 2003, 2005, 2008, 2013, 2014, 2015, 2019, 2022	2001, 2004, 2006, 2007, 2009, 2011, 2012, 2017, 2018, 2021, 2023
Mountain West	20	12	8	.600	1999, 2000, 2001, 2004, 2006, 2007, 2009, 2011, 2012, 2016, 2017, 2018	2002, 2003, 2005, 2008, 2010, 2013, 2014, 2019
Big West	5	3	2	.600	1993, 1994, 1996	1992, 1995
MAC	5	2	3	.400	1992, 1995	1993, 1994, 1996
Big Ten	4	3	1	.750	2021, 2023, 2024	2025
WAC	4	1	3	.250	2010	1997, 1998, 1999
SEC	3	0	3	.000		2000, 2022, 2024
ACC	1	1	0	1.000	1998	
Big 12	1	1	0	1.000	2025	
The American	1	0	1	.000		2016
Independents	1	0	1	.000		2015

- The record of the Pac-12 includes appearances when the conference was known as the Pac-10 (before 2011).
- Conferences that are defunct or no longer active in FBS are marked in italics.
- Independent appearances: BYU (2015)

== Game records ==
Team	Record, Team vs. Opponent	Year
Most points scored (one team)	56, Boise State vs. Arizona State	2011
Most points scored (losing team)	37, Nevada vs. Toledo (OT); 34, Nevada vs. Bowling Green (regulation)	1995; 1992
Most points scored (both teams)	80, Boise (56) vs. Arizona State (24)	2011
Fewest points allowed	3, shared by: Boise State vs. Utah; Florida vs. Oregon State	2010; 2022
Largest margin of victory	41, Oregon State (55) vs. New Mexico (14)	2003
Total yards	589, UNLV vs. Central Michigan	1994
Rushing yards	359, Utah vs. Colorado State	2014
Passing yards	395, Arizona State vs. Boise State	2011
First downs	33, Toledo vs. Nevada	1995
Fewest yards allowed	127, Oregon State vs. New Mexico	2003
Fewest rushing yards allowed	–11, Boise State vs. Arizona State	2011
Fewest passing yards allowed	33, San Diego State vs. North Carolina	1998
Individual	Record, Player, Team vs. Opponent	Year
All-purpose yards	301, Doug Martin (Boise State)	2011
Touchdowns (all-purpose)	5, Steven Jackson (Oregon State)	2003
Rushing yards	254, Mike Anderson (Utah)	1999
Rushing touchdowns	4, shared by: Wasean Tait, Toledo vs. Nevada; Steven Jackson (Oregon State)	1995; 2003
Passing yards	395, Brock Osweiler (Arizona State)	2011
Passing touchdowns	4, Cody Kessler (USC)	2013
Receiving yards	241, Gerell Robinson (Arizona State)	2011
Receiving touchdowns	2, by several players—most recent: Marqise Lee (USC); Nelson Agholor (USC)	2013; 2013
Tackles	20, Troy Polamalu (USC)	2001
Sacks	3, Mike Crawford (Nevada)	1996
Interceptions	2, by several players—most recent: Jaheem Joseph (Northwestern)	2023
Long Plays	Record, Player, Team vs. Opponent	Year
Touchdown run	84 yds., Doug Martin (Boise State)	2010
Touchdown pass	78 yds., Jason Mass to Pat Johnson (Oregon)	1997
Kickoff return	100 yds., Doug Martin, (Boise State)	2011
Punt return	74 yds., Craig Bragg (UCLA)	2002
Interception return	100 yds., Jamar Taylor (Boise State)	2011
Fumble return		
Punt	69 yds., Garrett Swanson (Fresno State)	2013
Field goal	52 yds., Kai Forbath (UCLA)	2007

== Media coverage ==
The Las Vegas Bowl has been televised by ABC since 2013; ABC also televised the game in 2001. Other editions of the game were broadcast by ESPN or ESPN2.
