= Mike Stoops =

American football player and coach (born 1961)

Ole Miss Rebels
- Title: Defensive analyst

Personal information
- Born: December 13, 1961 (age 64); Youngstown, Ohio, U.S.
- Listed height: 6 ft 1 in (1.85 m)
- Listed weight: 182 lb (83 kg)

Career information
- Position: Defensive back (No. 44)
- High school: Cardinal Mooney
- College: Iowa
- NFL draft: 1985: undrafted

Career history

Playing
- Chicago Bears (1985)*; Atlanta Falcons (1986)*; Pittsburgh Gladiators (1987); Chicago Bears (1987)
- * Offseason or practice squad member only

Coaching
- Iowa (1986–1987) Graduate assistant; Iowa (1991) Linebackers & defensive backs coach; Kansas State (1992–1995) Defensive ends coach; Kansas State (1996) Co-defensive coordinator & defensive ends coach; Kansas State (1997) Co-defensive coordinator & defensive backs coach; Kansas State (1998) Assistant head coach, co-defensive coordinator & defensive backs coach; Oklahoma (1999–2003) Associate head coach, co-defensive coordinator & defensive backs coach; Arizona (2004–2011) Head coach; Oklahoma (2012–2018) Associate head coach, co-defensive coordinator & defensive backs coach; Alabama (2019–2020) Defensive analyst; Florida Atlantic (2021) Defensive coordinator; Kentucky (2022–2025) Inside linebackers coach; Ole Miss (2026–present) Defensive Analyst

Awards and highlights
- 2× First-team All-Big Ten (1983, 1984)
- Stats at Pro Football Reference

Michael Joseph Stoops (born December 13, 1961) is an American football coach and former player. He is a Defensive Assistant Coach/front seven, for the University of Mississippi a position he has held since 2026. Stoops also served as the head football coach at the University of Arizona from 2003 until his firing during the 2011 season. He previously served as an assistant football coach at the University of Iowa, Kansas State University, and University of Oklahoma. He is the younger brother of Bob Stoops, the former head coach of the Oklahoma Sooners football program, and the older brother of Mark Stoops, the former head coach of the Kentucky Wildcats football program. He returned to Oklahoma as the defensive coordinator in 2012. He served in the position until he was fired on October 7, 2018. After spending time at the University of Alabama as an analyst, he spent one season as the defensive coordinator of the Florida Atlantic Owls in 2021.

== Early life and playing career ==
Stoops is one of six children born to Ron Sr. and Evelyn "Dee Dee" Stoops in Youngstown, Ohio. He attended Cardinal Mooney High School in Youngstown, Ohio, where his father was an assistant football coach and defensive coordinator.

After high school Stoops attended the University of Iowa and played for the Hawkeyes (1982–1984) as a strong safety. He played on the same team with quarterback Chuck Long and was a two-time all-Big Ten Conference selection.

Stoops was signed as a free agent in May 1985 by the Chicago Bears of the National Football League (NFL), but was cut on August 27. In February 1986 he signed as a free agent with the Atlanta Falcons, but he missed the Falcons May 9–15 minicamp with a ruptured gall bladder from an auto accident and was later cut by Atlanta.

In the summer of 1987, Stoops became one of the original 80 Arena Football League (AFL) players when he suited up for the Pittsburgh Gladiators. Stoops was a key member of the Gladiators that season who went on to play in the inaugural ArenaBowl, losing to Denver, 45–16. He was named Second-team All-Arena in 1987.

Stoops took time off from his job as a graduate assistant at Iowa to play as a replacement player for a limited time in 1987 with the Chicago Bears during the NFL strike. Wearing #44, he played safety in three games with the Bears that year, suffering a concussion in an October 4 victory (35–3) against the Philadelphia Eagles. Other former Iowa players who were members of the National Football League Players Association had harsh words for Stoops. He responded, "I don't give a damn what they think. I wasn't trying to hurt anybody, and deep down, I think they know that. But if they feel that way, fine, don't ever talk to me again".

Returning to the Arena Football League, in the six-game AFL regular season, Stoops caught 22 passes, scored three touchdowns, made 15 tackles and recorded an interception, playing both wide receiver and defensive back positions.

== Coaching career ==
=== Early coaching ===
Stoops held assistant coaching positions at the University of Iowa, Kansas State University and the University of Oklahoma. With his hiring by Arizona in November 2003, Stoops became the school's youngest coach at hiring at age 41, since Larry Smith. Upon taking over, he hired his brother, University of Miami defensive backs coach Mark Stoops, as defensive coordinator. Stoops then followed and hired Texas Tech co-offensive coordinator Sonny Dykes after the 2006 season. Dykes, named as winner of the All-American Football Foundation's Mike Campbell Top Assistant Award and later head coach at Louisiana Tech, California and SMU, has been cited as one of the country's brightest offensive minds and top ten college recruiters by Rivals.com.

=== Arizona ===
After going 6–6 in 2006, the Wildcats lost three of their first four games in 2007, including a 29–27 loss at home to New Mexico. In that game, Stoops gained a 15-yard unsportsmanlike conduct penalty for his behavior on the sideline, which led to a New Mexico touchdown. Following a 2007, 21–20 home loss to Stanford, dropping the team to 2–6, local media began speculating as to whether Stoops would be fired. However, subsequent statements by the athletic director and the university's president indicated that Stoops would return for an additional season. At the beginning of the season, many believed this to be the year Stoops and the Wildcats would reach their first college bowl game in a decade; a winning season was considered a must in order for Stoops to remain as Wildcats head coach. Under the direction of Stoops, Arizona scored 70 points in the season opener against the Idaho Vandals, falling just four points short of a school record for points scored in a game. They went on to soundly defeat Toledo, UCLA, Washington, and California, but lost close games to New Mexico and Stanford. They went on to defeat Washington State on the road to secure bowl eligibility at six wins, but lost to Oregon on the road after mounting a dramatic second-half come-from-behind rally, and to Oregon State in Tucson on a last-second field goal. The Wildcats' final game of the regular season was a 31–10 victory on December 6 in Tucson against Arizona State in the annual Territorial Cup rivalry game. With that win and a final regular season record of 7–5, Arizona accepted a bid from to the Las Vegas Bowl to face BYU. It was the Wildcats' first bowl appearance since the 1998 Holiday Bowl. Stoops' reputation in Tucson was mixed; while the Wildcats had a winning record and appeared in and won their first bowl game in ten years, many fans were divided during the season on whether he should be retained as head coach, as they expected Stoops to guide the team to an eight, nine or even ten-win season given the talent level and the offensive and defensive systems employed by the Wildcats (and with the overall talent level in the Pac-10 conference perceived to be not as strong as usual in 2008). While Stoops brought the Wildcat football program to a level of respectability which was lost during the era of John Mackovic, some fans were disappointed the program was not at the elite level of Stoops' former program Oklahoma or of perennial Pac-10 football power USC. However, Stoops was given strong votes of confidence by UA (later UNLV) athletic director Jim Livengood, by university president Dr. Robert Shelton, and by several prominent Arizona football boosters.

On December 18, Stoops was rumored to be a candidate for the Iowa State head coaching job, which eventually went to Auburn assistant Paul Rhoads. On December 20, Arizona defeated BYU in the Las Vegas Bowl. On December 23, Stoops was given a contract extension through the 2013 season by Livengood.

"We're very pleased with the progress of Arizona football under Mike's direction," Livengood said. "His personal growth as a coach has been outstanding and we’re glad to continue moving forward with him as the steward for Arizona football."

Stoops said on the news of his extension, "I'm very excited about the extension...The administration always has shown a commitment to what we’re doing, and this bolsters that support...We’re working hard to build stability and the commitment from Jim and the university at this time will go a long way to solidify that effort. I’m happy to be here in Tucson for a long time as head coach of our Wildcats. This is where my family wants to be."

The Wildcats compiled an 8–4 (6–3) record in the 2009 regular season, which earned them a share of second place in the Pac-10 and a bid to the Holiday Bowl. Stoops was named a semifinalist for the George Munger Award, but was not named a finalist.

The Wildcats compiled a 7–5 (4–5) record in the 2010 regular season, which earned them a seventh-place finish in the Pac-10 and a bid to the Alamo Bowl. This bid was due, in part, to only four Pac-10 teams being bowl eligible after USC was sanctioned from bowl eligibility, and Arizona State was denied a bowl waiver from the NCAA, which it needed because two of ASU's wins came against FCS teams. Both USC and Arizona State finished higher than Arizona in the Pac-10 standings. Oregon and Stanford were selected for BCS bowls, and the Rose Bowl selected an at large team, TCU, to pair with the Big Ten champion, Wisconsin, leaving the second highest Pac-10 affiliated bowl game, the Alamo Bowl, to choose between Arizona and Washington.

The Wildcats started the 2011 season losing five of their six games, and their first four games in the newly expanded Pac-12 Conference. After a loss on the road to previously winless Oregon State, Stoops was relieved of his duties on October 10, 2011, with the announcement made by athletic director Greg Byrne. Co-defensive coordinator Tim Kish was named as interim head coach. Stoops received a $1.4 million buyout from Arizona.

=== After Arizona ===
On January 11, 2012, Stoops returned to OU as co-defensive coordinator. He was to be teamed with Brent Venables, who shortly left to become the defensive coordinator at Clemson. Kish was soon after named as Oklahoma's linebackers coach. When his brother retired at the end of the 2016 season, Stoops was retained by his successor, Lincoln Riley.In October 2018, Stoops was fired from his position as defensive coordinator shortly after losing to Texas (48–45).

Nick Saban hired Stoops to be on his coaching staff as an analyst for the 2019 season. Mark Stoops, his brother, offered him a position as an assistant coach at Kentucky for the 2020 season. He declined the position and stayed at Alabama as an analyst. Alabama would go on to win the National Championship that season.

On January 28, 2021, it was announced that Willie Taggart had hired Stoops to be the defensive coordinator for Florida Atlantic.

On January 7, 2022, Mark Stoops, his brother, hired him as linebackers coach at Kentucky. Mark Stoops was fired on December 1, 2025, along with the rest of the staff, including Mike.

== Head coaching record ==
| Year | Team | Overall | Conference | Standing | Bowl/playoffs |
|---|---|---|---|---|---|
Arizona Wildcats (Pac-10/Pac-12 Conference) (2004–2011)
| 2004 | Arizona | 3–8 | 2–6 | T–8th | |
| 2005 | Arizona | 3–8 | 2–6 | 8th | |
| 2006 | Arizona | 6–6 | 4–5 | T–5th | |
| 2007 | Arizona | 5–7 | 4–5 | 6th | |
| 2008 | Arizona | 8–5 | 5–4 | 5th | W Las Vegas |
| 2009 | Arizona | 8–5 | 6–3 | T–2nd | L Holiday |
| 2010 | Arizona | 7–6 | 4–5 | T–5th | L Alamo |
| 2011 | Arizona | 1–5 | 0–4 | (South) | |
| Arizona: | | 41–50 | 27–38 | | |
| Total: | | 41–50 | | | |
