= 2008 BYU Cougars football team =

American college football season

2008 BYU Cougars football

Las Vegas Bowl, L 21–31 vs. Arizona
- Conference: Mountain West Conference

Ranking
- Coaches: No. 21
- AP: No. 25
- Record: 10–3 (6–2 MW)
- Head coach: Bronco Mendenhall (4th season)
- Offensive coordinator: Robert Anae (4th season)
- Offensive scheme: Air raid
- Defensive coordinator: Jaime Hill (1st season)
- Base defense: 3–4
- Captains: Travis Bright; Max Hall; Jan Jorgensen; David Nixon
- Home stadium: LaVell Edwards Stadium

2008 Mountain West Conference football standings
	Conf.			Overall
Team	W		L	W		L
No. 2 Utah $	8	–	0	13	–	0
No. 7 TCU	7	–	1	11	–	2
No. 25 BYU	6	–	2	10	–	3
Air Force	5	–	3	8	–	5
Colorado State	4	–	4	7	–	6
UNLV	2	–	6	5	–	7
New Mexico	2	–	6	4	–	8
Wyoming	1	–	7	4	–	8
San Diego State	1	–	7	2	–	10
$ – Conference champion and BCS representative as top non-AQ school to meet automatic qualification criteria; Rankings from AP Poll

The 2008 BYU Cougars football team represented Brigham Young University in the 2008 NCAA Division I FBS football season.

Prior to the 2008 season, BYU had won consecutive Mountain West Conference (MWC) championship titles without losing a conference game. It had also finished with an 11–2 overall record for consecutive seasons. The Cougars have won four MWC championships since the league began in 1999 (Co-Champions with CSU and Utah in 1999, and sole Champions in 2001, 2006 and 2007), and 23 conference titles overall. BYU ended last season ranked 14th in the nation in the major polls, one of its best finishes in the last two decades.

BYU was selected to win the MWC according to the conference's annual media poll.

The Cougars made their fourth consecutive post-season appearance in the Las Vegas Bowl at Sam Boyd Stadium in Las Vegas, Nevada, losing to the Arizona Wildcats Football 31–21. BYU beat the Oregon Ducks in 2006 and the UCLA Bruins in 2007. BYU lost to the California Golden Bears in the 2005 game.

BYU played its home games at LaVell Edwards Stadium, named after its former coach, LaVell Edwards.

== Pre-season ==
Spring Practice started March 17 and ended April 12 with the annual Blue/White game.

Fall camp began on August 1 with actual practices starting on August 4. Camp ended August 20 with a final scrimmage. Preparation for the first game began on August 22.

BYU begins the season ranked #17 in the USA Today Coaches Poll and #16 in the AP Poll.

David Nixon and Jan Jorgensen for the defense and Max Hall and Travis Bright for the offense were chosen by their teammates as captains for the 2008 season.

== Rankings ==
Ranking movements Legend: ██ Increase in ranking ██ Decrease in ranking
	Week															
Poll	Pre	1	2	3	4	5	6	7	8	9	10	11	12	13	14	Final
AP	16	15	18	14	11	8	9	9	18	17	17	16	16	21	20	25
Coaches	17	15	15	11	11	7	8	8	17	17	16	14	14	19	18	21
Harris	Not released					9	9	8	17	15	16	14	14	18	17	Not released
BCS	Not released								21	20	15	17	14	18	18	Not released

=== Preseason rankings ===
In the pre-season, the Cougars were ranked #19 and then later #14 by ESPN's Mark Schlabach, #12 by Rivals.com David Fox and Steve Megargee, #22 by College Football News, #17 by Stewart Mandel of CNN's SI.com (Sports Illustrated), #12 by Lindy's, #14 by CBS Sportsline, #13 by Tony Barnhart (a.k.a. "Mr. College Football") of the Atlanta Constitution-Journal, #14 by Athlon Sports, #17 by Phil Steele, #16 by CBS College Sport's Adam Caparell, and #10 by New York Times' Paul Myerberg. They started the season ranked 17th in the Coaches Poll (with 547 votes), and ranked 16th in the AP Poll (with 590 votes).

== Schedule ==
Date	Time	Opponent	Rank	Site	TV	Result	Attendance
August 30	4:00 pm	No. 3 (FCS) Northern Iowa*	No. 16	LaVell Edwards Stadium; Provo, Utah	The mtn.	W 41–17	64,108
September 6	1:00 pm	at Washington*	No. 15	Husky Stadium; Seattle, Washington	FSN	W 28–27	64,611
September 13	1:30 pm	UCLA*	No. 18	LaVell Edwards Stadium; Provo, Utah	Versus	W 59–0	64,153
September 20	3:00 pm	Wyoming	No. 14	LaVell Edwards Stadium; Provo, Utah	The mtn.	W 44–0	64,059
October 3	6:00 pm	at Utah State*	No. 8	Romney Stadium; Logan, Utah (Old Wagon Wheel)	BYUtv	W 34–14	23,101
October 11	4:00 pm	New Mexico^{†}	No. 9	LaVell Edwards Stadium; Provo, Utah	The mtn.	W 21–3	64,105
October 16	6:00 pm	at TCU	No. 9	Amon G. Carter Stadium; Fort Worth, Texas	Versus	L 7–32	36,180
October 25	12:00 pm	UNLV	No. 18	LaVell Edwards Stadium; Provo, Utah	The mtn.	W 42–35	64,081
November 1	4:00 pm	at Colorado State	No. 17	Hughes Stadium; Fort Collins, Colorado	The mtn.	W 45–42	20,222
November 8	12:00 pm	San Diego State	No. 17	LaVell Edwards Stadium; Provo, Utah	The mtn.	W 41–12	64,107
November 15	1:30 pm	at Air Force	No. 16	Falcon Stadium; Colorado Springs, Colorado	CBSCS	W 38–24	42,177
November 22	4:00 pm	at No. 8 Utah	No. 16	Rice-Eccles Stadium; Salt Lake City (Holy War)	The mtn./CBSCS	L 24–48	46,488
December 20	6:00 pm	vs. Arizona*	No. 17	Sam Boyd Stadium; Las Vegas (Las Vegas Bowl)	ESPN	L 21–31	40,047
*Non-conference game; ^{†}Homecoming; Rankings from AP Poll released prior to the game; All times are in Mountain time

== Game summaries ==
=== Northern Iowa ===
Team	1	2	3	4	Total
#3 (FCS) Northern Iowa Panthers	3	0	14	0	17
• #16/17 BYU Cougars	14	13	0	14	41

- Date: August 30
- Location: LaVell Edwards Stadium, Provo, UT
- Game start: 4:06 p.m. MST
- Elapsed time: 3:19
- Game attendance: 64,108
- Game weather: 93 °F (34 °C), hot and breezy
- Referee: Terry Leyden
- TV announcers (mtn.): Rich Cellini, Jon Berger, Sammy Linebaugh

Scoring summary
1	8:56	BYU	Michael Reed 27-yard pass from Max Hall (Mitch Payne kick)	BYU 7-0
1	5:31	UNI	Billy Hallgreen 33-yard field goal	BYU 7-3
1	1:25	BYU	Harvey Unga 19-yard pass from Max Hall (Mitch Payne kick)	BYU 14-3
2	4:50	BYU	Harvey Unga 2-yard run (kick blocked)	BYU 20-3
2	0:17	BYU	Harvey Unga 1-yard run (Mitch Payne kick)	BYU 27-3
3	12:12	UNI	Josh Collins 76-yard pass from Victor Williams (Billy Hallgreen kick)	BYU 27-10
3	5:59	UNI	Mark Huygens fumble recovery in the end zone (Billy Hallgreen kick)	BYU 27-17
4	9:02	BYU	Max Hall 1-yard run (Mitch Payne kick)	BYU 34-17
4	7:30	BYU	Bryan Kariya 14-yard run (Mitch Payne kick)	BYU 41-17

This was BYU's first-ever game against the University of Northern Iowa Panthers from the Division I FCS. In recent years the Panthers have proven to be a perennial top program in FCS football. Last year Northern Iowa (UNI) was ranked No. 1 in the FCS until a loss to Delaware in the FCS playoffs. UNI was ranked #3 in the 2008 FCS preseason poll. The Panthers agreed to play BYU at the last minute after Nevada backed out of its agreement to play BYU in 2008. Northern Iowa ended the 2007 season with a considerably stronger Sagarin rating than Nevada and finished #4 in the FCS.

In a very physical game from both teams, the Cougars jumped out to a wide early lead of 27–3 at the half. The Panthers could not stop the Cougar offense from driving the field. Despite an ugly, scoreless, third quarter for BYU, which included four fumbles, the Cougars pulled away again in the fourth quarter to defeat the Panthers 41–17 in front of a sold-out crowd in Provo. BYU's Dennis Pitta caught eleven passes for 213 yards and Max Hall threw with an 83% completion for 486 yards, two touchdowns and no interceptions. Pitta lead the nation in receiving yards and Max was second in the nation for passing yards with a 198.6 rating. On the defensive end, junior college transfer Coleby Clawson made his hard hitting debut, knocking out UNI's quarterback Pat Grace three times. Justin Sorensen put all seven kickoffs into the end zone.

With the exception of three big plays, UNI's offense struggled against BYU's defense, but UNI capitalized on the turnovers in the third quarter to earn both of its touchdowns. UNI quarterback, Pat Grace, broke through for a 69-yard gain that resulted in a field goal. The play after recovering a BYU fumble, UNI ran a reverse with wide receiver, Victor Williams, making a 76-yard touchdown pass. UNI's final score came on a blind-side, forced fumble against Max Hall in the end zone.

David Tafuna carried the team flag onto the field, and LaVell Edwards carried the alumni flag on to the field.

=== Washington ===
Team	1	2	3	4	Total
• #15/15 BYU Cougars	7	7	7	7	28
Washington Huskies	7	7	7	6	27

- Date: September 6
- Location: Husky Stadium, Seattle, WA
- Game start: 12:11 p.m. PST
- Elapsed time: 3:13
- Game attendance: 64,611
- Game weather: 65 °F (18 °C), light overcast, winds E 2 mph (3.2 km/h)
- Referee: Larry Farina
- TV announcers (FSN): Barry Tompkins, Petros Papadakis, John Jackson

Scoring summary
1	9:38	BYU	Austin Collie 38-yard pass from Max Hall (Mitch Payne kick)	BYU 7-0
1	3:24	UW	Jake Locker 14-yard run (Ryan Perkins kick)	TIED 7-7
2	10:38	UW	Jermaine Kearse 48-yard pass from Jake Locker (Ryan Perkins kick)	UW 14-7
2	4:18	BYU	Andrew George 2-yard pass from Max Hall (Mitch Payne kick)	TIED 14-14
3	7:38	UW	Luke Kravitz 1-yard run (Ryan Perkins kick)	UW 21-14
3	4:17	BYU	Fui Vakapuna 11-yard run (Mitch Payne kick)	TIED 21-21
4	3:31	BYU	Dennis Pitta 15-yard pass from Max Hall (Mitch Payne kick)	BYU 28-21
4	0:02	UW	Jake Locker 2-yard run (kick blocked)	BYU 28-27

BYU and Washington met for the seventh time. This was BYU's first win in a non-conference road game since 2002. The last meeting with the Huskies was in 1999, when BYU won in Provo 35–28. Washington marred what would have been a perfect season for BYU in 1996. BYU went on to finish #5 in the country with a 14–1 record, winning 13 regular season games, an NCAA record that still stands.

The Cougars had to contain the Huskies' athletic quarterback, Jake Locker, who ran for nearly 1,000 yards last season. BYU held Locker below his rushing average to 62 yards on 18 attempts. Locker completed only 17 of his 32 passes for 204 yards. Washington had 337 yards of total offense to BYU's 475.

BYU only punted twice in the game. After driving the length of the field again, BYU looked to take the lead early in the fourth quarter when Harvey Unga, who rushed for 136 yards in the game, fumbled the ball at the goal line which was recovered by Washington.

The Cougars won the game by blocking a Washington PAT attempt in the fourth quarter. With 2 seconds left in regulation, the 35-yard extra-point kick by Huskies' Ryan Perkins was blocked by Jan Jorgensen. The PAT was moved back 15 yards on an unsportsmanlike penalty on Locker when he tossed the ball in the air after running the ball in for a touchdown. Two of the last three games BYU has played, they won the game by blocking a last second kick.

Max Hall was named Mountain West Conference Offensive Player of the Week. Hall hit 31 of 40 pass attempts for 338 yards passing and three touchdowns, including a 15-yarder to tight end Dennis Pitta with 3:31 left.

Jan Jorgensen's game winning block was the ESPN Pontiac Game Changing Performance for the week.

Washington Leads series 4-3

=== UCLA ===
Team	1	2	3	4	Total
UCLA Bruins	0	0	0	0	0
• #18/15 BYU Cougars	7	35	17	0	59

- Date: September 13
- Location: LaVell Edwards Stadium, Provo, UT
- Game start: 1:37 p.m. MST
- Elapsed time: 3:02
- Game attendance: 64,153
- Game weather: 70 °F (21 °C), clear sunny, wind S 10 mph (16 km/h)
- Referee: Rich Kollen
- TV announcers (VS.): Joe Beninati, Glenn Parker, Tim Neverett

Scoring summary
1	6:02	BYU	Dennis Pitta 10-yard pass from Max Hall (Mitch Payne kick)	BYU 7-0
2	14:30	BYU	Austin Collie 2-yard pass from Max Hall (Mitch Payne kick)	BYU 14-0
2	12:59	BYU	Austin Collie 37-yard pass from Max Hall (Mitch Payne kick)	BYU 21-0
2	10:07	BYU	Michael Reed 12-yard pass from Max Hall (Mitch Payne kick)	BYU 28-0
2	9:42	BYU	Harvey Unga 15-yard pass from Max Hall (Mitch Payne kick)	BYU 35-0
2	0:14	BYU	Dennis Pitta 2-yard pass from Max Hall (Mitch Payne kick)	BYU 42-0
3	7:43	BYU	Harvey Unga 6-yard pass from Max Hall (Mitch Payne kick)	BYU 49-0
3	3:08	BYU	Mitch Payne 24-yard field goal	BYU 52-0
3	0:39	BYU	Wayne Latu 13-yard run (Mitch Payne kick)	BYU 59-0

UCLA offensive coordinator, Norm Chow (former OC at BYU), and UCLA quarterback, Ben Olson (former BYU player) came back to Provo for the 10th meeting between the Bruins and BYU. The teams faced off twice during the 2007 season. The Cougars defeated UCLA in the 2007 Las Vegas Bowl after the Bruins won a close regular-season meeting. Ben Olson did not play due to injuries.

Kellen Fowler carried the team flag onto the field, and Vai Sikahema carried the alumni flag on to the field.

BYU scored first on a Max Hall pass to Dennis Pitta for 10 yards for a touchdown; Hall then passed to Austin Collie for another score (2 yards). The Cougars recovered a fumble and scored on the next play to take a 21–0 lead. After another Bruins fumble, Hall passed to Michael Reed for another touchdown. Another Bruins fumble gave Hall his 5th pass touchdown in the first half. Hall's 6th touchdown pass was thrown to Pitta.

In the second half, Max Hall passed to Harvey Unga for a 6-yard touchdown, Mitch Payne kicked a 24-yard field goal and Wayne Latu rushed for a 13-yard touchdown to give BYU the 59–0 win. UCLA's worst loss in nearly 80 years.

Given the injuries to BYU's linebackers since fall camp through the first two games, BYU added a nickel package to its defense that proved to be effective.

So far BYU is 16-18 for scoring in the "Blue Zone" including 15 for touchdowns and its first field goal attempt for the season in the UCLA game. BYU's 2 failures were both fumbles, one at the goal line against Washington that rolled in for a touchback.

BYU has no 100-yard rushers against it, and leads the nation in third down conversions to this point.

For the second week in a row, Max Hall was named the MWC Offensive Player of the Week and the Walter Camp Football Foundation's Offensive Player of the Week. Hall broke the BYU record of passing touchdowns during a half with 6 and tied the BYU record for passing touchdowns at 7.

This was the worst loss the Bruins endured since a 76–0 defeat in the very first UCLA–USC rivalry football game in 1929.

UCLA Leads series 7-3

=== Wyoming ===
Team	1	2	3	4	Total
Wyoming Cowboys	0	0	0	0	0
• #14/11 BYU Cougars	7	20	14	3	44

- Date: September 20
- Location: LaVell Edwards Stadium, Provo, UT
- Game start: 1:06 p.m. MST
- Elapsed time: 3:15
- Game attendance: 64,059
- Game weather: 73 °F (23 °C), mostly sunny
- Referee: Frank White
- TV announcers (mtn.): James Bates, Todd Christensen, Sammy Linebaugh

Scoring summary
1	11:10	BYU	Scott Johnson 64-yard fumble return (Mitch Payne kick)	BYU 7-0
2	6:08	BYU	Harvey Unga 1-yard run (Mitch Payne kick)	BYU 14-0
2	4:03	BYU	Austin Collie 62-yard pass from Max Hall (Mitch Payne kick)	BYU 21-0
2	0:31	BYU	Austin Collie 7-yard pass from Max Hall (kick failed)	BYU 27-0
3	11:45	BYU	Harvey Unga 11-yard pass from Max Hall (Mitch Payne kick)	BYU 34-0
3	8:25	BYU	David Nixon 19-yard interception return (Mitch Payne kick)	BYU 41-0
4	6:51	BYU	Justin Sorensen 31-yard field goal	BYU 44-0

This was the 73rd game between Wyoming and BYU. The Cougars have won their last five games against Wyoming by an average of almost 24 points.

BYU allowed Wyoming's offense to move early, but on the Cowboys' first drive the Cougar defense picked up a dropped lateral pass, returning it for six points. BYU's offense started slow, but ended up scoring frequently in the second quarter. The Cougar defense stepped up and held Wyoming to zero points in all four quarters, leading to the second straight shutout, the first consecutive shutout in twenty three years.

David Oswald carried the team flag onto the field, and Ty Detmer carried the alumni flag on to the field. David Nixon, who returned an interception 19 yards for a touchdown, was honored as the MWC Defensive Player of the Week. C.J. Santiago was named as the MWC Special Teams Player of the Week. Santiago had seven punts for an average of 46.7 yards per kick, including a season high punt for 61 yards. His first three punts were all downed inside the Wyoming 20-yard line: the first at the 11, the second at the 5 and the third at the 4-yard line.

BYU Leads series 40-30-3

=== Utah State ===
Team	1	2	3	4	Total
• #8/7 BYU Cougars	24	0	10	0	34
Utah State Aggies	0	0	0	14	14

- Date: October 3
- Location: Romney Stadium, Logan, UT
- Game start: 6:07 p.m. MST
- Elapsed time: 3:09
- Game attendance: 23,101
- Game weather: cloudy and warm
- Referee: Bill Athan
- TV announcers (KJZZ, BYUtv): Steve Brown, Mike Norseth, Alema Harrington

Scoring summary
1	11:51	BYU	Austin Collie 76-yard pass from Max Hall (Mitch Payne kick)	BYU 7-0
1	8:09	BYU	Brando Bradley 38-yard fumble return (Mitch Payne kick)	BYU 14-0
1	1:46	BYU	Mitch Payne 45-yard field goal	BYU 17-0
1	1:23	BYU	Harvey Unga 11-yard run (Mitch Payne kick)	BYU 24-0
3	11:21	BYU	Mitch Payne 21-yard field goal	BYU 27-0
3	1:26	BYU	Austin Collie 12-yard pass from Max Hall (Mitch Payne kick)	BYU 34-0
4	13:47	USU	Robert Turbin 40-yard run (Peter Caldwell kick)	BYU 34-7
4	9:22	USU	Tarren Lloyd 5-yard pass from Diondre Borel (Peter Caldwell kick)	BYU 34-14

This was the 78th game between the Utah State Aggies and BYU. The annual winner of this interstate contest is awarded The Old Wagon Wheel. The Aggies have not beaten BYU since 1993. BYU defeated Utah State 38–0 in their last meeting in 2006.

The Cougars started fast in the first quarter with a 76-yard touchdown pass, followed by a 35-yard fumble recovery for a touchdown, a field goal, and then an interception resulting in another touchdown. Hall completed 23 of 47 passes for 303 yards, 2 touchdowns and 2 interceptions. Unga rushed 21 times for 86 yards and a touchdown. Collie added 8 receptions for 132 yards and 2 touchdowns.

BYU was plagued with penalties particularly in the last quarter. They had 12 penalties for 123 yards with several personal fouls including an unnecessary roughness penalty by Max Hall.

The Aggie's mobile quarterback, Diondre Borel, and speedy running back, Robert Turbin, gave the Cougars some trouble rushing for a combined 117 yards including a 40-yard break-away run for a touchdown by Turbin early in the fourth quarter.

BYU Leads series 42-33-3

=== New Mexico ===
Team	1	2	3	4	Total
New Mexico Lobos	0	3	0	0	3
• #9/8 BYU Cougars	0	7	7	7	21

- Date: October 11
- Location: LaVell Edwards Stadium, Provo, UT
- Game start: 4:06 p.m. MST
- Elapsed time: 2:36
- Game attendance: 64,105
- Game weather: 39 °F (4 °C), cloudy
- Referee: Pete Gautreau
- TV announcers (mtn.): Tim Neverett, Blaine Fowler, Sammy Linebaugh

Scoring summary
2	11:40	UNM	James Aho 27-yard field goal	UNM 3-0
2	6:34	BYU	Andrew George 1-yard pass from Max Hall (Mitch Payne kick)	BYU 7-3
3	6:08	BYU	Andrew George 11-yard pass from Max Hall (Mitch Payne kick)	BYU 14-3
4	3:05	BYU	Austin Collie 8-yard pass from Max Hall (Mitch Payne kick)	BYU 21-3

This was the 58th game between New Mexico and BYU. The Cougars have won four games in a row against the Lobos.

BYU entertained a 3-3 New Mexico squad at the midway point of the season as chilly October afternoon air settled in Provo. The Cougars held a 15-game winning streak and survived their lowest-scoring game thus far in 2008 to remain unbeaten on homecoming. New Mexico opened the scoring with a short field goal early in the second quarter after the teams traded four punts. Austin Collie sparked the BYU offense with a 58-yard reception on a streak down the sideline and Max Hall found tight end Andrew George in the back of the end zone to take a 7–3 lead. Kicker Justin Sorensen missed a 50-yard field goal before halftime, but Max Hall and George linked up for another score again in the third quarter to extend the lead to 14–3. The Lobos looked to score with 7:14 left in the game to trim the lead, but an illegal block wiped out the touchdown and the drive stalled. The Cougars responded with a 12-play 76-yard drive ending with an 8-yard scoring reception by Collie to seal the game, 21–3. Hall threw for 258 yards and three touchdowns, while Collie finished with nine receptions for 155 yards and a score.

BYU Leads series 43-14-1

=== TCU ===
Team	1	2	3	4	Total
#9/8 BYU Cougars	0	0	7	0	7
• #27/24 TCU Horned Frogs	14	9	9	0	32

- Date: October 16
- Location: Amon G. Carter Stadium, Ft. Worth, TX
- Game start: 7:00 p.m. CST
- Elapsed time: 3:11
- Game attendance: 36,180
- Game weather: 69 °F (21 °C), partly cloudy, wind ENE 15 mph (24 km/h)
- Referee: Terry Leyden
- TV announcers (VS.): Joe Beninati, Glenn Parker, Tim Neverett

Scoring summary
1	12:10	TCU	Jimmy Young 25-yard pass from Andy Dalton (Ross Evans kick)	TCU 7-0
1	6:08	TCU	Jeremy Kerley 16-yard run (Ross Evans kick)	TCU 14-0
2	14:45	TCU	Ross Evans 21-yard field goal	TCU 17-0
2	1:06	TCU	Walter Bryant 12-yard pass from Andy Dalton (kick failed)	TCU 23-0
3	11:41	TCU	Ross Evans 31-yard field goal	TCU 26-0
3	4:26	BYU	Max Hall 2-yard run (Mitch Payne kick)	TCU 26-7
3	0:16	TCU	Joseph Turner 5-yard run (kick failed)	TCU 32-7

This was the 8th game between TCU and BYU, played on a Thursday night for the third straight year.

This was the first loss for the BYU Football program since the 2007 setback against Tulsa. TCU Head Coach Gary Patterson had said this was a game his program was pointing towards since January of that year. BYU trails the series 5-6

=== UNLV ===
Team	1	2	3	4	Total
UNLV Rebels	7	14	7	7	35
• #18/17 BYU Cougars	14	7	7	14	42

- Date: October 25
- Location: LaVell Edwards Stadium, Provo, UT
- Game start: 12:06 p.m. MST
- Elapsed time: 3:01
- Game attendance: 64,081
- Game weather: 57 °F (14 °C), clear, No wind
- Referee: Land Clark
- TV announcers (mtn.): James Bates, Todd Christensen, Sammy Linebaugh

Scoring summary
1	12:25	BYU	Andrew George 8-yard pass from Max Hall (Mitch Payne kick)	BYU 7-0
1	6:33	UNLV	Frank Summers 6-yard run (Kyle Watson kick)	TIED 7-7
1	1:34	BYU	O'Neill Chambers 20-yard pass from Max Hall (Mitch Payne kick)	BYU 14-7
2	13:18	UNLV	Mike Clausen 1-yard run (Kyle Watson kick)	TIED 14-14
2	7:18	BYU	Harvey Unga 2-yard run (Mitch Payne kick)	BYU 21-14
2	4:51	UNLV	Frank Summers 1-yard run (Kyle Watson kick)	TIED 21-21
3	7:52	BYU	Fui Vakapuna 1-yard pass from Max Hall (Mitch Payne kick)	BYU 28-21
3	2:46	UNLV	Mike Clausen 2-yard run (Kyle Watson kick)	TIED 28-28
4	14:11	BYU	Mitch Payne 26-yard field goal	BYU 31-28
4	8:36	BYU	Mitch Payne 39-yard field goal	BYU 34-28
4	6:49	UNLV	Ryan Wolfe 15-yard pass from Omar Clayton (Kyle Watson kick)	UNLV 35-34
4	1:46	BYU	Dennis Pitta 6-yard pass from Max Hall (Harvey Unga pass from Max Hall)	BYU 42-35

This was the 16th game between UNLV and BYU.

BYU Leads series 13-3

=== Colorado State ===
Team	1	2	3	4	Total
• #17/17 BYU Cougars	7	14	3	21	45
Colorado State Rams	14	7	7	14	42

- Date: November 1
- Location: Hughes Stadium, Ft. Collins, CO
- Game start: 4:06 p.m. MST
- Elapsed time: 3:21
- Game attendance: 20,222
- Game weather: 74 °F (23 °C), Partly cloudy
- Referee: Frank White
- TV announcers (mtn.): James Bates, Todd Christensen, Roger Bailey

Scoring summary
1	12:58	CSU	Mychal Sisson 20-yard fumble return (Jason Smith kick)	CSU 7-0
1	10:09	BYU	Austin Collie 58-yard pass from Max Hall (Mitch Payne kick)	TIED 7-7
1	3:27	CSU	John Mosure 9-yard rush (Jason Mosure kick)	CSU 14-7
2	8:20	BYU	Austin Collie 15-yard pass from Max Hall (Mitch Payne kick)	TIED 14-14
2	3:50	CSU	Dion Morton 32-yard pass from Billy Farris (Jason Smith kick)	CSU 21-14
2	0:38	BYU	Austin Collie 10-yard pass from Max Hall (Mitch Payne kick)	TIED 21-21
3	6:56	CSU	Rashaun Greer 6-yard pass from Billy Farris (Jason Smith kick)	CSU 28-21
3	2:34	BYU	Mitch Payne 30-yard field goal	CSU 28-24
4	13:15	BYU	Dennis Pitta 23-yard pass from Max Hall (Mitch Payne kick)	BYU 31-28
4	7:20	CSU	Gartre Johnson 7-yard run (Jason Smith kick)	CSU 35-31
4	5:49	BYU	Harvey Unga 40-yard run (Mitch Payne kick)	BYU 38-35
4	1:44	CSU	Dion Morton 55-yard pass from Billy Farris (Jason Smith kick)	CSU 42-38
4	0:22	BYU	Dennis Pitta 17-yard pass from Max Hall (Mitch Payne kick)	BYU 45-42

This was the 67th game between Colorado State and BYU.

BYU Leads series 36-27-3

=== San Diego State ===
Team	1	2	3	4	Total
San Diego State Aztecs	0	0	6	6	12
• #17/16 BYU Cougars	7	13	7	14	41

- Date: November 8
- Location: LaVell Edwards Stadium, Provo, UT
- Game start: 12:06 p.m. MST
- Elapsed time: 3:03
- Game attendance: 64,107
- Game weather: 52 °F (11 °C), sunny w/ high clouds, No wind
- Referee: Bill McCabe
- TV announcers (mtn.): Rich Cellini, Jon Berger, Sammy Linebaugh

Scoring summary
1	9:42	BYU	Fui Vakapuna 7-yard run (Mitch Payne kick)	BYU 7-0
2	8:37	BYU	Mitch Payne 34-yard field goal	BYU 10-0
2	5:19	BYU	Andrew George 6-yard pass from Max Hall (Mitch Payne kick)	BYU 17-0
2	0:36	BYU	Mitch Payne 25-yard field goal	BYU 20-0
3	12:55	BYU	Wayne Latu 3-yard run (Mitch Payne kick)	BYU 27-0
3	4:18	SDSU	Lane Yoshida 49-yard field goal	BYU 27-3
3	1:10	SDSU	Lane Yoshida 34-yard field goal	BYU 27-6
4	14:03	BYU	Austin Collie 61-yard pass from Max Hall (Mitch Payne kick)	BYU 34-6
4	10:07	BYU	Austin Collie 9-yard pass from Max Hall (Mitch Payne kick)	BYU 41-6
4	0:49	SDSU	Darren Mougey 9-yard pass from Ryan Lindley (kick failed)	BYU 41-12

This was the 33rd game between San Diego State and BYU. It was "Senior Day" for BYU, and in honor of the occasion, the field had a different look then usual. The endzones were painted in blue, along with the 50-yard line logo. That too, was filled in with blue.

BYU Leads Series 25-7-1

=== Air Force ===
Team	1	2	3	4	Total
• #16/14 BYU Cougars	7	3	21	7	38
Air Force Falcons	0	14	3	7	24

- Date: November 15
- Location: Falcon Stadium, Air Force Academy, CO
- Game start: 1:36 p.m. MST
- Elapsed time: 3:14
- Game attendance: 42,177
- Game weather: 40's°F, Partly cloudy
- Referee: Dan Romeo
- TV announcers (CBSCS): Tom Hart, Trev Alberts

Scoring summary
1	7:41	BYU	Fui Vakapuna 11-yard run (Mitch Payne kick)	BYU 7-0
2	13:29	BYU	Mitch Payne 46-yard field goal	BYU 10-0
2	6:44	AFA	Asher Clark 6-yard run (Ryan Harrison kick)	BYU 10-7
2	1:55	AFA	Todd Newell 1-yard run (Ryan Harrison kick)	AFA 14-10
3	10:58	BYU	Harvey Unga 1-yard run (Mitch Payne kick)	BYU 17-14
3	9:44	BYU	Harvey Unga 2-yard run (Mitch Payne kick)	BYU 24-14
3	5:15	BYU	Austin Collie 6-yard pass from Max Hall (Mitch Payne kick)	BYU 31-14
3	0:56	AFA	Ryan Harrison 34-yard field goal	BYU 31-17
4	7:37	AFA	Jared Tew 19-yard run (Ryan Harrison kick)	BYU 31-24
4	4:46	BYU	Austin Collie 45-yard pass from Max Hall (Mitch Payne kick)	BYU 38-24

This was the 29th game between Air Force and BYU. BYU has won the last 5 games against the Falcons.

BYU Leads series 23-6

=== Utah ===
Team	1	2	3	4	Total
#16/14 BYU Cougars	3	14	7	0	24
• #8/7 Utah Utes	10	17	0	21	48

- Date: November 22
- Location: Rice-Eccles Stadium, Salt Lake City, UT
- Game start: 4:10 p.m. MST
- Elapsed time: 3:28
- Game attendance: 46,488
- Game weather: 48 °F (9 °C), Partly cloudy, Winds WSW 7 mph (11 km/h)
- Referee: Greg Burks
- TV announcers (mtn.): Rich Cellini, Jon Berger, Blaine Fowler, Sammy Linebaugh, Toby Christensen

Scoring summary
1	9:48	UU	Louie Sakoda 37-yard field goal	UU 3-0
1	8:27	BYU	Mitch Payne 40-yard field goal	TIED 3-3
1	4:25	UU	Brent Castell 16-yard pass from Brian Johnson (Louie Sakoda kick)	UU 10-3
2	13:44	UU	Matt Asiata 5-yard run (Louie Sakoda kick)	UU 17-3
2	10:38	BYU	Harvey Unga 23-yard run (Mitch Payne kick)	UU 17-10
2	6:26	BYU	Harvey Unga 2-yard run (Mitch Payne kick)	TIED 17-17
2	1:41	UU	Louie Sakoda 35-yard field goal	UU 20-17
2	0:15	UU	David Reed 32-yard pass from Brian Johnson (Louie Sakoda kick)	UU 27-17
3	6:46	BYU	Max Hall 11-yard run (Mitch Payne kick)	UU 27-24
4	14:31	UU	Brent Castell 8-yard pass from Brian Johnson (Louie Sakoda kick)	UU 34-24
4	12:00	UU	Chris Joppru 4-yard pass from Matt Asiata (Louie Sakoda kick)	UU 41-24
4	2:48	UU	Colt Sampson 1-yard pass from Brian Johnson (Louie Sakoda kick)	UU 48-24

This is an annual rivalry game unofficially dubbed "Holy War." Along with Utah State, these teams also compete annually for the "Beehive Boot." This game is typically the most anticipated of the season for BYU and its fans. In November 2005, The Wall Street Journal ranked the BYU–Utah football rivalry as the fourth-best college football rivalry game in the country. This will be the 84th game between the teams dating back to 1922. Utah dominated the series 34-2-4 through 1964. Since that time BYU has led the series 28–16. The Cougars were throttled in a 48–24 defeat against the Utes. It was the largest margin of victory since 2004 when the Cougars lost to the Utes 52–21. The rivalry is known for close, exciting finishes. Since 1993, the margin of victory has been seven points or less in all but three games. At stake is the MWC championship, Utah's winning streak (longest in the nation), and a BCS Bowl berth.

Utah leads Series 53-33-4

=== Las Vegas Bowl: Arizona ===
Team	1	2	3	4	Total
#20/18 BYU Cougars	0	7	7	7	21
• Arizona Wildcats	7	3	14	7	31

- Date: December 20
- Location: Sam Boyd Stadium, Las Vegas, NV
- Game start: 5:06 p.m. PST
- Elapsed time: 3:41
- Game attendance: 40,047
- Game weather: 44 °F (7 °C), partly cloudy and cold, no wind
- Referee: Jeff Flanagan
- TV announcers (ESPN/Sports USA): Mike Patrick, Todd Blackledge, Holly Rowe (ESPN)
  Eli Gold, Gary Barnett, Rich Herrera (Sports USA)

Scoring summary
1	6:23	UA	Nic Grigsby 1-yard run (Jason Bondzio kick)	UA 7-0
2	9:21	UA	Jason Bondzio 31-yard field goal	UA 10-0
2	6:50	BYU	Harvey Unga 1-yard run (Mitch Payne kick)	UA 10-7
3	11:21	BYU	Andrew George 1-yard pass from Max Hall (Mitch Payne kick)	BYU 14-10
3	7:07	UA	Delashaun Dean 37-yard pass from Willie Tuitama (Jason Bondzio kick)	UA 17-14
3	0:25	UA	Chris Gronkowski 24-yard pass from Willie Tuitama (Jason Bondzio kick)	UA 24-14
4	6:09	UA	Willie Tuitama 6-yard run (Jason Bondzio kick)	UA 31-14
4	3:38	UA	Max Hall 1-yard run (Mitch Payne kick)	UA 31-21

BYU became bowl eligible by finishing the season with a strong 10–2 record. On December 7, the Cougars were officially invited to the Las Vegas Bowl for the fourth consecutive year. On December 20, 2008, BYU played the Arizona Wildcats who finished fifth in the Pac-10 conference with a 7–5 record. The Cougars lost the game, 31–21, to finish the season with a 10–3 record.

== Coaching and player changes ==
Jaime Hill was promoted to defensive coordinator on January 10. Prior to this, Bronco Mendenhall was acting as both head coach and defensive coordinator. Mendenhall has retained responsibility for play-calling during games.

Vic So'oto moved from tight end to outside linebacker as a starter. Daniel Sorensen, a safety, also moved to outside linebacker.

== Coaching staff ==
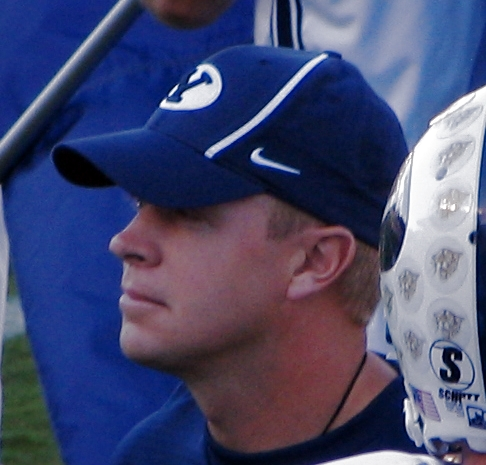
Bronco Mendenhall, Head Coach

Name	Position	Year at BYU	Alma mater (Year)
Bronco Mendenhall	Head coach	6th 2003–present	Oregon State (1987)
Lance Reynolds	Assistant head coach/ Running backs	26th 1983–present	BYU (1980)
Robert Anae	Offensive coordinator/ Inside receivers	4th 2005–present	BYU (1986)
Jaime Hill	Defensive coordinator/ Defensive backs	3rd 2006–present	San Francisco State University (1986)
Brandon Doman	Quarterbacks	4th 2005–present	BYU (2002)
Patrick Higgins	Outside receivers/ Special teams	4th 2005–present	William Penn University (1986)
Barry Lamb	Outside linebackers/ Safeties	16th 1994–present	Oregon (1978)
Paul Tidwell	Inside linebackers	8th 2001–present	Southern Utah University (1979)
Mark Weber	Offensive line	2nd 2007	Cal Lutheran (1980)
Steve Kaufusi	Defensive line	7th 2002–present	BYU (1994)
Jay Omer	Strength and conditioning	8th 2001–present	Southern Utah University (1972)
Kelly Bills	Graduate assistant	1st 2008	BYU (current)
Nick Howell	Graduate assistant	1st 2008	BYU (current)

== Players ==
The 14 returning starters from last season are Max Hall (quarterback), Harvey Unga (tail back), Austin Collie and Michael Reed (wide receivers), Dennis Pitta (tight end), Travis Bright and Ray Feinga (offensive guards), Dallas Reynolds and David Oswald (offensive tackles), Jan Jorgensen and Ian Dulan (defensive ends), Russell Tialavea (nose tackle), David Nixon (linebacker), and Kellen Fowler (free safety). Bryce Mahuika also returns as a slot back and kick holder. Experienced lettermen starting this year include: Fui Vakapuna (fullback), Matt Bauman, Shawn Doman, and Coleby Clawson (linebackers), Brandon Howard (field corner), and David Tafuna (strong safety).

=== Statistical leaders ===
==== Passing ====
Passing
Player	COMP	ATT	Pct.	YDS	TD	INT	QB rating
Max Hall	279	390	71.5%	3,424	34	8	169.95

==== Rushing ====
Rushing
Player	ATT	YDS	YPC	TD
Harvey Unga	208	945	4.5	8
Fui Vakapuna	49	225	4.6	3
Austin Collie	7	60	8.6	0
Max Hall	48	57	1.2	2
Wayne Latu	14	51	3.6	2
J.J. DiLuigi	13	48	3.7	0
Bryan Kariya	8	36	4.4	1

==== Receiving ====
Receiving
Player	REC	YDS	YPC	TD
Austin Collie	85	1,315	15.5	15
Dennis Pitta	76	992	13.1	6
Michael Reed	35	414	11.8	2
Harvey Unga	38	298	7.8	4
Andrew George	21	204	9.7	5

==== Defense ====
Tackles & Interceptions
Player	Solo	Asst	Total	TFL	Sacks	QBH	Int	BrUp	FF	FR	Blkk
Matt Bauman	39	50	89	8.5	2	1	-	1	1	1	-
David Nixon	37	40	77	10.5	1	5	3	4	2	1	1
Kellen Fowler	43	22	65	-	-	-	-	2	-	1	-
Scott Johnson	27	30	57	2	-	-	-	5	1	1	-
Shawn Doman	17	34	51	1	-	1	-	3	1	2	-
Jan Jorgensen	20	29	49	7.5	5	11	-	1	2	1	1
David Tafuna	27	21	48	-	-	-	1	2	-	-	-
Coleby Clawson	23	23	46	10	4	3	-	2	-	3	-
Matt Ah You	16	28	44	.5	-	-	-	1	-	1	-
Brandon Howard	15	17	32	-	-	-	1	2	-	-	-
Brett Denney	19	11	30	7.5	1	4	-	1	-	3	-
Brandon Bradley	24	4	28	-	-	-	-	2	-	1	-
Andrew Rich	12	12	24	-	-	-	1	1	1	1	-
Matt Putnam	14	9	23	3	2	2	1	3	-	-	-
Ian Dulan	7	11	18	4	3	4	-	-	-	1	-
Russell Tialavea	7	9	16	2.5	-	-	-	2	-	-	1

=== Injuries and Suspensions ===
Russell Tialavea (nose tackle) and David Tafuna (strong safety) are recovered from their injuries suffered during the 2007 preseason. Both Travis Bright (right guard) and Garret Reden (reserve left guard) have recovered from their broken leg injuries. Bright holds the title of the team's strongest man aka Strong Man On Campus (SMOC): he holds the football team's school record for bench press (540 pounds) from his workout this summer, and the team record for the hang clean lift (434 pounds).

Terrance Hooks, a reserve inside linebacker, tore his patella tendon during Spring practice and underwent surgery the following day. He has missed most of the 2008 season.

In late spring, senior fullback Manase Tonga was ruled to be academically ineligible for the 2008 season, and was suspended from school. Tonga may re-apply for admission in October for the 2009 Winter Semester.

Just prior to Fall Camp Grant Nelson, a backup for outside linebacker behind Vic So'oto, had two surgeries related to kidney problems and will miss the 2008 season. Austin Collie, starting wide receiver, had limited participation in Fall Camp while recovering from a stress facture in his lower leg. Matt Bauman, starting inside linebacker, missed the beginning of camp while he recovered from a foot injury suffered in a scooter accident.

Projected starting center, Tom Sorensen, had limited participation in camp with a shoulder problem. After attempting a moderate treatment, he opted for surgery and will miss 4 to 6 weeks to recover.

Dan Van Sweden, reserve inside linebacker, broke his leg during camp and will be out 8 to 10 weeks.

In the third week of camp, Kelly Bills, reserve fullback, quit as a player after suffering his fourth concussion, but was enthused to stay on as a graduate assistant for the team.

Starting fullback, Fui Vakapuna, missed the first game against Northern Iowa due to an academic issue which he resolved that week.

Vic So'oto, starting outside linebacker, broke his foot in the first half in the game against Washington and is expected to be out for about 5 to 8 weeks.

Michael Reed, starting wide receiver, injured his knee in the Wyoming game and was out for 3 weeks before returning for the New Mexico game.

G. Pittman became academically ineligible under team rules about mid-season and chose to transfer to Washington State.

Scott Johnson suffered an unlikely double groin tear in the Colorado State game and was out for the rest of the season.

=== Players' backgrounds ===
Because BYU is sponsored by the Church of Jesus Christ of Latter-day Saints (LDS Church), many of the team members are Latter-day Saints (LDS) commonly referred to as Mormons. Because of this religious and cultural affiliation, many of the team members have served a two-year proselyting mission (often in a foreign country, speaking the native language), are married, and sometimes have children. Because of missions the average age of the team is often slightly higher than other college football teams. The effect of a mission is believed to be both an advantage and a disadvantage. It is an advantage in that the players can be either more physically developed, or more intellectually or emotionally mature. It is a disadvantage in that the player often returns from the mission grossly under-conditioned and out of practice. A player often redshirts his first year back from his mission.

Because of the long-standing ties of the LDS Church in Polynesia, many football players are also Polynesian. Bryce Mahuika, for example, is Māori, and he introduced the tradition of the team performing the Haka in 2005.

Of the players participating in 2008 fall Camp, 60 served a two-year mission and 42 speak a second language. Sixteen players speak Spanish, twelve speak Tongan, eight speak Portuguese, two speak German, and one each speaks Mandarin Chinese, French, Haitian Creole, and Tagalog. There are 27 married players. The most recent newlywed, Dennis Pitta, married quarterback Max Hall's sister-in-law.

=== Roster ===
2008 Roster
Edit
Wide receivers: #2 Bryce Mahuika^{††} – senior; #3 Michael Reed^{††} – senior; #7 Tyler Kozlowski – (redshirt) Sophomore; #9 Austin Collie^{††}– junior; #11 O'Neill Chambers – freshman; #13 Luke Ashworth – sophomore; #16 BJ Peterson – sophomore; #20 Reed White^{†} – senior; #27 Matt Marshall – (redshirt) Freshman; #83 Spencer Hafoka – freshman; #85 Landon Jaussi – sophomore; Fullbacks: #1 Fui Vakapuna^{††} – senior; #28 Bryan Kariya – freshman; #30 Isaac Taylor – senior; Offensive linemen: #53 Tom Sorensen^{††}* – junior; #56 Chris Muehlmann^{††} – senior; #59 John Pace^{††} – sophomore; #60 Terence Brown – sophomore; #61 Mark Freeman – sophomore; #62 Lawrence Pico – freshman; #63 Jesse Taufi – junior; #64 R.J. Willing – junior; #65 Dallas Reynolds^{††} – senior; #66 Garrett Reden – (redshirt) sophomore; #67 Nate Hartung – freshman; #68 David Oswald^{††} – senior; #70 Matt Reynolds^{†} – (redshirt) freshman; #72 Nick Alletto – (redshirt) sophomore; #72 Jason Speredon – (redshirt) sophomore; #74 Travis Bright^{††} – senior; #75 Stetson Tenney – freshman; #76 Ray Feinga^{††} – senior; #78 Brock Stringham – freshman; #79 Ron Best – freshman; Punters/kickers: #18 Justin Sorensen^{†} – freshman; #26 C.J. Santiago^{††} – senior; #38 Mitch Payne^{††} – (redshirt) sophomore	Tight ends: #32 Dennis Pitta^{††} – junior; #80 Kaneakua Friel – (redshirt) Freshman; #88 Andrew George – junior; #96 Braden Brown – freshman; #96 Jonathan McCullough – sophomore; Quarterbacks: #4 Kurt McEuen – (redshirt) sophomore; #6 Brenden Gaskins – junior; #10 Stephen Covey – (redshirt) Freshman; #13 Christian Stewart – freshman; #15 Max Hall^{††} – junior; Tailbacks: #10 J.J. DiLuigi – (redshirt) Freshman; #33 Wayne Latu – junior; #34 Tucker Lamb – freshman; #44 Jerry Bruner – freshman; #45 Harvey Unga^{††} – (redshirt) sophomore; Defensive line: #51 Matt Ah You – junior; #52 Russell Tialavea^{††} – junior; #54 Kyle Luekenga – junior; #55 Solomone Kafu – freshman; #71 Rick Wolfley – (redshirt) sophomore; #77 Ian Dulan – junior; #84 Jan Jorgensen^{††} – junior; #90 Bernard Afutiti – junior; #92 Brett Denney^{†} – junior; #93 Mosese Foketi – senior; #94 Brock Richardson – senior; #97 Tevita Hola – junior; #98 Justin Blackmore – freshman; #99 Victor Unga – freshman; (†)† (Returning) starter at position * Injured ** Suspended *** Transferred	Linebackers: #6 Daniel Sorensen – freshman; #34 Jefferson Court – freshman; #35 Matt Bauman^{†} – junior; #37 Vic So'oto* – junior; #39 Grant Nelson* – (redshirt) sophomore; #39 Iona Pritchard – freshman; #41 Coleby Clawson^{†} – junior; #42 Shawn Doman^{†} – junior; #43 David Nixon ^{††} – senior; #44 Dan Van Sweden – junior; #45 Shane Hunter – sophomore; #46 Masi Tuitama – freshman; #47 Dustin Graham – freshman; #47 Terrance Hooks* – junior; #48 Michael Alisa – freshman; #49 Jadon Wagner – (redshirt) freshman; #50 Spencer Hadley – freshman; #51 Matt Ah You – junior; #57 Matt Putnam – (redshirt) freshman; #58 Jeff Bell – junior; Cornerbacks: #4 Brandon Howard^{†} – junior; #5 Brandon Bradley^{†} – (redshirt) sophomore; #17 G Pittman*** – (redshirt) freshman; #21 Scott Johnson* – junior; Safeties: #2 Shiloah Te'o – freshman; #16 Kellen Fowler^{††} – senior; #22 Andrew Rich – sophomore; #23 David Tafuna^{†} – senior; #27 Jordan Pendelton – (redshirt) freshman; Defensive backs: #7 Garett Nicholson – freshman; #12 Brannon Brooks – (redshirt) freshman; #18 Travis Uale – freshman; #19 Cameron Comer – freshman; #19 Rex Morgan – freshman; #24 Steven Thomas – (redshirt) freshman; #25 Gary Nagy – (redshirt) freshman; #26 Ryan Love – freshman; #29 Tana Uyema – freshman; #30 Blake Morgan – freshman; #31 Jameson Frazier – freshman; #31 Byron Putnam – freshman

=== Depth chart ===
Edit

Defensive Starters

FS
Kellen Fowler
Andrew Rich

BCB
Brandon Bradley
Andrew Rich

WLB	BLB	MLB	SLB
Coleby Clawson	Shawn Doman	Matt Bauman	David Nixon
Michael Alisa	Matt Ah You	Iona Pritchard	Daniel Sorensen

LE	NT	RE
Brett Denney	Russell Tialavea	Jan Jorgenson
Matt Putnam	Ian Dulan	Matt Putnam

KAT/SS
David Tafuna
Shiloah Te'o

FCB
Brandon Howard
Gary Nagy

Offensive Starters

SE/XR
Michael Reed
O'Neill Chambers

LT	LG	C	RG	RT
Matt Reynolds	Ray Feinga	Dallas Reynolds	Travis Bright	David Oswald
R.J. Willing	Terence Brown	Garrett Reden	Jason Speredon	Nick Alleto

TE/YR
Dennis Pitta
Andrew George

SB/HR
Kaneakua Friel
Reed White

QB
Max Hall
Brenden Gaskins

FL/ZR
Austin Collie
Luke Ashworth

FB
Fui Vakapuna
Wayne Latu

TB
Harvey Unga
J.J. DiLuigi

Special teams
Kicker Mitch Payne or Justin Sorensen	Punter C.J. Santiago Justin Sorensen	DS John Pace (PK/FG) or Chris Muehlmann (Punt)	Holder Bryce Mahuika Austin Collie or Brenden Gaskins

Kickoff cover unit
Andrew Rich, O'Neill Chambers, Daniel Sorensen, Shiloah Te'o, Matt Bauman (or Iona Pritchard),
Coleby Clawson, Kaneakua Friel, Jeff Bell, Bryan Kariya and Isaac Taylor

KR O'Neill Chambers & Austin Collie	PR O'Neill Chambers or Reed White

=== Recruits ===
Recruits joining the team this year include O'Neill Chambers and Justin Sorensen. Justin Sorensen was widely regarded as the best high school football kicker in the country last year with a record high 62-yard field goal and kickoffs that regularly go into the endzone and often through the goal posts.

== Awards and citations ==
=== Outland Trophy ===
Senior offensive linemen, Ray Feinga and Dallas Reynolds, were named to the 2008 Outland Trophy watch list. BYU boasts two previous Outland Trophy winners, defensive lineman Jason Buck (1986) and offensive lineman Mohammed Elewonibi (1989).

=== Lott Trophy ===
Jan Jorgensen was selected as a preseason candidate for the Lott Trophy's Defensive IMPACT Player of the Year. He is one of 42 preseason candidates being considered for the award.

=== Bronko Nagurski Trophy ===
Jan Jorgensen was named to the preseason watch list for the Bronko Nagurski Trophy which is awarded to the best defensive player in college football.

=== Ted Hendricks Award ===
Jan Jorgensen is also a candidate for the Ted Hendricks Award presented to the premier defensive end in college football.

=== Chuck Bednarik Award ===
Jan Jorgensen is a candidate for the Chuck Bednarik Award.

=== Maxwell Award ===
Junior quarterback, Max Hall, was named on the preseason watch list for the Maxwell Award, given to the year's best college football player. Ty Detmer won the award at BYU in 1990.

=== Davey O'Brien Award ===
Max Hall is one of thirty-one quarterbacks named to the Davey O'Brien National Quarterback Award watch list. The award honors the nation's best quarterback. Jim McMahon, Steve Young, and Ty Detmer (twice) have all won the award. Honored four times, BYU has earned more Davey O' Brien Awards than any other team.

=== Walter Camp Award ===
Max Hall was one of 35 candidates named on the watch list for the Walter Camp Award for the Player-of-the-Year. In his first year as a starter in 2007, Hall was the nation's top sophomore quarterback in terms of passing yards. On the season, he completed 298-of-496 passes for 3,848 yards and 26 touchdowns.

=== John Mackey Award ===
Dennis Pitta is one of thirty tight ends named to the John Mackey Award preseason watch list.

=== Fred Biletnikoff Award ===
Junior Austin Collie is on the watch list for the Fred Biletnikoff Award.

=== Dick Butkus Award ===
Senior outside linebacker, David Nixon, is on the watch list for the Dick Butkus Award.

=== Doak Walker Award ===
Sophomore Harvey Unga is one of 42 of the nation's top college running backs named as a candidate for the Doak Walker Award. Luke Staley won the award at BYU in 2001.

=== All-America Team ===
Candidates for the All-America team are Ray Feinga, Dallas Reynolds, Jan Jorgensen, Max Hall, Harvey Unga, Dennis Pitta and Austin Collie. Fifty-three BYU players have earned 59 All-America citations including 11 consensus All-Americans and 21 Academic All-America citations. Harvey Unga earned Freshman All-America accolades last year.

=== All-Mountain West Conference Football Team (Pre-season) ===
First Team Offense: Max Hall, Harvey Unga, Austin Collie, Dennis Pitta, Ray Feinga, and Dallas Reynolds
First Team Defense: Jan Jorgensen
Second Team Offense:
Second Team Defense:
Offensive Player of the Year: Max Hall
Honorable Mention:
