= 2008 Las Vegas Bowl =

2008 Pioneer Las Vegas Bowl
- 17th Las Vegas Bowl
- Las Vegas Bowl logo
BYU Cougars	Arizona Wildcats
(10–2)	(7–5)
Mountain West	Pac-10
21	31
Head coach: Bronco Mendenhall	Head coach: Mike Stoops
AP / Coaches / BCS; 17 / 16 / 16
	1	2	3	4	Total
BYU	0	7	7	7	21
Arizona	7	3	14	7	31
- Date: December 20, 2008
- Season: 2008
- Stadium: Sam Boyd Stadium
- Location: Whitney, Nevada
- MVP: QB Willie Tuitama, Arizona
- National anthem: David Hasselhoff
- Referee: Jeff Flanagan (ACC)
- Attendance: 40,047
- Payout: US$1,000,000 per team

United States TV coverage
- Network: ESPN
- Announcers: Mike Patrick, Todd Blackledge, Holly Rowe
- Nielsen ratings: 2.2

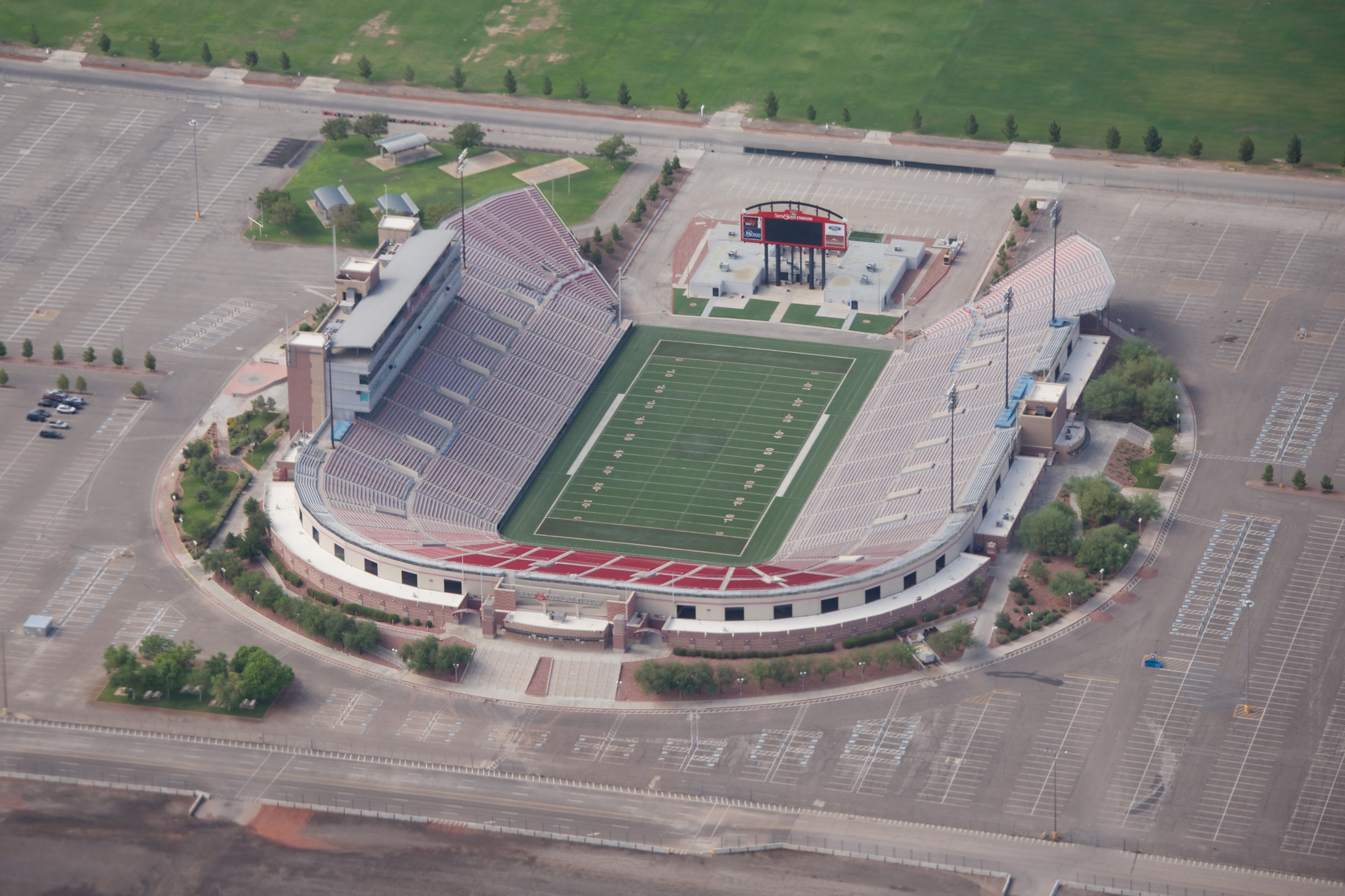
Sam Boyd Stadium in Whitney, Nevada, hosted the Las Vegas Bowl.

The 2008 Pioneer Las Vegas Bowl was an NCAA-sanctioned Division I FBS post-season college football bowl game between the BYU Cougars (third place overall in the Mountain West Conference) and the Arizona Wildcats (fifth pick from the Pacific-10 Conference). The game was played on December 20, 2008, starting at 5 p.m. PST at 40,000-seat off campus Sam Boyd Stadium of the University of Nevada, Las Vegas.

The Wildcats stunned the 16th ranked Cougars in the coldest Las Vegas Bowl in history, 31–21. It was televised on ESPN. The announcers were Mike Patrick and Todd Blackledge with the sideline reporting by Holly Rowe. Starting in 2001, the Las Vegas Bowl featured a matchup of teams from Mountain West and the Pac-10.

== Scoring summary ==
Scoring Play	Score
1st Quarter
Arizona - Nic Grigsby 1-yard TD run (Jason Bondzio kick), 6:23	Arizona 7-0
2nd Quarter
Arizona - Bondzio 31-yard FG, 9:21	Arizona 10-0
BYU - Harvey Unga 1-yard TD run (Mitch Payne kick), 6:50	Arizona 10-7
3rd Quarter
BYU - Andrew George 1-yard TD pass from Max Hall (Payne kick), 11:21	BYU 14-10
Arizona - Delashaun Dean 37-yard TD pass from Willie Tuitama (Bondzio kick), 7:07	Arizona 17-14
Arizona - Chris Gronkowski 24-yard TD pass from Tuitama (Bondzio kick), :25	Arizona 24-14
4th Quarter
Arizona - Tuitama 6-yard TD run (Bondzio kick), 6:09	Arizona 31-14
BYU - Hall 1-yard TD run (Payne kick), 3:38	Arizona 31-21

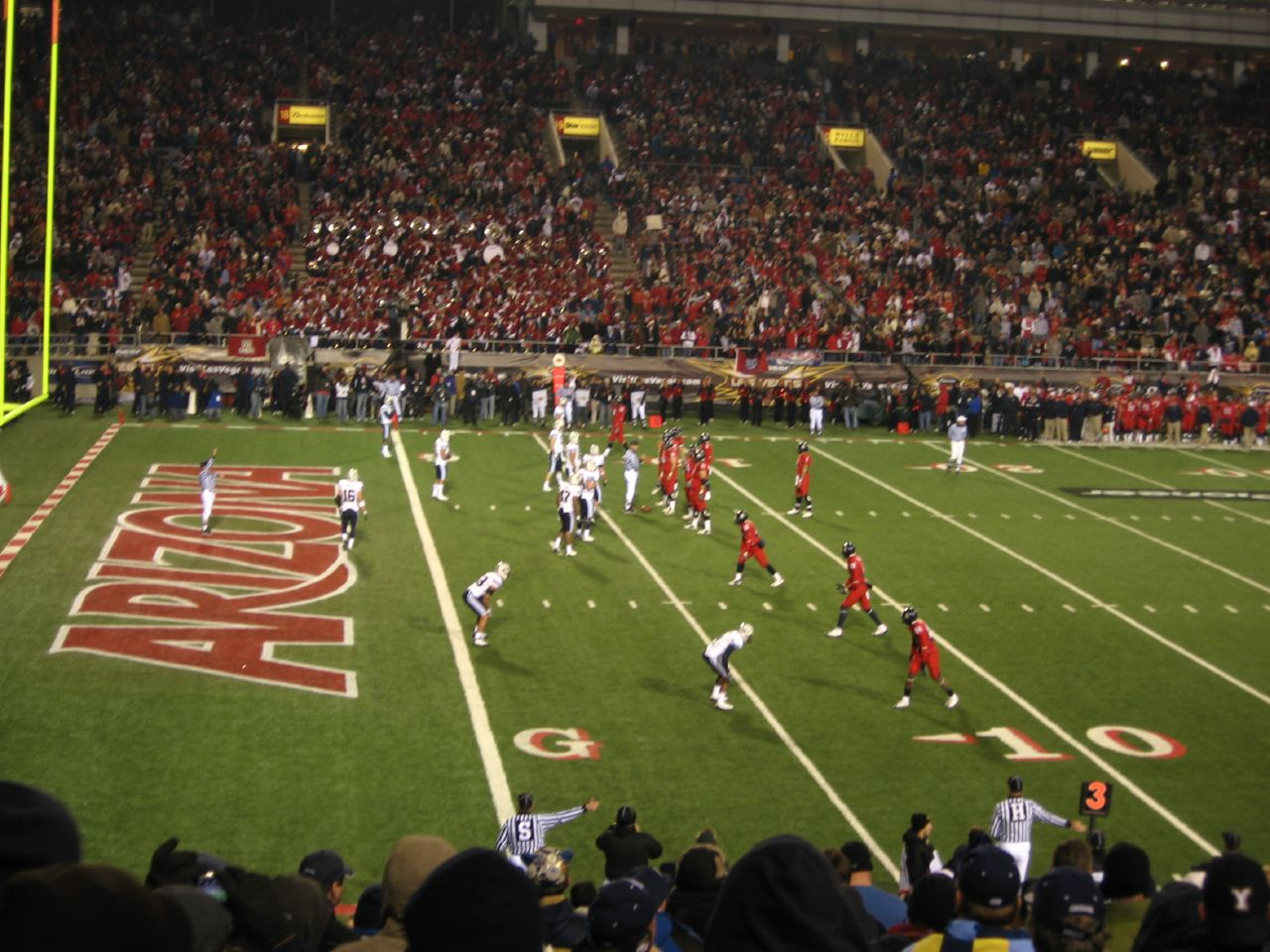
Arizona (in red) on offense during the game.
