= Jim Watson (sportscaster) =

Jim Watson is a sportscaster with Fox Sports and formerly with NBC Sports.

== Sportscasting career ==
=== NBC Sports Network ===
He called Gymnastics for the 2016 Rio Olympics. He called weightlifting for the 2012 London Olympics. He also calls water polo for Universal Sports. He has also served as a play-by-play announcer, anchor, reporter, and host for NBC Sports, Universal Sports, FOX Sports, ESPN3, Time Warner, and several other regional networks. He called Volleyball at the 2000 Summer Olympics.

=== Pac-12 Network and Fox Sports ===
Watson is also employed by the Pac-12 Network. There he calls football, basketball, baseball, gymnastics, swimming, and diving. In addition to Pac-12 sports, he has also covered golf, tennis, cross-country, track-and-field, softball, soccer, and water polo. Watson is the host and reporter for Dodgers Live, a pregame/postgame show for the Los Angeles Dodgers and calls beach volleyball for the Beach Volleyball World Tour. He was also the voice of the Los Angeles Galaxy for five years.

== Other sports ==
Watson has also covered motocross, snowboarding, wrestling, skiing, gymnastics, and weightlifting. He was also the host of Runnin' with the Pac.

=== Career Timeline ===
2005–present NBC Sports, Universal Sports, Fox Sports, The Mountain, and ESPN3 play-by-play, host, anchor, and reporter MLB, NBA, MLS, FIVB, Pac-10/Pac-12, Big West, CIF High School Sports 2003-2005 Fox Sports Northwest (Seattle) play-by-play, host, anchor, reporter MLB, NBA, NFL, WNBA, Pac-10, West Coast, Conference, WIAA(Washington) High School Sports 2003-2005 Fox Sports West (Los Angeles) play-by-play, anchor, host, reporter MLB, NBA, NHL, Pac-10, West Coast Conference, Big West Conference, CIF High School Sports

==== Olympics ====
2016: Gymnastics 2012: Weightlifting 2004: Indoor Volleyball 2000: Beach Volleyball

==== World Championships ====
2009-2012: NBC Sports, Universal Sports Beach Volleyball, Team Volleyball, Water Polo, snowboarding, Wrestling, Rowing

== Personal ==
He attended the University of Hawaii and the University of Southern California. He graduated from USC in 1989 with a Bachelor of Arts in Sports Information. He currently lives in Santa Monica, California.
