= Willie Tuitama =

American football player (born 1987)

No. 7
- Position: Quarterback

Personal information
- Born: January 13, 1987 (age 39); Stockton, California, U.S.
- Listed height: 6 ft 4 in (1.93 m)
- Listed weight: 215 lb (98 kg)

Career information
- High school: St. Mary's (Stockton)
- College: Arizona
- NFL draft: 2009: undrafted

Career history
- Nebraska Danger (2011–2012); San Antonio Talons (2012)*; Allen Wranglers (2012); Nebraska Danger (2013)*
- * Offseason or practice squad member only

Awards and highlights
- Second-team All-Pac-10 (2008); 2008 Las Vegas Bowl MVP
- Stats at ArenaFan.com

Willie Coonley Savea Tuitama (born January 13, 1987) is an American former football quarterback. He played college football for the Arizona Wildcats, and professionally in the Indoor Football League (IFL).

== Early life ==
Tuitama was born in Stockton, California. His father was originally from American Samoa; Tuitama and his sister were raised in the Church of Jesus Christ of Latter-day Saints. Tuitama attended St. Mary's High School. In 2005, he was ranked by SuperPrep All-America, its No. 16 quarterback. He received PrepStar All-America honors, as well as votes in the Long Beach Press-Telegram Best in the West Poll. Named Cal-Hi Sports third-team All-State.

As a Senior, he completed 158 of 254 passes for 2,734 yards, with 32 touchdowns, with only 7 interceptions. He led St. Mary's to California's Division I sectional championship, beating Nevada Union High School, 50–45 with Tuitama completing his last 11 passes. He had no incompletions in the second half. His team finished 13–1 and Tuitama led the league in passing yards, completing 17 of 23 passes for career highs of 312 yards and five touchdowns in his final prep game.

Following the year he was named a Max Emfinger top 30 dropback QB list with 4.5 stars, CollegeFootballnews.com No. 12 QB prospect nationally. He was a two-year letterman in football and once in baseball. He was also named a Rivals.com 4-star prospect.

== College career ==
Tuitama was offered scholarships from the Washington Huskies and Arizona Wildcats. He chose Arizona, where he majored in family studies and human development. During his tenure at Arizona he would set several school records, all of which were subsequently broken by Nick Foles, except career touchdowns (67) which they are tied.

== Professional career ==
Despite being named MVP of the 2008 Las Vegas Bowl, he went undrafted in the 2009 NFL draft.

Some analysis and media outlets reported his ill-timed DUI arrest in March 2009 and guilty plea in June of that year may have been considered a factor.

Tuitama began his professional career with the Nebraska Danger of the Indoor Football League.

Tuitama played for the Allen Wranglers for the later part of the 2012 season.

Tuitama re-signed with the Danger for the 2013 season, but did not report to training camp.
