= 2007–08 NCAA football bowl games =

College football postseason game series

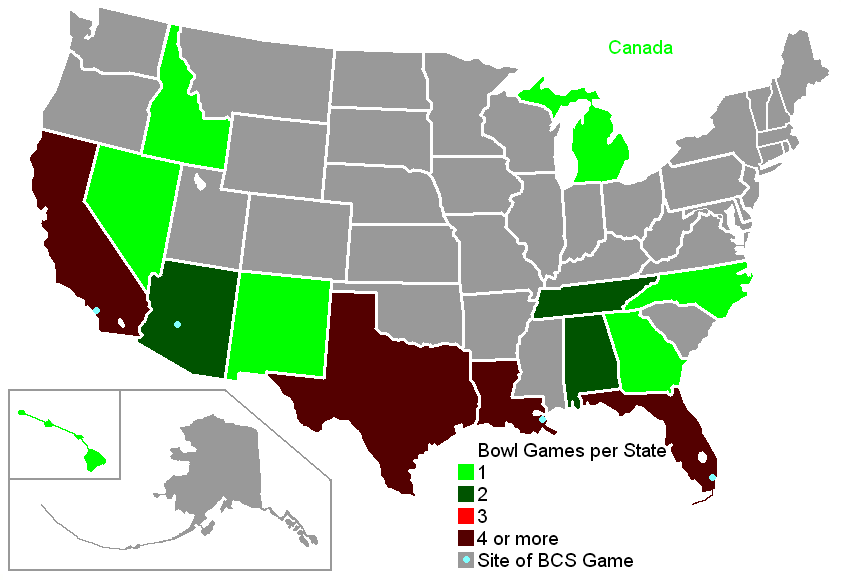
- Bowl sites by state
- Season: 2007
- Regular season: August 30–December 1
- Number of bowls: 32
- All-star games: 4
- Bowl games: December 20, 2007 – January 7, 2008 (not counting post-BCS all-star games)
- National Championship: 2008 BCS Championship Game
- Location of Championship: Louisiana Superdome, New Orleans, Louisiana
- Champions: LSU Tigers
- Bowl Challenge Cup winner: Mountain West
Bowl record by conference
Conference	Bowls	Record	Final AP poll
SEC	9	7–2 (0.778)	5
Big 12	8	5–3 (0.625)	5
Big Ten	8	3–5 (0.375)	4
ACC	8	2–6 (0.250)	3
Pac-10	6	4–2 (0.667)	4
Conference USA	6	2–4 (0.333)	0
Mountain West	5	4–1 (0.800)	1
Big East	5	3–2 (0.600)	2
WAC	4	1–3 (0.250)	1
MAC	3	0–3 (0.000)	0
Sun Belt	1	1–0 (1.000)	0
Independents	1	0–1 (0.000)	0

The 2007–08 NCAA football bowl games concluded the 2007 NCAA Division I FBS regular season in college football.

A total of 32 team-competitive plus four all-star postseason games were played. While bowl games had been the purview of only the very best teams for nearly a century, this was the second consecutive year that teams with non-winning seasons participated in bowl games. To fill the 64 available bowl slots from the 119 schools in the Bowl Subdivision, a total of seven teams (11% of all participants) with non-winning seasons participated in bowl games—all seven had a .500 (6-6) season.

== Selection of the teams ==
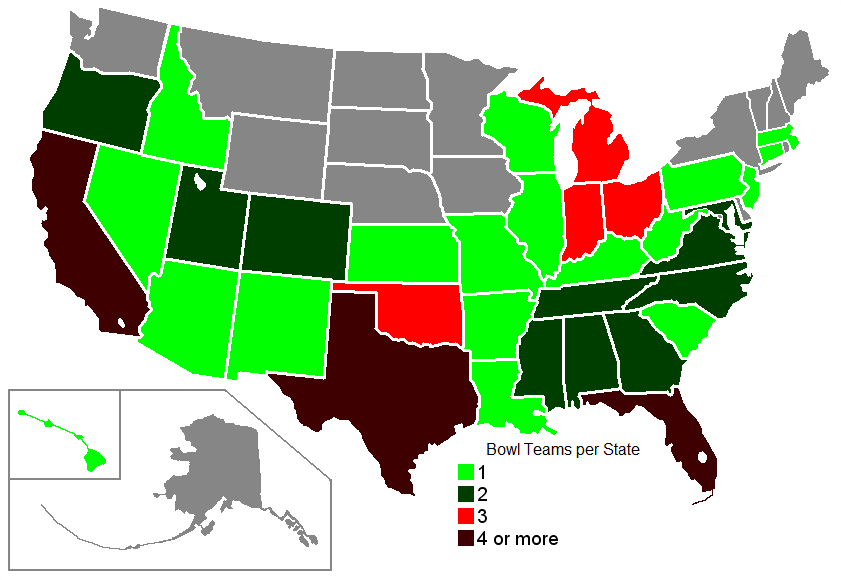
Number of bowl teams per state.

For the 2007–08 season, NCAA bylaws stipulated that any team that finished with at least a 6-6 overall regular season record can only be selected to fill a conference tie-in bowl slot once all other available conference teams are chosen.

The Big Ten had ten teams who finished with a 6-6 or better regular season record, but only were allocated six slots not including BCS-qualifying Ohio State and Illinois. As a result, Northwestern and Iowa who finished with a 6–6 record did not qualify for a bowl game. Other teams that were left out of the bowl games were Louisville of the Big East; and the SEC's South Carolina, despite the fact that their conference had two BCS-qualifying teams (LSU and Georgia). The MAC's Ohio and Sun Belt members Troy and Louisiana-Monroe also failed to receive invitations. The Troy Trojans (at 8–4) were the most notable absentee from the bowl games, losing their season finale to Florida Atlantic on the last day of the season.

In contrast, Mountain West members TCU was invited to the Texas Bowl as the Big 12 could not fill all of its slots, because not enough teams were left after Kansas was chosen as an at-large team to join conference champion Oklahoma.

Meanwhile, Miami (Ohio) went 6–7, losing the MAC Championship Game. Had the RedHawks won, they would have been eligible. As a result, the NCAA on April 30, 2008, later approved two new bowl games for the 2008–09 post season: The EagleBank Bowl (née Congressional Bowl), which will be played at RFK Stadium in Washington, D.C. will pit an ACC team against either Army or Navy, while the new St. Petersburg Bowl, to be played at Tropicana Field in the Florida City namesake will pit Conference USA and Big East schools against one another.

== Coaching changes ==
As a result of head coaching changes between the regular season and the bowl season, the following teams played their postseason contests with interim head coaches:

Team	Bowl	Season coach	Interim head coach	Result	2008 head coach
Arkansas	Cotton	Houston Nutt	Reggie Herring	Lost	Bobby Petrino
Georgia Tech	Humanitarian	Chan Gailey	Jon Tenuta	Lost	Paul Johnson
Houston	Texas	Art Briles	Chris Thurmond	Lost	Kevin Sumlin
Navy	Poinsettia	Paul Johnson	Ken Niumatalolo	Lost	same
Texas A&M	Alamo	Dennis Franchione	Gary Darnell	Lost	Mike Sherman
UCLA	Las Vegas	Karl Dorrell	DeWayne Walker	Lost	Rick Neuheisel
West Virginia	Fiesta	Rich Rodriguez	Bill Stewart	Won	Same

In addition, the following teams had coaches that either resigned or retired from their teams, but continued to work for their bowl games:

Team	Bowl	Current coach	Result	2008 head coach
Michigan	Capital One	Lloyd Carr	Won	Rich Rodriguez
Southern Mississippi	PapaJohns.com	Jeff Bower	Lost	Larry Fedora

=== Notes ===
- Nutt left Arkansas to take the same job at Mississippi.
- Briles left Houston to take the same job at Baylor.
- Johnson left the Naval Academy to take the same job at Georgia Tech.
- Rodriguez left West Virginia to take the same job at Michigan.

== Schedule ==
-	Non-BCS bowls				
Date	Time	Game	Site	Result	Ref.
Dec 20	9:00 p.m.	Poinsettia Bowl	Qualcomm Stadium; San Diego, CA	Utah 35, Navy 32	
Dec 21	8:00 p.m.	New Orleans Bowl	Louisiana Superdome; New Orleans, LA	Florida Atlantic 44, Memphis 27	
Dec 22	1:00 p.m.	PapaJohns.com Bowl	Legion Field; Birmingham, AL	No. 20 Cincinnati 31, Southern Miss 21	
Dec 22	4:30 p.m.	New Mexico Bowl	University Stadium; Albuquerque, NM	New Mexico 23, Nevada 0	
Dec 22	8:00 p.m.	Las Vegas Bowl	Sam Boyd Stadium; Las Vegas, NV	No. 19 BYU 17, UCLA 16	
Dec 23	8:00 p.m.	Hawaii Bowl	Aloha Stadium; Honolulu, HI	East Carolina 41, No. 24 Boise State 38	
Dec 26	7:30 p.m.	Motor City Bowl	Ford Field; Detroit, MI	Purdue 51, Central Michigan 48	
Dec 27	8:00 p.m.	Holiday Bowl	Qualcomm Stadium; San Diego, CA	No. 17 Texas 52, No. 12 Arizona State 34	
Dec 28	5:00 p.m.	Champs Sports Bowl	Florida Citrus Bowl; Orlando, FL	No. 14 Boston College 24, Michigan State 21	
Dec 28	8:00 p.m.	Texas Bowl	Reliant Stadium; Houston, TX	TCU 20, Houston 13	
Dec 28	8:30 p.m.	Emerald Bowl	AT&T Park; San Francisco, CA	Oregon State 21, Maryland 14	
Dec 29	1:00 p.m.	Meineke Car Care Bowl	Bank of America Stadium; Charlotte, NC	Wake Forest 24, Connecticut 10	
Dec 29	4:30 p.m.	Liberty Bowl	Liberty Bowl Memorial Stadium; Memphis, TN	Mississippi State 10, UCF 3	
Dec 29	8:00 p.m.	Alamo Bowl	Alamodome; San Antonio, TX	Penn State 24, Texas A&M 17	
Dec 30	8:00 p.m.	Independence Bowl	Independence Stadium; Shreveport, LA	Alabama 30, Colorado 24	
Dec 31	12:30 p.m.	Armed Forces Bowl	Amon G. Carter Stadium; Fort Worth, TX	California 42, Air Force 36	
Dec 31	2:00 p.m.	Sun Bowl	Sun Bowl; El Paso, TX	Oregon 56, No. 23 South Florida 21	
Dec 31	2:00 p.m.	Humanitarian Bowl	Bronco Stadium; Boise, ID	Fresno State 40, Georgia Tech 28	
Dec 31	4:00 p.m.	Music City Bowl	LP Field; Nashville, TN	Kentucky 35, Florida State 28	
Dec 31	5:30 p.m.	Insight Bowl	Sun Devil Stadium; Tempe, AZ	Oklahoma State 49, Indiana 33	
Dec 31	7:30 p.m.	Chick-fil-A Bowl	Georgia Dome; Atlanta, GA	No. 22 Auburn 23, No. 15 Clemson 20	
Jan 1	11:00 a.m.	Outback Bowl	Raymond James Stadium; Tampa, FL	No. 16 Tennessee 21, No. 18 Wisconsin 17	
Jan 1	11:30 a.m.	Cotton Bowl	Cotton Bowl; Dallas, TX	No. 7 Missouri 38, No. 25 Arkansas 7	
Jan 1	12:00 p.m.	Gator Bowl	Jacksonville Municipal Stadium; Jacksonville, FL	Texas Tech 31, No. 21 Virginia 28	
Jan 1	1:00 p.m.	Capital One Bowl	Florida Citrus Bowl; Orlando, FL	Michigan 41, No. 9 Florida 35	
Jan 5	12:00 p.m.	International Bowl	Rogers Centre; Toronto, Canada	Rutgers 52, Ball State 30	
Jan 6	8:00 p.m.	GMAC Bowl	Ladd–Peebles Stadium; Mobile, AL	Tulsa 63, Bowling Green 7	
BCS bowls
Date	Time	Game	Site	Result	Ref.
Jan 1	4:30 p.m.	Rose Bowl	Rose Bowl; Pasadena, CA	No. 6 USC 49, No. 13 Illinois 17	
Jan 1	8:30 p.m.	Sugar Bowl	Louisiana Superdome; New Orleans, LA	No. 4 Georgia 41, No. 10 Hawaii 10	
Jan 2	8:00 p.m.	Fiesta Bowl	University of Phoenix Stadium; Glendale, AZ	No. 11 West Virginia 48, No. 3 Oklahoma 28	
Jan 3	8:00 p.m.	Orange Bowl	Dolphin Stadium; Miami Gardens, FL	No. 8 Kansas 24, No. 5 Virginia Tech 21	
Jan 7	8:00 p.m.	BCS National Championship Game	Louisiana Superdome; New Orleans, LA	No. 2 LSU 38, No. 1 Ohio State 24	
Rankings from AP Poll released prior to the game. All times are in Eastern Time.

== Non-BCS Bowls ==
NOTE: Rankings used are the final regular season BCS Rankings whenever noted, all payouts are in US Dollars, season records are prior to the bowl game.

=== Poinsettia Bowl ===
- Utah (8–4) 35, Navy (8–4) 32

In the first bowl game of the season, the San Diego County Credit Union Poinsettia Bowl on December 20 at Qualcomm Stadium in San Diego, California, the Utes of the University of Utah from the Mountain West Conference defeated the independent (no conference affiliation) United States Naval Academy Midshipmen, 35–32. Each team got $750,000 payouts, as the Utes' share was divided amongst the members of their conference, while Navy kept the entire amount.

=== New Orleans Bowl ===
- Florida Atlantic (7–5) 44, Memphis (7–5) 27

At the R+L Carriers New Orleans Bowl held December 21 at the Louisiana Superdome in New Orleans, Louisiana, the Florida Atlantic University Owls of the Sun Belt Conference, in their first FBS appearance as conference champions, defeated the University of Memphis Tigers from Conference USA, 44–27. Both conferences got $325,000 in payouts in the first of three post-season games to be played in the Crescent City.

=== PapaJohns.com Bowl ===
- (22) Cincinnati (9–3) 31, Southern Miss (7–5) 21

The Papajohns.com Bowl at Legion Field in Birmingham, Alabama on December 22 featured the University of Cincinnati Bearcats of the Big East Conference and the University of Southern Mississippi Golden Eagles of Conference USA. This was the last game for 17-year coach Jeff Bower of Southern Miss who made his coaching debut at Southern Miss at Legion Field against Alabama. However, the Bearcats won the game 31–21, earning their first 10 win season in over five decades. Both conferences were paid $300,000 for the contest.

=== New Mexico Bowl ===
- New Mexico (8–4) 23, Nevada (6–6) 0

The New Mexico Bowl on December 22 was contested by the University of New Mexico Lobos of the Mountain West and the University of Nevada, Reno Wolf Pack of the Western Athletic Conference. On their home field of University Stadium in Albuquerque, New Mexico, the Lobos shutout the Wolf Pack, 23–0, to win their first postseason win since 1961. For the Wolf Pack, it was the first shutout they had since 1980. Both conferences got a stipend of $750,000 for each school's participation in the season's fourth bowl game.

=== Las Vegas Bowl ===
- (17) Brigham Young (10–2) 17, UCLA (6–6) 16

The Pioneer Las Vegas Bowl was played on December 22 at the University of Nevada, Las Vegas's Sam Boyd Stadium in Whitney, Nevada. In the only regular season rematch of the season, the Cougars of Brigham Young University, the Mountain West Conference champions, escaped with a 17–16 victory over the University of California, Los Angeles Bruins of the Pacific-10 Conference. The conferences each divided up checks for $1 million as receipt for their teams playing. The game was not decided until Eathyn Manumaluena blocked Kai Forbath's game-winning 28-yard field goal attempt as time expired, avenging a 27–17 loss back on September 8 at UCLA's home field, the Rose Bowl in Pasadena, California.

=== Hawaii Bowl ===
- East Carolina (7–5) 41, (24) Boise State (10–2) 38

The Sheraton Hawaii Bowl at Aloha Stadium in Honolulu, Hawaii, saw the East Carolina University Pirates of Conference USA defeat the WAC's Boise State University Broncos, 41–38. Boise State came back from a 38–14 third-quarter deficit, tying the game when Marty Tadman returned a Pirates fumble for a touchdown with 1:25 left. The Pirates answered with a game-ending 34-yard field goal from Ben Hartman to win their first bowl game since 2000. The conferences of both schools received a check for $750,000 apiece.

The Hawaii Warriors, the traditional Hawaii Bowl team as per its "Hawaii guarantee" agreement, did not play in this season's contest since they qualified for a BCS bowl. Additionally, the game was held on December 23 instead of the traditional annual date of December 24 (Christmas Eve) due to ESPN's commitments to broadcast a Monday Night Football game between the Denver Broncos and the San Diego Chargers.

=== Motor City Bowl ===
- Purdue (7–5) 51, Central Michigan (8–5) 48

The Motor City Bowl was played at Ford Field in Detroit, Michigan on December 26. The Big Ten representatives, the Purdue University Boilermakers, withstood a furious comeback from the MAC champion Central Michigan University Chippewas to win on a game-ending field goal, 51–48. The Chips came back from a 34–13 halftime deficit to tie it with 1:09 to play in regulation. Purdue then drove to the CMU 23-yard line, where kicker Chris Summers kicked a 40-yard field goal to end the game. Purdue quarterback Curtis Painter threw 35-54 for three touchdowns, two interceptions, and a Motor City Bowl record 546 yards, which was also the fourth-highest passing yard total in post-season history. His counterpart, CMU quarterback Dan LeFevour, accounted for 406 (292 passing, 114 rushing) of CMU's 435 total yards and all 6 of his team's touchdowns (4 passing, 2 rushing). As for Butch Jones, the CMU coach, who made his head coaching debut in last year's contest against Middle Tennessee State, reports had him looking into the vacant West Virginia job with a second interview scheduled after this game, but that never materialized. The conferences each received $750,000 for their teams' participation.

=== Champs Sports Bowl ===
- (14) Boston College (10–3) 24, Michigan State (7–5) 21

The Boston College Eagles of the ACC narrowly defeated the Michigan State University Spartans, 24–21, in the Champs Sports Bowl on December 28 at the Citrus Bowl in Orlando, Florida, the first of two post-season contests played there. The Eagles entered the game after losing the ACC Championship Game. Meanwhile, the Spartans, who were not expected to even play in a bowl, barely qualified for a bowl game after upsetting Penn State in the Land Grant Trophy game. Each conference received a stipend of $2.2 million for their teams.

=== Texas Bowl ===
- TCU (7–5) 20, Houston (8–4) 13

The Texas Bowl was played on December 28, when the Texas Christian University Horned Frogs, representing the Mountain West Conference, played Conference USA's University of Houston Cougars in a pseudo home game at Reliant Stadium in Houston, Texas, not far from the Astrodome where the Cougars played until moving back on campus to Robertson Stadium in 1999. The Horned Frogs won the game, 20–13, in their first meeting since the disbanding of the Southwest Conference. Because the Big 12 failed to meet the minimum of eight schools for bowl eligibility (and a larger payout), the conferences received $612,500.

=== Emerald Bowl ===
- Oregon State (8–4) 21, Maryland (6–6) 14

In another game played on December 28, the Pac-10's Oregon State University Beavers scored the game's final touchdown in the fourth quarter for a 21–14 victory against the ACC's University of Maryland, College Park Terrapins in the Emerald Bowl at AT&T Park in San Francisco, California, which normally serves as the home to the Major League Baseball team San Francisco Giants. The conferences involved received a $750,000 payment from the organizers.

=== Meineke Car Care Bowl ===
- Wake Forest (8–4) 24, (25) UConn (9–3) 10

The ACC's Wake Forest University Demon Deacons, defeated the University of Connecticut Huskies from the Big East, 24–10, on December 29 in the Meineke Car Care Bowl at Charlotte, North Carolina's Bank of America Stadium. Each conference got a $750,000 payment for the schools' involvement.

=== Liberty Bowl ===
- Mississippi State (7–5) 10, Central Florida (10–3) 3

The AutoZone Liberty Bowl was held on December 29 at the self-named Memorial Stadium in Memphis, Tennessee. The Conference USA champions, the University of Central Florida Golden Knights, lost in a defensive battle to the SEC representatives, the Mississippi State University Bulldogs, 10–3. The conferences received a $1.7 million check for the schools to divide amongst themselves.

=== Alamo Bowl ===
- Penn State (8–4) 24, Texas A&M (7–5) 17

The December 29 Valero Alamo Bowl at the Alamodome in San Antonio, Texas saw the Big Ten's Nittany Lions from the Pennsylvania State University prevail over the Big 12's Texas A&M University Aggies by a score of 24–17 to finish in the nation ranked 25th. This was Penn State head coach Joe Paterno's 500th game. Texas A&M was led by interim coach Gary Darnell, after Dennis Franchione was excused, mired in scandal. Both schools earned a $2.2 million check for their conferences. This was the first season that Valero Energy was the title sponsor of the game, which was without one a season earlier after MasterCard International withdrew after the 2006 contest.

=== Independence Bowl ===
- Alabama (6–6) 30, Colorado (6–6) 24

The PetroSun Independence Bowl in Shreveport, Louisiana at Independence Stadium on December 30 saw the SEC's University of Alabama Crimson Tide score 27 first half points against the Big 12's University of Colorado at Boulder Buffaloes. Alabama then prevented a late Colorado comeback to hold on to win, 30–24. Each conference received a payout of $1.1 million.

=== Armed Forces Bowl ===
- California (6–6) 42, Air Force (9–3) 36

The Bell Helicopters Armed Forces Bowl was played on December 31 at Amon G. Carter Stadium on the campus of Texas Christian University in Fort Worth, Texas. The Pac 10's University of California, Berkeley Golden Bears defeated the United States Air Force Academy Falcons from the Mountain West, 42–36. The conferences received $750,000 as a receipt for the teams participating.

=== Humanitarian Bowl ===
- Fresno State (8–4) 40, Georgia Tech (7–5) 28

Another contest on December 31 was the Roady's Humanitarian Bowl at Bronco Stadium on the campus of Boise State University in Boise, Idaho, best known for its blue "Smurf Turf". The former MPC Bowl reverted to its original "Humanitarian Bowl" name after Roady's Truck Stops replaced Micron Technology as its sponsor. In this season's game, the WAC's California State University, Fresno Bulldogs beat the Georgia Institute of Technology (more commonly known as Georgia Tech) Yellow Jackets from the ACC, 40–28. Each conference received a $750,000 payout to be divided among fellow members.

=== Music City Bowl ===
- Kentucky (7–5) 35, Florida State (7–5) 28

The Gaylord Hotels Music City Bowl at LP Field in Nashville, Tennessee was held on December 31. The University of Kentucky Wildcats made their second consecutive Music City Bowl appearance, having defeated Clemson, coached by Tommy Bowden during the 2006–07 season. This year, they played another ACC team coached by a Bowden, this time the Florida State University Seminoles of father Bobby. The Seminoles came into the game missing thirty-four players (very few being starters or second stringers) due to injuries, violations of team rules, and suspensions stemming from a large cheating scandal. The Wildcats won 35–28 to finish 8–5 for the second straight year, giving them back-to-back bowl wins for the first time since 1952. Also for the second straight year, Wildcats quarterback André Woodson was the game's MVP. Each conference got a payment of $1.5 million to be divided amongst their members.

=== Insight Bowl ===
- Oklahoma State (6–6) 49, Indiana (7–5) 33

At the Insight Bowl played at Sun Devil Stadium on the campus of Arizona State University in the Phoenix, Arizona suburb of Tempe on December 31, the Oklahoma State University-Stillwater Cowboys from the Big 12 beat the Indiana University Hoosiers of the Big Ten, 49–33. In spite of the loss, IU fulfilled a dream for their late head coach Terry Hoeppner before his untimely passing earlier this year to play one more game for a total of "13", the team's motto for the 2007 season. As payment, the participating conferences each received $1.2 million.

=== International Bowl ===
- Rutgers (7–5) 52, Ball State (7–5) 30

The second International Bowl was contested at Rogers Centre in Toronto, Canada on January 5, 2008. The Big East's Rutgers University Scarlet Knights defeated the MAC's Ball State University Cardinals, 52–30. Rutgers running back, Ray Rice rushed for 280 yards and four touchdowns to earn MVP honors. The conferences involved each got $750,000 to split between their schools.

=== GMAC Bowl ===
- Tulsa (9–4) 63, Bowling Green (8–4) 7

The GMAC Bowl was played in Mobile, Alabama's Ladd–Peebles Stadium on January 6, 2008. The Conference USA's Golden Hurricane of University of Tulsa dominated the Bowling Green State University Falcons from the Mid-American Conference, 63–7. The 63 points posted by the Hurricane was the most since beating Drake University, 70–7 in 1970. In addition, the 56-point margin of victory set an NCAA record for most lopsided win in any bowl, bettering Alabama's 55-point blowout of Syracuse, 61–6, in the 1953 Orange Bowl. The bowl paid their leagues $750,000 apiece for their teams.

== New Year's Day and other prestigious non-BCS Bowl Games ==
The following seven bowl games are either held traditionally on January 1 or have featured large payouts. In addition, a majority of these games are aired on broadcast television networks such as CBS, ABC or Fox instead of cable networks like ESPN, ESPN2 or NFL Network.

=== Holiday Bowl ===
- (19) Texas (9–3) 52, (11) Arizona State (10–2) 34

The Pacific Life Holiday Bowl was played on December 27 at Qualcomm Stadium in San Diego, California, which also hosted the Poinsettia Bowl a week earlier. The University of Texas at Austin Longhorns, the representatives of the Big 12, coached by Mack Brown, defeated the Pac-10's Arizona State University Sun Devils under the leadership of Dennis Erickson, 52–34. Each conference will get a $2.2 million payout as receipt of the schools playing.

=== Sun Bowl ===
- Oregon (8–4) 56, (21) South Florida (9–3) 21

The Brut Sun Bowl was contested on December 31 at the eponymous named stadium in El Paso, Texas on the campus of the University of Texas at El Paso, pitting the Pac 10's University of Oregon Ducks and the Big East's University of South Florida Bulls. After a first half that saw both teams tied at one point at 11–11, the Ducks scored 38 points in the second half to clinch a 56–21 win. Both schools netted a payout of $1.9 million for their conference coffers.

=== Chick-fil-A Bowl ===
- (23) Auburn (8–4) 23, (15) Clemson (9–3) 20 (OT)

The Chick-fil-A Bowl was played on December 31 in the Georgia Dome in Atlanta between two teams with the same moniker: Clemson University from the ACC and Auburn University from the SEC, both referred to as "Tigers." During the contest, Auburn unveiled a new spread offense implemented by new offensive coordinator Tony Franklin. Despite an early bowl-record 83-yard touchdown run by Clemson's C. J. Spiller, Auburn was able to record a 23–20 victory when freshman backup quarterback Kodi Burns ended the first overtime game in Chick-fil-A Bowl history with a seven-yard walk-off touchdown. The payouts were $3.25 million for the higher priority selection from the ACC and $2.4 million for the SEC representative. The Chick-fil-A Bowl was the highest-rated ESPN-broadcast bowl game of the 2007–2008 season, and the highest rated in the game's history.

=== Outback Bowl ===
- (16) Tennessee (9–4) 21, (18) Wisconsin (9–3) 17

In the first of two Big Ten-SEC matchups played on New Years' Day, the University of Tennessee Volunteers defeated the Badgers from the University of Wisconsin–Madison, 21–17, in the Outback Bowl at Tampa, Florida's Raymond James Stadium. Both conferences were guaranteed a $3 million paycheck.

=== Cotton Bowl Classic ===
- (6) Missouri (11–2) 38, Arkansas (8–4) 7

Despite having one of their most successful seasons in school history, the University of Missouri-Columbia Tigers were only selected to play at the non-BCS AT&T Cotton Bowl Classic on January 1 after suffering their only two losses for the year to Oklahoma (the latter in the Big 12 Championship Game). Mizzou then blew out their bowl game opponent, the University of Arkansas Razorbacks from the SEC, 38–7. The conferences received $3 million apiece. Tigers running back Tony Temple set game records with 281 yards on the ground and four touchdowns while Razorback runner Darren McFadden was limited to 102 yards.

This was the second-to-last Cotton Bowl Classic to be played at the namesake stadium in Dallas, Texas; the game will move to nearby Cowboys Stadium in Arlington beginning 2010.

=== Gator Bowl ===
- Texas Tech (8–4) 31, (20) Virginia (9–3) 28

The Big 12's Texas Tech University Red Raiders defeated the ACC's University of Virginia Cavaliers, 31–28, in the Konica Minolta Gator Bowl at Jacksonville, Florida's Municipal Stadium on January 1. Alex Trlica kicked the game-winning 41-yard field goal with :07 left in the game. The kick capped off a 17-point burst by Texas Tech in the final 3:31 to come from behind. Red Raiders quarterback Graham Harrell completed 44 out of 69 passes for 407 yards and three touchdowns. Cavaliers running back Mikell Simpson scored on a 96-yard touchdown run, the longest run in NCAA bowl history, in the losing effort. A $5.5 million payout awaited both participating conferences. Konica Minolta replaced Toyota as title sponsor as of this game.

=== Capital One Bowl ===
- Michigan (8–4) 41, (12) Florida (9–3) 35

In his final game, head coach Lloyd Carr's University of Michigan Wolverines of the Big Ten upset the University of Florida Gators led by Heisman Trophy winning sophomore quarterback Tim Tebow, 41–35 at the Capital One Bowl on January 1. The game was the second bowl contest held at the Citrus Bowl in Orlando, Florida during the 2007–08 bowl season. The participating conferences received the largest payout of any non-BCS game at $4.25 million per conference.

== Bowl Championship Series ==
Each Bowl Championship Series (BCS) game had a payout of between $14 million and $17 million to each conference. Three conferences – the Big Ten, the Big 12 and the SEC – earned a second berth as a result of at-large selections. In those cases, an additional $6 million was given to be divided between all schools in those conferences. Because the Hawaii earned an at-large berth in the Sugar Bowl, the MAC, WAC, Mountain West, Conference USA and Sun Belt conferences divided $18 million for their schools.

=== Rose Bowl Game ===
- (7) Southern California (10–2) 49, (13) Illinois (9–3) 17

In the first BCS Game on January 1, 2008, the University of Southern California Trojans defeated the University of Illinois at Urbana–Champaign Fighting Illini, 49–17 in the Rose Bowl Game presented by Citi at self-named facility in Pasadena, California. The Trojans victory one of the most lopsided wins in the history of the game often referred to as "The Granddaddy of Them All". Quarterback John David Booty was named offensive MVP of the game.

The Trojans were Pac-10 champions for the 6th straight year, overcoming an upset loss by Stanford in October at home as a 40-point favorite. Meanwhile, the Fighting Illini finished as the only other team from the Big Ten in the regular season Top 14 BCS rankings. After they beat Ohio State University Buckeyes in one of the biggest upsets of the regular season, Illinois finished in second place in the Big Ten, and qualified for the Rose Bowl after the conference champion Buckeyes earned a berth in the BCS National Championship Game.

=== Sugar Bowl ===
- (5) Georgia (10–2) 41, (10) Hawaii (12–0) 10

The Allstate Sugar Bowl on January 1, the second bowl contest played at the Louisiana Superdome in New Orleans, pitted the University of Hawaii at Manoa Warriors against the University of Georgia Bulldogs. The Warriors completed an unbeaten regular season with the "run and shoot offense" of head coach June Jones, clinching the WAC championship. The Bulldogs finished with a 10–2 overall record, tied for first place in the SEC Eastern Division (UGA did not qualify for the SEC Championship Game, however, because they lost a head-to-head tiebreaker to the Tennessee Volunteers). UGA took advantage of errors by Hawaii en route to an easy 41–10 victory. Almost a week later, Jones resigned to take the job at Southern Methodist University.

=== Fiesta Bowl ===
- (9) West Virginia (10–2) 48, (4) Oklahoma (11–2) 28

The Tosititos Fiesta Bowl was played at Glendale, Arizona's University of Phoenix Stadium on January 2, 2008. The West Virginia University Mountaineers upset the Big 12 champion University of Oklahoma Sooners, 48–28.

The Mountaineers entered the game as the Big East champions, but were spoiled on the last day of the regular season in the Backyard Brawl against the University of Pittsburgh as the number two team in the rankings. The Sooners were coming off a win over Missouri in the Big 12 Championship Game.

The loss was the fourth straight in the BCS and second consecutive in the Fiesta Bowl for head coach Bob Stoops's Sooners, who lost a memorable game a year earlier to Boise State. Bill Stewart, who led the Mountaineers after Rich Rodriguez bolted for Michigan after the regular season, was rewarded for his work in this game by being named permanent head coach for the 2008 season.

=== Orange Bowl ===
- (8) Kansas (11–1) 24, (3) Virginia Tech (11–2) 21

On January 3, 2008, while much of the country was focused on the first major preliminary event of the 2008 Presidential Election campaign in the US, the Iowa caucuses, the Big 12's University of Kansas Jayhawks defeated the ACC Champion Virginia Polytechnic Institute and State University (Virginia Tech) Hokies, 24–21, at the FedEx Orange Bowl in Miami Gardens, Florida's Dolphin Stadium.

=== 2008 BCS National Championship Game ===
- (2) LSU (11–2) 38, (1) Ohio State (11–1) 24

The 2008 Allstate BCS National Championship Game was the third post-season contest at New Orleans' Louisiana Superdome and was played on January 7, 2008. The SEC Champion Louisiana State University Tigers overcame a 10–0 deficit to beat the Big Ten Champion Ohio State University Buckeyes, 38–24, in front of a crowd of 79,651. The LSU Tigers thus became the first team to win two BCS titles and the first to win a national championship with two losses (both in triple overtime to Kentucky and Arkansas).

== Conference Bowl records ==
=== Bowl Challenge Cup ===
Conference	Bowl Appearances					Final Poll Top 25			
Conference	#	Record	%	Winners	Losers	#	Teams	AP Rank	CP Rank
Sun Belt^{*}	1	1–0	1.000	Florida Atlantic		0	none		
Sun Belt^{*}	Head-to-head record: 1-0 vs. C-USA								
Mountain West^{†}	5	4–1	0.800	BYU; New Mexico; TCU; Utah	Air Force	1	BYU	#14	#14t
Mountain West^{†}	Head-to-head record: 1-0 vs. Independents, 1-0 vs. WAC, 1-1 vs. Pac-10, 1-0 vs. C-USA								
Southeastern	9	7–2	0.778	LSU; Georgia; Tennessee; Auburn; Alabama; Kentucky; Mississippi State	Florida; Arkansas	5	LSU	#1	#1
Southeastern	9	7–2	0.778	LSU; Georgia; Tennessee; Auburn; Alabama; Kentucky; Mississippi State	Florida; Arkansas	5	Georgia	#2	#3
Southeastern	9	7–2	0.778	LSU; Georgia; Tennessee; Auburn; Alabama; Kentucky; Mississippi State	Florida; Arkansas	5	Tennessee	#12	#12
Southeastern	9	7–2	0.778	LSU; Georgia; Tennessee; Auburn; Alabama; Kentucky; Mississippi State	Florida; Arkansas	5	Florida	#13	#16
Southeastern	9	7–2	0.778	LSU; Georgia; Tennessee; Auburn; Alabama; Kentucky; Mississippi State	Florida; Arkansas	5	Auburn	#15	#14t
Southeastern	Head-to-head record: 1-0 vs. C-USA, 1-1 vs. Big 12, 2-0 vs. ACC, 2-1 vs. Big Ten, 1-0 vs. WAC								
Pac-10	6	4–2	0.667	USC; Oregon; Oregon State; California	Arizona State; UCLA	4	USC	#3	#2
Pac-10	6	4–2	0.667	USC; Oregon; Oregon State; California	Arizona State; UCLA	4	Arizona State	#16	#13
Pac-10	6	4–2	0.667	USC; Oregon; Oregon State; California	Arizona State; UCLA	4	Oregon	#23	#24
Pac-10	6	4–2	0.667	USC; Oregon; Oregon State; California	Arizona State; UCLA	4	Oregon State	#25	NR
Pac-10	Head-to-head record: 1-0 vs. ACC, 1-0 vs. Big East, 1-1 vs. Mountain West, 0-1 vs. Big 12, 1-0 vs. Big Ten								
Big 12	8	5–3	0.625	Missouri; Kansas; Texas; Texas Tech; Oklahoma State	Oklahoma; Colorado; Texas A&M	5	Missouri	#4	#5
Big 12	8	5–3	0.625	Missouri; Kansas; Texas; Texas Tech; Oklahoma State	Oklahoma; Colorado; Texas A&M	5	Kansas	#7	#7
Big 12	8	5–3	0.625	Missouri; Kansas; Texas; Texas Tech; Oklahoma State	Oklahoma; Colorado; Texas A&M	5	Oklahoma	#8	#8
Big 12	8	5–3	0.625	Missouri; Kansas; Texas; Texas Tech; Oklahoma State	Oklahoma; Colorado; Texas A&M	5	Texas	#10t	#10
Big 12	8	5–3	0.625	Missouri; Kansas; Texas; Texas Tech; Oklahoma State	Oklahoma; Colorado; Texas A&M	5	Texas Tech	#22	#23
Big 12	Head-to-head record: 1-0 vs. Pac-10, 1-1 vs. Big Ten, 1-1 vs. SEC, 2-0 vs. ACC, 0-1 vs. Big East								
Big East	5	3–2	0.600	West Virginia; Cincinnati; Rutgers	South Florida; UConn	2	West Virginia	#6	#6
Big East	5	3–2	0.600	West Virginia; Cincinnati; Rutgers	South Florida; UConn	2	Cincinnati	#17	#20
Big East	Head-to-head record: 1-0 vs. C-USA, 0-1 vs. ACC, 0-1 vs. Pac 10, 1-0 vs. Big 12, 1-0 vs. MAC								
Big Ten	8	3–5	0.375	Michigan; Penn State; Purdue	Ohio State; Illinois; Wisconsin; Michigan State; Indiana	5	Ohio State	#5	#4
Big Ten	8	3–5	0.375	Michigan; Penn State; Purdue	Ohio State; Illinois; Wisconsin; Michigan State; Indiana	5	Michigan	#18	#19
Big Ten	8	3–5	0.375	Michigan; Penn State; Purdue	Ohio State; Illinois; Wisconsin; Michigan State; Indiana	5	Illinois	#20	#18
Big Ten	8	3–5	0.375	Michigan; Penn State; Purdue	Ohio State; Illinois; Wisconsin; Michigan State; Indiana	5	Wisconsin	#24	#21
Big Ten	8	3–5	0.375	Michigan; Penn State; Purdue	Ohio State; Illinois; Wisconsin; Michigan State; Indiana	5	Penn State	NR	#25
Big Ten	Head-to-head record: 1-0 vs. MAC, 1-1 vs. Big 12, 0-1 vs. ACC, 1-2 vs. SEC, 0-1 vs. Pac-10								
Conference USA	6	2–4	0.333	East Carolina; Tulsa	Central Florida; Houston; Memphis; Southern Mississippi	0	none		
Conference USA	Head-to-head record: 1-0 vs. WAC, 0-1 vs. Sun Belt, 0-1 vs. Big East, 0-1 vs. SEC, 0-1 vs. MWC, 1-0 vs. MAC								
ACC	8	2–6	0.250	Boston College; Wake Forest	Virginia Tech; Clemson; Virginia; Florida State; Georgia Tech; Maryland	3	Virginia Tech	#9	#9
ACC	8	2–6	0.250	Boston College; Wake Forest	Virginia Tech; Clemson; Virginia; Florida State; Georgia Tech; Maryland	3	Boston College	#10t	#11
ACC	8	2–6	0.250	Boston College; Wake Forest	Virginia Tech; Clemson; Virginia; Florida State; Georgia Tech; Maryland	3	Clemson	#21	#22
ACC	Head-to-head record: 1-0 vs. Big 10, 1-0 vs. Big East, 0-1 vs. Pac 10, 0-2 vs. SEC, 0-1 vs. WAC, 0-2 vs. Big 12								
Western Athletic	4	1–3	0.250	Fresno State	Hawaii; Boise State; Nevada	1	Hawaii	#19	#17
Western Athletic	Head-to-head record: 1-0 vs. ACC, 0-1 vs. Mountain West, 0-1 vs. C-USA, 0-1 vs. SEC								
Independents	1	0–1	0.000		Navy	0	none		
Independents	Head-to-head record: 0-1 vs. Mountain West								
Mid-American	3	0–3	0.000		Ball State; Bowling Green; Central Michigan	0	none		
Mid-American	Head-to-head record: 0-1 vs. Big Ten, 0-1 vs. Big East, 0-1 vs. C-USA								

^{*} – The Sun Belt is ineligible for the Bowl Challenge Cup as they failed to have the minimum three teams to qualify.

^{†} – Clinched 2007–08 Bowl Challenge Cup.

NOTE: BCS AQ conferences had a 6–2 mark against BCS non-AQ conferences in 2007–08.

=== Final rankings ===
==== Associated Press ====
- 1. LSU (60 First Place votes)
- 2. Georgia (3)
- 3. USC (1)
- 4. Missouri
- 5. Ohio State
- 6. West Virginia
- 7. Kansas (1)
- 8. Oklahoma
- 9. Virginia Tech
- 10. Boston College
- (tie) Texas
- 12. Tennessee
- 13. Florida
- 14. Brigham Young
- 15. Auburn
- 16. Arizona State
- 17. Cincinnati
- 18. Michigan
- 19. Hawaii
- 20. Illinois
- 21. Clemson
- 22. Texas Tech
- 23. Oregon
- 24. Wisconsin
- 25. Oregon State

==== USA Today Coaches Poll ====
- 1. LSU (60 first place votes)^{*}
- 2. USC
- 3. Georgia
- 4. Ohio State
- 5. Missouri
- 6. West Virginia
- 7. Kansas
- 8. Oklahoma
- 9. Virginia Tech
- 10. Texas
- 11. Boston College
- 12. Tennessee
- 13. Arizona State
- 14. Auburn
- (tie) Brigham Young
- 16. Florida
- 17. Hawaii
- 18. Illinois
- 19. Michigan
- 20. Cincinnati
- 21. Wisconsin
- 22. Clemson
- 23. Texas Tech
- 24. Oregon
- 25. Penn State

* – By rule, the AFCA members who participate in the poll must list the BCS Title Game winner on all ballots in the first place position.

== Post-BCS All-Star Games ==
All-Star Game	Date	Location	Television	Result
Cornerstone Bancard Hula Bowl	January 12, 2008	Aloha Stadium, Honolulu, Hawaii	ESPN	Aina (East) 38, Kai (West) 7
East–West Shrine Game	January 19, 2008	Robertson Stadium, Houston	ESPN2	West 31, East 17
Under Armour Senior Bowl	January 26, 2008	Ladd–Peebles Stadium, Mobile, Alabama	NFL Network	South 17, North 16
Western Refining Texas vs. The Nation Game	February 2, 2008	Sun Bowl Stadium, UTEP, El Paso, Texas	CSTV	Texas 41, The Nation 14
