= 2007 Mountain West Conference football season =

- League: NCAA Division I FBS (Football Bowl Subdivision)
- Sport: Football
- Teams: 9

2008 NFL Draft
- Top draft pick: QB Kevin O'Connell, San Diego State
- Picked by: Baltimore Ravens, 94th overall

Regular Season
- Champion: BYU

Football seasons
- ← 2006 2008 →

2007 Mountain West Conference football standings
| | Conf. | | | Overall |
| Team | W | | L | W | | L |
|---|---|---|---|---|---|---|
| No. 14 BYU $ | 8 | – | 0 | 11 | – | 2 |
| Air Force | 6 | – | 2 | 9 | – | 4 |
| New Mexico | 5 | – | 3 | 9 | – | 4 |
| Utah | 5 | – | 3 | 9 | – | 4 |
| TCU | 4 | – | 4 | 8 | – | 5 |
| San Diego State | 3 | – | 5 | 4 | – | 8 |
| Wyoming | 2 | – | 6 | 5 | – | 7 |
| Colorado State | 2 | – | 6 | 3 | – | 9 |
| UNLV | 1 | – | 7 | 2 | – | 10 |
$ – Conference champion; Rankings from AP Poll

The 2007 Mountain West Conference football season was the ninth since eight former members of the Western Athletic Conference banded together to form the MW. It began on August 30 when UNLV defeated Utah State. The same night, Utah fell to Oregon State in Corvallis, Oregon. Brigham Young University won its fourth conference title.

== Coaching changes ==
- Troy Calhoun took over at Air Force, following the retirement of longtime Falcons' coach Fisher DeBerry.

== Statistical leaders ==
Passing
| Player | School | COMP | ATT | YDS | TD | INT |
|---|---|---|---|---|---|---|
| Max Hall | BYU | 277 | 461 | 3,617 | 24 | 12 |
| Kevin O'Connell | SDSU | 257 | 439 | 3063 | 15 | 8 |
| Donovan Porterie | New Mexico | 223 | 380 | 2636 | 13 | 8 |

Rushing
| Player | School | ATT | YDS | YPC | TD |
|---|---|---|---|---|---|
| Chad Hall | Air Force | 211 | 1415 | 6.7 | 14 |
| Harvey Unga | BYU | 227 | 1,211 | 5.3 | 13 |
| Rodney Ferguson | New Mexico | 292 | 1179 | 4.0 | 13 |
| Darrell Mack | Utah | 231 | 1128 | 4.9 | 10 |

Receiving
| Player | School | REC | YDS | YPC | TD |
|---|---|---|---|---|---|
| Marcus Smith | New Mexico | 86 | 1039 | 12.1 | 3 |
| Travis Brown | New Mexico | 68 | 895 | 13.2 | 5 |
| Brett Swain | SDSU | 58 | 973 | 16.8 | 5 |
| Austin Collie | BYU | 50 | 837 | 16.7 | 6 |

Tackles
| Player | School | SOLO | AST | TOTAL |
|---|---|---|---|---|
| Beau Bell | UNLV | 79 | 47 | 126 |
| Russell Allen | SDSU | 71 | 48 | 119 |
| Drew Fowler | Air Force | 43 | 67 | 110 |
| Kelly Poppinga | BYU | 42 | 58 | 100 |

Sacks
| Player | School | SACKS |
|---|---|---|
| Jan Jorgensen | BYU | 13.5 |
| John Fletcher | Wyoming | 10.5 |
| Chase Ortiz | TCU | 8.0 |

Interceptions
| Player | School | INT |
|---|---|---|
| Carson Bird | Air Force | 6 |
| Julius Stinson | Wyoming | 5 |

== Memorable Games ==
- Colorado 31, Colorado State 28

September 1, 2007 • Invesco Field at Mile High • Denver, Colorado • FSN • Attendance: 68,133

A Kyle Bell touchdown run with 10:05 remaining in the 3rd gave Colorado State a 28–17 lead, but a Demetrius Sumler score later in the quarter brought Colorado within 3. Buffaloes' kicker Kevin Eberhart kicked a 22-yard field goal with 13 seconds left in regulation to force overtime. The Rams had the first possession in overtime, but quarterback Caleb Hanie's pass was intercepted in the endzone. Eberhart then kicked a 35-yard field goal to win the Rocky Mountain Showdown for Colorado.

- Wyoming 23, Virginia 3

September 1, 2007 • War Memorial Stadium • Laramie, Wyoming • Versus • Attendance: 31,620

Cowboys' running back Devin Moore ran for 125 yards, and the Wyoming defense held Virginia to just 110 yards of total offense and only 7 rushing yards to begin their season by defeating a Cavaliers squad that would end the year 9–4 and one of the best teams in the ACC.

- BYU 20, Arizona 7

September 1, 2007 • LaVell Edwards Stadium • Provo, Utah • Versus • Attendance: 64,525

Max Hall threw for 288 yards and two touchdowns in his first game as full-time starter at BYU, and the Cougars' defense held Arizona to just 32 yards rushing to avenge a season-opening loss to the Wildcats a year prior.

- #13 UCLA 27, BYU 17

September 8, 2007 • Rose Bowl Stadium • Pasadena, California • Versus • Attendance: 72,986

Despite being outgained by the Cougars 435-236, UCLA was able to capitalize on three BYU turnovers- including a 56-yard interception return for a touchdown by Trey Brown- and held on to win the first meeting of the two teams.

- #7 Texas 34, #19 TCU 13

September 8, 2007 • Royal-Memorial Stadium • Austin, Texas • FSN • Attendance: 84,621

The Horned Frogs led 10–0 at halftime on the strength of a 45-yard interception return for a touchdown by senior cornerback Torrey Stewart, but Texas began the second half with 27 unanswered points to pull away for good.

- Air Force 20, TCU 13 (OT)

September 13, 2007 • Falcon Stadium • Colorado Springs, Colorado • CSTV • Attendance: 31,556

Playing another road game just four days after the Texas game, TCU quarterback Andy Dalton's touchdown pass to Walter Bryant with 13:10 left in the 4th quarter put TCU ahead 17-3, but a touchdown pass from Shaun Carney to Keith Madsen and a 71-yard touchdown run by Jim Ollis tied the score at 17 all with just over five minutes to play. In the final minute of regulation, TCU found themselves well within field goal range, but Dalton's intended pass to Jimmy Young was intercepted by Carson Bird in the endzone to force overtime. The Horned Frogs had the first possession in overtime, but kicker Chris Manfredini's 36-yard field goal attempt hit the upright. Air Force kicker Ryan Harrison then nailed a 33-yard field goal to win it for the Falcons, and the cadets rushed the field.

- Utah 44, #11 UCLA 6

September 15, 2007 • Rice-Eccles Stadium • Salt Lake City, Utah • Versus • Attendance: 43,056

After starting the season 0-2, Utes' quarterback Tommy Grady threw for 246 yards and 3 touchdowns and running back Darrell Mack ran for 107 and a score as Utah overwhelmed the Bruins to avoid an 0-3 start and turn their season around.

- New Mexico 29, Arizona 27

September 15, 2007 • Arizona Stadium • Tucson, Arizona • FSN • Attendance: 51,996

Donovan Porterie threw for 327 yards and three touchdowns, and the New Mexico defense held Arizona to just 38 yards rushing to give the Lobos their second victory over a Pac-10 team in school history.

- TCU 21, SMU 7

September 22, 2007 • Amon G. Carter Stadium • Fort Worth, Texas • CSTV • Attendance: 31,511

A blocked punt return for a touchdown by redshirt freshman Bart Johnson and a 58-yard interception return for a touchdown were enough to overcome a lackluster offensive game for the Frogs, who avenged their only loss of the 2005 season and took back the Iron Skillet from their crosstown rivals.

- BYU 31, New Mexico 24

September 29, 2007 • University Stadium • Albuquerque, New Mexico • CSTV • Attendance: 34,204

Max Hall's 251 yards passing provided enough offense for the Cougars, who benefitted from five Lobo turnovers, to win a crucial conference road game in Albuquerque.

- Wyoming 24, TCU 21

October 6, 2007 • War Memorial Stadium • Laramie, Wyoming • the mtn. • Attendance: 23,007

Wyoming kicker Billy Vinnedge's 23-yard field goal gave the Cowboys a 24–6 lead with 8:25 remaining in the 4th quarter, but TCU quarterback Andy Dalton threw two touchdown passes to bring the Frogs to within 3. Another furious drive got TCU in position to send the game to overtime, but kicker Chris Manfredini's 48-yard field goal attempt missed as time expired.

- TCU 38, Stanford 36

October 13, 2007 • Stanford Stadium • Palo Alto, California • Attendance: 37,777

One week after a near-comeback against Wyoming, TCU found themselves behind 31–17 to Stanford, who had upset #1 USC the week before. This time, however, the Frogs comeback was successful, fueled by touchdown passes from Dalton to Jimmy Young and Aaron Brown, as well as a touchdown run by Brown.

- New Mexico 34, Air Force 31

October 25, 2007 • University Stadium • Albuquerque, New Mexico • Versus • Attendance: 26,087

Rodney Ferguson ran for 146 yards and two touchdowns, and kicker John Sullivan hit two fourth-quarter field goals as the Lobos overcame a 31–28 deficit late in the third quarter to defeat the Falcons.

- BYU 27, TCU 22

November 8, 2007 • LaVell Edwards Stadium • Provo, Utah • Versus • Attendance: 64,241

Max Hall passed for 305 yards and a touchdown and BYU's defense came up with two sacks in an 11-second span late in the 4th quarter to seal a 27–22 victory. Andy Dalton's touchdown pass to Bart Johnson with 3:49 remaining cut the Cougars' lead to 5, but then David Nixon sacked Andy Dalton on second down on the Frogs' last possession, then on fourth-and-8, Bryan Kehl pounced on Dalton as he lost his footing with 1:58 left. The Cougars ran out the clock and won for the 10th straight time at home.

- Air Force 41, Notre Dame 24

November 10, 2007 • Notre Dame Stadium • South Bend, Indiana • NBC • Attendance: 80,795

Air Force's Chad Hall ran for 142 yards, and the Falcons' defense held the Irish to just 58 yards on the ground to hand Notre Dame their most lopsided loss to a service academy since 1963.

- Colorado State 36, Wyoming 28

November 23, 2007 • Hughes Stadium • Fort Collins, Colorado • the mtn. • Attendance: 18,827

Caleb Hanie threw for 245 yards and two touchdowns to lead the Rams' to their third Border War win in four years and regain the Bronze Boot from the Cowboys. The loss ended all hope Wyoming had for making a bowl game.

- #23 BYU 17, Utah 10

November 24, 2007 • LaVell Edwards Stadium • Provo, Utah • Versus • Attendance: 64,749

Freshman running back Harvey Unga rushed for 141 yards and scored the winning touchdown for BYU on an 11-yard run with 38 seconds remaining as the Cougars defeated the Utes in thrilling fashion in the Holy War and also wrapped up their second straight conference title.

== Bowl Games ==
=== Poinsettia Bowl ===
- Utah 35, Navy 32

December 20, 2007 • Qualcomm Stadium • San Diego, California • ESPN

In the first bowl game of the 2007 season, the Utes' quarterback Brian Johnson threw for 226 yards as the Utah was able to outlast the 316 yards of rushing offense built up by the Midshipmen. It was Utah's seventh consecutive bowl victory, a streak that dates back to 1999.

=== New Mexico Bowl ===
- New Mexico 23, Nevada 0

December 22, 2007 • University Stadium • Albuquerque, New Mexico • ESPN

For the second year in a row, the Lobos were invited to play in their hometown bowl game. This time, however, they emerged victorious. It was their first bowl victory since 1961, snapping a five-game losing streak. Quarterback Donovan Porterie threw for 354 yards to earn MVP honors.

=== Las Vegas Bowl ===
- #19 BYU 17, UCLA 16

December 22, 2007 • Sam Boyd Stadium • Las Vegas, Nevada • ESPN

The Cougars and the Bruins had met in the regular season on September 8, with UCLA claiming victory, 27–17. In front of the Las Vegas Bowl's fifth consecutive sell-out, however, the Cougars won the rematch 17-16, as Eathyn Manumaleuna blocked UCLA kicker Kai Forbath's last-second field goal to preserve victory.

=== Texas Bowl ===
- TCU 20, Houston 13

December 28, 2007 • Reliant Stadium • Houston, Texas • NFL Network

In a rematch of former Southwest Conference rivals, TCU overcame a 10–7 halftime lead and then held back a last-minute rally by the Cougars to win their third consecutive bowl game, 20-13. Freshman quarterback Andy Dalton threw for 249 yards to earn MVP honors, while the TCU defense held Houston to just 32 yards rushing.

=== Armed Forces Bowl ===
- California 42, Air Force 36

December 31, 2007 • Amon G. Carter Stadium • Fort Worth, Texas • ESPN

Making their first bowl appearance since 2002, Air Force jumped out to a 21-0 lead to start the game. But then the Cal offense got going, with quarterback Kevin Riley throwing for 269 yards and 3 touchdowns and running back Justin Forsett running for 140 yards and two scores. This was the MW's only loss of the 2007 bowl season.

== Awards ==
- Coach of the Year: Troy Calhoun, Air Force
- Offensive Player of the Year: RB/WR Chad Hall, Sr, Air Force
- Defensive Player of the Year: LB Beau Bell, Sr, UNLV
- Special Teams Player of the Year: K/P Louie Sakoda, Jr, Utah
- Freshman of the Year: RB Harvey Unga, BYU

== All Conference teams ==
First-team:

Offense
| Quarterback | Max Hall, So, BYU |
| Running back | Chad Hall, Sr, Air Force; Rodney Ferguson, Jr, New Mexico |
| Wide receiver | Travis Brown, Sr, New Mexico; Marcus Smith, Sr, New Mexico |
| Tight end | Dennis Pitta, So, BYU |
| Offensive line | Blaine Guenther, Sr, Air Force; Ray Feinga, Jr, BYU; Dallas Reynolds, Jr, BYU; Devin Clark, Sr, New Mexico; Vince Natali, Sr, New Mexico |
| Kicker | John Sullivan, Sr, New Mexico |
| Kick returner | Brian Bonner, Sr, TCU |

Defense
| Defensive line | Jan Jorgensen, So, BYU; Chase Ortiz, Sr, TCU; Tyler Donaldson, Sr, New Mexico; Martail Burnett, Sr, Utah |
| Linebacker | Jon Rabold, Sr, Air Force; Bryan Kehl, Sr, BYU; Beau Bell, Sr, UNLV |
| Defensive back | Carson Bird, Sr, Air Force; DeAndre Wright, Jr, New Mexico; Steve Tate, Sr, Utah; Julius Stinson, Sr, Wyoming |
| Punter | Louie Sakoda, Jr, Utah |

Second-team:

Offense
| Quarterback | Kevin O'Connell, Sr, San Diego State |
| Running back | Harvey Unga, Fr, BYU; Darrell Mack, Jr, Utah |
| Wide receiver | Austin Collie, So, BYU; Brett Swain, Sr, San Diego State |
| Tight end | Wade Betschart, Sr, Wyoming |
| Offensive line | Nick Charles, So, Air Force; Nick Allotta, Sr, Colorado State; Blake Schlueter, Jr, TCU; Zane Beadles, So, Utah; Robert Conley, Jr, Utah |
| Kicker | Louie Sakoda, Sr, Utah |
| Kick returner | Derrek Richards, Sr, Utah |

Defense
| Defensive line | Jesse Nading, Sr, Colorado State; Michael Tuohy, Sr, New Mexico; Gabe Long, Sr, Utah; John Fletcher, So, Wyoming |
| Linebacker | Drew Fowler, Sr, Air Force; Kelly Poppinga, Sr, BYU; Jason Phillips, Jr, TCU |
| Defensive back | Stephen Hodge, Jr, TCU; David Roach, Sr, TCU; Mil'Von James, Sr, UNLV; Brice McCain, Jr, Utah |
| Punter | Michael Hughes, Sr, San Diego State |
