= 2007 UNLV Rebels football team =

American college football season

2007 UNLV Rebels football
- Conference: Mountain West Conference
- Record: 2–10 (1–7 MW)
- Head coach: Mike Sanford Sr. (3rd season)
- Offensive coordinator: Todd Berry (1st season)
- Offensive scheme: Spread
- Co-defensive coordinators: Kurt Barber (1st season); Vic Shealy (3rd season)
- Base defense: 4–3
- Home stadium: Sam Boyd Stadium

2007 Mountain West Conference football standings
	Conf.			Overall
Team	W		L	W		L
No. 14 BYU $	8	–	0	11	–	2
Air Force	6	–	2	9	–	4
New Mexico	5	–	3	9	–	4
Utah	5	–	3	9	–	4
TCU	4	–	4	8	–	5
San Diego State	3	–	5	4	–	8
Wyoming	2	–	6	5	–	7
Colorado State	2	–	6	3	–	9
UNLV	1	–	7	2	–	10
$ – Conference champion; Rankings from AP Poll

The 2007 UNLV Rebels football team represented the University of Nevada, Las Vegas (UNLV) as a member of the Mountain West Conference (MW) during the 2007 NCAA Division I FBS football season. Led by third-year head coach Mike Sanford Sr., the Rebels compiled an overall record of 2–10 record with mark of 1–7 in conference play, placing last out of nine teams in the MW. The team played home games at Sam Boyd Stadium in Whitney, Nevada.

== Schedule ==
Date	Time	Opponent	Site	TV	Result	Attendance
August 30	5:00 p.m.	at Utah State*	Romney Stadium; Logan, UT	LV1	W 23–16	15,102
September 8	7:00 p.m.	No. 5 Wisconsin*	Sam Boyd Stadium; Whitney, NV	Versus	L 13–20	38,250
September 15	6:30 p.m.	No. 18 Hawaii*	Sam Boyd Stadium; Whitney, NV	mtn.	L 14–49	38,125
September 22	7:00 p.m.	Utah	Sam Boyd Stadium; Whitney, NV	mtn.	W 27–0	23,180
September 29	1:00 p.m.	at Nevada*	Mackay Stadium; Reno, NV (Fremont Cannon)		L 20–27	25,278
October 6	6:00 p.m.	at Air Force	Falcon Stadium; Colorado Springs, CO	mtn.	L 14–31	35,583
October 13	6:30 p.m.	BYU	Sam Boyd Stadium; Whitney, NV	mtn.	L 14–24	38,026
October 20	6:00 p.m.	Colorado State^{†}	Sam Boyd Stadium; Whitney, NV		L 23–38	19,266
October 27	11:00 a.m.	at Wyoming	War Memorial Stadium; Laramie, WY	mtn.	L 24–29	16,940
November 10	8:00 p.m.	San Diego State	Sam Boyd Stadium; Whitney, NV	CSTV	L 30–38	18,837
November 17	4:30 p.m.	at TCU	Amon G. Carter Stadium; Fort Worth, TX	CSTV	L 10–34	26,425
November 24	2:30 p.m.	at New Mexico	University Stadium; Albuquerque, NM	mtn.	L 6–27	22,658
*Non-conference game; ^{†}Homecoming; Rankings from AP Poll released prior to the game; All times are in Pacific time
