= 2007 TCU Horned Frogs football team =

American college football season

2007 TCU Horned Frogs football

Texas Bowl champion

Texas Bowl, W 20–13 vs. Houston
- Conference: Mountain West Conference
- Record: 8–5 (4–4 MW)
- Head coach: Gary Patterson (7th season)
- Offensive coordinator: Mike Schultz (10th season)
- Offensive scheme: Spread
- Defensive coordinator: Dick Bumpas (4th season)
- Base defense: 4–2–5
- Home stadium: Amon G. Carter Stadium

Uniform

2007 Mountain West Conference football standings
	Conf.			Overall
Team	W		L	W		L
No. 14 BYU $	8	–	0	11	–	2
Air Force	6	–	2	9	–	4
New Mexico	5	–	3	9	–	4
Utah	5	–	3	9	–	4
TCU	4	–	4	8	–	5
San Diego State	3	–	5	4	–	8
Wyoming	2	–	6	5	–	7
Colorado State	2	–	6	3	–	9
UNLV	1	–	7	2	–	10
$ – Conference champion; Rankings from AP Poll

The 2007 Texas Christian Horned Frog football team represented Texas Christian University in the 2007 NCAA Division I FBS football season. The team was coached by Gary Patterson, who took over the program in December 2000. The Frogs played their home games in Amon G. Carter Stadium, which is located on campus in Fort Worth.

The Horned Frogs returned nine starters from their 2006 defense, which ended the season ranked 2nd nationally. Headlining the defense was All-America candidate defensive end Tommy Blake. On offense, the Frogs returned six starters and was led by redshirt freshman quarterback Andy Dalton.

On July 23, the Mountain West Conference held their annual Media Blitz in Las Vegas, where members of the media picked the Frogs as the favorite to win the conference. The media selected Aaron Brown as Preseason Offensive Player of the Year and Tommy Blake as Preseason Defensive Player of the Year.

== Schedule ==
Date	Time	Opponent	Rank	Site	TV	Result	Attendance
September 1	5:00 p.m.	Baylor*	No. 22	Amon G. Carter Stadium; Fort Worth, Texas (rivalry)	CSTV	W 27–0	35,606
September 8	6:00 p.m.	at No. 7 Texas*	No. 19	Darrell K Royal-Texas Memorial Stadium; Austin, Texas (rivalry)	FSN	L 13–34	84,621
September 13	7:00 p.m.	at Air Force		Falcon Stadium; Colorado Springs, Colorado	CSTV	L 17–20 ^{OT}	31,556
September 22	7:30 p.m.	SMU*^{†}		Amon G. Carter Stadium; Fort Worth, TX (Iron Skillet Game)	CSTV	W 21–7	31,511
September 29	6:00 p.m.	Colorado State		Amon G. Carter Stadium; Fort Worth, TX	the mtn.	W 24–12	32,807
October 6	1:00 p.m.	at Wyoming		War Memorial Stadium; Laramie, Wyoming	the mtn.	L 21–24	21,489
October 13	4:00 p.m.	at Stanford*		Stanford Stadium; Stanford, California		W 38–36	37,777
October 18	7:00 p.m.	Utah		Amon G. Carter Stadium; Fort Worth, TX	Versus	L 20–27	25,391
November 3	4:30 p.m.	New Mexico		Amon G. Carter Stadium; Fort Worth, TX	the mtn.	W 37–0	28,369
November 8	8:00 p.m.	at BYU		LaVell Edwards Stadium; Provo, Utah	Versus	L 22–27	64,241
November 17	6:30 p.m.	UNLV		Amon G. Carter Stadium; Fort Worth, TX		W 34–10	26,425
November 24	7:00 p.m.	at San Diego State		Qualcomm Stadium; San Diego, California		W 45–33	18,350
December 28	8:00 p.m.	vs. Houston*		Reliant Stadium; Houston, Texas (Texas Bowl)	NFL Network	W 20–13	62,079
*Non-conference game; ^{†}Homecoming; Rankings from AP Poll released prior to the game; All times are in Central time

== Statistical leaders ==
Passing
Player	Class	COMP	ATT	YDS	TD	INT
Andy Dalton	RFr.	222	371	2,459	10	11
Marcus Jackson	So.	35	69	368	3	1

Rushing
Player	Class	ATT	YDS	YPC	TD
Joseph Turner	So.	211	597	5.2	6
Aaron Brown	Jr.	106	490	4.6	2
Ryan Christian	So.	8	321	3.6	2

Receiving
Player	Class	REC	YDS	YPC	TD
Ervin Dickerson	Sr.	40	514	12.9	4
Donald Massey	Jr.	29	364	12.6	0
Walter Bryant	Jr.	27	337	12.5	1

Tackles
Player	Class	SOLO	AST	TOTAL
Jason Phillips	Jr.	58	29	87
David Hawthorne	Sr.	56	28	84
Brian Bonner	Sr.	56	22	78

Sacks:

Sacks
Player	Class	SACKS
Chase Ortiz	Sr.	9.0
Stephen Hodge	Jr.	8.0
David Hawthorne	Sr.	5.0

Interceptions
Player	Class	INT
Steven Coleman	Jr.	3
Rafael Priest	So.	3
Torrey Stewart	Sr.	2
Robert Henson	jr.	2

== Returning honorees ==
- Tommy Blake, Sr. defensive end: First Team All-MWC 2005 & 2006
- Chase Ortiz, Sr. defensive end: First Team All-MWC 2005 & 2006
- Jason Phillips, Jr. linebacker: First Team All-MWC 2006, Second Team All-MWC 2005
- Brian Bonner, Sr. safety/punt returner: First Team All-MWC PR, Second Team All-MWC Safety, 2006
- Aaron Brown, Jr. running back: Second Team All-MWC 2006, MWC Freshman of the Year 2005
- Matty Lindner, Sr. guard: Second Team All-MWC 2006

== Game summaries ==
=== Baylor ===
	1	2	3	4	Total
Baylor	0	0	0	0	0
TCU	0	14	0	13	27

With the 27–0 win, the Horned Frogs evened the all-time series with the Bears at 49–49–7. Defensive end Tommy Blake did not dress for the game, and running back Aaron Brown left in the first half with a knee injury. Redshirt freshman quarterback Andy Dalton, making his first career start, threw for 205 yards and a touchdown. Two missed field goals by Baylor and four interceptions by the TCU defense helped preserve the shutout. It was TCU's fifth consecutive victory over a Big 12 team.

=== Texas ===
	1	2	3	4	Total
TCU	0	10	0	3	13
Texas	0	0	10	24	34

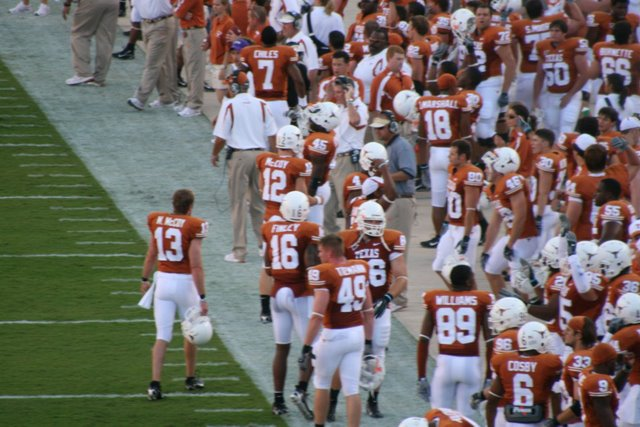
Texas sideline prior to TCU game

This was the second of three contests TCU had in 2007 against former SWC rivals, and this was the first time these two schools had faced each other since the conference disbanded following the 1995 season. With the win, Texas now leads the all-time series, 61–20–1. TCU led the game 10–0 at halftime on two interceptions- one returned for a touchdown by cornerback Torrey Stewart, the other by David Roach, setting up a field goal. However, Texas came out roaring with 27 unanswered points to open the second half and ended up winning easily, 34–13.

=== Air Force ===
	1	2	3	4	OT	Total
TCU	3	7	0	7	0	17
Air Force	0	3	0	14	3	20

Air Force erased a 17–3 4th-quarter deficit and won, 20–17. TCU kicker Chris Manfredini missed a 36-yard field goal in overtime before Air Force kicked the winning field goal. TCU quarterback Andy Dalton had 320 yards passing, a career high, but was also intercepted twice.

=== SMU ===
	1	2	3	4	Total
SMU	7	0	0	0	7
TCU	7	14	0	0	21

The Mustangs were the first to strike paydirt in TCU's Homecoming game, with a 15-yard touchdown run by running back DeMyron Martin in the first quarter. The TCU special teams and defense answered to give the Frogs the lead for good, though. They evened the score on a blocked punt that wide receiver Bart Johnson returned for a touchdown, and then linebacker Robert Henson took an interception back 58 yards for a score early in the second quarter. Derek Moore hauled in a Marcus Jackson pass to give the Frogs a 21–7 lead at halftime, and that ended up being the final score as well. With the win, the Frogs now hold a 41–39–7 advantage in the series, which is called "The Battle for the Iron Skillet".

=== Colorado State ===
	1	2	3	4	Total
Colorado State	3	0	3	6	12
TCU	7	10	7	0	24

Marcus Jackson, filling in for an injured Andy Dalton, ran for two touchdowns and threw for another, and the TCU defense kept Colorado State's offense out of the endzone until the 4th quarter to emerge victorious on Family Weekend.

=== Wyoming ===
	1	2	3	4	Total
TCU	3	3	0	15	21
Wyoming	7	0	14	3	24

With 6:30 remaining in the 4th quarter, TCU found themselves behind the Cowboys in Laramie, Wyoming. Andy Dalton then threw a 26-yard touchdown to Ervin Dickerson to make the score 24–14. On the ensuing Wyoming possession, the Frogs forced a three & out before sacking the Cowboy punter on his own 29-yard line, turning the ball over on downs. Six plays later, Dalton found Bart Johnson for another score, pulling the Frogs to within 24–21. TCU got the ball back with 1:17 to play on their own 20-yard line, driving themselves into position for a potential game-tying 48-yard field goal, but kicker Chris Manfredini's attempt hit the right goalpost as time expired.

=== Stanford ===
	1	2	3	4	Total
TCU	0	17	7	14	38
Stanford	7	14	10	5	36

A week after defeating top-ranked USC, Stanford welcomed TCU to Palo Alto for their Homecoming. It was also the first-ever meeting between the two schools. The Frogs again found themselves with a double-digit deficit late in the second half in this game, as they trailed the Cardinal 31–17 with 3:54 remaining in the 3rd quarter. Andy Dalton then hit Jimmy Young for a 70-yard touchdown and Aaron Brown for a 2-yard touchdown pass on fourth down to tie the game at 31. Stanford kicked a field goal with 7:22 remaining to re-take the lead, 34–31. Aaron Brown gave TCU its first lead of the game with a 2-yard touchdown run with 4:13 left. An intentional safety by TCU in the final seconds made the final score 38–36. Andy Dalton ended the game with a career-high 344 passing yards.

=== Utah ===
	1	2	3	4	Total
Utah	10	14	0	3	27
TCU	0	17	0	3	20

This was the fifth meeting between the Frogs and the Utes, a series which Utah leads 4–1. Two years ago, the Frogs snapped Utah's 18-game win streak with a 23–20 overtime win in Fort Worth. Last year, Utah defeated TCU 20–7 in Salt Lake City, which was one of only two defeats the Frogs suffered in 2006.

=== New Mexico ===
	1	2	3	4	Total
New Mexico	0	0	0	0	0
TCU	10	10	17	0	37

This will be the ninth meeting between the Frogs and the Lobos, a series that dates back to 1991 and that TCU leads, 5–3. The Frogs have won both contests between the schools since joining the MWC, including a 27–21 win last year in New Mexico.

=== BYU ===
	1	2	3	4	Total
TCU	3	6	6	7	22
BYU	7	10	7	3	27

This was the seventh meeting between the Frogs and the Cougars, who are the two most recent MWC Champions. On their way to the 2005 league title, the Frogs pulled out a thrilling 51–50 win in triple overtime at LaVell Edwards Stadium in Provo. Last year, BYU defeated TCU 31–17 in Fort Worth on their way to the 2006 title.

=== UNLV ===
	1	2	3	4	Total
UNLV	0	7	3	0	10
TCU	14	14	3	3	34

This will be the sixth meeting between the Frogs and the Rebels, with TCU leading the series 4–1. The Frogs have won the last two meetings between the schools by a combined score of 76–13.

=== San Diego State ===
	1	2	3	4	Total
TCU	0	21	21	3	45
San Diego State	17	7	3	6	33

TCU and San Diego State had never played before TCU joined the MWC in 2005, and the Frogs have been victorious in both meetings between the schools, including a 52–0 win in Fort Worth last year.

=== The Texas Bowl ===
	1	2	3	4	Total
TCU	0	7	3	10	20
University of Houston	7	3	0	3	13
