= 2007 Wyoming Cowboys football team =

American college football season

2007 Wyoming Cowboys football
- Conference: Mountain West Conference
- Record: 5–7 (2–6 MW)
- Head coach: Joe Glenn (5th season)
- Offensive coordinator: Billy Cockhill (5th season)
- Offensive scheme: Multiple
- Defensive coordinator: Mike Breske (5th season)
- Base defense: 3–4
- Home stadium: War Memorial Stadium

2007 Mountain West Conference football standings
	Conf.			Overall
Team	W		L	W		L
No. 14 BYU $	8	–	0	11	–	2
Air Force	6	–	2	9	–	4
New Mexico	5	–	3	9	–	4
Utah	5	–	3	9	–	4
TCU	4	–	4	8	–	5
San Diego State	3	–	5	4	–	8
Wyoming	2	–	6	5	–	7
Colorado State	2	–	6	3	–	9
UNLV	1	–	7	2	–	10
$ – Conference champion; Rankings from AP Poll

The 2007 Wyoming Cowboys football team represented the University of Wyoming as a member Mountain West Conference (MW) during the 2007 NCAA Division I FBS football season. Led by fifth-year head coach Joe Glenn, the Cowboys compiled an overall record of 5–7 record with mark 2–6 in conference play, tying for third place in the MW. The team played home games at War Memorial Stadium in Laramie, Wyoming.

== Schedule ==
Date	Time	Opponent	Site	TV	Result	Attendance
September 1	12:00 pm	Virginia*	War Memorial Stadium; Laramie, WY	Versus	W 23–3	31,620
September 8	12:00 pm	Utah State*	War Memorial Stadium; Laramie, WY (rivalry)	mtn.	W 32–18	19,443
September 15	6:00 pm	at Boise State*	Bronco Stadium; Boise, ID	ESPNGP	L 14–24	30,199
September 22	1:00 pm	at Ohio*	Peden Stadium; Athens, OH	ESPNGP	W 34–33	16,781
October 6	12:00 pm	TCU	War Memorial Stadium; Laramie, WY	mtn.	W 24–21	23,007
October 13	12:00 pm	New Mexico	War Memorial Stadium; Laramie, WY	mtn.	L 3–20	22,301
October 20	12:00 pm	at Air Force	Falcon Stadium; Colorado Springs, CO	mtn.	L 12–20	41,531
October 27	12:00 pm	UNLV	War Memorial Stadium; Laramie, WY	mtn.	W 29–24	16,940
November 3	7:00 pm	at San Diego State	Qualcomm Stadium; San Diego, CA	mtn.	L 24–27	22,852
November 10	1:30 pm	at Utah	Rice–Eccles Stadium; Salt Lake City, UT	CSTV	L 0–50	42,477
November 17	12:00 pm	BYU	War Memorial Stadium; Laramie, WY	mtn.	L 10–35	19,827
November 23	12:00 pm	at Colorado State	Hughes Stadium; Fort Collins, CO (Border War)	mtn.	L 28–36	18,827
*Non-conference game; All times are in Mountain time
