= 2007 Colorado State Rams football team =

American college football season

2007 Colorado State Rams football
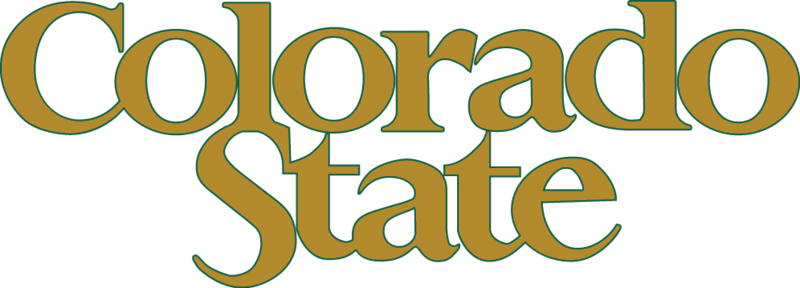
- Conference: Mountain West Conference
- Record: 3–9 (2–6 MW)
- Head coach: Sonny Lubick (15th season)
- Co-offensive coordinators: Dan Hammerschmidt (7th season); Dave Lay (5th season)
- Defensive coordinator: Steve Stanard (5th season)
- Home stadium: Sonny Lubick Field at Hughes Stadium

2007 Mountain West Conference football standings
	Conf.			Overall
Team	W		L	W		L
No. 14 BYU $	8	–	0	11	–	2
Air Force	6	–	2	9	–	4
New Mexico	5	–	3	9	–	4
Utah	5	–	3	9	–	4
TCU	4	–	4	8	–	5
San Diego State	3	–	5	4	–	8
Wyoming	2	–	6	5	–	7
Colorado State	2	–	6	3	–	9
UNLV	1	–	7	2	–	10
$ – Conference champion; Rankings from AP Poll

The 2007 Colorado State Rams football team represented Colorado State University in the college football 2007 NCAA Division I FBS football season. They played their home games at Sonny Lubick Field at Hughes Stadium in Fort Collins, CO and were led by head coach Sonny Lubick in his final season at CSU. The Rams finished the season 3–9 (2–6 MWC) for eighth place in the Mountain West Conference.

== Schedule ==
Date	Time	Opponent	Site	TV	Result	Attendance	Source
September 1	10:00 am	vs. Colorado*	Invesco Field at Mile High; Denver, CO (Rocky Mountain Showdown)	FSN	L 28–31 ^{OT}	68,133	
September 8	12:00 pm	No. 10 California*	Hughes Stadium; Fort Collins, CO	CSTV	L 28–34	27,805	
September 22	2:30 pm	at Houston*	Robertson Stadium; Houston, TX	CSTV	L 27–38	22,468	
September 29	5:00 pm	at TCU	Amon G. Carter Stadium; Fort Worth, TX	mtn	L 12–24	32,807	
October 6	3:30 pm	San Diego State	Hughes Stadium; Fort Collins, CO	mtn	L 20–24	27,930	
October 13	3:30 pm	Air Force	Hughes Stadium; Fort Collins, CO	mtn	L 21–45	25,150	
October 20	5:00 pm	at UNLV	Sam Boyd Stadium; Las Vegas, NV	mtn	W 48–23	19,266	
October 27	3:30 pm	Utah	Hughes Stadium; Fort Collins, CO	mtn	L 3–27	16,718	
November 3	12:00 pm	at BYU	LaVell Edwards Stadium; Provo, UT	mtn	L 16–35	64,441	
November 10	1:00 pm	at New Mexico	University Stadium; Albuquerque, NM	mtn	L 23–26	27,031	
November 17	12:00 pm	Georgia Southern*	Hughes Stadium; Fort Collins, CO		W 42–34	14,332	
November 23	12:00 pm	Wyoming	Hughes Stadium; Fort Collins, CO	mtn	W 36–28	18,827	
*Non-conference game; Rankings from AP Poll released prior to the game; All times are in Mountain time

== Roster ==
2007 Colorado State Rams football team roster
Players
Coaches
Offense

Pos.	#	Name	Class
RB	29	Kyle Bell	Jr

Defense

Pos.	#	Name	Class
DE	44	Bob Vomhof	Sr
DE	91	Tommie Hill	Jr

Special teams

Pos.	#	Name	Class
P	8	Jimmie Kaylor	Sr

Head coach

- Sonny Lubick

Coordinators/assistant coaches

Legend

- (C) Team captain
- (S) Suspended
- (I) Ineligible
- Injured
- Redshirt

Roster
