= 2007 New Mexico Lobos football team =

American college football season

2007 New Mexico Lobos football

New Mexico Bowl champion

New Mexico Bowl, W 23–0 vs. Nevada
- Conference: Mountain West Conference
- Record: 9–4 (5–3 MW)
- Head coach: Rocky Long (10th season)
- Offensive coordinator: Dave Baldwin (1st season)
- Offensive scheme: Spread
- Defensive coordinator: Osia Lewis (5th season)
- Base defense: 3–3–5
- Home stadium: University Stadium

2007 Mountain West Conference football standings
	Conf.			Overall
Team	W		L	W		L
No. 14 BYU $	8	–	0	11	–	2
Air Force	6	–	2	9	–	4
New Mexico	5	–	3	9	–	4
Utah	5	–	3	9	–	4
TCU	4	–	4	8	–	5
San Diego State	3	–	5	4	–	8
Wyoming	2	–	6	5	–	7
Colorado State	2	–	6	3	–	9
UNLV	1	–	7	2	–	10
$ – Conference champion; Rankings from AP Poll

The 2007 New Mexico Lobos football team represented the University of New Mexico as a member of the Mountain West Conference (MW) during the 2007 NCAA Division I FBS football season. Led by tenth-year head coach Rocky Long, the Lobos compiled an overall record of 9–4 with a mark of 5–3 in conference play, tying for third place in the MW. New Mexico was invited to the New Mexico Bowl, where the Lobos defeated Nevada. The team played home games at University Stadium in Albuquerque, New Mexico.

== Schedule ==
Date	Time	Opponent	Site	TV	Result	Attendance
September 1	8:00pm	at UTEP*	Sun Bowl; El Paso, TX	mtn	L 6–10	43,326
September 8	7:30pm	New Mexico State*	University Stadium; Albuquerque, NM (Rio Grande Rivalry)	mtn	W 44–34	41,033
September 15	8:00pm	at Arizona*	Arizona Stadium; Tucson, AZ (rivalry)	mtn	W 29–27	51,996
September 22	6:00pm	Sacramento State*	University Stadium; Albuquerque, NM	mtn	W 58–0	27,023
September 29	6:30pm	BYU^{†}	University Stadium; Albuquerque, NM	mtn	L 24–31	34,204
October 13	12:00pm	at Wyoming	War Memorial Stadium; Laramie, WY	mtn	W 20–3	22,301
October 20	6:30pm	at San Diego State	Qualcomm Stadium; San Diego, CA	mtn	W 20–17	20,205
October 25	7:00pm	Air Force	University Stadium; Albuquerque, NM	mtn	W 34–31	26,287
November 3	3:30pm	at TCU	Amon G. Carter Stadium; Fort Worth, TX	mtn	L 0–37	28,369
November 10	1:00pm	Colorado State	University Stadium; Albuquerque, NM	mtn	W 26–23	27,301
November 17	3:30pm	at Utah	Rice–Eccles Stadium; Salt Lake City, UT	mtn	L 10–28	43,788
November 24	7:00pm	UNLV	University Stadium; Albuquerque, NM	mtn	W 27–6	22,658
December 22	2:30pm	Nevada*	University Stadium; Albuquerque, NM (New Mexico Bowl)	ESPN	W 23–0	30,223
*Non-conference game; ^{†}Homecoming; All times are in Mountain time

== Game summaries ==
=== UTEP ===
	1	2	3	4	Total
New Mexico	0	3	0	3	6
UTEP	3	0	0	7	10

Coming off a lackluster 6–7 season, the Lobos were determined to come away from El Paso with a victory. The game started off slow, with a combined score of just 3 points (UTEP's Jose Martinez scored a 51-yard field goal on their first possession).

In the second quarter, the Lobos responded with a field goal of their own, bring the score to 3–3. Both teams' defenses held up for the remainder of the first half.

To begin the third quarter, neither team could score. The two traded punts and had key defensive stops to end the third quarter still 3–3.

Early success in the fourth quarter allowed New Mexico to go up 6–3 when John Sullivan connected for a 40-yard field goal. UTEP gained possession of the football and drove down the field, aided by two New Mexico penalties. Terrell Jackson broke free from defenders on a 36-yard run, and scored the night's only touchdown with 13:08 remaining. Despite the amount of time remaining, neither team would score again. The final was 10–6. It was the lowest point production by UTEP since 1975.

=== New Mexico State ===
	1	2	3	4	Total
New Mexico State	14	0	10	10	34
New Mexico	14	3	10	17	44

To begin the game, both sides showed their offenses, putting up 14 points on both sides of the scoreboard. The second quarter seemed to slow down the offensive production. New Mexico's defense allowed 0 points, while New Mexico State's gave up only a field goal. The score going into halftime was 17–14. In the third quarter, both teams again showed off their offense, but the defense was still strong. Both teams put up 10 points, making the score 27–24 going into the final quarter of the game.

New Mexico scored a touchdown early in the quarter, while New Mexico State made a field goal, making the score 34–27 with around 7:00 left to play. NMSU had possession of the ball, and was driving down the field, led mostly by quarterback Chase Holbrook. Momentum swung, however, when an errant pass landed in the arms of New Mexico's Frankie Solomon. New Mexico quarterback Donovan Porterie stepped up quickly, connecting on a 50-yard pass to Travis Brown to reach the Aggies' 25-yard line. John Sullivan made a 21-yard field goal, putting the Lobos up 37–27 with 5:22 to play. Despite a 10-point deficit, the Aggies began to drive again, but their loss was guaranteed when Holbrook threw another interception. New Mexico quickly drove down the field and scored a touchdown, making the score 44–27. Holbrook would not quit, though, and he drove his Aggie team down for a touchdown with 1:16 left to play. On the onside kick, New Mexico State managed to retrieve the ball, but with such little time left, they could not score in time, reaching the 4-yard line when time expired.

The game drew the fourth largest crowd ever in University Stadium, with an attendance of 41,033. University Stadium's capacity only reaches 38,634, but many fans sat on the grassy area on the southeast part of the stadium.

With the win, the Lobos improved to 1–1.

=== Arizona ===
	1	2	3	4	Total
New Mexico	7	7	12	3	29
Arizona	10	3	0	14	27

Coming off a big victory against rival New Mexico State, the Lobos headed into Arizona for a big road game.

The first quarter saw impressive stats from both teams, with a close score of 7–10 leading into the second quarter.

The second quarter was the start of Arizona's decline, with several key penalties called against them, and a turnover that led to a New Mexico touchdown. Going into halftime, the Lobos led 14–13.

On their first possession of the third quarter, Arizona drove down the field to the 2-yard line. On the next play, however, they fumbled the ball, and New Mexico's OJ Smith picked it up. New Mexico quarterback Donovan Porterie led the Lobos down the field several times and allowed them to score 12 points. The Lobos had a comfortable 26–13 lead going into the fourth quarter.

Arizona continued to play hard however, with quarterback Tuitama leading the Wildcats down the field. The team put up 14 points in the fourth quarter, but their mistakes in penalties and turnovers cost them, as New Mexico put up 3 points towards the end of the quarter, edging out Arizona 29–27. Donovan Porterie threw for 327 yards and had three touchdowns, and Arizona's Tuitama threw for 446 yards with three touchdowns.

It was only the Lobos' second win against a Pac-10 team in 11 games. With the victory, the Lobos improved to 2–1.

=== Sacramento State ===
	1	2	3	4	Total
Sacramento State	0	0	0	0	0
New Mexico	10	20	14	14	58

After an impressive win in Arizona, the Lobos returned home to face 1-AA opponent Sacramento State. The Hornets came into the game 0–6 against Division I-A football teams.

New Mexico running back Rodney Ferguson had a total of 129 yards rushing and a career-high four touchdowns. Donovan Porterie threw for 229 yards and one touchdown. The Hornets were mistake ridden, giving up key turnovers and were not able to have offensive success. They could not score any points throughout the entire game, and the Lobos won 58–0.

With the win, the Lobos improved to 3-1

=== BYU ===
	1	2	3	4	Total
BYU	7	7	7	10	31
New Mexico	0	6	15	3	24

In an important Mountain West Conference game, BYU came to New Mexico with a 1–0 conference record. Both teams had strong momentum coming into the game, with New Mexico on a 3-game win streak.

The first three quarters of the game were mostly even, with both offenses trading touchdowns and punts. Donovan Porterie and Max Hall were impressive, and the score leading into the fourth quarter was a tie; 21–21.

Early in the fourth quarter, the Lobos fumbled the ball away to BYU, which set up a touchdown by Hall. The Lobos quickly drove down the field and answered with a 43-yard field goal, making the score 28–24. New Mexico managed to hold BYU to a three and out possession, but the momentum quickly shifted when Frankie Solomon fumbled on the punt return. Hall led the team down the field, and set up a 22-yard field goal, causing the Cougars to hold a 31–24 lead. New Mexico was unable to move down the field and was forced to punt. The Cougars ran down the clock, which led to their victory.

With the loss, the Lobos fell to 3–2 overall and 0–1 in conference play.

=== Wyoming ===
	1	2	3	4	Total
New Mexico	3	7	10	0	20
Wyoming	0	3	0	0	3

Following their loss to BYU, the Lobos headed to Wyoming for their second Mountain West Conference game.

On their first possession of the game, the Lobos charged down field on a drive that ended in a 39-yard John Sullivan field goal, giving the Lobos an early lead. For the rest of the first quarter, neither team managed to gain enough offensive momentum to score. At the end of quarter, a weather delay was issued because of strong lightning and heavy rain in the area. The delay would go on to last 1 hour and 43 minutes.

After the delay, the second quarter began and New Mexico drove down the field, with Donovan Porterie completing a 63-yard TD pass to Travis Brown. The game went to halftime, but it was shortened to only 3 minutes because of the delay.

Early in the third quarter, Wyoming quarterback Karsten Sween fumbled on their own 2-yard line, leading to a New Mexico score. Later in the quarter, New Mexico scored a field goal, bringing the score to 20–3. Neither team would score in the fourth quarter, and New Mexico walked away with the win.

With the win, the Lobos improved to 4–2 overall and 1–1 in conference play.

=== San Diego State ===
	1	2	3	4	Total
New Mexico	3	7	0	10	20
San Diego State	0	10	7	0	17

Coming off a road win against Wyoming, the Lobos visited Qualcomm Stadium to face another important conference game against San Diego State.

In the first quarter of the game, neither team showed any offensive breakthroughs, with New Mexico scoring only a field goal, and SDSU scoring nothing. The score going into the second quarter was 3–0

In the second quarter, San Diego State's quarterback Kevin O'Connell had success moving his team down the field, on a drive where he himself scored a rushing touchdown. SDSU also scored a field goal on a later possession. New Mexico quickly responded with a touchdown of their own, leaving the score 10–10 at halftime.

In the third quarter, the Lobos seemed to be out of sync offensively, while San Diego State forced them to punt. O'Connell was able to push his offense down the field and scored another rushing touchdown, making the score 10–17.

Early in the fourth quarter, New Mexico began to move down the field, but their drive ended with a field goal only. The score was now 17–14. The Aztecs moved down the field rather quickly, and appeared to have the game in hand, but O'Connell made a crucial mistake when he fumbled the ball trying to run for the first down. The Lobos recovered and drove down the field. Rodney Ferguson's six-yard touchdown run with 15 seconds left in the game lifted New Mexico to a 20–17 victory.

With the win, the Lobos improved to 5–2 overall and 2–1 in conference play.

=== Air Force ===
	1	2	3	4	Total
Air Force	7	14	10	0	31
New Mexico	10	11	7	6	34

With an impressive 5–2(2–1) record, New Mexico looked to defeat another Mountain West Conference team with an impressive record; Air Force.

Early in the first quarter, the New Mexico offense drove down the field twice, one ending in a field goal, and the other in a Rodney Fergusson touchdown run. The Falcons also had success early on, responding right back to bring the score leading into the second quarter to 10–7.

In the second quarter, the Falcons stopped the Lobos and drove down the field to score a touchdown that gave them the lead by 3. The Lobos could not respond with any points and were forced to punt. Air Force then rolled down the field again, scoring another touchdown. The Lobos drove down the field and scored a field goal late in the quarter, cutting the Falcons' lead to 8. On the kickoff however, Air Force's Ty Paffette fumbled the ball and New Mexico. With just 20 seconds left in the game, Donovan Porterie managed to throw a touchdown pass to tight end Chris Mark, which led to a tie game, 21–21, at halftime.

In the third quarter, both teams again traded touchdowns, tying the score at 28–28. Later on in the quarter, Air Force managed to score a field goal, giving them the lead.

In the fourth quarter, Air Force began to drive down the field twice, but on both those possessions they fumbled the ball away to New Mexico. The Lobos put up 6 points, including one field goal with just seconds left in the game to pull away from Air Force in a 34–31 victory.

With the win, the Lobos improved to 6–2 overall and 3–1 in conference play.

=== TCU ===
	1	2	3	4	Total
New Mexico	0	0	0	0	0
TCU	3	17	10	7	37

With the Lobos off to an impressive 6–2 start, most people could not have predicted what would happen when they invaded TCU for a key conference game. For all of the game, Donovan Porterie was completely shut down, throwing for just 76 yards. TCU also shut down Rodney Ferguson, allowing him only 28 yards.

On the other side of the ball, TCU was rolling over the Lobo defense. Quarterback Andy Dalton threw 2 touchdowns, backup Marcus Brock threw 1, and the Horned Frogs made 3 field goals. They shut out the Lobos in a surprising 0–37 game.

With the loss, the Lobos fell to 6–3 overall and 3–2 in conference play.

=== Colorado State ===
	1	2	3	4	Total
Colorado State	7	10	0	6	23
New Mexico	17	3	3	3	26

The Lobos returned home after a devastating loss to TCU to face their next MWC opponent, Colorado State.

New Mexico seemed to dominate for most of the first quarter, putting up 17 points and allowing Colorado State just 7. Donovan Porterie threw both touchdowns, and John Sullivan kicked a field goal. Going into the second quarter, the score was 17–7.

In the second quarter, the Rams began to rally back, scoring a touchdown early on. For the rest of the quarter, both teams had strong defensive stops leading to two field goals scored by each team. The score going into halftime was a close 20–17.

To start the second half, the Lobos marched down the field in a drive that ended with a John Sullivan field goal. The Rams could not gain any offensive momentum, and was shut out for the remainder of the quarter.

Early in the fourth quarter, the Rams pushed a long drive down the field and scored a field goal, bringing the score to 23–20 with 12:05 remaining. The Lobos fumbled the ball to Colorado State at the Lobos' 25-yard line. The Rams again moved down the field to tie the game at 23 with a 32-yard field goal with 8:24 left. Both teams were stopped and were forced to punt. When the Rams punted the ball to Marcus Smith, he ran back for 18 yards, to bring it to the Rams' 26-yard line with just 3 seconds remaining. John Sullivan kicked the game winning 43-yard field goal as time expired.

With the win, the Lobos improved to 7–3 overall and 4–2 in conference play.

=== Utah ===
	1	2	3	4	Total
New Mexico	0	0	10	0	10
Utah	0	14	7	7	28

The Lobos were again on the road to face a very important game against Utah. Both teams were fighting for their post season appearance in a bowl game, and both teams came into the game with the same overall and conference record.

The first quarter of the game proved to be an offensive battle, as the defense on both sides of the ball allowed 0 points. On the Lobos' first possession, they appeared to be moving down the field effectively, but running back Rodney Ferguson fumbled away to the Utes. Both teams traded punts, making the score 0–0 going into the second quarter.

In the second quarter, the Utes began to move down the field more efficiently, scoring a touchdown early on. The Lobos' were still having difficulties on offense, and were unable to score any points. Utah moved down the field again, scoring another touchdown to make the score 0–14 going into halftime.

In the third quarter, Utah quarterback Brian Johnson threw a costly interception, and the Lobos were able to score a touchdown, making the score 7–14. Utah again struggled on offense and punted away to the Lobos. New Mexico rolled down the field, and scored a field goal to make it 10–14 with 4:09 left in the quarter. New Mexico made a costly turnover of their own when Ian Clark fumbled the ball away on the 39-yard line. The Utes would score a touchdown with 49 seconds left in the quarter to make the score 10–21.

Early in the fourth quarter, the Lobos fumbled the ball again on a punt return, giving the ball to Utah on the 5-yard line. New Mexico would get the ball right back, however, as Johnson fumbled trying to run up the middle. New Mexico was driving down the field, when Paul Kruger knocked the ball out of Donovan Porterie's hands, where Koa Misi picked it up and ran it back for a Utes touchdown. With only 6:57 left in the game and the score 10–28, the Lobos could not make a comeback.

With the loss, the Lobos fell to 7–4 overall and 4–3 in conference play.

=== UNLV ===
	1	2	3	4	Total
UNLV	3	3	0	0	6
New Mexico	3	14	7	3	27

In the last regular season game of the year, the Lobos needed a win in order to appear in a bowl game. Their opponent was UNLV, who came into the game on a 14-game losing streak on the road against Mountain West opponents.

In the first quarter, both teams moved the ball rather well, leading to field goals. The score going into the second quarter was a tied 3–3.

In the second quarter, New Mexico had great offensive success, scoring two touchdowns, one by a 63-yard pass to Marcus Smith, and the other with a run by Travis Brown. UNLV only managed to score a field goal, making the game 17–6 going into halftime.

To start the third quarter, Marcus Smith ran the kickoff 82-yards setting up an easy 1-yard touchdown run by Rodney Fergusson. The score was now 24–6.

For the rest of the game, UNLV struggled on offense, putting up just 233 yards total. New Mexico would cap the win off when John Sullivan made a fourth-quarter field goal to make the score 27–6.

With the win, the Lobos improved to 8–4 overall and 5–3 in conference play.

=== Nevada ===
	1	2	3	4	Total
Nevada	0	0	0	0	0
New Mexico	14	6	0	3	23

New Mexico finished strong in the Mountain West Conference, allowing them a trip to the New Mexico Bowl for the second year in a row. They would face 6–6 Nevada. The Lobos would be without their star running back Rodney Fergusson because of academic issues.

To start the game, Donovan Porterie threw two touchdown passes, giving the Lobos a big lead over the Wolfpack. Nevada was stopped short on every drive, scoring 0 points in the entire game. John Sullivan kicked 3 field goals, two in the second quarter, and one in the fourth. Nevada had just 210 total yards to New Mexico's 518. The Lobos shut out Nevada 23–0.

The win ended the 46-year-long drought the Lobos faced in the postseason, and it marked the first bowl victory under Rocky Long. With the win, the Lobos finished the season 9–4.
