= 2007 Utah Utes football team =

American college football season

2007 Utah Utes football

Poinsettia Bowl champion

Poinsettia Bowl, W 35–32 vs. Navy
- Conference: Mountain West Conference
- Record: 9–4 (5–3 MW)
- Head coach: Kyle Whittingham (3rd season)
- Offensive coordinator: Andy Ludwig (3rd season)
- Offensive scheme: Spread
- Defensive coordinator: Gary Andersen (3rd season)
- Base defense: 4–3
- Home stadium: Rice-Eccles Stadium

2007 Mountain West Conference football standings
	Conf.			Overall
Team	W		L	W		L
No. 14 BYU $	8	–	0	11	–	2
Air Force	6	–	2	9	–	4
New Mexico	5	–	3	9	–	4
Utah	5	–	3	9	–	4
TCU	4	–	4	8	–	5
San Diego State	3	–	5	4	–	8
Wyoming	2	–	6	5	–	7
Colorado State	2	–	6	3	–	9
UNLV	1	–	7	2	–	10
$ – Conference champion; Rankings from AP Poll

The 2007 Utah Utes football team represented the University of Utah in the 2007 NCAA Division I FBS football season. The team was coached by third-year head football coach Kyle Whittingham. The Utes played their homes games in Rice-Eccles Stadium.

== Schedule ==
Date	Time	Opponent	Site	TV	Result	Attendance
August 30	8:00 pm	at Oregon State*	Reser Stadium; Corvallis, Oregon	FSN	L 7–24	40,409
September 8	4:00 pm	Air Force	Rice-Eccles Stadium; Salt Lake City	mtn.	L 12–20	43,454
September 15	3:00 pm	No. 11 UCLA*	Rice-Eccles Stadium; Salt Lake City	Versus	W 44–6	43,056
September 22	8:00 pm	at UNLV	Sam Boyd Stadium; Las Vegas	mtn.	L 0–27	23,180
September 29	1:00 pm	Utah State*^{†}	Rice-Eccles Stadium; Salt Lake City (Battle of the Brothers)	mtn.	W 34–18	41,884
October 5	6:00 pm	at Louisville*	Papa John's Cardinal Stadium; Louisville, Kentucky	ESPN	W 44–35	40,894
October 13	1:00 pm	San Diego State	Rice-Eccles Stadium; Salt Lake City		W 23–7	40,898
October 18	6:00 pm	at TCU	Amon G. Carter Stadium; Fort Worth, Texas	mtn.	W 27–20	25,391
October 27	3:30 pm	at Colorado State	Sonny Lubick Field at Hughes Stadium; Fort Collins, Colorado	mtn.	W 27–3	16,718
November 10	1:30 pm	Wyoming	Rice-Eccles Stadium; Salt Lake City,	CSTV	W 50–0	42,477
November 17	3:30 pm	New Mexico	Rice-Eccles Stadium; Salt Lake City	mtn.	W 28–10	43,788
November 24	12:00 pm	at No. 23 BYU	LaVell Edwards Stadium; Provo, Utah (Holy War)	CSTV & mtn.	L 10–17	64,749
December 20	7:00 pm	vs. Navy*	Qualcomm Stadium; San Diego (Poinsettia Bowl)	ESPN	W 35–32	39,129
*Non-conference game; ^{†}Homecoming; Rankings from AP Poll released prior to the game; All times are in Mountain time

== Game summaries ==
=== Oregon State ===
	1	2	3	4	Total
Utes	0	7	0	0	7
Beavers	0	7	10	7	24

The Utes and Beavers kicked off the 2007 college football season playing in the first game of the year. For the Utes, this game marked the long-awaited return of QB Brian Johnson, who sat out the 2006 on a medical red-shirt, and the debut of highly touted Junior College All-American transfer, RB Matt Asiata. Unfortunately, both Asiata and Johnson would suffer serious injuries that altered the season for the Utes. After only 4 carries, Matt Asiata's season ended when his leg was broken near the end of the 1st quarter. Brian Johnson threw a 36-yard touchdown pass to Brent Casteel to take the lead moments later, but was injured as well near the end of the first half suffering a separated shoulder that would take him out of the game and on to the sideline. Utah's offense was never able to put together a consistent drive and left their defense on the field for the majority of the game. Oregon State's offensive line and senior RB Yvenson Bernard took advantage of a fatigued Ute defense, racking up 165 yards rushing and 2 TDs on 29 carries.

=== Air Force ===
	1	2	3	4	Total
Falcons	3	0	7	10	20
Utes	3	0	3	6	12

In the conference opener for both teams, Utah's injury woes would continue against the falcons as junior WR Brent Casteel suffered a torn ACL which ended his season while Air force accumulated 334 rushing yards and controlled most of the game. In the final moments, Utah found themselves down 20–12 on the Air Force 1-yard line. On 3rd-and-goal, Freshman RB Eddie Wide took a direct snap through the middle of the line only to be taken down for no gain. With time running down to under a minute to go the final chance to score came on 4th down. Darryl Poston took a hand-off to the right side of the line and was met by a swarm of Air Force defenders who stopped him just a couple feet short of the goal-line. Utah was handed their 2nd defeat of the season and began 0–2 for the first time since 2000.

=== UCLA ===
	1	2	3	4	Total
#11 Bruins	3	3	0	0	6
Utes	7	7	13	17	44

Having started the 2007 season 0–2, the Utes were off to their worst start since 2000, and with their starting QB, RB and star WR out to injury, their luck did not look like it was about to change against the #11 UCLA Bruins. The game started off with both teams scoring on their first possessions, Utah on a 53-yard touchdown pass from backup QB Tommy Grady to WR Marquis Wilson, and UCLA on a 45-yard field goal by Kai Forbath. The 2nd quarter was more of the same with Forbath kicking another 3 points onto the scoreboard for the Bruins from 52-yards out, and Grady finding RB Darrell Mack on a 12-yard touchdown pass just before the end of the 1st half.

Trailing 14–6 midway through the 3rd quarter it looked as though UCLA was about to get closer to the lead the Utes held when UCLA QB Ben Olson found a wide open Marcus Everett who looked to be on his way to the end-zone for a 52-yard touchdown reception. Ute safety, Robert Johnson caught up to Everett and hit him before he crossed the goal-line causing him to fumble the ball through the back of the end-zone for a touchback. "That really killed any momentum we had gained", said UCLA coach Karl Dorrell. The Utes took possession and dominated the rest of the game with the help of their defense forcing 5 total turnovers and keeping the Bruins scoreless throughout the 2nd half. RB Darrell Mack ended the game with 107-yards rushing on 19 carries, becoming the first Ute running back to rush for 100-yards in a single game since Quinton Ganther in the 2005 Emerald Bowl. This was the Utes' first win over the Bruins.

=== UNLV ===
	1	2	3	4	Total
Utes	0	0	0	0	0
Rebels	3	10	0	14	27

Coming off of one of the biggest wins in school history, the Utes next faced UNLV. Utah's offense struggled the entire game turning the ball over 4 times and never scored, being shut-out for the first time since 1993. Like their match against Oregon State, the Ute defense was dominated by a strong Rebel running attack. UNLV RB Frank Summers rushed for 190-yards and 2 TDs on 29 carries leading the way to the Rebel's first win over the Utes since 1979.

=== Utah State ===
	1	2	3	4	Total
Aggies	7	3	0	8	18
Utes	7	17	7	3	34

Utah State gave the Utes a scare, scoring first after Brian Johnson's pass to Jereme Brooks was taken away by James Brindley for an interception. Brooks would later redeem himself, catching his first career touchdown pass from Johnson, tying the game at 7 at the end of the first quarter. The Ute defense stopped the Aggies on their next possession, forcing them to punt. Derek Richards took the punt and returned it for a touchdown, the first punt returned for a score since Steve Smith against California in 2000. Utah would not trail again as Darrell Mack racked up 132-yards rushing and a TD on 26 carries. This victory marked the Utes' tenth straight against their oldest rival.

=== Louisville ===
	1	2	3	4	Total
Utes	14	13	7	10	44
Cardinals	0	7	14	14	35

=== San Diego State ===
	1	2	3	4	Total
Aztecs	0	7	0	0	7
Utes	3	6	14	0	23

=== TCU ===
	1	2	3	4	Total
Utes	10	14	0	3	27
Horned Frogs	0	17	0	3	20

=== Colorado State ===
	1	2	3	4	Total
Utes	14	6		7	27
Rams	3	0	0	0	3

=== Wyoming ===
	1	2	3	4	Total
Cowboys	0	0	0	0	0
Utes	10	30	3	7	50

=== New Mexico ===
	1	2	3	4	Total
Lobos	0	0	10	0	10
Utes	0	14	7	7	28

=== Brigham Young ===
	1	2	3	4	Total
Utes	0	0	3	7	10
Cougars	0	3	3	11	17

This rivalry game, unofficially dubbed "The Holy War," is typically the most anticipated conference game for each of these two teams. In 2006, the rivalry was ranked in the Wall Street Journal as the 4th best college football rivalry game in the country.

The game was largely a defensive struggle until the last few minutes of the fourth quarter. The Utes took the lead 10–9 when Darrell Mack scored the first touchdown of the game with just 1:34 left. On the ensuing possession, however, BYU converted on fourth and eighteen from their own 12 with a 49-yard pass from Max Hall to Austin Collie. Harvey Unga made the game-winning touchdown run with 38 seconds remaining, and Austin Collie caught a pass in the back of the end zone for a two-point conversion, putting the Cougars up 17–10. Unga became BYU's first freshman running back to gain 1,000 rushing yards in a season. This was also Collie's 6th game for over 97 yards receiving. BYU racked up 424 offensive yards to Utah's 244. Unga was named the MWC Offensive Player of the Week, and freshman kicker, Mitch Payne, was named MWC Special Teams Player of the Week making 3 of 4 field goals.

=== Navy ===
	1	2	3	4	Total
Utah	0	7	14	14	35
Navy	0	10	7	15	32

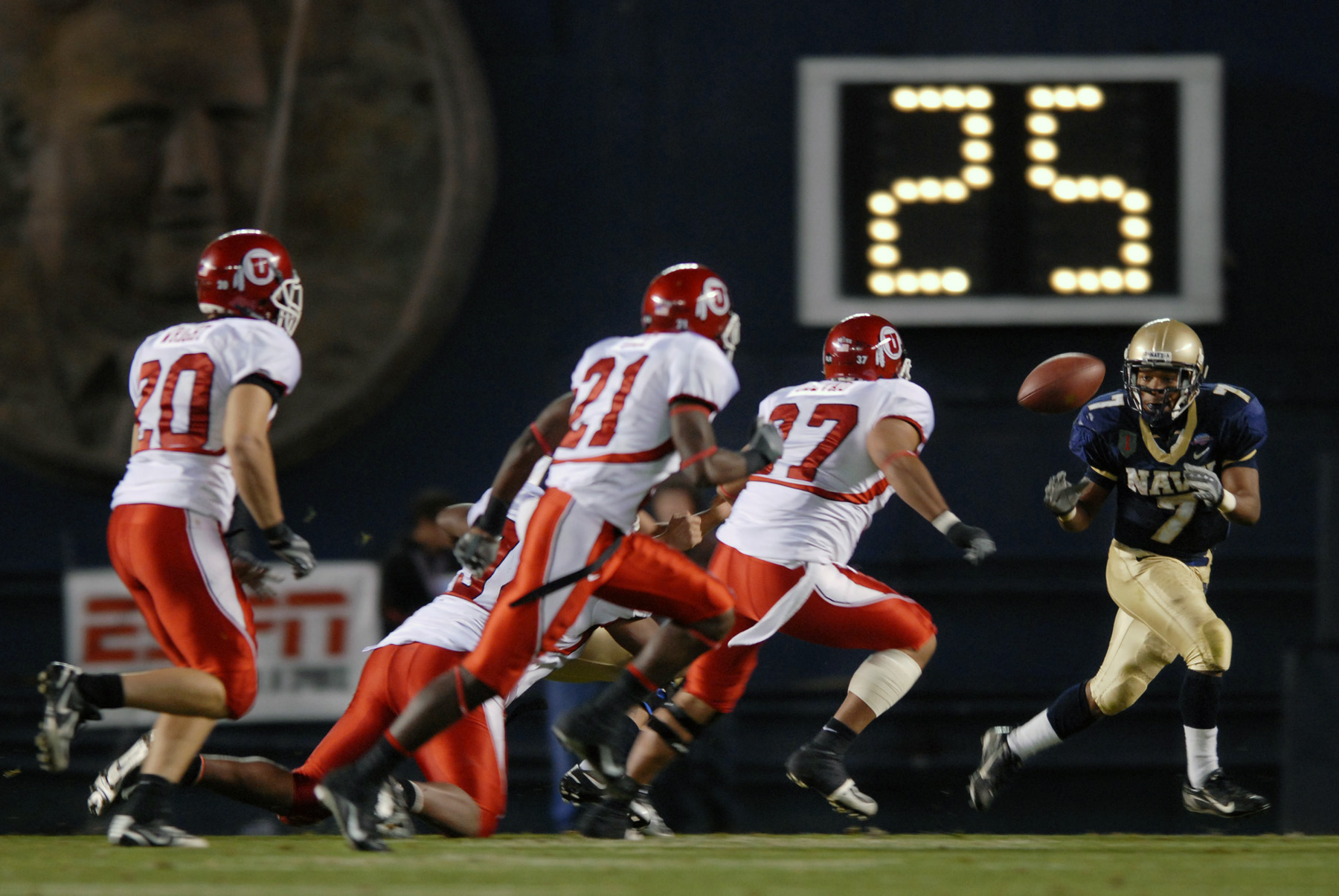
Utah defenders Loma Olevao, Damilyn Tanner, and Mike Wright pursue Reggie Campbell who is catching a pitch

Utah started this game looking for their seventh straight bowl win since 1999. They did just that, led by Quarterback Brian Johnson, who threw and ran for a touchdown to lead the Utes to a 35–32 win. He finished the day going 20–25 for 226 yards and the two touchdowns. Running back Darrell Mack ran for 76 yards on 22 carries and 2 touchdowns. The Midshipmen were led by Quarterback Kaipo-Noa Kaheaku-Enhada who went 7–14 for 122 yards, 2 touchdowns and just 1 interception. Fullback Eric Kettani carried the ball 12 times for 125 yards and 1 touchdown. Utah struck first on a 5-yard Mack run in the 2nd quarter. The Midshipmen then proceeded to score 17 straight points with 11:52 to play in the 3rd quarter. The Utes then struck back with three straight touchdowns including Brian Johnson's 19 yard scramble with 12:47 to go in the fourth quarter to make it 28–17 in favor of the Utes. Kaheaku-Enhada then hooked up with Shun White for a 10-yard pass that made it 28–25. Mack then had a 1-yard run to make it 35–25 with 1:27 to play. Kaheaku-Enhada then found Zerbin Singleton with 00:57 to play to make it 35–32. Navy then converted the onside kick. Utah safety Joe Dale then intercepted Kaheaku-Enhada to seal the Ute win.

== Personnel ==
=== Roster ===
Wide receiver

- 2 Marquis Wilson – Junior
- 3 John Peel – Junior
- 5 Brent Casteel – Junior
- 11 David Cravens – (redshirt) Freshman
- 12 Sam Ewalefo – (redshirt) Freshman
- 16 Brian Hernandez – Senior
- 19 Ben Macey – Freshman
- 21 Mychal Robinson – Freshman
- 26 Derrek Richards – Senior
- 81 Bradon Godfrey – Junior
- 82 A.J. Reilly – Freshman
- 85 Jereme Brooks – Freshman
- 86 Mike Hicken – (redshirt) Freshman
- 87 Collin Robinson – Freshman
- 88 Freddie Brown – Junior

Tight end

- 45 Colt Sampson – Junior
- 48 Matt Sims – Senior
- 80 Chris Joppru – Sophomore
- 83 Ben Hendy – Junior
- 84 Peter Tuitupou – Freshman
- 84 Brad Clifford – (redshirt) Freshman
- 89 Dallin Rogers – Freshman

Offensive line

- 57 Tyler Williams – Junior
- 62 Michael Steckling – Freshman
- 63 Kyle Gunther – Senior
- 64 Mike Lehr – Freshman
- 65 Dustin Hensel – Junior
- 66 Robert Conley – Junior
- 68 Zane Beadles – Sophomore
- 69 Jason Boone – Senior
- 70 Jordan Nelson – Freshman
- 71 Walter Watts – (redshirt) Freshman
- 72 Caleb Schlauderaff – (redshirt) Freshman
- 73 Daniel Bukarau – (redshirt) Freshman
- 74 Corey Seiuli – Junior
- 76 David Astle – (redshirt) Freshman
- 77 Zane Taylor – (redshirt) Freshman
- 78 Louie Finner – Freshman

Quarterback

- 3 Brian Johnson – Junior
- 8 Chad Mannis – Sophomore
- 12 Kyle Bowen – Freshman
- 15 Tommy Grady – Senior
- 19 Corbin Louks – Freshman

Running back

- 4 Matt Asiata – Junior
- 6 Darrell Mack – Junior
- 9 Darryl Poston – Senior
- 20 Jake Cook – Freshman
- 21 Trevor Moss – Sophomore
- 24 Ray Stowers – Junior
- 36 Eddie Wide – Freshman
- 40 Zac Eldridge – (redshirt) Freshman

Defensive line

- 11 Paul Kruger – (redshirt) Freshman
- 13 Alex Puccinelli – Senior
- 41 Koa Misi – Sophomore
- 42 Nai Fotu – Freshman
- 43 Lei Talamaivao – Freshman
- 49 Ryan Taylor – Senior
- 56 Greg Newman – Junior
- 58 Matt Black – Freshman
- 90 Kerrick Shelby – Freshman
- 91 Casey Sutera – Senior
- 92 Kenape Eliapo – Sophomore
- 93 Martail Burnett – Senior
- 94 Gabe Long – Senior
- 95 Neli A'asa – (redshirt) Freshman
- 96 Nano Tonga – Junior
- 97 Isley Filiaga – Sophomore
- 98 Aaron Tonga – Junior
- 99 Zeke Tuinei-Wily – Sophomore

Defensive back

- 1 Brice McCain – Junior
- 2 Lisiate Leota – Junior
- 4 Sean Smith – Sophomore
- 6 Nick Morrell – Freshman
- 7 RJ Rice – Junior
- 8 Elijah Wesson – Sophomore
- 12 Joe Dale – Sophomore
- 15 Nick Liefting – Freshman
- 17 Robert Johnson – Sophomore
- 18 Josh Broughton – Junior
- 21 Damilyn Tanner – Junior
- 23 Mookie Murphey – (redshirt) Freshman
- 24 Chaz Walker – Freshman
- 25 R.J. Stanford – Sophomore
- 27 Brandon Burton – Freshman
- 28 Steve Tate – Senior
- 29 Justin Jones – Sophomore
- 31 Deshawn Richard – Junior
- 33 Chris Jones – (redshirt) Freshman
- 34 Tysen Clements – (redshirt) Freshman
- 36 Tyler Cahoon – Freshman

Linebacker

- 10 Stevenson Sylvester – Sophomore
- 14 Kyle Brady – Senior
- 19 Matt Martinez – (redshirt) Freshman
- 20 Mike Wright – Sophomore
- 22 Malakai Mokofisi – Senior
- 37 Loma Olevao – Senior
- 38 Toby Titus – (redshirt) Freshman
- 44 Joe Jiannoni – Senior
- 46 Justin Taplin-Ross – Freshman
- 47 Kevin Freestone – Sophomore
- 48 Troy Bunting – Sophomore
- 50 Nate Empey – Sophomore
- 51 Jamel King – Freshman
- 52 Vilisoni Kotobalavu – (redshirt) Freshman
- 53 Mo Neal – Freshman
- 54 Christian Cox – Sophomore
- 55 Tatum Drecksel – Sophomore
- 59 Kepa Gaison – Sophomore

Long snapper

- 39 Clint Mower – Junior
- 60 Scott Coleman – Junior

Kicker / Punter

- 30 Ben Vroman – Junior
- 35 Louie Sakoda – Junior
- 59 Mike Langston – Freshman

=== Recruiting ===
College recruiting information
Name	Hometown	School	Height	Weight	40^{‡}	Commit date
Griffin Robles; QB	Spanish Fork, Utah	Spanish Fork HS	6 ft 5 in (1.96 m)	210 lb (95 kg)	4.86	Jun 5, 2006
Griffin Robles; QB	Recruit ratings: Scout: Rivals: (77)					
Corbin Louks; QB	Danville, California	San Ramon Valley HS	6 ft 1 in (1.85 m)	173 lb (78 kg)	4.53	Jan 15, 2007
Corbin Louks; QB	Recruit ratings: Scout: Rivals: (72)					
Dallin Rogers; TE	El Dorado, California	Union Mine HS	6 ft 4 in (1.93 m)	200 lb (91 kg)	4.85	Aug 14, 2006
Dallin Rogers; TE	Recruit ratings: Scout: Rivals: (71)					
James Aiono; DE	Murray, Utah	Murray HS	6 ft 4 in (1.93 m)	225 lb (102 kg)	4.9	Jun 15, 2006
James Aiono; DE	Recruit ratings: Scout: Rivals: (70)					
Jereme Brooks; WR	League City, Texas	Clear Creek HS	5 ft 9 in (1.75 m)	165 lb (75 kg)	4.45	Feb 7, 2007
Jereme Brooks; WR	Recruit ratings: Scout: Rivals: (40)					
Brandon Burton; CB	League City, Texas	Clear Creek HS	6 ft 0 in (1.83 m)	170 lb (77 kg)	4.5	Feb 7, 2007
Brandon Burton; CB	Recruit ratings: Scout: Rivals: (40)					
Louis Finner; OG	Plano, Texas	Plano East Sr. HS	6 ft 3 in (1.91 m)	295 lb (134 kg)	5.39	Aug 9, 2006
Louis Finner; OG	Recruit ratings: Scout: Rivals: (40)					
Nai Fotu; ILB	Kahuku, HI	Kahuku HS	5 ft 11 in (1.80 m)	240 lb (110 kg)	NA	Feb 7, 2007
Nai Fotu; ILB	Recruit ratings: Scout: Rivals: (40)					
Mike Honeycutt; CB	Highland, Utah	Lone Peak HS	5 ft 10 in (1.78 m)	165 lb (75 kg)	NA	Nov 28, 2006
Mike Honeycutt; CB	Recruit ratings: Scout: Rivals: (40)					
Jamel King; ILB	Murrieta, California	Vista Murrieta HS	6 ft 3 in (1.91 m)	230 lb (100 kg)	4.6	Feb 7, 2007
Jamel King; ILB	Recruit ratings: Scout: Rivals: (40)					
Maurice Neal; OLB	San Leandro, California	San Leandro HS	6 ft 2 in (1.88 m)	200 lb (91 kg)	4.5	Feb 7, 2007
Maurice Neal; OLB	Recruit ratings: Scout: Rivals: (40)					
Thor Salanoa; CB	Honolulu, HI	Radford HS	6 ft 2 in (1.88 m)	170 lb (77 kg)	4.66	Jan 24, 2007
Thor Salanoa; CB	Recruit ratings: Scout: Rivals: (40)					
Derrick Shelby; DE	Missouri City, Texas	Hightower HS	6 ft 3 in (1.91 m)	200 lb (91 kg)	4.6	Feb 7, 2007
Derrick Shelby; DE	Recruit ratings: Scout: Rivals: (40)					
Lei Talamaivao; DT	Rancho Cucamongo, California	Rancho Cucamongo HS	6 ft 3 in (1.91 m)	270 lb (120 kg)	4.7	Jan 15, 2007
Lei Talamaivao; DT	Recruit ratings: Scout: Rivals: (40)					
Justin Taplin-Ross; S	Murrieta, California	Vista Murrieta HS	6 ft 3 in (1.91 m)	185 lb (84 kg)	4.6	Feb 7, 2007
Justin Taplin-Ross; S	Recruit ratings: Scout: Rivals: (40)					
Westlee Tonga; TE	Spring, Texas		6 ft 4 in (1.93 m)	220 lb (100 kg)	4.6	Feb 7, 2007
Westlee Tonga; TE	Recruit ratings: Scout: Rivals: (40)					
Reggie Topps; CB	Monterey, California	North Monterey County HS	5 ft 10 in (1.78 m)	165 lb (75 kg)	4.4	Feb 7, 2007
Reggie Topps; CB	Recruit ratings: Scout: Rivals: (40)					
Eddie Wide; RB	Las Vegas, Nevada	Cimarron-Memorial HS	5 ft 10 in (1.78 m)	170 lb (77 kg)	4.365	Jan 14, 2007
Eddie Wide; RB	Recruit ratings: Scout: Rivals: (40)					
Overall recruit ranking:
‡ Refers to 40-yard dash; Note: In many cases, Scout, Rivals, 247Sports, On3, and ESPN may conflict in their listings of height, weight and 40 time.; In these cases, the average was taken. ESPN grades are on a 100-point scale.; Sources: "2007 Team Ranking". Rivals.com.

== Statistical leaders ==
Passing
Player	COMP	ATT	Pct.	YDS	TD	INT	QB rating
Brian Johnson	111	162	68.5	1160	8	5	138.8
Tommy Grady	57	114	53.6	662	4	3	105.1

Rushing
Player	ATT	YDS	YPC	TD
Darrell Mack	254	1126	5.0	6
Ray Stowers	35	215	6.1	1
Corbin Louks	17	90	5.3	1

Receiving
Player	REC	YDS	YPC	TD
Derrek Richards	37	413	11.2	1
Bradon Godfrey	33	337	10.2	0
Brian Hernandez	28	302	10.8	0

Tackles
Player	Solo	Asst	Total
