= 2007 Texas Bowl =

- 2007 Texas Bowl logo
| TCU Horned Frogs | Houston Cougars |
| (7–5) | (8–4) |
| Mountain West | C-USA |
| 20 | 13 |
| Head coach: Gary Patterson | Head coach: Chris Thurmond (interim) |
| | 1 | 2 | 3 | 4 | Total |
|---|---|---|---|---|---|
| TCU | 0 | 7 | 3 | 10 | 20 |
| Houston | 7 | 3 | 0 | 3 | 13 |
- Date: December 28, 2007
- Season: 2007
- Stadium: Reliant Stadium
- Location: Houston, Texas
- MVP: TCU QB Andy Dalton
- Favorite: TCU by 4
- National anthem: Stoney LaRue
- Referee: David Witvoet (Big Ten)
- Attendance: 62,097

United States TV coverage
- Network: NFL Network
- Announcers: Brad Sham, Mike Mayock, Charles Davis, and Kim Jones

The 2007 Texas Bowl, part of the 2007–08 NCAA football bowl games season, was played on December 28, 2007 at Reliant Stadium in Houston, Texas.

The matchup had different conference representatives from the inaugural 2006 game (itself the revival of the old Houston Bowl). This time, the teams were the TCU Horned Frogs of the Mountain West Conference and the hometown University of Houston from Conference USA. The original plan was C-USA versus Big 12, but the Big 12 did not have enough teams eligible for bowl games to fill the remaining slots after Oklahoma won the conference title and Kansas was selected at-large to the Orange Bowl.

TCU and Houston had been conference rivals for many years: between 1976 and 1995, they were in the Southwest Conference, and from 2001 to 2004, TCU joined Houston in C-USA. This was their first meeting in a bowl game.

The Cougars were led by interim head coach Chris Thurmond after Art Briles left the program at the conclusion of the regular season to take a similar job at Baylor.

Radio Shack, the electronics store chain based in Fort Worth, Texas, was the presenting sponsor of the NFL Network telecast.

The Horned Frogs won the game 20–13, giving the Cougars their eighth straight bowl loss - at the time the second longest streak in the NCAA (and tied for second-longest streak in NCAA history).

== Statistics ==
| Statistics | TCU | HOU |
|---|---|---|
| First downs | 19 | 20 |
| Plays–yards | 70–365 | 68–367 |
| Rushes–yards | 39–116 | 30–32 |
| Passing yards | 249 | 335 |
| Passing: Comp–Att–Int | 21–31–1 | 23–38–0 |
| Time of possession | 31:32 | 28:28 |
