= Bradon Godfrey =

American football player (born 1985)

Profile
- Position: Wide receiver

Personal information
- Born: October 17, 1985 (age 41); Layton, Utah, U.S.
- Listed height: 6 ft 3 in (1.91 m)
- Listed weight: 197 lb (89 kg)

Career information
- College: Utah
- NFL draft: 2009: undrafted

Career history
- Atlanta Falcons (2009)*; Baltimore Ravens (2009)*
- * Offseason or practice squad member only

Bradon Cache Godfrey (born October 17, 1985) is an American former football wide receiver. He was signed by the Atlanta Falcons as an undrafted free agent in 2009. He played college football at Utah.

Godfrey was also a member of the Baltimore Ravens.

== College career ==
Godfrey finished his college career with 128 receptions for 1,440 yards and eight touchdowns in 36 career games.

== Professional career ==
=== Atlanta Falcons ===
After going undrafted in the 2009 NFL draft, Godfrey was signed by the Atlanta Falcons as an undrafted free agent. He was waived on August 6 to make room for veteran wide receiver Marty Booker.

=== Baltimore Ravens ===
Godfrey was signed by the Baltimore Ravens on August 15, 2009. He was waived on August 31.
