= Chase Ortiz =

American gridiron football player (born 1985)

No. 56
- Position: Defensive end

Personal information
- Born: May 22, 1985 (age 41); League City, Texas, U.S.
- Listed height: 6 ft 3 in (1.91 m)
- Listed weight: 255 lb (116 kg)

Career information
- College: Texas Christian
- NFL draft: 2008: undrafted

Career history
- Cleveland Browns (2008)*; Winnipeg Blue Bombers (2009)
- * Offseason or practice squad member only

Awards and highlights
- 3× First-team All-MW (2005, 2006, 2007)

Chase Patrick Ortiz (born May 22, 1985) is a former professional American and Canadian Football defensive end. He was signed by the Cleveland Browns as an undrafted free agent in 2008. He played college football for the TCU Horned Frogs.

== Early life ==
Ortiz played linebacker at Clear Creek High School in League City, Texas before deciding to play for the Horned Frogs.

== College career ==
He redshirted during his first year at TCU in 2003 and did not see any playing time in 2004, either. During this time, he switched to defensive end, his current position. In 2005, he began the year 3rd on the depth chart, but impressed coaches enough during fall practice that he became a starter before the season opener, a 17-10 TCU win at Oklahoma. That year, he led the Mountain West Conference with nine sacks, and was named 1st Team All-MWC. As a junior in 2006, he repeated as 1st Team All-MWC, as did the Frogs' other defensive end, Tommy Blake. Heading into his senior year, Ortiz has been named to the All-Texas College Team by Dave Campbell's Texas Football.

== Professional career ==
Ortiz signed with the Winnipeg Blue Bombers on May 26, 2009. He was released on June 25, 2009. He was re-signed to the practice roster on October 8.
