= 2007 Air Force Falcons football team =

American college football season

2007 Air Force Falcons football

Armed Forces Bowl, L 36–42 vs. California
- Conference: Mountain West Conference
- Record: 9–4 (6–2 MW)
- Head coach: Troy Calhoun (1st season)
- Co-offensive coordinators: Clay Hendrix (1st season); Blane Morgan (1st season)
- Offensive scheme: Triple option
- Defensive coordinator: Tim DeRuyter (1st season)
- Base defense: 3–4
- Captain: Game captains
- Home stadium: Falcon Stadium

2007 Mountain West Conference football standings
	Conf.			Overall
Team	W		L	W		L
No. 14 BYU $	8	–	0	11	–	2
Air Force	6	–	2	9	–	4
New Mexico	5	–	3	9	–	4
Utah	5	–	3	9	–	4
TCU	4	–	4	8	–	5
San Diego State	3	–	5	4	–	8
Wyoming	2	–	6	5	–	7
Colorado State	2	–	6	3	–	9
UNLV	1	–	7	2	–	10
$ – Conference champion; Rankings from AP Poll

The 2007 Air Force Falcons football team represented the United States Air Force Academy as a member of the Mountain West Conference (MW) during the 2007 NCAA Division I FBS football season. Led by first-year head coach Troy Calhoun, the Falcons compiled an overall record of 9–4 with a mark of 6–2 in conference play, placing second in the MW. Air Force was invited to the Armed Forces Bowl, where the Falcons lost to California. The team played home games at Falcon Stadium in Colorado Springs, Colorado

== Schedule ==
Date	Time	Opponent	Site	TV	Result	Attendance	Source
September 1	12:00 p.m.	South Carolina State*	Falcon Stadium; Colorado Springs, CO	mtn.	W 34–3	39,364	
September 8	4:00 p.m.	at Utah	Rice–Eccles Stadium; Salt Lake City, UT	mtn.	W 20–12	43,454	
September 13	6:00 p.m.	TCU	Falcon Stadium; Colorado Springs, CO	CSTV	W 20–17 ^{OT}	31,556	
September 22	1:00 p.m.	at BYU	LaVell Edwards Stadium; Provo, UT	mtn.	L 6–31	64,502	
September 29	11:00 a.m.	at Navy*	Navy–Marine Corps Memorial Stadium; Annapolis, MD	CSTV	L 20–31	37,615	
October 6	7:00 p.m.	UNLV	Falcon Stadium; Colorado Springs, CO	mtn.	W 31–14	35,583	
October 13	3:30 p.m.	at Colorado State	Hughes Stadium; Fort Collins, CO (rivalry)	mtn.	W 45–21	25,150	
October 20	12:00 p.m.	Wyoming	Falcon Stadium; Colorado Springs, CO	mtn.	W 20–12	41,531	
October 25	7:00 p.m.	at New Mexico	University Stadium; Albuquerque, NM	Versus	L 31–34	26,087	
November 3	1:30 p.m.	Army*	Falcon Stadium; Colorado Springs, CO	CSTV	W 30–10	46,144	
November 10	12:30 p.m.	at Notre Dame*	Notre Dame Stadium; Notre Dame, IN (rivalry)	NBC	W 41–24	80,795	
November 17	12:00 p.m.	San Diego State	Falcon Stadium; Colorado Springs, CO		W 55–23	34,227	
December 31	10:30 a.m.	vs. California*	Amon G. Carter Stadium; Fort Worth, TX (Armed Forces Bowl)	ESPN	L 36–42	40,905	
*Non-conference game; All times are in Mountain time

== Game summaries ==
=== South Carolina State ===
	1	2	3	4	Total
Bulldogs	0	3	0	0	3
Falcons	7	17	7	3	34

=== Utah ===
	1	2	3	4	Total
Falcons	0	3	7	10	20
Utes	3	0	3	6	12

=== TCU ===
	1	2	3	4	OT	Total
Horned Frogs	3	7	0	7	0	17
Falcons	0	3	0	14	3	20

=== BYU ===
	1	2	3	4	Total
Falcons	0	0	6	0	6
Cougars	7	10	7	7	31

=== Navy ===
	1	2	3	4	Total
Falcons	3	7	10	0	20
Midshipmen	0	14	3	14	31

=== UNLV ===
	1	2	3	4	Total
Rebels	0	7	0	7	14
Falcons	7	0	14	10	31

=== Colorado State ===
	1	2	3	4	Total
Falcons	14	14	10	7	45
Rams	7	0	7	7	21

=== Wyoming ===
	1	2	3	4	Total
Cowboys	6	3	0	3	12
Falcons	0	7	0	13	20

=== New Mexico ===
	1	2	3	4	Total
Falcons	7	14	10	0	31
Lobos	10	11	7	6	34

=== Army ===
	1	2	3	4	Total
Black Knights	3	7	0	0	10
Falcons	3	14	7	6	30

=== Notre Dame ===
	1	2	3	4	Total
Falcons	10	7	14	10	41
Fighting Irish	0	10	0	14	24

=== San Diego State ===
	1	2	3	4	Total
Aztecs	7	10	6	0	23
Falcons	14	14	21	6	55

=== Armed Forces Bowl ===
	1	2	3	4	Total
Golden Bears	0	14	14	14	42
Falcons	7	14	6	9	36

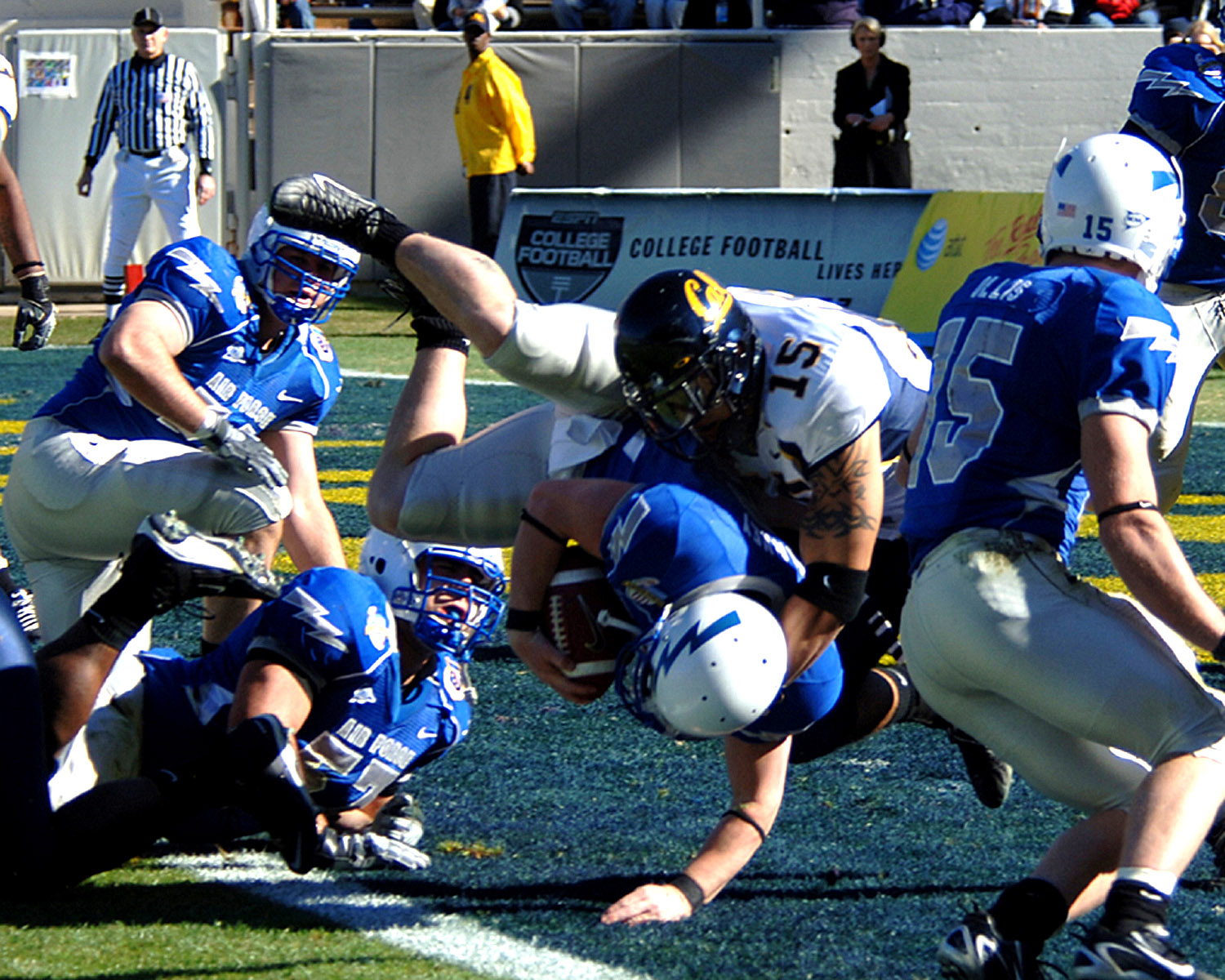
Falcons quarterback Shaun Carney falls into the end zone for a first-quarter touchdown.

== Personnel ==
=== Coaching staff ===
Name	Position	Year at Air Force	Alma mater (year)
Troy Calhoun	Head coach	1st	Air Force (1989)
Brian Knorr	Assistant head coach Inside linebackers	6th	Air Force (1986)
Tim Horton	Offensive coordinator Wide receivers	8th	Arkansas (1990)
Tim DeRuyter	Defensive coordinator Safeties	5th	Air Force (1985)
Clay Hendrix	Offensive line	1st	Furman (1986)
Ron Burton	Defensive line	5th	North Carolina (1987)
Charlton Warren	Cornerbacks; Recruiting coordinator	3rd	Air Force (1999)
Jemal Singleton	Running backs	5th	Air Force (1999)
Blane Morgan	Quarterbacks	6th	Air Force (1999)
Ben Miller	Tight ends	2nd	Air Force (2002)
Matt Weikert	Outside linebackers	1st	Ohio (2002)
Patrick Covington	Offensive assistant	1st	Furman, (2006)
Matt McGettigan	Strength and conditioning	1st	Luther College (1987)

=== Roster ===
Quarterbacks: 5 Shaun Carney – Senior; 8 Eric Herbort – Sophomore; 14 Shea Smith – Junior; 13 Will McAngus – Freshman; Tailbacks: 15 Jim Ollis – Senior; 17 Kip McCarthy – Senior; 18 Devon Ford – Sophomore; 22 Brenton Byrd – Sophomore; 24 Chad Smith – Senior; 38 Kevin Van Hook – Sophomore; Fullbacks: 21 Ryan Williams – Senior; 25 Todd Newell – Junior; 40 Scott Peeples – Senior; 43 Justin Moore – Sophomore; Wide receivers: 1 Chad Hall – Senior; 7 Mark Root -Senior; 10 Devin Hart -Junior; 12 Mike Moffett -Senior; 16 Matt Davis -Junior; 19 Ty Paffett -Junior; 26 Spencer Armstrong -Junior; 27 Trey Eaton -Junior; 28 Dal Shealy -Sophomore; 80 Anthony Hemphill -Sophomore; 81 Sean Quintana -Sophomore; 83 Kyle Halderman -Freshman; 87 Josh Cousins -Sophomore; Tight ends: 82 Michael Krogh -Senior; 84 Steve Shaffer -Freshman; 85 Keith Madsen -Junior; 86 Chris Evans -Senior; 88 Travis Dekker -Junior	Offensive guards: 57 Nick Charles -Sophomore; 62 Peter Lusk -Sophomore; 66 Ben Leung -Freshman; 67 Tyler Weeks -Junior; 68 Kyle Knight -Sophomore; 69 Caleb Morris -Senior; 71 Austin Fallin -Sophomore; Offensive tackles: 60 Chris Campbell -Sophomore; 64 Blaine Guenther -Senior; 70 Matt Markling -Freshman; 72 Richard Meldrum -Sophomore; 73 Dan Holder -Senior; 74 Chris Monson -Senior; 75 Anthony Schelstrate -Sophomore; 77 Bryce Waller -Sophomore; 78 Duncan Thompson -Sophomore	Defensive ends: 78 Rick Ricketts -Freshman; 79 Keith Williams -Junior; 91 Ryan Kemp -Junior; 92 Myles Morales -Sophomore; 95 Jake Paulson -Junior; 96 Adam Page -Sophomore; 97 Josh Clayton -Senior; 99 Garrett Gilbertson -Junior; Defensive tackles: 49 Ryan Gonzalez -Sophomore; 56 Jared Marvin -Junior; 76 Stephen Larson -Junior; 93 Ben Garland -Sophomore; Linebackers: 4 Julian Madrid -Senior; 9 John Rabold -Senior; 20 Dan Hill -Sophomore; 31 Patrick Hennessey -Freshman; 32 Hunter Altman -Junior; 33 Drew Fowler -Senior; 35 Chamberlain Herndon -Sophomore; 36 Andre Morris Jr. -Freshman; 41 William Keuchler -Freshman; 45 John Falgout -Sophomore; 47 Reinhold Leicht -Sophomore; 48 Brandon Reeves -Junior; 51 Aaron Shanor -Senior; 52 Austin Randle -Senior; 53 Ken Lamendola -Freshman; 54 Blaine Hainbach -Sophomore; 55 Clayton Bryant -Sophomore	Cornerbacks: 2 Carson Bird -Senior; 3 Nathan Smith -Senior; 6 Kevin Rivers -Junior; 8 Reggie Rembert -Freshman; 38 Stephan Atrice -Freshman; 39 Garrett Rybak -Senior; 46 Eric Collins -Freshman; Safeties: 11 Bobby Giannini -Senior; 23 Aaron Kirchoff -Junior; 29 Luke Hyder -Sophomore; 30 Luke Yeager -Junior; 34 Chris Thomas -Sophomore; 44 Boston McClain -Junior; Punters: 13 Ryan Harrison -Junior; 98 Brandon Geyer -Sophomore; Placekickers: 13 Ryan Harrison -Junior; 27 Trey Eaton -Junior; 92 Chad Gross -Freshman; 94 Zack Bell -Freshman; Deep snappers: 37 Tony Norman -Senior; 50 Scott Howley -Junior; 59 John Dolan -Sophomore
