= Brian Johnson (American football coach) =

American football player and coach (born 1987)

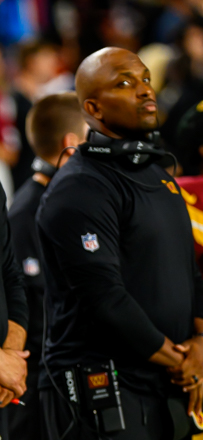
- Johnson with the Washington Commanders in 2025

Los Angeles Rams
- Title: Senior offensive assistant

Personal information
- Born: February 16, 1987 (age 39); Barrett Station, Texas, U.S.
- Listed height: 6 ft 1 in (1.85 m)
- Listed weight: 211 lb (96 kg)

Career information
- Position: Quarterback
- High school: Robert E. Lee (Baytown, Texas)
- College: Utah (2004–2008)
- NFL draft: 2009: undrafted

Career history

Playing
- New York Sentinels (2009)

Coaching
- Utah (2010–2013); Quarterbacks coach (2010–2011); Offensive coordinator & quarterbacks coach (2012–2013); Mississippi State (2014–2016) Quarterbacks coach; Houston (2017) Offensive coordinator & quarterbacks coach; Florida (2018–2020); Quarterbacks coach (2018–2019); Offensive coordinator & quarterbacks coach (2020); Philadelphia Eagles (2021–2023); Quarterbacks coach (2021–2022); Offensive coordinator (2023); Washington Commanders (2024–2025) Assistant head coach & offensive pass game coordinator; Los Angeles Rams (2026–present) Senior offensive assistant

Awards and highlights
- MW Offensive Player of the Year (2008); First-team All-MW (2008)
- Coaching profile at Pro Football Reference

Brian Delance Johnson (born February 16, 1987) is an American professional football coach and former quarterback who is a senior offensive assistant for the Los Angeles Rams of the National Football League (NFL). He was previously an offensive coordinator for the NCAA's Utah Utes, Houston Cougars, and Florida Gators and the NFL's Philadelphia Eagles. Johnson played college football at Utah and was briefly a member of the United Football League's (UFL) New York Sentinels in 2009.

== Early life ==
Johnson was born on February 16, 1987, in Barrett Station, Texas. He attended Robert E. Lee High School, where he lettered in football and basketball. During his senior year in 2003, in which he became the starting quarterback over Drew Tate, Johnson passed for 2,900 yards and 33 touchdowns and rushed for 540 yards with 12 touchdowns. Johnson was named the district's Most Valuable Player, first-team all-district, and second-team all-state. After graduating early, Johnson was a two-star recruit coming out of high school, not being ranked among the top quarterback prospects of his class. Johnson was recruited by Utah, Illinois and Louisiana Tech.

== Playing career ==
=== College ===
Johnson played college football for the Utah Utes. As a true freshman in 2004, Johnson saw action in ten games as backup to Heisman Trophy finalist Alex Smith. He tossed for a touchdown and ran for another, with a 129.7 passer rating.

In 2005, Johnson took over as starting quarterback, where he remained for the first ten games until a knee injury against New Mexico ended his season on November 12. He finished the season with 2,892 passing yards and 18 touchdowns. Against Wyoming, he was named the Mountain West Conference (MWC) Offensive Player of the Week for completing 32-of-45 passes for 384 yards and four touchdowns, while rushing for 67 yards and a touchdown. He was first in the MWC and fourth nationwide in total offensive yards with an average 337.0 yards per game, and second in the MWC in passing yardage with 289.2 yards per game. The Utes' record with Johnson at quarterback in 2005 was 5–5, before ultimately finishing the season 7–5.

After undergoing surgery on December 1, 2005, to correct his knee injury, Johnson redshirted his third year in order to convalesce during the 2006 season. In 2007, Johnson returned to see action in 11 games, ten of which he started. In the first game of the season against Oregon State, he injured his shoulder and subsequently missed two following games. He finished the season with 2,636 passing yards and 24 touchdowns. In the 2007 Poinsettia Bowl against Navy, Johnson completed 20-of-25 passes for 226 yards and a touchdown, while he rushed for 69 yards and one touchdown. For his performance, he was named the 2007 Poinsettia Bowl's Most Valuable Player.

In 2008, Johnson returned for his final season as the Utes' starting quarterback. In the first game against Rich Rodriguez's Michigan, he threw for 305 yards in Utah's 25–23 win. They went on to compile wins against Air Force, Oregon State (who defeated USC the previous week), and twelfth-ranked TCU, a team that only had one other loss in the season (against future BCS Championship Game participant second-ranked Oklahoma.) In their final regular season game against fourteenth-ranked BYU, Johnson threw for 303 yards and four touchdowns in a 48–24 victory. Utah's performance secured the sixth rank in the Bowl Championship Series (BCS) poll, and they became the only BCS non-AQ conference team to secure a berth in a BCS game (the 2009 Sugar Bowl, against Southeastern Conference (SEC) Western Division champions Alabama.)

In the Sugar Bowl, Johnson led seventh ranked Utah with 336 passing yards and three passing touchdowns in a 31–17 surprise upset over fourth ranked Alabama. For his performance, Johnson was named the 2009 Sugar Bowl's Most Outstanding Player. Utah finished the season as the only undefeated team, with a 13–0 record. Johnson was featured as the cover athlete of the PlayStation 3 edition of the NCAA Football 10 video game.

Johnson's record as a starting quarterback in his career at Utah was 26–7, which made him the winningest quarterback in school history.

=== College statistics ===
			Passing								Rushing	
Season	GP	Rating	Comp	Att	Pct	Yds	TD	INT	Sack	Att	Yds	TD
2004	7	124.42	13	20	65	126	1	1	2	21	92	1
2005	10	151.01	210	330	63.6	2892	18	7	26	152	478	8
2006	Did not play due to injury											
2007	11	129.61	181	272	66.5	1848	11	10	21	85	150	2
2008	13	149.43	268	394	68.0	2972	27	9	26	108	128	1
Career	41	138.62	672	1,016	66.14	7,838	57	27	75	366	848	12

=== Professional ===
Pre-draft measurables
Height	Weight	40-yard dash	10-yard split	20-yard split	20-yard shuttle	Three-cone drill	Vertical jump	Broad jump
6 ft 0 5/8 in (1.84 m)	211 lb (96 kg)	4.88 s	1.62 s	2.83 s	4.41 s	7.09 s	28.5 in (0.72 m)	8 ft 6 in (2.59 m)
All values from Pro Day

After going undrafted in the 2009 NFL draft, he was invited to the Green Bay Packers' rookie minicamp, along with Tulsa quarterback David Johnson. He was not signed by an NFL team, but the Winnipeg Blue Bombers of the Canadian Football League were reportedly interested in him. Johnson was selected in the inaugural United Football League (UFL) draft by the New York Sentinels. He signed with the team on August 5, 2009, but was released on September 28, 2009.

== Coaching career ==
=== Utah Utes ===
In January 2010, Johnson was named the quarterbacks coach at the University of Utah. On February 2, 2012, two weeks before his 25th birthday, Johnson was named offensive coordinator at Utah by Whittingham.

=== Mississippi State Bulldogs ===
On February 10, 2014, Johnson was named as the quarterbacks coach at Mississippi State, reuniting him with coach Dan Mullen. Mullen had offered him a scholarship to sign with Utah during Urban Meyer's tenure as the Utes' head coach.

=== Houston Cougars ===
On December 27, 2016, Johnson was hired as the offensive coordinator and quarterbacks coach for the Houston Cougars.

=== Florida Gators ===
On December 10, 2017, Johnson was hired as the quarterbacks coach at the University of Florida, once again reuniting with head coach Dan Mullen. Johnson was promoted to offensive coordinator in 2020, making him the first African-American offensive coordinator in the team's history.

=== Philadelphia Eagles ===
On January 27, 2021, Johnson was hired by the Philadelphia Eagles as their quarterbacks coach under head coach Nick Sirianni. Johnson was promoted to offensive coordinator in 2023, replacing Shane Steichen who departed to become head coach of the Indianapolis Colts.

Despite leading the team to a top ten offense, Johnson's play calling was criticized throughout the 2023 season, with pundits and players calling his offense too simplistic and akin to a Madden offense with the way he repeatedly relied on screen passes and go routes instead of scheming players open. The Eagles started with a 10-1 record, but suffered a late-season collapse by losing five of their last six games to finish 11–6, and proceeded to lose in the Wild Card round to the Tampa Bay Buccaneers. Johnson was fired following the season.

=== Washington Commanders ===
On February 15, 2024, Johnson was hired by the Washington Commanders as their assistant head coach and offensive pass game coordinator under head coach Dan Quinn.

=== Los Angeles Rams ===
On February 23, 2026, Johnson was hired by the Los Angeles Rams as a senior offensive assistant under head coach Sean McVay.
