= 2007 BYU Cougars football team =

American college football season

2007 BYU Cougars football

Mountain West champion Las Vegas Bowl champion

Las Vegas Bowl, W 17–16 vs. UCLA
- Conference: Mountain West Conference

Ranking
- Coaches: No. 14
- AP: No. 14
- Record: 11–2 (8–0 MW)
- Head coach: Bronco Mendenhall (3rd season)
- Offensive coordinator: Robert Anae (3rd season)
- Offensive scheme: Air raid
- Base defense: 3–3–5
- Home stadium: LaVell Edwards Stadium (Capacity: 64,045)

2007 Mountain West Conference football standings
	Conf.			Overall
Team	W		L	W		L
No. 14 BYU $	8	–	0	11	–	2
Air Force	6	–	2	9	–	4
New Mexico	5	–	3	9	–	4
Utah	5	–	3	9	–	4
TCU	4	–	4	8	–	5
San Diego State	3	–	5	4	–	8
Wyoming	2	–	6	5	–	7
Colorado State	2	–	6	3	–	9
UNLV	1	–	7	2	–	10
$ – Conference champion; Rankings from AP Poll

The 2007 BYU Cougars football team represented Brigham Young University (BYU) in the 2007 NCAA Division I FBS football season. BYU clinched its second consecutive Mountain West Conference (MWC) championship title outright after defeating Utah on November 24. It was BYU's second consecutive, undefeated season in the MWC, its fourth MWC championship since the league began in 1999, and its 23rd conference title. At the beginning of the season the Cougars had won an MWC record 16 straight league games dating back to 2005 and were on a ten-game overall winning streak, the longest winning streak in the country at the time. The Cougars began the season with the second longest winning streak in the country at 11 wins until their loss to UCLA in the second regular season game. The Cougars ended this season ranked 14th in the nation, highest of all schools from non-AQ conferences. This finish was the highest back-to-back rankings in the AP Poll since the Cougars won the national championship in 1984.

The Cougars improved their bowl record for the second year in a row. They defeated UCLA 17-16 in 2007 and blew out the Oregon Ducks 38–8 in 2006 in the Las Vegas Bowl at Sam Boyd Stadium in Las Vegas, Nevada.

The Cougars played their home games at LaVell Edwards Stadium, named after its legendary coach, LaVell Edwards.

== Schedule ==
Date	Time	Opponent	Rank	Site	TV	Result	Attendance	Source
September 1	3:30 pm	Arizona*		LaVell Edwards Stadium; Provo, UT	Versus	W 20–7	64,525	
September 8	4:30 pm	at No. 13 UCLA*		Rose Bowl Stadium; Pasadena, CA	Versus	L 17–27	72,968	
September 15	7:00 pm	at Tulsa*		Skelly Field at H. A. Chapman Stadium; Tulsa, OK	CSTV	L 47–55	24,445	
September 22	1:00 pm	Air Force^{†}		LaVell Edwards Stadium; Provo, UT	mtn.	W 31–6	64,502	
September 29	6:30 pm	at New Mexico		University Stadium; Albuquerque, NM	CSTV	W 31–24	34,204	
October 13	7:30 pm	at UNLV		Sam Boyd Stadium; Las Vegas, NV	mtn.	W 24–14	38,026	
October 20	3:30 pm	Eastern Washington*		LaVell Edwards Stadium; Provo, UT	mtn.	W 42–7	64,522	
November 3	12:00 pm	Colorado State		LaVell Edwards Stadium; Provo, UT	mtn.	W 35–16	64,441	
November 8	7:00 pm	TCU		LaVell Edwards Stadium; Provo, UT	Versus	W 27–22	64,241	
November 17	12:00 pm	at Wyoming		War Memorial Stadium; Laramie, WY	mtn.	W 35–10	19,827	
November 24	12:00 pm	Utah	No. 23	LaVell Edwards Stadium; Provo, UT (Holy War, Beehive Boot)	Versus/CSTV/mtn.	W 17–10	64,749	
December 1	4:30 pm	at San Diego State	No. 21	Qualcomm Stadium; San Diego, CA	mtn.	W 48–27	28,473	
December 22	6:00 pm	vs. UCLA*	No. 19	Sam Boyd Stadium; Las Vegas, NV (Las Vegas Bowl)	ESPN	W 17–16	40,712	
*Non-conference game; ^{†}Homecoming; Rankings from AP Poll released prior to the game; All times are in Mountain time

== Preseason ==
Spring practice started March 19 and ended April 14 at the annual Blue/White Spring game. The key question was who will fill the empty quarterback position left behind by John Beck: Max Hall, a redshirt sophomore, or Cade Cooper, a junior college transfer from Snow College. On the third snap during the April 14 scrimmage, Cooper suffered a season-ending injury (Lisfranc fracture). Hall was named the starting quarterback the following Monday, and Brendan Gaskins as the back-up. Jacob Bower transferred out in late January. Cooper then decided to transfer in July.

Among the 7 returning starters on offense and the 5 returning starters on defense are: Sete Aulai (center), Travis Bright and Ray Feinga (offensive guards), Dallas Reynolds (offensive tackle), Manase Tonga (fullback), Matt Allen and Michael Reed (wide receivers), Jan Jorgensen (defensive end), Bryan Kehl and David Nixon (linebackers), Ben Criddle (cornerback), and Quinn Gooch (free safety). Dustin Gabriel had a foot injury during Fall camp to end his 2007 season, and make him unable to start as KAT. Russell Tialavea, nose tackle, went out in Fall camp with a torn ACL and MCL.

Fall camp started August 4. In the preseason, several players suffered foot and leg injuries (Gabriel, Tafuna, Cooper), like Lisfranc fractures, that may be related to the Nike shoes the players were wearing.

== During the season ==
The Cougars were ranked #25 in Sporting News pre-season ranking. They started the season unranked in the Coaches Poll (with 47 votes) and unranked in the AP Poll (with 14 votes).

=== Injuries ===
Garret Reden suffered a season-ending injury. Starting free safety, Quinn Gooch ended his season when he tore his ACL in the second half of the TCU game.

=== Postseason awards and citations ===
Freshman Harvey Unga was named to the Rivals Freshman All-America Second Team. Unga, has 1,211 rushing yards and 629 receiving yards for the season, is the Cougars' all-time leading freshman running back and the first BYU freshman to pass the 1,000-yard mark in a single season. He has rushed for over 100 yards in seven games this season, the most for a freshman at BYU. He is five yards short of the MWC all-time leading freshman running back.

Senior wide receiver Matt Allen was named one of 11 finalists for the Wuerffel Trophy.

=== All-Mountain West Conference Football Teams ===
Harvey Unga was named as the MWC Freshman of the Year, BYU's third recipient of that award following Luke Staley in 1999 and Austin Collie in 2004.

First Team Offense: Max Hall, Dennis Pitta, Ray Feinga, Dallas Reynolds, Harvey Unga* and Austin Collie*.
First Team Defense: Jan Jorgensen and Bryan Kehl.
Second Team Offense: Austin Collie and Harvey Unga.
Second Team Defense: Kelly Poppinga.
Honorable Mention: Austin Collie (KR) and Quinn Gooch

*CFN only

== Game summaries ==
=== Arizona ===
Team	1	2	3	4	Total
Arizona Wildcats	0	0	0	7	7
• BYU Cougars	7	6	0	7	20

- Date: September 1
- Location: LaVell Edwards Stadium, Provo, UT
- Game start: 3:36 p.m. MST
- Elapsed time: 3:11
- Game attendance: 64,525
- Game weather: 92 °F (33 °C), clear, wind N 4 mph (6.4 km/h)
- Referee: Gerald Wright
- TV announcers (VS.): Joe Beninati, Glenn Parker, Tim Neverett

Scoring summary
1	6:02	BYU	Harvey Unga 27-yard pass from Max Hall (Mitch Payne kick)	BYU 7-0
2	0:38	BYU	Dennis Pitta 2-yard pass from Max Hall (kick failed)	BYU 13-0
4	3:24	BYU	Harvey Unga 11-yard run (Mitch Payne kick)	BYU 20-0
4	0:53	UA	Earl Mitchell 7-yard pass from Willie Tuitama (Jason Bondzio kick)	BYU 20-7

This was the 21st game between Arizona and BYU. BYU was favored to win in this defensive contest. BYU quarterback Max Hall took his first snap in Division I football after a 4-year hiatus of not playing a real game since high school, and the Wildcats began their first year using a version of BYU's spread offense. BYU's experienced defense held the Wildcats scoreless until the last minute of the game. Bronco took blame for calling a blitz that allowed an Arizona touchdown. The offensive line was solid allowing Hall to show his competence with 66% completion, 288 passing yards and some decent scrambles. Unga impressed with 196 all-purpose yards. But special teams revealed room for improvement. Starting BYU fullback Manase Tonga was suspended only for this game due to an arrest related to a traffic stop. BYU Backup inside linebacker Terrance Hooks was also suspended for this game. At half time, BYU retired the number 14 at halftime in honor of Gifford Nielsen and Ty Detmer. Hodgkiss will continue to use the number until the end of the season. Redshirt Freshman, Harvey Unga was named the MWC Offensive Player of the Week with 67 yards rushing, 127 yards receiving, and two touchdowns.

Arizona Leads Series 11-9-1

=== UCLA ===
Team	1	2	3	4	Total
BYU Cougars	0	3	14	0	17
• #13 UCLA Bruins	10	10	0	7	27

- Date: September 8
- Location: Rose Bowl Stadium, Los Angeles, CA
- Game start: 3:39 p.m. PST
- Elapsed time: 3:25
- Game attendance: 72,986
- Game weather: 78 °F (26 °C), light haze, wind SE 5 mph (8.0 km/h)
- Referee: Brian O'Cain
- TV announcers (VS.): Ted Robinson, Kelly Stouffer, Lewis Johnson

Scoring summary
1	3:39	UCLA	Kai Forbath 37-yard field goal	UCLA 3-0
1	1:58	UCLA	Trey Brown 56-yard interception return (Kai Forbath kick) (kick failed)	UCLA 10-0
2	11:01	UCLA	Kahlil Bell 4-yard run (Kai Forbath kick)	UCLA 17-0
2	3:28	UCLA	Kai Forbath 40-yard field goal	UCLA 20-0
2	0:05	BYU	Mitch Payne 25-yard field goal	UCLA 20-3
3	8:19	BYU	Austin Collie 5-yard pass from Max Hall (Mitch Payne kick)	UCLA 20-10
3	6:04	BYU	Austin Collie 16-yard pass from Max Hall (Mitch Payne kick)	UCLA 20-17
4	0:53	UCLA	Chris Markey 3-yard run (Kai Forbath kick)	UCLA 27-17

This was the 8th game between UCLA and BYU with UCLA favored to win by 8 points or so. This game was widely considered to be the Cougars' toughest regular season game. Emotions were high as Ben Olson, who originally committed to BYU, transferred to UCLA after his mission and was the starting quarterback for the Bruins. The Bruins jumped out to a commanding lead at the end of the first half scoring their first touchdown on a 56-yard interception. The Cougars drew within 3 points in the third quarter, and were poised to pull ahead reaching the "blue zone" with less than 6 minutes in the game. However a forced fumble, as Hall intended to pass, stopped the Cougars final, successful drive. Max Hall outplayed Olson; he impressed completing 30 of 52 passes for 391 yards compared to Olson's 126 yards. Despite the score, the Cougars outplayed the Bruins, even in the first half; the Cougars got 431 total yards to the Bruins' 236, but 11 penalties and 3 turnovers cost the Cougars the game. This game ended the Cougars 11-game winning streak and their best chance at a run for a BCS bowl game this year.

UCLA Leads Series 7-1

=== Tulsa ===
Team	1	2	3	4	Total
BYU Cougars	7	27	6	7	47
• Tulsa Golden Hurricane	14	17	14	10	55

- Date: September 15
- Location: Chapman Stadium, Tulsa, OK
- Game start: 8:06 p.m. CST
- Elapsed time: 3:57
- Game attendance: 24,445
- Game weather: 73 °F (23 °C), sunny
- Referee: Land Clark
- TV announcers (CSTV): Tom Hart, Trev Alberts

Scoring summary
1	10:05	BYU	Harvey Unga 1-yard run (Brian Smith kick)	BYU 7-0
1	4:28	TLS	Corey Heinz 43-yard pass from Paul Smith (Jarod Tracy kick)	TIED 7-7
1	0:30	TLS	Trae Johnson 30-yard pass from Paul Smith (Jarod Tracy kick)	TLS 14-7
2	13:46	BYU	Austin Collie 45-yard pass from Max Hall (Brian Smith kick)	TIED 14-14
2	13:36	TLS	Brennan Marion 75-yard pass from Paul Smith (Jarod Tracy kick)	TLS 21-14
2	11:30	BYU	Dennis Pitta 13-yard pass from Max Hall (Brian Smith kick)	TIED 21-21
2	10:27	TLS	Corey Heinz 18-yard pass from Paul Smith (Jarod Tracy kick)	TLS 28-21
2	7:51	BYU	Manase Tonga 2-yard run (Brian Smith kick)	TIED 28-28
2	5:17	TLS	Jarod Tracy 45-yard field goal	TLS 31-28
2	3:11	BYU	Max Allen 15-yard pass from Max Hall (kick failed)	BYU 34-31
3	14:00	TLS	Corey Heinz 18-yard pass from Paul Smith (Jarod Tracy kick)	TLS 38-34
3	10:45	TLS	Tarrio Adams 10-yard run (Jarod Tracy kick)	TLS 45-34
3	6:55	BYU	Manase Tonga 6-yard run (kick failed)	TLS 45-40
4	11:51	TLS	Corey Heinz 37-yard pass from Paul Smith (Jarod Tracy kick)	TLS 52-40
4	6:44	BYU	Michael Reed 36-yard pass from Max Hall (Mitch Payne kick)	TLS 52-47
4	4:21	TLS	Jarod Tracy 27-yard field goal	TLS 55-47

This was the 7th game between Tulsa and BYU. The Cougars defeated the Golden Hurricane 49-24 in Provo last season, but were handed a loss in this game. Coach Mendenhall took responsibility for the loss; he stated that he did not prepare the team for the superior offensive prowess Tulsa possessed. Tulsa's offense was led by its senior quarterback, Paul Smith, who drew BYU's secondary out of their zones and then threw over the top for large gains several times. BYU's defense adjusted well in the second half, nevertheless, the team was also plagued with 14 penalties for 138 yards, 4 turnovers including a pick six for 49 yards early in the third quarter, and some poor kicking (including 2 missed PATs and a 29-yard field goal attempt). Statistically BYU gained more yards than Tulsa in this shootout at 694 yards versus 595 yards of total offense. Collie impressed with 8 kick returns for 237 yards, and Hall passed for 537 yards, but not enough for the offense to seize the win.

BYU Leads Series 6-1

=== Air Force ===
Team	1	2	3	4	Total
Air Force Falcons	0	0	6	0	6
• BYU Cougars	7	10	7	7	31

- Date: September 22
- Location: LaVell Edwards Stadium, Provo, UT
- Game start: 1:06 p.m. MST
- Elapsed time: 2:52
- Game attendance: 64,502
- Game weather: 70 °F (21 °C), cloudy, wind NW 3 mph (4.8 km/h)
- Referee: Scott Novak
- TV announcers (mtn.): Bill Doleman, Blaine Fowler, Sammy Linebaugh

Scoring summary
1	11:02	BYU	Manase Tonga 1-yard run (Mitch Payne kick)	BYU 7-0
2	14:54	BYU	Matt Allen 9-yard pass from Max Hall (Mitch Payne kick)	BYU 14-0
2	1:14	BYU	Mitch Payne 42-yard field goal	BYU 17-0
3	10:54	BYU	Harvey Unga 29-yard pass from Max Hall (Mitch Payne kick)	BYU 24-0
3	3:31	AFA	Shuan Carney 8-yard run (run failed)	BYU 24-6
4	13:51	BYU	Manase Tonga 2-yard run (Mitch Paybe kick)	BYU 31-6

This was the 28th game between Air Force and BYU for BYU's Homecoming game. Air Force hired new head coach Troy Calhoun this year after Fisher DeBerry retired.

BYU Leads Series 22-6

=== New Mexico ===
Team	1	2	3	4	Total
• BYU Cougars	7	7	7	10	31
New Mexico Loboes	0	6	15	3	24

- Date: September 29
- Location: University Stadium, Albuquerque, NM
- Game start: 6:36 p.m. MST
- Elapsed time: 3:34
- Game attendance: 34,204
- Game weather: 76 °F (24 °C), 30% chance of rain, winds SSW 20 mph (32 km/h)
- Referee: Terry Leyden
- TV announcers (CSTV): Tom Hart, Trev Alberts

Scoring summary
1	13:06	BYU	Bryan Kehl 36-yard interception return (Mitch Payne kick)	BYU 7-0
2	11:50	BYU	Manase Tonga 8-yard run (Mitch Payne kick)	BYU 14-0
2	1:41	UNM	Rodney Ferguson 1-yard run (kick failed)	BYU 14-6
3	9:23	BYU	Austin Collie 59-yard pass from Max Hall (Mitch Payne kick)	BYU 21-6
3	2:23	UNM	Rodney Ferguson 5-yard run (John Sullivan kick)	BYU 21-13
3	0:27	UNM	Rodney Ferguson 71-yard pass from Donovan Porterie (Chris Mark pass from Donovan Porterie)	TIED 21-21
4	11:04	BYU	Dennis Pitta 14-yard pass from Max Hall (Mitch Payne kick)	BYU 28-21
4	7:34	UNM	John Sullivan 43-yard field goal	BYU 28-24
4	4:12	BYU	Mitch Payne 22-yard field goal	BYU 31-24

This win was the 57th game between New Mexico and BYU. BYU beat the Lobos 42-17 on Senior Day last year. This game featured the MWC's leading passer, UNM's Porterie, and was expected to test BYU's secondary particularly after the Cougar's shootout with Tulsa. The game was tied at the end of the third quarter with a 71-yard touchdown reception by the Lobo's running back, Ferguson, and a 2-point conversion after BYU jumped out to lead with a pick six by Kehl in the first 2 minutes of the game and took advantage of five turnovers and a blocked PAT by Criddle. Overall, the Cougars showed balance and performed well in all aspects of the game on both sides of the ball. Bryan Kehl was named the MWC Defensive Player of the Week with 10 tackles including a sack, a forced fumble, a fumble recovery, and an interception for a 36-yard touchdown.

BYU Leads Series 42-14-1

=== UNLV ===
Team	1	2	3	4	Total
• BYU Cougars	0	7	10	7	24
UNLV Rebels	3	3	0	8	14

- Date: October 13
- Location: Sam Boyd Stadium, Las Vegas, NV
- Game start: 6:36 p.m. PST
- Elapsed time: 2:58
- Game attendance: 38,026
- Game weather: 77 °F (25 °C), partly cloudy, winds W 1 mph (1.6 km/h)
- Referee: Rich Kollen
- TV announcers (mtn.): Bill Doleman, Blaine Fowler, Jenny Cavnar

Scoring summary
1	7:44	UNLV	Sergio Aguayo 37-yard field goal	UNLV 3-0
2	6:30	BYU	Manase Tonga 3-yard run (Mitch Payne kick)	BYU 7-3
2	2:45	UNLV	Sergio Aguayo 43-yard field goal	BYU 7-6
3	9:49	BYU	Vic So'oto 4-yard pass from Max Hall (Mitch Payne kick)	BYU 14-6
3	1:31	BYU	Mitch Payne 27-yard field goal	BYU 17-6
4	3:15	BYU	Harvey Unga 5-yard run (Mitch Payne kick)	BYU 24-6
4	1:11	UNLV	Rodelin Anthony 5-yard pass from Omar Clayton (Casey Flair pass from Omar Clayton)	BYU 24-14

This was the 14th game between UNLV and BYU. BYU won the last meeting, 52-7, in 2006 and was favored to win this game by 10 points. The game was at Sam Boyd Stadium, and will be Family Weekend for UNLV. It was estimated that 15,000 BYU fans attended the game.

BYU Leads Series 11-3

=== Eastern Washington ===
Team	1	2	3	4	Total
Eastern Washington Eagles	0	7	0	0	7
• BYU Cougars	14	7	14	7	42

- Date: October 20
- Location: LaVell Edwards Stadium, Provo, UT
- Game start: 3:35 p.m. MST
- Elapsed time: 3:02
- Game attendance: 64,522
- Game weather: 38 °F (3 °C), overcast w/ rain and snow, wind S 10 mph (16 km/h)
- Referee: Land Clark
- TV announcers (mtn.): Rich Cellini, Jon Berger, Sammy Linebaugh

Scoring summary
1	13:34	BYU	Corby Hodgkiss 39-yard interception return (Mitch Payne kick)	BYU 7-0
1	7:31	BYU	Harvey Unga 22-yard pass from Max Hall (Mitch Payne kick)	BYU 14-0
2	10:15	EWU	Aaron Boyce 28-yard pass from Matt Nichols (Felipe Macias kick)	BYU 14-7
2	1:35	BYU	Harvey Unga 13-yard run (Mitch Payne kick)	BYU 21-7
3	14:19	BYU	Manase Tonga 7-yard run (Mitch Payne kick)	BYU 28-7
3	3:14	BYU	Max Hall 1-yard run (Mitch Payne kick)	BYU 35-7
4	13:38	BYU	Fui Vakapuna 6-yard run (Mitch Paybe kick)	BYU 42-7

This was the first matchup between Eastern Washington and BYU. Corby Hodgkiss took a 39-yard touchdown interception on Eastern Washington's first drive. Bryan Kehl and Quinn Gooch also came away with an interception each. Due to weather and an early defensive touchdown, BYU went away from the pass fairly early. The final quarter was one of the shortest in recent memory as the refs were very liberal with the clock. This was mostly due to the fact the score was 42-7 and there was a blizzard. The last 10 minutes in the game it was hard to see the field yet the cougar faithful cheered loudly until the end.

BYU Leads Series 1-0

=== Colorado State ===
Team	1	2	3	4	Total
Colorado State Rams	0	3	0	13	16
• BYU Cougars	7	14	7	7	35

- Date: November 3
- Location: LaVell Edwards Stadium, Provo, UT
- Game start: 12:06 p.m. MST
- Elapsed time: 3:01
- Game attendance: 64,441
- Game weather: 49 °F (9 °C), fair
- Referee: Rich Kollen
- TV announcers (mtn.): James Bates, Todd Christensen, Sammy Linebaugh

Scoring summary
1	8:57	BYU	Michael Reed 9-yard pass from Max Hall (Mitch Payne kick)	BYU 7-0
2	14:02	CSU	Jason Smith 25-yard field goal	BYU 7-3
2	10:40	BYU	Manase Tonga 3-yard run (Mitch Payne kick)	BYU 14-3
2	8:18	BYU	Austin Collie 45-yard pass from Max Hall (Mitch Payne kick)	BYU 21-3
3	12:43	BYU	Harvey Unga 3-yard run (Mitch Payne kick)	BYU 28-3
4	8:20	CSU	Michael Myers 3-yard run (Jason Smith kick)	BYU 28-6
4	5:44	BYU	Joe Semanoff 5-yard pass from Max Hall (Mitch Payne kick)	BYU 35-6
4	4:07	BYU	Jesse Nading 31-yard interception return (Jason Smith kick)	BYU 35-13

This was the 65th game between Colorado State and BYU. BYU beat the Rams 24-3 on the road in 2006. BYU extended its conference record to 4-0 (including a conference win-streak of 12-0), its home-win-streak to 10-0, and became bowl eligible. The Rams reached the redzone 3 times in the first half, but only came away with one field goal. Hall completed 22 of 30 passes for 355 yards and three touchdowns, and his first game with no interceptions. Unga rushed 11 times for 51 yards making him BYU's all-time leading freshman running back with a season total of 735 yards. Unga also grabbed three receptions for 110 yards including a 53-yard catch and scramble. Collie caught 8 balls for 111 yards including a 45-yard touchdown reception. Pitta added a 45-yard reception in the final quarter. Gooch took his second interception of the season, and Jorgensen added 2.5 sacks to lead the team with 6.5 sacks. Gaskins came in for Hall in the last minutes of the game to throw his first pass in a Division I FBS game which resulted in an interception and a 31-yard return for a CSU touchdown.

BYU Leads Series 35-27-3

=== TCU ===
Team	1	2	3	4	Total
TCU Horned Frogs	3	6	6	7	22
• BYU Cougars	7	10	7	3	27

- Date: November 8
- Location: LaVell Edwards Stadium, Provo, UT
- Game start: 7:06 p.m. MST
- Elapsed time: 3:23
- Game attendance: 64,241
- Game weather: 54 °F (12 °C), fair, winds calm
- Referee: Dan Romeo
- TV announcers (VS.): Joe Beninati, Glenn Parker, Tim Neverett

Scoring summary
1	11:23	BYU	Harvey Unga 15-yard run (Mitch Payne kick)	BYU 7-0
1	4:44	TCU	Chris Manfredini 38-yard field goal	BYU 7-3
2	11:41	BYU	Joe Semanoff 1-yard pass from Max Hall (Mitch Payne kick)	BYU 14-3
2	6:53	TCU	Chris Manfredini 37-yard field goal	BYU 14-6
2	1:47	BYU	Mitch Payne 33-yard field goal	BYU 17-6
2	0:01	TCU	Chris Manfredini 33-yard field goal	BYU 17-9
3	13:58	BYU	Harvey Unga 3-yard run (Mitch Payne kick)	BYU 24-9
3	10:10	TCU	Marcus Brock 1-yard run (kick failed)	BYU 24-15
4	13:06	BYU	Mitch Payne 29-yard field goal	BYU 27-15
4	3:49	TCU	Bart Johnson 75-yard pass from Andy Dalton (Chris Manfredini kick)	BYU 27-22

This was the 9th game between TCU and BYU. BYU went on the road to win 31-17 in this meeting last year, sparking their 8-0 run through the MWC. Kelly Poppinga was named the MWC Defensive Player of the Week with a career-high 17 tackles including a tackle for a loss and an interception in this game.

BYU Leads Series 7-2

=== Wyoming ===
Team	1	2	3	4	Total
• BYU Cougars	7	14	7	7	35
Wyoming Cowboys	0	3	7	0	10

- Date: November 17
- Location: War Memorial Stadium, Laramie, WY
- Game start: 12:06 p.m. MST
- Elapsed time: 3:03
- Game attendance: 19,827
- Game weather: 49 °F (9 °C), cloudy
- Referee: Karl Richins
- TV announcers (mtn.): James Bates, Todd Christensen, Toby Christensen

Scoring summary
1	10:37	BYU	Harvey Unga 2-yard run (Mitch Payne kick)	BYU 7-0
2	9:56	BYU	Matt Allen 3-yard pass from Max Hall (Mitch Payne kick)	BYU 14-0
2	4:42	BYU	Dennis Pitta 23-yard pass from Max Hall (Mitch Payne kick)	BYU 21-0
2	1:40	WY	Billy Vinnedge 20-yard field goal	BYU 21-3
3	10:46	BYU	Michael Reed 10-yard pass from Max Hall (Mitch Payne kick)	BYU 28-3
3	5:35	WY	Wynel Seldon 2-yard run (Billy Vinnedge kick)	BYU 28-10
4	11:42	BYU	Harvey Unga 2-yard run (Mitch Payne kick)	BYU 35-10

This was the 72nd game between Wyoming and BYU. BYU dominated the Cowboys from the opening kickoff last season, 55-7. This year BYU controlled the game from the beginning taking a 21-3 lead at half time. Sophomore Max Hall was named MWC Offensive Player of the Week with 331 passing yards, over 70% completion and three touchdowns. Hall broke the MWC's all-time sophomore passing leader by reaching 3,121 passing yards. In BYU quarterback-factory history, Hall ranks third behind Ty Detmer and Robbie Bosco for passing yards in their first 10 games as a starter. Hall went out in the third quarter after suffering a shoulder separation.

BYU Leads Series 39-30-3

=== Utah ===
Team	1	2	3	4	Total
Utah Utes	0	0	3	7	10
• #23 BYU Cougars	0	3	3	11	17

- Date: November 24
- Location: LaVell Edwards Stadium, Provo, UT
- Game start: 12:09 p.m. MST
- Elapsed time: 3:09
- Game attendance: 64,749
- Game weather: 40 °F (4 °C), clear
- Referee: Scott Novak
- TV announcers (mtn., CSTV, VS.): James Bates, Todd Christensen, Blaine Fowler, Sammy Linebaugh

Scoring summary
2	4:47	BYU	Mitch Payne 22-yard field goal	BYU 3-0
3	9:45	UTAH	Louie Sakoda 35-yard field goal	TIED 3-3
3	2:52	BYU	Mitch Payne 23-yard field goal	BYU 6-3
4	13:48	BYU	Mitch Payne 35-yard field goal	BYU 9-3
4	1:34	UTAH	Darrell Mack 1-yard run (Louie Sakoda kick)	UTAH 10-9
4	0:38	BYU	Harvey Unga 11-yard run (Max Hall to Austin Collie pass)	BYU 17-10

This rivalry game, unofficially dubbed "The Holy War," is typically the most anticipated conference game for each of these two teams. In 2006, the rivalry was ranked in the Wall Street Journal as the 4th best college football rivalry game in the country. (See also Utah–BYU rivalry.) This was the 83rd game between Utah and BYU with the series going 49-30-4 for Utah since 1922. Utah dominated the series 34-2-4 through 1964. Since that time BYU has led the series 28-15. Utah's 4-game-winning-streak against BYU ended last year with a game-winning, last-second play. In 2007, BYU achieved its first back-to-back wins over Utah since 2000–2001.

The game was largely a defensive struggle until the last few minutes of the fourth quarter. The Utes took the lead 10-9 when Darrell Mack scored the first touchdown of the game with just 1:34 left. On the ensuing possession, however, BYU converted on fourth and eighteen from their own 12 with a 49-yard pass from Max Hall to Austin Collie. Harvey Unga made the game-winning touchdown run with 38 seconds remaining, and Austin Collie caught a pass in the back of the end zone for a two-point conversion, putting the Cougars up 17-10. Unga became BYU's first freshman running back to gain 1,000 rushing yards in a season. This was also Collie's 6th game for over 97 yards receiving. BYU racked up 424 offensive yards to Utah's 244. Unga was named the MWC Offensive Player of the Week, and freshman kicker, Mitch Payne, was named MWC Special Teams Player of the Week making 3 of 4 field goals.

Utah Leads Series 49-30-4

=== San Diego State ===
Team	1	2	3	4	Total
• #21 BYU Cougars	13	7	14	14	48
San Diego State Aztecs	7	6	7	7	27

- Date: December 1
- Location: Qualcomm Stadium, San Diego, CA
- Game start: 3:36 p.m. PST
- Elapsed time: 3:24
- Game attendance: 28,473
- Game weather: 56 °F (13 °C), partly cloudy, winds w 9 mph (14 km/h)
- Referee: Dan Romeo
- TV announcers (mtn.): Rich Cellini, Jon Berger, Jenny Cavnar

Scoring summary
1	9:55	BYU	Harvey Unga 8-yard pass from Max Hall (Mitch Payne kick)	BYU 7-0
1	4:55	SDSU	Kevin O'Connell 7-yard run (Garrett Palmer kick)	TIED 7-7
1	0:02	BYU	Harvey Unga 1-yard run (kick failed)	BYU 13-7
2	5:39	SDSU	Garrett Palmer 41-yard field goal	BYU 13-10
2	1:11	BYU	Austin Collie 17-yard pass from Max Hall (Mitch Payne kick)	BYU 20-10
2	0:00	SDSU	Garrett Palmer 41-yard field goal	BYU 20-13
3	12:32	BYU	Harvey Unga 7-yard run (Mitch Payne kick)	BYU 27-13
3	6:49	SDSU	Lynel Hamilton 3-yard pass from Kevin O'Connell (Garrett Palmer kick)	BYU 27-20
3	0:52	BYU	Harvey Unga 3-yard run (Mitch Payne kick)	BYU 34-20
4	12:17	BYU	Fui Vakapuna 2-yard run (Mitch Payne kick)	BYU 41-20
4	9:372	SDSU	Kevin O'Connell 2-yard run (Garrett Palmer kick)	BYU 41-27
4	4:20	BYU	Dennis Pitta 13-yard pass from Max Hall (Mitch Payne kick)	BYU 48-27

This game was originally scheduled to be played on October 27, but was rescheduled due to wildfires in southern California. This was the 32nd game between San Diego State and BYU. The Aztecs fell 47-17 in Provo last October. This game marked the Cougars' MWC record 16th straight conference victory. Freshman running-back Harvey Unga scored a career-high four touchdowns with 161 rushing yards and 29 receiving yards. Sophomore quarterback Max Hall completed 19 of 26 throws for 227 yards and three touchdowns. BYU was slow to put the game away, but had a 14-point lead by the end of the third quarter. Harvey Unga and Jan Jorgensen were named MWC Offensive and Defensive Players of the Week.

BYU leads the series 24-7-1

=== Las Vegas Bowl ===
Team	1	2	3	4	Total
UCLA Bruins	3	10	0	3	16
• #17 BYU Cougars	3	14	0	0	17

- Date: December 22
- Location: Sam Boyd Stadium, Las Vegas, NV
- Game start: 5:12 p.m. PST
- Elapsed time: 3:23
- Game attendance: 40,712
- Game weather: 42 °F (6 °C), clear and cold, winds calm
- Referee: Ed Kierce
- TV announcers (ESPN/Sports USA): Brad Nessler, Bob Griese, Paul Maguire (ESPN)
  Tom Dillon, John Robinson (Sports USA)

Scoring summary
1	8:12	UCLA	Kai Forbath 22-yard field goal	UCLA 3-0
1	8:06	BYU	Mitch Payne 29-yard field goal	TIED 3-3
2	10:32	BYU	Austin Collie 14-yard pass from Max Hall (Mitch Payne kick)	BYU 10-3
2	4:44	UCLA	Kai Forbath 52-yard field goal	BYU 10-6
2	1:03	BYU	Michael Reed 13-yard pass from Max Hall (Mitch Payne kick)	BYU 17-6
2	0:00	UCLA	Brandon Breazell 4-yard pass from McLeod Bethel-Thompson (Kai Forbath kick)	BYU 17-13
4	6:24	UCLA	Kai Forbath 50-yard field goal	BYU 17-16

Eathyn Manumaleuna blocked a last second field goal by UCLA and BYU hung on to beat the Bruins 17-16. BYU quarterback Max Hall went 21-35 for 231 yards and two touchdowns. Manase Tonga led the rushing with 3 carries for 21 yards. The MVP of the game, Austin Collie had 6 catches for 107 yards and 1 touchdown. For UCLA, quarterback McLeod Bethel-Thompson went 11-27 for 154 yards and 1 touchdown and interception. The rushing game was led by Chris Markey who ran 27 times for 117 yards. This was the first time the Cougars gave up 100 yards rushing to a single player. Bethel-Thompson's favorite target was Brandon Breazell who caught 4 passes for 44 yards and 1 touchdown. The Bruins struck first with a 22-yard Kai Forbath field goal. A 29-yard field goal by BYU kicker Mitch Payne made it 3-3 after the 1st quarter. In the 2nd, Hall hooked up with Austin Collie for 14 yards and a touchdown to make it 10-3. Forbath then hit a 52-yard field goal to cut the lead to 10-6. With 1:03 left in the 1st half, Hall found Michael Reed for 13 yards and a touchdown. As time expired, Bethel-Thompson hit Breazell to make it 17-13 in favor of BYU at the end of the 2nd quarter. There was no scoring in the 3rd. In the 4th, Forbath made it 17-16 with a 50-yard field goal. BYU punted to UCLA with around 2 minutes left to set up a final drive for the Bruins. Bethel-Thompson, a fourth-string walk-on quarterback, along with Chris Markey drove to the BYU 49. On 3rd and 8 Bethel-Thompson hit Logan Paulsen to get to the BYU 13. That set up a chip-shot 28-yard field goal for Forbath, who already hit 2 50+ yarders. The kick was too low and Manumaleuna blocked it and sealed the game for the Cougars.

== Rankings ==
Ranking movements Legend: ██ Increase in ranking ██ Decrease in ranking — = Not ranked RV = Received votes
	Week															
Poll	Pre	1	2	3	4	5	6	7	8	9	10	11	12	13	14	Final
AP	RV	RV	—	—	—	—	—	RV	RV	RV	RV	RV	23	21	19	14
Coaches Poll	RV	RV	RV	—	—	—	—	RV	RV	RV	RV	RV	23	19	19	14
Harris	Not released				RV	—	—	—	RV	RV	RV	RV	23	20	18	Not released
BCS	Not released							—	—	—	—	—	25	19	17	Not released

== Statistical leaders ==
Passing
Player	COMP	ATT	Pct.	YDS	TD	INT	QB rating
Max Hall	298	496	60.1	3,848	26	12	137.7

Rushing
Player	ATT	YDS	YPC	TD
Harvey Unga	244	1,227	5.0	13
Manase Tonga	88	305	3.5	8
Fui Vakapuna	73	252	3.5	2

Receiving
Player	REC	YDS	YPC	TD
Austin Collie	56	946	16.9	7
Dennis Pitta	59	813	13.8	5
Harvey Unga	44	655	14.9	4
Michael Reed	41	449	11.0	4
Matt Allen	31	358	11.5	3
Manase Tonga	27	248	9.2	0

Tackles & Broken plays
Player	Solo	Asst	Total	TFL	Sacks	Int
Kelly Poppinga	46	67	113	7.5	-	1
Bryan Kehl	52	39	91	11.5	4	3
Jan Jorgensen	40	37	77	20	14	
David Nixon	38	28	66	10	4	
Corby Hodgkiss	30	27	57	3.5	-	3
Ben Criddle	37	19	56	1	-	2
Mark Staffieri	26	28	54	5	1	
Quinn Gooch	22	30	52	.5	-	3

== Coaching staff ==
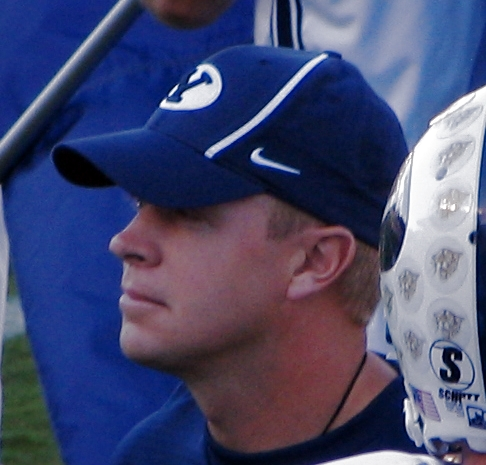
Bronco Mendenhall, Head Coach

Name	Position	Year at BYU	Alma mater (Year)
Bronco Mendenhall	Head coach/ Defensive coordinator	5th 2003–present	Oregon State (1987)
Lance Reynolds	Assistant head coach Running backs	25th 1983–present	BYU (1980)
Robert Anae	Offensive coordinator/ Inside receivers	3rd 2005–present	BYU (1986)
Brandon Doman	Quarterbacks	3rd 2005–present	BYU (2002)
Patrick Higgins	Outside receivers/ Special teams	3rd 2005–present	William Penn University (1986)
Barry Lamb	Outside linebackers/ Safeties	15th 1994–present	Oregon (1978)
Paul Tidwell	Inside linebackers	7th 2001–present	Southern Utah University (1979)
Mark Weber	Offensive line	1st 2007	Cal Lutheran (1980)
Jaime Hill	Defensive backs	2nd 2006–present	San Francisco State University (1986)
Steve Kaufusi	Defensive line	6th 2002–present	BYU (1994)
Jay Omer	Strength and conditioning	7th 2001–present	Southern Utah University (1972)

== Personnel ==
=== Roster ===
Wide receivers: 2 Bryce Mahuika^{†} – Junior; 3 Michael Reed^{††} – Junior; 7 Ryan Kessman – Freshman; 9 Austin Collie^{†} – Sophomore; 10 Matt Allen^{††} – Senior; 16 Parker Mangum – Sophomore; 20 Reed White – Junior; 22 Tyler Kozlowski – (redshirt) Freshman; 80 Jordan Smith – Freshman; 82 Ryan Neeley – Junior; 83 Saia Hafoka – Junior; 84 Matt Marshall – Freshman; 85 Landon Jaussi – Sophomore; 86 Daniel Tervort – Sophomore; 87 Griffin Miller – Freshman; 89 Cortny Barton – Junior; Fullbacks: 11 Manase Tonga^{††} – Junior; 27 Joe Semanoff – Senior; 30 Inoke Hafoka – Freshman; Offensive linemen: 51 Mark Freeman – Freshman; 53 Tom Sorensen – Sophomore; 64 R.J. Willing ^{†} – (redshirt) Sophomore; 65 Dallas Reynolds – Junior; 66 Garrett Reden – (redshirt) Freshman; 67 Sete Aulai^{††} – Senior; 68 David Oswald^{†} – Junior; 69 John Barrett – Sophomore; 70 Matt Reynolds – Freshman; 72 Nick Alleto – (redshirt) Freshman; 73 Jason Speredon – (redshirt) Freshman; 74 Travis Bright^{††} – Junior; 75 Walter Kahaialii - (redshirt) Freshman; 76 Ray Feinga^{††} – Junior; 79 Manaaki Vaitai – Freshman; Punters/Kickers: 24 Bryan Smith – Freshman; 26 C.J. Santiago^{†} – Junior; 38 Mitch Payne^{†} – (redshirt) Freshman	Tight ends: 32 Dennis Pitta – Sophomore; 37 Vic So'oto – (redshirt) Sophomore; 84 Jeff Allen – Sophomore; 88 Andrew George^{†} – (redshirt) Sophomore; 95 Kaneakua Friel – Freshman; 96 Matt Shirley – Freshman; Quarterbacks: 4 Kurt McEuen – (redshirt) Sophomore; 6 Brenden Gaskins – Sophomore; 7 James Lark – (redshirt) Freshman; 11 Jason Munns* – Freshman; 12 Sam Doman – (redshirt) Freshman; 15 Max Hall^{†} – (redshirt) Sophomore; Running backs: 1 Fui Vakapuna^{†} – Junior; 13 J.J. DiLuigi* – Freshman; 23 Ryan Folsom – Freshman; 29 Ryan Love – Freshman; 31 Isaac Taylor – Junior; 33 Wayne Latu – (redshirt) Sophomore; 45 Harvey Unga – (redshirt) Freshman; Defensive line: 52 Russell Tialavea* – (redshirt) Sophomore; 54 Kyle Luekenga* – Junior; 55 Eathyn Manumaleuna – Freshman; 56 Chris Muehlmann^{†} – Junior; 57 Matt Putnam – (redshirt) Freshman; 59 John Pace – Freshman; 63 David Angilau – Freshman; 71 Rick Wolfley^{†} – (redshirt) Freshman; 77 Ian Dulan^{†} – Sophomore; 84 Jan Jorgensen^{††} – (redshirt) Sophomore; 90 Mosese Foketi – Junior; 91 Judd Anderton – Senior; 92 Brett Denney – (redshirt) Sophomore; 93 Sean Sullivan – Senior; 94 Brock Richardson – Junior; 97 Spencer Wolfley – Freshman; 98 Steven Fendry – Freshman; (†)† (Returning) starter at position * Injured	Linebackers: 31 Chris Bolden – Senior; 35 Matt Bauman – Sophomore; 36 Markell Staffieri^{†} – Senior; 39 Grant Nelson – (redshirt) Freshman; 41 Bryan Kehl^{††} – Senior; 42 Shawn Doman – Sophomore; 43 David Nixon^{††} – Junior; 44 Dan Van Sweden – (redshirt) Sophomore; 46 Kelly Poppinga^{†} – Senior; 47 Terrance Hooks – (redshirt) Sophomore; 48 Austen Jorgensen – Freshman; 49 Jadon Wagner* – Freshman; 50 Tom Steele – Freshman; 51 Franco Improta – Sophomore; 52 Tyler Beck – Freshman; 58 Jeff Bell – Sophomore; Levi Mack* – Junior; 76 Graeme Girdler††- Sophomore; Cornerbacks: 4 Brandon Howard – (redshirt) Sophomore; 9 Brannon Brooks – Freshman; 17 G Pittman – Freshman; 19 Andre Saulsberry – Senior; 20 Gary Nagy – Freshman; 21 Ben Criddle^{††} – Senior; 34 Kayle Buchanan^{†} – Senior; Safeties: 14 Corby Hodgkiss^{†} – Senior; 16 Kellen Fowler – Junior; 18 Aaron Attig – (redshirt) Sophomore; 23 David Tafuna* – Senior; 25 Quinn Gooch*^{††} – Senior; 26 Jordan Pendelton – Freshman; 28 Dustin Gabriel* – Senior; 29 Scott Johnson – Junior; Defensive backs: 5 Brandon Bradley* – (redshirt) Freshman; 10 Blake Morgan – Freshman; 13 Steven Thomas – Freshman; 27 Evan Kleinhenz – Sophomore

=== Depth chart ===
Defense

FS
Kellen Fowler
Ben Criddle
⋅

WLB	BLB	MLB	SLB
David Nixon	Markell Staffieri	Kelly Poppinga	⋅
Chris Bolden	Shawn Doman	Matt Bauman	⋅
⋅	⋅	Terrance Hooks	⋅

KAT
Corby Hodgkiss
Aaron Attig
⋅

CB
Ben Criddle
Andre Saulsberry
⋅

DE	NT	DE
Ian Dulan	Eathyn Manumaleuna	Jan Jorgenson
Brett Denney	Rick Wolfley	Judd Anderton
⋅	Mosese Foketi	⋅

CB
Kayle Buchanan
Brandon Howard
⋅

Offense

SE/XR
Michael Reed
Matt Allen
⋅

SB/HR
Bryce Mahuika
Daniel Tervort
Reed White

LT	LG	C	RG	RT
Dallas Reynolds	Ray Feinga	Sete Aulai	Travis Bright	David Oswald
R.J. Willing	Walter Kahaialii	Tom Sorensen	Jason Speredon	R.J. Willing
⋅	⋅	⋅	⋅	⋅

TE/YR
Dennis Pitta
Andrew George
Vic So’oto

FL/ZR
Matt Allen
Austin Collie
⋅

QB
Max Hall
Brenden Gaskins
⋅

Key reserves
FB Manase Tonga
FB Joe Semanoff
DS John Pace
H Bryce Mahuika

RB
Harvey Unga
Fui Vakapuna
⋅

Special teams
PK Mitch Payne
P C.J. Santiago
P Brian Smith
KR Bryce Mahuika
PR Austin Collie
LS Chris Muehlmann
H Matt Allen
