= BYU–Utah rivalry =

American college sports rivalry

- BYU Cougars Utah Utes
- Sport: Football, basketball, others

Locations of BYU and Utah

The Brigham Young University (BYU) Cougars and the University of Utah (Utah) Utes have a longstanding intercollegiate rivalry. The annual college football game is frequently referred to as the Holy War. In the 1890s, when BYU was still known as Brigham Young Academy (BYA), the two schools started competing athletically. The schools have met continually since 1909 in men's basketball, and met once a year in football from 1922 to 2013, with the exception of 1943–45 when BYU did not field a team due to World War II. Both schools formerly competed in the Mountain West Conference, but both teams left the MWC in 2011—Utah joined the Pac-12 Conference and BYU became a football independent while joining the West Coast Conference for other sports. Both teams currently compete in the Big 12 Conference, with BYU joining in 2023 and Utah being added to the conference in 2024.

There are several conditions which foster the rivalry: proximity of the two schools, successes of the academics and athletic teams, and religion. BYU is owned and operated by the Church of Jesus Christ of Latter-day Saints (LDS Church), while Utah is a secular institution and the flagship university of the state's System of Higher Education.

== History ==
In 1895, BYA and the University of Utah met for the first sporting event between the two schools: a baseball game. The scoreless match ended with a bench-clearing brawl, and a rivalry was born.

=== The early years ===
Unsurprisingly, the history of the BYU–Utah rivalry is also in dispute. Utah claims that the football rivalry began in the late 19th century, when Utah played BYA six times between 1896 and 1899. BYU does not count these games in their official records, since it was not then known as BYU, but BYA. Furthermore, BYU asserts that the first of those football games, a 12–4 Utah victory in April 1896, was in actuality a practice-scrimmage to prepare for the following fall season. But whether or not the game meant anything to the schools at the time, it certainly meant a great deal to the fans. At the end of the match, a fight broke out between fans of the two schools.

Through most of its history, this rivalry was classified as mainly a basketball rivalry. Though the schools have regularly played each other in football since at least 1922, the football aspect (known as the “Holy War”) was very one-sided. Utah dominated from the start and even with the resurgence of BYU football in the 1970s, Utah still has a large overall lead in the series. Not counting the disputed games involving BYA, Utah won the first six meetings by a combined score of 186–13. And by 1941, Utah led the series-record 17–0, with 3 ties. BYU finally earned its first victory of the rivalry in 1942, but wouldn't win another until 1958. By 1964, Utah had extended its record against BYU to 34–2, with 4 ties.

On the other hand, the basketball aspect of the rivalry was very competitive from its beginning in 1909. BYU won the first eight meetings, and by an average margin of about 12 points (including a 32–9 victory in the first game). After that though, neither team would win more than 4 straight until 1938; an impressive statistic considering that the teams would often play 4–5 times per season back then. The series remained close, and from 1939 to 1971, Utah won 37 of the meetings and BYU won 36.

During the early years of the rivalry, only Utah enjoyed basketball success on the national level. Utah won a National Championship in 1944, reached the Final Four in 1961 and 1966, and won the NIT Tournament in 1947. BYU won the NIT twice: in 1951, and again in 1966, when the NIT was still considered at least equal to, if not better than, the NCAA basketball tournament.

=== The rise of BYU football ===
During the 1970s and 80s, the basketball side of the rivalry remained close, with Utah winning 21 games and BYU winning 19. Meanwhile, the football side also began to intensify. In 1972, BYU hired a new head football coach, LaVell Edwards. In Edwards’ first season at the helm, BYU defeated Utah for the first time in five years. In 1974, BYU was invited to their first ever bowl game, after winning the conference championship for the second time ever. BYU also began to annually dominate Utah, who was experiencing a series of losing seasons and coaching changes. By 1976, Edwards had compiled a 5–0 record against the Utes.

In 1977, Utah hired a new coach of their own, Wayne Howard. That year, BYU soundly beat Utah 38–8 in Provo. With less than two minutes left, BYU's star QB, Marc Wilson, was sent back into the game to set an NCAA passing record and rack up an astounding 571 passing yards. In his post-game remarks to the press, Howard accused Edwards of running up the score, and was quoted as saying:

"This today will be inspiring. The hatred between BYU and Utah is nothing compared to what it will be. It will be a crusade to beat BYU from now on. This is a prediction: In the next two years Utah will drill BYU someday, but we won’t run up the score even if we could set an NCAA record against them."

Howard was able to lead Utah to victory over the Cougars the next year, but it would be his only time, and Utah's only victory over BYU in a 16-year period. Howard continued to have an intensity toward the rivalry, but retired from coaching after the 1981 season.

BYU went on to make a major impact on the national level. From 1979 to 1992, BYU went 13–1 against the Utes, won 11 conference championships, and a national championship in 1984. Utah's lone football victory over the Cougars during this period came in 1988.

As the football rivalry intensified, the emotion carried over into other sports. For instance, during a baseball game in the mid-1980s, BYU players taunted the Ute pitcher. The pitcher reacted by throwing a fastball into the Cougar dugout, igniting a bench-clearing brawl.

As the 1990s began, BYU's football program's success began to lessen, although from 1989 to 1996, BYU won at least a share of the WAC championship every year but one (1994, in which Utah ended the season in the top 10).

In 1996, Edwards assembled one of his best teams: winning 14 games, finishing the season #5 in both major polls, and with a thrilling victory over Kansas State in the Cotton Bowl Classic. That season, the Cougars snapped their 3-game losing streak to Utah, who had started to field a competitive team under the leadership of Coach Ron McBride. Under McBride, (hired in 1990), Utah found more success in football. In 1994, they compiled a 10–2 record, beat BYU, beat Arizona in the Freedom Bowl, and finished the season ranked No. 8 in the Coaches Poll.

=== The resurgence of Utah basketball ===
In the meantime, the basketball rivalry remained just as competitive as ever. In 1989, BYU and Utah each hired new head basketball coaches, Roger Reid and Rick Majerus respectively. These two coaches brought their colorful, and often controversial, personalities to an already-lively rivalry.

These coaches also had considerable success during their tenures. During Reid's seven-year term as coach, BYU won two WAC titles, played in five NCAA Tournaments, and one NIT.

In the fifteen head-to-head meetings involving these two coaches, Reid's teams won eight games, and Majerus’ teams won seven. However, Majerus would go on to have a much better career overall. In Majerus’ 12 full seasons as Utah coach, the Utes made 11 post-season appearances, including four Sweet Sixteens, and a Final Four in 1998. That year, the Utes lost to Kentucky in the championship game after holding a double-digit halftime lead.

Utah's resurgence to national basketball prominence, and BYU's struggles in the late 1990s, are illustrated by the fact that from 1995 to 2000, the Utes beat the Cougars 12 straight times. Additionally, BYU never won a game at Utah between 1994 and 2006. This resurgence was short-lived, however. Since 2006, BYU owns a 10–4 record against Utah in men's basketball.

=== The present ===
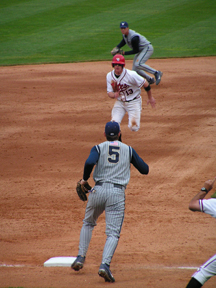
Baseball game between BYU and Utah, played March 20, 2007, at Smith's Ballpark in Salt Lake City. Utah won this game 8–4.

In the 2000s, BYU and Utah have each found themselves in the spotlight again. Especially in football, where several meetings have had important MWC, if not national, implications. In 2001, BYU came within a single game of making the case to become the first BCS non-AQ conference team to deserve a BCS bowl bid. Their near-perfect season included a thrilling 24–21 come-from-behind victory over the Utes on national television. Three years later, BYU and Utah met with a BCS invite again on the line, but this time it was Utah who was looking to cap off a perfect season. Under second-year head coach Urban Meyer, and future first overall draft selection Alex Smith at QB, the Utes beat the Cougars 52–21, and clinched a bid to the Fiesta Bowl. ESPN sent their College GameDay crew out to Salt Lake to highlight the event.

In November 2005, The Wall Street Journal ranked the BYU-Utah football rivalry as the fourth-best in the country.

On the basketball front, both schools regularly compete for the conference championship and post-season berths. Furthermore, the rivalry has featured such players as NBA lottery pick Rafael Araújo and the 10th pick in the 2011 NBA Draft, Jimmer Fredette for BYU, and NBA #1 Pick Andrew Bogut for Utah. To commemorate the rivalry, Utah's former coach, Ray Giacoletti was known to wear a red sports jacket (the "Giac-et") during each meeting.

And while the on-court intensity remains with the rivalry, off-court controversy is seemingly ever-present as well. In April 2004, eight Utah baseball players hiked onto the hillside above BYU's campus where lies a large concrete "Y." The players then painted the landmark red, and proceeded to take pictures of themselves in front of their handiwork. Ten days later, an employee of a discount store in Salt Lake notified the police that a customer had recently developed pictures of himself and friends in front of the painted "Y." The customer happened to be Ute pitcher Ryan Breska, and the store employee happened to be a BYU fan. When Breska returned to pick up his photos, police were waiting to arrest him. Breska and the rest of "The Utah 8" (as they became known) were charged with second-degree felony mischief, a charge that carries a maximum sentence of 15 years in prison. After much media publicity and public debate, authorities in Provo agreed to reduce the charges to class B misdemeanors and a fine of $6,267.20.

The matches have proved to be so intensive and compelling that in 2008 Deseret First Credit Union decided to sponsor the matches between the two schools, with the winning school being award a trophy at the end of each year. The event awards points for each head-to-head winner of the two schools across 12 sports: football, men's and women's basketball, men's and women's swimming, women's gymnastics, men's and women's tennis, baseball, softball, women's soccer, and women's volleyball. These 12 sports encompass the Deseret First Duel. The schools face off in regular season matches. The winner of each match is awarded 3 points as part of the Deseret First Duel scoring system, with the exception of football and men's basketball, where the winner gets 10 points. (The point system was altered prior to 2017, giving basketball winners just 3 points and football winners just 5 points.) Since the conception of the duel in 2008, Utah now leads the series, with seven titles to five for BYU. BYU won in 2008, and Utah won in 2009. Then the schools each won three years in a row, with BYU winning the title in 2010–2012, and Utah winning in 2013–2015. In 2016 and 2017, the two schools traded victories once again. Utah won again in 2018 and 2019, and has now won 6 of the last 7 Deseret Duel titles.

In 2021, BYU announced that they would join the Big 12 Conference starting in 2023. Utah followed suit in 2023, joining the conference in 2024. This makes the rivalry an in-conference one, the first time this has happened since 2011. The Holy War football rivalry was thus designated as a "protected" game, meaning that it will be played every year until at least 2027, one of four such matchups in the Big 12.

== 2016 basketball cancellation controversy ==
In January 2016, Utah Coach Larry Krystkowiak ignited a controversy in the state of Utah for deciding to cancel a scheduled game between the two teams in the 2016–17 season.

Krystkowiak said the main reason for the game's cancellation was increasingly chippy play among players of both teams in what had become an increasingly heated rivalry in recent years. This concern escalated following a punch thrown by BYU guard Nick Emery at Utah guard Brandon Taylor during the December 2, 2015, contest. In the second half, after some back-and-forth physicality between the guards, Emery cocked his arm back and hit Taylor in the face—who then fell to the court and smacked his head on the hardwood.

Krystkowiak said after the game that he was incensed by Emery's punch and what appeared to be further taunting by the freshman guard as well as a lack of discipline by BYU coach Dave Rose concerning the play. Krystkowiak initially noted that he felt subsequent apologies from Emery and BYU coach Dave Rose lacked sincerity but after sincere text messages between Krystkowiak and Emery, Krystkowiak accepted his apology considered the situation resolved. The West Coast Conference, the league in which BYU plays, ultimately suspended Emery for one game but BYU took no additional disciplinary action—further souring Krystkowiak's view of the ordeal.

The game's cancellation, the first interruption in the series since World War II, drew mixed views from local and national media. Most Utah fans and some among national sports media, including ESPN hosts Tony Kornheiser and Michael Wilbon, applauded Krystkowiak's decision to cancel the game —citing incidents that have given BYU athletics a reputation for "dirty play" in recent years. Krystkowiak called his decision largely as “protecting myself from myself”. A few of the local media, most of the BYU fanbase, and even Utah Governor Herbert criticized the move, citing the deep historical significance of the series. Cougar fans called the move petty, noting that a Utah player had allegedly slapped a BYU player five years previous.

Utah's football program took a two-year break in the series to play Michigan in a home and home series (with Utah winning both games); the break ended early when the two schools ended up playing against each other in the 2015 Las Vegas Bowl. They resumed regular football contests in 2016, with a game scheduled every year through 2024. Utah won nine straight games against BYU in the series from 2009 through 2020.

== Highlights ==
=== Basketball ===
- March 5, 1983– Provo

Utah (14–13, 9–5) beats BYU (14–13, 10–4) in an epic triple-overtime game. In doing so, Utah clinched a co-conference championship and the accompanying NCAA tournament berth.

Utah 64, BYU 62 (3OT)

- January 14, 1984– Provo

For the second year in a row, a Marriott Center crowd witnesses an overtime shootout between BYU (6–4, 0–0) and Utah (6–6, 0–0). This time, the game went to double overtime, and BYU left with the victory.

BYU 113, Utah 105 (2OT)

- March 2, 1985– Provo

For the third year in a row, BYU (15–12, 9–6) and Utah (12–15, 7–8) play a multiple overtime game at the Marriott Center. In the final seconds of the third overtime, Utah freshman Bobby Adair hits the game winning shot.

Utah 86, BYU 85 (3OT)

- February 27, 1988– Salt Lake City

Earlier in the season, a highly favored BYU team beat Utah 82–64 in Provo, extending their record to 17–0, and earning a #3 national ranking. BYU would eventually climb as high as #2, but three weeks later, the Utes (16–9, 8–5) upset the #2 Cougars (23–2, 12–1) in Salt Lake City. Utah's Keith Chapman scored two 3-point shots in the final 90 seconds, including the game-winning shot at the buzzer.

Utah 62, BYU 60

- March 8, 1990– El Paso, TX

After missing the majority of the season due to health problems, Utah coach Rick Majerus watched the game from the stands as the Utes (15–13, 7–9) and Cougars (21–7, 11–5) met in the first round of the WAC Tournament. The highly favored BYU squad was able to establish a nine-point lead with 11:23 left in the game, but Utah, led by Josh Grant, Craig Rydalch, and Walter Watts, fought back to force overtime. Once again, BYU was able to establish a seemingly-comfortable 5-point lead with 34 seconds left in OT, but Utah would close the game by hitting two 3-pointers, including the game winner by Tommy Connor (who played with a broken finger) with seven seconds left. Andy Toolson led the Cougars with 21 points, but star senior Marty Haws was held to nine.

Utah 62, BYU 61 (OT)

- March 9, 1991– Laramie, WY

BYU (19–12, 11–5) and Utah (28–2, 15–1) met in the 1991 WAC Championship game. The Utes came back from a nine-point second half deficit to force overtime. But with the game tied, Utah's Tyrone Tate committed a foul, which allowed BYU's Nathan Call to put the Cougars up by two from the free-throw line with :08 left. On the ensuing possession, Utah's Josh Grant spotted Tate all alone under the basket. Tate got the pass, but his wide-open lay-up bounced off the rim. He managed to grab the rebound, but his put-back attempt also bounced off as time expired. BYU's 7-foot-6 freshman Shawn Bradley led all scorers with 21 points; he also added 13 rebounds and five blocked shots.

BYU 51, Utah 49 (OT)

- February 27, 1993– Salt Lake City

Perhaps the most highly anticipated BYU/Utah game ever. BYU (22–5, 14–1) and Utah (21–3, 14–1) entered the game tied for first-place in the WAC. Additionally, Utah was ranked No. 11 in the nation, and BYU was No. 23. After playing close for nearly 30 minutes, Utah opened up a 12-point lead and never trailed from then on. Utah's Phil Dixon scored a career-high 28 points, and Josh Grant pulled down 22 rebounds. Gary Trost scored 26 for the Cougars.

Utah 89, BYU 83

- January 8, 1994– Salt Lake City

The second-largest crowd ever in the Huntsman Center saw BYU (8–3, 1–1) steal one from Utah (7–4, 1–1) in Salt Lake. Down by two with 16-seconds left and 3-seconds on the shot-clock, Robbie Reid nailed a 25-foot three-pointer. Ten seconds later, Utah's Craig Rydalch hit the apparent game winning lay-up, but he was called for charging. Reid, a true freshman and the coach's son, went 4–6 from beyond the arc, including the game winner. Another true freshman, Keith Van Horn, had 21 points for the Utes. The Cougars wouldn't win again at the Huntsman Center until the 2006–07 season.

BYU 64, Utah 62

- March 10, 1994 – Salt Lake City:

"The Great Caucasian Shootout"

Utah (14–13, 8–10) became the victim of a BYU (19–8, 12–6) “statement game” in the WAC Tournament. BYU Coach Roger Reid allowed his starters to play the majority of the game, despite leading by as many as 33 points. The Cougars shot 73.9% from the field in the first half, and 63.5% for the game.

BYU 98, Utah 67

- March 10, 2000 – Las Vegas, NV

Having lost the last 12 meetings, BYU (19–9, 7–7) finally beat Utah (22–7, 10–4), and they did it during the inaugural Mountain West Conference Tournament. The Cougars staged a 12–3 run to start the second half and go up 38–33. Utah managed to tie it up at 42, but with 8:39 remaining BYU took the lead for good. BYU forward Eric Nielsen, who scored a career-high 17 points, called the victory “a dream come true.” BYU's Director of Basketball Operations, Jeff Judkins (former Utah basketball star and assistant coach and later BYU's women's basketball coach), added: “It feels just like Christmas!”

BYU 58, Utah 54

- February 23, 2002– Provo

Just one minute into the second-half, Utah (19–5, 9–2) had built up a 21-point lead. But from there, BYU (16–8, 6–5), led by Matt Montague and Travis Hansen, outscored the Utes 34–14, including a 3-pointer by Montague to cut the Utah lead to one with 1:18 left. Less than a minute later, Montague found Eric Nielsen, whose 15-foot shot gave BYU their first lead of the game, and which proved to be the game winner. The win extended the Cougars' homecourt winning-streak to 35 games.

BYU 63, Utah 61

- January 25, 2003– Provo

BYU (13–4, 2–0) had extended their homecourt winning-streak to 44 games, the nation's longest streak. Meanwhile, Utah (13–4, 1–1) entered Provo without coach Majerus, who was in Southern California attending the funeral for the stepfather of former Ute star Andre Miller. Both teams played extremely well and extremely close- where an 8-point Ute lead early in the game would be the largest lead for either team. For BYU, Travis Hansen had 21 points and 12 rebounds, Rafael Araújo had 19 points and nine rebounds, and Mark Bigelow added 16 points. However, it would not be enough to continue the streak. Utah's backup guard Marc Jackson scored 17 points to lead the Utes. With ice in his veins, he hit all 13 of his free throws, including four crucial attempts in the final 15 seconds of the game to seal the win. The Utes also got double-digit points from Tim Frost (16), Nick Jacobson (13), and Britton Johnsen (12). The win gave Utah a 117–116 series edge.

Utah 79, BYU 75

=== Football ===
- October 10, 1942– Salt Lake City

BYU (1–1, 0–1) finally beat Utah (0–2, 0–0) after going winless for the first 20 games of the rivalry. Down by two late in the fourth quarter, BYU blocked a punt, and the ball rolled out of bounds at the Utah 10-yard line. Four plays later, BYU's Herman Longhurst ran in the winning touchdown from three yards out. Immediately after the game, Cougar fans stormed onto the field and tore down the goalposts, igniting a celebration that continued for three days. The following Monday, the Mayor of Provo formally proclaimed an official day of celebration.

BYU 12, Utah 7

- November 26, 1953– Salt Lake City:

NBC was on hand to broadcast one of the first nationally televised college football games ever. Approximately 60 million viewers tuned in to watch the Thanksgiving Day event, in which Utah (7–2, 4–0) was favored to beat the Cougars (2–6–1, 0–4) by 24 points. BYU kept it close during the first half for a 13–13 halftime score, but in the third quarter Utah quickly jumped out to a 13-point lead and looked as though they might in fact cover the spread after all. However, BYU would stage a comeback- scoring two quick touchdowns to tie the game at 26. Utah took the lead again, as RB Don Peterson scored on a two-yard run to make the score 33–26. Then, with 90 seconds left in the game, BYU's QB Henry West completed a 32-yard touchdown pass to Phil Oyler. But the game-tying extra point attempt failed, and Utah escaped with a narrow win.

Utah 33, BYU 32

- November 18, 1978– Salt Lake City

One year after Utah coach Wayne Howard waged a "crusade to beat BYU," the Utes (5–3, 2–2) and Cougars (7–2, 5–0) squared off at Rice Stadium on a cold November afternoon. BYU's promising new QB, Jim McMahon, led the Cougars to a 16–0 halftime lead, and it appeared that BYU was headed for their seventh straight win over the Utes. But Utah would dominate the Cougars from then on, holding them to just 6 second-half points. Down by six with 3:30 left in the game, Utah faced a fourth-and-17 from the BYU 19. But Ute QB Randy Gomez would find WR Frank Henry wide open in the southwest corner of the endzone for the game-winning touchdown. It was Gomez's third touchdown pass on the day.

Utah 23, BYU 22

- November 19, 1988– Salt Lake City

The Rice Bowl

Since Utah had last beat BYU in football, the Cougars had gone 104–24, won eight conference championships, and one national championship. The Utes (5–5, 3–4), who entered the game as 11-point underdogs, jumped out to a 21-point lead and never let up until the game was over and the goal posts had been torn down. Utah QB Scott Mitchell finished the day with 384 yards passing, and RB Eddie Johnson added 112 yards on the ground. BYU (8–2, 5–2), on the other hand, gave up eight turnovers, and suffered numerous game-ending injuries at key positions, including to QB Sean Covey. Local companies and fans capitalized on the victory by selling key chains made with pieces of the goal posts, and tee-shirts which proclaimed: "I was there: 57–28!"

Utah 57, BYU 28

- November 19, 1989– Provo

The Great Ute-shoot

After the '88 "Rice Bowl" victory for the Utes, BYU fans had a mind for revenge prior to the '89 game in Provo. 66,110 fans filled the stadium for a game frequently overlooked by Utah fans which saw the two teams combine for over 100 points. Scott Mitchell who had passed for nearly 400 yards the year before could only watch from the sidelines as his understudy Mike Richmond struggled against BYU's defense. Before most fans were in their seats BYU had jumped out to a 14–0 lead. BYU held a 49–0 lead before the Utes would score their first touchdown in a game so lopsided BYU quarterback Ty Detmer was given permission to visit the restroom during the game. At halftime the score was 49–7. In the 4th quarter down 63–10 Utah would go on to score 3 touchdowns against BYU's defensive reserves.

BYU 70, Utah 31

- November 20, 1993– Provo:

34–31, pt. I

For the first time in 21 years, Utah (6–5, 4–3) beats BYU (5–4, 5–1) in Provo. With the game tied at 31, and only seconds remaining in the game, the Utes found themselves on the BYU 38-yard line, and with no option other than to send in their field goal kicker. Utah's kicker, Chris Yergensen, had already missed two out of three FGs on the day. And when he was not missing FGs, he was consulting with a sideline psychologist that the team had brought in for his benefit. Nevertheless, Yergensen was sent into the game and promptly kicked the game-winning 55-yard field goal (the longest of his career) as time expired.

Utah 34, BYU 31

- November 19, 1994– Salt Lake City:

34–31, pt. II

For the first time ever, both BYU and Utah entered the game ranked in the AP poll: BYU (9–2, 6–1) was No. 20 and Utah (8–2, 5–2) was No. 21. The game also featured six lead changes, including a 27-yard touchdown pass from John Walsh to Mike Johnston to put BYU ahead by four with 2:15 remaining. But Ute freshman Cal Beck returned the ensuing kickoff 67 yards to the Cougar 32; and three plays later, Utah QB Mike McCoy found RB Charlie Brown for a 20-yard touchdown strike with just 56 seconds left to retake the lead. In the final seconds of the game, BYU was able to move to ball all the way up to the Ute 34, but Utah's Bronzell Miller forced a fumble that teammate Luther Elliss recovered to preserve the win: 34–31... again.

Utah 34, BYU 31

- November 21, 1998– Salt Lake City:

“The Doink Heard 'Round Utah”

Once again, a close, hard-fought game goes down to the final seconds, and the outcome hinged on a single play. BYU (8–3, 6–1) was able to extend their lead to nine with an FG with 2:41 left in the game. However, Utah (7–3, 5–2) began a wild comeback when Daniel Jones returned the ensuing kickoff 95 yards to cut the Cougar lead down to two. Then, after forcing BYU to punt on their next possession, Utah's offense promptly marched the ball down the Cougar 15-yard line to set up the potential game-winning field goal. But Utah's Ryan Kaneshiro's 32-yard field goal attempt bounced audibly off the right goalpost as time expired. The term "doink" comes from the description of the play given to local media outlets by former Cougar QB Steve Sarkisian who was on the BYU sideline during the game.

BYU 26, Utah 24

- November 24, 2000– Salt Lake City:

“LaVell's Last Miracle”

Both the Utes (4–6, 3–3) and Cougars (5–6, 3–3) were finishing unremarkable seasons, but this game stood significant in the fact that BYU's coach LaVell Edwards had recently announced his retirement, making the game his last. His Cougar team led 26–10 at the end of the third quarter, but the night was just getting started. The Utes scored 17 points during the fourth quarter, including a 20-yard touchdown pass from Darnell Arceneaux to Matt Nickle with 2:16 remaining. Leading by one point, Utah's defense had BYU pinned: fourth down and 13 yards to go from their own 17, and about one minute left. Appropriately, Edwards' last game would end in miraculous fashion. Cougar QB Brandon Doman found WR Jonathan Pittman for a 34-yard completion to sustain the drive. Then on the next play, Doman completed a 36-yard pass to Pittman. Two plays later, Doman ran in the winning touchdown with only 13 seconds left.

BYU 34, Utah 27

- November 17, 2001– Provo

BYU was ranked No. 8, undefeated (10–0, 6–0), and hoping to become the first BCS non-AQ team ever to earn an invitation to a BCS bowl. However, with 3½ minutes left in the fourth quarter, the Cougars found themselves trailing 21–10 to Utah (7–2, 4–1) in front of packed crowd of 66,149. For the second year in a row, QB Brandon Doman engineered a dramatic late-game comeback against the Utes. This time, Doman led the Cougars 92 yards in 2:25, capped off with a seven-yard touchdown pass to star RB Luke Staley. Staley cut the Utah lead to three with a two-point conversion run. Then, after holding the Utah offense to a three-and-out, BYU got the ball back with 2:11 remaining...which was more time than they'd need. The Cougars quickly moved the ball up to the Utah 30, and with 1:16 left, Staley took a pitch from Doman and rushed down the sideline for the winning touchdown. Utah's final drive got as far as the BYU 30, but Jernaro Gilford intercepted a Lance Rice pass to seal the win.

BYU 24, Utah 21

- November 22, 2003– Provo

The Snow Bowl

For the first time since 1957, Utah (8–2, 5–1) clinched an outright conference championship; and they did it on the road, in a snowstorm, against BYU (4–7, 3–3). Fans who braved the snow and 19 degree temperature were treated to a hard-fought defensive showdown. With 8:43 left in the second quarter, Utah's Bryan Borreson kicked a 41-yard field goal to put the Utes up 3–0, Utah's only points of the day. The Ute defense held two Cougar QBs to a combined total of 41 yards passing and allowed BYU's offense to cross the 50-yard line only once all game. It was the first time in 361 straight games that BYU was held scoreless in a game (ending an NCAA record), and the first time in 33 years that they were shut out at home.

Utah 3, BYU 0

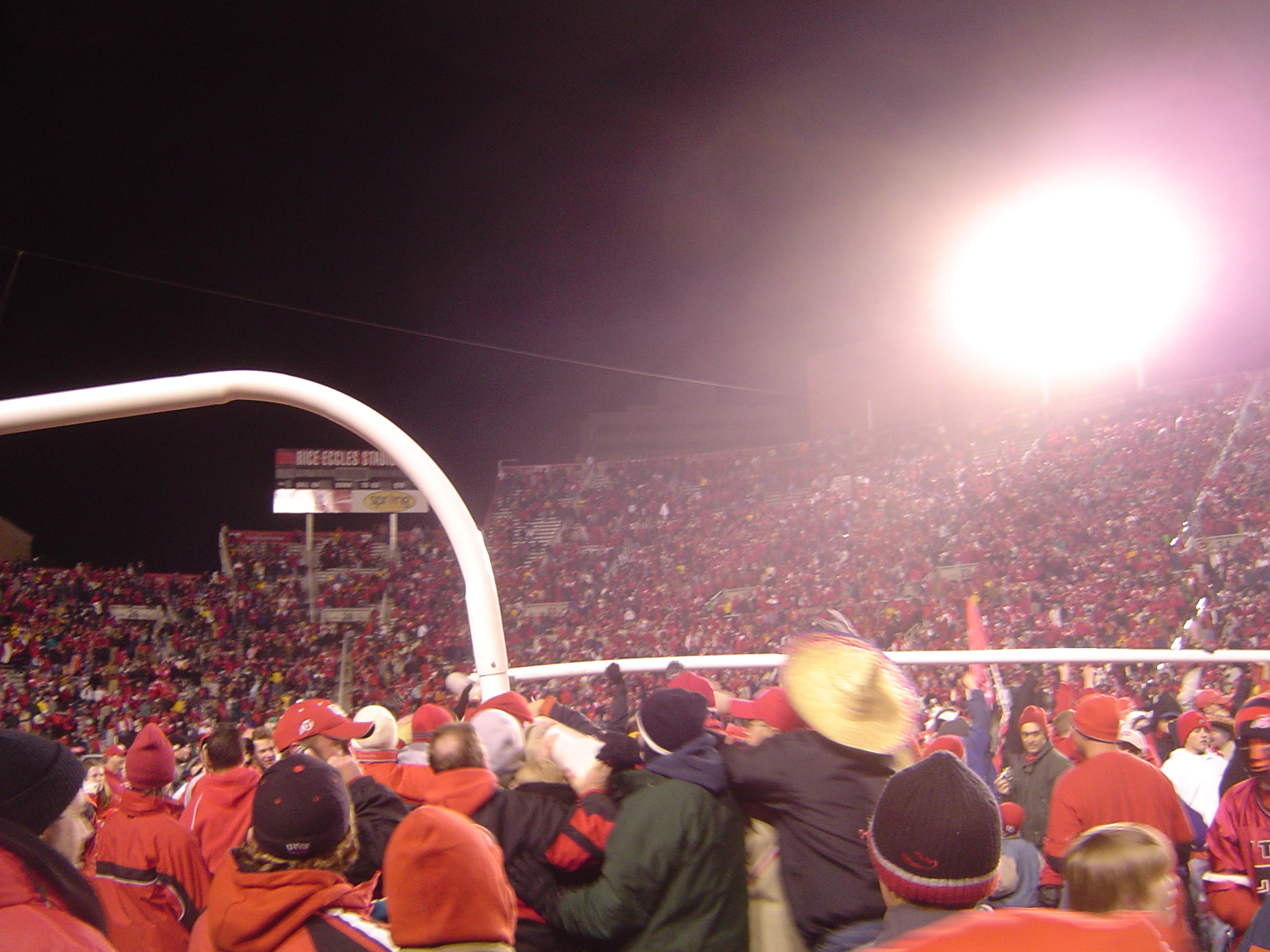
Utah Utes fans rush the field and carry the goalpost after defeating rival BYU, completing a perfect regular season, and becoming the first BCS Buster by clinching a spot in the 2005 Fiesta Bowl (hence the sombrero).

- November 20, 2004– Salt Lake City:

“BCS Busters”

The Utes (10–0, 6–0) were ranked No. 6 in the Coaches' Poll, #5 in the AP, and on the verge of being guaranteed the first-ever BCS bowl berth for a BCS non-AQ team. The Cougars (5–5, 4–2) kept pace with the Utes through the first half, and twice intercepted passes from Alex Smith (who had been intercepted only two times in the ten games prior). The Utes outscored the Cougars 31–7 in the second half to secure the win, and sombrero-clad fans (expecting a Fiesta Bowl invitation) rushed the field as time expired. This was both Gary Crowton's and Urban Meyer's final regular season game as head coach of their respective programs.

Utah 52, BYU 21

- November 19, 2005– Provo

BYU (6–4, 5–2) was headed to their first bowl game in four years, had clinched at least a second-place conference finish, and fans were reeling with excitement about BYU's apparent return to their glory days. Utah (5–5, 3–4), on the other hand, came into the game with a disappointing record, and was forced to start Brett Ratliff, an inexperienced JC-transfer, at quarterback after starter Brian Johnson went down with a season-ending injury the week before.

To everyone's surprise, Utah jumped out to a quick first-half lead. However, BYU would come back, scoring 21 third-quarter points, and forcing overtime for the first time in the series history. In OT, Ratliff hit Travis LaTendresse for a 25-yard touchdown strike. On BYU's ensuing possession, QB John Beck's fourth-down pass landed incomplete in the back of the endzone, just beyond the outstretched arms of Todd Watkins.

Utah 41, BYU 34 (OT)

- November 25, 2006– Salt Lake City

“Harline's still open”

BYU (9–2, 7–0) went into this game undefeated in conference play and enjoying their most successful season in years. After gaining a 14-point first quarter lead, BYU began to fall behind. Utah (7–4, 5–2) took the lead 31–27 with 1:19 left in the game. The cougar offense mounted an impressive 70-yard drive to the Utah 14-yard line. With the game clock displaying zeros, John Beck's completed an 11-yard pass across his body to a wide-open Jonny Harline who caught the ball in the end zone on his knees to win the rivalry for the first time in 4 years.

BYU 33, Utah 31

- November 24, 2007– Provo

“4th & 18”

Both #23 BYU (8–2, 6–0) and Utah (8–3, 5–2) entered this game with high hopes riding large winning streaks. The game started off slow as two top 20 defenses displayed their talent by forcing several punts and turnovers. By halftime, the BYU offense had kicked into gear and had racked up 176 yards to Utah's 33. However, their lead was only 3–0. BYU held the lead until the first touchdown of the game was scored by Utah with 94 seconds remaining in the game, at which point the score was 10–9. Shortly thereafter, the Cougars were facing a 4th-and-18 on their own 12-yard line and were in need of a miracle to avoid a loss in a game they had dominated on the stat sheet. At this point a scrambling Max Hall completed a 49-yard pass to Austin Collie. The drive was capped by an 11-yard touchdown run by Harvey Unga and BYU held on to secure an outright MWC conference championship.

BYU 17, Utah 10

- November 22, 2008– Salt Lake City

“First Team to Bust the BCS Twice”

Both teams entered highly ranked with Utah (11–0, 7–0) at 7/8 and BYU (10–1, 6–1) 14/16. The cougars were hoping to upset the 7th ranked Utes. Playing for a second BCS berth in five seasons, Utah needed to win the Holy War to finish 12–0 and earn a BCS bowl. After Utah jumped out to a first half lead, BYU came storming back to draw it to 27–24 in the 3rd quarter; however, Ute defensive end Paul Kruger intercepted BYU quarterback Max Hall as the Cougars were driving to take the lead, which proved to be a vital turning point in the game. Hall finished the game with 5 interceptions and a fumble and the Utes went on to win 48–24, finishing their season undefeated for the second time in five seasons.

Utah 48, BYU 24

- November 28, 2009– Provo

BYU and Utah both came in with successful seasons, building up anticipation between the fans. The Utes took an early lead, 6–0, but the Cougars quickly responded, scoring the next 20 points to take the lead 20–6. The Utes came back in the fourth quarter and tied the game, sending it to overtime. Utah had the first overtime possession, scoring a field goal and bringing the score to 23–20. On BYU's possession, Max Hall threw the ball to Andrew George, who caught the ball and dodged two Utes tacklers, Joe Dale and Stevenson Sylvester, who collided, and George completed the touchdown.

BYU 26, Utah 23 (OT)

- November 27, 2010– Salt Lake City

Utah entered the game ranked No. 22 but were coming off of critical losses in games versus Texas Christian University and Notre Dame after ascending to a #8 AP ranking in their final season in the Mountain West. BYU came in riding a four-game winning streak after starting the season 2–5. With Utah being outscored 13–0 in the first half the Utes made a push in the second and went up 17–16 with an Asiata run late in the game. The game hinged upon a final field goal attempt by BYU. The kick attempt was blocked by Brandon Burton, thus securing Utah's victory and another thrilling Holy War.

Utah 17, BYU 16

- September 17, 2011– Provo

BYU and Utah both came in with losses the previous week to Texas and USC, respectively. Manned by QB Jake Heaps the BYU offense gave up seven turnovers and the defense allowed multiple large scoring plays and allowed 172 rushing yards to RB John White III culminating in a thoroughly dominating and lopsided 54–10 Utah win in front of a sold out LES.

Utah 54, BYU 10

- September 15, 2012– Salt Lake City

With Utah joining the Pac-12 Conference and BYU going independent in 2010, this was the second year the teams had not played in the same division since 1922. The teams recently announced that they will play in 2013 and 2016 but skip the 2014 and 2015 seasons. This will end a 67-year straight "Holy War" match up.

The game was tied 7:7 at the half. In the 3rd quarter, Utah scored 17 unanswered points. BYU managed to close the gap in the 4th quarter, scoring 14 unanswered points of their own. With only a few seconds left on the clock, a BYU pass was tipped and fell short of its receiver. The clock showed 0:00 and the Ute fans rushed the field. On further review, it was found that there was in fact 1 second left as the ball hit the ground, allowing for one more BYU play. With a chance to tie the score, BYU attempted a field goal which was blocked by Utah. The fans, who had not exited the field fully to the stands, again rushed the field prematurely. The ball was still live and BYU attempted to run the ball but was unsuccessful. Because there were fans on the field during the play, a "live ball" foul was awarded to BYU, who again had a chance to tie the game with better field position. This time BYU's kick sailed above Utah's defense and had enough height to make the distance, but hit the goal's upright and bounced back into the field. The game was now officially over.

Utah 24, BYU 21

- September 21, 2013– Provo

Utah entered the game 2–1 with an overtime loss in their conference opener to Oregon State the week before. BYU was fresh off a surprising beat down of Texas which brought the cougars record to 1–1. Utah took control defensively in the first half, shutting out the Cougars 13–0 with a variety of explosive plays. BYU was able to rebound in the second half with two drives that ended in field goals; however, Utah drove the field and scored a touchdown to make the score 20–6. BYU kept it close by scoring their first touchdown and only red-zone score of the game. BYU got the ball for one last chance at tying the game but were unsuccessful.

Utah 20, BYU 13

- December 19, 2015 – Las Vegas

"The Holy War in Sin City"

The two-season hiatus of the rivalry was cut short when BYU and Utah received invitations to play the 2015 Las Vegas Bowl. Utah would score five touchdowns in the first quarter, securing a 35–0 lead. Utah would not score any further points, and BYU scored four touchdowns through the three remaining quarters. However, they were not enough to tie or overtake Utah.

Utah 35, BYU 28

- September 10, 2016 – Salt Lake City

The game started well with BYU and Utah each with points on the board after the first quarter. (Score of 7–6, favoring Utah) The next quarter brought on a touchdown for each teams, bringing the score up to 14–13. The third quarter did not bring much to the scoreboard other than a field goal made by Utah. In the fourth quarter, Utah scored another field goal bringing the score up to 20–13, and BYU scored a touchdown within the last few moments of the game. the touchdown (making the score 20–19), BYU tried for a 2-point conversion that could have won them the game. QB Taysom Hill had intentions of handing the ball off or passing, but a Utah defensive blitz caused him to keep the ball and rush towards the end zone. Hill was tackled at the three yard line, thus ending a 6th straight win for Utah over BYU.

Utah 20, BYU 19

- September 9, 2017 – Provo

Utah started off the game with a first-quarter field goal and during the second quarter scored a touchdown, leading at half with a 9–0 lead. BYU responded to the score with a touchdown, making the score 9–6. Utah, however, scored a touchdown and completed the PAT and a field goal as well later in the third quarter. The fourth quarter remained scoreless except for a BYU touchdown that included a completed PAT, thus creating a seventh straight win for Utah over BYU.

Utah 19, BYU 13

- November 24, 2018 – Salt Lake City

BYU came into the game with a 6–5 record on the season, and #17-ranked Utah came into the season with an 8–3 record. It seemed that BYU would start off horribly again as they had been all season, but the punt that followed the opening drive landed in the hands of a Utah special teams member, and was dropped. It was recovered by BYU and the drive that followed led to their first touchdown. With a 6–0 score because of a missed PAT, Utah was forced to punt on their next drive and BYU scored another touchdown within the next 2 minutes, creating a score of 13–0. Utah once again had to punt the ball with their next drive, giving BYU the ball. BYU scored, now leading 20–0. Utah punted on their next drive, followed by BYU punt. Now with the ball, Utah attempted a field goal, but it was blocked by BYU special teams member Khyris Tonga.

With a BYU-favored score of 20–0 at the half, Utah responded with a pick-six thrown by BYU QB Zach Wilson. BYU then responded with another score, after receiving a short field due to a ten-yard Utah punt, making the score 27–7. During the fourth quarter, Utah proceeded to score 28 unanswered points, making a 35–27 lead. Attempting to come back from the 8-point lead that Utah had gained in the second half, BYU tried to rush the ball for a first on a fourth down and five. The attempt failed, giving Utah the ball with less than a minute on the clock, sealing a 35–27 comeback win and an eighth straight victory over BYU.

Utah 35, BYU 27

- August 29, 2019 – Provo

BYU and Utah opened the 2019 football season with their 100th meeting in the Holy War rivalry; Utah aimed to continue its eight-game winning streak against BYU.

Utah 30, BYU 12

- September 11, 2021 – Provo

In a game Utah was favored and in which they hoped to continue their nine-game winning streak, BYU never trailed while Utah committed two turnovers in a hard-fought game. Ultimately, BYU scored a late field goal to go back up by two scores, while defensively were able to hold off Utah's last drive and then offensively to get a first down to seal the victory ending Utah's recent streak.

BYU 26, Utah 17

- November 9, 2024 – Salt Lake City

In a highly anticipated matchup between longtime rivals, No. 9 BYU entered Rice-Eccles Stadium aiming to preserve their undefeated season, while Utah sought to halt a four-game losing streak. The game began with BYU taking an early lead through a 23-yard field goal by Will Ferrin. Utah responded in the second quarter with a 20-yard touchdown pass from Brandon Rose to Brant Kuithe, followed by a 96-yard kickoff return for a touchdown by BYU's Keelan Marion. Utah then scored two more touchdowns before halftime, establishing a 21–10 lead.

The second half saw BYU's defense shutting out Utah, while the Cougars' offense chipped away at the deficit. A 33-yard field goal in the third quarter and a 1-yard touchdown run by quarterback Jake Retzlaff in the fourth brought BYU within two points. With under two minutes remaining, a controversial defensive holding penalty against Utah extended BYU's final drive. Capitalizing on this, Retzlaff led the Cougars into field goal range, allowing Ferrin to kick a 44-yard game-winning field goal with four seconds left. The victory marked BYU's first win in Salt Lake City since 2006 and ended Utah's recent dominance in the rivalry.

BYU 22, Utah 21

- October 18, 2025 – Provo

The 2025 matchup had considerably more anticipation leading into it than much of the past decade's entries. BYU again came into the rivalry contest unbeaten (6–0) and ranked 15th in the country. Utah (5–1), with a much-improved offense after a staff overhaul, sat at 23rd in the nation, marking the first time since 2009 that both teams were ranked.

The game was tight throughout. Utah, led by new starting quarterback Devon Dampier, outgained the Cougars by over 100 yards, including posting 226 yards from one of the country's leading rushing attacks. However, miscues and failures to capitalize on opportunities plagued the Utes all night; they turned the ball over twice and were penalized 12 times for 77 yards. BYU responded with a strong ground game of their own, racing for a 202-yard night spearheaded by veteran running back LJ Martin and true freshman signal-caller Bear Bachmeier. Despite both teams' general success moving the football (both averaged over 5 yards per play), both teams' defenses also kept the opposition out of the end zone for much of the night, with BYU holding a slim 10–7 lead after three quarters. After the Utes took their first lead of the game (14–10) early in the fourth, BYU rattled off two consecutive touchdowns to regain a 24–14 lead, punctuated by an explosive and physical 22-yard touchdown run from Bachmeier. The Utes would add a late score to cut the deficit to three, but failed to convert an onside kick, leading BYU to secure the win, 24–21. The win also gave BYU its first three-game win streak in the series since they won four straight from 1989 to 1992.

== See also ==
- List of NCAA college football rivalry games
- Beehive Boot The larger in-state football rivalry that includes Utah State for the awarded trophy, the Beehive Boot.
- Old Oquirrh Bucket historic trophy for Basketball, that includes additional Utah schools.
