= Manase Tonga =

American football player and coach (born 1984)

BYU Cougars
- Title: Graduate Assistant

Personal information
- Born: February 28, 1984 (age 42); San Mateo, California, U.S.
- Listed height: 5 ft 11 in (1.80 m)
- Listed weight: 245 lb (111 kg)

Career information
- High school: Aragon (San Mateo)
- College: Brigham Young University
- NFL draft: 2010: undrafted

Career history

Playing
- Oakland Raiders (2010–2011); Sacramento Mountain Lions (2012)

Coaching
- BYU (2018-present) (GA)

Career NFL statistics
- Rushing yards: 12
- Rushing yards: 12
- Receptions: 3
- Receiving yards: 18
- Stats at Pro Football Reference

Manase Tonga (born February 28, 1984) is an American former professional football player who was a fullback in the National Football League (NFL). He played college football for the BYU Cougars. Tonga was signed by the Oakland Raiders as an undrafted free agent in 2010, cut at the conclusion of the preseason, and subsequently signed to the practice squad.

== Early life ==
Tonga attended Aragon High School in San Mateo, California, where he was an All-County and All-League selection he also had his jersey retired. He also holds several rushing records there, including yards in a season and yards in a game.

== College career ==
After graduating from high school and serving a LDS church mission to Honduras, Tonga attended Brigham Young University and served as a lead blocker for all-time rusher Harvey Unga. Tonga scored 22 touchdowns both rushing and receiving.

== Professional career ==
Tonga was signed by the Oakland Raiders in April 2010 after going undrafted in the 2010 NFL draft. He was cut by the Oakland Raiders in September 2010 when teams were required to get rosters down to 53 players, but then was re-signed to the practice squad. In 2011, Tonga was released during final cuts by the Raiders, but later was re-signed to the practice squad the next day. Tonga was signed to the active roster on October 8, 2011. Tonga was released from the Raiders on August 29, 2012.

=== BYU Cougars ===
Tonga is currently working as a graduate assistant coach at BYU under head coach Kalani Sitake.
