= Matt Reynolds (American football) =

American football player (born 1986)

No. 66, 77
- Position: Offensive tackle

Personal information
- Born: May 31, 1986 (age 40); Provo, Utah, U.S.
- Listed height: 6 ft 4 in (1.93 m)
- Listed weight: 310 lb (141 kg)

Career information
- High school: Timpview (Provo, Utah)
- College: Brigham Young
- NFL draft: 2012: undrafted

Career history
- Carolina Panthers (2012)*; Philadelphia Eagles (2012–2013)*; Kansas City Chiefs (2013)*
- * Offseason or practice squad member only

Awards and highlights
- 2× First-team All-MW (2009, 2010); Freshman All-American (2008)
- Stats at Pro Football Reference

Matt Reynolds (born May 31, 1986) is an American former professional football offensive tackle. He attended Brigham Young University and went undrafted in the 2012 NFL draft.

== Early life ==
Reynolds attended Timpview High School in Provo, Utah, where he was a three-time all-state offensive lineman and helped the team to the 4-A State Championship as a senior. Reynolds was named Utah Gatorade Player of the Year and Parade High School All-American in 2005.

Regarded as a four-star recruit by Rivals.com, Reynolds was listed as the No. 4 guard prospect of the class of 2005. He had scholarship offers from numerous programs, including Arizona State, California, and Nebraska, but eventually picked BYU, where his father and his two older brothers went.

== College career ==
After spending a couple of years on a Church mission in Munich, Germany, Reynolds joined the BYU Cougars varsity in 2008. He started all 13 games in 2008 at left tackle for an offensive unit that led the Mountain West Conference and ranked No. 6 nationally in passing per game (310.38) and No. 16 in total offense (444.77). He was named Freshman All-American by the Football Writers Association of America, Rivals.com, College Football News and Sporting News.

In his sophomore season, Reynolds started all 13 games on the season, at left tackle for an offensive unit that led the conference and ranked No. 17 nationally in passing per game (281.46) and No. 21 in total offense (427.15). He was selected All-Mountain West Conference First-team for the 2009 college football season as voted on by the Mountain West coaches and select media panel.

== Personal life ==
His father, Lance Reynolds, spent the 1978 NFL season with the Philadelphia Eagles and retired in 2012 from being the assistant head coach at BYU. His older brothers, Lance Jr., and Dallas, were offensive linemen for BYU. Lance Jr. played for the Seattle Seahawks for one season and Dallas was a member of the New York Giants & Philadelphia Eagles. His younger brother Houston was an offensive lineman for BYU.
