= Dennis Pitta =

American football player (born 1985)

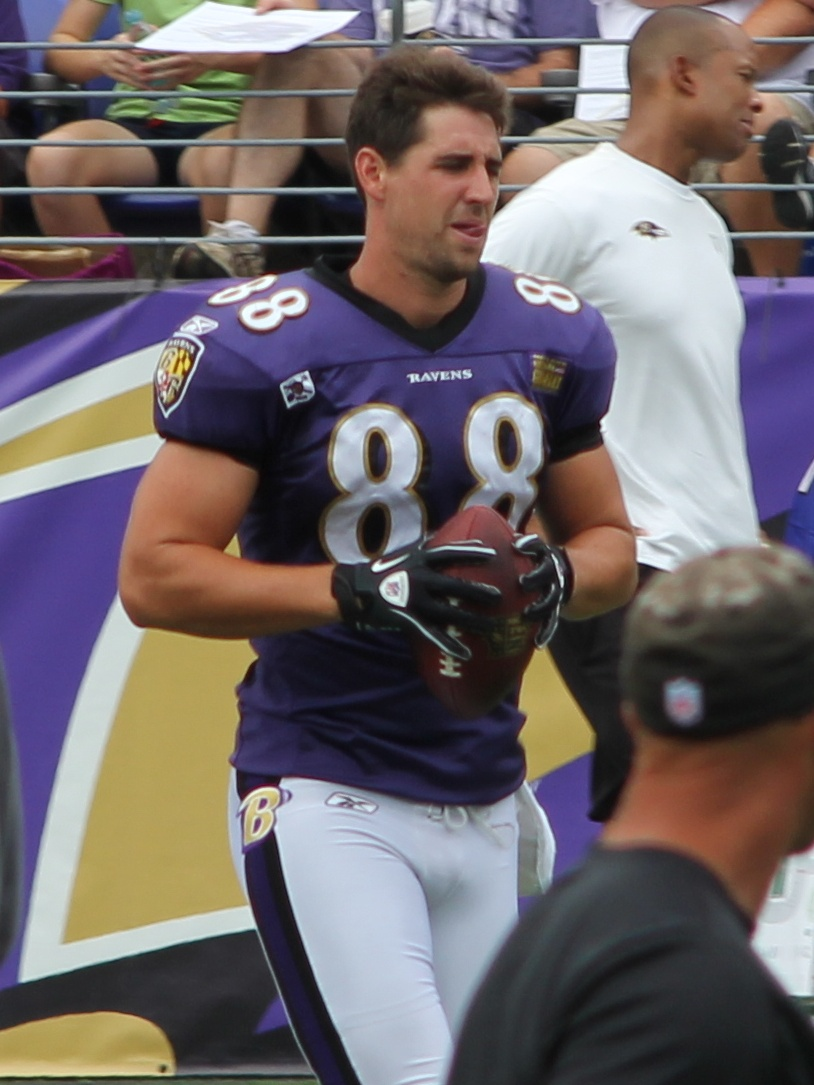
- Pitta with the Baltimore Ravens in 2011

No. 88
- Position: Tight end

Personal information
- Born: June 29, 1985 (age 41); Fresno, California, U.S.
- Listed height: 6 ft 4 in (1.93 m)
- Listed weight: 238 lb (108 kg)

Career information
- High school: Moorpark (Moorpark, California)
- College: BYU (2003–2004, 2007–2009)
- NFL draft: 2010: 4th round, 114th overall pick

Career history
- Baltimore Ravens (2010–2016)

Awards and highlights
- Super Bowl champion (XLVII); Consensus All-American (2009); 3× First-team All-MW (2007, 2008, 2009)

Career NFL statistics
- Receptions: 224
- Receiving yards: 2,098
- Receiving touchdowns: 13
- Stats at Pro Football Reference

Dennis Gregory Pitta Jr. (born June 29, 1985) is an American former professional football player who was a tight end for the Baltimore Ravens of the National Football League (NFL). He played college football for the BYU Cougars, earning consensus All-American honors in 2009. He was selected by the Ravens in the fourth round of the 2010 NFL draft. After two strong seasons in the NFL, Pitta suffered a hip injury in 2013 and played only occasionally until 2016, when he set a career high in receiving yards. A further injury in 2017 ended his career.

== Early life ==
Pitta was born in Fresno, California to parents Dennis and Linda Pitta. His father played college football as a middle linebacker for California from 1968 to 1969. Pitta attended Moorpark High School in Moorpark, California, where he earned letters in football, basketball, and track. He is an Eagle Scout. He played football as a wide receiver and cornerback, and his large size made him difficult to cover. As a senior in 2002, Pitta recorded 64 receptions for 1,150 yards and 13 touchdowns. That season, he was named a first-team all-county, all-league, and all-area player. He was a scholar-athlete all four years in high school and was also named a National Football Foundation Scholar Athlete. Pitta was shown interest by Dartmouth, Navy, Oklahoma State, Oregon, Utah, and Yale, but no Division I school offered him a scholarship.

== College career ==
Pitta chose to attend Brigham Young University, where he walked onto the BYU Cougars football team as a wide receiver. Pitta was moved to tight end by head coach Gary Crowton, where he soon earned a scholarship. He sat out the 2003 season on "grayshirt" status. In 2004, he saw significant playing time as a result of an injury to starter Daniel Coats. Pitta recorded 17 receptions for 176 yards and two touchdowns, and actually finished the season with more receptions than Coats. Both of his scores came in the game against Air Force, where he also blocked a punt upon which BYU capitalized for a score.

Pitta is a member of the Church of Jesus Christ of Latter-day Saints. Pitta served a mission for the church in the Dominican Republic, which caused a two-year hiatus in his college football career. He returned to BYU for the 2007 season, and recorded 59 receptions for 813 yards and five touchdowns. He finished the season as the nation's fifth-leading tight end in yards per game at 63. Pitta was named to the All-Mountain West Conference (MWC) first-team, and he also received Academic All-MWC honors.

In 2008, he recorded 83 receptions for 1,083 yards and six touchdowns. Against Northern Iowa, he compiled 213 yards, which broke the conference receiving yards record for a tight end and earned him the John Mackey Tight End of the Week honors. Against Colorado State, he caught the game-winning 17-yard touchdown pass from quarterback Max Hall, and was named the John Mackey Tight End of the Week and a MWC Co-Offensive Player of the Week. Pitta finished the season as the team's second-leading receiver. He was a Lombardi Award and Biletnikoff Award candidate, and a Mackey Award semifinalist. Pitta was named to the All-MWC first-team, and again received Academic All-MWC honors. College Football News and Sports Illustrated named him an honorable mention All-American, and Rivals.com named him to its All-America third-team.

Prior to the 2009 season, The NFL Draft Scout, a CBS Sports affiliate, rated Pitta as the sixth-ranked out of 92 tight ends available for the 2010 NFL draft. They project him as being selected in the third or fourth round. Phil Steele's assessed him as the fourth-ranked draft-eligible tight end and placed him on its preseason All-America fourth team. He finished the 2009 season with 62 receptions for 829 yards and eight touchdowns.

He was one of three finalists for the Mackey Award. He was named to the 2009 All-MWC first-team and the 2009 AFCA Coaches' All-America team.

Dennis Pitta, Reception Records in BYU Cougars football History

Category	Number	BYU Rank, All Time	Notes
Career receptions	221	1st	Passed Austin Collie (215) in 2009
Career receiving yards	2,883	3rd	1st for TEs
Season receiving yards	1,083	8th	1st for TEs
Career receiving touchdowns	21	6th (tied with Mike Chronister)	2nd for TEs behind Gordon Hudson (22)

== Professional career ==
Pre-draft measurables
Height	Weight	Arm length	Hand span	40-yard dash	10-yard split	20-yard split	20-yard shuttle	Three-cone drill	Vertical jump	Broad jump	Bench press	Wonderlic
6 ft 4 1/2 in (1.94 m)	245 lb (111 kg)	32 1/4 in (0.82 m)	10 in (0.25 m)	4.72 s	1.64 s	2.76 s	4.17 s	6.72 s	34 in (0.86 m)	9 ft 5 in (2.87 m)	27 reps	29
All values from NFL Combine

Pitta was selected by the Baltimore Ravens in the fourth round (114th overall) of the 2010 NFL draft. The pick was one of three that the Ravens acquired in a trade with the Denver Broncos on the first night of the draft on April 22. The Broncos received a first-round pick which was used to select Tim Tebow. Pitta was signed to a three-year contract on June 21, 2010.

=== 2010 ===
Pitta recorded his first career reception for one yard in Week 2 against the Cincinnati Bengals. The reception was his only catch of the game and the 2010 season. He appeared in 11 games as a rookie.

=== 2011 ===
Pitta improved greatly in the 2011 season, becoming a common target for quarterback Joe Flacco and contributing to a dangerous tight end tandem alongside starter Ed Dickson. He did not, however, score a touchdown until a Week 12 Thanksgiving Day matchup with the San Francisco 49ers. Pitta scored the game's only touchdown off of an eight-yard catch, as the Ravens won 16–6.

Pitta scored his second touchdown of the season two weeks later in a game against the Indianapolis Colts. In the Ravens' season finale, he was the team's leading receiver with six catches, a then-career-high 62 yards and his third career touchdown. Pitta finished the year with 40 catches, 405 yards and three touchdowns.

Pitta played a steady role in the AFC Championship Game against the New England Patriots, catching five passes for 41 yards, including the Ravens' first touchdown of the game. However, Baltimore's season would come to an end here, after receiver Lee Evans dropped a game-winning touchdown and kicker Billy Cundiff missed a short, game-tying field goal that would have sent the game to overtime.

=== 2012 ===
During Week 15, in a game versus the AFC-leading Denver Broncos, Pitta caught a short pass from Flacco and broke three tackles to complete a 61-yard touchdown towards the end of the game. Pitta finished the game with seven catches for 125 yards and two scores, but the Ravens were still defeated 34–17.

In the 2012 season, Pitta appeared in 16 games and made five starts. He recorded 61 passes for 669 yards and seven touchdowns.

In the 2012–13 playoffs, against the Indianapolis Colts in the Wild Card Round, he caught two passes for 27 yards, including a 20-yard touchdown. In both the Divisional Round against the Denver Broncos and the AFC Championship against the New England Patriots, Pitta had 55 yards apiece, scoring a touchdown in the latter. In Super Bowl XLVII, despite starting the game behind Ed Dickson, Pitta caught four balls for 26 yards and a touchdown to help lead the Ravens to a 34–31 victory over the 49ers. He finished the playoffs with 14 catches, 163 yards and three touchdowns. He was ranked 100th by his fellow players on the NFL Top 100 Players of 2013.

=== 2013 ===
On May 13, 2013, the Ravens announced that Pitta signed his second round restricted free agent tender worth $2.023 million.

On July 27, 2013, Pitta suffered a dislocated and fractured hip during training camp and underwent surgery the same night. Pitta was not immediately placed on injured reserve and examinations of the hip revealed no ligament or cartilage damage, but he was still expected to miss the entire season.

In Week 14 of the 2013 season, Pitta returned to on field action for first time since Super Bowl XLVII. In his return, he recorded a receiving touchdown in a 29–26 win over the Minnesota Vikings. In the 2013 season, he appeared in four games and recorded 20 receptions for 169 yards and a touchdown.

=== 2014 ===
On February 28, 2014, the Baltimore Ravens and Pitta agreed to a five-year $32 million contract. In the regular season opener against the Bengals, he had ten receptions in the game for 83 yards in the loss. The ten receptions marked a career high for Pitta at the time

During a game against the Cleveland Browns on September 21, 2014, Pitta left the game with a hip injury. It was revealed that his right hip was dislocated again. He underwent surgery on the same hip the next day and it prematurely ended his 2014 season after three games.

=== 2015 ===
On September 1, 2015, Pitta was placed on the PUP list. On November 11, 2015, the Ravens reported that doctors informed Pitta that it was not safe for him to continue his career. Pitta was placed on season ending injured reserve later that day, but he stated that he had not yet elected to retire from the NFL.

=== 2016 ===
In 2016, Pitta announced that he was going to return to football whenever he was cleared to play. He resumed full practice in early September. He played in the season opening game on September 11, 2016, in Baltimore against the Buffalo Bills in the 13–7 win. In Week 2 against the Cleveland Browns, Pitta had a game-high nine catches for 102 yards, the second 100-yard game of his career in the 25–20 victory. On Pitta's return, Ravens quarterback Joe Flacco said, "If he was coming back, I knew he would be productive. Last year, when he came back for a couple of weeks of practice and they decided to not have him play, he looked good. He looked like himself. I think he's going to get more and more comfortable as the year goes on. We just have to keep him healthy." On December 4 against the Miami Dolphins, Pitta scored in a game for the first time since Week 14 of the 2013 season. Pitta finished the game with 9 catches for 90 yards and two touchdown receptions in the 38–6 victory. In Week 17, Pitta had a career-high 11 receptions for 91 yards in the loss to the Bengals. Pitta had statistically his best season, recording a career-high 86 receptions, most in the league by a tight end, and a career-high 729 yards, although he only caught two touchdown passes. Pitta also recorded his first career fumble during the game against Miami.

=== 2017 ===
On June 2, 2017, Pitta suffered another hip injury during organized team activities on a non-contact play. It was later determine that he dislocated his hip for a third time. On June 7, Pitta was released by the Ravens.

He agreed to do color commentary on Ravens radio broadcasts for the first four games of the season, joining three other fellow Ravens alumni in the rotation.

== NFL career statistics ==
Regular season

Year	Team	Games		Receiving					Fumbles	
Year	Team	GP	GS	Rec	Yds	Avg	Lng	TD	Fum	Lost
2010	BAL	11	0	1	1	1.0	1	0	0	0
2011	BAL	16	2	40	405	10.1	39	3	0	0
2012	BAL	16	5	61	669	11.0	61	7	0	0
2013	BAL	4	1	20	125	7.8	24	1	0	0
2014	BAL	3	3	16	169	8.4	18	0	0	0
2015	BAL	0	0	Did not play due to injury						
2016	BAL	16	12	86	729	8.5	30	2	1	1
Total		66	23	224	2,098	9.4	61	13	1	1

Playoffs

Year	Team	Games		Receiving					Fumbles	
Year	Team	GP	GS	Rec	Yds	Avg	Lng	TD	Fum	Lost
2010	BAL	0	0	Did not play						
2011	BAL	2	1	7	70	10.0	16	1	0	0
2012	BAL	4	2	14	163	11.6	24	3	0	0
2014	BAL	0	0	Did not play due to injury						
Total		6	3	21	233	11.1	24	4	0	0

== Personal life ==
Pitta is married to Mataya Gissel, whom he met while attending BYU. They have three children together, including a set of twins and his oldest son Decker. He is also brothers-in-law with former Arizona Cardinals' Max Hall, who is married to Gissel's sister, Mckinzi Hall.
