= Dallas Reynolds =

American football player and coach (born 1984)

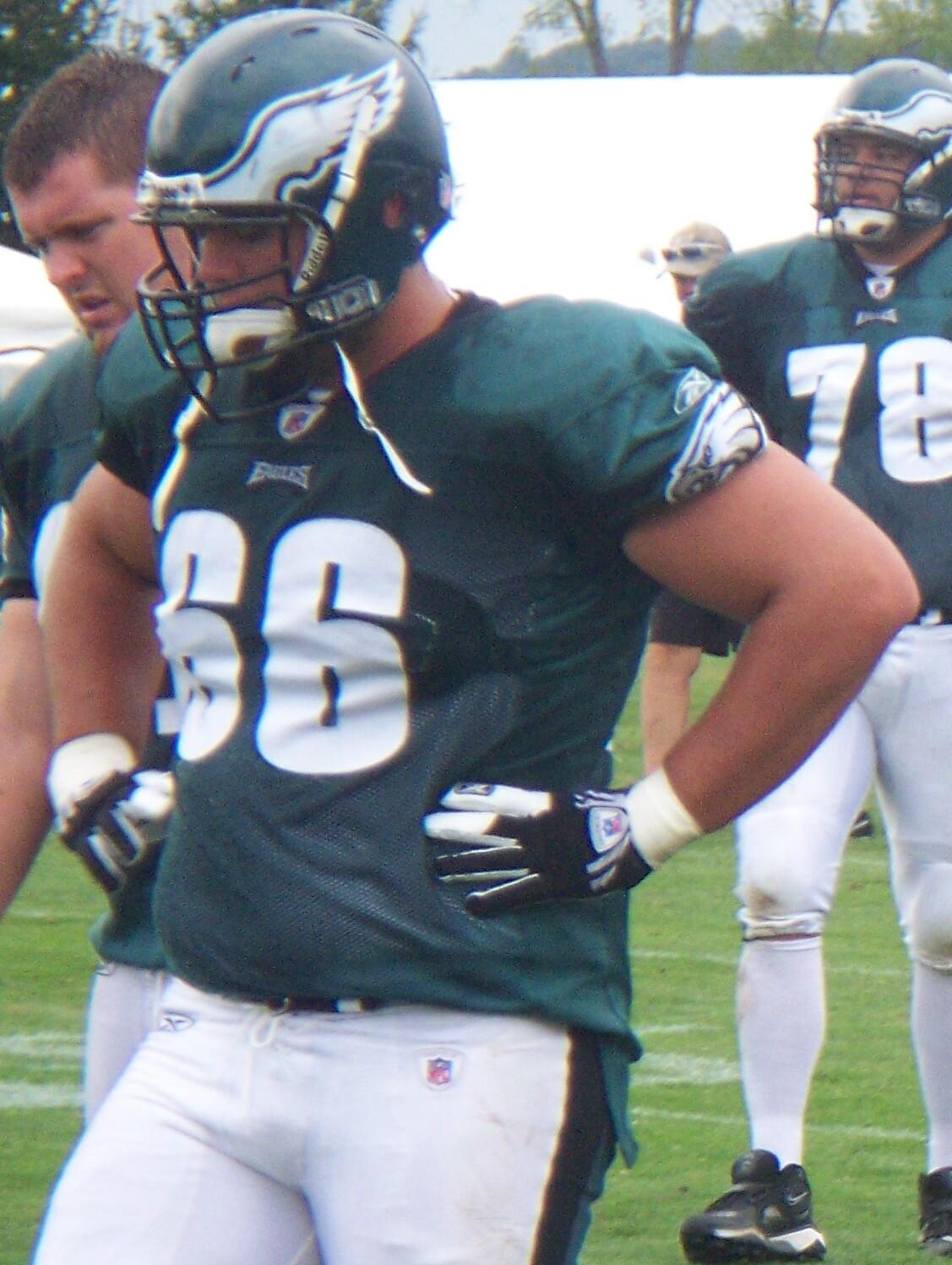
- Reynolds in 2009

No. 66, 65, 61,
- Position: Center

Personal information
- Born: April 23, 1984 (age 42); Salt Lake City, Utah, U.S.
- Listed height: 6 ft 4 in (1.93 m)
- Listed weight: 320 lb (145 kg)

Career information
- High school: Timpview (Provo, Utah)
- College: Brigham Young
- NFL draft: 2009: undrafted

Career history

Playing
- Philadelphia Eagles (2009−2012); New York Giants (2013–2015)

Coaching
- BYU (2017–2018) (GA)

Awards and highlights
- Freshman All-American (2005); 2× First-team All-MW (2007, 2008)

Career NFL statistics
- Games played: 50
- Games started: 16
- Stats at Pro Football Reference

Dallas Reynolds (born April 23, 1984) is an American former professional football player who was a center in the National Football League (NFL). After playing college football for the BYU Cougars, he signed with the Philadelphia Eagles as an undrafted free agent in 2009. He was a member of the Eagles from 2009 to 2013 and the New York Giants from 2013 to 2015.

== Early life ==
Reynolds was born in Salt Lake City, Utah, and attended Timpview High School in Provo, Utah. He earned all-region honors during his junior and senior seasons. He was named team captain as a senior. He was a two-time Deseret News first-team All-State selection.

== College career ==
Reynolds played college football for the BYU Cougars. He earned first-team All-Mountain West honors during his junior and senior years, playing left offensive tackle during his junior year and center during his senior year. He started in 50 games for the Cougars and never missed a game. The offensive line that he was part of at BYU allowed only 1.54 sacks per game. In his sophomore season, he started all 13 games at both offensive tackle spots. The offensive line during his sophomore year helped gain 465.5 yards of total offense per game, which was fourth in the nation. During his freshman season, he earned Freshman All-American honors after he started all 12 games and helped his offense average 33.0 points per game and 462.4 total yards per game.

== Professional career ==
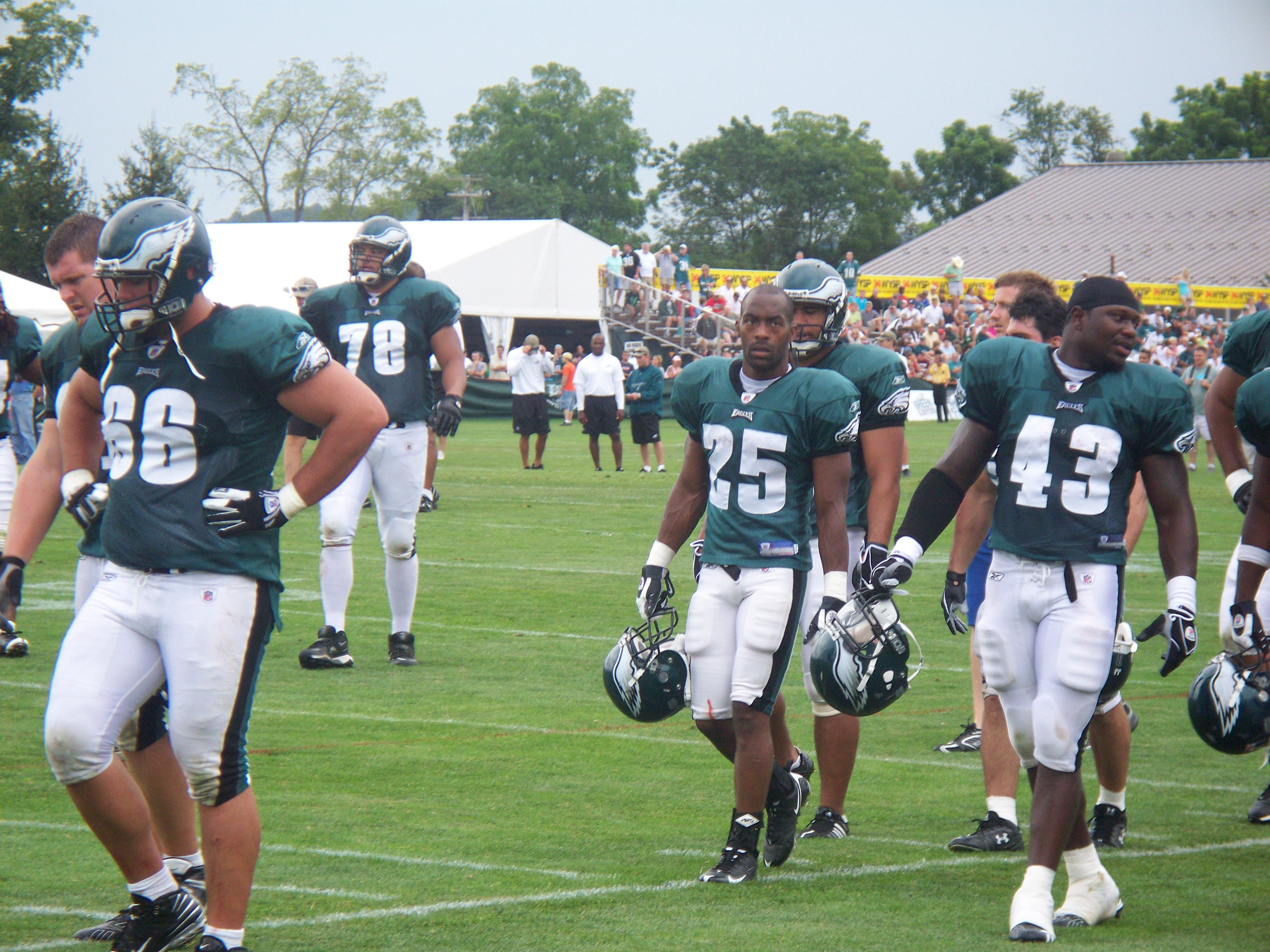
Reynolds (#66) in 2009.

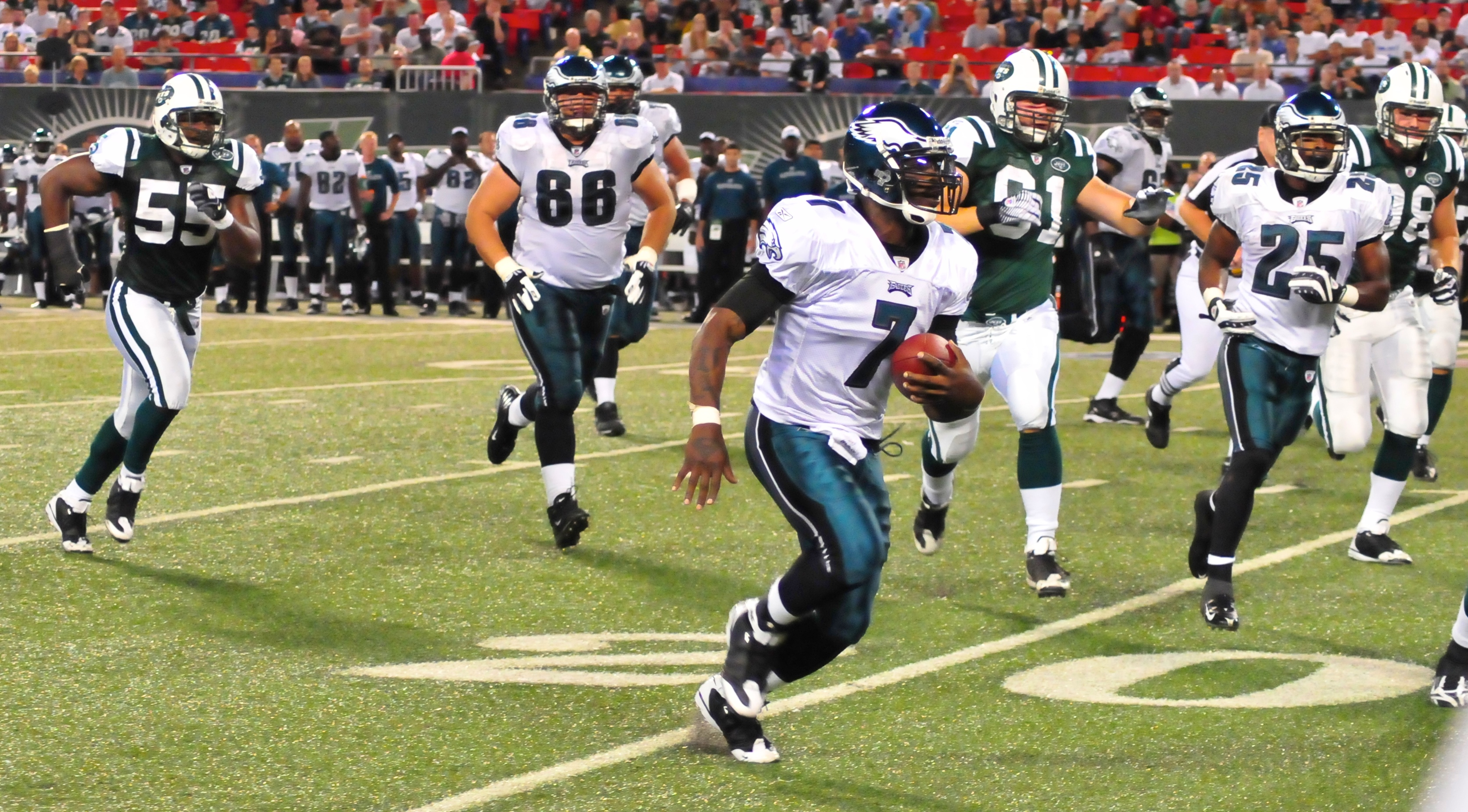
Reynolds (#66) in 2009.

Pre-draft measurables
Height	Weight	40-yard dash	10-yard split	20-yard split	20-yard shuttle	Three-cone drill	Vertical jump	Broad jump	Bench press
6 ft 4 in (1.93 m)	309 lb (140 kg)	5.28 s	1.79 s	2.98 s	5.03 s	7.59 s	30 in (0.76 m)	8 ft 2 in (2.49 m)	28 reps
All values from Pro Day workout on March 11, 2009

=== Philadelphia Eagles ===
Reynolds was signed as an undrafted free agent by the Philadelphia Eagles on April 27, 2009. He was waived on September 5, 2009, but was re-signed to the Eagles' practice squad on October 21 after Mike Gibson was signed off the practice squad by the Seattle Seahawks. Reynolds was promoted to the active roster on December 29 after Jamaal Jackson was placed on injured reserve with a torn anterior cruciate ligament (ACL).

Reynolds was waived on September 4, 2010, during final cuts, and re-signed to the team's practice squad the next day. He spent the entire season on the practice squad, and was re-signed to a future contract on January 10, 2011.

Reynolds was waived again during final cuts on September 2, 2011. Reynolds was re-signed to the teams practice squad on September 4. At the conclusion of the 2011 season, his practice squad contract expired and he became a free agent. He was re-signed to the active roster on January 5, 2012.

Reynolds replaced injured starting center Jason Kelce in a week 2 game against the Baltimore Ravens on September 16, 2012. Kelce suffered torn ligaments in his knee, causing him to miss the remainder of the season, and Reynolds started the remaining 14 games of the season.

Reynolds was released during final roster cuts one last time by the Eagles on August 31, 2013.

=== New York Giants ===
Reynolds signed with the New York Giants on October 1, 2013. He was released on October 5, 2013, but later re-signed on October 24, and appeared in three games during the season.

Reynolds became an exclusive rights free agent after the season, and re-signed with the team on April 21, 2014. He played in 15 games as a reserve lineman in 2014.

Prior to becoming a free agent, Reynolds re-signed with the Giants on February 19, 2015. He played in all 16 games in 2015, and started in two games. He became a free agent after the season and did not sign with another team.

=== BYU Cougars ===
Reynolds worked as a graduate assistant coach at BYU under head coach Kalani Sitake in 2017 and 2018.

== Personal life ==
Reynolds is a member of the Church of Jesus Christ of Latter-day Saints. Reynolds' wife, Suzanne, gave birth to their first child in September 2009. Reynolds served a church mission in Seattle, Washington. Reynolds' father, Lance Sr., has been at BYU as the associate head coach and running backs coach for over 28 years, and spent the 1978 NFL season with the Eagles. His older brother, Lance Jr., played college football for BYU, as a center, and played for the Seattle Seahawks for a season. His younger brothers are Matt, an offensive lineman for the Philadelphia Eagles & Kansas City Chiefs, and Houston, who is currently an MD and a former offensive lineman for BYU whose career was cut short because of injury.
