= Ray Feinga =

American football player (born 1986)

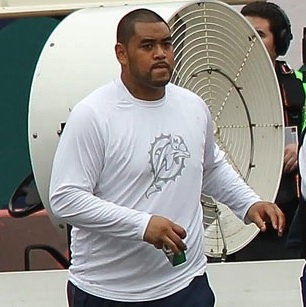
- Feinga with the Miami Dolphins in 2012

No. 69, 76
- Position: Guard

Personal information
- Born: May 8, 1986 (age 40); San Bruno, California, U.S.
- Listed height: 6 ft 5 in (1.96 m)
- Listed weight: 320 lb (145 kg)

Career information
- High school: Hunter (West Valley City, Utah)
- College: BYU
- NFL draft: 2009: undrafted

Career history
- St. Louis Rams (2009)*; San Diego Chargers (2009)*; Miami Dolphins (2009–2012); San Jose SaberCats (2014–2015)
- * Offseason or practice squad member only

Awards and highlights
- 2× First-team All-MW (2007, 2008)

Career NFL statistics
- Games played: 3
- Stats at Pro Football Reference

Ray Feinga (born May 8, 1986) is an American former professional football player who was a guard in the National Football League (NFL). He was signed by the St. Louis Rams as an undrafted free agent in 2009. He played college football for the BYU Cougars.

Feinga was also a member of the San Diego Chargers, Miami Dolphins, and San Jose SaberCats.

== Early life ==
Feinga was an All-State selection as a senior and led Hunter High School, West Valley City, Utah to the State Championship. He was named 2003 Mr. Football in the state of Utah as a senior and Gatorade player of the year. He was selected to the U.S Army All-American Bowl. Additionally, he was named Hunter's Most Valuable Player and earned region defensive player of the year and MVP. He was an All-State and All-Region selection as a junior as well after recording more than 70 tackles and nine sacks on defense.

== College career ==
Feinga was a two-time First-team All-Mountain West Conference pick at left guard while at BYU. He was also a Second-team All-America selection in 2007. Feinga redshirted as a true freshman in 2004. In 2005, he played in eight games during the season with one start. As a sophomore, he played in all 13 games and started at left guard in 10 games. In 2007, he started 12 of 13 games at left guard for the Cougars. He did not allow a single sack all season despite recording more than 70 knock-down blocks. He was named All-Mountain West Conference for his efforts. He was again All-MWC in 2008 as a senior after starting all 13 games in 2008 at left guard.

== Professional career ==
=== Pre-draft ===
The 6-foot-4 1/8-inch (1.934 m), 337-pound (153 kg) Feinga did 30 reps at 225 pounds (102 kg) at the NFL Combine. Feinga did not participate in any of the agility drills at the BYU Pro Day due to a pulled his left hamstring and only lifted.

=== St. Louis Rams ===
On April 27, 2009, Feinga was signed by the St. Louis Rams as an undrafted free agent. He was waived on July 1.

=== San Diego Chargers ===
Feinga signed with the San Diego Chargers on August 13, 2009 but was cut during final cuts on September 5.

=== Miami Dolphins ===
Feinga was signed to the practice squad of the Miami Dolphins on December 15, 2009. After his contract expired at season's end he was re-signed to a future contract on January 5, 2010. He was waived on September 4, 2010. On September 29, Feinga was added to the active roster, he was waived on October 4. He was suspended for four games the following day. Feinga returned to the practice squad following the suspension and on December 8, 2010 was signed to the Dolphins 53 man active roster after Al Harris was put on season ending IR. On September 8, 2011, he was waived by Miami. Feinga was added to the practice squad on September 20, 2011. Feinga was added back to the active roster on November 30, 2011. On August 31, 2012 Feinga was released by Miami. On September 4, 2012, Feinga was re-signed by Miami after releasing QB David Garrard. On September 25, 2012 Feinga was released by Miami.

=== San Jose SaberCats ===
Feinga was assigned to the San Jose SaberCats of the Arena Football League on December 20, 2013.
