= Max Hall (gridiron football) =

American football player (born 1985)

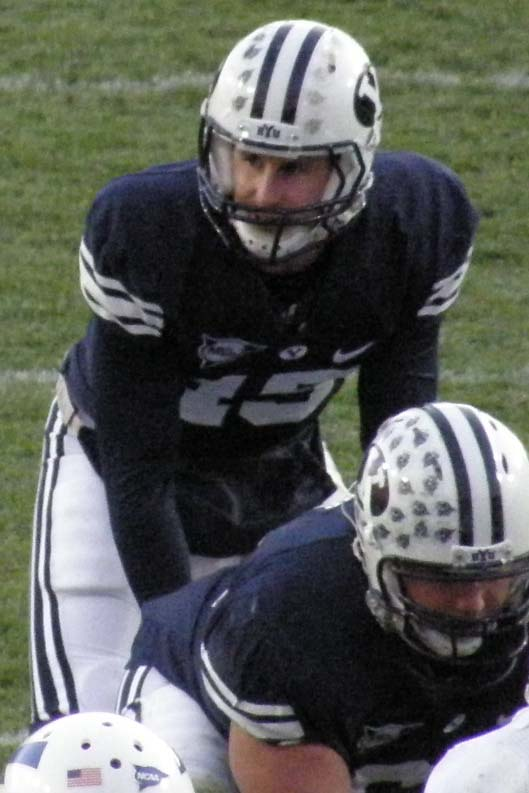
- Hall with the BYU Cougars in 2009

No. 6, 15
- Position: Quarterback

Personal information
- Born: October 1, 1985 (age 41); Mesa, Arizona, U.S.
- Listed height: 6 ft 1 in (1.85 m)
- Listed weight: 205 lb (93 kg)

Career information
- High school: Mountain View (Mesa)
- College: Arizona State (2004); BYU (2006–2009)
- NFL draft: 2010: undrafted

Career history

Playing
- Arizona Cardinals (2010–2011); Winnipeg Blue Bombers (2013)

Coaching
- BYU (2012) Student assistant coach

Awards and highlights
- First-team All-MW (2007); 2× Second-team All-MW (2008, 2009)

Career NFL statistics
- Passing attempts: 78
- Passing completions: 39
- Completion percentage: 50.0%
- TD–INT: 1–6
- Passing yards: 370
- Passer rating: 35.7
- Stats at Pro Football Reference
- Stats at CFL.ca (archive)

Max Hall (born October 1, 1985) is an American former professional football player who was a quarterback in the National Football League (NFL) and Canadian Football League (CFL). After playing college football for the BYU Cougars, he was signed by the Arizona Cardinals as an undrafted free agent in 2010. Hall played in a total of six NFL games for the Cardinals. Hall spent 2012 as an assistant coach for BYU. He then played the 2013 CFL season for the Winnipeg Blue Bombers.

== Early life ==
Hall grew up in Mesa, Arizona. He went to the same high school as John Beck, the quarterback he succeeded at BYU. As a junior in 2003, he earned the starting quarterback job for the Mountain View High School Toros, and led the team to the Arizona state championship (14–0), earning MVP and offensive player of the year. As a senior in 2004 he led his team to another state title game only to lose the game in triple overtime (an Arizona 5A state record). He broke several Toro career passing records just two years after Beck had broken them. Hall was named the All-Arizona quarterback for his senior year by The Arizona Republic.

== College career ==
Hall redshirted at Arizona State in 2004. In 2006, after being sent home early from his LDS mission to Iowa, Hall transferred to BYU and quarterbacked the scout team while sitting out the season.

In 2007, John Beck's departure from BYU left a wide open competition for the starting quarterback position. Cade Cooper, a junior college transfer from Snow College, and Brenden Gaskins, a junior college transfer from Glendale Community College, joined Hall and Jacob Bower to compete for the position. Bower transferred to Bakersfield College soon after, and the competition came down to Hall and Cooper. Cooper suffered a season-ending injury in the annual Spring game. BYU head coach Bronco Mendenhall immediately named Hall as the starting quarterback and Gaskins as the backup for the 2007 season.

Hall was named first-team All-Mountain West Conference as a sophomore after throwing for 3,848 yards, 26 touchdowns, and only 12 interceptions. His 137.7 rating was the 21st best in BYU history, and the fifth best by a sophomore. His 3,848 yards ranked 8th in the NCAA and his 26 touchdown throws tied Hall for 22nd in the NCAA. His record in his first season as BYU starting quarterback was 11–2, with a Pioneer Las Vegas Bowl victory over UCLA.

On November 22, 2008, Hall was intercepted five times and lost one fumble, contributing to a 24–48 loss to the University of Utah. After the game, he proclaimed that Utah didn't beat BYU but that BYU beat themselves. On September 5, 2009, Hall led his team to a win over then third-ranked Oklahoma, throwing for 328 yards and two touchdowns in a 14–13 victory. This performance garnered the Cougars a No. 9 ranking in the following AP poll. However, BYU was then beaten by Florida State and TCU at home.

On December 1, 2009, Hall was named to the Mountain West Conference football All-Conference Second-team. On December 22, 2009, Hall led his team to a 44–20 win over 18th-ranked Oregon State, completing 19 out of 30 passes for 192 yards and three touchdowns to end his senior season.

== Professional career ==
Pre-draft measurables
Height	Weight	Arm length	Hand span	40-yard dash	10-yard split	20-yard split	20-yard shuttle	Three-cone drill	Vertical jump	Broad jump
6 ft 0 5/8 in (1.84 m)	209 lb (95 kg)	30 in (0.76 m)	9 in (0.23 m)	4.77 s	1.66 s	2.75 s	4.35 s	7.07 s	32 in (0.81 m)	8 ft 6 in (2.59 m)
All values from NFL Combine/Pro Day

=== Arizona Cardinals ===
After not being selected in the 2010 NFL draft, Hall signed as an undrafted free agent with the Arizona Cardinals. In the preseason, Hall competed with John Skelton, another rookie and a 5th round selection from Fordham, for the third-string quarterback spot behind veterans Derek Anderson and Matt Leinart. On September 4, the Cardinals released Leinart and told Hall that he would be the primary backup quarterback behind Anderson for 2010.

While playing the Atlanta Falcons on September 19, 2010, Hall relieved Anderson, throwing two passes for three yards and one interception. In an October 3 game against the San Diego Chargers, Anderson threw two interceptions and was taken out in favor of Hall. Hall completed 8 of his 14 passes for 82 yards.

On October 10, Hall was named the starting quarterback for the Cardinals, and won the first NFL game he started, against the defending Super Bowl champion New Orleans Saints. He completed 17 of his 27 passes and passed for 168 yards and 0 touchdowns. He also threw 1 interception and fumbled twice. The Cardinals won the game 30–20. After this performance, Hall was named the Pepsi Rookie of the Week for Week 5.

On October 31, Hall threw his only career touchdown pass as an NFL quarterback against the Tampa Bay Buccaneers. The score came off of a 3-yard pass to Larry Fitzgerald in the first quarter. Hall would be pulled in the second quarter though in favor of Derek Anderson. Hall would complete 8 of 16 passes passing for 71 yards with two interceptions.

Hall was waived/injured on August 24, 2011, and was reverted to injured reserve after passing through waivers unclaimed on August 25. After being released by the Cardinals, Hall did not play professional football throughout the remainder of 2012.

=== Winnipeg Blue Bombers ===
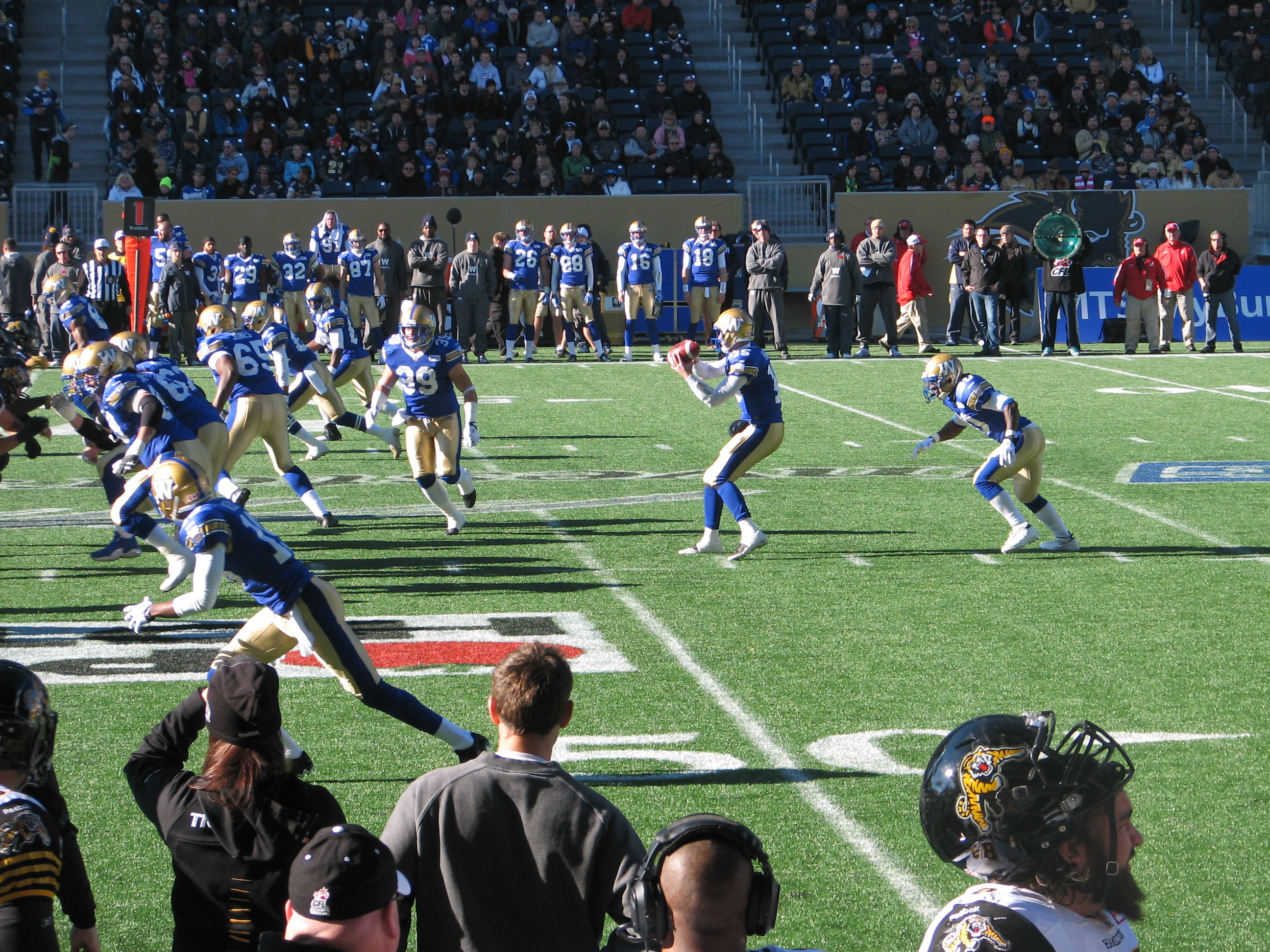
Max Hall, photographed on November 2, 2013, during the last regular season game for the Winnipeg Blue Bombers of the 2013 CFL Season. Hall is seen in the centre of the photo, the starting QB for the Winnipeg Blue Bombers. The final score was Hamilton 37, Winnipeg 7.

On April 8, 2013, the Winnipeg Blue Bombers of the Canadian Football League announced they signed Hall for the 2013 season. Hall made his first CFL start on August 16, 2013 (Week 8) against the Hamilton Tiger-Cats. Hall got the start because of 'poor' play by both Buck Pierce and Justin Goltz. He completed 18 of 30 passing attempts for 241 yards with 1 touchdown and 2 interceptions. Hall went on to post a 1–8 record as a starter.

== Career statistics ==
=== NFL ===
Year	Team	Games		Passing								Rushing				Sacks		Fumbles	
Year	Team	GP	GS	Cmp	Att	Pct	Yds	Y/A	TD	Int	Rtg	Att	Yds	Avg	TD	Sck	SckY	Fum	Lost
2010	ARI	6	3	39	78	50.0	370	4.7	1	6	35.7	1	−5	−5.0	0	14	90	5	2
Career		6	3	39	78	50.0	370	4.7	1	6	35.7	1	-5	-5.0	0	14	90	5	2

=== College ===
Year	Team	Games			Passing								Rushing			
Year	Team	GP	GS	Record	Comp	Att	Pct	Yards	Avg	TD	Int	Rate	Att	Yards	Avg	TD
2004	Arizona State	Redshirt (redshirt)														
2005	Arizona State	Did not play/not on roster due to mission trip														
2006	BYU	Ineligible to play due to transfer														
2007	BYU	13	13	11−2	298	496	60.1	3,848	7.8	26	12	137.7	52	14	0.3	1
2008	BYU	13	13	10−3	330	477	69.2	3,957	8.3	35	14	157.2	65	115	1.8	4
2009	BYU	13	13	11−2	275	409	67.2	3,560	8.7	33	14	160.1	72	75	1.0	2
Career		39	39	32−7	903	1,382	65.3	11,365	8.2	94	40	151.1	189	204	1.1	7

== Coaching career ==
Hall served as a student assistant coach for BYU in 2012. He served as the varsity offensive coordinator at American Leadership Academy High School in Queen Creek, Arizona until October 2nd, 2025.

== Personal life ==
Hall is a nephew to Danny White and grandson of Wilford White, ASU Hall-of-Famers. He is a second cousin to former Baltimore Ravens tight end Todd Heap. Hall is married to Mckinzi Gissel, making him the brother-in-law-by-marriage of his BYU teammate and former Ravens' tight end, Dennis Pitta, who is married to Gissel's sister Mataya. He is a member of the Church of Jesus Christ of Latter-day Saints.

On August 30, 2014, Gilbert police were called to the Best Buy near Loop 202 and Williams Field Road about 11:30 a.m. after a store employee told police he saw Hall taking merchandise out of boxes and stuffing them in his backpack, according to the police report. Police found $286 worth of electronics inside Hall's backpack. Investigators also confiscated hypodermic needles, a metal spoon, a lighter and cocaine, stored in a pill bottle. Hall told police he had used the cocaine that morning. Hall immediately apologized to police and begged for forgiveness from the store's employees. He is quoted as saying, "I'm really sorry, I'll pay for the stuff. If I get arrested, I'll get fired. I've never done this before." On September 5, 2014, Hall was fired from his job as an offensive coordinator at Gilbert High School.

Max sustained several concussions in his NFL career, as well as other injuries, which led to an addiction to analgesics. He has defined the 2014 incident at Best Buy as his rock bottom, and has been clean since the incident. As of April 2022, Hall was coaching varsity football for American Leadership Academy in Queen Creek, Arizona.

== See also ==
- List of Division I FBS passing yardage leaders
