= Fui Vakapuna =

American football player (born 1984)

No. 37
- Position: Fullback

Personal information
- Born: March 9, 1984 (age 42); Salt Lake City, Utah, U.S.
- Listed height: 6 ft 0 in (1.83 m)
- Listed weight: 260 lb (118 kg)

Career information
- High school: East (Salt Lake City)
- College: BYU
- NFL draft: 2009: 7th round, 215th overall pick

Career history
- Cincinnati Bengals (2009)*; Arizona Cardinals (2009)*; Cincinnati Bengals (2009–2010); Indianapolis Colts (2011)*; New York Jets (2012)*
- * Offseason or practice squad member only
- Stats at Pro Football Reference

Fui Vakapuna (pronounced foo-ē vac-uh-poo-nǎ; born March 9, 1984) is an American former professional football player who was a fullback. He was selected by the Cincinnati Bengals in the seventh round of the 2009 NFL draft. He played college football for the BYU Cougars.

== Professional career ==
=== Cincinnati Bengals ===
His attempt to make the Bengals' roster was chronicled on the HBO series Hard Knocks: Training Camp with the Cincinnati Bengals. Vakapuna was released by the Bengals after the preseason and signed to the Arizona Cardinals practice squad. On November 3, 2009 the Bengals re-signed him to their 53-man roster.

=== New York Jets ===
Vakapuna was signed by the New York Jets on May 23, 2012. He was waived with an injury settlement on August 1, 2012.

== Personal life ==
He is a member of the Church of Jesus Christ of Latter-day Saints. He served a mission in the Carlsbad, California area from 2004 until early spring 2006. Vakapuna is a cousin to former Vikings fullback Naufahu Tahi and his father-in-law was American Samoa's governor Eni Faleomavaega. Vakapuna married his wife on July 11, 2009.

Vakapuna has served as the Assistant to the Athletic Director for Student Services at Brigham Young University beginning in 2013.
