= Harvey Unga =

American football player and coach (born 1987)

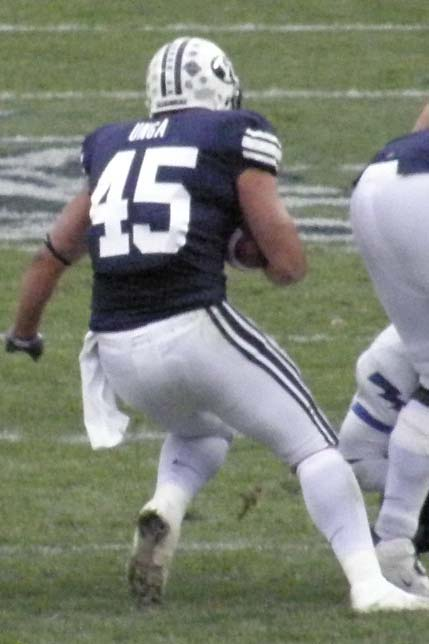
- Unga with the BYU Cougars in 2009

BYU Cougars
- Title: Running backs coach

Personal information
- Born: January 18, 1987 (age 39); Kahuku, Hawaii, U.S.
- Listed height: 6 ft 0 in (1.83 m)
- Listed weight: 237 lb (108 kg)

Career information
- High school: Timpview (Provo, Utah)
- College: BYU
- Supplemental draft: 2010: 7th round

Career history

Playing
- Chicago Bears (2010–2013); Carolina Panthers (2014)*
- * Offseason or practice squad member only

Coaching
- BYU (2016–2019) Graduate assistant; BYU (2020–present) Running backs coach

Awards and highlights
- MW Freshman of the Year (2007); First-team All-MW (2009); 2× Second-team All-MW (2007, 2008)
- Stats at Pro Football Reference

William Harvey Unga (born January 18, 1987) is an American former professional football fullback and the current running backs coach for the BYU Cougars. He was selected by the Chicago Bears in the seventh round of the 2010 NFL supplemental draft. He played college football for the BYU Cougars where he became the school's second all-time leading rusher.

== College career ==
After the season-opener against the Arizona Wildcats in 2007, Unga earned the Mountain West Conference (MWC) offensive player of the week award. He had gained 194 all-purpose yards, with 127 yards coming from receptions. Unga became the starting running back in 2007 due to an injury to Fui Vakapuna in the prior season. As a starter, Harvey rushed for over 1,000 yards in just 11 games, with this mark reached in the second quarter against their in-state rivals, Utah, on November 24, 2007. He was named the MWC Freshman of the Year. He had the second-most yards gained by a freshman in MWC history, and third among all freshman running backs in the nation in 2007.

In 2009, Unga rushed for 1,087 yards and 11 touchdowns, and became the school's second all-time leading rusher with 3,455 yards. He earned first-team All-MWC honors following the season.

On April 16, 2010, Unga voluntarily withdrew from BYU after violating its honor code.

== Professional career ==
=== Supplemental draft ===
Unga declared for the NFL supplemental draft that took place on July 15, 2010. He worked out for 20 NFL teams on July 8 in Utah.

Pre-draft measurables
Height	Weight	40-yard dash	10-yard split	20-yard shuttle	Vertical jump	Broad jump	Bench press
6 ft 0 in (1.83 m)	244 lb (111 kg)	4.59 s	1.60 s	4.39 s	35 in (0.89 m)	9 ft 6 in (2.90 m)	19 reps
All values from workout on July 8.

=== Chicago Bears ===
Unga was selected by the Chicago Bears with a seventh round selection in the 2010 supplemental draft. He was signed to a four-year contract on July 21, 2010.

On August 31, 2011 the Bears received a roster exemption for Unga, who had left the team twice during the preseason for personal reasons. He was placed on the reserve/left squad list on September 20, 2011. Following the 2011 season, Unga was reinstated to the active roster on April 16, 2012.

On August 27, 2012, Unga was waived by the Bears. He was later placed on the practice squad. He was once again waived on October 9, and replaced by Kamar Aiken. On December 4, Unga was brought back to the Bears practice squad. On December 28, Unga was elevated to the active roster. On August 30, 2013, Unga was released. On September 1, Unga was re-signed to the Bears practice squad, However a month later, on October 1, Unga was once again released from the team.

=== Carolina Panthers ===
Unga signed with the Carolina Panthers on August 16, 2014. The Panthers released Unga on August 24, 2014.

=== BYU Cougars ===
Unga is currently serving as the running backs coach at BYU under head coach Kalani Sitake. He was promoted to this position on March 19, 2020 after having worked as a graduate assistant and student assistant since 2015.

== Personal life ==
Unga was born to Jackson and Theresa Unga. His father played running back for the BYU Cougars in the early 1980s.

Since July 16, 2010, he is married to Keilani (née Moeaki), a former BYU women's basketball player, and sister of former Chicago Bears tight end Tony Moeaki. The couple has a son, Jackson (born July 2010), and a daughter, Leila (born August 2011).
