= 2008 Tennessee Volunteers football team =

American college football season

2008 Tennessee Volunteers football
- Conference: Southeastern Conference
- Eastern Division
- Record: 5–7 (3–5 SEC)
- Head coach: Phillip Fulmer (16th season)
- Offensive coordinator: Dave Clawson (1st season)
- Offensive scheme: Multiple
- Defensive coordinator: John Chavis (14th season)
- Base defense: Multiple 4–3
- Home stadium: Neyland Stadium

2008 Southeastern Conference football standings
| | Conf. | | | Overall |
| Team | W | | L | W | | L |
|---|---|---|---|---|---|---|
Eastern Division
| No. 1 Florida x$# | 7 | – | 1 | 13 | – | 1 |
| No. 13 Georgia | 6 | – | 2 | 10 | – | 3 |
| Vanderbilt | 4 | – | 4 | 7 | – | 6 |
| South Carolina | 4 | – | 4 | 7 | – | 6 |
| Tennessee | 3 | – | 5 | 5 | – | 7 |
| Kentucky | 2 | – | 6 | 7 | – | 6 |
Western Division
| No. 6 Alabama x% | 8 | – | 0 | 12 | – | 2 |
| No. 14 Ole Miss | 5 | – | 3 | 9 | – | 4 |
| LSU | 3 | – | 5 | 8 | – | 5 |
| Arkansas | 2 | – | 6 | 5 | – | 7 |
| Auburn | 2 | – | 6 | 5 | – | 7 |
| Mississippi State | 2 | – | 6 | 4 | – | 8 |
Championship: Florida 31, Alabama 20
# – BCS National Champion; $ – BCS representative as conference champion; % – BCS at-large representative; x – Division champion/co-champions; Rankings from AP Poll

The 2008 Tennessee Volunteers football team represented the University of Tennessee in the 2008 NCAA Division I FBS football season. The team was led by head football coach Phillip Fulmer in his 16th and final season as head coach. The Vols played their home games in Neyland Stadium and competed in the Eastern Division of the Southeastern Conference (SEC). The 2008 campaign followed a 10–4 2007 season, which saw the Vols win the Eastern Division of the conference and the Outback Bowl. This season marked the ten year anniversary of Tennessee's 1998 BCS National Championship. On November 3, Fulmer announced that, after winning some 150 games over his career, he would step down from coaching his alma mater at the end of the season.

== Before the season ==
=== Recruiting ===
The Vols followed the previous year of a top 5 class, with an effort that found the team ranked outside of the top 25 by both major recruiting websites, Rivals.com and Scout.com. The top players of the class were considered to be tight end Aaron Douglas out of Maryville, Tennessee and wide receiver/linebacker E.J. Abrams-Ward out of Thomasville, North Carolina.

Douglas played at Tennessee as a redshirt freshman 2009, transferred to Arizona Western College in the 2010 season and winter of 2010 signed with Alabama, where he participated in spring drills. Douglas was recruited to Tennessee as a tight end, and was moved to tackle by then first year coach Lane Kiffin. When Kiffin left Tennessee for USC, Douglas failed to report for spring drills under new coach Derek Dooley (American football) and eventually transferred to Arizona Western.

Douglas redshirted his first season at Tennessee under then coach Phillip Fulmer, and a year later developed into an elite offensive lineman under Kiffin and line coach James Cregg. Douglas told the News Sentinel in May 2010 that a third coach in three years flipped the plan he had mapped out for himself “upside down.”

On Thursday, May 12, 2011, Police received a call at 8:13 a.m. Thursday and, upon investigation, they found Douglas' body on the second-floor balcony of a Fernandina Beach, Florida residence. Douglas was pronounced dead at the scene. Of what was characterized as an accidental drug overdose.

Abrams-Ward, a receiver redshirted for the 2008 season, selecting UT over North Carolina in a heated recruiting battle. On January 22, 2009, UT announced that E.J. Abrams-Ward and Ramone Johnson where no longer members of Tennessee's football team. UT said that the two were dismissed from the team for disciplinary reasons.

College recruiting (2008)
| Name | Hometown | School | Height | Weight | Commit date |
|---|---|---|---|---|---|
| E.J. Abrams-Ward; LB | Thomasville, North Carolina | Thomasville HS | 6 ft 5 in (1.96 m) | 210 lb (95 kg) | Feb 6, 2008 |
| E.J. Abrams-Ward; LB | Recruit ratings: Scout: Rivals: | | | | |
| Carson Anderson; G | Florence, Alabama | Florence HS | 6 ft 2 in (1.88 m) | 275 lb (125 kg) | Mar 31, 2007 |
| Carson Anderson; G | Recruit ratings: Scout: Rivals: | | | | |
| Preston Bailey; T | Nashville, Tennessee | Montgomery Bell Academy | 6 ft 5 in (1.96 m) | 315 lb (143 kg) | Aug 29, 2007 |
| Preston Bailey; T | Recruit ratings: Scout: Rivals: | | | | |
| Ben Bartholomew; FB | Nashville, Tennessee | Montgomery Bell Academy | 6 ft 3 in (1.91 m) | 225 lb (102 kg) | Apr 22, 2007 |
| Ben Bartholomew; FB | Recruit ratings: Scout: Rivals: | | | | |
| Willie Bohannon; DE | Prichard, Alabama | Mattie T. Blount HS | 6 ft 3 in (1.91 m) | 230 lb (100 kg) | Jan 28, 2008 |
| Willie Bohannon; DE | Recruit ratings: Scout: Rivals: | | | | |
| Aaron Douglas; TE | Maryville, Tennessee | Maryville HS | 6 ft 6 in (1.98 m) | 230 lb (100 kg) | Jul 31, 2006 |
| Aaron Douglas; TE | Recruit ratings: Scout: Rivals: | | | | |
| Steven Folkes; DE | College Park, Georgia | Banneker HS | 6 ft 5 in (1.96 m) | 215 lb (98 kg) | Aug 21, 2007 |
| Steven Folkes; DE | Recruit ratings: Scout: Rivals: | | | | |
| Montori Hughes; DT | Murfreesboro, Tennessee | Siegel HS | 6 ft 5 in (1.96 m) | 255 lb (116 kg) | Jan 28, 2008 |
| Montori Hughes; DT | Recruit ratings: Scout: Rivals: | | | | |
| Austin Johnson; LB/RB | Hickory, North Carolina | Hickory HS | 6 ft 3 in (1.91 m) | 240 lb (110 kg) | Sep 24, 2006 |
| Austin Johnson; LB/RB | Recruit ratings: Scout: Rivals: | | | | |
| Casey Kelly; QB | Sarasota, Florida | Sarasota HS | 6 ft 4 in (1.93 m) | 195 lb (88 kg) | Jan 30, 2008 |
| Casey Kelly; QB | Recruit ratings: Scout: Rivals: | | | | |
| Herman Lathers; LB | Baton Rouge, Louisiana | Scotlandville Magnet HS | 6 ft 0 in (1.83 m) | 200 lb (91 kg) | Oct 19, 2007 |
| Herman Lathers; LB | Recruit ratings: Scout: Rivals: | | | | |
| Tauren Poole; RB | Toccoa, Georgia | Stephens County HS | 5 ft 10 in (1.78 m) | 200 lb (91 kg) | Oct 26, 2006 |
| Tauren Poole; RB | Recruit ratings: Scout: Rivals: | | | | |
| StePhan Raines; DB | Coffeyville, Kansas | Coffeyville CC | 6 ft 0 in (1.83 m) | 175 lb (79 kg) | Jan 20, 2008 |
| StePhan Raines; DB | Recruit ratings: Scout: Rivals: | | | | |
| Dallas Thomas; T | Baton Rouge, Louisiana | Scotlandville Magnet HS | 6 ft 5 in (1.96 m) | 280 lb (130 kg) | Feb 6, 2008 |
| Dallas Thomas; T | Recruit ratings: Scout: Rivals: | | | | |
| Prentis Waggner; CB | Clinton, Louisiana | Clinton HS | 6 ft 2 in (1.88 m) | 175 lb (79 kg) | Jan 28, 2008 |
| Prentis Waggner; CB | Recruit ratings: Scout: Rivals: | | | | |
| Marlon Walls; LB1 | Olive Branch, Mississippi | Olive Branch HS | 6 ft 4 in (1.93 m) | 215 lb (98 kg) | Jan 26, 2008 |
| Marlon Walls; LB1 | Recruit ratings: Scout: Rivals: | | | | |
| Rodriguez Wilks; WR | Smyrna, Tennessee | Smyrna HS | 6 ft 1 in (1.85 m) | 195 lb (88 kg) | Sep 19, 2007 |
| Rodriguez Wilks; WR | Recruit ratings: Scout: Rivals: | | | | |
| Gerald Williams; DE/LB | San Francisco, California | San Francisco CC | 6 ft 4 in (1.93 m) | 245 lb (111 kg) | Dec 13, 2007 |
| Gerald Williams; DE/LB | Recruit ratings: Scout: Rivals: | | | | |
Overall recruit ranking: Scout: 35 Rivals: 36
Note: In many cases, Scout, Rivals, 247Sports, On3, and ESPN may conflict in their listings of height and weight.; In these cases, the average was taken. ESPN grades are on a 100-point scale.; Sources: "2008 Tennessee Football Commitment List". Rivals.; "Scout.com Football Recruiting: Tennessee". Scout.; "Scout.com Team Recruiting Rankings". Scout.; "2008 Team Ranking". Rivals.com.

=== Coaching changes ===
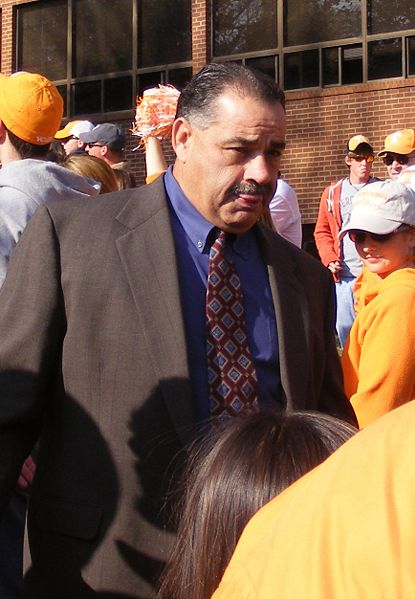
Chavis turned down an offer from the Atlanta Falcons.

Tennessee lost four members of their offensive staff. Offensive Coordinator David Cutcliffe accepted the head coaching position at Duke. Cutcliffe took along OL/TE coach Matt Luke, and RB coach Kurt Roper. Roper joined the Blue Devils' staff as offensive coordinator. WR coach Trooper Taylor also left the Vols for a coordinator position, accepting a job as Co-Offensive Coordinator at Oklahoma State.

Cutcliffe was replaced by Dave Clawson, who comes to Tennessee from the University of Richmond, where he was the head coach. Joining Clawson from Richmond is Latrell Scott, who replaced Taylor as the wide receivers coach. Stan Drayton, formerly the running backs coach at Florida, was hired to replace Roper as the running backs coach. Jason Michael, formerly on the staff for the New York Jets, was hired to coach the tight ends, replacing Matt Luke.

Defensive coordinator John Chavis interviewed with the Atlanta Falcons but chose to stay at Tennessee. This decision followed a similar decision by defensive ends coach Steve Caldwell. In December 2007 Caldwell chose to stay with Tennessee and turned down an offer to be the defensive coordinator at Arkansas.

=== Player news ===
Tennessee was bolstered by the return of safety Demetrice Morley. Morley was a five star recruit out of Miami, Florida who played for the Vols in 2005 and 2006 before being dismissed from the football team and leaving school for academic reasons. After sitting out the 2007 season, Morley was readmitted to the university in January 2008 and will rejoin the team. Morley told the media that he had been living in his car following his dismissal from the team, but that the birth of his son motivated him to return.

Another defensive back, Antonio Gaines, was awarded a sixth year of eligibility by the NCAA in February. Gaines had missed the majority of both the 2003 and 2007 seasons due to injuries.

The Vols are also welcoming two major transfer student athletes. Gerald Williams, who originally signed with Tennessee in 2005 has been cleared to join the team after spending finishing up at San Francisco Junior College. Brandon Warren, a Freshman All American at Florida State has been cleared to play by the NCAA.

=== Discipline ===
The Volunteer football team has also seen its share of off of the field issues since the close of the 2007 season. The first incident of the offseason occurred during a recruiting weekend. Wide receivers Gerald Jones and Ahmad Paige were cited for a misdemeanor possession of marijuana while hosting a recruit. Neither were suspended, but both were required to undertake more frequent drug testing and participate in a police ride along program.

Another incident involved redshirt freshman running back Daryl Vereen. Vereen was arrested and charged with public intoxication and underage consumption after an on campus fight. Vereen was required to perform community service and was under a semester-long curfew. Fulmer also required the entire team to attend 6 A.M. running as punishment for the offense.

Offensive lineman Anthony Parker was arrested and charged with disorderly conduct in January. Parker's punishment included morning runs, curfew, community service and the police ride along program. Parker was charged after failing to obey the commands of a Knoxville police officer with whom he had previous run-ins. This incident was followed by the arrest of incoming walk-on Vincent Faison for DUI. Faison was suspended for two games.

In February, linebacker Dorian Davis and defensive back Antonio Wardlow were dismissed from the team for a violation of team rules. The most recent incident of the offseason involved decorated punter Britton Colquitt. Colquitt was suspended for five games after being arrested and charge with both DUI and leaving the scene of an accident. Colquitt also had his scholarship revoked.

== Schedule ==
| Date | Time | Opponent | Rank | Site | TV | Result | Attendance |
|---|---|---|---|---|---|---|---|
| September 1 | 8:00 pm | at UCLA* | No. 18 | Rose Bowl; Pasadena, CA | ESPN | L 24–27 ^{OT} | 68,546 |
| September 13 | 12:30 pm | UAB* | | Neyland Stadium; Knoxville, TN | Raycom | W 35–3 | 98,205 |
| September 20 | 3:30 pm | No. 4 Florida | | Neyland Stadium; Knoxville, TN (rivalry) | CBS | L 6–30 | 106,138 |
| September 27 | 3:30 pm | at No. 15 Auburn | | Jordan–Hare Stadium; Auburn, AL (rivalry) | CBS | L 12–14 | 87,451 |
| October 4 | 7:00 pm | Northern Illinois* | | Neyland Stadium; Knoxville, TN | PPV | W 13–9 | 99,539 |
| October 11 | 3:30 pm | at No. 10 Georgia | | Sanford Stadium; Athens, GA (rivalry) | CBS | L 14–26 | 92,746 |
| October 18 | 7:00 pm | Mississippi State | | Neyland Stadium; Knoxville, TN | PPV | W 34–3 | 98,239 |
| October 25 | 7:45 pm | No. 2 Alabama | | Neyland Stadium; Knoxville, TN (Third Saturday in October) | ESPN | L 9–29 | 106,138 |
| November 1 | 7:00 pm | at South Carolina | | Williams-Brice Stadium; Columbia, SC | ESPN2 | L 6–27 | 81,731 |
| November 8 | 1:00 pm | Wyoming*^{†} | | Neyland Stadium; Knoxville, TN | | L 7–13 | 99,489 |
| November 22 | 12:30 pm | at Vanderbilt | | Vanderbilt Stadium; Nashville, TN (rivalry) | Raycom | W 20–10 | 38,725 |
| November 29 | 6:30 pm | Kentucky | | Neyland Stadium; Knoxville, TN (Battle for the Barrel) | ESPN2 | W 28–10 | 102,388 |
*Non-conference game; ^{†}Homecoming; Rankings from AP Poll released prior to the game; All times are in Eastern time

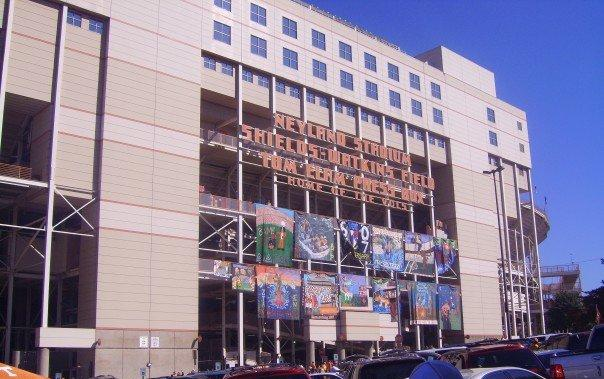
Neyland Stadium was the host for seven Tennessee home games in 2008.

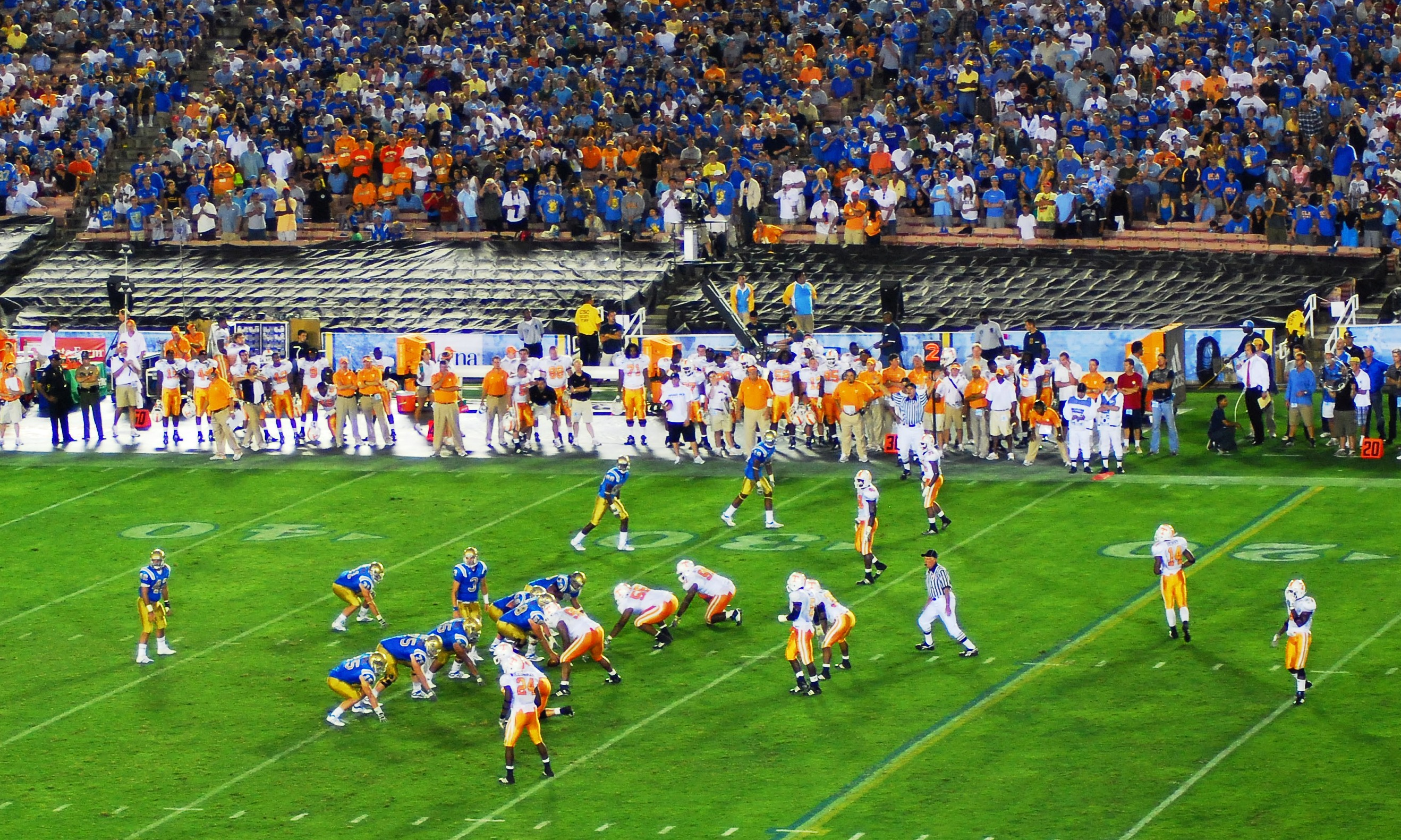
Tennessee on defense vs. UCLA at the Rose Bowl, Sept. 1

== Rankings ==
Ranking movements Legend: ██ Increase in ranking ██ Decrease in ranking — = Not ranked
| | Week | | | | | | | | | | | | | | | |
| Poll | Pre | 1 | 2 | 3 | 4 | 5 | 6 | 7 | 8 | 9 | 10 | 11 | 12 | 13 | 14 | Final |
|---|---|---|---|---|---|---|---|---|---|---|---|---|---|---|---|---|
| AP | 18 | — | — | — | — | — | — | — | — | — | — | — | — | — | — | |
| Coaches | 18 | — | — | — | — | — | — | — | — | — | — | — | — | — | — | |
| Harris | Not released | | | | | — | — | — | — | — | — | — | — | — | — | Not released |
| BCS | Not released | | | | | | | | — | — | — | — | — | — | — | Not released |

== Game summaries ==
=== At UCLA ===
| | 1 | 2 | 3 | 4 | OT | Total |
|---|---|---|---|---|---|---|
| No. 18 Volunteers | 0 | 14 | 0 | 10 | 0 | 24 |
| Bruins | 7 | 0 | 3 | 14 | 3 | 27 |

| Statistics | TENN | UCLA |
|---|---|---|
| First downs | 20 | 20 |
| Total yards | 366 | 288 |
| Rushing yards | 177 | 29 |
| Passing yards | 197 | 268 |
| Turnovers | 2 | 4 |
| Time of possession | 29:51 | 30:09 |

| Team | Category | Player | Statistics |
|---|---|---|---|
| Tennessee | Passing | Jonathan Crompton | 19/41, 189 yards, INT |
| Tennessee | Rushing | Arian Foster | 13 rushes, 96 yards |
| Tennessee | Receiving | Josh Briscoe | 1 reception, 41 yards |
| UCLA | Passing | Kevin Craft | 25/43, 259 yards, TD, 4 INT |
| UCLA | Rushing | Raymond Carter | 15 rushes, 14 yards, TD |
| UCLA | Receiving | Ryan Moya | 7 receptions, 65 yards, TD |

=== UAB ===
| | 1 | 2 | 3 | 4 | Total |
|---|---|---|---|---|---|
| Blazers | 0 | 0 | 3 | 0 | 3 |
| Volunteers | 14 | 0 | 14 | 7 | 35 |

| Statistics | UAB | TENN |
|---|---|---|
| First downs | 14 | 25 |
| Total yards | 275 | 548 |
| Rushing yards | 108 | 266 |
| Passing yards | 174 | 291 |
| Turnovers | 3 | 2 |
| Time of possession | 28:46 | 31:14 |

| Team | Category | Player | Statistics |
|---|---|---|---|
| UAB | Passing | Joe Webb | 19/34, 167 yards, 3 INT |
| UAB | Rushing | Joe Webb | 14 rushes, 78 yards |
| UAB | Receiving | Frantrell Forrest | 8 receptions, 83 yards |
| Tennessee | Passing | Jonathan Crompton | 19/31, 240 yards, 2 TD, 2 INT |
| Tennessee | Rushing | Arian Foster | 12 rushes, 100 yards |
| Tennessee | Receiving | Lucas Taylor | 9 receptions, 132 yards |

=== No. 4 Florida ===
| | 1 | 2 | 3 | 4 | Total |
|---|---|---|---|---|---|
| No. 4 Gators | 17 | 3 | 7 | 3 | 30 |
| Volunteers | 0 | 0 | 0 | 6 | 6 |

| Statistics | FLA | TENN |
|---|---|---|
| First downs | 16 | 16 |
| Total yards | 243 | 258 |
| Rushing yards | 147 | 96 |
| Passing yards | 98 | 162 |
| Turnovers | 0 | 3 |
| Time of possession | 29:58 | 30:02 |

| Team | Category | Player | Statistics |
|---|---|---|---|
| Florida | Passing | Tim Tebow | 8/15, 96 yards, 2 TD |
| Florida | Rushing | Emmanuel Moody | 9 rushes, 55 yards |
| Florida | Receiving | Percy Harvin | 2 receptions, 49 yards, TD |
| Tennessee | Passing | Jonathan Crompton | 18/28, 162 yards, INT |
| Tennessee | Rushing | Arian Foster | 14 rushes, 37 yards |
| Tennessee | Receiving | Gerald Jones | 5 receptions, 40 yards |

=== At No. 15 Auburn ===
| | 1 | 2 | 3 | 4 | Total |
|---|---|---|---|---|---|
| Volunteers | 0 | 6 | 0 | 6 | 12 |
| No. 15 Tigers | 7 | 7 | 0 | 0 | 14 |

| Statistics | TENN | AUB |
|---|---|---|
| First downs | 9 | 15 |
| Total yards | 191 | 226 |
| Rushing yards | 124 | 97 |
| Passing yards | 72 | 139 |
| Turnovers | 1 | 1 |
| Time of possession | 27:15 | 32:45 |

| Team | Category | Player | Statistics |
|---|---|---|---|
| Tennessee | Passing | Jonathan Crompton | 8/23, 67 yards |
| Tennessee | Rushing | Montario Hardesty | 10 rushes, 35 yards, TD |
| Tennessee | Receiving | Austin Rogers | 1 reception, 14 yards |
| Auburn | Passing | Chris Todd | 14/23, 93 yards, TD, INT |
| Auburn | Rushing | Ben Tate | 19 rushes, 70 yards |
| Auburn | Receiving | Robert Dunn | 6 receptions, 54 yards, TD |

=== Northern Illinois ===
| | 1 | 2 | 3 | 4 | Total |
|---|---|---|---|---|---|
| Huskies | 3 | 0 | 6 | 0 | 9 |
| Volunteers | 0 | 3 | 10 | 0 | 13 |

| Statistics | NIU | TENN |
|---|---|---|
| First downs | 12 | 9 |
| Total yards | 190 | 225 |
| Rushing yards | 72 | 69 |
| Passing yards | 128 | 184 |
| Turnovers | 1 | 3 |
| Time of possession | 33:05 | 26:55 |

| Team | Category | Player | Statistics |
|---|---|---|---|
| Northern Illinois | Passing | Dan Nicholson | 10/15, 79 yards, INT |
| Northern Illinois | Rushing | DeMarcus Grady | 14 rushes, 41 yards |
| Northern Illinois | Receiving | Landon Cox | 3 receptions, 36 yards |
| Tennessee | Passing | Nick Stephens | 10/17, 156 yards, TD |
| Tennessee | Rushing | Arian Foster | 18 rushes, 75 yards |
| Tennessee | Receiving | Denarius Moore | 3 receptions, 65 yards, TD |

=== At No. 10 Georgia ===
| | 1 | 2 | 3 | 4 | Total |
|---|---|---|---|---|---|
| Volunteers | 0 | 7 | 7 | 0 | 14 |
| No. 10 Bulldogs | 10 | 10 | 0 | 6 | 26 |

| Statistics | TENN | UGA |
|---|---|---|
| First downs | 10 | 29 |
| Total yards | 209 | 458 |
| Rushing yards | 1 | 148 |
| Passing yards | 208 | 310 |
| Turnovers | 0 | 2 |
| Time of possession | 17:56 | 42:04 |

| Team | Category | Player | Statistics |
|---|---|---|---|
| Tennessee | Passing | Nick Stephens | 13/30, 208 yards, 2 TD |
| Tennessee | Rushing | Montario Hardesty | 6 rushes, 20 yards |
| Tennessee | Receiving | Gerald Jones | 4 receptions, 68 yards, TD |
| Georgia | Passing | Matthew Stafford | 25/36, 310 yards, TD, 2 INT |
| Georgia | Rushing | Knowshon Moreno | 27 rushes, 101 yards |
| Georgia | Receiving | Mohamed Massaquoi | 5 receptions, 103 yards, TD |

=== Mississippi State ===
| | 1 | 2 | 3 | 4 | Total |
|---|---|---|---|---|---|
| Bulldogs | 0 | 3 | 0 | 0 | 3 |
| Volunteers | 0 | 6 | 7 | 21 | 34 |

| Statistics | MSST | TENN |
|---|---|---|
| First downs | 13 | 16 |
| Total yards | 189 | 275 |
| Rushing yards | 69 | 139 |
| Passing yards | 150 | 139 |
| Turnovers | 3 | 0 |
| Time of possession | 30:55 | 29:05 |

| Team | Category | Player | Statistics |
|---|---|---|---|
| Mississippi State | Passing | Tyson Lee | 12/23, 114 yards, 3 INT |
| Mississippi State | Rushing | Boobie Dixon | 15 rushes, 46 yards |
| Mississippi State | Receiving | Brandon McRae | 2 receptions, 28 yards |
| Tennessee | Passing | Nick Stephens | 10/20, 136 yards |
| Tennessee | Rushing | Lennon Creer | 17 rushes, 68 yards, TD |
| Tennessee | Receiving | Denarius Moore | 1 reception, 45 yards |

=== No. 2 Alabama ===
| | 1 | 2 | 3 | 4 | Total |
|---|---|---|---|---|---|
| No. 2 Crimson Tide | 6 | 7 | 9 | 7 | 29 |
| Volunteers | 3 | 0 | 0 | 6 | 9 |

| Statistics | ALA | TENN |
|---|---|---|
| First downs | 23 | 10 |
| Total yards | 366 | 173 |
| Rushing yards | 178 | 36 |
| Passing yards | 188 | 137 |
| Turnovers | 1 | 0 |
| Time of possession | 35:32 | 24:28 |

| Team | Category | Player | Statistics |
|---|---|---|---|
| Alabama | Passing | John Parker Wilson | 17/24, 188 yards |
| Alabama | Rushing | Roy Upchurch | 14 rushes, 86 yards, TD |
| Alabama | Receiving | Julio Jones | 6 receptions, 103 yards |
| Tennessee | Passing | Nick Stephens | 16/28, 137 yards, TD |
| Tennessee | Rushing | Arian Foster | 6 rushes, 21 yards |
| Tennessee | Receiving | Josh Briscoe | 4 receptions, 46 yards, TD |

=== At South Carolina ===
| | 1 | 2 | 3 | 4 | Total |
|---|---|---|---|---|---|
| Volunteers | 0 | 0 | 6 | 0 | 6 |
| Gamecocks | 7 | 14 | 3 | 3 | 27 |

| Statistics | TENN | SCAR |
|---|---|---|
| First downs | 11 | 11 |
| Total yards | 207 | 255 |
| Rushing yards | 34 | 101 |
| Passing yards | 173 | 154 |
| Turnovers | 3 | 1 |
| Time of possession | 27:30 | 32:30 |

| Team | Category | Player | Statistics |
|---|---|---|---|
| Tennessee | Passing | Nick Stephens | 10/24, 134 yards, INT |
| Tennessee | Rushing | Arian Foster | 14 rushes, 56 yards, TD |
| Tennessee | Receiving | Austin Rogers | 3 receptions, 72 yards |
| South Carolina | Passing | Stephen Garcia | 9/19, 139 yards, TD, INT |
| South Carolina | Rushing | Mike Davis | 26 rushes, 58 yards |
| South Carolina | Receiving | Kenny McKinley | 4 receptions, 50 yards, TD |

=== Wyoming ===
| | 1 | 2 | 3 | 4 | Total |
|---|---|---|---|---|---|
| Cowboys | 7 | 6 | 0 | 0 | 13 |
| Volunteers | 0 | 0 | 7 | 0 | 7 |

| Statistics | WYO | TENN |
|---|---|---|
| First downs | 15 | 15 |
| Total yards | 266 | 219 |
| Rushing yards | 167 | 101 |
| Passing yards | 99 | 118 |
| Turnovers | 1 | 2 |
| Time of possession | 31:03 | 28:47 |

| Team | Category | Player | Statistics |
|---|---|---|---|
| Wyoming | Passing | Chris Stutzriem | 8/16, 95 yards, TD |
| Wyoming | Rushing | Devin Moore | 32 rushes, 98 yards |
| Wyoming | Receiving | Chris Johnson | 1 reception, 26 yards |
| Tennessee | Passing | Jonathan Crompton | 11/27, 91 yards, TD |
| Tennessee | Rushing | Lennon Creer | 16 rushes, 82 yards |
| Tennessee | Receiving | Gerald Jones | 5 receptions, 37 yards, TD |

=== At Vanderbilt ===
| | 1 | 2 | 3 | 4 | Total |
|---|---|---|---|---|---|
| Volunteers | 0 | 20 | 0 | 0 | 20 |
| Commodores | 0 | 0 | 10 | 0 | 10 |

| Statistics | TENN | VAN |
|---|---|---|
| First downs | 15 | 16 |
| Total yards | 243 | 213 |
| Rushing yards | 222 | 25 |
| Passing yards | 21 | 188 |
| Turnovers | 3 | 3 |
| Time of possession | 35:14 | 24:46 |

| Team | Category | Player | Statistics |
|---|---|---|---|
| Tennessee | Passing | B. J. Coleman | 4/8, 21 yards, INT |
| Tennessee | Rushing | Lennon Creer | 13 rushes, 80 yards |
| Tennessee | Receiving | Austin Rogers | 1 reception, 7 yards |
| Vanderbilt | Passing | Mackenzi Adams | 18/38, 192 yards, INT |
| Vanderbilt | Rushing | Jeff Jennings | 7 rushes, 19 yards |
| Vanderbilt | Receiving | George Smith | 5 receptions, 46 yards |

=== Kentucky ===
| | 1 | 2 | 3 | 4 | Total |
|---|---|---|---|---|---|
| Wildcats | 3 | 0 | 0 | 7 | 10 |
| Volunteers | 0 | 7 | 7 | 14 | 28 |

| Statistics | UK | TENN |
|---|---|---|
| First downs | 11 | 16 |
| Total yards | 193 | 311 |
| Rushing yards | 96 | 210 |
| Passing yards | 97 | 101 |
| Turnovers | 0 | 0 |
| Time of possession | 25:42 | 34:18 |

| Team | Category | Player | Statistics |
|---|---|---|---|
| Kentucky | Passing | Mike Hartline | 5/7, 74 yards |
| Kentucky | Rushing | Tony Dixon | 15 rushes, 48 yards |
| Kentucky | Receiving | E. J. Adams | 1 reception, 35 yards |
| Tennessee | Passing | Jonathan Crompton | 6/8, 101 yards, TD |
| Tennessee | Rushing | Gerald Jones | 1 rush, 63 yards, TD |
| Tennessee | Receiving | Denarius Moore | 1 reception, 63 yards, TD |

== Players ==
=== Starting lineups and coaches ===
Head coach: Phillip Fulmer

==== Offense ====
Offensive Coordinator / Quarterbacks: Dave Clawson
Offensive Scheme: Multiple

Wide Receivers: Latrell Scott
Offensive Line: Greg Atkins
Running Backs: Ronald Gallant Jr.
Tight Ends: Jason Michael

==== Offensive outlook ====
Coaches
Head coach Phillip Fulmer hired Dave Clawson, formerly the head coach at the University of Richmond, to replace David Cutcliffe as offensive coordinator. Greg Atkins (offensive line) is the only returning coach on the offensive staff. Joining him are newly hired assistants Stan Drayton (running backs), Jason Michael, and Latrell Scott (wide receivers).

Quarterbacks
The Vols must replace graduate Erik Ainge, a 5th-round selection of the New York Jets in the 2008 NFL draft. The leading candidates are Jonathan Crompton, who started one game as an injury replacement for Ainge in 2006, redshirt freshman B. J. Coleman and redshirt sophomore Nick Stephens. After spring practices, Crompton had minor elbow surgery but should be ready for the season opener and all reports are that Crompton will be the starting quarterback.

Running backs

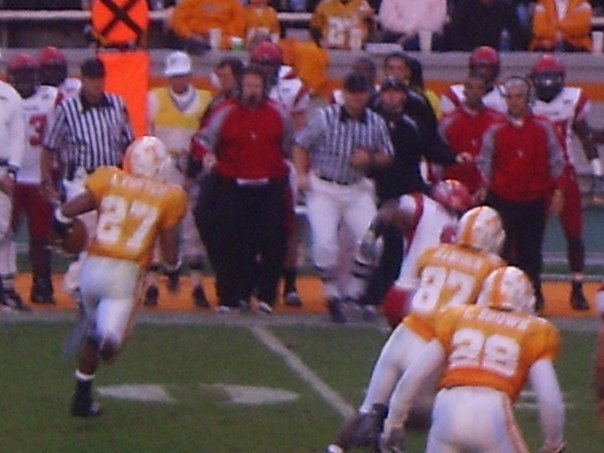
Arian Foster leads a talented group of returning tailbacks.

Arian Foster saw the majority of time at tailback last season, with relief appearances by LaMarcus Coker, Montario Hardesty, and Lennon Creer. Coker was eventually dismissed from the team following the South Carolina game for a violation of team rules. Foster finished the season with 1193 rushing yards and 12 TDs. Foster, Hardesty and Creer all return and look to see significant time in the backfield. Looking to work his way into the rotation will be Daryl Vereen, a highly touted redshirt freshman. The fullback position may also be used more under Clawson. The starter was supposed to be David Holbert, but he has suffered another ACL injury and is out for the year. To honor Holbert, Arian Foster will wear Holbert's #30 jersey in the season opener at UCLA. With the injury to Holbert, sophomore Kevin Cooper looks to be the starter but true freshman Austin Johnson, who just recently moved from linebacker to fullback, will also compete for playing time. Receivers

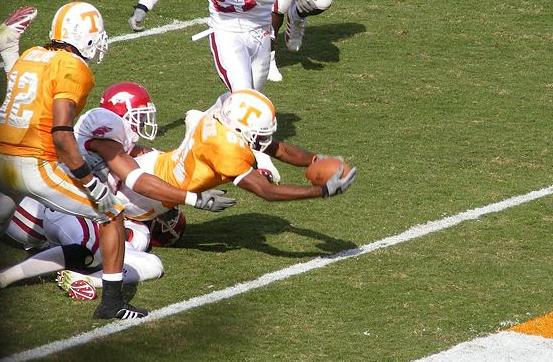
Josh Briscoe and two other seniors will lead the Vols receiving corp in 2008.

The wide receivers were led by Lucas Taylor and Austin Rogers last season. Taylor had 73 receptions for 1,000 yards, while Rogers caught 56 passes for 624 yards. Both return for their senior season in 2008. Joining them will be Senior Josh Briscoe, Junior Quintin Hancock, Sophomores Gerald Jones, who many said was the star of the spring and will also see time at quarterback, Denarius Moore, and redshirt freshman Ahmad Paige.

Offensive line
The offensive line returns the entire starting group from late in the 2007 season. The line was shuffled after an injury to Eric Young. Josh McNeil will anchor the line at center, with guards Anthony Parker and Jacques McClendon. Ramon Foster and Chris Scott will be the starters at tackle. This line allowed only 4 sacks during the 2007 season. Many experts predict Anthony Parker to be a First team All-American and for this unit to be the strongest in the SEC.

Tight ends
The tight end position is up in the air following the losses of Chris Brown and Brad Cottam. Brad's brother Jeff Cottam and Luke Stocker are the leading candidates for the starting job. Because of the depth issues at tight end, offensive lineman Cody Pope was moved to play the position

Current starters (as of October 6, 2008)

| Position | Number | Name | Height | Weight | Class | Hometown | Games↑ |
|---|---|---|---|---|---|---|---|
| QB | 17 | Nick Stephens | 6'4" | 215 lb. | Soph. | Flower Mound, Texas | 1 |
| TB | 27 | * Arian Foster | 6'1" | 225 lb. | RS-Sr. | San Diego, California | 5 |
| TE | 88 | Luke Stocker | 6'6" | 245 lb. | Soph. | Berea, Kentucky | 0 |
| WR | 12 | * Lucas Taylor | 6'0" | 185 lb. | Sr. | Carencro, Louisiana | 0 |
| WR | 4 | Gerald Jones | 6'0" | 180 lb. | Soph. | Oklahoma City, Oklahoma | 0 |
| WR | 81 | * Josh Briscoe | 6'3" | 183 lb. | Sr. | Lawndale, North Carolina | 0 |
| LT | 78 | * Ramon Foster | 6'6" | 325 lb. | Sr. | Henning, Tennessee | 0 |
| LG | 75 | * Anthony Parker | 6'3" | 305 lb. | RS-Sr. | Jonesboro, Georgia | 0 |
| C | 50 | * Josh McNeil | 6'4" | 280 lb. | RS-Jr. | Collins, Mississippi | 0 |
| RG | 65 | * Jacques McClendon | 6'3" | 330 lb. | RS-Jr. | Cleveland, Tennessee | 0 |
| RT | 79 | * Chris Scott | 6'5" | 325 lb. | So. | Lovejoy, Georgia | 0 |

- * – Denotes returning starter.
- ↑ – Denotes number of games started by the player at the listed position during the 2008 season.

==== Defense ====
Defensive coordinator / linebackers / associate head coach: John Chavis (20th year)
Base Defense: Multiple (4–3 and 3–2–6 "Mustang")

Defensive line: Dan Brooks
Defensive ends: Steve Caldwell
Defensive backs: Larry Slade

Position outlook

Coaches
2008 will be the 14th season as defensive coordinator for John Chavis. The defensive staff had been together and unchanged since the 1999 season, with Dan Brooks, Steve Caldwell and Larry Slade.

Defensive line

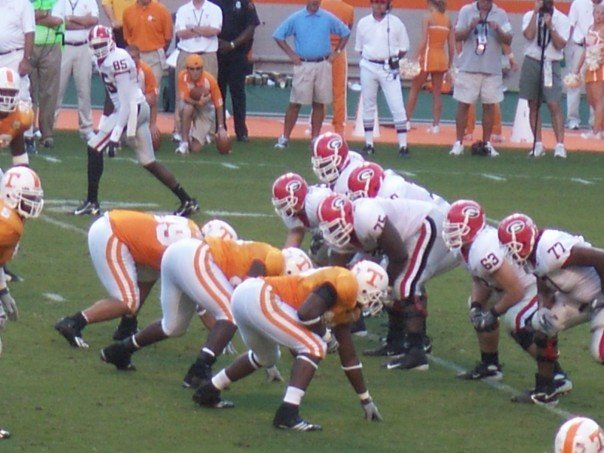
Tennessee must replace two starters at defensive end in 2008.

On the defensive line, the Vols must replace two starters at end. Senior Robert Ayers and Junior Wes Brown are the leading candidates at those two spots. Tackles Dan Williams and DeMonte Bolden return after starting for the majority of the 2007 season. Providing depth will be tackles Walter Fisher, Chase Nelson, Donald Langley and Victor Thomas along with ends Ben Martin, Andre Mathis, and Chris Walker.

Linebackers
The Vols replace two starters in the linebacker corps. Junior Rico McCoy returns to man one of the outside spots. Ellix Wilson, who started the 2008 Outback Bowl at the middle linebacker looks to earn that job for the 2008 season. The other outside spot is up in the air, with Nevin McKenzie seeing the most time there the previous year.

Defensive backs
The defensive backfield saw a slew of injuries and changes in 2007, but looks to be much more stable and seasoned in 2008. The Vols must replace departing safety Jonathan Hefney. Sophomores Eric Berry (SS), Brent Vinson and DeAngelo Willingham (Cornerbacks) should return to their spots with special teams phenom, Dennis Rogan expected to see plenty of snaps at both cornerback and safety. SS Demetrice Morley was reinstated in school after academic trouble caused him to miss the 2007 season. He is the leading candidate at the vacant free safety spot. It has also been stated during the off season that Eric Berry could see time on the offensive side of the ball, as he has lined up at quarterback multiple times during spring practice.

Projected starters (Note: Does not include incoming freshmen).

| Position | Number | Name | Height | Weight | Class | Hometown | Games↑ |
|---|---|---|---|---|---|---|---|
| LE | 91 | Robert Ayers | 6'3" | 260 lb. | RS-Sr. | Clio, South Carolina | 0 |
| LT | 55 | * Dan Williams | 6'2" | 310 lb. | RS-Jr. | Memphis, Tennessee | 0 |
| RT | 98 | * Demonté Bolden | 6'6" | 290 lb. | Sr. | Chattanooga, Tennessee | 0 |
| RE | 94 | Wes Brown | 6'3" | 270 lb. | RS-Jr. | Athens, Alabama | 0 |
| SLB | 20 | Nevin McKenzie | 6'2" | 210 lb. | Sr. | San Antonio, Texas | 0 |
| MLB | 35 | Ellix Wilson | 5'10" | 225 lb. | RS-Jr. | Memphis, Tennessee | 0 |
| WLB | 5 | * Rico McCoy | 6'1" | 215 lb. | Jr. | Washington, D.C. | 0 |
| RCB | 24 | * DeAngelo Willingham | 6'0" | 200 lb. | Sr. | Palm Desert, CA | 0 |
| LCB | 13 | * Brent Vinson | 6'2" | 180 lb. | So. | Hampton, Virginia | 0 |
| FS | 7 | Demetrice Morley | 6'2" | 195 lb. | RS-Jr. | Miami, Florida | 0 |
| SS | 14 | * Eric Berry | 5'11" | 195 lb. | So. | Fairburn, Georgia | 0 |

- * – Denotes returning starter
- ↑ – Denotes number of games started by the player at the listed position during the 2008 season.

==== Special teams ====
Position outlook
Sophomore Daniel Lincoln (kicker) replaced departing Senior James Wilhoit in 2007 and earned All American Honors. Britton Colquitt returns as punter and will handle kickoffs. Sophomores Dennis Rogan emerged as the main kick and punt returner last, with Lennon Creer joining him as kick returner. Both players return.

Projected starters (Note: Does not include incoming Freshmen).

| Position | Number | Name | Height | Weight | Class | Hometown | Games↑ |
|---|---|---|---|---|---|---|---|
| P | 95 | Chad Cunningham ‡ | 6'3" | 210 lb. | RS-So. | Dawsonville, Georgia | 0 |
| P | 47 | * Britton Colquitt ‡ | 6'3" | 205 lb. | RS-Sr. | Knoxville, Tennessee | 0 |
| PR | 41 | * Dennis Rogan | 5'10" | 175 lb. | So. | Knoxville, Tennessee | 0 |
| KO | 26 | * Daniel Lincoln | 6'0" | 204 lb. | So. | Ocala, Florida | 0 |
| KR | 41 | * Dennis Rogan | 5'10" | 175 lb. | So. | Knoxville, Tennessee | 0 |
| KR | 3 | * Lennon Creer | 6'1" | 202 lb. | So. | Tatum, Texas | 0 |
| PK | 26 | * Daniel Lincoln | 6'0" | 204 lb. | So. | Ocala, Florida | 0 |

- * – Denotes returning starter
- ↑ – Denotes number of games started by the player at the listed position during the 2008 season.
- ‡ – Note: Cunningham will be the starter during Colquitt's suspension.

== Team players drafted into the NFL ==
| Player | Position | Round | Pick | NFL club |
|---|---|---|---|---|
| Robert Ayers | Defensive end | 1 | 18 | Denver Broncos |
