= 2008 Stanford Cardinal football team =

American college football season

2008 Stanford Cardinal football
- Conference: Pacific-10 Conference
- Record: 5–7 (4–5 Pac-10)
- Head coach: Jim Harbaugh (2nd season)
- Offensive coordinator: David Shaw (2nd season)
- Offensive scheme: Pro-style
- Co-defensive coordinators: Andy Buh (1st season); Ron Lynn (1st season)
- Base defense: 4–3
- Home stadium: Stanford Stadium

Uniform

2008 Pacific-10 Conference football standings
	Conf.			Overall
Team	W		L	W		L
No. 3 USC $	8	–	1	12	–	1
No. 10 Oregon	7	–	2	10	–	3
No. 18 Oregon State	7	–	2	9	–	4
California	6	–	3	9	–	4
Arizona	5	–	4	8	–	5
Arizona State	4	–	5	5	–	7
Stanford	4	–	5	5	–	7
UCLA	3	–	6	4	–	8
Washington State	1	–	8	2	–	11
Washington	0	–	9	0	–	12
$ – Conference champion; Rankings from AP Poll

The 2008 Stanford Cardinal football team represented Stanford University in the 2008 NCAA Division I FBS football season. The team's head coach was Jim Harbaugh, who entered his second year at Stanford. The team played their home games at Stanford Stadium in Stanford, California and competed in the Pacific-10 Conference. The Cardinal improved on their 4–8 record from the 2007 season by going 5–7. After winning back the Stanford Axe from rival California in 2007 for the first time in five years, Stanford lost the Axe to Cal in the 2008 Big Game.

== Schedule ==
Date	Time	Opponent	Site	TV	Result	Attendance
August 28	6:00 p.m.	Oregon State	Stanford Stadium; Stanford, CA	ESPN2	W 36–28	30,223
September 6	7:00 p.m.	at No. 15 Arizona State	Sun Devil Stadium; Tempe, AZ		L 17–41	59,441
September 13	10:00 a.m.	at TCU*	Amon G. Carter Stadium; Fort Worth, TX	The Mtn.	L 14–31	25,531
September 20	6:00 p.m.	San Jose State*	Stanford Stadium; Stanford, CA (Bill Walsh Legacy Game)		W 23–10	33,293
September 27	7:00 p.m.	at Washington	Husky Stadium; Seattle, WA		W 35–28	61,968
October 4	11:30 a.m.	at Notre Dame*	Notre Dame Stadium; Notre Dame, IN (Legends Trophy)	NBC	L 21–28	80,795
October 11	2:00 p.m.	Arizona^{†}	Stanford Stadium; Stanford, CA		W 24–23	30,689
October 18	1:00 p.m.	at UCLA	Rose Bowl; Pasadena, CA (rivalry)	CSNBA	L 20–23	64,883
November 1	2:00 p.m.	Washington State	Stanford Stadium; Stanford, CA		W 58–0	26,662
November 8	12:30 p.m.	at Oregon	Autzen Stadium; Eugene, OR (rivalry)	FSN	L 28–35	58,013
November 15	4:00 p.m.	No. 6 USC	Stanford Stadium; Stanford, CA (rivalry)	Versus	L 23–45	50,425
November 22	12:30 p.m.	at California	California Memorial Stadium; Berkeley, CA (111th Big Game)	ABC	L 16–37	70,089
*Non-conference game; ^{†}Homecoming; Rankings from AP Poll released prior to the game; All times are in Pacific time

Schedule source: 2008 Stanford Cardinal football schedule

== Coaches ==
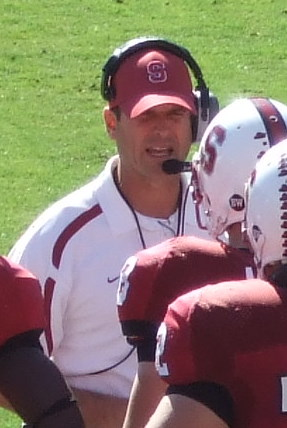
Second-Year Head Coach Jim Harbaugh

Name	Position	Year at Stanford	Alma mater (year)
Jim Harbaugh	Head coach	2nd	Michigan (1986)
Ron Lynn	Co-defensive coordinator/assistant head coach	1st	Mount Union (1966)
David Shaw	Offensive coordinator/wide receivers	2nd	Stanford (1995)
Lance Anderson	Defensive tackles/recruiting coordinator	2nd	Idaho State (1996)
Andy Buh	Co – Defensive coordinator/Linebackers	2nd	Nevada (1996)
Chris Dalman	Offensive line	2nd	Stanford (1992)
Tim Drevno	Tight ends	2nd	Cal State Fullerton (1992)
D. J. Durkin	Defensive ends/special teams	2nd	Bowling Green (2001)
Willie Taggart	Running backs	2nd	Western Kentucky (1998)
Clayton White	Defensive backs	2nd	North Carolina State (2001)
Shannon Turley	Strength and conditioning	2nd	Virginia Tech (2000)
Coleman Hutzler	Defensive analyst	2nd	Middlebury College (2006)

== Game summaries ==
=== Oregon State ===
	1	2	3	4	Total
Oregon State	0	17	3	8	28
Stanford	0	17	5	14	36

=== Arizona State ===
	1	2	3	4	Total
Stanford	7	3	7	0	17
Arizona State	3	17	7	14	41

=== TCU ===
	1	2	3	4	Total
Stanford	0	14	0	0	14
TCU	7	7	7	10	31

=== San Jose State ===
	1	2	3	4	Total
San Jose State	3	7	0	0	10
Stanford	0	7	6	10	23

=== Washington ===
	1	2	3	4	Total
Stanford	7	14	7	7	35
Washington	7	7	7	7	28

=== Notre Dame ===
	1	2	3	4	Total
Stanford	0	7	0	14	21
Notre Dame	7	14	7	0	28

=== Arizona ===
	1	2	3	4	Total
Arizona	3	14	0	6	23
Stanford	7	14	7	7	35

=== UCLA ===
	1	2	3	4	Total
Stanford	7	7	0	6	20
UCLA	0	6	7	10	23

The week before, the Cardinal beat Arizona 24–23 in an exciting conference game, while the Bruins lost a close game to the Ducks. UCLA had a record of 44–31–3 on the Cardinal before game time.

With ten seconds left in this UCLA's homecoming game and the Bruins behind by four points, Bruin quarterback Kevin Craft passed to freshman Cory Harkey for a 7-yard touchdown to win the game, 23–20, over the Stanford Cardinal in the northeast corner of the Rose Bowl Saturday afternoon. Two turnovers by the Bruins led to the 14 Stanford points in the first half.

In the game, Craft had 285 passing yards and Taylor Embree caught 72 yards, while Stanford's Toby Gerhart rushed for 138 yards.

=== Washington State ===
	1	2	3	4	Total
Washington State	0	0	0	0	0
Stanford	10	21	20	7	58

=== Oregon ===
	1	2	3	4	Total
Stanford	3	14	3	8	28
Oregon	17	3	7	8	35

=== USC ===
	1	2	3	4	Total
USC	3	14	7	21	45
Stanford	10	7	0	6	23

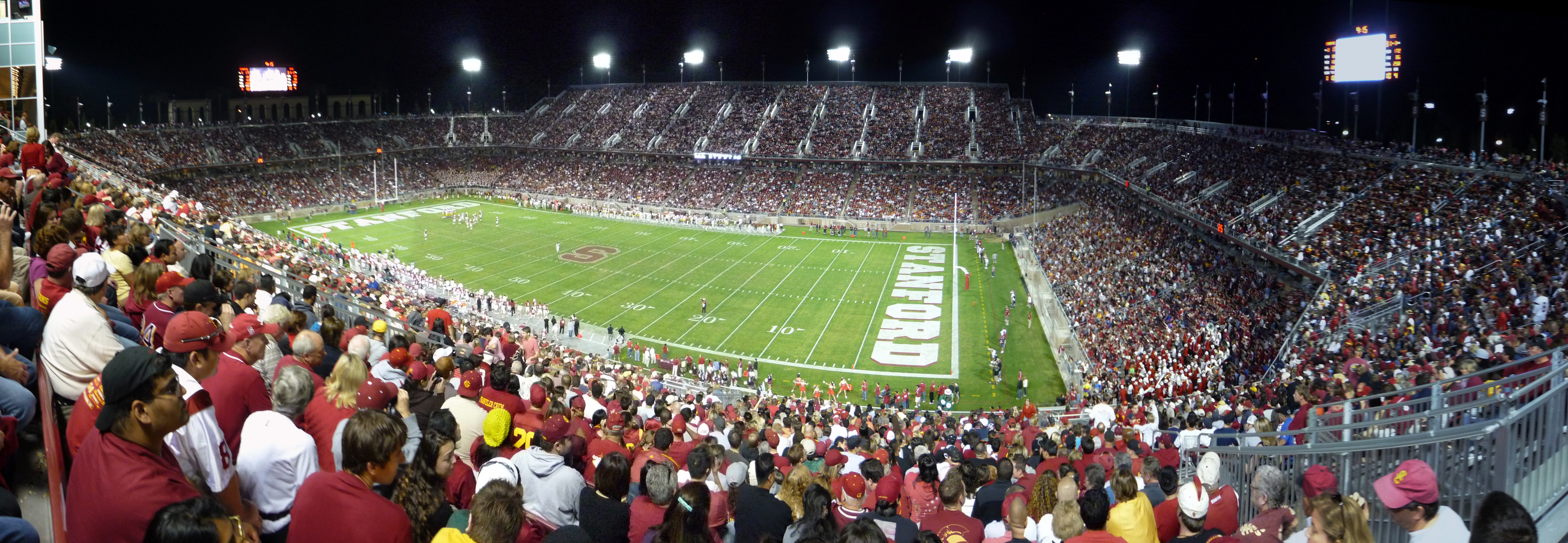
The game marked the first sell out of the new Stanford Stadium since its opening in 2006.

=== California ===
	1	2	3	4	Total
Stanford	0	3	0	13	16
California	3	7	20	7	37

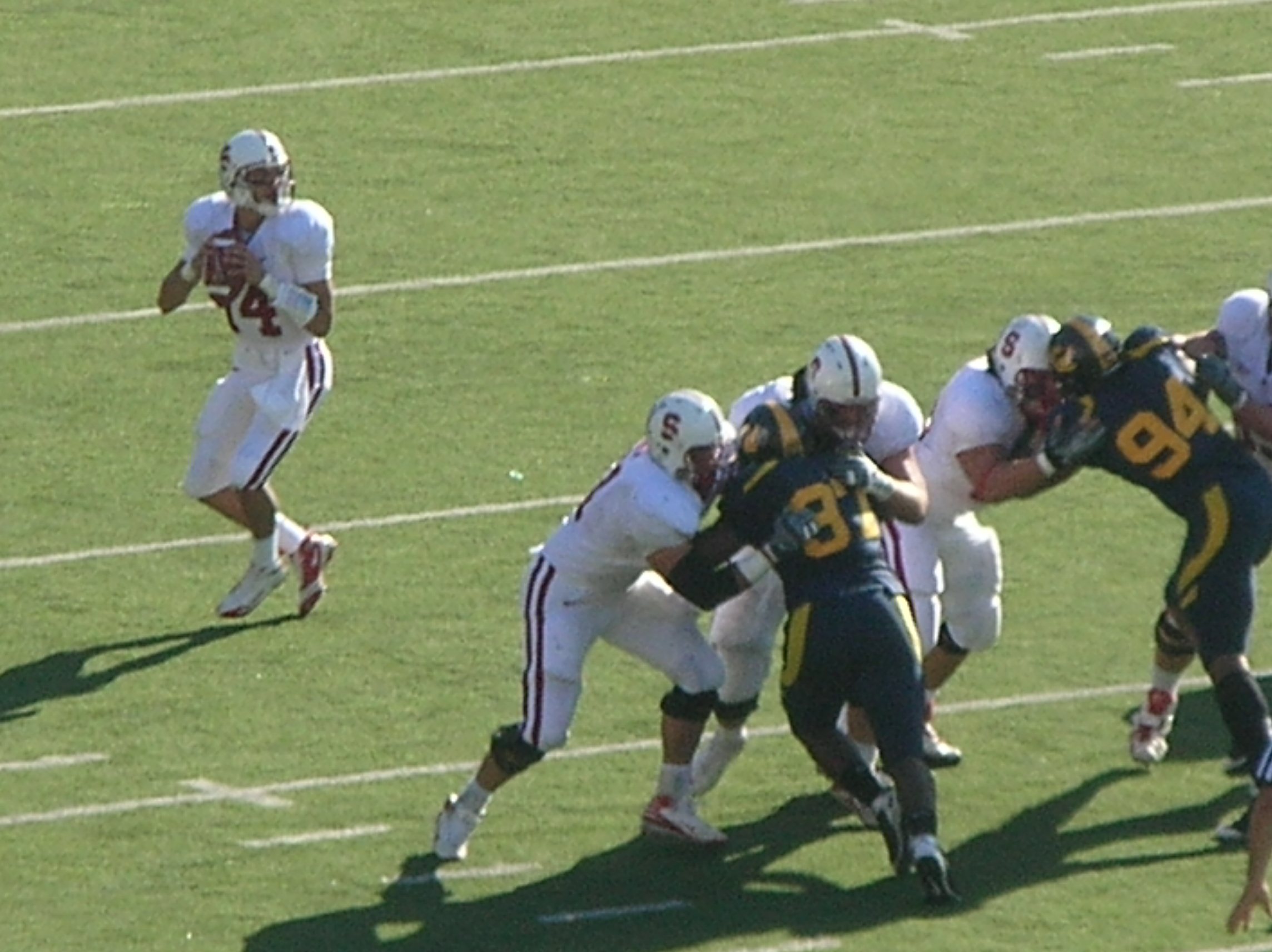
Pritchard looks to pass

The Cardinal traveled up to Berkeley in an attempt to hold on to the Axe and earn a bowl berth with a sixth win. The Bears led 10–3 at the half and ran up 20 unanswered points in the third quarter. Stanford was able to score two quick back to back touchdowns in the fourth quarter but could not close a 21–point deficit. Tavita Pritchard threw for 306 yards and a score while Toby Gerhart rushed for 103 yards and a score. Although the loss relinquished the Axe to Cal and prevented Stanford from becoming bowl eligible, Harbaugh set the standards even higher for 2009 by declaring that "Bowl Championship Series eligible is what we’re aiming for."
