= Kevin Craft =

American football player (born 1985)

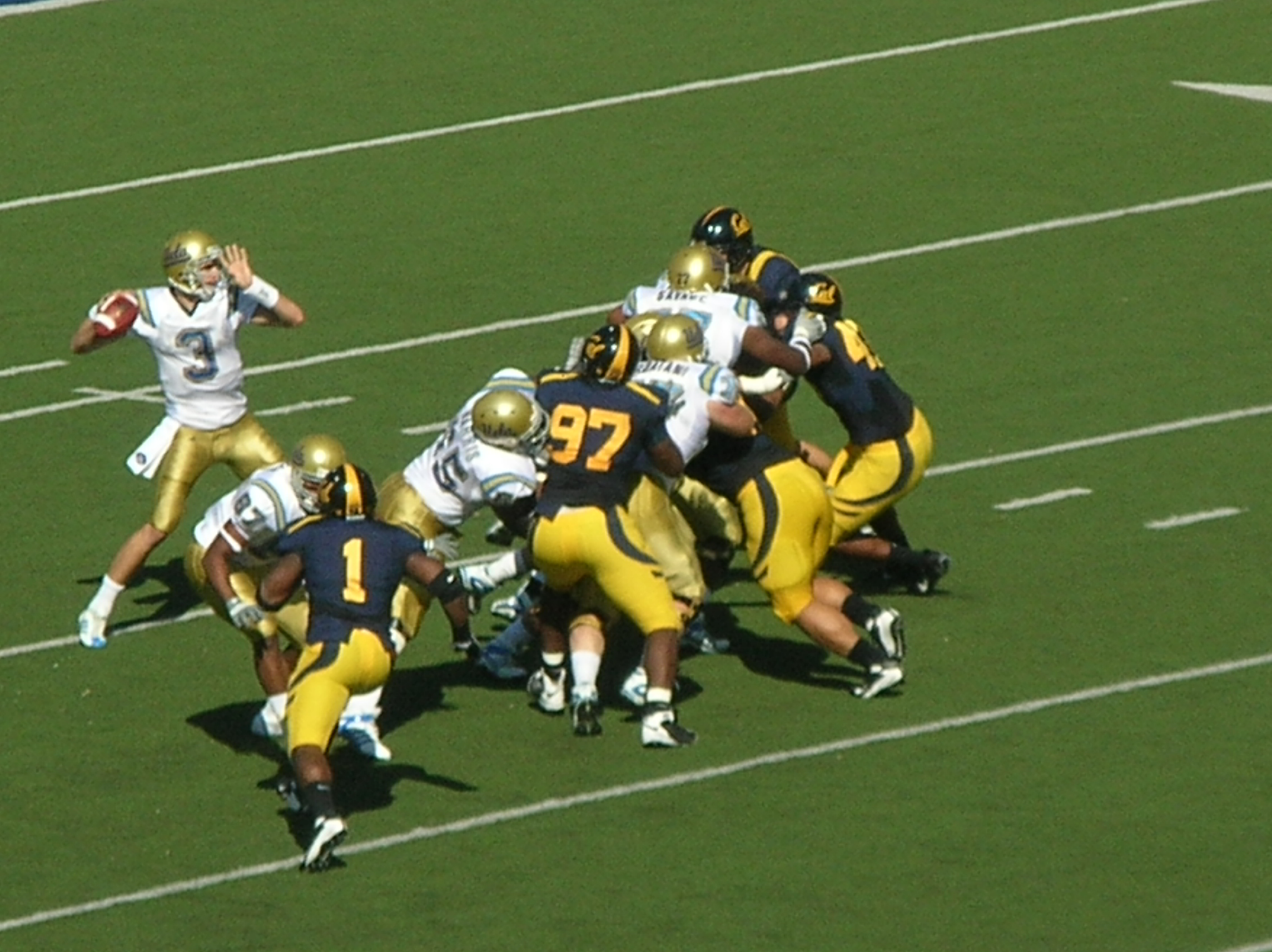
- Craft (#3) passes during an October 2008 game against the California Golden Bears

Profile
- Position: Quarterback

Personal information
- Born: October 15, 1985 (age 41); Escondido, California, U.S.
- Listed height: 6 ft 4 in (1.93 m)
- Listed weight: 195 lb (88 kg)

Career information
- High school: Valley Center (Valley Center, California)
- College: San Diego State (2004–2006); Mt. SAC (2007); UCLA (2008–2009)
- NFL draft: 2010: undrafted

Career history
- Cougars de Saint-Ouen-l'Aumône (2010–2011); IBM Big Blue (2012–2023)

Awards and highlights
- 2009 EagleBank Bowl champion; All-Rookie Selection Japanese X-League (2012); All-X-League Team (2012-2013)

Kevin Craft (born October 15, 1985) is an American football coach and former player. He is the head football coach at Riverside City College in Riverside, California. Craft played college football as a quarterback at San Diego State University, Mt. San Antonio College, and the University of California, Los Angeles (UCLA).

== Early life ==
Craft attended Valley Center High School in Valley Center, California and was an excellent student and a letterman in football, basketball, and track. In football, he was a three-year letterman and earned All-California Interscholatic Federation honors. He graduated from Valley Center High School in 2004.

== College career ==
=== San Diego State ===
Craft originally attended San Diego State University, where his father, former San Diego State Aztecs quarterback Tom Craft, was head football coach. Arriving in 2005, Craft redshirted his first year; his father was fired at the end of the season and replaced by Chuck Long. Craft remained and, as a redshirt freshman, appeared in nine games and started five as the Aztecs went on to a 3–9 record in 2006; he had a 109.8 passer rating. In his first career start at San Diego State, Craft completed 20 of 32 passes for 216 yards against BYU.

=== Mt. SAC ===
Craft transferred from SDSU after the season and played football at Mt. San Antonio College (Mt. SAC) in Walnut, California during the 2007 season; again for his father, Tom, who became the offensive coordinator at Mt. SAC.

=== UCLA ===
Craft transferred to UCLA in time for the 2008 spring practices. He became starting quarterback for the UCLA Bruins after the two veteran starters, Ben Olson and Patrick Cowan, both fell to extended injuries. In the Bruins 2008 season opener, Craft led the Bruins to a 27–24 victory against 18th-ranked Tennessee in overtime. After throwing four interceptions in the first half, he came back to complete 18 of 25 passes for 193 yards and 1 touchdown in the second half.

The Bruins finished the season with a record of 4–8 (3–6 Pac-10) and failed to participate in a post-season bowl game. He competed with Kevin Prince and freshman Richard Brehaut for the quarterback position in 2009.

In the 2009 Washington game at the Rose Bowl, Craft came in after Kevin Prince went out to guide the Bruins to a one-point victory, 24–23, and an end to the team's five straight Pac-10 conference losses. He had 10 of 14 completions for 159 yards with an interception.

== Professional career ==
=== Cougars de Saint-Ouen-l'Aumône ===
In 2010, Kevin signed with the Cougars de Saint-Ouen l'Aumône, France. The Cougars play in the highest level of competition in France Ligue Élite de Football Américain and in the EFAF Cup. Every team in the French national championship is eligible to sign two American players. Kevin decided to choose this challenge over his coaching job in order to try to help the Cougars to reach the national title. Craft chose the Cougars despite a late offer from the CFL Calgary Stampeders.

During the 2010 season, Kevin completed 216 of 398 passes for 2,851 yards, 28 touchdowns and 13 interceptions. He rushed for 245 yards and scored 4 touchdowns. The Cougars reached the playoff in both seasons without reaching the championship game.

=== IBM Big Blue ===
In 2012, Kevin played for IBM Big Blue in Japanese X-league. He was an all league selection and a rookie of the year for the central division.

Craft passed for 199 yards in a May 31, 2014 game.

=== Statistics ===
==== Regular season ====
| Year | Team | G | GS | W - L | Passing | | | | | | | | Rushing | | | | Sacked | | Fumbles | |
| Year | Team | G | GS | W - L | Comp | Att | Pct | Yds | Y/A | TD | Int | Rtg | Att | Yds | Avg | TD | Sack | Yds | Fum | Lost |
|---|---|---|---|---|---|---|---|---|---|---|---|---|---|---|---|---|---|---|---|---|
| 2012 | IBM | 5 | 5 | 3–2 | 130 | 176 | 73.9 | 1,628 | 9.3 | 20 | 3 | | 31 | 105 | 3.4 | 1 | 5 | 37 | 4 | 4 |
| 2013 | IBM | 7 | 7 | 5–2 | 117 | 176 | 66.5 | 1,735 | 9.9 | 23 | 4 | | 23 | 161 | 7.0 | 1 | 2 | 13 | 5 | 5 |
| 2014 | IBM | 8 | 8 | 6–2 | 149 | 231 | 64.5 | 1,969 | 8.5 | 23 | 9 | | 27 | 140 | 5.2 | 0 | 6 | 41 | 3 | 2 |
| 2015 | IBM | 6 | 6 | 4–2 | 60 | 95 | 63.2 | 823 | 8.7 | 8 | 3 | | 22 | -55 | -2.5 | 0 | 6 | 55 | 1 | 1 |
| | Total | 26 | 26 | 18–8 | 456 | 678 | 67.3 | 6,155 | 9.1 | 74 | 19 | | 103 | 351 | 3.4 | 2 | 19 | 146 | 13 | 12 |

==== Postseason ====
| Year | Team | G | GS | W - L | Passing | | | | | | | | Rushing | | | | Sacked | | Fumbles | |
| Year | Team | G | GS | W - L | Comp | Att | Pct | Yds | Y/A | TD | Int | Rtg | Att | Yds | Avg | TD | Sack | Yds | Fum | Lost |
|---|---|---|---|---|---|---|---|---|---|---|---|---|---|---|---|---|---|---|---|---|
| 2012 | IBM | 2 | 2 | 1–1 | 31 | 48 | 64.6 | 327 | 6.8 | 5 | 0 | | 15 | 87 | 5.8 | 1 | 1 | 11 | 1 | 1 |
| 2013 | IBM | 2 | 2 | 1–1 | 57 | 79 | 72.2 | 709 | 9.0 | 7 | 1 | | 20 | 110 | 5.5 | 1 | 1 | 2 | 4 | 2 |
| 2014 | IBM | 4 | 4 | 3–1 | 102 | 159 | 64.2 | 1,456 | 9.2 | 17 | 8 | | 31 | 123 | 4.0 | 2 | 4 | 29 | 5 | 4 |
| 2015 | IBM | 2 | 2 | 1–1 | 57 | 85 | 67.1 | 641 | 7.5 | 6 | 3 | | 12 | -19 | -1.6 | 0 | 5 | 37 | 0 | 0 |
| | Total | 10 | 10 | 6–4 | 247 | 371 | 66.6 | 3,133 | 8.4 | 35 | 12 | | 78 | 301 | 3.9 | 4 | 11 | 79 | 10 | 7 |

== Head coaching record ==
| Year | Team | Overall | Conference | Standing | Bowl/playoffs |
|---|---|---|---|---|---|
Riverside City Tigers (National Southern League) (2025–present)
| 2025 | Riverside City | 7–4 | 5–2 | 3rd | L Southern California Bowl |
| Riverside City: | | 7–4 | 5–2 | | |
| Total: | | 7–4 | | | |
