= 2008 UCLA Bruins football team =

American college football season

2008 UCLA Bruins football
- Conference: Pacific-10 Conference
- Record: 4–8 (3–6 Pac-10)
- Head coach: Rick Neuheisel (1st season)
- Offensive coordinator: Norm Chow (1st season)
- Offensive scheme: Pro-style
- Defensive coordinator: DeWayne Walker (3rd season)
- Base defense: 4–3
- Home stadium: Rose Bowl

Uniform

2008 Pacific-10 Conference football standings
	Conf.			Overall
Team	W		L	W		L
No. 3 USC $	8	–	1	12	–	1
No. 10 Oregon	7	–	2	10	–	3
No. 18 Oregon State	7	–	2	9	–	4
California	6	–	3	9	–	4
Arizona	5	–	4	8	–	5
Arizona State	4	–	5	5	–	7
Stanford	4	–	5	5	–	7
UCLA	3	–	6	4	–	8
Washington State	1	–	8	2	–	11
Washington	0	–	9	0	–	12
$ – Conference champion; Rankings from AP Poll

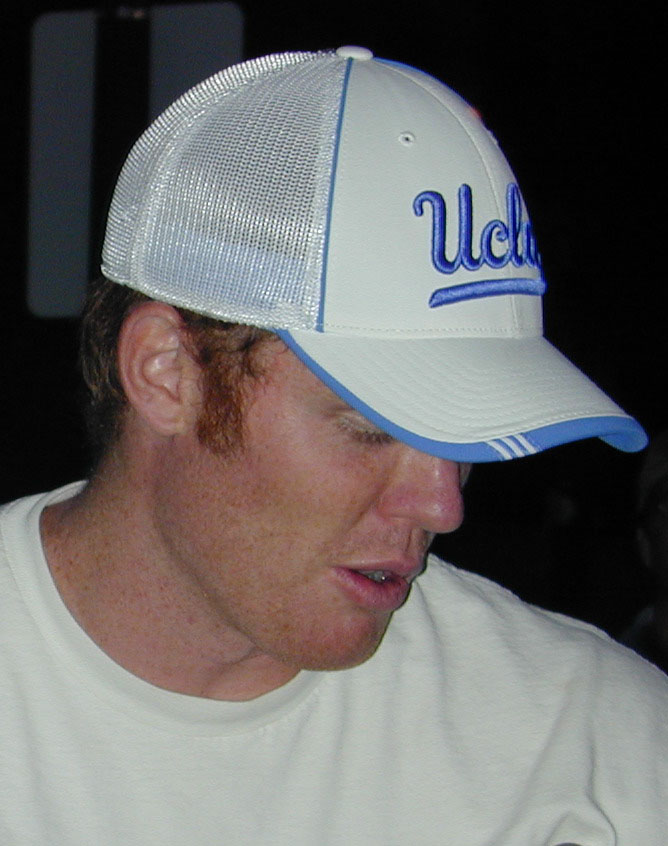
Quarterback Ben Olson

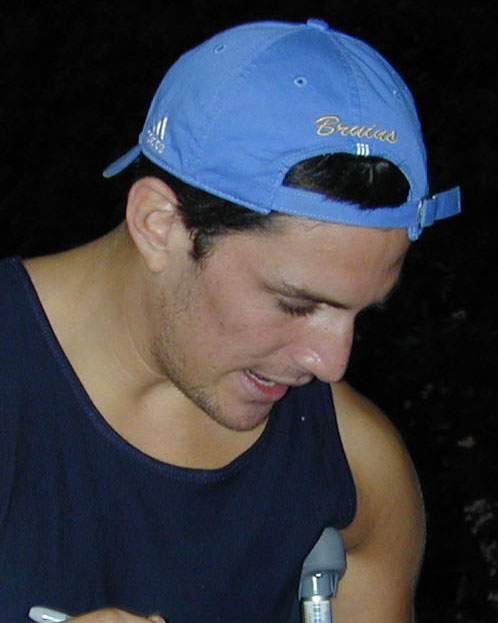
Quarterback Patrick Cowan

The 2008 UCLA Bruins football team represented the University of California, Los Angeles (UCLA) in the 2008 NCAA Division I FBS football season. They opened the season at home against Tennessee under new head coach Rick Neuheisel, at the Rose Bowl stadium in Pasadena, California. The Bruins played six of the Top 25 teams in the 2007 final Associated Press rankings. More than half of the opponents had won nine or more games during the 2007 season.

The Bruins had seven home games and five away games this season, UCLA's 90th season in college football and 27th season at the Rose Bowl. Since moving to the Rose Bowl, the Bruins had a 109–46–2 record, winning 70% (prior to this season).

On Monday, August 19, Neuheisel named Kevin Craft (#3) as starting quarterback for the first game of the season. Both Ben Olson (#7) and Patrick Cowan (#12) were injured in pre-season practices. Other available quarterbacks were Chris Forcier (#8), Osaar Rasshan (#11), and Nick Crissman (#18).

Alterraun Verner and Aaron Perez were named to the 2008 All-Pacific-10 Conference football team. Verner majors in mathematics and Perez is a sociology major. Sophomore place kicker Kai Forbath was named to Associated Press' All-America third team.

== Schedule ==
Date	Time	Opponent	Site	TV	Result	Attendance
September 1	5:00 pm	No. 18 Tennessee*	Rose Bowl; Pasadena, CA	ESPN	W 27–24 ^{OT}	68,546
September 13	12:30 pm	at No. 15 BYU*	LaVell Edwards Stadium; Provo, UT	Versus	L 0–59	64,153
September 20	12:00 pm	Arizona	Rose Bowl; Pasadena, California	FSN	L 10–31	65,434
September 27	12:30 pm	No. 25 Fresno State*	Rose Bowl; Pasadena, CA	ABC	L 31–36	73,963
October 4	7:15 pm	Washington State	Rose Bowl; Pasadena, CA	FSNPT	W 28–3	65,469
October 11	7:15 pm	at Oregon	Autzen Stadium; Eugene, OR	FSN	L 24–31	58,728
October 18	1:00 pm	Stanford^{†}	Rose Bowl; Pasadena, CA (rivalry)	FSNW	W 23–20	64,883
October 25	12:30 pm	at California	California Memorial Stadium; Berkeley, CA (rivalry)	ABC	L 20–41	64,653
November 8	3:00 pm	Oregon State	Rose Bowl; Pasadena, CA	FSNPT	L 6–34	83,478
November 15	7:15 pm	at Washington	Husky Stadium; Seattle, WA	FSN	W 27–7	59,738
November 28	6:30 pm	at Arizona State	Sun Devil Stadium; Tempe, AZ	ESPN2	L 9–34	61,005
December 6	1:30 pm	No. 5 USC	Rose Bowl; Pasadena, CA (Victory Bell)	ABC	L 7–28	87,790
*Non-conference game; ^{†}Homecoming; Rankings from AP Poll released prior to the game; All times are in Pacific time

== Coaching staff ==
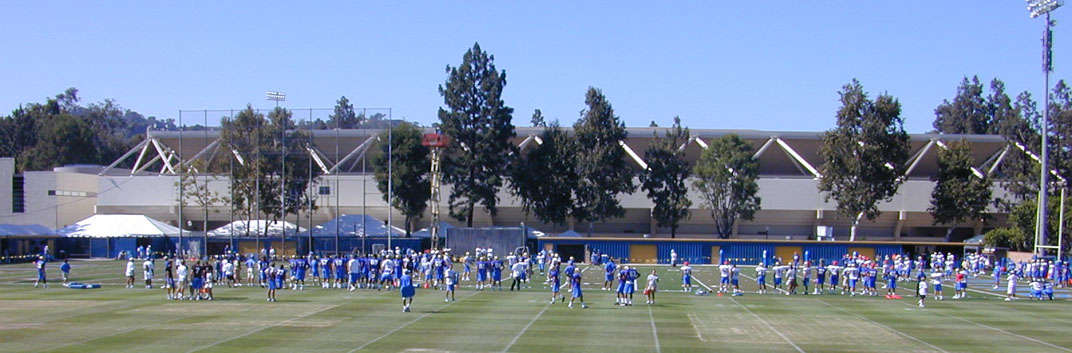
Fall football practices at Spaulding Field

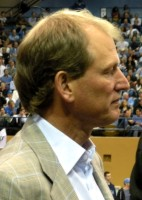
Head coach Rick Neuheisel

=== Rick Neuheisel ===
- MVP, 1984 Rose Bowl game
- Played for USFL San Antonio Gunslingers
- Assistant UCLA football coach
- Played for NFL San Diego Chargers and Tampa Bay Buccaneers
- Head coach, Colorado & Washington
- Quarterback Coach and Offensive Coordinator for NFL Baltimore Ravens

=== DeWayne Walker ===
- Defensive coordinator Walker's defensive unit ranked best in each of his first two seasons.
- UCLA ranked 14th in rushing defense (109.2 yds/game) and 29th in total defense (343.23) in 2007.
- The Bruins also ranked second in tackles for loss per game (8.7), third in thirddown conversion defense (29.1%), tied for 15th in sacks per game (3.0) and tied for 17th in fumbles caused (14).
- The Bruins ranked tied for ninth in the nation in rushing defense (91.08) and ranked fifth in third-down conversion defense (28.4%) in 2006.

=== Norm Chow ===
- Offensive coordinator Chow has worked with several of the NCAA's all-time career pass efficiency leaders.
- He has mentored six quarterbacks selected in the first-round of the NFL draft (Carson Palmer, Matt Leinart, Philip Rivers, Steve Young, Jim McMahon, Marc Wilson).

Other members of the coaching staff include: Wayne Moses, running backs coach; Bob Palcic, offensive line coach; Reggie Moore, wide receivers coach; Todd Howard, defensive line coach; Chuck Bullough, linebackers coach; Tim Hauck, secondary coach; Frank Gansz Jr., special teams.

== Players ==
=== Depth chart ===
Defensive starters

FS
Aaron Ware (27)
Glenn Love (20)

CB
Michael Norris (22)
Aaron Hester (9)

WLB	MLB	SLB
Kyle Bosworth (54)	Reggie Carter (51)	John Hale (12)
Sean Westgate (21)	Steve Sloan (43)	Akeem Ayers (40)

DE	DT	DT	DE
Tom Blake (56)	Brian Price (92)	Brigham Harwell (93)	Korey Bosworth (55)
Reginald Stokes (91)	Jerzy Siewierski (90)	Chase Moline (50)	David Carter (85)

SS
Rahim Moore (3)
Tony Dye (6)

CB
Alterraun Verner (1)
Courtney Viney (7)

Offensive starters

SE
Dominique Johnson (19)
Taylor Embree (82)

LT	LG	C	RG	RT
Micah Kia (73)	Nick Ekbatani (75)	Micah Reed (58)	Sonny Tevaga (55)	Nate Chandler (68)
Brandon Bennett (69)	Darius Savage (77)	Jake Dean (57)	Scott Glicksberg (66)	Mike Harris (65)

TE
Logan Paulsen (86)
Ryan Moya (15)

FL
Marcus Everett (9)
Terrence Austin (4)

QB
Kevin Craft (3)
Chris Forcier (8)

FB
Trevor Theriot (31)
Tobi Umodu (45)

RB
Kahlil Bell (36)
Raymond Carter (20)

SPECIALISTS: PK – Kai Forbath (25), Jeff Locke (49); KO – Jimmy Rotstein (37); P – Aaron Perez (17), 39 Danny Reese (39); LS – Christian Yount (52); H – 17 Aaron Perez (17); PR – Terrence Austin (4), Ryan Graves (2); KOR 4 Terrence Austin (4), Raymond Carter (20).

== Media ==
In addition to the games on TV, the football games were broadcast on the UCLA ISP Sports Network (AM570 Sports, in Los Angeles), with Chris Roberts, Matt Stevens and Wayne Cook. 2008 marked the 17th year of the voice of the Bruins for Roberts, 12th season for Stevens, and 7th year for Cook. Both Stevens and Cook are former quarterbacks for UCLA.

== Game summaries ==
=== Tennessee ===
	1	2	3	4	OT	Total
Volunteers	0	14	0	10	0	24
Bruins	7	0	3	14	3	27

This was the season-opening game for both teams. Tennessee held a 7–4–2 record on the Bruins before game time. Only San Diego State had more games with the Bruins in a non-conference series history. The 1996 game against Tennessee set an attendance record with a crowd of 106,297 at Neyland Stadium.

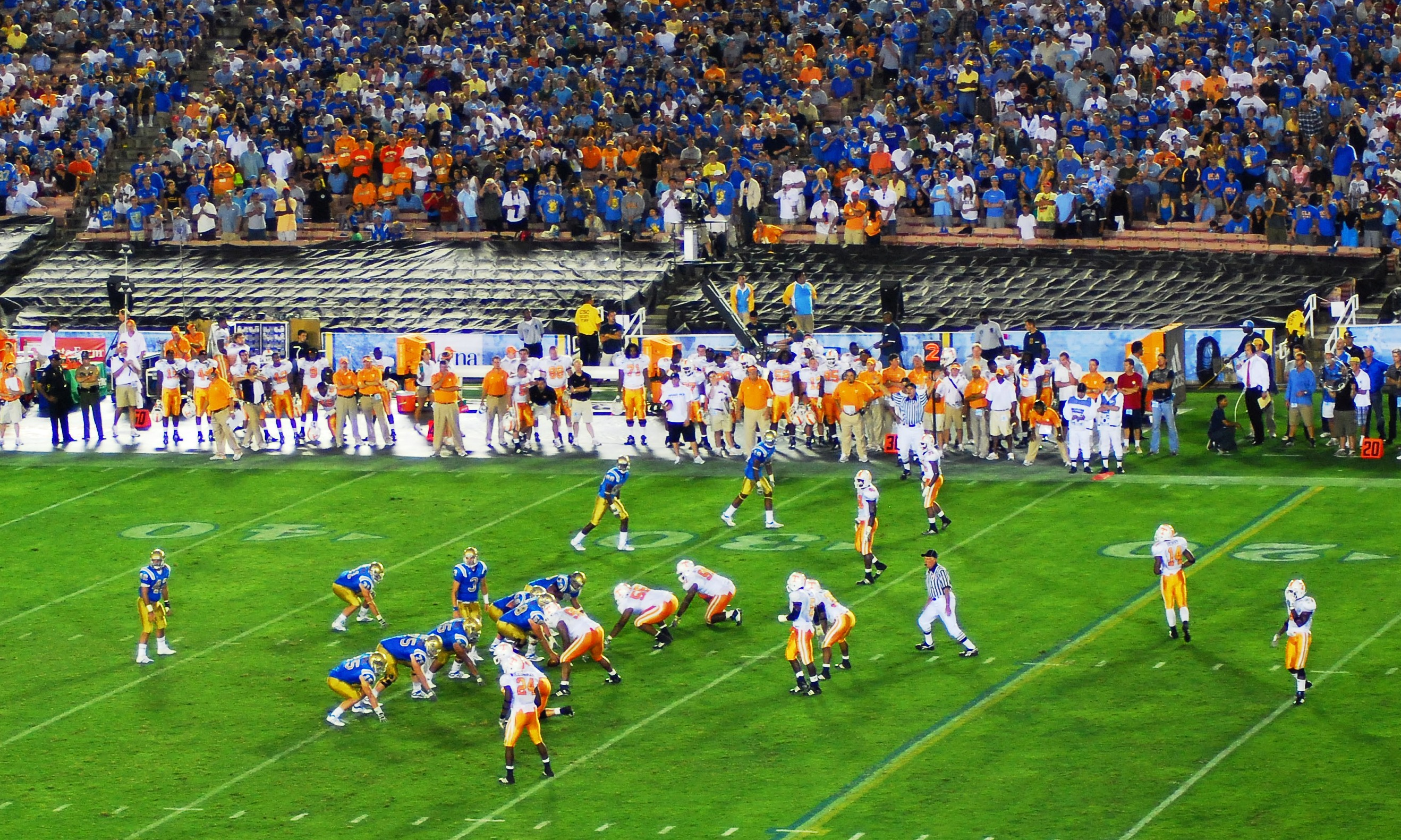
UCLA on offense

UCLA and the University of Tennessee agreed to move up their football game to Labor Day in order to have the game nationally televised on ESPN as one of only two football games played on the final day of college football opening weekend. The game was originally scheduled for September 6. The game kicked off from the Rose Bowl at 5 p.m. Pacific Time in the ESPN Monday Night Football time slot, which for the rest of the season was devoted to NFL professional football. The moving of the game altered the schedules of the two teams. Tennessee was scheduled to begin the season on August 30 against the University of Alabama-Birmingham, but that game was moved to September 13. UCLA changed the September 6 slot to be an open date.

UCLA went ahead in the first quarter when Sean Westgate returned a blocked-punt for a 17-yard touchdown. After throwing four interceptions in the first half, Kevin Craft threw a 3-yard pass to Ryan Moya in a 70-yard drive that gave UCLA the lead late in the fourth quarter. Then Tennessee's Daniel Lincoln's 47-yard field goal tied the game with no time in regulation. But Kai Forbath kicked a 42-yard field goal to give the Bruins a 27–24 lead in overtime. The Volunteers were unable to match the Bruins in overtime when Lincoln's field goal attempt went wide left.

The win made Rick Neuheisel, a former UCLA quarterback who was the 1984 Rose Bowl MVP, only the third head coach to win in the first game. The win also marked the first win as a Bruin offensive coordinator for Norm Chow.

Tennessee Head Coach Phil Fulmer has a season opener record of 14–3, with all three losses coming to teams in California: a 25–23 loss to UCLA at the Rose Bowl in 1994, a 45–31 loss to California in 2007, and this game.

=== BYU ===
	1	2	3	4	Total
Bruins	0	0	0	0	0
Cougars	7	35	17	0	59

It was a homecoming for Norman Chow, who was an assistant coach at BYU for many years. Dewayne Walker also coached the Cougars as defensive coordinator. The Bruins held a 7–2 record on the Cougars prior to the game. BYU was ranked No. 18 in the AP Top 25 poll and No. 15 in the USA Today/Coaches Poll. Former BYU quarterback Ben Olson did not play due to injuries. In his first career start at San Diego State, Kevin Craft completed 20 of 32 passes for 216 yards against BYU.

BYU scored first on a Max Hall pass to Dennis Pitta for 10 yards for a touchdown; then another Hall pass to Austin Collie for a two-yard score in the second quarter. UCLA fumbled the ball and the Cougars recovered, which led to Hall's pass to Collie for the third touchdown. The Bruins again fumbled and Hall had his 4th touchdown pass to Michael Reed. Another Bruins' fumble gave Hall his 5th pass touchdown. Before the end of second quarter, Hall threw his 6th pass (2 yards) to Pitta.

In the second half, Max Hall passed to Harvey Unga for a 6-yard touchdown, Mitch Payne kicked a 24-yard field goal and Wayne Latu rushed for a 13-yard touchdown to give BYU the 59–0 win. This was the worst loss the Bruins endured since a 76–0 defeat in the very first UCLA–USC rivalry football game.

=== Arizona ===
	1	2	3	4	Total
Wildcats	3	14	0	14	31
Bruins	7	3	0	0	10

The Bruins held a 19–11–2 record on the Wildcats at game time. On a day when the Bruins were woeful in punt coverage and bad in third down conversions, the Arizona Wildcats won 31–10 in the Rose Bowl. Arizona quarterback Willie Tuitama, who had been a thorn to UCLA for the last couple of years, threw 222 yards and a pair of touchdowns to tight end Rob Gronkowski.

The only touchdown for UCLA came from Korey Bosworth, who recovered a Wildcat fumble and rolled one yard into the end zone for the score. Kai Fobath kicked a 35-yard field goal to cut Arizona's lead to 17–10 at half-time.

No scoring by either team in the third quarter, but Arizona took care of that by scoring two touchdowns with the short fields in the final period. UCLA running back Chane Moline (#42) had 72 yards rushing and Arizona's wide receiver Mike Thomas (#10) caught for 112 yards. Aaron Perez kicked two punts for more than 50 yards for the Bruins and they were downed inside the two-yard line.

=== Fresno State ===
	1	2	3	4	Total
Bulldogs	7	13	16	0	36
Bruins	7	12	5	7	31

Before the game, the Bruins held a 6–1 record on the Bulldogs. The game was a public safety appreciation game. Because of a knee injury, Fresno State's top defense lineman Jon Monga did not play.

A Derrick Coleman fumble in the redzone in the fourth quarter took away the Bruins' hope of keeping the Bulldogs from winning a game in the Rose Bowl stadium. Fresno State won its first game there by five points, taking control of the final 8 minutes and 55 seconds and not allowing a UCLA comeback.

=== Washington State ===
	1	2	3	4	Total
Cougars	0	0	3	0	3
Bruins	0	14	7	7	28

The Bruins had a 35–18–1 record on the Cougars. UCLA Athletics Hall of Fame Ceremony was held during half-time. The game was the conference opener for both teams.

UCLA quarterback Kevin Craft (#3) passed for 224 yards, Derrick Coleman (#33) rushed for 51 yards and Terrence Austin (#4) had 78 yards of receiving in this game. There were no UCLA turnovers for the first time since their game at Arizona on November 3, 2007. With the win, Coach Rick Neuheisel has a 6–0 record on the Washington State Cougars.

=== Oregon ===
	1	2	3	4	Total
Bruins	0	0	14	10	24
Ducks	7	7	7	10	31

The Ducks beat the Washington Huskies 44–10 in the first game of the season. UCLA led the series with a 39–22 record on Oregon.

The Oregon Ducks handed UCLA a fourth loss for the season by scoring two touchdowns in the first half. In the early third quarter, Derrick Coleman scored a touchdown for UCLA, but the Ducks answered with a LeGarrette Blout touchdown within 90 seconds. Kahlil Bell scored with 27 seconds left in the third quarter to close the gap at 21–14.

Fourth quarter saw both teams scoring a field goal and a touchdown. Jeff Miller caught a touchdown pass for the Bruins and Blount had a touchdown for the Ducks.

=== Stanford ===
	1	2	3	4	Total
Cardinal	7	7	0	6	20
Bruins	0	6	7	10	23

It was Homecoming, parent's weekend and high school Band Day at the Rose Bowl for the Bruins. High school bands, along with Stanford Band and UCLA Band performed during half time. The Cardinal started the season with a Pac-10 win over the Beavers 36–28 and had a 4–3 (3–1 in Pac-10) record entering the game. In the previous week, the Cardinal beat Arizona 24–23 in an exciting conference game, while the Bruins lost a close game to the Ducks. UCLA had a record of 44–31–3 on the Cardinal going into the game.

With ten seconds left and UCLA behind by four points, quarterback Kevin Craft passed to freshman Cory Harkey for a 7-yard touchdown in the northeast corner of the Rose Bowl to stage an upset win, 23–20, over the Stanford Cardinal. Two turnovers by the Bruins led to the 14 Stanford points in the first half.

In the game, Bruins' Craft had 285 passing yards and Taylor Embree caught 72 yards, while Stanford's Toby Gerhard rushed for 138 yards. Also for UCLA, Terrence Austin scored on a 2-yard pass from Craft and Kai Forbath kicked three field goals (37, 19, and 28 yards). Gerhard scored two touchdowns and Aaron Zagory kicked two field goals (40 and 29 yards) for Stanford.

=== California ===
	1	2	3	4	Total
Bruins	0	10	3	7	20
Golden Bears	3	14	0	24	41

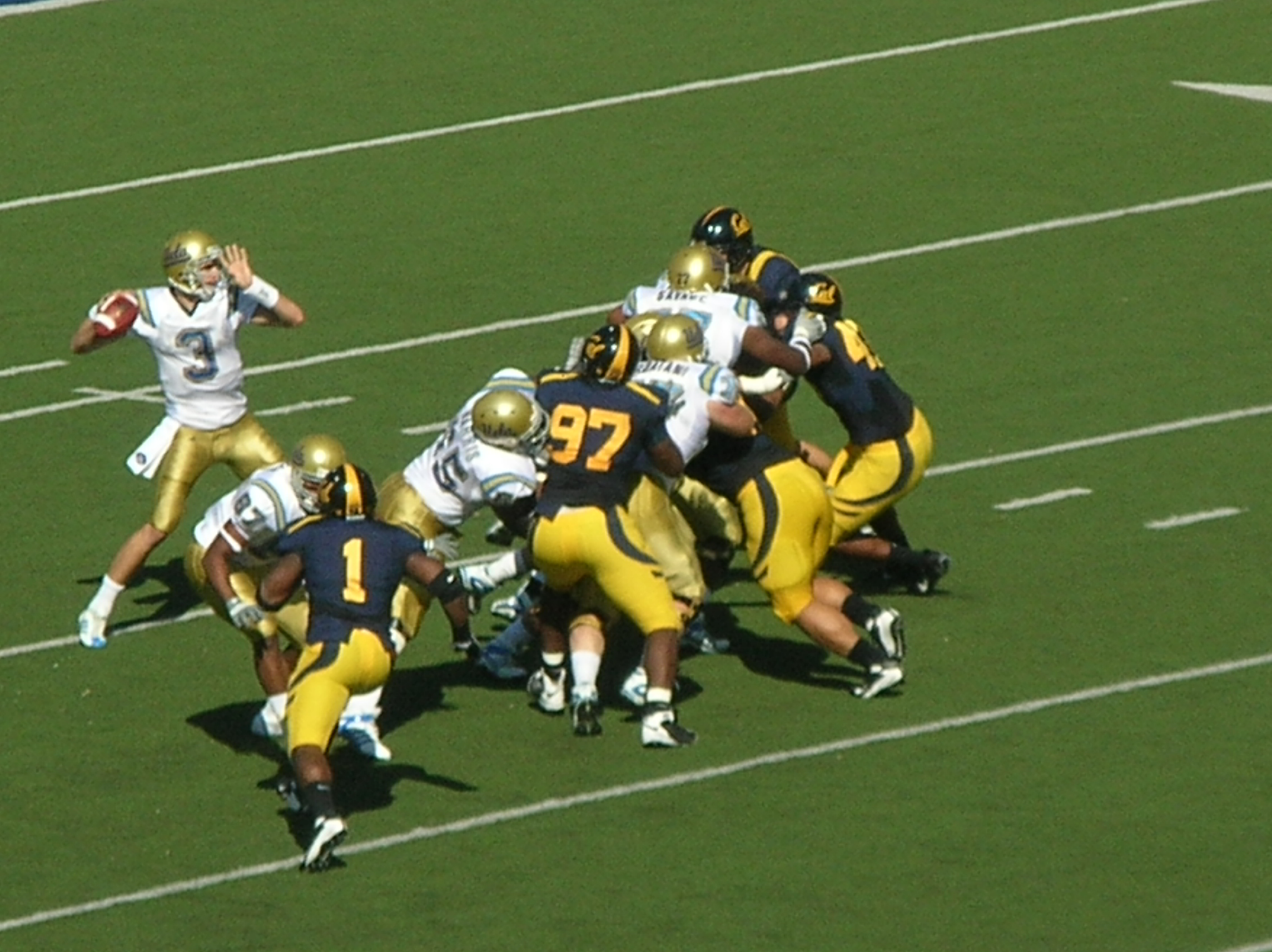
Craft passes

Cal quarterback Kevin Riley started for the Bears, his first since nearly a month before against Colorado State on September 27. The Bruins took their only lead of the game at the beginning of the second quarter by managing to block a punt attempt by Bryan Anger and recovering the ball in the end zone to go up 7–3. On the ensuing possession Jahvid Best was able to break free for 34-yard run, the only offensive touchdown in the first half for the Bears. Marcus Ezeff then intercepted a pass by Bruins quarterback Kevin Craft which he was able to return for a 69-yard touchdown. Both teams then traded field goals into the fourth quarter. After getting a stop on a fake Bruins punt attempt which nearly converted a 4th and 23 with a 22-yard pass, Riley hit Nyan Boateng for a 53-yard touchdown. Michael Mohammed then intercepted a Craft pass for a 19-yard score. Riley threw his second touchdown pass of the game on a ten-yard strike to Cameron Morrah. UCLA got in the final score of the game when backup quarterback Chris Forcier threw a nine-yard pass to Dominique Johnson, which was set up by a kickoff return by wide receiver Terrence Austin for 81 yards.

Craft passed for 206 yards and was picked off four times, two coming off tipped balls. Wide receiver Taylor Embree had 90 yards receiving. The Bears held the Bruins to 16 yards rushing, while Jahvid Best ran for 115 and Shane Vereen had 99. Riley passed for 153 yards and two touchdowns, although he was sacked three times. The victory continued Cal's win streak against UCLA at Memorial Stadium, having not lost to the Bruins at home since 1998.

=== Oregon State ===
	1	2	3	4	Total
Beavers	3	0	14	17	34
Bruins	3	0	3	0	6

Veterans and Armed Forces Appreciation Day at the Rose Bowl, honoring the U.S. service men and women. Flyover by the United States Air Force. UCLA led the series with a 39–13–4 record.

The Oregon State Beavers took the game away from the Bruins in the second half by scoring 14 points after half-time in the third quarter and allowing only a field goal to UCLA. Kevin Craft was intercepted twice in the fourth quarter to dash any hope of a comeback. Highlights for the Bruins included a 67-yard punt by Aaron Perez, Taylor Embree's five receptions for 64 yards and Reggie Carter's 10 tackles.

=== Washington ===
	1	2	3	4	Total
Bruins	7	10	0	10	27
Huskies	7	0	0	0	7

Huskies head coach Tyrone Willingham already had been fired from his position. On October 27, 2008, the University of Washington announced that he will not be retained as head coach after the completion of Washington's 2008 football season. Willingham became the third Washington coach to be fired (out of the last four) since Hall of Fame coach Don James resigned in 1993 because of pending NCAA and Pac-10 sanctions against his team where his players were determined to have "accepted substantial and illegal benefits under James, likely with his knowledge".

UCLA coach Neuheisel had been fired in the summer of 2003 from the University of Washington in relation to his participation in a neighborhood pool for the 2003 NCAA Division I men's basketball tournament and lies he told about his actions. The University of Washington had its probation extended for failing to monitor its football program. This was Neuheisel's first return to Husky Stadium following the firing. There was some booing, but not a significant amount. The Huskies had been on a winless streak all season, and were at 0–9.

The day was sunny and dry, so weather was not a factor as can often be the case in Seattle in November. Under the direction of quarterback Kevin Craft, the Bruins drove 80 yards in 12 plays. Running back Derrick Coleman rushed for a touchdown in the first half. In the second half, the Bruins launched a ninety-two-yard drive. Backed up against the goal line, running back Kahlil Bell ran four straight times, and Craft followed with several key pass completions. UCLA finally scored on a run by Bell, taking the 24–7 lead.

=== Arizona State ===
	1	2	3	4	Total
Bruins	3	3	3	0	9
Sun Devils	0	14	3	17	34

UCLA led the series 15–8–1 entering the game, following the Sun Devils' 2007 24–20 win.

The Sun Devils ended UCLA's hope of postseason play with a 34–9 victory over the Bruins. Kai Forbath kicked three field goals, including a 53-yarder, for all of the Bruins' points. ASU had four defensive touchdowns, including a 100-yard interception touchdown.

In the game, Marcus Everett caught eight passes for 75 yards, Michael Norris had six tackles, and Korey Bosworth tallied two sacks during the game for UCLA. A school record was set when Aaron Perez punted eight times for a total career punt yards mark and Terrence Austin ran for 188 all purpose yards, 131 yards in kickoff returns.

=== USC ===
	1	2	3	4	Total
Trojans	14	7	7	0	28
Bruins	7	0	0	0	7

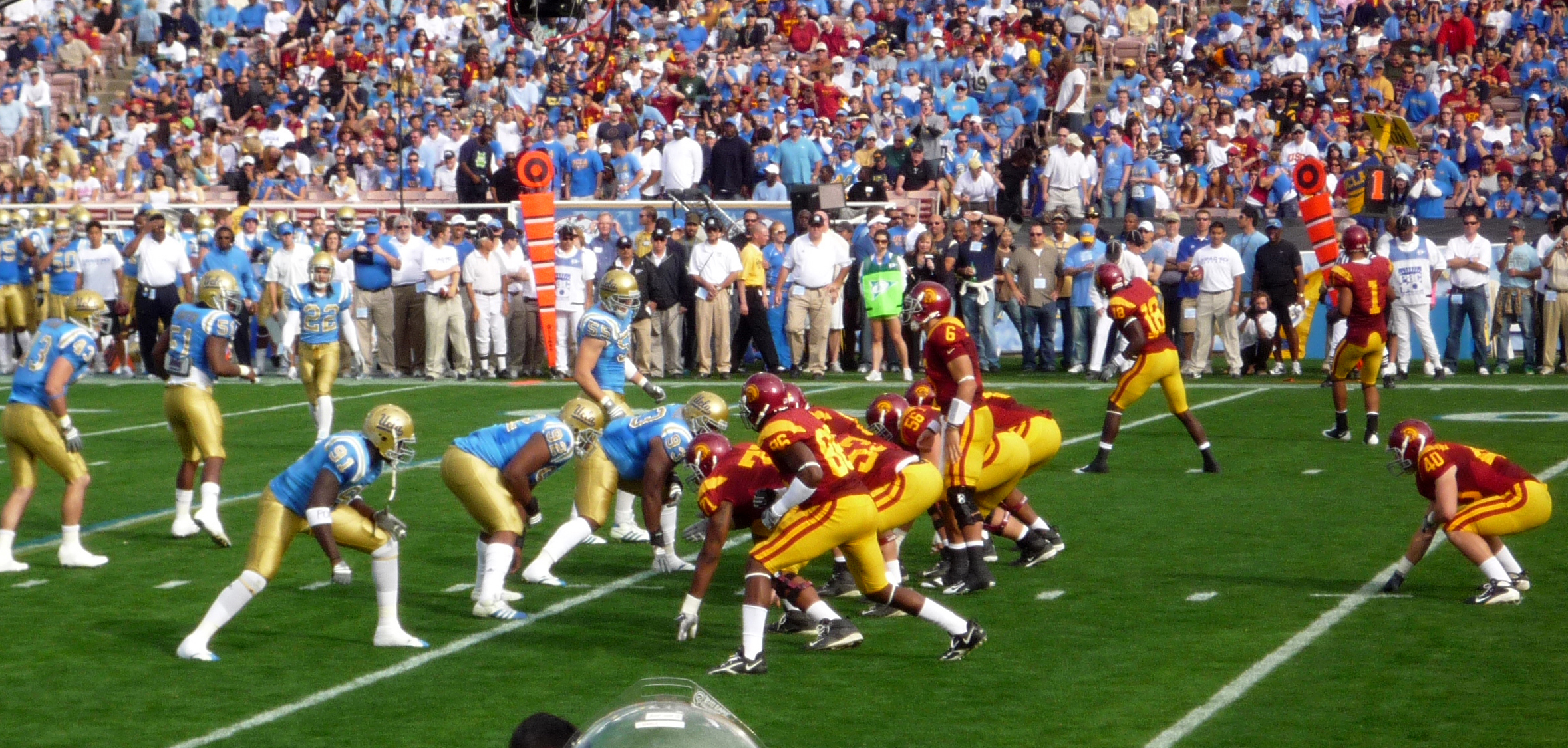
The 2008 edition of the rivalry marked a return to the tradition of both teams playing in home jerseys.

USC led the series, 42–28–7, but UCLA had an 8–5 record over the Trojans in the Rose Bowl. Rick Neuheisel vs. USC was 1-1. Senior athlete salute. Before the season, this game garnered interest in seeing how coach Rick Neuheisel would perform in his battle to gain supremacy in Los Angeles. Both schools wore their home colorful uniforms, the first time since 1982.

A fumble recovery turned into a pass reception touchdown by Kahlil Bell in the beginning of the game was all the scoring by the Bruins in this the latest cross-town rivalry game. Quarterback Kevin Craft completed 11 out of 28 passes for a total of 89 yards and had one pass intercepted. He finished the season with 232 completions, second place in history. Terrence Austin set a new school record with 1,878 all-purpose yards, surpassing Maurice Jones Drew, who had 1,863 yards in 2005.

Joe McKnight (12-yard run), Damian Williams (12-yard pass from Mark Sanchez), Stafon Johnson (2-yard run) and Patrick Turner (18-yard pass from Sanchez) accounted for the Trojans' scores. Sanchez passed for 269 yards, McKnight ran for 99 yards and Turner caught for 81 yards.

== Bibliography ==
- UCLA Bruins football media guide 2008 Edition (preseason information)
