= Madden Williams =

American football player (born 2007)

No. 17 – Texas A&M Aggies
- Position: Wide receiver
- Class: Freshman

Personal information
- Born: June 9, 2007 (age 19); Irvine, California, U.S.
- Listed height: 6 ft 1 in (1.85 m)
- Listed weight: 187 lb (85 kg)

Career information
- High school: St. John Bosco (Bellflower, California)
- College: Texas A&M (2026–present)
- Stats at ESPN

Madden Williams (born June 9, 2007) is an American college football wide receiver for the Texas A&M Aggies.

== Early life ==
Williams attended St. John Bosco High School in Bellflower, California where he was a three year starter on varsity as well as a stand out on the basketball team. In June 2025, Adidas signed Williams to one of the companies first high school football NIL deals. During his high school career he amassed 133 receptions for 2157 yards and 28 touchdowns. He was a three time All-Trinity league, All-CIF and All-State selection. Additionally, he was named to the MaxPreps All-American team in both his junior and senior seasons. Along with also receiving Rivals All-American honors. At the conclusion of his senior season in 2025 he was named State of California WR of the Year and selected to play in the Navy All-American bowl. A consensus four star recruit, Williams committed to play college football for the Texas A&M Aggies over offers from schools such as Ohio State, Oregon, Penn State and USC.
