= Jason Michael =

American football player and coach (born 1978)

Personal information
- Born: October 15, 1978 (age 48); Louisa, Kentucky, U.S.

Career information
- Position: Quarterback
- High school: Lawrence County (KY)
- College: Western Kentucky

Career history
- Tennessee (2003–2004) Graduate assistant; Oakland Raiders (2005) Quality control coordinator; New York Jets (2006) Quality control coordinator & quarterbacks coach; New York Jets (2007) Tight ends coach; Tennessee (2008) Tight ends coach; San Francisco 49ers (2009–2010) Offensive assistant & quarterbacks coach; San Diego Chargers (2011–2013) Tights end coach; Tennessee Titans (2014–2015) Offensive coordinator; Tennessee Titans (2016–2017) Quarterbacks coach; Arizona Cardinals (2018) Tight ends coach; Indianapolis Colts (2019–2020) Tight ends coach; Philadelphia Eagles (2021–2025) Tight ends coach

Awards and highlights
- Super Bowl champion (LIX)
- Coaching profile at Pro Football Reference

Jason Michael (born October 15, 1978) is an American football coach who was most recently the tight ends coach for the Philadelphia Eagles of the National Football League (NFL). He previously served as an assistant coach for the Indianapolis Colts, Arizona Cardinals, Tennessee Titans, San Diego Chargers, San Francisco 49ers, New York Jets, and Oakland Raiders.

== Playing career ==
Michael played quarterback for Jack Harbaugh at Western Kentucky after transferring from Army. He was the quarterback of the 2002 Division I-AA National Championship team. Michael was named the school's Male Athlete of the Year in 2003. He graduated with a degree in civil engineering technology with a perfect 4.0 G.P.A. and was named a I-AA Athletic Directors Academic All-Star and a second-team Verizon Academic All-District IV honoree.

== Coaching career ==
=== Tennessee Volunteers ===
In 2003, Michael began his coaching career as a graduate assistant for the Tennessee Volunteers football team at the University of Tennessee, where he assisted with the secondary and special teams for two seasons.

=== Oakland Raiders ===
In 2005, Michael was hired as a video assistant and offensive quality control coach for the Oakland Raiders.

=== New York Jets ===
Michael then was hired as an offensive quality control coach for the New York Jets in 2006. In 2007, he was promoted to tight ends coach.

=== Tennessee (second stint) ===
Michael returned to the University of Tennessee to coach the tight ends in 2008, in Phillip Fulmer’s final season.

=== San Francisco 49ers ===
In 2009, Michael was hired by the San Francisco 49ers as an offensive assistant and quarterbacks coach.

=== San Diego Chargers ===
Michael was hired by the San Diego Chargers as the tight ends coach in 2011.

=== Tennessee Titans ===
On January 17, 2014, Michael was hired by the Tennessee Titans as their offensive coordinator under head coach Mike Mularkey. He moved to quarterbacks coach in 2016.

=== Arizona Cardinals ===
On February 14, 2018, Michael was hired by the Arizona Cardinals as their tight ends coach under head coach Steve Wilks.

=== Indianapolis Colts ===
On January 29, 2019, Michael was hired by the Indianapolis Colts as their tight ends coach under head coach Frank Reich.

=== Philadelphia Eagles ===
On January 27, 2021, Michael was hired by the Philadelphia Eagles as their tight ends coach under head coach Nick Sirianni. Michael and Sirianni worked together in Indianapolis. Michael was part of the staff that won Super Bowl LIX over the Kansas City Chiefs.

== Personal life ==
Michael and his wife, Jamie, have one son, Wyatt, and a daughter, Charlie.
