= Tim Cowan =

American football player (born 1960)

No. 14, 11
- Position: Quarterback

Personal information
- Born: August 17, 1960 (age 66); Lynwood, California, U.S.
- Listed height: 6 ft 0 in (1.83 m)
- Listed weight: 190 lb (86 kg)

Career information
- High school: St. Paul (Santa Fe Springs, California)
- College: Washington (1979–1982)

Career history
- 1983–1986: BC Lions
- 1986: Toronto Argonauts
- 1987: Seattle Seahawks*
- * Offseason or practice squad member only

Awards and highlights
- Grey Cup champion (1985)

Career statistics
- Passing comp: 184
- Passing att: 378
- Passing yards: 2,659
- Passing TDs: 21

Timothy John Cowan (born August 17, 1960) is an American former professional football player who was a quarterback for four seasons in the Canadian Football League (CFL) with the BC Lions and Toronto Argonauts. He played college football for the Washington Huskies. He was a member of the Lions team that won the 73rd Grey Cup.

== Early life and college ==
Timothy John Cowan was born on August 17, 1960, in Lynwood, California. He attended St. Paul High School in Santa Fe Springs, California.

Cowan was a member of the Huskies of the University of Washington from 1979 to 1982. He completed six of 19 passes (31.6%) for 109 yards, and one touchdown in 1980. In 1981, he recorded 13 completions on 20 passing attempts (65.0%) for 182 yards, one touchdown, and three interceptions. Cowan completed 64 of 118 passes (54.2%) for 800 yards, eight touchdowns, and four interceptions during his final year at Washington in 1982.

== Professional career ==
Cowan was selected by the Boston Breakers in the 16th round, with the 182nd overall pick, of the 1983 USFL draft.

Cowan signed with the BC Lions of the Canadian Football League (CFL) on March 17, 1983. He dressed in three games for the Lions that year as a backup to Roy Dewalt and Joe Paopao, completing five of 21 passes (23.8%) for 53 yards. Cowan dressed in all 16 games, starting four, during the 1984 season and totaled 96 completions on 186 passing attempts (51.6%) for 1,434 yards, 13 touchdowns, and ten interceptions. He also fumbled six times, losing five of them. His four starts came after Dewalt suffered a broken collarbone. Cowan dressed in 14 games for the Lions in 1985, backing up Dewalt once again. Cowan completed 43 of 76 passes (56.6%) for 599 yards, six touchdowns, and five interceptions that season. On November 24, 1985, the Lions won the 73rd Grey Cup against the Hamilton Tiger-Cats by a score of 37–24. He continued his backup role to Dewalt in 1986, dressing in nine games while completing 20 of 47 passes (42.6%) for 271 yards and four interceptions.

On August 22, 1986, Cowan was traded to the Toronto Argonauts for the Argonauts' first pick in the 1987 CFL draft. He dressed in nine games for the Argonauts during the 1986 season, recording 20 completions on 48 attempts (41.7%) for 302 yards, two touchdowns, and seven interceptions. He became a free agent after the season.

Cowan signed with the Seattle Seahawks of the National Football League on May 13, 1987. He was released on June 10, 1987.

== Personal life ==
Cowan's sons Joe and Patrick played football at UCLA.
