= St. John Bosco High School =

Private school in California, United States

Location
- 13640 Bellflower Boulevard; Bellflower, Los Angeles County, California 90706; United States; 33°54′25″N 118°7′28″W

Information
- Type: Private school, Single-sex education
- Motto: Ad Deum Qui Laetificat Juventutem Meam (To God, Who Gives Joy To My Youth)
- Religious affiliations: Roman Catholic; Salesian
- Patron saint: St. John Bosco
- Established: 1940
- CEEB code: 050-260
- President: Fr. Mel Trinidad
- Director: Fr. Mike Gergen, SDB
- Principal: Mr. Ernest Antonelli
- Faculty: 107
- Grades: 9–12
- Enrollment: 855 (2018–2019)
- Average class size: 28
- Student to teacher ratio: 14:1
- Campus size: 36 acres (150,000 m^{2})
- Colors: Blue, white and gold
- Athletics: 13 varsity interscholastic sports teams
- Athletics conference: CIF Southern Section; Trinity League
- Nickname: Braves
- Accreditation: Western Association of Schools and Colleges
- Newspaper: The Brave
- Website: http://www.bosco.org

St. John Bosco High School (SJBHS) is a Salesian all-boys college preparatory high school located in Bellflower, California, US, operated by the San Francisco Province of the Salesdian order.

The school is named after the order's founder, John Bosco, an Italian saint known for his dedication to educating and advocating for youth and for his "Home-School-Church-Playground" model of education. The school was founded as an elementary and intermediate boarding school in 1940. The first high school class graduated in 1956. In 1979 the boarding school closed, but was later resumed.

== Notable alumni ==
- Chad Allen – actor
- Terrell Bynum — NFL wide receiver
- Steve Carfino – basketball player for the Iowa Hawkeyes and Australian National Basketball League
- James Cotton – former NBA player for the Seattle SuperSonics
- Schea Cotton – basketball player
- Joe Cowan – graduated in 2003, holds numerous school records in track and field and football; played for the UCLA Bruins football team
- Patrick Cowan – graduated in 2004, former starting quarterback for the UCLA Bruins football team
- Benjamin Cruz – retired Chief Justice of Guam, Democratic Senator in the Guam Legislature, member Democratic National Committee
- Wyatt Davis – NFL offensive lineman
- Tim DeRuyter – college football coach, including former Fresno State head coach
- Tyler Dorsey – basketball player for the Atlanta Hawks, Memphis Grizzlies, and Maccabi Tel Aviv of the Israeli Premier League and the EuroLeague
- Nomar Garciaparra – graduated in 1991, MLB player for the Boston Red Sox, Chicago Cubs, Los Angeles Dodgers, and Oakland Athletics; currently a TV commentator for the Los Angeles Dodgers
- Jelani Gardner – McDonald's All-American basketball player for Cal and Pepperdine
- Ralen Goforth – NFL linebacker for the Green Bay Packers
- Earnest Greene – college football player
- Daniel Hamilton – basketball player
- Isaac Hamilton – college basketball player
- George Holani – NFL running back for the Seattle Seahawks; played college football for the Boise State Broncos
- Todd Husak – Stanford and NFL quarterback
- Joey Karam – plays keyboard/synthesizer for The Locust and One Day as a Lion
- Dennis Lamp – MLB pitcher for the Chicago Cubs (1977–80), Chicago White Sox (1981–83), Toronto Blue Jays (1984–86), Oakland Athletics (1987), Boston Red Sox (1988–91) and Pittsburgh Pirates
- Evan Longoria – graduated in 2003, Arizona Diamondbacks third baseman, 2008 American League rookie of the year
- Trent McDuffie – NFL cornerback; Super Bowl LVII, LVIII champion with the Kansas City Chiefs
- Leon McFadden – former NFL cornerback
- DeAndre Moore Jr. – college football wide receiver
- Aaron Pico – former freestyle wrestler, current MMA fighter
- Keith Price – former University of Washington quarterback, current college football coach
- Bill Reid — former NFL center
- Kris Rosales – basketball player
- Josh Rosen – former NFL and UCLA Bruins quarterback
- Bud Smith – MLB pitcher for the St. Louis Cardinals, one of only 18 MLB pitchers since 1900 to throw no-hitter during his rookie season
- Bryce Treggs – NFL wide receiver
- Jacob Tuioti-Mariner – NFL defensive tackle
- DJ Uiagalelei – NFL quarterback
- Matayo Uiagalelei – football player
- Zahid Valencia – folkstyle and freestyle wrestler
- Kyngstonn Viliamu-Asa – linebacker for the Notre Dame Fighting Irish
- Madden Williams – college football wide receiver
