= Joe Cowan =

Canadian gridiron football player (born 1984)

Profile
- Position: Wide receiver

Personal information
- Born: September 15, 1984 (age 42); Vancouver, British Columbia

Career information
- High school: St. John Bosco (Bellflower, California)
- College: UCLA (2003–2006)

Joseph William Cowan (born September 15, 1984) is a Canadian-born American former college football wide receiver for the UCLA Bruins.

== High school ==
Cowan played at St. John Bosco High School in Bellflower, California. There he played on both offense and defense. As a junior, he made 37 receptions for 917 yards and 9 touchdowns. As a senior, he caught 41 passes for 698 yards and 10 touchdowns. After his senior year, he was selected to play in the CaliFlorida and 2003 Shrine All-Star games. He also was named to the Tacoma News Tribune Western 100, Long Beach Press-Telegram Best in the West team, Long Beach Press-Telegram Dream Team first-team defense, All-CIF Southern Section first team, All-CIF-SS Division I first team, L.A. Times All-Star team as defensive back, L.A. Times Southeast/South Coast Player of the Year, Serra League MVP as a senior, and he was named team MVP after his senior year. He also received the Scholar-Athlete award from the National Football Foundation and College Hall of Fame.

Cowan also lettered his senior year in basketball where he helped lead the Braves to a CIF-SS Div. II-AA title against Inglewood in 2003, and three years in track where he finished fourth in the State 300-meter hurdles in 2002 and second in the CIF-SS 400 meters in 2003.

== College career ==
As a true freshman at UCLA in 2003, Cowan played in 11 games, but saw limited action. In total, he made 7 catches for 31 yards and 1 touchdown. He was also credited with a tackle against San Diego State.

In 2004, Cowan saw more playing time. On the year he made 13 catches for 228 yards, including a 5 reception, 95-yard night against Cal. That night, he also scored his only touchdown of the year.

Cowan once again improved his numbers from the previous year. He played in all 12 games and made 35 catches for 469 yards, both second-best on the team. He also scored 3 touchdowns, and rushed once for 6 yards.

Cowan sat out the 2006 season due to an injury and received a redshirt. He played in 2007 and had 29 receptions for 405 yards.

== Personal ==
Cowan's brother Patrick also played on the UCLA football team as a quarterback. Their father Tim Cowan is a former University of Washington and CFL quarterback.
