= Patrick Cowan =

Canadian gridiron football player (born 1986)

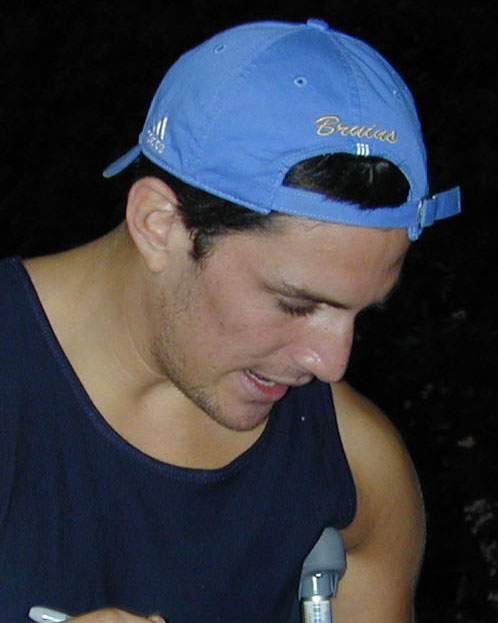
- Cowan in August 2008

Profile
- Position: Quarterback

Personal information
- Born: March 23, 1986 (age 40); Surrey, British Columbia, Canada
- Listed height: 6 ft 4 in (1.93 m)
- Listed weight: 218 lb (99 kg)

Career information
- High school: St. John Bosco (Bellflower, California)
- College: UCLA
- NFL draft: 2009: undrafted

Career history
- New Orleans Saints (2009)*
- * Offseason or practice squad member only

Patrick Edmund Cowan (born March 23, 1986) is a Canadian-born former American football quarterback.

Cowan was previously the starting quarterback at UCLA after starter Ben Olson was injured in the middle of the 2006 season. Cowan was a redshirt sophomore. His best game came when he went 12/21 for 124 yards when the Bruins upset the #2 USC Trojans on December 2, 2006. With the win, the Bruins qualified for the Emerald Bowl against Florida State. Cowan was 15/26 for 240 yards, two touchdowns and two interceptions in the loss to Florida State.

Cowan and USC linebacker Rey Maualuga will be remembered in the tradition-filled UCLA-USC football rivalry for a violent sideline collision-tackle of Cowan in the 2nd quarter of the 2006 game, which was broadcast to a national television audience. To Cowan's credit, after the collision he walked to his sideline unassisted and returned to play the remainder of the contest. In the post-game ESPN telecast, legendary college football coach Lou Holtz observed that the Maualuga tackle of Cowan was "the most violent tackle I have ever seen on a college football field".

Cowan ended his UCLA football career due to a knee injury during the 2008 spring practices. He served as an undergraduate assistant coach on the football team in 2008. He was eligible for the 2009 NFL draft, but was not selected. Following the draft he was signed and later released by the New Orleans Saints.

== Personal ==
Cowan played at UCLA alongside his brother, Joe. Cowan attended St. John Bosco High School in Bellflower, California. Both brothers were born in Canada while their father Tim Cowan played quarterback for the BC Lions of the CFL. Patrick also served with the Peace Corps in Kenya. Pat Cowan is currently employed at his alma mater, UCLA, as executive director, Office of Regional Giving.

== See also ==
- 2008 UCLA Bruins football team
- 2007 UCLA Bruins football team
