= Demetrice Morley =

American football player

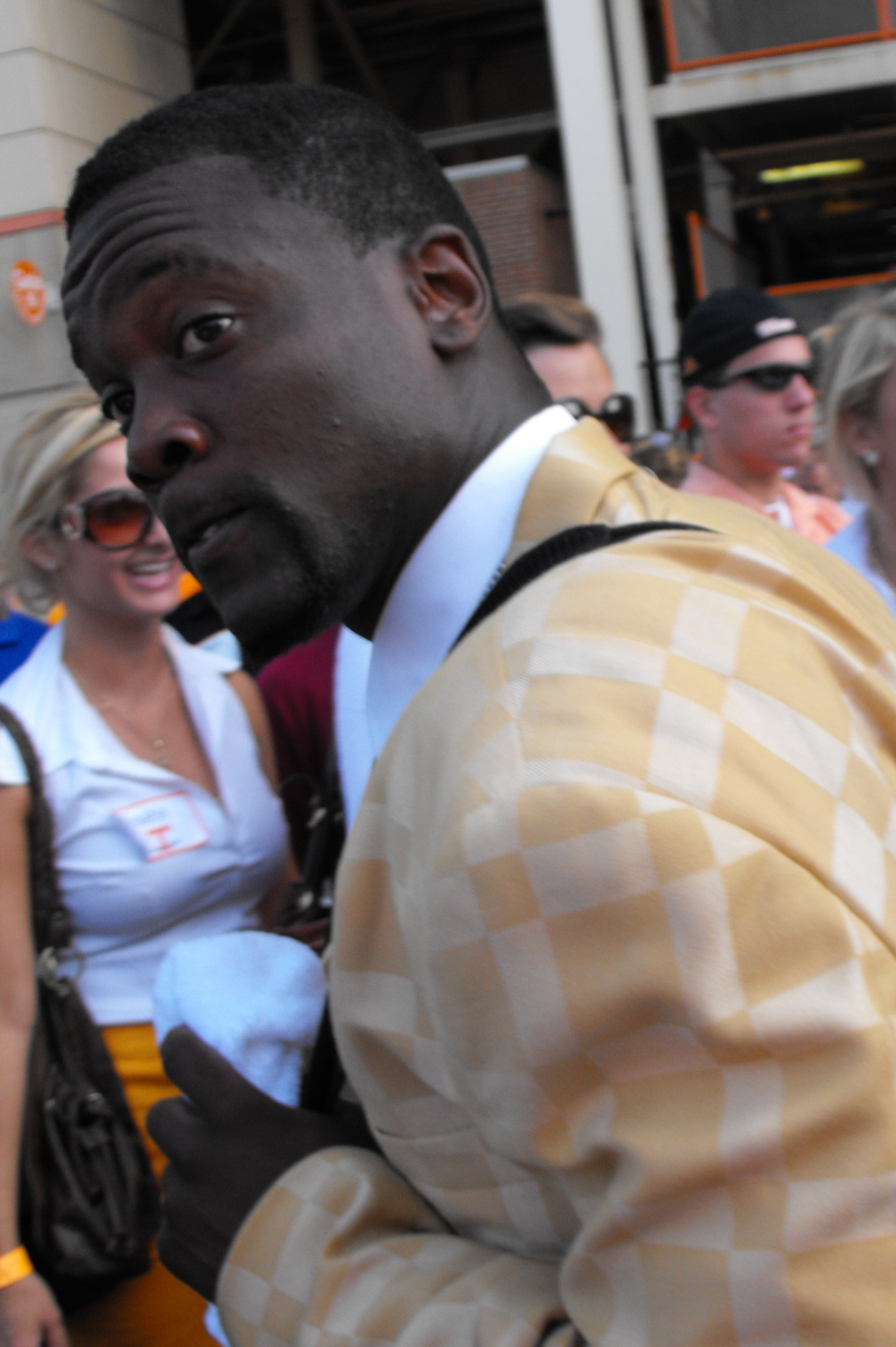

No. 31
- Position: Defensive back

Personal information
- Born: July 23, 1987 (age 39); Nassau, Bahamas, U.S.
- Listed height: 6 ft 0 in (1.83 m)
- Listed weight: 160 lb (73 kg)

Career information
- High school: Miami Killian (Miami, Florida)
- College: Tennessee

Career history
- 2011–2013: Calgary Stampeders
- 2013: Toronto Argonauts
- 2016: Saskatchewan Roughriders
- Stats at CFL.ca

Demetrice Morley (born July 23, 1987) is an American former professional football defensive back who played in the Canadian Football League (CFL). He played college football at Tennessee.

== Early life ==
Morley played football at Miami Killian High School in Miami, Florida. He was a standout star at defensive back, and was ranked by Rivals.com and Scout.com recruiting services at the number one cornerback in the 2005 recruiting class. He also helped Miami Killian to a 6A state championship in 2004. Only championship in school history. Morley was a part of a Tennessee class that was ranked Top 3 nationally, also featuring Jonathan Crompton, LaMarcus Coker, Rico McCoy, Josh McNeil, among others.

== College career ==
=== Freshman season: 2005 ===
Morley played for the Vols as a freshman in 2005, backing up Jason Allen.

=== Sophomore season: 2006 ===
Morley started for the Vols following an injury to Inquoris Johnson in the 2nd game of the season against Air Force. Morley spent the majority of the time as a strong safety. Morley ended the year with 51 total tackles, 2 interceptions and one blocked kick.

=== 2007 ===
Morley was dismissed from the football team and left school for academic reasons following the 2006 season. He spent the 2007 season at Pellissippi State Technical Community College in an attempt to be readmitted at Tennessee.

=== Junior season: 2008 ===
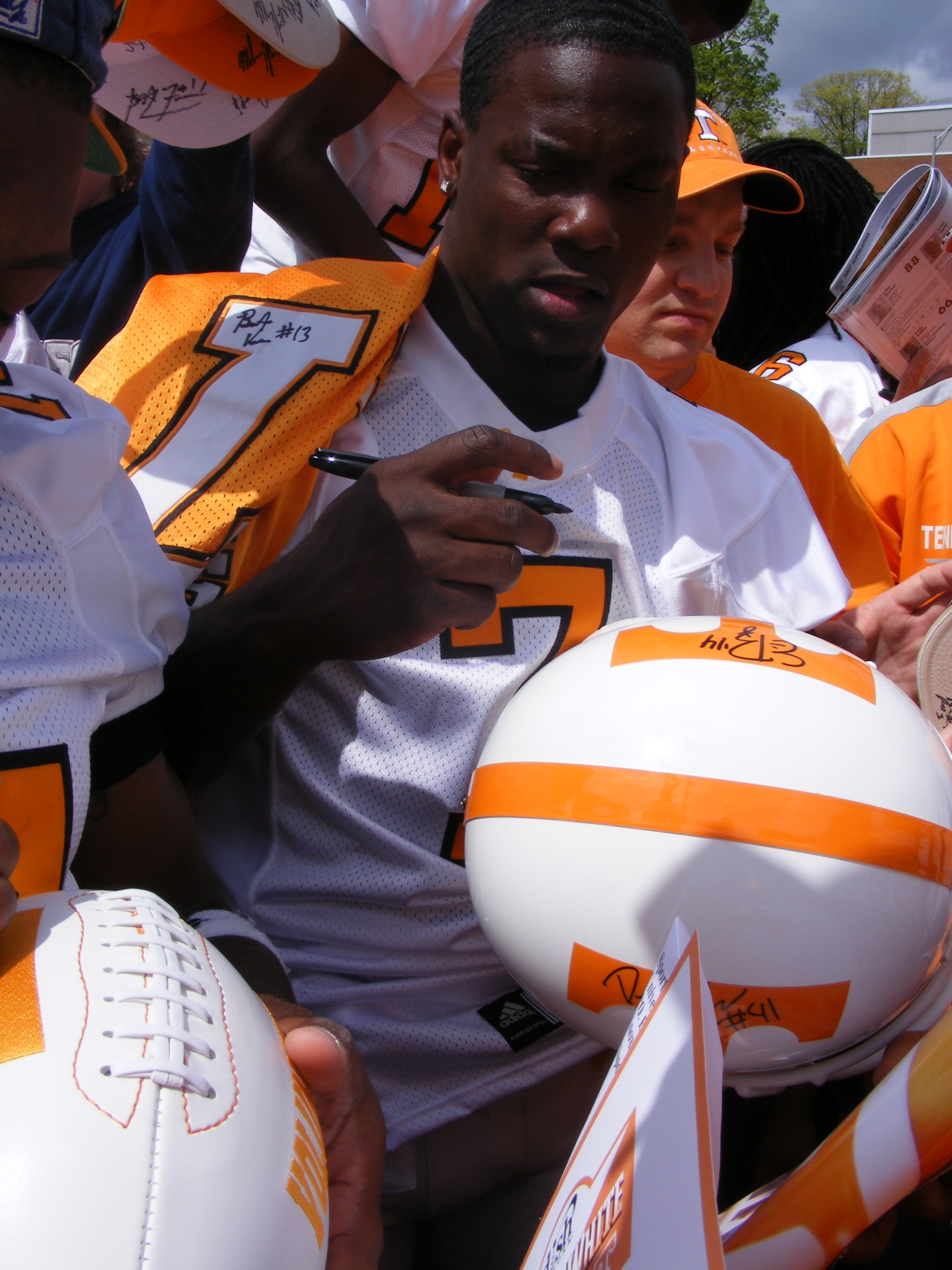
D-Mo

After sitting out the 2007 season, Morley was readmitted to the University in January 2008 and rejoined the team. The birth of his son motivated him to return.

=== Senior season: 2009 ===
On April 7, 2009 Head Coach Lane Kiffin announced that Morley has been dismissed from the squad. He did not state specifically why the rising senior was dismissed, but when Kiffin became head coach in December, Morley entered the supplemental draft.

== Professional football ==
=== Calgary Stampeders ===
In 2011, Morley signed with the Calgary Stampeders of the Canadian Football League (CFL). In his rookie season, Morley played in 16 games, recording 40 tackles and 4 sacks. In 2012, Morley recorded 10 tackles and 1 sack in only 2 games, missing most of the season due to a shoulder injury. In 2013, Morley recorded 13 tackles and 1 interception in 6 games before being released by the Stampeders on September 5, 2013.

In his first-ever appearance, July 14, 2011, Morley forces a fumble that leads to the winning touchdown. He doesn’t stop there. The then-safety ends up pacing the team with four forced fumbles. His four sacks are the most by a Calgary defensive back since David Lee McCrary’s four in 1989. Also, he earns the Stamps’ nomination for the Canadian Football League’s most outstanding defensive player.

=== Toronto Argonauts ===
On September 6, 2013, Morley signed with the Toronto Argonauts of the CFL. On May 16, 2014, Morley was released by the Argonauts because of others transactions by the team.
