= Brandon McRae =

American gridiron football player (born 1986)

No. 83
- Position: Wide receiver

Personal information
- Born: March 5, 1986 (age 40); Boston, Massachusetts
- Listed height: 6 ft 4 in (1.93 m)
- Listed weight: 205 lb (93 kg)

Career information
- High school: Chatham (VA) Hargrave Military
- College: Mississippi State
- NFL draft: 2010: undrafted

Career history
- St. Louis Rams (2010)*; Virginia Destroyers (2011); Georgia Force (2012); Edmonton Eskimos (2014)*
- * Offseason or practice squad member only
- Stats at ArenaFan.com

Brandon McRae (born March 5, 1986) is an American former football wide receiver.

== Early life ==
McRae played at Monacan High School in Richmond, Va. He helped lead the Chiefs to a 9-1 record during his senior season. He also participated in track, as a sprinter. After high school McRae played at Hargrave Military Academy in Chatham, Va. He played defensive back at Hargrave and ran a 4.51 40-yard dash at the Hargrave following the 2004 season and helped lead his prep school team to an 8-3 overall record.

== College career ==
McRae attended Mississippi State University after beginning his collegiate career Morehead State University. In 2009, he recorded 14 receptions for 116 yards and suffered a broken leg that ended his senior season. In 2008, he played in all 12 games during his junior season, starting 10 times and led the team with 51 catches for 518 yards, a 10.2-yard per catch average, and three touchdowns. McRae played in all 13 games of his sophomore season, earning one starting call and made two catches for 50 yards on the season. In 2006, he sat out the season to establish his transfer eligibility.

In 2005 McRae led Morehead State University in receiving as a true freshman with 28 receptions for 361 yards, a 12.9-yard average, and one touchdown.

== Professional career ==
Pre-draft measurables
Height	Weight	40-yard dash	10-yard split	20-yard split	20-yard shuttle	Three-cone drill	Vertical jump	Broad jump	Bench press	Wonderlic
6 ft 3 5/8 in (1.92 m)	208 lb (94 kg)	4.51 s	1.66 s	2.68 s	4.28 s	6.93 s	34 1/2 in (0.88 m)	9 ft 9 in (2.97 m)	13 reps	x
All values from MSU Pro Day.

=== St. Louis Rams ===
McRae signed with the Rams as an undrafted rookie free agent on April 25, 2010. He was waived and then signed to the Rams practice squad on September 4, 2010.

=== Virginia Destroyers ===
McRae was signed by the Virginia Destroyers of the United Football League on June 14, 2011.
