= Ben Olson =

American football player (born 1983)

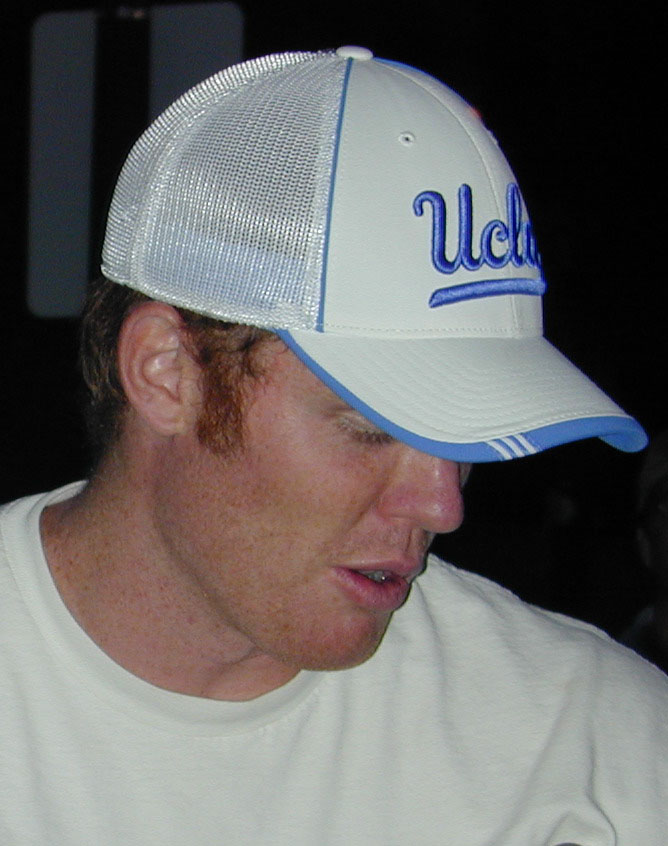
- Olson in August 2008

Profile
- Position: Quarterback

Personal information
- Born: February 28, 1983 (age 43); Missoula, Montana, U.S.
- Listed height: 6 ft 5 in (1.96 m)
- Listed weight: 232 lb (105 kg)

Career information
- High school: Thousand Oaks (CA)
- College: UCLA
- NFL draft: 2009: undrafted

Benjamin James Olson (born February 28, 1983) is an American former football college quarterback. He played four injury-plagued seasons of college football at UCLA, starting 10 games (and appearing in four others).

== Early life ==
Born in Missoula, Montana, Olson grew up in Thousand Oaks, California, where he played quarterback for Thousand Oaks High School in California for four years. For three of those years, he played on the varsity team, alongside David Anderson.

Olson was considered the top quarterback prospect, following a highly productive senior year in which he threw for 2,989 yards and 32 touchdowns, earning high school All-American honors in 2001.

== College career ==
Upon graduation in 2002, Olson signed with Brigham Young University and redshirted his freshman season. He then went on a two-year mission to Canada with the LDS Church.

In 2005 Olson transferred to UCLA, where he spent the year behind senior Drew Olson (no relation) on the depth chart after missing the opener with a fractured hand.

Olson played in five games in 2006, completing 63.7% of his passes for 822 yards, 6.63 yards per attempt, 5 TDs and 5 INTs. His season came to an end in the opening moments of his fifth start, when he tore a ligament. He did not regain the starting position that season.

Olson was named starting quarterback for the 2007 season following the spring training. However, he was again plagued by injuries and only played in 6 games, completing only 48.3% of his passes for 1040 yards, 7.08 yards per attempt, 7 TDs and 6 INTs.

Entering the 2008 season, Olson was the presumptive starting quarterback after a career-ending knee injury to Patrick Cowan, the named starter during spring practice. However, on Saturday, August 9, Olson broke his right foot and was sidelined. X-rays taken the following day revealed the fracture, a repeat of an injury he had suffered during spring practice. The foot took longer than expected to heal and he finished his college football career without playing a game that year.

== Post-collegiate career ==
After graduating from UCLA in 2008, Olson was invited to try out by the Philadelphia Eagles, but again broke his foot. He went un-drafted in the 2009 NFL draft.

== Personal ==
Ben is the son of Rick and Annie Olson and has one brother and three sisters. He married Andrea Anderson in May 2007.
