= 2008 Nevada Wolf Pack football team =

American college football season

2008 Nevada Wolf Pack football

Humanitarian Bowl, L 35–42 vs. Maryland
- Conference: Western Athletic Conference
- Record: 7–6 (5–3 WAC)
- Head coach: Chris Ault (24th season)
- Offensive coordinator: Chris Klenakis (8th season)
- Offensive scheme: Pistol
- Defensive coordinator: Nigel Burton (1st season)
- Base defense: 3–4
- Home stadium: Mackay Stadium

2008 Western Athletic Conference football standings
	Conf.			Overall
Team	W		L	W		L
No. 11 Boise State $	8	–	0	12	–	1
Louisiana Tech	5	–	3	8	–	5
Nevada	5	–	3	7	–	6
Hawaii	5	–	3	7	–	7
Fresno State	4	–	4	7	–	6
San Jose State	4	–	4	6	–	6
Utah State	3	–	5	3	–	9
New Mexico State	1	–	7	3	–	9
Idaho	1	–	7	2	–	10
$ – Conference champion; Rankings from AP Poll

The 2008 Nevada Wolf Pack football team represented the University of Nevada, Reno during the 2008 NCAA Division I FBS football season. Nevada competed as a member of the Western Athletic Conference (WAC). The Wolf Pack were led by Chris Ault in his 24th overall and 5th straight season since taking over as head coach for the third time in 2004. They played their home games at Mackay Stadium.

Nevada utilized Ault's own creation, the "Pistol" offense. The offense was directed by offensive coordinator Chris Klenakis in his 15th overall and 8th straight season and defense was led by first–year defensive coordinator Nigel Burton.

Nevada finished the regular season with a 7–5 mark and 5–3 in WAC play, which resulted in a three-way tie for second-place in the conference. Hawaii and Louisiana Tech both likewise finished with 5–3 conference records. During the season, the Wolf Pack played three ranked teams: Texas Tech, Missouri and Boise State. Nevada lost each game, but gave Boise State its closest contest in conference play, losing by seven points. Nevada, however, suffered a setback when they lost to New Mexico State, who were called by one publication the "perennial WAC bottom feeders".

Quarterback Colin Kaepernick was named 2008 WAC Offensive Player of the Year. During the regular season, he passed for 2,479 yards and 19 touchdowns and rushed for 1,115 yards and 16 touchdowns. He was aided by running back Vai Taua, who ran for 1,420 yards and 14 touchdowns. It was the first time in school history that Nevada had two 1,000 yard rushers on the team simultaneously.

Nevada secured its fourth straight bowl game appearance and faced Maryland in the 2008 Humanitarian Bowl. The Wolf Pack lost in a high–scoring and record–setting game by 35 to 42.

== Schedule ==
Date	Time	Opponent	Site	TV	Result	Attendance
August 30	6:00 p.m.	Grambling State*	Mackay Stadium; Reno, NV		W 49–13	22,772
September 6	6:00 p.m.	No. 12 Texas Tech*	Mackay Stadium; Reno, NV		L 19–35	24,453
September 13	9:30 a.m.	at No. 6 Missouri*	Faurot Field; Columbia, MO	CSNBA/FSN	L 17–69	54,202
September 27	7:00 p.m.	at UNLV*	Sam Boyd Stadium; Whitney, NV (Fremont Cannon)	MWSN	W 49–27	33,078
October 4	2:00 p.m.	at Idaho	Kibbie Dome; Moscow, ID	KAME-TV/CSNCA	W 49–14	15,013
October 11	1:00 p.m.	New Mexico State	Mackay Stadium; Reno, NV	ESPNGP	L 45–48	12,475
October 18	1:00 p.m.	Utah State^{†}	Mackay Stadium; Reno, NV		W 44–17	13,159
October 25	9:00 p.m.	at Hawaii	Aloha Stadium; Halawa, HI	KAME-TV/CSNCA/Oceanic PPV	L 31–38	40,225
November 7	6:00 p.m.	at Fresno State	Bulldog Stadium; Fresno, CA	ESPN2	W 41–28	33,207
November 15	1:00 p.m.	San Jose State	Mackay Stadium; Reno, NV		W 41–17	14,343
November 22	1:00 p.m.	No. 9 Boise State	Mackay Stadium; Reno, NV (rivalry)	ESPN2	L 34–41	27,057
November 29	11:30 a.m.	at Louisiana Tech	Joe Aillet Stadium; Ruston, LA	ESPNGP	W 35–31	17,254
December 30	1:30 p.m.	vs. Maryland*	Bronco Stadium; Boise, ID (Humanitarian Bowl)	ESPN	L 35–42	26,781
*Non-conference game; ^{†}Homecoming; Rankings from AP Poll released prior to the game; All times are in Pacific time

== Game summaries ==
=== Grambling State ===
Grambling State at Nevada

Team	1	2	3	4	Total
Tigers	0	0	7	6	13
• Wolf Pack	14	7	14	14	49

- Date: August 30, 2008
- Location: Mackay Stadium
  Reno, NV
- Game start: 6:05 p.m. PDT
- Elapsed time: 3 hours and 18 minutes
- Game attendance: 22,772
- Game weather: Temperature: 86 °F (30 °C) • Weather: Clear and Windy • Wind: 20 MPH
- Referee: Pete Gautreau
- TV announcers (None): None

Scoring summary
1	12:54	NEV	Colin Kaepernick 7–yard run (Brett Jaekle kick)	NEV 7–0
1	03:12	NEV	Colin Kaepernick 19–yard run (Brett Jaekle kick)	NEV 14–0
2	06:55	NEV	Vai Taua 1–yard run (Brett Jaekle kick)	NEV 21–0
3	11:23	NEV	Vai Taua 4–yard run (Brett Jaekle kick)	NEV 28–0
3	09:19	GSU	Desmond Lenard 61–yard interception (Luis Leal kick)	NEV 28–7
3	06:29	NEV	Colin Kaepernick 28–yard run (Brett Jaekle kick)	NEV 35–7
4	13:32	NEV	Luke Lippincott 4–yard run (Brett Jaekle kick)	NEV 42–7
4	07:10	NEV	Brandon Fragger 31–yard (Brett Jaekle kick)	NEV 49–7
4	04:38	GSU	Kenneth Batiste 21–yard pass from Greg Dillon (Luis Leal kick failed)	NEV 49–13

=== Texas Tech ===
Texas Tech at Nevada

Team	1	2	3	4	Total
• No. 12 Red Raiders	7	7	7	14	35
Wolf Pack	3	6	3	7	19

- Date: September 6, 2008
- Location: Mackay Stadium
  Reno, NV
- Game start: 6:05 p.m. PDT
- Elapsed time: 3 hours and 22 minutes
- Game attendance: 24,453
- Game weather: Temperature: 91 °F (33 °C) • Weather: Clear • Wind: NW 6 MPH
- Referee: Jon Bible
- TV announcers (None): None

Scoring summary
1	10:31	NEV	Brett Jaekle 27–yard field goal	NEV 3–0
1	07:51	TTU	Eric Morris 86–yard punt return (Donnie Carona kick)	TTU 7–3
2	07:24	NEV	Brett Jaekle 26–yard field goal	TTU 7–6
2	05:18	TTU	Shannon Woods 1–yard run (Donnie Carona kick)	TTU 14–6
2	00:00	NEV	Brett Jaekle 43–yard field goal	TTU 14–9
3	06:40	NEV	Brett Jaekle 31–yard field goal	TTU 14–12
3	05:20	TTU	Eric Morris 13–yard run (Donnie Carona kick)	TTU 21–12
4	11:34	TTU	Michael Crabtree 82–yard pass from Graham Harrell (Donnie Carona kick)	TTU 28–12
4	10:30	NEV	Marko Mitchell 48–yard pass from Colin Kaepernick (Brett Jaekle kick)	TTU 28–19
4	06:18	TTU	Shannon Woods 21–yard run (Donnie Carona kick)	TTU 35–19

=== At Missouri ===
Nevada at Missouri

Team	1	2	3	4	Total
Wolf Pack	7	10	0	0	17
• No. 6 Tigers	17	21	21	10	69

- Date: September 13, 2008
- Location: Faurot Field
  Columbia, MO
- Game start: 11:40 a.m. CDT
- Elapsed time: 3 hours and 26 minutes
- Game attendance: 54,202
- Game weather: Temperature: 75 °F (24 °C) • Weather: Cloudy, Rainy and Gusty • Wind: S 12 MPH
- Referee: Daniel Romeo
- TV announcers (CSNBA/FSN): N/A

Scoring summary
1	13:49	MU	Derrick Washington 59–yard run (Jeff Wolfert kick)	MU 7–0
1	12:02	MU	Jeremy Maclin 80–yard pass from Chase Daniel (Jeff Wolfert kick)	MU 14–0
1	07:35	NEV	Colin Kaepernick 1–yard run (Brett Jaekle kick)	MU 14–7
1	02:28	MU	Jeff Wolfert 27–yard field goal	MU 17–7
2	13:56	MU	Jared Perry 27–yard pass from Chase Daniel (Jeff Wolfert kick)	MU 24–7
2	05:43	NEV	Brett Jaekle 31–yard field goal	MU 24–10
2	03:45	MU	Derrick Washington 2–yard run (Jeff Wolfert kick)	MU 31–10
2	01:31	MU	Jeremy Maclin 14–yard pass from Chase Daniel (Jeff Wolfert kick)	MU 38–10
2	00:00	NEV	Marko Mitchell 42–yard pass from Colin Kaepernick (Brett Jaekle kick)	MU 38–17
3	12:32	MU	Jeremy Maclin 49–yard pass from Chase Daniel (Jeff Wolfert kick)	MU 45–17
3	08:13	MU	Chase Coffman 32–yard pass from Tommy Saunders (Jeff Wolfert kick)	MU 52–17
3	02:55	MU	Chase Patton 3–yard run (Jeff Wolfert kick)	MU 59–17
4	14:57	MU	Jeff Wolfert 24–yard field goal	MU 62–17
4	04:54	MU	Jeff Gettys 27–yard interception (Jeff Wolfert kick)	MU 69–17

=== At UNLV ===
Nevada at UNLV
(Battle for the Fremont Cannon)

Team	1	2	3	4	Total
• Wolf Pack	7	21	7	14	49
Rebels	17	3	7	0	27

- Date: September 27, 2008
- Location: Sam Boyd Stadium
  Whitney, NV
- Game start: 7:06 p.m. PDT
- Elapsed time: 3 hours and 20 minutes
- Game attendance: 33,078
- Game weather: Temperature: 95 °F (35 °C) • Weather: Partly Cloudy • Wind: NW 5 MPH
- Referee: Clair Gausman
- TV announcers (MWSN): James Bates, Todd Christensen and Molly Sullivan (sideline)

Scoring summary
1	13:01	UNLV	Ben Jaekle 47–yard field goal	UNLV 3–0
1	09:56	UNLV	Phillip Payne 7–yard pass from Omar Clayton (Kyle Watson kick)	UNLV 10–0
1	06:58	NEV	Chris Wellington 70–yard pass from Colin Kaepernick (Brett Jaekle kick)	UNLV 10–7
1	05:12	UNLV	Casey Flair 41–yard pass from Omar Clayton (Kyle Watson kick)	UNLV 17–7
2	13:43	NEV	Colin Kaepernick 4–yard run (Brett Jaekle kick)	UNLV 17–14
2	12:49	NEV	Virgil Green 40–yard pass from Colin Kaepernick (Brett Jaekle kick)	NEV 21–17
2	06:33	NEV	Courtney Randall 7–yard run (Brett Jaekle kick)	NEV 28–17
2	00:43	UNLV	Ben Jaekle 52–yard field goal	NEV 28–20
3	14:42	NEV	Colin Kaepernick 66–yard run (Brett Jaekle kick)	NEV 35–20
3	07:25	UNLV	Ryan Wolfe 7–yard pass from Omar Clayton (Ben Jaekle kick)	NEV 35–27
4	11:37	NEV	Vai Taua 4–yard run (Brett Jaekle kick)	NEV 42–27
4	08:41	NEV	Colin Kaepernick 28–yard run (Brett Jaekle kick)	NEV 49–27

=== At Idaho ===
Nevada at Idaho

Team	1	2	3	4	Total
• Wolf Pack	7	14	7	21	49
Vandals	0	0	7	7	14

- Date: October 4, 2008
- Location: Kibbie Dome
  Moscow, ID
- Game start: 2:07 p.m. PDT
- Elapsed time: 3 hours and 20 minutes
- Game attendance: 15,013
- Game weather: Indoors
- Referee: Terry Leyden
- TV announcers (KAME-TV/CSNCA): Bob Akamian and Scott Gordon

Scoring summary
1	07:03	NEV	Vai Taua 3–yard run (Brett Jaekle kick)	NEV 7–0
2	14:00	NEV	Vai Taua 1–yard run (Brett Jaekle kick)	NEV 14–0
2	06:32	NEV	Colin Kaepernick 18–yard run (Brett Jaekle kick)	NEV 21–0
3	07:50	NEV	Marko Mitchell 48–yard pass from Colin Kaepernick (Brett Jaekle kick)	NEV 28–0
3	06:04	IDAHO	Eddie Williams 10–yard pass from Nathan Enderle (Tino Amancio kick)	NEV 28–7
4	14:37	NEV	Chris Wellington 10–yard pass from Colin Kaepernick (Brett Jaekle kick)	NEV 35–7
4	09:31	NEV	Vai Taua 3–yard run (Brett Jaekle kick)	NEV 42–7
4	05:59	IDAHO	Eddie Williams 12–yard pass from Nathan Enderle (Tino Amanico kick)	NEV 42–14
4	05:35	NEV	Courtney Randall 1–yard run (Brett Jaekle kick)	NEV 49–14

=== New Mexico State ===
New Mexico State at Nevada

Team	1	2	3	4	Total
• Aggies	7	14	17	10	48
Wolf Pack	10	14	14	7	45

- Date: October 11, 2008
- Location: Mackay Stadium
  Reno, NV
- Game start: 1:05 p.m. PDT
- Elapsed time: 3 hours and 31 minutes
- Game attendance: 12,475
- Game weather: Temperature: 44 °F (7 °C) • Weather: Mostly Sunny • Wind: NW 19 MPH
- Referee: Rich Kollen
- TV announcers (ESPNGP): N/A

Scoring summary
1	12:50	NEV	Colin Kaepernick 32–yard run (Brett Jaekle kick)	NEV 7–0
1	07:17	NMSU	Marque Colston 3–yard run (Kyle Hughes kick)	TIE 7–7
1	01:21	NEV	Brett Jaekle 41–yard field goal	NEV 10–7
2	13:40	NMSU	Wes Neiman 14–yard pass from Chase Holbrook (Kyle Hughes kick)	NMSU 14–10
2	09:59	NEV	Vai Taua 8–yard run (Brett Jaekle kick)	NEV 17–14
2	06:30	NMSU	Marque Colston 17–yard pass from Chase Holbrook (Kyle Hughes kick)	NMSU 21–17
2	02:43	NEV	Vai Taua 3–yard run (Brett Jaekle kick)	NEV 24–21
3	12:35	NMSU	Chase Holbrook 2–yard run (Kyle Hughes kick)	NMSU 28–24
3	09:46	NEV	Vai Taua 5–yard pass from Colin Kaepernick (Brett Jaekle kick)	NEV 31–28
3	07:04	NMSU	Kyle Hughes 29–yard field goal	TIE 31–31
3	05:20	NMSU	Oren Long 83–yard fumble recovery (Kyle Hughes kick)	NMSU 38–31
3	00:51	NEV	Vai Taua 16–yard pass from Colin Kaepernick (Brett Jaekle kick)	TIE 38–38
4	13:38	NMSU	Marcus Anderson 7–yard pass from Chase Holbrook (Kyle Hughes kick)	NMSU 45–38
4	06:27	NMSU	Kyle Hughes 18–yard field goal	NSMU 48–38
4	03:51	NEV	Chris Wellington 19–yard pass from Colin Kaepernick (Brett Jaekle kick)	NSMU 48–45

=== Utah State ===
Utah State at Nevada

Team	1	2	3	4	Total
Aggies	0	7	3	7	17
• Wolf Pack	6	14	10	14	44

- Date: October 18, 2008
- Location: Mackay Stadium
  Reno, NV
- Game start: 1:05 p.m. PDT
- Elapsed time: 3 hours and 28 minutes
- Game attendance: 13,159
- Game weather: Temperature: 69 °F (21 °C) • Weather: Cloudy with Possible Rain • Wind: NW 10 MPH
- Referee: Frank White
- TV announcers (None): None

Scoring summary
1	06:25	NEV	Vai Taua 26–yard run (Team rush fumbled)	NEV 6–0
2	13:38	NEV	Colin Kaepernick 19–yard run (Brett Jaekle kick)	NEV 13–0
2	02:27	USU	Otis Nelson 16–yard pass from Diondre Borel (Peter Caldwell kick)	NEV 13–7
2	01:06	NEV	Mike McCoy 10–yard run (Brett Jaekle kick)	NEV 20–7
3	08:11	NEV	Brett Jaekle 26–yard field goal	NEV 23–7
3	05:54	NEV	Marko Mitchell 75–yard pass from Colin Kaepernick (Brett Jaekle kick)	NEV 30–7
3	02:57	USU	Chris Ulinski 42–yard field goal	NEV 30–10
4	10:45	NEV	Colin Kaepernick 1–yard run (Brett Jaekle kick)	NEV 37–10
4	09:48	USU	Otis Nelson 52–yard pass from Diondre Borel (Peter Caldwell kick)	NEV 37–17
4	01:44	NEV	Jared Silva-Purcell 47–yard interception (Brett Jaekle kick)	NEV 44–17

=== At Hawaii ===
Nevada at Hawaii

Team	1	2	3	4	Total
Wolf Pack	7	3	7	14	31
• Warriors	7	7	10	14	38

- Date: October 25, 2008
- Location: Aloha Stadium
  Halawa, HI
- Game start: 6:07 p.m.
- Elapsed time: 3 hours and 23 minutes
- Game attendance: 40,225
- Game weather: Temperature: 77 °F (25 °C) • Weather: Rain and 87% Humidity • Wind: SW 8 MPH
- Referee: Gerald Wright
- TV announcers (KAME-TV/CSNCA/Oceanic PPV): Bob Akamian and Scott Gordon of KAME-TV/CSNCA and Jim Leahey and Russell Yamanoha of Oceanic PPV

Scoring summary
1	09:36	UH	John Fonoti 9–yard fumble recovery (Dan Kelly kick)	UH 7–0
1	08:08	NEV	Colin Kaepernick 61–yard run (Brett Jaekle kick)	TIE 7–7
2	13:06	UH	Mike Washington 26–yard pass from John Fonoti (Dan Kelly kick)	UH 14–7
2	02:39	NEV	Brett Jaekle 32–yard field goal	UH 14–10
3	09:21	UH	Dan Kelly 41–yard field goal	UH 17–10
3	09:00	NEV	Vai Taua 79–yard run (Brett Jaekle kick)	TIE 17–17
3	07:08	UH	David Farmer 9–yard run (Dan Kelly kick)	UH 24–17
4	14:54	UH	Mike Washington 16–yard pass from Greg Alexander (Dan Kelly kick)	UH 31–17
4	10:29	NEV	Marko Mitchell 5–yard pass from Colin Kaepernick (Brett Jaekle kick)	UH 31–24
4	01:31	NEV	Chris Wellington 34–yard pass from Colin Kaepernick (Brett Jaekle kick)	TIE 31–31
4	00:20	UH	Malcolm Lane 24–yard pass from Greg Alexander (Dan Kelly kick)	UH 38–31

=== At Fresno State ===
Nevada at Fresno State

Team	1	2	3	4	Total
• Wolf Pack	7	10	14	10	41
Bulldogs	7	0	14	7	28

- Date: November 7, 2008
- Location: Bulldog Stadium
  Fresno, CA
- Game start: 6:06 p.m. PST
- Elapsed time: 3 hours and 36 minutes
- Game attendance: 33,207
- Game weather: Temperature: 63 °F (17 °C) • Weather: Clear • Wind: WNW 5 MPH
- Referee: Greg Burks
- TV announcers (ESPN2): Joe Tessitore and Rod Gilmore

Scoring summary
1	06:02	NEV	Colin Kaepernick 16–yard run (Brett Jaekle kick)	NEV 7–0
1	01:05	FS	Seyi Ajirotutu 23–yard pass from Tom Brandstater (Kevin Goessling kick)	TIE 7–7
2	12:49	NEV	Mike McCoy 36–yard pass from Colin Kaepernick (Brett Jaekle kick)	NEV 14–7
2	04:54	NEV	Brett Jaekle 34–yard field goal	NEV 17–7
3	09:08	FS	Lonyae Miller 34–yard run (Kevin Goessling kick)	NEV 17–14
3	03:16	NEV	Colin Kaepernick 2–yard run (Brett Jaekle kick)	NEV 24–14
3	01:38	NEV	Courtney Randall 15–yard run (Brett Jaekle kick)	NEV 31–14
3	00:00	FS	Seyi Ajirotutu 3–yard pass from Tom Brandstater (Kevin Goessling kick)	NEV 31–21
4	08:40	NEV	Vai Taua 25–yard run (Brett Jaekle kick)	NEV 38–21
4	08:28	FS	A. J. Jefferson 92–yard kickoff return (Kevin Goessling kick)	NEV 38–28
4	02:23	NEV	Brett Jaekle 20–yard field goal	NEV 41–28

=== San Jose State ===
San Jose State at Nevada

Team	1	2	3	4	Total
Spartans	0	3	14	0	17
• Wolf Pack	3	14	14	10	41

- Date: November 15, 2008
- Location: Mackay Stadium
  Reno, NV
- Game start: 1:05 p.m. PST
- Elapsed time: 3 hours and 17 minutes
- Game attendance: 14,343
- Game weather: Temperature: 56 °F (13 °C) • Weather: Clear • Wind: SE 3 MPH
- Referee: Land Clark
- TV announcers (None): None

Scoring summary
1	06:03	NEV	Brett Jaekle 35–yard field goal	NEV 3–0
2	06:12	NEV	Colin Kaepernick 7–yard run (Brett Jaekle kick)	NEV 10–0
2	01:02	NEV	Vai Taua 57–yard run (Brett Jaekle kick)	NEV 17–0
2	00:22	SJSU	Jared Strubeck 44–yard field goal	NEV 17–3
3	12:16	NEV	Courtney Randall 5–yard run (Brett Jaekle kick)	NEV 24–3
3	11:32	SJSU	David Richmond 11–yard pass from Kyle Reed (Jared Strubeck kick)	NEV 24–10
3	05:58	NEV	Marko Mitchell 31–yard pass from Colin Kaepernick (Brett Jaekle kick)	NEV 31–10
3	05:14	SJSU	David Richmond 10–yard pass from Kyle Reed (Jared Strubeck kick)	NEV 31–17
4	12:51	NEV	Brett Jaekle 33–yard field goal	NEV 34–17
4	07:12	NEV	Colin Kaepernick 6–yard run (Brett Jaekle kick)	NEV 41–17

=== Boise State ===
Boise State at Nevada
(rivalry)

Team	1	2	3	4	Total
• No. 9 Broncos	14	10	7	10	41
Wolf Pack	0	3	21	10	34

- Date: November 22, 2008
- Location: Mackay Stadium
  Reno, NV
- Game start: 1:07 p.m. PST
- Elapsed time: 3 hours and 43 minutes
- Game attendance: 27,057
- Game weather: Temperature: 49 °F (9 °C) • Weather: Broken Clouds • Wind: S 3 MPH
- Referee: Pete Gautreau
- TV announcers (ESPN2): Mark Johnson, Tom Scott and David Augusto (sideline)

Scoring summary
1	07:05	BSU	Richie Brockel 16–yard pass from Kellen Moore (Kyle Brotzman kick)	BSU 7–0
1	03:15	BSU	Vinny Perretta 3–yard run (Kyle Brotzman kick)	BSU 14–0
2	13:36	NEV	Brett Jaekle 25–yard field goal	BSU 14–3
2	06:22	BSU	Kyle Brotzman 34–yard field goal	BSU 17–3
2	02:06	BSU	Austin Pettis 18–yard pass from Kellen Moore (Kyle Brotzman kick)	BSU 24–3
3	10:00	NEV	Jerome Johnson 28–yard interception (Brett Jaekle kick)	BSU 24–10
3	08:48	BSU	Ian Johnson 66–yard run (Kyle Brotzman kick)	BSU 31–10
3	06:24	NEV	Vai Taua 31–yard run (Brett Jaekle kick)	BSU 31–17
3	05:14	NEV	Josh Mauga 46–yard interception (Brett Jaekle kick)	BSU 31–24
4	10:11	BSU	Austin Pettis 10–yard pass from Kellen Moore (Kyle Brotzman kick)	BSU 38–24
4	07:20	BSU	Kyle Brotzman 50–yard field goal	BSU 41–24
4	04:36	NEV	Marko Mitchell 9–yard pass from Colin Kaepernick (Brett Jaekle kick)	BSU 41–31
4	02:36	NEV	Brett Jaekle 25–yard field goal	BSU 41–34

=== At Louisiana Tech ===
Nevada at Louisiana Tech

Team	1	2	3	4	Total
• Wolf Pack	0	7	14	14	35
Bulldogs	7	10	14	0	31

- Date: November 29, 2008
- Location: Joe Aillet Stadium
  Ruston, LA
- Game start: 1:36 p.m. CST
- Elapsed time: 3 hours and 24 minutes
- Game attendance: 17,254
- Game weather: Temperature: 55 °F (13 °C) • Weather: Overcast • Wind: 5–10 MPH
- Referee: Bill McCabe
- TV announcers (ESPNGP): N/A

Scoring summary
1	06:34	LATECH	Shane Womack 26–yard pass from Ross Jenkins (Brad Oestriecher kick)	LATECH 7–0
2	13:21	NEV	Chris Wellington 9–yard pass from Colin Kaepernick (Brett Jaekle kick)	TIE 7–7
2	12:19	LATECH	Daniel Porter 20–yard run (Brad Oestriecher kick)	LATECH 14–7
2	04:26	LATECH	Brad Oestriecher 22–yard field goal	LATECH 17–7
3	12:06	NEV	Marko Mitchell 62–yard pass from Colin Kaepernick (Brett Jaekle kick)	LATECH 17–14
3	11:27	LATECH	Phillip Livas 44–yard pass from Ross Jenkins (Brad Oestriecher kick)	LATECH 24–14
3	04:48	LATECH	Patrick Jackson 4–yard run (Brad Oestriecher kick)	LATECH 31–14
3	01:26	NEV	Marko Mitchell 18–yard pass from Colin Kaepernick (Brett Jaekle kick)	LATECH 31–21
4	11:42	NEV	Mike McCoy 27–yard pass from Colin Kaepernick (Brett Jaekle kick)	LATECH 31–28
4	03:15	NEV	Vai Taua 22–yard run (Brett Jaekle kick)	NEV 35–31

=== Vs. Maryland ===
Nevada vs. Maryland
(Humanitarian Bowl)

Team	1	2	3	4	Total
• Terrapins	13	15	0	14	42
Wolf Pack	14	0	7	14	35

- Date: December 30, 2008
- Location: Bronco Stadium
  Boise, ID
- Game start: 2:30 p.m. MST
- Elapsed time: 3 hours and 46 minutes
- Game attendance: 26,781
- Game weather: Temperature: 38 °F (3 °C) • Weather: Cloudy • Wind: SE 8 MPH
- Referee: Clair Gausman
- TV announcers (ESPN): Bob Wischusen, Brock Huard and Heather Cox (sideline)

Scoring summary
1	13:59	MD	Adrian Cannon 59–yard pass from Chris Turner (Obi Egekeze kick failed)	MD 6–0
1	08:06	NEV	Chris Wellington 1–yard pass from Colin Kaepernick (Brett Jaekle kick)	NEV 7–6
1	07:53	MD	Torrey Smith 99–yard kickoff return (Obi Egekeze kick)	MD 13–7
1	00:46	NEV	Vai Taua 17–yard run (Brett Jaekle kick)	NEV 14–13
2	14:50	MD	Morgan Green 53–yard run (Obi Egekeze kick)	MD 20–14
2	00:06	MD	Ronnie Tyler 14–yard pass from Chris Turner (Davin Meggett pass)	MD 28–14
3	05:58	NEV	Vai Taua 17–yard pass from Colin Kaepernick (Brett Jaekle kick)	MD 28–21
4	14:13	NEV	Marko Mitchell 21–yard pass from Colin Kaepernick (Brett Jakle kick)	TIE 28–28
4	12:21	MD	Da'Rel Scott 49–yard run (Obi Egekezke kick)	MD 35–28
4	07:44	MD	Da'Rel Scott 2–yard run (Obi Egekezke kick)	MD 42–28
4	02:19	NEV	Colin Kaepernick 15–yard run (Brett Jaekle kick)	MD 42–35
