= 2008 New Mexico State Aggies football team =

American college football season

2008 New Mexico State Aggies football
- Conference: Western Athletic Conference
- Record: 3–9 (1–7 WAC)
- Head coach: Hal Mumme (4th season)
- Co-offensive coordinators: Gary Goff (4th season); Matt Mumme (4th season)
- Offensive scheme: Air raid
- Defensive coordinator: Joe Lee Dunn (1st season)
- Base defense: 3–3–5
- Home stadium: Aggie Memorial Stadium

2008 Western Athletic Conference football standings
	Conf.			Overall
Team	W		L	W		L
No. 11 Boise State $	8	–	0	12	–	1
Louisiana Tech	5	–	3	8	–	5
Nevada	5	–	3	7	–	6
Hawaii	5	–	3	7	–	7
Fresno State	4	–	4	7	–	6
San Jose State	4	–	4	6	–	6
Utah State	3	–	5	3	–	9
New Mexico State	1	–	7	3	–	9
Idaho	1	–	7	2	–	10
$ – Conference champion; Rankings from AP Poll

The 2008 New Mexico State Aggies football team represented New Mexico State University as members of the Western Athletic Conference (WAC) in the 2008 NCAA Division I FBS football season. The Aggies were led by fourth year head coach Hal Mumme who was fired after the end of the season and played their home games at Aggie Memorial Stadium. They finished the season 3–9 overall and 1–7 in WAC play to tied for eighth place.

== Schedule ==
Date	Time	Opponent	Site	TV	Result	Attendance
September 4	6:00 p.m.	Nicholls State*	Aggie Memorial Stadium; Las Cruces, NM		Cancelled	
September 13	5:00 pm	at Nebraska*	Memorial Stadium; Lincoln, NE	PPV	L 7–38	84,821
September 20	7:00 pm	at UTEP*	Sun Bowl; El Paso, TX (Battle of I-10)		W 34–33	42,930
September 27	6:00 pm	New Mexico*	Aggie Memorial Stadium; Las Cruces, NM (Rio Grande Rivalry)	CN10	L 24–35	30,343
October 4	11:30 am	Alcorn State*	Aggie Memorial Stadium; Las Cruces, NM		W 45–10	11,374
October 11	2:00 pm	at Nevada	Mackay Stadium; Reno, NV	AV	W 48–45	12,475
October 18	6:00 pm	San Jose State	Aggie Memorial Stadium; Las Cruces, NM	AV	L 14–31	20,607
October 25	3:00 pm	at Idaho	Kibbie Dome; Moscow, ID		L 14–20	15,010
November 1	5:00 pm	No. 11 Boise State^{†}	Aggie Memorial Stadium; Las Cruces, NM	AV	L 0–49	15,922
November 8	2:00 pm	Hawaii	Aggie Memorial Stadium; Las Cruces, NM	AV	L 30–42	10,861
November 15	3:00 pm	at Fresno State	Bulldog Stadium; Fresno, CA	AV	L 17–24	36,137
November 22	2:00 pm	Louisiana Tech	Aggie Memorial Stadium; Las Cruces, NM	ESPN Plus	L 31–35	17,426
November 29	1:00 pm	at Utah State	Romney Stadium; Logan, UT	AV	L 2–47	9,919
*Non-conference game; ^{†}Homecoming; Rankings from AP Poll released prior to the game; All times are in Mountain time

The game against Nicholls State was cancelled due to Hurricane Gustav.

== Game summaries ==
=== At Nebraska ===
	1	2	3	4	Total
Aggies	0	0	0	7	7
Cornhuskers	7	14	14	3	38

Statistics	NMSU	NEB
First downs	19	28
Total yards	339	553
Rushing yards	114	330
Passing yards	225	223
Passing: Comp–Att–Int	19–39–2	18–24–0
Turnovers	2	1

Team	Category	Player	Statistics
New Mexico State	Passing	Chase Holbrook	15/30, 142 yards, 2 INT
New Mexico State	Rushing	Marquell Colston	8 rushes, 45 yards, TD
New Mexico State	Receiving	Julius Fleming	2 receptions, 60 yards
Nebraska	Passing	Joe Ganz	13/17, 158 yards, TD
Nebraska	Rushing	Marlon Lucky	15 rushes, 103 yards, 2 TD
Nebraska	Receiving	Mike McNeill	2 receptions, 57 yards, TD

=== At UTEP ===
	1	2	3	4	Total
Aggies	0	21	7	6	34
Miners	10	10	7	6	33

Statistics	NMSU	UTEP
First downs	22	21
Total yards	366	372
Rushing yards	37	277
Passing yards	329	95
Passing: Comp–Att–Int	29–39–2	11–26–0
Turnovers	4	3

Team	Category	Player	Statistics
New Mexico State	Passing	Chase Holbrook	29/39, 329 yards, 5 TD, 2 INT
New Mexico State	Rushing	Marquell Colston	8 rushes, 21 yards
New Mexico State	Receiving	Chris Williams	7 receptions, 119 yards
UTEP	Passing	James Thomas II	8/15, 60 yards
UTEP	Rushing	James Thomas II	19 rushes, 142 yards, 2 TD
UTEP	Receiving	Kris Adams	2 receptions, 47 yards

=== New Mexico ===
	1	2	3	4	Total
Lobos	0	10	6	19	35
Aggies	14	3	0	7	24

Statistics	UNM	NMSU
First downs	23	15
Total yards	352	430
Rushing yards	297	48
Passing yards	55	382
Passing: Comp–Att–Int	7–16–1	24–38–1
Turnovers	1	1

Team	Category	Player	Statistics
New Mexico	Passing	Brad Gruner	7/16, 55 yards, TD, INT
New Mexico	Rushing	Paul Baker	37 rushes, 147 yards, TD
New Mexico	Receiving	Bryant Williams	2 receptions, 22 yards
New Mexico State	Passing	Chase Holbrook	24/38, 382 yards, 3 TD, INT
New Mexico State	Rushing	Brandon Perez	4 rushes, 25 yards
New Mexico State	Receiving	Marcus Anderson	4 receptions, 121 yards, 2 TD

=== Alcorn State ===
	1	2	3	4	Total
Braves	0	3	0	7	10
Aggies	7	31	7	0	45

Statistics	ALCN	NMSU
First downs	14	24
Total yards	195	571
Rushing yards	-13	220
Passing yards	161	360
Passing: Comp–Att–Int	20–39–1	26–34–1
Turnovers	2	4

Team	Category	Player	Statistics
Alcorn State	Passing	Tim Buckley	11/21, 141 yards
Alcorn State	Rushing	Antoine Young	2 rushes, 15 yards
Alcorn State	Receiving	Elliott Moore	5 receptions, 52 yards
New Mexico State	Passing	Chase Holbrook	20/25, 270 yards, 2 TD
New Mexico State	Rushing	Marquell Colston	17 rushes, 127 yards, 2 TD
New Mexico State	Receiving	Chris Williams	6 receptions, 128 yards, TD

=== At Nevada ===
	1	2	3	4	Total
Aggies	7	14	17	10	48
Wolf Pack	10	14	14	7	45

Statistics	NMSU	NEV
First downs	28	28
Total yards	513	507
Rushing yards	104	313
Passing yards	409	194
Passing: Comp–Att–Int	28–47–1	15–26–1
Turnovers	1	3

Team	Category	Player	Statistics
New Mexico State	Passing	Chase Holbrook	28/47, 409 yards, 3 TD, INT
New Mexico State	Rushing	Marquell Colston	24 rushes, 118 yards, TD
New Mexico State	Receiving	Chris Williams	6 receptions, 128 yards
Nevada	Passing	Colin Kaepernick	15/26, 194 yards, 3 TD, INT
Nevada	Rushing	Vai Taua	20 rushes, 188 yards, 2 TD
Nevada	Receiving	Marko Mitchell	5 receptions, 97 yards

=== San Jose State ===
	1	2	3	4	Total
Spartans	14	7	0	10	31
Aggies	0	7	0	7	14

Statistics	SJSU	NMSU
First downs	11	17
Total yards	201	284
Rushing yards	151	35
Passing yards	50	249
Passing: Comp–Att–Int	8–18–3	28–45–3
Turnovers	3	4

Team	Category	Player	Statistics
San Jose State	Passing	Kyle Reed	8/18, 50 yards, 3 INT
San Jose State	Rushing	Yonus Davis	21 rushes, 107 yards, TD
San Jose State	Receiving	Josh Harrison	3 receptions, 29 yards
New Mexico State	Passing	Chase Holbrook	23/38, 206 yards, TD, 2 INT
New Mexico State	Rushing	Kyle Hughes	1 rush, 33 yards
New Mexico State	Receiving	Chris Williams	12 rushes, 146 yards, TD

=== At Idaho ===
	1	2	3	4	Total
Aggies	0	14	0	0	14
Vandals	7	7	3	3	20

Statistics	NMSU	IDHO
First downs	19	16
Total yards	359	330
Rushing yards	35	271
Passing yards	324	59
Passing: Comp–Att–Int	37–47–2	7–18–2
Turnovers	4	3

Team	Category	Player	Statistics
New Mexico State	Passing	Chase Holbrook	37/47, 324 yards, 2 TD, 2 INT
New Mexico State	Rushing	Tonny Glynn	10 rushes, 37 yards
New Mexico State	Receiving	Chris Williams	13 receptions, 112 yards, 2 TD
Idaho	Passing	Nathan Enderle	7/18, 59 yards, TD, 2 INT
Idaho	Rushing	Princeton McCarty	15 rushes, 160 yards, TD
Idaho	Receiving	Eddie Williams	2 receptions, 32 yards

=== No. 11 Boise State ===
	1	2	3	4	Total
No. 11 Broncos	7	21	14	7	49
Aggies	0	0	0	0	0

Statistics	BSU	NMSU
First downs	26	11
Total yards	495	150
Rushing yards	216	38
Passing yards	279	112
Passing: Comp–Att–Int	19–29–1	18–31–1
Turnovers	3	2

Team	Category	Player	Statistics
Boise State	Passing	Kellen Moore	14/22, 230 yards, 3 TD, INT
Boise State	Rushing	Ian Johnson	10 rushes, 61 yards, TD
Boise State	Receiving	Jeremy Childs	5 receptions, 84 yards, 2 TD
New Mexico State	Passing	Chase Holbrook	12/20, 64 yards, INT
New Mexico State	Rushing	Tonny Glynn	11 rushes, 37 yards
New Mexico State	Receiving	Julius Fleming	3 receptions, 41 yards

=== Hawaii ===
	1	2	3	4	Total
Warriors	14	21	7	0	42
Aggies	14	3	7	6	30

Statistics	HAW	NMSU
First downs	24	15
Total yards	447	394
Rushing yards	144	6
Passing yards	303	394
Passing: Comp–Att–Int	27–35–0	24–38–2
Turnovers	3	3

Team	Category	Player	Statistics
Hawaii	Passing	Greg Alexander	26/32, 288 yards, 2 TD
Hawaii	Rushing	Daniel Libre	13 rushes, 88 yards, 2 TD
Hawaii	Receiving	Greg Salas	7 receptions, 91 yards
New Mexico State	Passing	Chase Holbrook	24/38, 394 yards, 4 TD, 2 INT
New Mexico State	Rushing	Marquell Colston	5 rushes, 11 yards
New Mexico State	Receiving	Chris Williams	7 receptions, 221 yards, 3 TD

=== At Fresno State ===
	1	2	3	4	Total
Aggies	10	7	0	0	17
Bulldogs	3	14	0	7	24

Statistics	NMSU	FRES
First downs	11	20
Total yards	183	335
Rushing yards	-9	189
Passing yards	192	146
Passing: Comp–Att–Int	27–38–0	14–20–0
Turnovers	1	1

Team	Category	Player	Statistics
New Mexico State	Passing	Chase Holbrook	27/38, 192 yards, TD
New Mexico State	Rushing	Marquell Colston	4 rushes, 20 yards
New Mexico State	Receiving	A. J. Harris	9 receptions, 97 yards, TD
Fresno State	Passing	Tom Brandstater	14/20, 146 yards
Fresno State	Rushing	Anthony Harding	23 rushes, 101 yards
Fresno State	Receiving	Bear Pascoe	3 receptions, 56 yards

=== Louisiana Tech ===
	1	2	3	4	Total
Bulldogs	7	21	0	7	35
Aggies	0	17	7	7	31

Statistics	LT	NMSU
First downs	15	27
Total yards	358	516
Rushing yards	226	30
Passing yards	132	486
Passing: Comp–Att–Int	12–20–0	45–59–0
Turnovers	0	1

Team	Category	Player	Statistics
Louisiana Tech	Passing	Ross Jenkins	12/20, 132 yards, TD
Louisiana Tech	Rushing	Daniel Porter	17 rushes, 130 yards, TD
Louisiana Tech	Receiving	Phillip Livas	4 receptions, 88 yards, TD
New Mexico State	Passing	Chase Holbrook	45/59, 486 yards, 4 TD
New Mexico State	Rushing	Tonny Glynn	10 rushes, 19 yards
New Mexico State	Receiving	Chris Williams	10 receptions, 189 yards, 2 TD

=== At Utah State ===
	1	2	3	4	Total
NMSU Aggies	0	0	0	2	2
USU Aggies	21	7	10	9	47

Statistics	NMSU	USU
First downs	12	22
Total yards	156	410
Rushing yards	-7	241
Passing yards	163	169
Passing: Comp–Att–Int	25–37–1	18–29–0
Turnovers	2	0

Team	Category	Player	Statistics
New Mexico State	Passing	Chase Holbrook	25/37, 163 yards, INT
New Mexico State	Rushing	Tonny Glynn	6 rushes, 21 yards
New Mexico State	Receiving	A. J. Harris	6 receptions, 53 yards
Utah State	Passing	Diondre Borel	14/24, 118 yards
Utah State	Rushing	Diondre Borel	16 rushes, 53 yards, TD
Utah State	Receiving	Otis Nelson	3 receptions, 53 yards
