= 2008 Hawaii Warriors football team =

American college football season

2008 Hawaii Warriors football

Hawaii Bowl, L 21–49 vs. Notre Dame
- Conference: Western Athletic Conference
- Record: 7–7 (5–3 WAC)
- Head coach: Greg McMackin (1st season)
- Offensive coordinator: Ron Lee (1st season)
- Offensive scheme: Run and shoot
- Defensive coordinator: Cal Lee (1st season)
- Base defense: 4–3
- Home stadium: Aloha Stadium

2008 Western Athletic Conference football standings
	Conf.			Overall
Team	W		L	W		L
No. 11 Boise State $	8	–	0	12	–	1
Louisiana Tech	5	–	3	8	–	5
Nevada	5	–	3	7	–	6
Hawaii	5	–	3	7	–	7
Fresno State	4	–	4	7	–	6
San Jose State	4	–	4	6	–	6
Utah State	3	–	5	3	–	9
New Mexico State	1	–	7	3	–	9
Idaho	1	–	7	2	–	10
$ – Conference champion; Rankings from AP Poll

The 2008 Hawaii Warriors football team represented the University of Hawaii at Manoa in the 2008 NCAA Division I FBS football season. The Warriors started the season with a new coaching staff headed by Greg McMackin, who had previously been the team's defensive coordinator.

== Schedule ==
Date	Time	Opponent	Site	TV	Result	Attendance	Source
August 30	7:30 am	at No. 5 Florida*	Ben Hill Griffin Stadium; Gainesville, FL	Raycom Sports, Oceanic PPV, KFVE (delayed)	L 10–56	90,575	
September 6	6:05 pm	Weber State*	Aloha Stadium; Halawa, HI	KJZZ, Oceanic PPV, KFVE (delayed)	W 36–17	39,446	
September 13	1:00 pm	at Oregon State*	Reser Stadium; Corvallis, OR	FSN NW, Oceanic PPV	L 7–45	45,059	
September 27	6:05 pm	San José State	Aloha Stadium; Halawa, HI (rivalry)	Oceanic PPV, KFVE (delayed)	L 17–20	40,571	
October 4	4:00 pm	at No. 22 Fresno State	Bulldog Stadium; Fresno, CA (rivalry)	ESPN Gameplan, BSN, Oceanic PPV, KFVE (delayed)	W 32–29 ^{OT}	40,572	
October 11	6:05 pm	Louisiana Tech^{†}	Aloha Stadium; Halawa, HI	Oceanic PPV, KFVE (delayed)	W 24–14	40,246	
October 18	2:00 pm	at No. 15 Boise State	Bronco Stadium; Boise, ID	ESPN	L 7–27	32,342	
October 25	6:05 pm	Nevada	Aloha Stadium; Halawa, HI	Oceanic PPV, KFVE (delayed)	W 38–31	40,225	
November 1	9:00 am	at Utah State	Romney Stadium; Logan, UT	ESPN Gameplan, Oceanic PPV, KFVE (delayed)	L 14–30	12,112	
November 8	2:00 pm	at New Mexico State	Aggie Memorial Stadium; Las Cruces, NM	ESPN Gameplan, AggieVision, Oceanic PPV, KFVE (delayed)	W 42–30	10,861	
November 22	5:05 pm	Idaho	Aloha Stadium; Halawa, HI	Oceanic PPV, KFVE (delayed)	W 49–17	39,014	
November 29	6:05pm	Washington State*	Aloha Stadium; Halawa, HI	Oceanic PPV, KFVE (delayed)	W 24–10	42,312	
December 6	6:30pm	No. 13 Cincinnati*	Aloha Stadium; Halawa, HI	ESPN2	L 24–29	40,549	
December 24	3:00pm	Notre Dame*	Aloha Stadium; Halawa, HI (Hawaii Bowl)	ESPN	L 21–49	45,718	
*Non-conference game; ^{†}Homecoming; Rankings from AP Poll released prior to the game; All times are in Hawaii–Aleutian time

== Game summaries ==
=== At No. 5 Florida ===
	1	2	3	4	Total
Warriors	0	0	0	10	10
No. 5 Gators	0	28	28	0	56

=== Weber State ===
	1	2	3	4	Total
Wildcats	3	14	0	0	17
Warriors	7	0	22	7	36

=== At Oregon State ===
	1	2	3	4	Total
Warriors	7	0	0	0	7
Beavers	7	14	17	7	45

=== San Jose State ===
	1	2	3	4	Total
Spartans	7	0	7	6	20
Warriors	7	10	0	0	17

=== At No. 22 Fresno State ===
	1	2	3	4	OT	Total
Warriors	9	10	10	0	3	32
No. 22 Bulldogs	3	6	13	7	0	29

=== Louisiana Tech ===
	1	2	3	4	Total
Bulldogs	0	7	0	7	14
Warriors	7	14	3	0	24

=== At No. 16 Boise State ===
	1	2	3	4	Total
Warriors	0	7	0	0	7
No. 16 Broncos	3	7	14	3	27

=== Nevada ===
	1	2	3	4	Total
Wolf Pack	7	3	7	14	31
Warriors	7	7	10	14	38

=== At Utah State ===
	1	2	3	4	Total
Warriors	0	7	0	7	14
Aggies	3	10	7	10	30

=== At New Mexico State ===
	1	2	3	4	Total
Warriors	14	21	7	0	42
Aggies	14	3	7	6	30

=== Idaho ===
	1	2	3	4	Total
Vandals	7	3	0	7	17
Warriors	14	14	14	7	49

=== Washington State ===
	1	2	3	4	Total
Cougars	0	3	7	0	10
Warriors	14	3	7	0	24

=== No. 13 Cincinnati ===
	1	2	3	4	Total
No. 13 Bearcats	3	7	0	19	29
Warriors	0	3	14	7	24

=== Vs. Notre Dame (Hawaii Bowl) ===
	1	2	3	4	Total
Warriors	0	7	7	7	21
Fighting Irish	7	21	21	0	49
