= 2008 Boise State Broncos football team =

American college football season

2008 Boise State Broncos football

WAC champion

Poinsettia Bowl, L 16–17 vs. TCU
- Conference: Western Athletic Conference

Ranking
- Coaches: No. 13
- AP: No. 11
- Record: 12–1 (8–0 WAC)
- Head coach: Chris Petersen (3rd season)
- Offensive coordinator: Bryan Harsin (3rd season)
- Offensive scheme: Multiple
- Defensive coordinator: Justin Wilcox (3rd season)
- Base defense: 4–3
- Home stadium: Bronco Stadium

2008 Western Athletic Conference football standings
	Conf.			Overall
Team	W		L	W		L
No. 11 Boise State $	8	–	0	12	–	1
Louisiana Tech	5	–	3	8	–	5
Nevada	5	–	3	7	–	6
Hawaii	5	–	3	7	–	7
Fresno State	4	–	4	7	–	6
San Jose State	4	–	4	6	–	6
Utah State	3	–	5	3	–	9
New Mexico State	1	–	7	3	–	9
Idaho	1	–	7	2	–	10
$ – Conference champion; Rankings from AP Poll

The 2008 Boise State Broncos football team represented Boise State University in the 2008 NCAA Division I FBS football season. The Broncos played their home games at Bronco Stadium, most famous for its blue artificial turf surface, often referred to as the "smurf-turf". The blue turf was new for the 2008 season, as the old Astroplay surface was replaced by Field Turf. The Broncos won the Western Athletic Conference championship and were one of only two teams (the other being the Utah Utes) to finish the 2008 regular season with an undefeated record. However, the Broncos were unable to finish the season undefeated after losing 17–16 to #11 TCU in the Poinsettia Bowl.

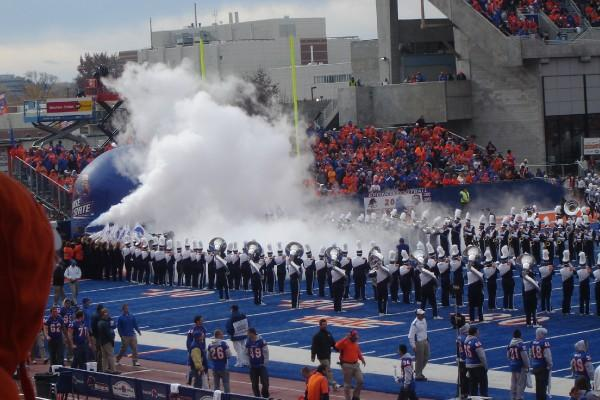
The Broncos take the field through the fog during the 2008 season.

== Schedule ==
Date	Time	Opponent	Rank	Site	TV	Result	Attendance	Source
August 30	6:00 pm	Idaho State*		Bronco Stadium; Boise, ID (Battle for the Liberty Bell)	KTVB	W 49–7	32,318	
September 13	6:00 pm	Bowling Green*		Bronco Stadium; Boise, ID	KTVB	W 20–7	32,335	
September 20	1:30 pm	at No. 17 Oregon*		Autzen Stadium; Eugene, OR	KTVB	W 37–32	58,713	
October 1	6:00 pm	Louisiana Tech	No. 17	Bronco Stadium; Boise, ID	ESPN	W 38–3	32,071	
October 11	6:00 pm	at Southern Miss*	No. 15	M. M. Roberts Stadium; Hattiesburg, MS	CBSCS	W 24–7	30,912	
October 17	6:00 pm	Hawaii	No. 15	Bronco Stadium; Boise, ID	ESPN	W 27–7	32,342	
October 24	7:00 pm	at San Jose State	No. 13	Spartan Stadium; San Jose, CA	ESPN2	W 33–16	26,258	
November 1	5:00 pm	at New Mexico State	No. 11	Aggie Memorial Stadium; Las Cruces, NM	KTVB	W 49–0	15,922	
November 8	12:00 pm	Utah State	No. 9	Bronco Stadium; Boise, ID	KTVB	W 49–14	32,171	
November 15	3:00 pm	at Idaho	No. 9	Kibbie Dome; Moscow, ID (rivalry)	KTVB	W 45–10	17,000	
November 22	2:00 pm	at Nevada	No. 9	Mackay Stadium; Reno, NV (rivalry)	KTVB/ESPN2	W 41–34	27,057	
November 28	4:00 pm	Fresno State	No. 9	Bronco Stadium; Boise, ID (rivalry)	ESPN2	W 61–10	32,412	
December 23	6:00 pm	vs. No. 11 TCU*	No. 9	Qualcomm Stadium; San Diego, CA (SDCCU Poinsettia Bowl)	ESPN	L 16–17	34,628	
*Non-conference game; Rankings from AP Poll released prior to the game; All times are in Mountain time

== Rankings ==
Ranking movements Legend: ██ Increase in ranking ██ Decrease in ranking
	Week																
Poll	Pre	1	2	3	4	5	6	7	8	9	10	11	12	13	14	15	Final
AP	36	32	29	29	19	17	15	15	13	11	9	9	9	9	9	9	11
Coaches	34	33	30	29	20	18	16	16	13	11	10	9	9	9	9	9	13
Harris	Not released					18	15	15	13	11	10	9	9	9	9	9	Not released
BCS	Not released								12	11	10	9	9	9	9	9	Not released

== Preseason ==
On July 25, the Broncos were selected as the favorite to win the WAC by the media by a total of 383 points to 379 for Fresno State and first place votes of 25 to 20. The WAC coaches (not allowed to vote for their own team) voted Fresno #1 with a total of 63 to 57 points. Fresno had a total of 7 first place votes among WAC coaches to Boise States 2.

The USA Today Coaches preseason top 25 poll was released on August 1, with Boise State receiving 25 votes to rank 34th. The Associated Press preseason top 25 poll was released on August 16, with Boise State receiving 17 votes to rank 36th.

== Game summaries ==
=== Idaho State ===
	1	2	3	4	Total
Bengals	0	7	0	0	7
Broncos	7	21	14	7	49

The Broncos opened the 2008 season with a 49–7 win over their former in-state rival Idaho State in front of a new Bronco Stadium record crowd of 32,318. Freshman quarterback Kellen Moore completed 14 of 19 passes for 274 and 2 Touchdowns (80, 56) in his first collegiate start. Ian Johnson rushed 14 times for 87 yards and one score while Titus Young made 7 receptions for 142 yards and one touchdown and also one rushing touchdown. Richie Brockel rushed for two touchdowns and Tyler Shoemaker caught two TD passes. The two touchdowns by Young, Brockel and Shoemaker marks the first time three Bronco's had each scored two touchdowns in one game. The Broncos out gained the Bengals 582 to 207 in total yards. The Broncos also blocked a Bengal punt in the 2nd quarter. With the win the Broncos moved their regular season home winning streak to 44. At one point in the fourth quarter, all 11 players on Defense for the Bronco's were freshman.

=== Bowling Green ===
	1	2	3	4	Total
Falcons	0	0	0	7	7
Broncos	6	14	0	0	20

Another Bronco Stadium record crowd of 32,335 watched as Boise State raised their regular season home winning streak to 45 games by beating Bowling Green 20–7. The Broncos came out fast scoring 3 touchdowns in the first half. A much improved second half Bowling Green defense mixed with various mental mistakes by the Bronco offense left the Broncos scoreless in the second half. Ian Johnson rushed 13 times for 97 yards and two touchdowns while quarterback Kellen Moore went 18 of 23 for 180, started the game 11 of 11, and rushed for his first career touchdown. Kyle Brotzman set a Boise State record by making his 75th straight extra point, breaking the record held by Tyler Jones of 74 made in 2003 and 2004. Safety Jeron Johnson had 13 tackles (8 solo), 1.5 tackles for loss, one pass break up and two second half fumble recoveries to win WAC defensive player of the week.

=== Oregon ===
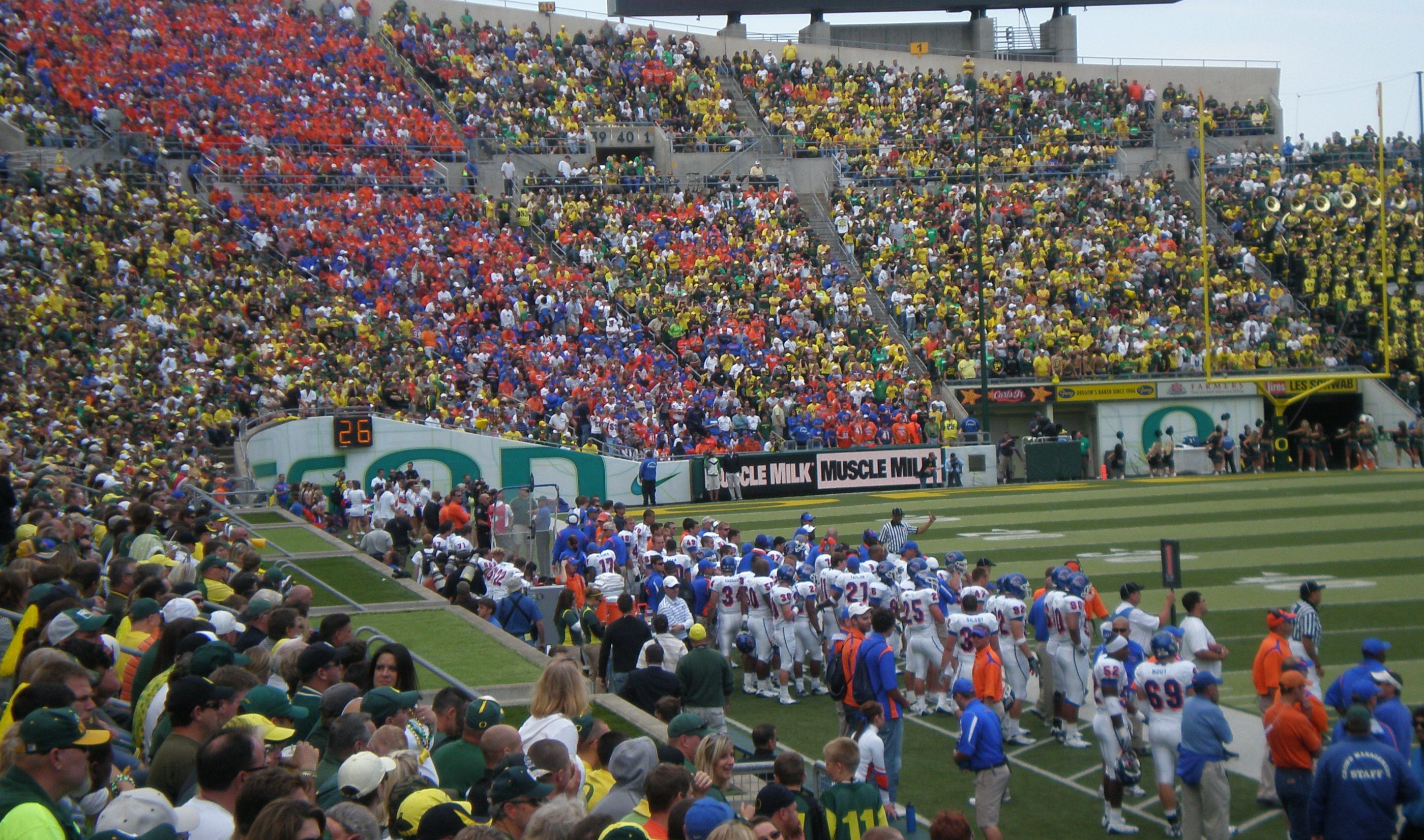
Boise State sideline and fans in Autzen Stadium.

	1	2	3	4	Total
Broncos	0	24	13	0	37
#12 Ducks	6	0	7	19	32

Since joining D1A (now FBS) in 1996, Boise State had lost all 13 of their road games against teams from BCS conferences. That streak ended with a 37–32 win over Oregon of the Pac-10 in front of 58,713 hostile fans in Autzen Stadium. The Broncos held leads of 24–6 at halftime and 37–13 in the 4th before Oregon closed out the game with 19 unanswered points. The Broncos were held to only 38 yards rushing, but were helped by the arm of Freshman quarterback Kellen Moore. Moore went 25-37 for 386 yards, 3 touchdowns and 1 interception. One touchdown pass went for 73 yards to Senior Vinny Perretta, his first TD of the season, before he left the game with a concussion. Junior Jeremy Childs added 4 receptions for 100 yards with a long of 41. Junior Kyle Wilson made 2 interceptions (totaling 3 on the season) while Sophomore Brandyn Thompson made his first career interception. Sophomore kicker Kyle Brotzman went 3–4 on field goals from 24, 36, and a career long 51 yards. Sophomore safety Jeron Johnson was ejected late in the 4th. The win propelled the Broncos into the top 25 in both major polls for the first time this season, being ranked 19th by the AP and 20th by the coaches in the USA Today poll. For his efforts, Kellen Moore was named the Walter Camp Football Foundation Bowl Subdivision National Offensive Player of the Week and the WAC Offensive Player of the Week. The Broncos were also named the Tostitos Fiesta Bowl National Team of the Week.

=== Louisiana Tech ===
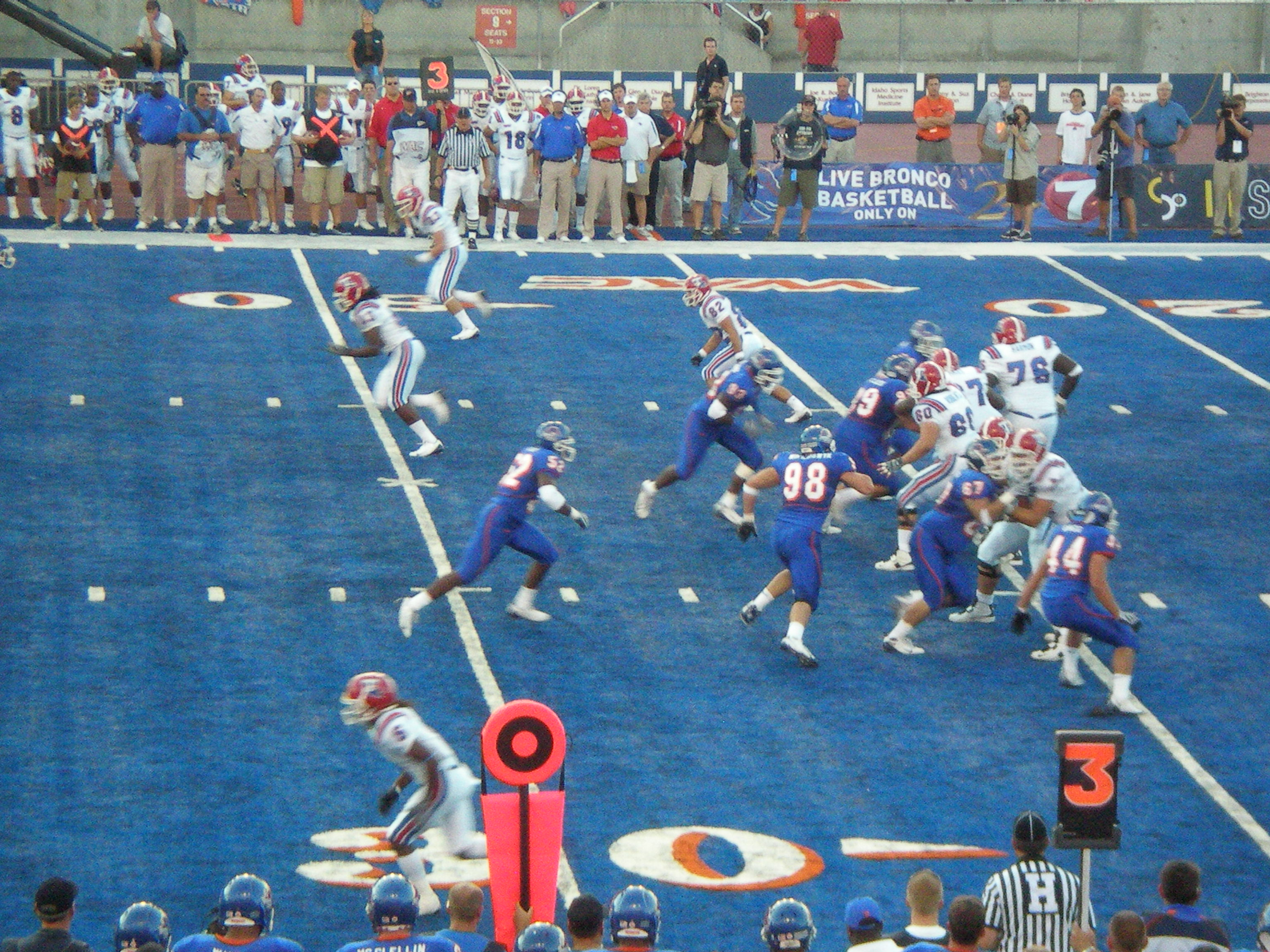
Boise State on defense in the first half.

	1	2	3	4	Total
Bulldogs	0	3	0	0	3
#18 Broncos	7	14	10	7	38

Boise State won their WAC opener for the 8th straight year and extended their regular season home winning streak to 46 by defeating the Bulldogs of Louisiana Tech 38–3. Kellen Moore threw an interception on the opening drive, then was almost perfect finishing the game 20-28 for 325 and 2 TD's (13, 44) to Julian Hawkins and Chris O'niel, the latter on a reverse throw back to Moore from Vinny Perretta. Moore's numbers were good enough to earn the WAC Offensive Player of the Week award for the second time this season. D.J. Harper added 2 TD's on 9 carries for 35 yards. Ian Johnson again had a subpar rushing game, 9 for 42, but had his first career 100 yard receiving game with 106 on 3 catches. The Bronco defense has now given up 7 points or less in 3 of the 4 games this season. Kyle Brotzman hit a 49-yard field goal and averaged 57.7 yards on 3 punts including one downed at the 1-yard line and another of 72 yards. The Broncos moved up in the top 25 polls to #15 in the AP and #16 in the USA Today Coaches poll.

=== Southern Miss ===
	1	2	3	4	Total
#16 Broncos	0	24	0	0	24
Golden Eagles	0	7	0	0	7

The Bronco defense shined in holding the strong Southern Mississippi offense to just 278 yards, stops on 4 fourth down tries and forced 2 turnovers to help the Bronco offense that continues to struggle. The Bronco offense was great in the second quarter, scoring all of their 24 points, but a series of three and outs, penalties and other bad decisions led to just 113 yards and 6 first downs in the second half. The Broncos were held scoreless in the second half for the second time this season, but also held their opponent to 7 points or less for the fourth time in five games this season. Kellen Moore went 21 of 30 for 170, 3 TD's and 1 pick. 10 of his completions went to Jeremy Childs for 92 yards. Austin Pettis added 2 TD's on 4 catches for 30 yards. Jeron Johnson recorded his first interception of the season. Kyle Brotzman went 3 for 3 on PAT's, made a 32-yard field goal and averaged 39.7 yards on 6 punts that included 2 down inside the 20-yard line and a long of 63 in rout to being awarded the WAC Special Teams Player of the Week for the third time in his two-year career. Boise State remained the same in every major poll following the win. Prior to the game wide receiver Titus Young, who had previously been suspended for the Oregon game, was suspended indefinitely.

=== Hawaii ===
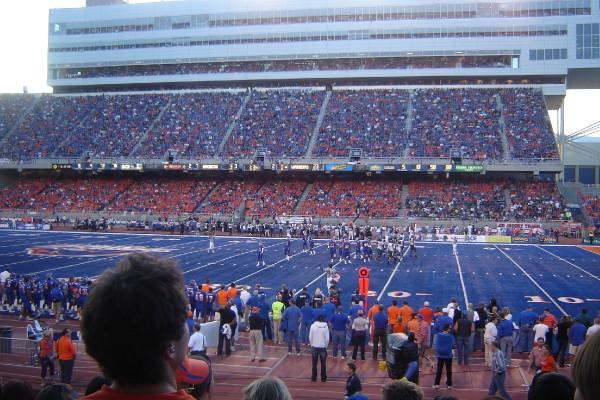
A then record crowd of 32,342 watches Boise State vs Hawaii.

	1	2	3	4	Total
Warriors	0	7	0	0	7
#16 Broncos	3	7	14	3	27

The Broncos defense came up with 5 interceptions and 7 sacks in taking down the defending WAC champion Hawaii Warriors 27–7 in front of another record crowd of 32,342 in Bronco Stadium. Brandyn Thompson had 3 interceptions and 5 solo tackles (one for a loss) to be awarded the WAC Defensive Player of the Week. George Iloka and Jeron Johnson also made interceptions. This marked the 5th time this season the Bronco Defense held their opponent to 7 points or less and moved to 2nd in the nation in scoring defense giving up only 10.5 PPG. On offense, Kellen Moore went 25 of 33 for 256 and 3 TD's, 6 of his passes going to Vinny Perretta for 82 yards. Kyle Brotzman won the WAC Special Teams Player of the Week for the second straight week going 2 for 4 on field goals (31, 43), brought his school record for consecutive extra points to 90, and averaged 60 yards on 3 punts with a career long of 75 and 2 downed inside the 20. The Broncos have still never lost a home WAC game (26 straight) and have now won 47 straight regular season home games. The Broncos moved to #13 in all of the major polls and debuted at #12 in the first BCS rankings.

=== San Jose State ===
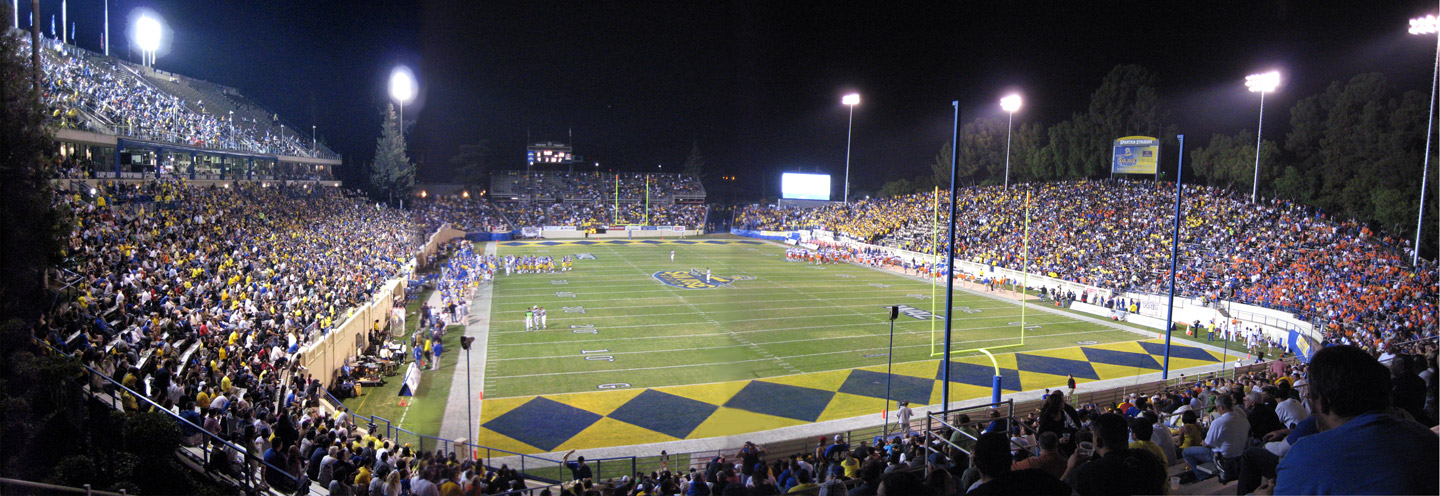
Spartan Stadium SJSU vs BSU

	1	2	3	4	Total
#13 Broncos	6	14	3	10	33
Spartans	6	3	7	0	16

The last two trips to San Jose for Boise State resulted in unsuccessful but scary close upset bids by the Spartans, both times the Broncos were undefeated. This game had the same ingredients and looked to be heading for a close finish being 20–16 in the third quarter, but the Broncos scored the game's final 13 points to stay undefeated and stop the Spartans chances of playing spoiler to the Broncos undefeated chances. Kellen Moore went 26 of 40 for 244 1 INT and 2 TD's to Jeremy Childs and Austin Pettis. Jeremy Avery rushed 21 times for 96 yards and Ian Johnson added 66 on 16 carries and 2 TD's to set a new career touchdown mark in Boise State history, now with 51. Along with his 5 receptions Jeremy Childs had a first quarter punt block that led to a Bronco Touchdown. Kyle Brotzman hit 2 field goals from 31 and 39. The win gives the Broncos sole possession of first place in the WAC and moved them to #11 in every major poll, including the BCS.

=== New Mexico State ===
	1	2	3	4	Total
#11 Broncos	7	21	14	7	49
Aggies	0	0	0	0	0

New Mexico State quarterback Chase Holbrook, who entered the game averaging 295 yards a game, only managed 64 yards passing and his Aggies were shut out by Boise State for the second straight year. The Bronco defense held the Aggies to only 150 total yards, made 7 sacks, 1 INT by Kyle Wilson, forced one fumble and now have given up 7 points or less in 6 of 8 games this season and are now giving up just 9.88 points per game. Kyle Wilson also scored the Broncos first non offensive touchdown of the season by returning a fourth quarter punt 71 yards. On offense, Kellen Moore went 15 of 23 for 246, 1 INT and 3 TD's, 1 to Austin Pettis and 2 to Jeremy Childs. Ian Johnson had 10 carries for 61 yards and 1 TD to increase his school record to 52 TD's in his career. The Broncos moved to #9 in the AP Poll, their highest regular season ranking in school history, and moved to #10 in every other poll.

=== Utah State ===
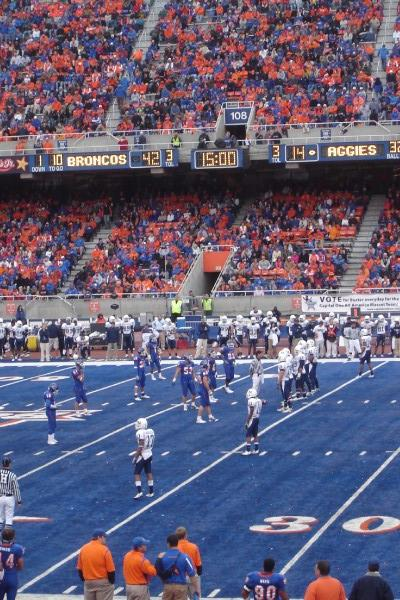
Beginning of the 4th quarter.

	1	2	3	4	Total
Aggies	0	7	7	0	14
#10 Broncos	7	21	14	7	49

Four different Bronco players threw for a combined 5 TD's and 458 yards passing to collect their 37th straight conference home win and remain undefeated on the season. Kellen Moore went 27 of 36 for 362, 2 TD's and 1 INT. Backup quarterback Mike Coughlin and wide receivers Tanyon Bissell and Vinny Perretta also added TD passes. Perretta added a 38-yard touchdown reception of his own to go along with 2 each by Jeremy Childs (57, 17) and Austin Pettis (7, 5). Ian Johnson's 1-yard TD run moved his school record for career rushing TD's to 53. The Bronco defense held the Aggie rushing attack to just 44 yards, forced 6 turnovers and scored their first TD of the season when Ellis Powers picked up a Ryan Winterswyk forced fumble and returned it 4 yards. George Iloka had 2 interceptions. The Bronocs are now ranked #9 in every major poll.

=== Idaho ===
	1	2	3	4	Total
#9 Broncos	14	3	21	7	45
Vandals	7	3	0	0	10

The Broncos knocked off their in-state rivals for the 10th straight year to retain the Governor's Trophy and secure their 6th WAC Championship in 7 years. The Vandals opened the game with an 81-yard TD on the first play of the game and it was all down hill from there. The Broncos ran over the Vandals to the tune of 525 yards, 315 of those on the ground. Jeremy Avery became the first Bronco back to go over 100 yards this season by gaining 156 yards on 11 carries, had a long of 57 for one of his two touchdowns and set a school record with 14.2 YPC. Ian Johnson added to his school record for rushing TD's which now stands at 54. Kellen Moore went 23 for 31 for 210 yards, 11 of those to Jeremy Childs for 99 yards and 6 to Austin Pettis for 71 yards. Kyle Wilson now leads the WAC with 5 interceptions and returned a punt 79 yards for his second return TD of the season. Ellis Powers return a fumble 45 yards for a TD, his second TD in as many weeks. True freshman defensive lineman Byron Hout, who made 5 solo tackles, 2 sacks and forced the fumble that led to the Powers TD, was named the WAC Defensive Player of the Week. The Broncos remained at #9 in every major poll.

=== Nevada ===
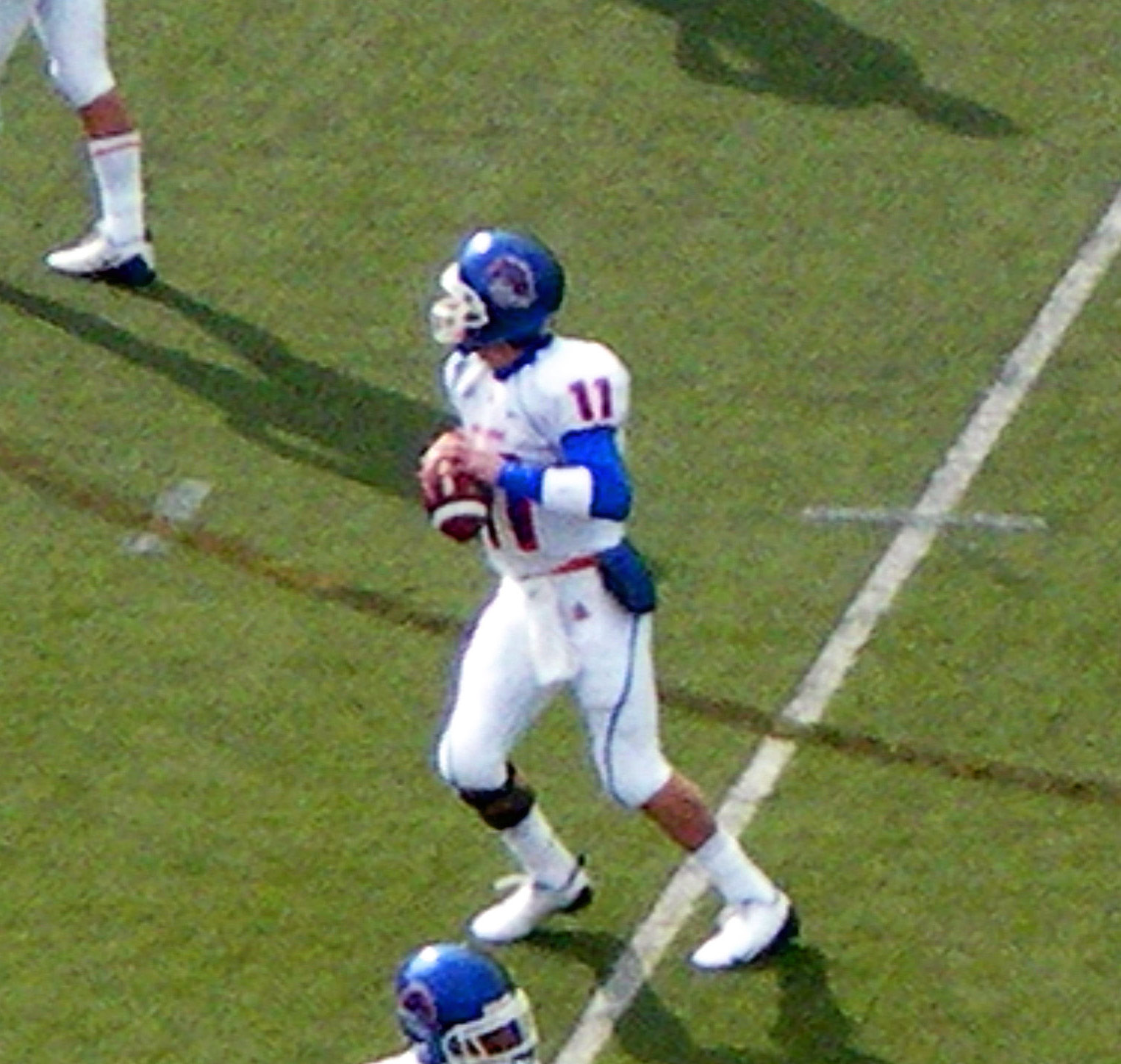
Freshman QB Kellen Moore threw for a then career high 414 yards

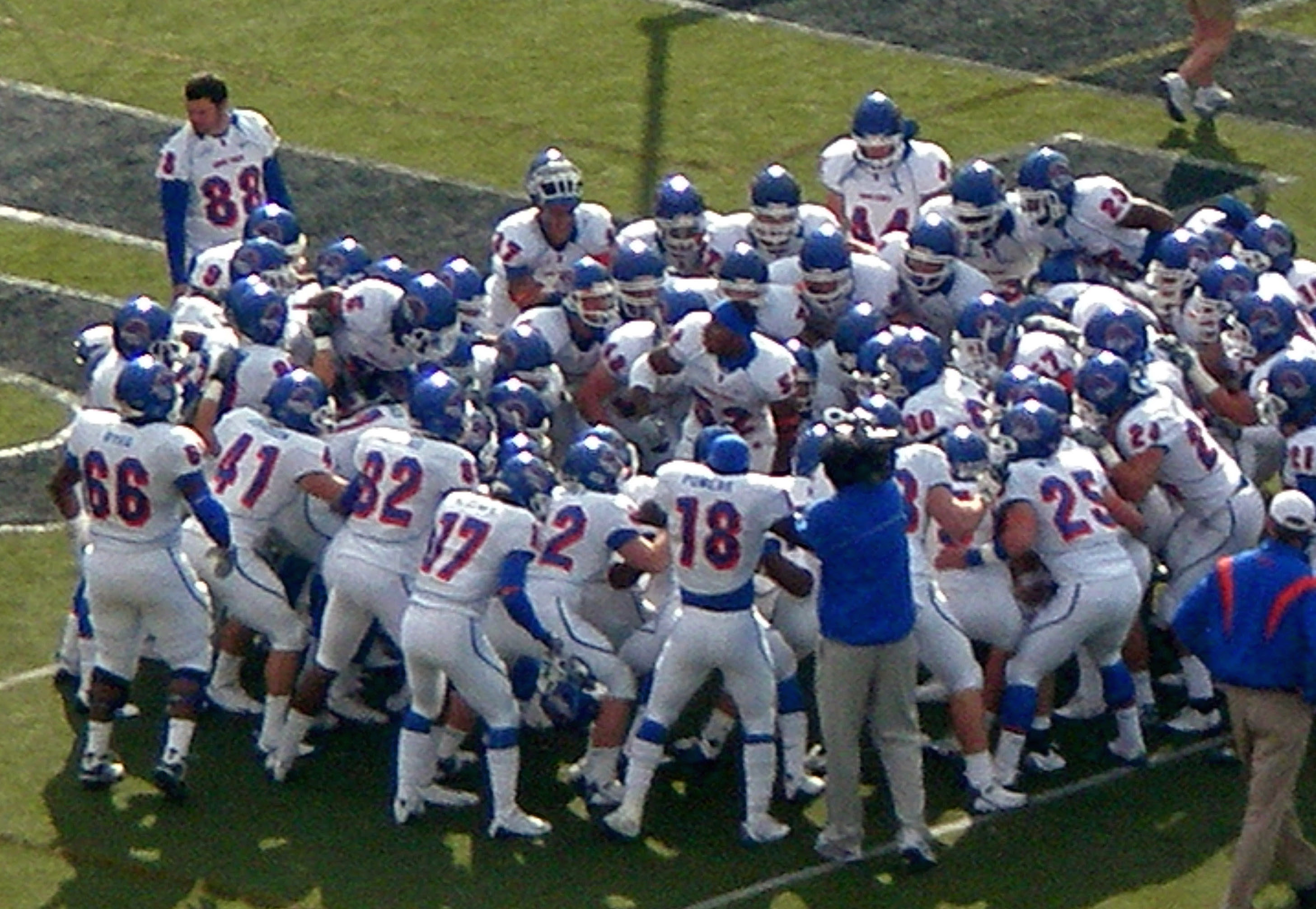
Bronco players during pregame

	1	2	3	4	Total
#9 Broncos	14	10	7	10	41
Wolf Pack	0	3	21	10	34

The Broncos held off a frenzy second half comeback by the Wolf Pack that ended when Colin Kaepernick's pass was batted down in the end zone on the last play of the game to secure the Broncos their 11th win of the season, their 5th season this decade with 11 wins or more, and the WAC championship for the 6th time in 7 years. The Broncos came out quick to lead Nevada 24–3 at halftime, but Kellen Moore threw 3 3rd quarter interceptions, 2 that were returned for touchdowns, and Nevada's offense scored on a 31-yard run to make it 31–24 at the end of 3. The Bronco's pushed their lead back to 17 on an Austin Pettis touchdown reception and a Kyle Brotzman 50-yard field goal. Nevada scored a TD with 4:36 left, recovered an on-side kick, kicked a FG with 2:36 left, and got the ball one last time with 1:37 left after a Brotzman missed 44-yard field goal but couldn't punch it in the end zone to force overtime. Kellen Moore went 29 of 48 for 414, a career-high, 3 TD's and the 3 costly INT's. Austin Pettis had 9 catches for 126 yards and 2 TD's (18, 10) to be named WAC Offensive Player of the Week while Vinny Perretta made 5 catches for 126 yards and a rushing TD. The Broncos only managed 70 yards rushing, 66 of those on an Ian Johnson TD run. The Broncos remained #9 in all major polls for the 3rd consecutive week.

=== Fresno State ===
	1	2	3	4	Total
Bulldogs	7	3	0	0	10
#9 Broncos	7	6	28	20	61

The new record crowd of 32,412 rushed the field and fireworks went off above Bronco Stadium to celebrate the Broncos 3rd undefeated season in 5 years, their 5th 8-0 WAC season in the last 7 years, and their 7th straight year of being undefeated at home all to keep their slim BCS chances alive. Senior QB Bush Hamdan started on Senior day and threw 1 pass that was intercepted and returned for a touchdown by Fresno State. The Bulldogs would only manage 3 points the rest of the game. The Broncos started slow in the first half leading only 13–10 at the half but broke the game wide open with 4 TD's in the third. Jeremy Avery scored on a 43-yard rush, Kyle Wilson returned a punt 90 yards for his 3rd return score of the year, Julian Hawkins caught a 35-yard TD pass from WR Tayon Bissel on a reverse pass, and Kellen Moore found TE Tommy Gallarda for a 16-yard touchdown reception. Ian Johnson had a 69-yard run on the last play of the 3rd quarter and scored a TD to open the 4th. Johnson added another TD later in the 4th to tie Marshall Faulk for the WAC record for TD rushes in a career with 57. In all Johnson carried the ball 14 times for 128 and the 2 scores. Kellen Moore went 17 for 23 for 213 and 2 TD's. Kyle Wilson was named the WAC Special Teams Player of the Week. On December 7, the Broncos were selected to play #11 Texas Christian (10–2) in the San Diego County Credit Union Poinsettia Bowl on December 23.

== Roster ==
(Updated 11/20/08)
Quarterbacks: 11 Kellen Moore - Freshman (S); 3 Bush Hamdan - Senior; 7 Michael Coughlin - Sophomore; 10 Drew Hawkins - (redshirt) Freshman; Running backs: 41 Ian Johnson^{†} - Senior (S); 27 Jeremy Avery* - Sophomore; 6 D.J. Harper* - Sophomore; 22 Doug Martin - Freshman; 28 Jarvis Hodge - Sophomore; 26 Matt Kaiserman - (redshirt) Freshman; Carlo Audagnotti - (redshirt) Freshman; Mana Purdy- (redshirt) Freshman; Fullbacks: 47 Dan Paul - Freshman (S); 32 Andy Silsby - Junior; 34 Stephen Gabbard - Freshman; Jake Hess- (redshirt) Freshman; Drew Wright- (redshirt) Freshman; Wide receivers: 9 Jeremy Childs^{†} - Junior (S); 19 Vinny Perretta - Senior (S); 82 Julian Hawkins* - Senior (S); 87 Austin Pettis^{†} - Sophomore; 2 Tanyon Bissell* - Senior; 21 Toshi Franklin* - Senior; 89 Tyler Shoemaker- Freshman; 46 Michael Choate - Junior; 4 Titus Young^{†} - Sophomore (suspended); 20 Mitch Burroughs - (redshirt) Freshman; 81 Chris Potter- (redshirt) Freshman; 84 Tim Ruben- (redshirt) Freshman	Offensive guards: 76 Jon Gott - Senior (S); 71 Cory Yriarte- Freshman (S); 62 Kevin Sapien - Sophomore; 77 Ben Iannacchione - Senior; 59 Will Lawrence - Sophomore; 75 Faraji Wright - (redshirt) Freshman; 79 Bronson Durrant - (redshirt) Freshman; 61 Joe Kellogg - (redshirt) Freshman; 64 Brenel Myers - (redshirt) Freshman; Offensive tackles: 60 Andrew Woodruff^{†} - Senior (S); 62 Kevin Sapien - Sophomore (S); 72 Matt Slater - Junior; 73 Nate Potter - Sophomore; 70 Zach Waller- Freshman; 74 Tom Swanson - (redshirt) Freshman; 54 Michael Ames - (redshirt) Freshman; Centers: 65 Thomas Byrd- Freshman (S); 57 Garret Pendergast- Freshman; Tight ends: 40 Richie Brockel^{†} - Junior (S); 85 Tommy Gallarda - Junior; 80 Kyle Efaw- Freshman; 83 Shaun King - Sophomore; 38 Josh Hill - Freshman; 86 Chandler Koch - (redshirt) Freshman; 88 Chris O'Neill* - Senior (I)	Defensive ends: 93 Mike T. Williams^{†} - Senior (S); 98 Ryan Winterswyk^{†} - Junior (S); 92 Shea McClellin - Freshman; 94 Byron Hout - Freshman; 91 Chuck Hayes - Freshman; 96 Jarrell Root - Freshman (I); Defensive tackles: 53 Sean Bingham^{†} - Senior (S); 90 Billy Winn- Freshman (S); 67 Joe Bozikovich^{†} - Senior; 50 J.P. Nisby - Freshman; 97 Chase Baker - Freshman; 95 Darren Koontz - (redshirt) Freshman; 68 Greg Grimes - (redshirt) Freshman; 65 Michael Atkinson - (redshirt) Freshman; 99 Steven Reveles - Senior (I); Linebackers: 24 Tim Brady^{†} - Senior (S); 44 Kyle Gingg^{†} - Senior (S); 52 Derrell Acrey* - Sophomore (S); 51 Dallas Dobbs^{†} - Senior; 36 Aaron Tevis- Freshman; 25 Hunter White- Freshman; 47 Dan Paul - Freshman; 28 Dave Wilson- Freshman; 42 Matt Wilson- Freshman; 45 Daron Mackey - (redshirt) Junior; 33 Tommy Smith - (redshirt) Freshman; 43 Alex Ruben - (redshirt) Freshman; 46 Hazen Moss - (redshirt) Freshman; 56 Alex Lavoy - (redshirt) Freshman; 48 JC Percy - (redshirt) Freshman	Cornerbacks: 1 Kyle Wilson^{†} - Junior (S); 13 Brandyn Thompson* - Sophomore (S); 21 Jamar Taylor - Freshman; 16 Cedric Febis - Freshman; 17 Keith McGowen - Sophomore; 14 Garcia Day - Senior; 31 Antwon Murray - Freshman; 38 Raphael Lambert - (redshirt) Freshman; 20 Josh Borgman - (redshirt) Freshman; Safeties: 23 Jeron Johnson^{†} - Sophomore (S); 18 Ellis Powers* - Senior (S); 8 George Iloka - Freshman; 5 Jason Robinson - Sophomore; 30 Travis Stanaway- Freshman; 29 Tyler Jackson - (redshirt) Freshman; Punters: 35 Kyle Brotzman^{†} - Sophomore (S); 49 Brad Elkin- Sophomore; Kickers: 35 Kyle Brotzman^{†} - Sophomore (S); 14 Brock Jaramillo- Senior
† Returning Starter......(S) 2008 Starter......(I) Injured			* Experienced Player

== Awards and honors ==
=== WAC Coach of the Year ===
Chris Petersen

=== WAC Freshman of the Year ===
Kellen Moore-QB

=== First Team All WAC ===
Jeremy Childs- Jr. WR- Second straight year on 1st team

Andrew Woodruff- Sr. OL

Ryan Winterswyk- So. DL

Ellis Powers-Sr. LB

Kyle Wilson- Jr. DB- 2007 2nd team

=== Second Team All WAC ===
Austin Pettis- So. WR

Kellen Moore- Fr. QB

Ian Johnson-Sr. RB- 2006 & 2007 1st team

Mike T. Williams- Sr. DL

Jeron Johnson- So. DB

Kyle Wilson- Jr. ST/KR

== Statistics ==
=== Team ===
	BSU	Opp
Scoring	473	147
Points per game	39.4	12.2
First downs	270	200
Rushing	1952	1259
Passing	3529	2275
Penalties-Yards	89-814	78-682
Total offense	5481	3534
Avg per game	456.8	294.5
Fumbles-Lost	25-14	19-11

	BSU	Opp
Punts-Yards	43-1903	71-2851
Avg per punt	44.3	40.2
Time of possession/Game	29:13	30:47
3rd down conversions	67-151	59-191
4th down conversions	9-13	9-33
Touchdowns scored	62	19
Field goals-Attempts	14-22	6-12
PAT-Attempts	59-60	15-17
Attendance	193,649	175,862
Games/Avg per Game	6-32,275	6-29,310

==== Scores by quarter ====
	1	2	3	4	Total
Boise State	78	179	138	78	473
Opponents	26	43	42	36	147

=== Offense ===
==== Rushing ====
Name	GP	Att	Yards	Avg	TD	Long	Avg/G
I. Johnson	12	143	738	5.2	12	69	61.5
J. Avery	12	109	613	5.6	4	57	51.1
D. Harper	12	51	259	5.0	4	29	21.6
V. Perretta	12	17	129	7.6	2	27	10.8
D. Martin	10	24	107	4.5	0	23	10.7
T. Young	3	5	52	10.4	2	24	17.3
T. Bissell	12	6	48	8.0	0	41	4.0
J. Hodge	7	12	46	3.8	0	8	6.6
B. Hamdan	7	3	7	2.3	0	6	1.0
R. Brockel	12	3	6	2.0	2	3	0.5
M. Coughlin	6	7	5	0.7	0	9	0.8
K. Moore	12	36	-20	-0.6	1	15	-1.7
TEAM	8	12	-38	-3.2	0	0	-4.8
Broncos Total	12	429	1952	4.6	27	69	162.7
Opponents	12	425	1259	3.0	7	60	104.9

==== Passing ====
Name	GP-GS	Cmp-Att	Pct	Yds	TD	INT	Lng	Avg/G	RAT
K. Moore	12-11	259-370	70.0	3264	25	9	80	272.0	161.53
B. Hamdan	7-1	10-20	50.0	115	1	1	22	16.4	104.80
M. Coughlin	6-0	3-5	60.0	25	1	0	13	4.2	168.00
T. Bissell	12-0	3-4	75.0	108	2	0	57	9.0	466.80
V. Perretta	12-0	1-1	100.0	17	1	0	17	1.5	572.80
A. Pettis	12-0	0-1	0.0	0	0	0	0	0	0.00
TEAM	8-0	0-2	0.0	0	0	0	0	0	0.00
Broncos Total	12	276-403	68.5	3529	30	10	80	294.1	161.65
Opponents	12	212-413	51.3	2275	8	20	81	189.6	94.31

==== Receiving ====
Name	GP	Rec	Yds	Avg	TD	Long	Avg/G
J. Childs	11	65	741	11.4	7	57	67.4
A. Pettis	12	45	502	11.2	9	24	41.8
V. Perretta	12	34	500	14.7	2	73	41.7
J. Hawkins	12	24	312	13.0	3	46	26.0
I. Johnson	12	19	234	12.3	0	51	19.5
K. Efaw	12	17	262	15.4	0	34	21.8
J. Avery	12	15	220	14.7	0	37	18.3
T. Young	3	10	168	16.8	1	80	56.0
C. O'Neill	4	10	131	13.1	2	44	32.8
R. Brockel	12	9	91	10.1	2	21	7.6
T. Shoemaker	12	7	110	15.7	2	56	9.2
T. Gallarda	12	6	65	10.8	2	16	5.4
T. Bissell	12	5	60	12.0	0	15	5.0
D.J. Harper	12	4	37	9.2	0	20	3.1
D. Martin	10	2	53	26.5	0	35	5.3
M. Choate	11	2	29	14.5	0	22	2.6
T. Franklin	10	2	14	7.0	0	8	1.4
Broncos Total	12	276	3529	12.8	30	80	294.1
Opponents	12	212	2275	10.7	8	81	189.6

=== Defense ===
Team	GP	Tackles				Sacks	Pass Defense		Interceptions				Fumbles		Blkd Kick
Team	GP	Solo	Ast	Total	TFL-Yds	No-Yds	BrUp	QBH	No.-Yds	Avg	TD	Long	Rcv-Yds-TD	FF	Blkd Kick
Total	12	505	336	841	83-349	34-248	56	6	20-110	5.5	0	30	11-49-2	13	4

=== Special teams ===
Team	Punting								Kickoffs				
Team	No.	Yds	Avg	Long	TB	FC	I20	Blkd	No.	Yds	Avg	TB	OB
Total	43	1903	44.3	75	6	2	15	0	88	5618	63.8	13	2

Team	Punt returns					Kick returns				
Team	No.	Yds	Avg	TD	Long	No.	Yds	Avg	TD	Long
Total	43	539	12.5	3	90	23	506	22.0	0	42
