= 2008 Utah State Aggies football team =

American college football season

2008 Utah State Aggies football
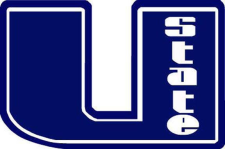
- Conference: Western Athletic Conference
- Record: 3–9 (3–5 WAC)
- Head coach: Brent Guy (4th season)
- Offensive coordinator: Darrell Dickey (2nd season)
- Defensive coordinator: Mark Johnson (4th season)
- Home stadium: Romney Stadium

2008 Western Athletic Conference football standings
	Conf.			Overall
Team	W		L	W		L
No. 11 Boise State $	8	–	0	12	–	1
Louisiana Tech	5	–	3	8	–	5
Nevada	5	–	3	7	–	6
Hawaii	5	–	3	7	–	7
Fresno State	4	–	4	7	–	6
San Jose State	4	–	4	6	–	6
Utah State	3	–	5	3	–	9
New Mexico State	1	–	7	3	–	9
Idaho	1	–	7	2	–	10
$ – Conference champion; Rankings from AP Poll

The 2008 Utah State Aggies football team represented Utah State University as a member of the Western Athletic Conference (WAC) in 2008 NCAA Division I FBS football season. The Aggies were led by fourth-year head coach Brent Guy and played their home games in Romney Stadium in Logan, Utah.

Guy was fired prior to the end of the season after the team compiled a 2–9 record. At Utah State, Guy never finished a season with more than three wins. He coached the Aggies in their final game, in which they defeated New Mexico State, 47–2, and completed their schedule with a 3–9 record.

== Schedule ==
Date	Time	Opponent	Site	TV	Result	Attendance
August 30	8:00 pm	at UNLV*	Sam Boyd Stadium; Las Vegas, NV		L 27–17	18,815
September 6	1:30 pm	at No. 18 Oregon*	Autzen Stadium; Eugene, OR		L 66–24	58,060
September 13	6:00 pm	No. 22 Utah*	Romney Stadium; Logan, UT (Battle of the Brothers)	KJZZ	L 58–10	19,061
September 20	2:00 pm	Idaho	Romney Stadium; Logan, UT	Altitude	W 42–17	10,154
October 3	6:00 pm	No. 8 BYU*	Romney Stadium; Logan, UT (Beehive Boot / Old Wagon Wheel)	KJZZ	L 34–14	23,101
October 11	5:30 pm	at San Jose State	Spartan Stadium; San Jose, CA	ESPNU	L 30–7	20,318
October 18	2:05 pm	at Nevada	Mackay Stadium; Reno, NV		L 44–17	13,159
October 25	1:00 pm	Fresno State	Romney Stadium; Logan, UT	KJZZ	L 30–28	14,071
November 1	1:00 pm	Hawaii	Romney Stadium; Logan, UT	Altitude	W 30–14	12,112
November 8	12:00 pm	at No. 10 Boise State	Bronco Stadium; Boise, ID	ESPN GamePlan	L 49–14	32,171
November 15	12:30 pm	at Louisiana Tech	Joe Aillet Stadium; Ruston, LA		L 45–38	15,320
November 29	1:00 pm	New Mexico State	Romney Stadium; Logan, UT		W 47–2	9,919
*Non-conference game; Rankings from Coaches' Poll released prior to the game; All times are in Mountain time
