= 2008 San Jose State Spartans football team =

American college football season

2008 San Jose State Spartans football
- Conference: Western Athletic Conference
- Record: 6–6 (4–4 WAC)
- Head coach: Dick Tomey (4th season)
- Co-offensive coordinators: Marcus Arroyo (1st season); Steve Morton (2nd season)
- Offensive scheme: West Coast
- Defensive coordinator: Keith Burns (2nd season)
- Base defense: 4–3
- Home stadium: Spartan Stadium

2008 Western Athletic Conference football standings
	Conf.			Overall
Team	W		L	W		L
No. 11 Boise State $	8	–	0	12	–	1
Louisiana Tech	5	–	3	8	–	5
Nevada	5	–	3	7	–	6
Hawaii	5	–	3	7	–	7
Fresno State	4	–	4	7	–	6
San Jose State	4	–	4	6	–	6
Utah State	3	–	5	3	–	9
New Mexico State	1	–	7	3	–	9
Idaho	1	–	7	2	–	10
$ – Conference champion; Rankings from AP Poll

The 2008 San Jose State Spartans football team represented San Jose State University in the 2008 NCAA Division I FBS football season. This season was the Spartans' fourth season with Dick Tomey as head coach. Despite being bowl eligible, the Spartans were not invited to a bowl game.

== Schedule ==
Date	Time	Opponent	Site	TV	Result	Attendance
August 30	5:00 pm	UC Davis*	Spartan Stadium; San Jose, CA		W 13–10	18,730
September 6	9:30 am	at Nebraska*	Memorial Stadium; Lincoln, NE	FSN	L 12–35	84,146
September 13	5:00 pm	San Diego State*	Spartan Stadium; San Jose, CA		W 35–10	19,854
September 20	6:00 pm	at Stanford*	Stanford Stadium; Stanford, CA (Bill Walsh Legacy Game)		L 10–23	33,293
September 26	9:05 pm	at Hawaii	Aloha Stadium; Honolulu, HI (Dick Tomey Legacy Game)		W 20–17	40,571
October 11	4:30 pm	Utah State^{†}	Spartan Stadium; San Jose, CA	ESPNU	W 30–7	20,318
October 18/	6:00 pm	at New Mexico State	Aggie Memorial Stadium; Las Cruces, NM	ESPN GamePlan	W 31–14	20,607
October 24	6:00 pm	No. 13 Boise State	Spartan Stadium; San Jose, CA	ESPN2	L 16–33	26,258
November 1	2:00 pm	at Idaho	Kibbie Dome; Moscow, ID		W 30–24	15,002
November 8	5:00 pm	at Louisiana Tech	Spartan Stadium; San Jose, CA		L 0–21	16,170
November 15	1:05 pm	at Nevada	Mackay Stadium; Reno, NV		L 17–41	14,343
November 21	6:30 pm	Fresno State	Spartan Stadium; San Jose, CA (rivalry)	ESPN2	L 10–24	24,384
*Non-conference game; ^{†}Homecoming; Rankings from AP Poll released prior to the game; All times are in Pacific time

== Game summaries ==
=== UC Davis ===
	1	2	3	4	Total
Aggies	10	0	0	0	10
Spartans	0	0	6	7	13

=== At Nebraska ===
	1	2	3	4	Total
Spartans	6	3	0	3	12
Cornhuskers	14	0	0	21	35

=== San Diego State ===
	1	2	3	4	Total
Aztecs	0	7	3	0	10
Spartans	7	14	0	14	35

=== At Stanford ===
	1	2	3	4	Total
Spartans	3	7	0	0	10
Cardinal	0	7	6	10	23

=== At Hawaii ===
	1	2	3	4	Total
Spartans	7	0	7	6	20
Warriors	7	10	0	0	17

=== Utah State ===
	1	2	3	4	Total
Aggies	0	0	0	7	7
Spartans	0	21	9	0	30

=== At New Mexico State ===
	1	2	3	4	Total
Spartans	14	7	0	10	31
Aggies	0	7	0	7	14

=== No. 13 Boise State ===
	1	2	3	4	Total
No. 13 Broncos	6	14	3	10	33
Spartans	6	3	7	0	16

=== At Idaho ===
	1	2	3	4	Total
Spartans	7	13	10	0	30
Vandals	7	3	0	14	24

=== Louisiana Tech ===
	1	2	3	4	Total
Bulldogs	0	14	0	7	21
Spartans	0	0	0	0	0

=== At Nevada ===
	1	2	3	4	Total
Spartans	0	3	14	0	17
Wolf Pack	3	14	14	10	41

=== Fresno State ===
	1	2	3	4	Total
Bulldogs	3	0	7	14	24
Spartans	7	3	0	0	10
