= 2008 New Mexico Bowl =

American college football game

Colorado State Rams	Fresno State Bulldogs
(6–6)	(7–5)
Mountain West	WAC
40	35
Head coach: Steve Fairchild	Head coach: Pat Hill
	1	2	3	4	Total
Colorado State	10	10	0	20	40
Fresno State	14	7	7	7	35
- Date: December 20, 2008
- Season: 2008
- Stadium: University Stadium
- Location: Albuquerque, New Mexico
- MVP: RB Gartrell Johnson, CSU (Offensive); DE Tommie Hill, CSU (Defensive)
- Favorite: Fresno State by 3
- Referee: Gil Gelbke (C-USA)
- Attendance: 24,735
- Payout: US$750,000 per team

United States TV coverage
- Network: ESPN
- Announcers: Joe Tessitore, Rod Gilmore
- Nielsen ratings: 2.2

The 2008 New Mexico Bowl was a post-season American college football bowl game held on December 20, 2008, at University Stadium on the campus of the University of New Mexico in Albuquerque as part of the 2008-09 NCAA Bowl season. The game, telecast on ESPN, featured the Colorado State Rams from the Mountain West Conference and the Fresno State Bulldogs from the WAC. The two teams were rivals when Colorado State was in the WAC from 1968 to 1998.

Colorado State scored 20 points in the fourth quarter to defeat Fresno State, 40–35 behind running back Gartrell Johnson's 375 rushing and receiving yards, an NCAA bowl record.

== Game summary ==
=== Scoring summary ===
Quarter	1	2	3	4	Total
Colorado State	10	10	0	20	40
Fresno State	14	7	7	7	35

at University Stadium, Albuquerque, New Mexico

- Date: December 20, 2008
- Game time: 2:30 p.m. EST
- 1st Quarter
  - FRES – Lonyae Miller 1-yard run (Kevin Goessling kick), 11:46. Fresno State 7–0. Drive: 7 plays, 72 yards, 3:14.
  - CSU – Grant Stucker 18-yard run (Jason Smith kick), 09:37. Colorado State 7-7. Drive: 4 plays, 84 yards, 2:09.
  - FRES – Anthony Harding 2-yard run (Kevin Goessling kick), 06:35. Fresno State 14–7. Drive: 7 plays, 73 yards, 3:02.
  - CSU – Jason Smith 29-yard field goal, 02:57. Fresno State 14–10. Drive: 9 plays, 66 yards, 3:38.
- 2nd Quarter
  - CSU – Jason Smith 22-yard field goal, 05:50. Fresno State 14–13. Drive: 10 plays, 75 yards, 5:35.
  - FRES – Lonyae Miller 69-yard run (Kevin Goessling kick), 04:26. Fresno State 21–13. Drive: 4 plays, 80 yards, 1:24.
  - CSU – Kory Sperry 22-yard pass from Billy Ferris (Jason Smith kick), 00:02. Fresno State 21–20. Drive: 12 plays, 87 yards, 4:24.
- 3rd Quarter
  - FRES – Anthony Harding 2-yard run (Kevin Goessling kick), 08:31. Fresno State 28–20. Drive: 7 plays, 59 yards, 3:51.
- 4th Quarter
  - CSU – Gartrell Johnson 1-yard run (Johnson run failed), 09:45. Fresno State 28–26. Drive: 7 plays, 32 yards, 3:41.
  - CSU – Rashaun Greer 69-yard pass from Billy Ferris (Jason Smith kick), 07:00. Colorado State 33–28. Drive: 3 plays, 73 yards, 1:07.
  - CSU – Gartrell Johnson 77-yard run (Johnson run failed), 01:46. Colorado State 40–28. Drive: 2 plays, 85 yards, 0:57.
  - FRES – Ryan Skidmore 7-yard pass from Tom Brandstater (Kevin Goessling kick), 00:55. Colorado State 40–35. Drive: 5 plays, 59 yards, 0:51.

== Game Notes ==
- Gartrell Johnson set an FBS bowl game record for yards from scrimmage with 375
- Johnson's 285 rushing yards were second most in FBS bowl history (P.J. Daniels, 307 in 2003)
- Johnson's rushing performance ranked second in Colorado State history
- Colorado State won their first bowl game since 2001
