= 2008 Louisiana Tech Bulldogs football team =

American college football season

2008 Louisiana Tech Bulldogs football

Independence Bowl champion

Independence Bowl, W 17–10 vs. Northern Illinois
- Conference: Western Athletic Conference
- Record: 8–5 (5–3 WAC)
- Head coach: Derek Dooley (2nd season)
- Offensive coordinator: Frank Scelfo (2nd season)
- Offensive scheme: Multiple pro-style
- Defensive coordinator: Tommy Spangler (2nd season)
- Base defense: 4–3
- Captains: Weldon Brown; Quin Harris; Daniel Porter
- Home stadium: Joe Aillet Stadium

2008 Western Athletic Conference football standings
	Conf.			Overall
Team	W		L	W		L
No. 11 Boise State $	8	–	0	12	–	1
Louisiana Tech	5	–	3	8	–	5
Nevada	5	–	3	7	–	6
Hawaii	5	–	3	7	–	7
Fresno State	4	–	4	7	–	6
San Jose State	4	–	4	6	–	6
Utah State	3	–	5	3	–	9
New Mexico State	1	–	7	3	–	9
Idaho	1	–	7	2	–	10
$ – Conference champion; Rankings from AP Poll

The 2008 Louisiana Tech Bulldogs football team represented Louisiana Tech University as a member of the Western Athletic Conference (WAC) during the 2008 NCAA Division I FBS football season. Led by second-year head coach Derek Dooley, the Bulldogs played their home games at Joe Aillet Stadium in Ruston, Louisiana. Dooley's Bulldogs entered the season after finishing 5–7 (4–4 WAC) in 2007. Louisiana Tech kicked off the season with a victory over Mississippi State, finished tied for second place in the WAC, and capped off the year with an Independence Bowl victory over Northern Illinois.

== Before the season ==
=== Recruiting ===
College recruiting information (2008)
Name	Hometown	School	Height	Weight	40^{‡}	Commit date
Taylor Bennett; QB	St. Louis, MO	Georgia Tech	6 ft 3 in (1.91 m)	214 lb (97 kg)	4.75	Transfer
Taylor Bennett; QB	Recruit ratings: Scout: Rivals: (N/A)					
Colby Cameron; QB	Newbury Park, CA	Newbury Park	6 ft 2 in (1.88 m)	167 lb (76 kg)	-	Mar 27, 2008
Colby Cameron; QB	Recruit ratings: Scout: Rivals: (N/A)					
Richie Casey; WR	Homer, LA	Homer	6 ft 0 in (1.83 m)	181 lb (82 kg)	4.60	Dec 17, 2007
Richie Casey; WR	Recruit ratings: Scout: Rivals: (40)					
Adrien Cole; LB	Mobile, AL	McGill-Toolen	5 ft 11 in (1.80 m)	209 lb (95 kg)	4.50	Jan 4, 2008
Adrien Cole; LB	Recruit ratings: Scout: Rivals: (40)					
Jimmie Crawford; DB	Harvey, LA	West Jefferson	6 ft 0 in (1.83 m)	184 lb (83 kg)	4.63	Feb 20, 2008
Jimmie Crawford; DB	Recruit ratings: Scout: Rivals: (40)					
Eric Fiege; WR	Santee, CA	West Hills	5 ft 9 in (1.75 m)	165 lb (75 kg)	4.49	Feb 15, 2008
Eric Fiege; WR	Recruit ratings: Scout: (N/A)					
Scott Gonzalez; OL	Katy, TX	Mayde Creek	6 ft 3 in (1.91 m)	311 lb (141 kg)	-	Jun 30, 2008
Scott Gonzalez; OL	Recruit ratings: (N/A)					
Eric Harper; DE	Marrero, LA	John Ehret	6 ft 4 in (1.93 m)	223 lb (101 kg)	4.65	Jan 30, 2008
Eric Harper; DE	Recruit ratings: Scout: Rivals: (77)					
Kwame Jordan; DE	Fort Scott, KS	Fort Scott	6 ft 5 in (1.96 m)	233 lb (106 kg)	4.77	Dec 19, 2007
Kwame Jordan; DE	Recruit ratings: Scout: Rivals: (N/A)					
Christian Lacey; DE	Harvey, LA	Shaw	6 ft 3 in (1.91 m)	230 lb (100 kg)	4.70	Dec 16, 2007
Christian Lacey; DE	Recruit ratings: Scout: Rivals: (73)					
Michael Lacy; OL	Gulfport, MS	Gulfport	6 ft 6 in (1.98 m)	315 lb (143 kg)	5.40	Jan 12, 2008
Michael Lacy; OL	Recruit ratings: Scout: Rivals: (77)					
Phillip Longino; DT	Missouri City, TX	Marshall	6 ft 0 in (1.83 m)	274 lb (124 kg)	5.30	Jan 2, 2008
Phillip Longino; DT	Recruit ratings: Scout: Rivals: (40)					
Josh Parrish; OL	Klein, TX	Klein Collins	6 ft 4 in (1.93 m)	275 lb (125 kg)	4.90	Jan 31, 2008
Josh Parrish; OL	Recruit ratings: Scout: Rivals: (40)					
Solomon Randle; LB	Mobile, AL	LeFlore	6 ft 0 in (1.83 m)	217 lb (98 kg)	4.70	Jan 29, 2008
Solomon Randle; LB	Recruit ratings: Scout: Rivals: (40)					
Kevin Saia; OL	Geismar, LA	Dutchtown	6 ft 2 in (1.88 m)	296 lb (134 kg)	5.25	Sep 27, 2007
Kevin Saia; OL	Recruit ratings: Scout: Rivals: (74)					
Chandler Spence; TE	Arlington, TX	Lamar	6 ft 5 in (1.96 m)	233 lb (106 kg)	4.77	Dec 18, 2007
Chandler Spence; TE	Recruit ratings: Scout: Rivals: (77)					
Todd Spence; DB	Lewisville, TX	Lewisville	6 ft 1 in (1.85 m)	163 lb (74 kg)	4.50	Dec 12, 2007
Todd Spence; DB	Recruit ratings: Scout: Rivals: (40)					
Ketaraus Stanton; RB	Diboll, TX	Diboll	6 ft 2 in (1.88 m)	208 lb (94 kg)	4.53	Jan 20, 2008
Ketaraus Stanton; RB	Recruit ratings: Scout: Rivals: (40)					
R.P. Stuart; WR	Austin, TX	Anderson	6 ft 3 in (1.91 m)	202 lb (92 kg)	4.56	Dec 22, 2007
R.P. Stuart; WR	Recruit ratings: Scout: Rivals: (40)					
Zack Summage; DB	Shreveport, LA	Evangel	5 ft 9 in (1.75 m)	190 lb (86 kg)	4.65	Feb 15, 2008
Zack Summage; DB	Recruit ratings: Scout: (N/A)					
Darrius Terry; DB	Lufkin, TX	Lufkin	6 ft 0 in (1.83 m)	183 lb (83 kg)	-	Jan 19, 2008
Darrius Terry; DB	Recruit ratings: Scout: Rivals: (45)					
Houston Tuminello; WR	Gilmer, TX	Gilmer	6 ft 2 in (1.88 m)	184 lb (83 kg)	4.63	Aug 11, 2007
Houston Tuminello; WR	Recruit ratings: Scout: Rivals: (74)					
Cruz Williams; WR	Little Rock, AR	Pulaski	6 ft 4 in (1.93 m)	201 lb (91 kg)	4.45	Jun 11, 2008
Cruz Williams; WR	Recruit ratings: Scout: Rivals: (79)					
Overall recruit ranking: Scout: 96 Rivals: 74
‡ Refers to 40-yard dash; Note: In many cases, Scout, Rivals, 247Sports, On3, and ESPN may conflict in their listings of height, weight and 40 time.; In these cases, the average was taken. ESPN grades are on a 100-point scale.; Sources: "2008 Team Ranking". Rivals.com.

=== T-Day spring game ===
	1	2	3	4	Total
White	0	0	0	14	14
Blue	0	6	7	0	13

On April 12, 2008, the White Team came from behind to beat the Blue Team 14–13 at Joe Aillet Stadium. Defense dominated the first half as neither team's offense could muster a score. With nine seconds remaining in the second quarter, the Blue Team's Jay Dudley blocked a Brad Oestricher field goal attempt, and Brian White recovered the ball and ran 71 yards for a touchdown. The extra point was missed, and the Blue Team went into the locker room with a 6–0 halftime lead. In the third quarter, the Blue Team extended their lead to 13–0 on a trick play as TE Dennis Morris tossed a touchdown pass to WR Philip Beck. Just seconds into the fourth quarter, RB William Griffin rushed for a three-yard touchdown for the White Team's first score of the game. Later in the fourth quarter, QB Ross Jenkins connected on a thirty-yard touchdown pass to WR Phillip Livas to complete the White Team's 14–13 comeback win. LB Quin Harris led the White Team with four tackles including a sack. Josh Victorian had 3.5 tackles and pulled in an interception. The Blue Team's D'Anthony Smith had four tackles on the day with two sacks. Shawn Simmons led the Blue Team with 8.5 tackles. LB Jay Dudley had 5.5 tackles with a sack. Brian White added an interception to go with his return for a touchdown, and safety Deon Young added another interception.

== Schedule ==
Date	Time	Opponent	Site	TV	Result	Attendance
August 30	5:45 p.m.	Mississippi State*	Joe Aillet Stadium; Ruston, LA	ESPN2	W 22–14	25,224
September 6	6:10 p.m.	at No. 14 Kansas*	Memorial Stadium; Lawrence, KS	FSN	L 0–29	48,621
September 20	6:00 p.m.	Southeastern Louisiana*	Joe Aillet Stadium; Ruston, LA		W 41–26	17,623
October 1	7:00 p.m.	at No. 17 Boise State	Bronco Stadium; Boise, ID	ESPN	L 3–38	32,071
October 11	11:05 p.m.	at Hawaii	Aloha Stadium; Honolulu, HI	KFVE	L 14–24	40,246
October 18	6:00 p.m.	Idaho	Joe Aillet Stadium; Ruston, LA		W 46–14	12,400
October 25	12:00 p.m.	at Army*	Michie Stadium; West Point, NY	ESPN360	L 7–14	27,383
November 1	1:30 p.m.	Fresno State^{†}	Joe Aillet Stadium; Ruston, LA	KFRE-TV	W 38–35	20,300
November 8	7:00 p.m.	at San Jose State	Spartan Stadium; San Jose, CA		W 21–0	16,170
November 15	1:30 p.m.	Utah State	Joe Aillet Stadium; Ruston, LA		W 45–38	15,320
November 22	3:00 p.m.	at New Mexico State	Aggie Memorial Stadium; Las Cruces, NM		W 35–31	17,426
November 29	1:30 p.m.	Nevada	Joe Aillet Stadium; Ruston, LA		L 31–35	17,254
December 28	7:15 p.m.	vs. Northern Illinois	Independence Stadium; Shreveport, LA (Independence Bowl)	ESPN	W 17–10	41,567
*Non-conference game; ^{†}Homecoming; Rankings from AP Poll released prior to the game; All times are in Central time

== Coaching staff ==
Position	Name	Year at Tech	Alma mater
Head football coach / athletics director	Derek Dooley	2nd	Virginia '90
Offensive coordinator / quarterbacks	Frank Scelfo	2nd	Louisiana-Monroe '81
Defensive coordinator	Tommy Spangler	2nd	Georgia '84
Defensive line	Jimmy Brumbaugh	1st	Auburn '03
Linebackers	Stan Eggen	1st	Moorhead State '77
Running backs	Chino Fontenette	2nd	Tulane '03
Wide receivers	Conroy Hines	15th	Louisiana Tech '89
Defensive backs / recruiting coordinator	Terry Joseph	2nd	Northwestern State '96
Offensive line (interim)	Art Kehoe	1st	Miami '82
Special teams / tight ends	Eric Russell	2nd	Idaho '91
Head strength and conditioning coach	Damon Harrington	5th	Louisiana Tech '00
Character education coordinator / Assistant strength and conditioning coach	Ed Jackson	16th	Louisiana Tech '83
Graduate assistant	Ben Larson	2nd	Susquehanna '05
Graduate assistant (defense)	Ryan Fournier	1st	Southeastern Louisiana '06
Graduate assistant	Aaron Lips	1st	Louisiana Tech '05
Videoo operations	David Snyder	1st	Clemson '05

== Game summaries ==
=== Mississippi State ===
	1	2	3	4	Total
Miss. St.	7	7	0	0	14
LA Tech	3	6	10	3	22

=== Kansas ===
	1	2	3	4	Total
LA Tech	0	0	0	0	0
Kansas	3	10	16	0	29

=== Southeastern Louisiana ===
	1	2	3	4	Total
SELU	10	13	0	3	26
LA Tech	14	14	10	3	41

=== Boise State ===
	1	2	3	4	Total
LA Tech	0	3	0	0	3
Boise St.	7	14	10	7	38

=== Hawaii ===
	1	2	3	4	Total
LA Tech	0	7	0	7	14
Hawaii	7	14	3	0	24

=== Idaho ===
	1	2	3	4	Total
Idaho	7	7	0	0	14
LA Tech	9	24	10	3	46

=== Army ===
	1	2	3	4	Total
LA Tech	0	0	7	0	7
Army	7	0	0	7	14

=== Fresno State ===
	1	2	3	4	Total
Fresno St.	7	14	7	7	35
LA Tech	7	7	10	14	38

=== San Jose State ===
	1	2	3	4	Total
LA Tech	0	14	0	7	21
SJSU	0	0	0	0	0

=== Utah State ===
	1	2	3	4	Total
Utah St.	10	7	13	8	38
LA Tech	7	21	7	10	45

=== New Mexico State ===
	1	2	3	4	Total
LA Tech	7	21	0	7	35
NM State	0	17	7	7	31

=== Nevada ===
	1	2	3	4	Total
Nevada	0	7	14	14	35
LA Tech	7	10	14	0	31

=== Northern Illinois ===
	1	2	3	4	Total
NIU	7	0	3	0	10
LA Tech	7	7	3	0	17

== Statistics ==
=== Team ===
	Tech	Opp
Scoring	320	308
Points per game	24.6	23.7
First downs	234	255
Rushing	138	71
Passing	78	166
Penalty	18	18
Total offense	4460	4895
Avg per play	5.2	5.4
Avg per game	343.1	376.5
Fumbles-Lost	23-10	20-12
Penalties-Yards	79-683	77-651
Avg per game	52.5	50.1

	Tech	Opp
Punts-Yards	72-2915	75-2772
Avg per punt	40.5	37.0
Time of possession/Game	28:46	31:14
3rd down conversions	62/189	73/193
4th down conversions	6/19	10/21
Touchdowns scored	40	39
Field goals-Attempts-Long	14-28-50	12-14-49
PAT-Attempts	38-40	36-37
Attendance	108,121	181,917
Games/Avg per Game	6/18,020	7/31,926

==== Scores by quarter ====
	1	2	3	4	Total
Opponents	72	110	73	53	308
LA Tech	61	134	71	54	320

=== Offense ===
==== Rushing ====
Name	GP-GS	Att	Gain	Loss	Net	Avg	TD	Long	Avg/G
Daniel Porter	13	222	1262	98	1164	5.2	9	43	89.5
Patrick Jackson	13	143	676	23	653	4.6	8	24	50.2
Phillip Livas	13	30	342	5	337	11.2	2	78	25.9
R.P. Stuart	13	9	87	8	79	8.8	2	21	5.6
Myke Compton	12	21	96	22	74	3.5	1	20	6.2
Ross Jenkins	11	61	196	140	56	0.9	1	19	5.1
Taylor Bennett	7	20	82	27	55	2.8	0	20	7.9
Allen Gilbert	2	3	17	0	17	5.7	0	7	8.5
Quin Harris	10	1	6	0	6	6.0	0	6	0.6
Chris Keagle	13	1	4	0	4	4.0	0	4	0.3
Shane Womack	10	1	0	2	-2	-2.0	0	0	-0.2
Team	8	11	0	11	-11	-1.0	0	0	-1.4
Total	13	523	2768	336	2432	4.7	23	78	187.1

==== Passing ====
Name	GP-GS	Effic	Att-Cmp-Int	Pct	Yds	TD	Lng	Avg/G
Ross Jenkins	11	118.46	174-92-3	52.9	1155	7	68	105.0
Taylor Bennett	7	80.20	167-66-6	39.5	873	2	57	124.7
Team	8	0.00	1-0-0	0.0	0	0	0	0.0
Patrick Jackson	13	-200.00	1-0-1	0.0	0	0	0	0.0
Total	13	98.56	343-158-10	46.1	2028	9	68	156.0

==== Receiving ====
Name	GP-GS	No.	Yds	Avg	TD	Long	Avg/G
Phillip Livas	13	43	607	14.1	2	68	46.7
Philip Beck	13	25	268	10.7	0	53	20.6
Patrick Jackson	13	16	196	12.2	3	34	15.1
Daniel Porter	13	12	181	15.1	1	44	13.9
Houston Tuminello	11	12	117	9.8	0	16	10.6
Anthony Harrison	13	9	101	11.2	0	32	7.8
Shane Womack	10	8	109	13.6	1	26	10.9
Dennis Morris	12	7	158	22.6	1	60	13.2
Dustin Mitchell	13	7	112	16.0	1	35	8.6
R.P. Stuart	13	7	58	8.3	0	14	4.1
Josh Wheeler	2	4	63	15.8	0	39	31.5
Myke Compton	12	3	6	2.0	0	4	0.5
Adrian Linwood	4	2	48	24.0	0	34	12.0
Eric Fiege	4	2	12	6.0	0	8	3.0
Ross Jenkins	11	1	-8	-8.0	0	0	-0.7
Total	13	158	2028	12.8	9	68	156.0

=== Defense ===
Name	GP	Tackles				Sacks	Pass defense		Interceptions				Fumbles		Blkd Kick
Name	GP	Solo	Ast	Total	TFL-Yds	No-Yds	BrUp	QBH	No.-Yds	Avg	TD	Long	Rcv-Yds	FF	Blkd Kick
Antonio Baker	13	63	52	115	4.5-16		4		3-9	3.0	0	3	2-0	3	1
Weldon Brown	13	49	26	75	1.5-5	0.5-3	6	2	5-10	2.0	0	8	1-0	2	
D'Anthony Smith	13	27	38	65	8.0-45	5.0-41	3	3							
Brannon Jackson	13	29	35	64	3.5-12	2.5-11	1	2						2	
Stevon Howze	13	37	24	61	1.0-1		10		1-19	19.0	0	19			
Deon Young	13	33	26	59			7		3-42	14.0	0	42			
Tarence Calais	13	28	22	50	3.0-3	1.0-1								1	
Quin Harris	10	19	30	49	1.0-4	0.5-3	1	2	1-0	0.0	0	0	1-0		
Dominique Faust	12	18	24	42	4.5-38	3.0-36	2	1	1-60	60.0	1	60			
Mason Hitt	13	8	26	34	4.5-14	2.5-9	1	1							
Jared Barron	13	13	20	33	7.0-20	2.5-11		1					1-0		
Kiamni Washington	13	15	16	31	1.0-1		2	1						1	1
Adrien Cole	10	14	16	30	1.0-3										
Terry Carter	13	16	12	28			2		2-50	25.0	1	50	1-6	1	
Matt Broha	13	12	15	27	3.5-7	1.5-5	3	1	1-40	40.0	1	40			
Brian White	5	7	12	19	2.0-7	0.5-5	1	1							
Kwame Jordan	8	5	11	16	6.0-27	3.5-16		1							
Adrian Logan	10	10	5	15	2.5-4										
Myke Compton	12	6	9	15											
Nolan Darby	6	1	12	13	2.0-3	0.5-1									
Christian Lacey	8	6	6	12	5.0-26	4.0-24		1							
Josh Victorian	9	7	4	11			3								
Randy Grigsby	9	6	5	11	1.5-7	0.5-4									
Breon Jackson	8	3	8	11	1.0-1										
Dusty Rust	9	3	6	9											
Keith Brown	11	5	3	8									1-0		1
Alex Anderson	11	5	2	7											1
Jay Dudley	4	2	4	6											
Eric Harper	6	2	3	5	1.0-2										
Dustin Mitchell	13	3	2	5											
Anthony Harrison	13	4		4									2-0		
Darrius Terry	8	2	1	3			2						1-0	1	
Philip Longino	5		3	3									1-0		
Thomas Graham	10	1	1	2											
R.P. Stuart	13	1	1	2											
Daniel Porter	13	1	1	2											
Shawn Simmons	5		2	2											
Phillip Livas	13	1		1											
Brad Oestriecher	13	1		1											
Taylor Bennett	7	1		1											
Drexel Perkins	3	1		1											
Roosevelt Falls	3												1-0		
Allen Gilbert	2														1
Total	13	465	483	948	65-246	27-168	48	17	17-230	13.5	3	60	12-6	11	5

=== Special teams ===
Name	Punting								Kickoffs				
Name	No.	Yds	Avg	Long	TB	FC	I20	Blkd	No.	Yds	Avg	TB	OB
Chris Keagle	72	2915	40.5	59	7	15	27	0					
Brad Oestriecher									66	4051	61.4	5	2
Total	72	2915	40.5	59	7	15	27	0	66	4051	61.4	5	2

Name	Punt returns					Kick returns				
Name	No.	Yds	Avg	TD	Long	No.	Yds	Avg	TD	Long
Phillip Livas	16	245	15.3	2	81	32	826	25.8	1	97
Philip Beck	12	127	10.6	0	28	13	324	24.9	0	40
Keith Brown	1	23	23.0	0	0					
Antonio Baker	1	5	5.0	0	0					
Stevon Howze	1	0	0.0	0	0					
Alex Anderson	0	2	0.0	1	2					
Dennis Morris						2	14	7.0	0	9
Weldon Brown						1	24	24.0	0	24
Patrick Jackson						1	24	24.0	0	24
Dustin Mitchell						1	6	6.0	0	6
R.P. Stuart						1	0	0.0	0	0
Total	31	402	13.0	3	81	51	1218	23.9	1	97
