= 2008 Fresno State Bulldogs football team =

American college football season

2008 Fresno State Bulldogs football

New Mexico Bowl, L 35–40 vs. Colorado State
- Conference: Western Athletic Conference
- Record: 7–6 (4–4 WAC)
- Head coach: Pat Hill (12th season)
- Offensive coordinator: Doug Nussmeier (1st season)
- Offensive scheme: Pro-style
- Defensive coordinator: Dan Brown (8th season)
- Base defense: 4–3
- Home stadium: Bulldog Stadium (Capacity: 41,031)

2008 Western Athletic Conference football standings
	Conf.			Overall
Team	W		L	W		L
No. 11 Boise State $	8	–	0	12	–	1
Louisiana Tech	5	–	3	8	–	5
Nevada	5	–	3	7	–	6
Hawaii	5	–	3	7	–	7
Fresno State	4	–	4	7	–	6
San Jose State	4	–	4	6	–	6
Utah State	3	–	5	3	–	9
New Mexico State	1	–	7	3	–	9
Idaho	1	–	7	2	–	10
$ – Conference champion; Rankings from AP Poll

The 2008 Fresno State football team (variously "Fresno State" or "the 'Dogs") represented California State University, Fresno in the 2008 NCAA Division I FBS football season. The team was coached by 12th-year head coach Pat Hill, who had a contract lasting through the 2010 season. This season was the Bulldogs' 28th in their current home of Bulldog Stadium in Fresno, California.

== Preseason ==
The Bulldogs has enjoyed success as one of the most highly regarded BCS non-AQ conference schools in the country in the previous decade. The 2007 team finished with 9 wins, 4 losses, including a victory in the 2007 Humanitarian Bowl. The annual spring game for the 2008 season took place on April 18, and the Bulldogs concluded spring drills on April 21.

Going into the summer, the Bulldogs already began to draw attention to their team in the post-spring preseason polls released by sports pundits, drawn to the large number of returning starters, along with the impressive finish, beating the Georgia Tech in the 2007 Humanitarian Bowl to finish the season with a record of 9-4. Athlon has released their preseason 25 poll with the Bulldogs listed ranked #25; Dennis Dodd of CBS Sportsline has ranked the team at #24; and Mark Schlabach of ESPN placed the Bulldogs in the #21 spot.

At the end of the 2007 season, former offensive coordinator Jim McElwain resigned to accept the coaching position of offensive coordinator at Alabama, replacing former Texas Longhorn Major Applewhite. On February 28, 2008, Fresno State announced the hire of Doug Nussmeier as the Offensive Coordinator at Fresno State.

== Personnel ==
=== Coaching staff ===
Name	Position	Seasons at Fresno State	Alma mater
Pat Hill	Head coach	12th as HC; 18th overall	UC Riverside (1973)
Doug Nussmeier	Offensive coordinator	1st	Idaho (1994)
Dan Brown	Defensive coordinator	11th	
Jeff Grady	Tight Ends	2nd	
John Baxter	Special Teams/Wide Receivers/Assistant Head Coach	12th	Loras College
Will Plemons	Linebackers	1st	
Kerry Locklin	Defensive line	9th	New Mexico State (1982)
Tim Skipper	Running backs	3rd	Fresno State (2001)
Randy Stewart	Secondary	2nd	
Derek Frazier	Offensive line	2nd	
Mike Kelly	Graduate Assistant	1st	
Mike Schepers	Graduate Assistant	1st	

=== Depth chart ===
Defensive starters

FS
Marvin Haynes
Jake Jorde

CB
Damion Owens
Will Harding

WLB	MLB	SLB
Qaadir Brown	Ben Jacobs	Nico Herron
Ricky Pemasa	Nico Herron	Nick Bates

DE	DT	DT	DE
Wilson Ramos, Jr	Cornell Banks	Jon Monga	Ikenna Ike
Chris Carter	Bryce Harris	Mark Roberts	Chris Lewis

SS
Mosses Harris
Lorne Bell

CB
A.J. Jefferson
Sharrod Davis

Offensive starters

WR
Chastin West
Jason Crawley

LT	LG	C	RG	RT
Bobby Lepori	Cole Popovich	Joe Bernardi	Andrew Jackson	Kenny Avon
Kenny Wiggins	Pierce Masse	Richard Pacheco	Adam McDowell	Devan Cunningham

TE
Bear Pascoe
Isaac Kitner

WR
Marlon Moore
Seyi Ajirotutu

QB
Tom Brandstater
Ryan Colburn

FB
Anthony Harding
Reynard Camp

RB
Ryan Mathews
Lonyae Miller

== Schedule ==
Date	Time	Opponent	Rank	Site	TV	Result	Attendance
September 1	1:30 pm	at Rutgers*		Rutgers Stadium; Piscataway, NJ	ESPN	W 24–7	42,508
September 13	7:30 p.m.	No. 10 Wisconsin*	No. 21	Bulldog Stadium; Fresno, CA	ESPN2	L 10–13	42,387
September 20	5:15 pm	at Toledo*	No. 25	Glass Bowl; Toledo, OH	ESPNU	W 55–54 ^{2OT}	20,096
September 27	12:30 pm	at UCLA*	No. 22	Rose Bowl; Pasadena, CA	ABC	W 36–31	73,963
October 4	7:00 pm	Hawaii	No. 22	Bulldog Stadium; Fresno, CA (rivalry)		L 29–32 ^{OT}	40,572
October 11	7:00 pm	Idaho^{†}		Bulldog Stadium; Fresno, CA		W 45–32	37,015
October 25	12:00 pm	at Utah State		Romney Stadium; Logan, UT		W 30–28	14,071
November 1	11:30 am	at Louisiana Tech		Joe Aillet Stadium; Ruston, LA		L 35–38	20,300
November 7	6:00 pm	Nevada		Bulldog Stadium; Fresno, CA	ESPN2	L 28–41	33,207
November 15	2:00 pm	New Mexico State		Bulldog Stadium; Fresno, CA		W 24–17	36,137
November 21	6:30 pm	at San Jose State		Spartan Stadium; San José, CA (rivalry)	ESPN2	W 24–10	24,384
November 28	3:00 pm	at No. 9 Boise State		Bronco Stadium; Boise, ID (rivalry)	ESPN2	L 10–61	32,412
December 20	11:30 am	vs. Colorado State		University Stadium; Albuquerque, NM (New Mexico Bowl)	ESPN	L 35–40	24,735
*Non-conference game; ^{†}Homecoming; Rankings from AP Poll released prior to the game; All times are in Pacific time

== Game summaries ==
=== At Rutgers ===
	1	2	3	4	Total
No. 25 Bulldogs	0	0	10	14	24
Scarlet Knights	0	0	0	7	7

=== No. 10 Wisconsin ===
	1	2	3	4	Total
No. 10 Badgers	7	3	3	0	13
No. 21 Bulldogs	0	0	10	0	10

=== At Toledo ===
	1	2	3	4	OT	2OT	Total
Bulldogs	14	3	17	7	7	7	55
Rockets	7	14	3	17	7	6	54

=== At UCLA ===
	1	2	3	4	Total
No. 24 Bulldogs	7	13	16	0	36
Bruins	7	12	5	7	31

1-6 all time. Last meeting in 2003. (17-9 in San Jose in the Silicon Valley Bowl) A Derrick Coleman fumble in the redzone in the fourth quarter took away the Bruins' hope of keeping the Bulldogs from winning a game in the Rose Bowl stadium. Fresno State won its first game there by five points, taking control of the final 8 minutes and 55 seconds and not allowing a UCLA comeback.

=== Hawaii ===
	1	2	3	4	OT	Total
Warriors	9	10	10	0	3	32
No. 22 Bulldogs	3	6	13	7	0	29

=== Idaho ===
	1	2	3	4	Total
Vandals	3	7	7	15	32
Bulldogs	7	14	14	10	45

=== At Utah State ===
	1	2	3	4	Total
Bulldogs	7	7	7	9	30
Aggies	7	6	0	15	28

=== At Louisiana Tech ===
	1	2	3	4	Total
Fresno State Bulldogs	7	14	7	7	35
Louisiana Tech Bulldogs	7	7	10	14	38

=== Nevada ===
	1	2	3	4	Total
Wolf Pack	7	10	14	10	41
Bulldogs	7	0	14	7	28

=== New Mexico State ===
	1	2	3	4	Total
Aggies	10	7	0	0	17
Bulldogs	3	14	0	7	24

=== At San Jose State ===
	1	2	3	4	Total
Bulldogs	3	0	7	14	24
Spartans	7	3	0	0	10

=== At No. 9 Boise State ===
	1	2	3	4	Total
Bulldogs	7	3	0	0	10
No. 9 Broncos	7	6	28	20	61

=== vs. Colorado State (New Mexico Bowl) ===
	1	2	3	4	Total
Rams	10	10	0	20	40
Bulldogs	14	7	7	7	35

== Awards ==
=== First Team All WAC ===
Bobby Lepori- Sr. OL

=== Second Team All WAC ===
Bear Pascoe- Sr. TE- 2007 1st team

Chris Carter- So. LB

Ben Jacobs-So. LB

Moses Harris- Jr. DB
