= David Richmond (American football) =

American football player (born 1987)

Profile
- Position: Wide receiver

Personal information
- Born: April 1, 1987 (age 39); San Diego, California, U.S.
- Listed height: 6 ft 4 in (1.93 m)
- Listed weight: 192 lb (87 kg)

Career information
- College: San Jose State
- NFL draft: 2009: undrafted

Career history
- Cincinnati Bengals (2009)*
- * Offseason or practice squad member only

Awards and highlights
- Second-team All-WAC (2008)

Anthony David Richmond (born April 1, 1987) is an American former football wide receiver. He was signed by the Cincinnati Bengals as an undrafted free agent in 2009. He played college football at San Jose State.

== Early life ==
Richmond attended Garden Grove High school in Garden Grove, California, where he was a standout basketball player. During his senior year, he averaged 20.9 ppg and earned MVP honors in the 2005 Orange County All-star game.

== College career ==
=== Junior college ===
After enrolling at Santa Ana College, Richmond took up football. He caught one pass in the only game he played in 2005. As a sophomore, Richmond developed into one of the top junior college receivers in America. He had 54 receptions for 842 yards and nine touchdowns. Rivals.com ranked him as the No. 53 junior college recruit in the class of 2007. He chose San Jose State over Idaho, BYU, Iowa State, Oregon and Wyoming.

=== San Jose State ===
In his first year at San Jose State, Richmond caught 55 passes for 852 yards and three touchdowns. He had three 100-yard games, including a 180-yard performance against Utah State in which he caught 10 passes and two touchdowns. As a senior, Richmond had 72 receptions for 832 yards and seven touchdowns to earn second-team All-WAC honors.

He was the only San Jose State receiver with more than 25 receptions on the season, and his seven receiving touchdowns accounted for 58 percent of the Spartans production. After the 2008 season, Richmond was selected to play in the 2009 Texas vs The Nation All-Star Classic, where he had three receptions for 37 yards for the Texas team.

== Professional career ==
Richmond was invited to the 2009 NFL Combine. After going undrafted in the 2009 NFL draft, Richmond signed with the Cincinnati Bengals. He, along with fellow rookie Marlon Lucky, was waived on August 22. .
