= Molly Sullivan French =

American team reporter

Molly French
- Born: Molly Sullivan French; 27 August 1979 (age 46)
- Education: University of North Carolina
- Sports commentary career
- Team: Philadelphia Eagles
- Genre: Team reporter
- Sports: NFL football; NBA basketball; college basketball; college football
- Employer: CSN

Molly Sullivan French (born August 27, 1979) is an American team reporter who currently works for the Philadelphia Eagles. She previously worked for NBC Sports Philadelphia, where she was the courtside reporter for the Philadelphia 76ers for six years.

== Early life and education ==
French is a Las Vegas native and graduate of the University of North Carolina at Chapel Hill. A former nationally ranked distance swimmer who competed at the 2000 U.S. Olympic Team Trials, she is also an ACC Champion and four-time NCAA qualifier in the 1650 freestyle for the Tar Heels, who ended her collegiate career as the fastest miler in school history.

== Career ==
French's first on-air job after graduating from UNC was as a Las Vegas-based entertainment reporter and producer for news affiliates such as KTLA in Los Angeles, KENS in San Antonio, KFVE in Honolulu and locally on KVWB. A year later, she landed her own half-hour lifestyle television show on Las Vegas' ABC affiliate, KTNV. where she served as both the program's host and associate producer.

French worked as a field reporter and producer for a number of networks and publications, including E! News and The Daily 10 on E! Entertainment Television as well as Life & Style Weekly magazine. It was during this time that French was approached by publishers to co-author the first insider's book about Las Vegas written specifically for women, Las Vegas Little Red Book: A Girl's Guide to the Perfect Vegas Getaway, with a nationwide release date of February 14, 2007.

French returned to her athletic roots in 2007, joining Comcast SportsNet Philadelphia as a sideline reporter for the Philadelphia 76ers in April 2012. She did sideline reports for TNT during the Indiana Pacers-Atlanta Hawks NBA playoff series in 2014. In addition to her NBA duties, French is also a host/reporter for Top Rank Boxing and occasionally does sideline reports for CBS College Football and basketball.

She has appeared four times for NBA on TNT to fill in for Craig Sager, and twice on NBA on ESPN during the 2014 NBA season.

She was named one of the top five "Sexiest Sportscasters in America" by Playboy.

French was let go by NBC Sports Philadelphia prior to the 2018-19 season.

In July 2018, she was signed on by the Philadelphia Eagles as a host for their training camp coverage and was later extended, staying with the team as a reporter for the rest of the 2018 NFL season.
