= Nathan Enderle =

American gridiron football player (born 1988)

No. 15
- Position: Quarterback

Personal information
- Born: January 12, 1988 (age 38); North Platte, Nebraska, U.S.
- Listed height: 6 ft 4 in (1.93 m)
- Listed weight: 240 lb (109 kg)

Career information
- High school: North Platte (NE)
- College: Idaho
- NFL draft: 2011: 5th round, 160th overall pick

Career history
- Chicago Bears (2011); Jacksonville Jaguars (2012)*; Tennessee Titans (2013)*; San Diego Chargers (2013)*; Montreal Alouettes (2013)*; Portland Thunder (2014)
- * Offseason or practice squad member only

Career AFL statistics
- Comp. / Att.: 16 / 34
- Passing yards: 195
- TD–INT: 3–2
- Passer rating: 62.75
- Stats at ArenaFan.com
- Stats at Pro Football Reference

Nathan William Enderle (born January 12, 1988) is an American former professional football quarterback. He played college football at Idaho, where he was a four-year starter. Enderle was selected in the fifth round of the 2011 NFL draft by the Chicago Bears. He was a member of the Jacksonville Jaguars, Tennessee Titans, San Diego Chargers, Montreal Alouettes and Portland Thunder.

== Early life ==
Born and raised in North Platte, Nebraska, Enderle graduated from North Platte High School in 2006. As a junior in 2004 he tied the Nebraska high school records for completions in a season with 166 and completions in a game with 24. As a senior, he completed 129 of 258 passes for 1,481 yards and 13 touchdowns.

== College career ==
After being redshirted as a freshman in 2006 under head coach Dennis Erickson, Enderle started nine of 12 games for the Vandals under new coach Robb Akey in 2007, missing three games due to a ruptured tendon in throwing hand. He finished the season completing 132 of 298 passes for 1,787 yards, 10 touchdowns and 18 interceptions. As a sophomore in 2008 he started all 12 games, completing 184 of 339 passes for 2,077 yards, 20 touchdowns and 17 interceptions. As a junior in 2009 he played in 11 of 13 games, missing two with a shoulder injury. He finished the season completing 192 of 312 passes for 2,906 yards, 22 touchdowns and nine interceptions. During the 2009 Humanitarian Bowl he helped lead the Vandals to a 43–42 comeback win over Bowling Green. During the game, he completed 15 of 28 passes for 240 yards and four touchdowns with no interceptions. With the game tied at 35 with less than a minute to go, overtime was probable until the Vandal defense gave up a late, 51-yard touchdown pass. With the Vandals trailing by seven points with 32 seconds remaining on their own 34-yard line, Enderle quickly drove his team down the field and completed a 16-yard touchdown pass with four seconds left to pull within a point, then completed another for the two-point conversion to win. In 2010, the Vandals went 6–7 with an inexperienced offensive line, and lost two road games in the final seconds. Enderle ended his career at Idaho with over 10,000 yards in passing, and graduated in December 2010 with a degree in art.

=== College statistics ===
Year	Team	Attempts	Completions	Completion %	Yards	TDs	INT
2006	Idaho	Redshirt					
2007	Idaho	298	132	44.3%	1,787	10	18
2008	Idaho	339	184	54.3%	2,077	20	17
2009	Idaho	312	192	61.5%	2,906	22	9
2010	Idaho	478	271	56.7%	3,314	22	16
Totals		1,427	779	54.6%	10,084	74	60

== Professional career ==
Pre-draft measurables
Height	Weight	Arm length	Hand span	Wingspan	40-yard dash	10-yard split	20-yard split	20-yard shuttle	Three-cone drill	Vertical jump	Broad jump
6 ft 4 1/8 in (1.93 m)	240 lb (109 kg)	31 1/4 in (0.79 m)	9 7/8 in (0.25 m)	6 ft 3 3/8 in (1.91 m)	5.13 s	1.73 s	2.91 s	4.41 s	7.08 s	25.5 in (0.65 m)	8 ft 6 in (2.59 m)
All values from NFL Combine/Pro Day

=== Chicago Bears ===
Enderle was selected by the Chicago Bears in the fifth round of the 2011 NFL draft. The 160th overall pick, he was the tenth of the twelve quarterbacks selected.

Following the lockout of 2011, the Bears signed Enderle to a four-year contract on July 27, 2011. After his rookie year as a reserve, he was waived by the Bears on June 14, 2012, as the Bears changed offensive coordinators.

=== Jacksonville Jaguars ===
A week after his release by the Bears, Enderle signed with the Jacksonville Jaguars on June 21; he was released two months later on August 25, 2012.

=== Tennessee Titans ===
On January 17, 2013, Enderle signed with the Tennessee Titans. On July 24, 2013, Enderle was waived by the Titans.

=== San Diego Chargers ===
On July 31, 2013, Enderle was signed by the San Diego Chargers. On August 25, 2013, he was waived by the Chargers.

=== Montreal Alouettes ===
On September 21, 2013, Enderle was signed to the practice roster of the Montreal Alouettes of the Canadian Football League. He was released on October 3, 2013.

=== Portland Thunder ===
On December 9, 2013, Enderle was assigned to the Portland Thunder of the Arena Football League.

== See also ==
- List of Division I FBS passing yardage leaders
