= 2008 Idaho Vandals football team =

American college football season

2008 Idaho Vandals football
- Conference: Western Athletic Conference
- Record: 2–10 (1–7 WAC)
- Head coach: Robb Akey (2nd season)
- Offensive coordinator: Steve Axman (2nd season)
- Offensive scheme: Spread
- Defensive coordinator: Mark Criner (2nd season)
- Base defense: 4–3
- Home stadium: Kibbie Dome

2008 Western Athletic Conference football standings
	Conf.			Overall
Team	W		L	W		L
No. 11 Boise State $	8	–	0	12	–	1
Louisiana Tech	5	–	3	8	–	5
Nevada	5	–	3	7	–	6
Hawaii	5	–	3	7	–	7
Fresno State	4	–	4	7	–	6
San Jose State	4	–	4	6	–	6
Utah State	3	–	5	3	–	9
New Mexico State	1	–	7	3	–	9
Idaho	1	–	7	2	–	10
$ – Conference champion; Rankings from AP Poll

The 2008 Idaho Vandals football team represented the University of Idaho during the 2008 NCAA Division I FBS football season. Idaho competed as a member of the Western Athletic Conference (WAC), and played their home games in the Kibbie Dome, an indoor facility on campus in Moscow, Idaho. The Vandals were led by second-year head coach Robb Akey.

The Vandals finished the season with a 2–10 overall record and 1–7 in conference play, which was the team's ninth-straight season with a losing record. Idaho's two wins were against in-state rival Idaho State, an FCS program in the Big Sky, and conference foe New Mexico State. The victory over New Mexico State ended a 24-game losing streak against FBS opponents.

Eight of the Vandals' ten losses came by 23 points or more, and against Utah State, Idaho surrendered a third-quarter lead by yielding 28 unanswered points in the final period. Idaho was outgained by conference opponents by 151.6 yards per game on average.

== Schedule ==
Date	Time	Opponent	Site	TV	Result	Attendance	Source
August 30	7:00 pm	at Arizona*	Arizona Stadium; Tucson, AZ		L 0–70	47,511	
September 6	2:00 pm	Idaho State*	Kibbie Dome; Moscow, ID (rivalry)	ALT	W 42–27	15,013	
September 13	2:00 pm	Western Michigan*	Kibbie Dome; Moscow, ID		L 28–51	15,003	
September 20	2:00 pm	at Utah State	Romney Stadium; Logan, UT		L 17–42	10,154	
September 27	8:00 pm	at San Diego State*	Qualcomm Stadium; San Diego, CA		L 17–45	21,401	
October 4	2:00 pm	Nevada	Kibbie Dome; Moscow, ID		L 14–49	15,013	
October 11	7:00 pm	at Fresno State	Bulldog Stadium; Fresno, CA		L 32–45	37,015	
October 18	4:00 pm	at Louisiana Tech	Joe Aillet Stadium; Ruston, LA		L 14–46	12,400	
October 25	2:00 pm	New Mexico State^{†}	Kibbie Dome; Moscow, ID		W 20–14	15,010	
November 1	2:00 pm	San Jose State	Kibbie Dome; Moscow, ID		L 24–30	15,002	
November 15	2:00 pm	No. 9 Boise State	Kibbie Dome; Moscow, ID (rivalry)	KTVB	L 10–45	17,000	
November 22	9:00 pm	at Hawaii	Aloha Stadium; Halawa, HI		L 17-49	39,014	
*Non-conference game; ^{†}Homecoming; Rankings from AP Poll released prior to the game; All times are in Pacific time

Idaho's reported home attendance in 2008 was 92,041 for six games, an average of 15,340 per game. The maximum was 17,000 for the Boise State game on November 15, and the minimum was 15,002 for San Jose State on November 1.

== NFL draft ==
One Vandal was selected in the 2009 NFL draft:

Player	Position	Round	Overall	Franchise
Eddie Williams	FB	7th	221	Washington Redskins
