= UNLV Rebels football statistical leaders =

The UNLV Rebels football statistical leaders are individual statistical leaders of the UNLV Rebels football program in various categories, including passing, rushing, receiving, total offense, defensive stats, and kicking. Within those areas, the lists identify single-game, single-season, and career leaders. The Rebels represent the University of Nevada, Las Vegas in the NCAA Division I FBS Mountain West Conference (MW).

UNLV began competing in intercollegiate football in 1968. This is recent enough that, unlike most college football teams, there is no "pre-modern" era without complete statistics. However, these lists are still dominated by more recent players for several reasons:

- Since 1968, seasons have increased from 10 games to 11 and then 12 games in length.
- Bowl games only began counting toward single-season and career statistics in 2002. The Rebels have played in three bowl games since this decision—in the 2013, 2023, and 2024 seasons, and are assured of a fourth bowl game in 2025.
- From 2013 to 2023, UNLV was grouped in the same MW football division as Hawaii, meaning that it played at Hawaii every other year during that time. This is relevant because the NCAA allows teams that play at Hawaii in a given season to schedule 13 regular-season games instead of the normal 12. Before divisional play began, UNLV scheduled 13 regular-season games in two seasons that it visited Hawaii—in 2010, before Hawaii joined MW football, and 2012, when Hawaii had joined but the league had yet to split into divisions. Since divisional play began, UNLV has played 13 regular-season games once, in 2014 (it was eligible to do so in 2016, but chose not to).
- The MW has played a championship game since 2013. The Rebels played in that game in 2023, 2024, and 2025, giving players in those seasons yet another game to accumulate statistics.
- Since 2018, players have been allowed to participate in as many as four games in a redshirt season; previously, playing in even one game "burned" the redshirt. Since 2024, postseason games (including conference championship games) have not counted against the four-game limit. These changes to redshirt rules have given very recent players several extra games to accumulate statistics.
- Due to COVID-19 disruptions, the NCAA did not count the 2020 season against the eligibility of any football player, giving all players active in that season five years of eligibility instead of the normal four.

These lists are updated through the 2025 MW Championship Game. Players active for UNLV in 2025 are in bold.

== Passing ==
=== Passing yards ===
Career
Rk	Player	Yards	Years
1	Randall Cunningham	8,020	1982 1983 1984
2	Omar Clayton	6,560	2007 2008 2009 2010
3	Jon Denton	6,177	1996 1997
4	Sam King	5,393	1979 1980 1981
5	Glenn Carano	5,095	1973 1974 1975 1976
6	Jason Thomas	4,997	2000 2001 2002
7	Derek Stott	4,725	1988 1989 1990 1991
8	Blake Decker	4,599	2014 2015
9	Caleb Herring	4,325	2010 2011 2012 2013
10	Steve Stallworth	3,789	1983 1984 1985 1986

Single season
Rk	Player	Yards	Year
1	Sam King	3,778	1981
2	Jon Denton	3,591	1996
3	**Anthony Colandrea**	3,459	2025
4	Jayden Maiava	3,085	2023
5	Blake Decker	2,886	2014
6	Randall Cunningham	2,847	1982
7	Caleb Herring	2,718	2013
8	Randall Cunningham	2,628	1984
9	Jon Denton	2,586	1997
10	Randall Cunningham	2,545	1983

Single game
Rk	Player	Yards	Year	Opponent
1	Jon Denton	503	1996	San Diego State
2	Jon Denton	486	1996	Wyoming
3	Sam King	476	1981	UTEP
4	Sam King	473	1981	BYU
5	Greg Van Ness	473	1977	Idaho
6	Sam King	439	1981	Hawaii
7	Jon Denton	432	1996	San Jose State
8	Bob Stockham	425	1993	Utah State
9	Bob Stockham	418	1993	New Mexico State
10	Randall Cunningham	413	1982	Pacific
	Randall Cunningham	413	1982	Cal State Fullerton

=== Passing touchdowns ===
Career
Rk	Player	TDs	Years
1	Randall Cunningham	59	1982 1983 1984
2	Omar Clayton	48	2007 2008 2009 2010
3	Jon Denton	43	1996 1997
4	Caleb Herring	38	2010 2011 2012 2013
5	Glenn Carano	37	1973 1974 1975 1976
6	Larry Gentry	36	1977 1978 1979 1980

Single season
Rk	Player	TDs	Year
1	Jon Denton	25	1996
2	Randall Cunningham	24	1984
	Caleb Herring	24	2013
4	**Anthony Colandrea**	23	2025
5	Larry Gentry	22	1980

Single game
Rk	Player	TDs	Year	Opponent
1	Larry Gentry	5	1980	UTEP
	Jon Denton	5	1997	San Jose State
	Shane Steichen	5	2006	New Mexico
	Caleb Herring	5	2013	San Diego State

== Rushing ==
=== Rushing yards ===
Career
Rk	Player	Yards	Years
1	Charles Williams	4,201	2016 2017 2018 2019 2020 2021
2	Tim Cornett	3,733	2010 2011 2012 2013
3	Mike Thomas	3,149	1973 1974
4	Dominique Dorsey	2,834	2001 2002 2003 2004
5	Kirk Jones	2,656	1983 1984 1985 1986
6	Michael Morton	2,536	1978 1979 1980 1981
7	**Jai'Den Thomas**	2,457	2023 2024 2025
8	Joe Haro	2,013	1998 1999 2001 2002
9	Omar Love	1,932	1992 1993 1994 1996
10	Ickey Woods	1,925	1984 1985 1986 1987

Single season
Rk	Player	Yards	Year
1	Mike Thomas	1,741	1973
2	Ickey Woods	1,658	1987
3	Mike Thomas	1,408	1974
4	Tim Cornett	1,284	2013
5	Dominique Dorsey	1,261	2004
	Charles Williams	1,261	2021
7	Charles Williams	1,257	2019
8	Tim Cornett	1,232	2012
9	Joe Haro	1,107	2001
10	**Jai'Den Thomas**	1,036	2025

Single game
Rk	Player	Yards	Year	Opponent
1	Mike Thomas	314	1973	Santa Clara
2	Mike Thomas	266	1974	Boise State
	Charles Williams	266	2021	Hawai'i
4	Ickey Woods	265	1987	Pacific
5	Mike Thomas	245	1974	Prairie View A&M
6	Raymond Strong	239	1977	Weber State
7	Mike Thomas	236	1973	Wisconsin-Milwaukee
8	Aidan Robbins	227	2022	North Texas
9	Joe Haro	226	2001	Wyoming
10	Larry Croom	222	2002	Colorado State

=== Rushing touchdowns ===
Career
Rk	Player	TDs	Years
1	Mike Thomas	37	1973 1974
2	Tim Cornett	35	2010 2011 2012 2013
3	Charles Williams	34	2016 2017 2018 2019 2020 2021
4	**Jai'Den Thomas**	31	2023 2024 2025
5	Mack Gilchrist	25	1968 1969 1970 1971
6	Jason Thomas	24	2000 2001 2002
7	Glenn Carano	20	1973 1974 1975 1976
	Michael Morton	20	1978 1979 1980 1981
9	Darall Moore	18	1975 1976 1977
10	Kirk Jones	16	1983 1984 1985 1986

Single season
Rk	Player	TDs	Year
1	Mike Thomas	20	1973
2	Mike Thomas	17	1974
3	Tim Cornett	15	2013
	Charles Williams	15	2021
5	**Jai'Den Thomas**	12	2023
	**Jai'Den Thomas**	12	2025
7	Mack Gilchrist	11	1969
	Jason Thomas	11	2000
	Charles Williams	11	2019

Single game
Rk	Player	TDs	Year	Opponent
1	Mike Thomas	4	1973	Wisconsin-Milwaukee
	Mike Thomas	4	1974	Prairie View A&M
	Henry Melton	4	1974	New Mexico Highlands
	Tim Cornett	4	2013	Air Force
	**Jai'Den Thomas**	4	2023	UTEP
	**Jai'Den Thomas**	4	2025	Nevada

== Receiving ==
=== Receptions ===
Career
Rk	Player	Rec	Years
1	Ryan Wolfe	283	2006 2007 2008 2009
2	Ricky White	218	2022 2023 2024
3	Casey Flair	202	2005 2006 2007 2008
4	Damon Williams	187	1995 1996 1997 1998
5	Devante Davis	186	2011 2012 2013 2014
6	Earvin Johnson	183	2001 2002 2003 2004
7	Phillip Payne	171	2008 2009 2010 2011
8	Devonte Boyd	164	2014 2015 2016
9	Len Ware	161	1996 1997 1998 1999
10	Carlos Baker	158	1995 1996 1997 1998

Single season
Rk	Player	Rec	Year
1	Randy Gatewood	88	1994
	Ryan Wolfe	88	2008
	Ricky White	88	2023
4	Devante Davis	87	2013
5	Michael Morton	79	1980
	Ricky White	79	2024
7	Ryan Wolfe	74	2009
8	Carlos Baker	71	1996
9	Jim Sandusky	68	1981
	Keenan McCardell	68	1990

Single game
Rk	Player	Rec	Year	Opponent
1	Randy Gatewood	23	1994	Idaho
2	Phillip Payne	13	2011	Southern Utah
3	Jeff Spek	12	1981	Fresno State
	Earvin Johnson	12	2002	Colorado State
	Steve Jenkins	12	2021	Nevada
	Ricky White	12	2023	Vanderbilt
7	Demond Thompkins	11	1992	Hawaii
	Todd Floyd	11	1997	Nevada
	Damon Williams	11	1997	USC
	Nate Turner	11	2000	San Diego State
	Ryan Wolfe	11	2007	Colorado State
	Ryan Wolfe	11	2008	San Diego State
	Ryan Wolfe	11	2009	New Mexico
	Marcus Sullivan	11	2013	Hawaii
	Devonte Boyd	11	2014	New Mexico
	**Jai'Den Thomas**	11	2025	New Mexico

=== Receiving yards ===
Career
Rk	Player	Yards	Years
1	Ryan Wolfe	3,495	2006 2007 2008 2009
2	Ricky White	3,143	2022 2023 2024
3	Devante Davis	2,785	2011 2012 2013 2014
4	Devonte Boyd	2,630	2014 2015 2016
5	Earvin Johnson	2,604	2001 2002 2003 2004
6	Damon Williams	2,558	1995 1996 1997 1998
7	Henry Bailey	2,515	1991 1992 1993 1994
8	Demond Thompkins	2,396	1991 1992 1993
9	Casey Flair	2,380	2005 2006 2007 2008
10	Phillip Payne	2,295	2008 2009 2010 2011

Single season
Rk	Player	Yards	Year
1	Ricky White	1,483	2023
2	Jim Sandusky	1,346	1981
3	Devante Davis	1,290	2013
4	Randy Gatewood	1,203	1994
5	Demond Thompkins	1,068	1993
6	Darrall Hambrick	1,060	1982

Single game
Rk	Player	Yards	Year	Opponent
1	Randy Gatewood	363	1994	Idaho
2	Demond Thompkins	212	1992	Cal State Fullerton
3	Jeff Spek	206	1981	UTEP
4	Demond Thompkins	201	1992	Hawaii
5	Len Ware	200	1996	San Diego State
6	George Thomas	197	1986	Cal State Fullerton

=== Receiving touchdowns ===
Career
Rk	Player	TDs	Years
1	Phillip Payne	26	2008 2009 2010 2011
2	Henry Bailey	24	1991 1992 1993 1994
3	Ricky White	23	2022 2023 2024
4	Devante Davis	22	2011 2012 2013 2014
5	Sam Greene	21	1979 1980
6	Nate Hawkins	20	1968 1969 1970 1971
7	George Thomas	18	1984 1985 1986 1987
8	Demond Thompkins	17	1991 1992 1993

Single season
Rk	Player	TDs	Year
1	Devante Davis	14	2013
2	Sam Greene	11	1980
	Ricky White	11	2024
4	Henry Bailey	10	1994
	Nate Turner	10	2000
6	Sam Greene	9	1979
	Reggie Farmer	9	1983
	Tony Gladney	9	1984
9	Len Ware	8	1996
	Earvin Johnson	8	2004
	Ricky White	8	2023

Single game
Rk	Player	TDs	Year	Opponent
1	Nate Hawkins	4	1971	New Mexico Highlands
	Henry Bailey	4	1994	Idaho
	Devante Davis	4	2013	San Diego State

== Total offense ==
Total offense is the sum of passing and rushing statistics. It does not include receiving or returns.

=== Total offense yards ===
Career
Rk	Player	Yards	Years
1	Randall Cunningham	8,224	1982 1983 1984
2	Omar Clayton	7,334	2007 2008 2009 2010
3	Jason Thomas	6,525	2000 2001 2002
4	Jon Denton	6,220	1996 1997
5	Glenn Carano	5,234	1973 1974 1975 1976

Single season
Rk	Player	Yards	Year
1	**Anthony Colandrea**	4,108	2025
2	Jon Denton	3,629	1996
3	Sam King	3,562	1981
4	Jayden Maiava	3,362	2023
5	Blake Decker	3,252	2014
6	Caleb Herring	3,064	2013
7	Randall Cunningham	2,908	1982

Single game
Rk	Player	Yards	Year	Opponent
1	Jon Denton	513	1996	San Diego State
2	Jon Denton	491	1996	Wyoming
3	Sam King	468	1981	BYU
4	Randall Cunningham	466	1982	Cal State Fullerton
5	Sam King	457	1981	UTEP

=== Touchdowns responsible for ===
The NCAA officially designates combined passing and rushing touchdowns as "touchdowns responsible for".

Unlike most NCAA programs, UNLV does not list single-season or single-game leaders in this statistic in its record book.

Career
Rk	Player	TDs	Years
1	Randall Cunningham	68	1982 1983 1984
2	Glenn Carano	57	1973 1974 1975 1976
3	Omar Clayton	55	2007 2008 2009 2010
4	Jon Denton	49	1996 1997
5	Caleb Herring	45	2010 2011 2012 2013

== Defense ==
=== Interceptions ===
Career
Rk	Player	Ints	Years
1	Marlon Beavers	17	1973 1974 1975 1976
2	Charles Jarvis	14	1978 1979 1980 1981
	Kevin Thomas	14	1998 1999 2000 2001
4	Cameron Oliver	13	2021 2022 2023 2024
5	Patt Medchill	11	1970 1971 1972
	David Hollis	11	1983 1984 1985 1986

Single season
Rk	Player	Ints	Year
1	Kevin Thomas	7	2001
2	Marlon Beavers	6	1976
	Aaron Mitchell	6	1978
	Alvin Horn	6	1986
	Jamaal Brimmer	6	2003

Single game
Rk	Player	Ints	Year	Opponent
1	Ed Saignes	3	1984	Idaho State

=== Tackles ===
Career
Rk	Player	Tackles	Years
1	Adam Seward	433	2001 2002 2003 2004
2	Jason Beauchamp	334	2006 2007 2008 2009
3	Peni Vea	328	2012 2013 2014 2015
4	Beau Bell	320	2004 2005 2006 2007
5	Tau Lotelelei	277	2013 2014 2015 2016
6	Randy Black	294	1997 1998 1999 2000
7	Ryan Claridge	293	2000 2001 2002 2003 2004
8	Darnell Pickens	289	1984 1985 1986 1987
9	Jamaal Brimmer	280	2001 2002 2003 2004
10	Doc Wise	280	1986 1987 1988 1989

Single season
Rk	Player	Tackles	Year
1	Scott Patton	147	1997
2	Jason Medlock	137	1993
3	Jackson Woodard	135	2024
4	Adam Seward	133	2002
5	Kirk Dodge	132	1983
6	Tom Polley	131	1984
7	Jason Beauchamp	127	2008
8	Beau Bell	126	2007
9	Austin Ajiake	124	2022
10	Mike Walker	122	1980

Single game
Rk	Player	Tackles	Year	Opponent
1	Quincy Sanders	22	1999	Air Force

=== Sacks ===
Career
Rk	Player	Sacks	Years
1	Daryl Knox	28.0	1984 1985
2	Todd Liebenstein	22.0	1978 1979 1980 1981
3	Mark Byers	20.5	1993 1994
4	Phil O'Neill	20.0	1978 1979 1980
5	Ryan Claridge	18.5	2000 2001 2002 2003 2004
6	Talance Sawyer	15.5	1995 1996 1997 1998
7	Leon Moore	15.0	2002 2003 2004 2005

Single season
Rk	Player	Sacks	Year
1	Mark Byers	20.5	1994
2	Daryl Knox	20.0	1984
3	Ken Mitchell	11.0	1971
4	Craig Silverman	10.0	1979
	Todd Liebenstein	10.0	1980
6	Ryan Claridge	9.0	2004
7	Anton Palepoi	8.0	2000
8	Suge Knight	7.5	1986
	Fisher Camac	7.5	2024

Single game
Rk	Player	Sacks	Year	Opponent
1	Daryl Knox	7.0	1985	New Mexico State
2	Mark Byers	5.0	1994	Utah State
3	Anton Palepoi	4.0	2000	Wyoming

== Kicking ==
=== Field goals made ===
Career
Rk	Player	FGs	Years
1	Daniel Gutierrez	55	2017 2018 2019 2020 2021 2022
2	Nick Garritano	53	1991 1992 1993 1994
3	Sergio Aguayo	48	2004 2005 2006 2007
4	Dillon Pieffer	40	2000 2001 2002 2003
5	Nolan Kohorst	39	2010 2011 2012 2013
6	Jim Cook	38	1986 1987 1988

Single season
Rk	Player	FGs	Year
1	Jose Pizano	26	2023
	Caden Chittenden	26	2024
3	Nick Garritano	21	1994
4	Dillon Pieffer	20	2003
5	Daniel Gutierrez	18	2022
6	Sergio Aguayo	17	2007
7	Joey DiGiovanna	16	1984
	Daniel Gutierrez	16	2021
9	Jim Cook	15	1987
	**Ramon Villela**	15	2025

Single game
Rk	Player	FGs	Year	Opponent
1	Jose Pizano	6	2023	Colorado State
2	Daniel Gutierrez	5	2022	Fresno State
3	Jim Gaetano	4	1978	Wyoming
	Joey DiGiovanna	4	1984	Fresno State
	Nick Garritano	4	1992	Cal State Fullerton
	Nick Garritano	4	1993	Central Michigan
	Dillon Pieffer	4	2003	Hawaii
	Nolan Kohorst	4	2013	Hawaii
	Daniel Gutierrez	4	2021	Eastern Washington
	Daniel Gutierrez	4 >	2022	Hawai'i
	Jose Pizano	4	2023	Vanderbilt
	Caden Chittenden	4	2024	Oregon State

=== Field goal percentage ===
Career
Rk	Player	FG%	Years
1	Evan Pantels	92.9%	2016
2	Jose Pizano	89.7%	2023
3	Daniel Gutierrez	85.9%	2017 2018 2019 2020 2021 2022
4	Caden Chittenden	78.8%	2024
5	**Ramon Villela**	75.0%	2025
6	Nick Garritano	72.6%	1991 1992 1993 1994
7	Kyle Watson	72.7%	2008 2009
8	Jim Cook	71.7%	1986 1987 1988
9	Nicolai Bornand	70.8%	2014 2015 2016
10	Dillon Pieffer	70.2%	2000 2001 2002 2003

Single season
Rk	Player	FG%	Year
1	Daniel Gutierrez	94.7%	2022
2	Evan Pantels	92.9%	2016
3	Jose Pizano	89.7%	2023
4	Daniel Gutierrez	88.9%	2021
5	Jim Cook	88.2%	1987
6	Nolan Kohorst	85.7%	2012
7	Jim Cook	84.6%	1986
8	Nick Garritano	80.8%	1994
9	Dillon Pieffer	80.0%	2003
