= Joe Glenn (American football) =

American football player and coach (born 1949)

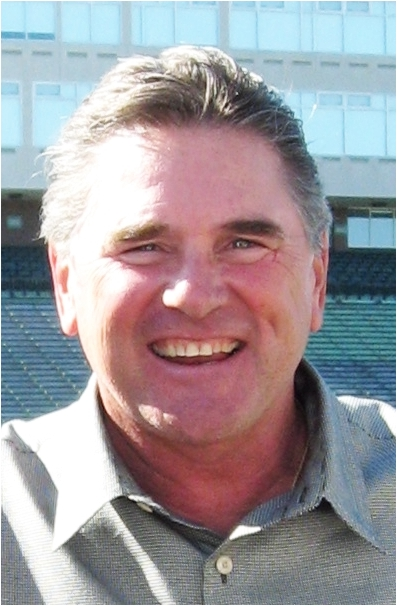
- Glenn in 2007

Biographical details
- Born: March 7, 1949 (age 77); Lincoln, Nebraska, U.S.

Playing career
- 1968–1971: South Dakota
- Positions: Quarterback, wide receiver

Coaching career (HC unless noted)
- 1974: South Dakota (backfield)
- 1975: Northern Arizona (backfield)
- 1976–1979: Doane
- 1980–1985: Montana (OC/QB/WR)
- 1986–1988: Northern Colorado (QB/K)
- 1989–1999: Northern Colorado
- 2000–2002: Montana
- 2003–2008: Wyoming
- 2012–2015: South Dakota

Head coaching record
- Overall: 200–134–1
- Bowls: 1–0
- Tournaments: 10–5 (NCAA D-II playoffs); 8–2 (NCAA D-I-AA playoffs)

Accomplishments and honors

Championships
- 2 NCAA Division II (1996–1997); 1 NCAA Division I-AA (2001); 4 NCC (1996–1999); 3 Big Sky (2000–2002)

Awards
- Eddie Robinson Award (2000)

Joseph Cassidy Glenn (born March 7, 1949) is an American former college football player and coach. He was the head football coach at the University of South Dakota, his alma mater, from 2012 to 2015. He was named head coach on December 5, 2011, after the school's athletic director, David Sayler, fired Ed Meierkort. Glenn served as the head football coach at Doane College (1976–1979), the University of Northern Colorado (1989–1999), the University of Montana (2000–2002), and the University of Wyoming (2003–2008). He won two NCAA Division II Football Championships at Northern Colorado, in 1996 and 1997, and an NCAA Division I-AA Football Championship at Montana in 2001.

== Coaching career ==
=== Early coaching career ===
Glenn served as backfield coach at the University of South Dakota in 1974. He was also a backfield coach at Northern Arizona University in 1975.

Glenn's first head coaching job was at Doane College in Crete, Nebraska. There he was the youngest head college football coach at 27 years of age. While at Doane he compiled a 21–18–1 record over four seasons. After Doane, Glenn made his first stint at the University of Montana as a quarterbacks and wide receivers coach and offensive coordinator from 1980 to 1985. He was out of coaching in 1986. In 1987, he joined the staff at University of Northern Colorado (UNC) as quarterbacks and kicking coach. He was named head coach of UNC for the 1989 season.

Prior to coaching at Montana, Glenn led the Division II University of Northern Colorado to two NCAA Division II Football Championships in 1996 and 1997. Glenn spent eleven seasons at UNC, with a 98–35 record.

=== Montana ===
Glenn coached at Montana for three seasons, from 2000 to 2002, and compiled a 39–6 record. In 2001, the Grizzlies won the NCAA Division I-AA Football Championship, defeating Furman in the title game. The year before, the Grizzlies finished as the NCAA Division I-AA runner-up, losing to Georgia Southern in the championship game. In 2002, Montana finished in the quarterfinals of the NCAA Division I-AA playoffs.

=== Wyoming ===
Over a three-year period, Glenn and his staff took a team that won only five games in the three previous seasons to a Las Vegas Bowl win in two seasons. The 24–21 victory over UCLA on December 23, 2004, marked the first bowl appearance for Wyoming in 11 years and their first bowl victory in 38 years. In 2005, after starting 4–1, including a victory over Ole Miss, the Cowboys went on a six-game losing skid, finishing 4–7.

The 2006 season was one which saw the Cowboys picked to finish last in the conference. After an opening day victory over Utah State, the Cowboys suffered four losses, two of them in overtime. Then the Cowboys fortunes began to shift. The team enjoyed a four-game winning streak, all against conference opponents. The Cowboys next two games were both road losses, the first against TCU, in which they managed only a field goal. The next game was on the road against No. 25 BYU. The Cougars trounced the Cowboys, 55–7. The Cowboys fell to 5–6. The Cowboys won their final game against UNLV, moving them to a 6–6 record, and making them bowl eligible but the team did not receive an invitation.

The 2007 Cowboys season started off with a 23–3 victory over Atlantic Coast Conference-member Virginia. By the end of October, Wyoming was 5–3 and needed only one win in its last four games to become bowl-eligible. However, the Cowboys lost all four games to finish 5–7, including a 50–0 thrashing at the hands of Utah on November 10.

Offensive coordinator Billy Cockhill was fired at the end of the 2007 season and replaced by Bob Cole, formerly of Florida A&M in an attempt to improve the Cowboy's anemic offense. Junior college signal caller Dax Crum came to the Laramie campus from the Mesa Community College in Arizona to compete for the starting quarterback job, which he won over junior Karsten Sween.

The 2008 Cowboys opened the season with a win over Mid-American Conference-member 2008 Ohio Bobcats football team (21-20), a loss to Air Force (23-3) and a win over FCS North Dakota State (16–13). Wyoming followed up that victory with five straight losses: to BYU (44–0), Bowling Green (45–16), New Mexico (24–0), Utah (40-7), and TCU (54–7). On November 1, the Pokes beat San Diego State, 35–10, at home and then followed with a win over Tennessee, 13–7, on the road a week later. Five days later, on Thursday, Wyoming lost to UNLV, 22–14, on the road. Wyoming finished the season by losing to arch rival Colorado State, 31–20, at home in the 100th Border War. The following day, November 23, 2008, Glenn was fired. Glenn finished his career at Wyoming with an overall record of 30–41 (.423), and 15–31 (.326) versus Mountain West opponents.

Glenn joined the Mtn. as a game-day analyst in 2009. In 2010, he left the Mtn. and joined the WAC Sports Network as a color commentator.

=== South Dakota ===
Glenn was named USD's 29th head football coach on December 5, 2011. Glenn started coaching the Coyotes during the 2012 season as they started their first season as a full-fledged member in Division I-FCS football, competing in the Missouri Valley Football Conference.

== Controversy ==
During the week before their game against Utah in 2007, Glenn "guaranteed" a victory at a luncheon for University of Wyoming students. However, this ended up motivating Utah as they beat Wyoming that day, 50–0. In the third quarter, with the Utes up 43–0, Utah attempted an onside kick. After the play, a furious Glenn was caught giving the middle finger in the direction of the Utah sidelines on national television. The Mountain West Conference reprimanded Glenn, who would later apologize for the obscene gesture and regretted the "guarantee."

== Personal life ==
Glenn graduated from the University of South Dakota in 1971. While there, he earned a Bachelor of Arts degree in health, physical education, recreation and athletics. He played quarterback and wide receiver for the Coyotes, and was selected a team captain as a senior. During college, he completed Army ROTC and upon graduation was commissioned as a second lieutenant serving two years of active duty as an MP at Fort Leavenworth, Kansas. In 1975, he received a master's degree in education from South Dakota. In 2006, Glenn was inducted into the university's Hall of Fame.

Glenn and his wife, Michele, are both natives of Lincoln, Nebraska. They have two adult children: a daughter, Erin, and a son, Casey. Casey was a All-Conf and All-American offensive lineman at Carroll College in Helena, Montana, concluding his playing career in 2002 when Carroll won their first of five NAIA National Championships. After coaching at Idaho State, South Dakota and Oklahoma, he served as tight ends and fullbacks coach after serving as Director of Football Operations for Wyoming under his father.

== Head coaching record ==
Year	Team	Overall	Conference	Standing	Bowl/playoffs
Doane Tigers (Nebraska Intercollegiate Athletic Conference) (1976–1979)
1976	Doane	5–5	2–3	4th	
1977	Doane	5–5	3½–1½	2nd	
1978	Doane	6–4	2½–2½	4th	
1979	Doane	5–4–1	1½–2½–1	4th	
Doane:		21–18–1	9½–9½–1		
Northern Colorado Bears (North Central Conference) (1989–1999)
1989	Northern Colorado	6–4	5–4	T–4th	
1990	Northern Colorado	8–3	6–3	3rd	L NCAA Division II First Round
1991	Northern Colorado	8–3	6–2	2nd	L NCAA Division II First Round
1992	Northern Colorado	6–5	4–5	T–7th	
1993	Northern Colorado	8–3	6–3	T–3rd	
1994	Northern Colorado	7–4	6–3	T–2nd	
1995	Northern Colorado	9–3	7–2	T–2nd	L NCAA Division II First Round
1996	Northern Colorado	12–3	6–3	T–2nd	W NCAA Division II Championship
1997	Northern Colorado	13–2	8–1	1st	W NCAA Division II Championship
1998	Northern Colorado	11–2	8–1	T–1st	L NCAA Division II Quarterfinal
1999	Northern Colorado	11–2	8–1	T–1st	L NCAA Division II Quarterfinal
Northern Colorado:		98–35	70–28		
Montana Grizzlies (Big Sky Conference) (2000–2002)
2000	Montana	13–2	8–0	1st	L NCAA Division I-AA Championship
2001	Montana	15–1	7–0	1st	W NCAA Division I-AA Championship
2002	Montana	11–2	5–2	T–1st	L NCAA Division I-AA Quarterfinal
Montana:		39–6	20–2		
Wyoming Cowboys (Mountain West Conference) (2003–2008)
2003	Wyoming	4–8	2–5	T–7th	
2004	Wyoming	7–5	3–4	T–4th	W Las Vegas
2005	Wyoming	4–7	2–6	8th	
2006	Wyoming	6–6	5–3	T–3rd	
2007	Wyoming	5–7	2–6	T–7th	
2008	Wyoming	4–8	1–7	T–8th	
Wyoming:		30–41	15–31		
South Dakota Coyotes (Missouri Valley Football Conference) (2012–2015)
2012	South Dakota	1–10	0–8	10th	
2013	South Dakota	4–8	3–5	T–7th	
2014	South Dakota	2–10	0–8	10th	
2015	South Dakota	5–6	3–5	T–6th	
South Dakota:		12–34	6–26		
Total:		200–134–1			
National championship Conference title Conference division title or championship game berth

== See also ==
- List of college football career coaching wins leaders
