= 2003 Mountain West Conference football season =

- League: NCAA Division I-A
- Sport: football
- Teams: 8

2004 NFL Draft
- Top draft pick: Jeff Shoate (San Diego State)
- Picked by: Denver Broncos, 152nd overall

Regular season
- Season champions: Utah
- Runners-up: New Mexico
- Top scorer: DonTrell Moore (126 points)

Football seasons
- 2002 2004

2003 Mountain West Conference football standings
	Conf.			Overall
Team	W		L	W		L
No. 21 Utah $	6	–	1	10	–	2
New Mexico	5	–	2	8	–	5
Colorado State	4	–	3	7	–	6
Air Force	3	–	4	7	–	5
San Diego State	3	–	4	6	–	6
BYU	3	–	4	4	–	8
UNLV	2	–	5	6	–	6
Wyoming	2	–	5	4	–	8
$ – Conference champion; Rankings from AP Poll

The 2003 Mountain West Conference football season was the fifth since eight former members of the Western Athletic Conference banded together to form the Mountain West Conference. The Utah Utes won the conference championship in 2003, the Utes' second overall and first outright title since the league began in 1999.

== Coaching changes ==
- Joe Glenn took over at Wyoming, replacing Vic Koenning.
- Urban Meyer took over at Utah.

== Bowl games ==
Bowl	Date	Stadium	City	Result
Las Vegas Bowl	December 24, 2003	Sam Boyd Stadium	Las Vegas	Oregon State 55, New Mexico 14
Liberty Bowl	December 31, 2003	Liberty Bowl Memorial Stadium	Memphis, Tennessee	Utah 17, Southern Miss 0
San Francisco Bowl	December 31, 2003	SBC Park	San Francisco	Boston College 35, Colorado State 21

== Awards ==
- Coach of the Year: Urban Meyer, Utah
- Offensive Player of the Year: QB Bradlee Van Pelt, Sr, Colorado State
- Defensive Player of the Year: LB Kirk Morrison, Sr, San Diego State
- Freshman of the Year: RB Lynell Hamilton, San Diego State

== All-Conference teams ==
First-team:

Offense
Quarterback	Bradlee Van Pelt, Sr, Colorado State
Running back	DonTrell Moore, So, New Mexico; Lynell Hamilton, Fr, San Diego State
Wide receiver	David Anderson, So, Colorado State; Paris Warren, Jr, Utah
Tight end	Ben Moa, Sr, Utah
Offensive Line	Jason Lenzmeier, Sr, New Mexico; Claude Terrell, Jr, New Mexico; Erik Pears, Jr, Colorado State; Ryan Cook, So, New Mexico; Brendan Darby, Sr, San Diego State
Kicker	Wes Zunker, Sr, New Mexico
Kick returner	Dexter Wynn, Sr, Colorado State

Defense
Defensive line	D.J. Rentería, Sr, New Mexico; Brady Poppinga, Jr, BYU; Josh Savage, Sr, Utah; Bryan Save, Sr, Colorado State
Linebacker	Kirk Morrison, Jr, San Diego State; Adam Seward, Jr, UNLV; Marchello Graddy, Sr, Air Force
Defensive back	Jamaal Brimmer, Jr, UNLV; Aaron Francisco, Jr, BYU; Dexter Wynn, Sr, Colorado State; Brandon Ratcliff, Sr, New Mexico
Punter	Matt Payne, Jr, BYU

Second-team:

Offense
Quarterback	Alex Smith, So, Utah
Running back	Reynaldo Brathwaite, Jr, BYU; Brandon Warfield, Sr, Utah
Wide receiver	Dwight Counter, Sr, New Mexico; Earvin Johnson, Jr, UNLV
Tight end	Joel Dreessen, Jr, Colorado State
Offensive Line	Brett Huyser, Sr, Air Force; Brett Waller, Sr, Air Force; Mark Dreyer, Sr, Colorado State; Mike Kracalik, Jr, San Diego State; Dominic Furio, Sr, UNLV
Kicker	Dillon Pieffer, Sr, UNLV
Kick returner	Bo Nagahi, Jr, Utah

Defense
Defensive line	Daniel Kegler, Sr, New Mexico; Zach Rupp, Sr, New Mexico; Brandon Rager, Sr, San Diego State; Brandon Casavan, Sr, Wyoming
Linebacker	Daniel Gawronski, Sr, New Mexico; Billy Strother, Sr, New Mexico; Matt McCoy, So, San Diego State
Defensive back	Gabriel Fulbright, So, New Mexico; Jeff Shoate, Sr, San Diego State; Dave Revill, Sr, Utah; Morgan Scalley, Jr, Utah
Punter	Gary Cook, Jr, UNLV
