= Ryan Wolfe =

Ryan Wolfe may refer to:

- Ryan Wolfe (CSI: Miami)
- Ryan Wolfe (American football)
