= 2012 New Mexico Lobos football team =

American college football season

2012 New Mexico Lobos football
- Conference: Mountain West Conference
- Record: 4–9 (1–7 MW)
- Head coach: Bob Davie (1st season)
- Offensive coordinator: Bob DeBesse (1st season)
- Offensive scheme: Multiple pistol
- Defensive coordinator: Jeff Mills (1st season)
- Base defense: 3–4
- Home stadium: University Stadium

2012 Mountain West Conference football standings
	Conf.			Overall
Team	W		L	W		L
No. 18 Boise State +	7	–	1	11	–	2
Fresno State +	7	–	1	9	–	4
San Diego State +	7	–	1	9	–	4
Air Force	5	–	3	6	–	7
Nevada	4	–	4	7	–	6
Wyoming	3	–	5	4	–	8
Colorado State	3	–	5	4	–	8
UNLV	2	–	6	2	–	11
New Mexico	1	–	7	4	–	9
Hawaii	1	–	7	3	–	9
+ – Conference co-champions; Rankings from AP Poll

The 2012 New Mexico Lobos football team represented the University of New Mexico as a member of the Mountain West Conference (MW) during the 2012 NCAA Division I FBS football season. Led by first-year head coach Bob Davie, the Lobos compiled an overall record of 4–9 with a mark of 1–7 in conference play, tying for ninth place at the bottom of the MW standings. The team played home games at University Stadium in Albuquerque, New Mexico.

== Schedule ==
Date	Time	Opponent	Site	TV	Result	Attendance
September 1	3:00 p.m.	Southern*	University Stadium; Albuquerque, NM		W 66–21	28,450
September 8	6:00 p.m.	at No. 17 Texas*	Darrell K Royal–Texas Memorial Stadium; Austin, TX	LHN	L 0–45	100,990
September 15	6:00 p.m.	at Texas Tech*	Jones AT&T Stadium; Lubbock, TX	FCS Central	L 14–49	58,955
September 22	6:00 p.m.	at New Mexico State*	Aggie Memorial Stadium; Las Cruces, NM (Rio Grande Rivalry)	AV, ESPN3	W 27–14	25,211
September 29	4:00 p.m.	No. 24 Boise State	University Stadium; Albuquerque, NM	Comcast	L 29–32	28,270
October 6	4:00 p.m.	Texas State*^{†}	University Stadium; Albuquerque, NM	PVN	W 35–14	22,135
October 13	10:00 p.m.	at Hawaii	Aloha Stadium; Halawa, HI	ROOT	W 35–23	31,632
October 20	5:00 p.m.	at Air Force	Falcon Stadium; Colorado Springs, CO	ROOT	L 23–28	29,726
October 27	1:30 p.m.	Fresno State	University Stadium; Albuquerque, NM	Comcast, TWCSN	L 32–49	19,856
November 3	2:00 p.m.	at UNLV	Sam Boyd Stadium; Whitney, NV	Comcast, TWCSN	L 7–35	12,835
November 10	1:30 p.m.	Wyoming	University Stadium; Albuquerque, NM	Comcast	L 23–28	17,839
November 17	1:30 p.m.	Nevada	University Stadium; Albuquerque, NM	Comcast	L 24–31	17,290
November 24	5:00 p.m.	at Colorado State	Hughes Stadium; Fort Collins, CO	ROOT	L 20–24	12,286
*Non-conference game; ^{†}Homecoming; Rankings from AP Poll released prior to the game; All times are in Mountain time

== Game summaries ==
=== Southern ===
	1	2	3	4	Total
Jaguars	0	6	7	8	21
Lobos	7	38	14	7	66

=== At Texas ===
	1	2	3	4	Total
Lobos	0	0	0	0	0
#15 Longhorns	7	10	14	14	45

=== At Texas Tech ===
	1	2	3	4	Total
Lobos	0	14	0	0	14
Red Raiders	14	28	7	0	49

=== At New Mexico State ===
	1	2	3	4	Total
Lobos	3	10	7	7	27
Aggies	0	7	0	7	14

=== Boise State ===
	1	2	3	4	Total
#24 Broncos	3	22	0	7	32
Lobos	0	0	14	15	29

=== Texas State ===
	1	2	3	4	Total
Bobcats	7	7	0	0	14
Lobos	14	14	7	0	35

=== At Hawaii ===
	1	2	3	4	Total
Lobos	14	7	7	7	35
Warriors	0	10	7	6	23

=== At Air Force ===
	1	2	3	4	Total
Lobos	10	0	7	6	23
Falcons	7	7	7	7	28

=== Fresno State ===
	1	2	3	4	Total
Bulldogs	0	14	21	14	49
Lobos	14	10	0	8	32

=== At UNLV ===
	1	2	3	4	Total
Lobos	0	0	7	0	7
Rebels	7	14	7	7	35

=== Wyoming ===
	1	2	3	4	Total
Cowboys	0	21	0	7	28
Lobos	0	7	10	6	23

=== Nevada ===
	1	2	3	4	Total
Wolf Pack	7	14	10	0	31
Lobos	14	3	7	0	24

=== At Colorado State ===
	1	2	3	4	Total
Lobos	7	0	3	10	20
Rams	14	3	0	7	24
