= 2008 Wyoming Cowboys football team =

American college football season

2008 Wyoming Cowboys football
- Conference: Mountain West Conference
- Record: 4–8 (1–7 MW)
- Head coach: Joe Glenn (6th season)
- Offensive coordinator: Bob Cole (1st season)
- Offensive scheme: Multiple
- Defensive coordinator: Mike Breske (6th season)
- Base defense: 3–4
- Home stadium: War Memorial Stadium

2008 Mountain West Conference football standings
	Conf.			Overall
Team	W		L	W		L
No. 2 Utah $	8	–	0	13	–	0
No. 7 TCU	7	–	1	11	–	2
No. 25 BYU	6	–	2	10	–	3
Air Force	5	–	3	8	–	5
Colorado State	4	–	4	7	–	6
UNLV	2	–	6	5	–	7
New Mexico	2	–	6	4	–	8
Wyoming	1	–	7	4	–	8
San Diego State	1	–	7	2	–	10
$ – Conference champion and BCS representative as top non-AQ school to meet automatic qualification criteria; Rankings from AP Poll

The 2008 Wyoming Cowboys football team represented the University of Wyoming as a member of the Mountain West Conference (MW) during the 2008 NCAA Division I FBS football season. Led by Joe Glenn in his sixth and final season as head coach, the Cowboys compiled an overall record of 4–8 record with a mark of 1–8 in conference play, tying for eighth place at the bottom of the MW standings. The team played home games at War Memorial Stadium in Laramie, Wyoming.

Glenn was fired on November 23. Dave Christensen, offensive coordinator from Missouri, accepted the job as Wyoming's new head coach on November 30.

== Schedule ==
Date	Time	Opponent	Site	TV	Result	Attendance	Source
August 30	12:00 pm	Ohio*	War Memorial Stadium; Laramie, WY	mtn.	W 21–20	20,430	
September 6	1:30 pm	Air Force	War Memorial Stadium; Laramie, WY	CBSCS	L 3–23	23,168	
September 13	1:00 pm	No. 1 (FCS) North Dakota State*	War Memorial Stadium; Laramie, WY		W 16–13	19,156	
September 20	1:00 pm	at No. 14 BYU	LaVell Edwards Stadium; Provo, UT	The Mtn.	L 0–44	64,059	
September 27	2:00 pm	Bowling Green*	War Memorial Stadium; Laramie, WY	mtn.	L 16–45	17,411	
October 4	7:30 pm	at New Mexico	University Stadium; Albuquerque, NM	mtn.	L 0–24	28,752	
October 11	12:00 pm	No. 14 Utah^{†}	War Memorial Stadium; Laramie, WY	mtn.	L 7–40	17,123	
October 25	4:00 pm	at No. 15 TCU	Amon G. Carter Stadium; Fort Worth, TX	mtn.	L 7–54	30,103	
November 1	12:00 pm	San Diego State	War Memorial Stadium; Laramie, WY	mtn.	W 35–10	11,779	
November 8	11:00 am	at Tennessee*	Neyland Stadium; Knoxville, TN	PPV	W 13–7	99,489	
November 13	7:00 pm	at UNLV	Sam Boyd Stadium; Whitney, NV	CBSCS	L 14–22	18,154	
November 22	12:00 pm	Colorado State	War Memorial Stadium; Laramie, WY (Border War)	mtn.	L 20–31	18,569	
*Non-conference game; ^{†}Homecoming; Rankings from AP Poll released prior to the game; All times are in Mountain time

== Game summaries ==
=== Ohio ===
	1	2	3	4	Total
Ohio	7	10	0	3	20
Wyoming	7	7	0	7	21

In the opening game of the 2008 season, the Cowboys would down the Ohio Bobcats at home 21-20. In the first quarter, Ohio would score first on a 4-yard Theo Scott touchdown pass to Andrew Mooney, only to have to Cowboys answer with a 6-yard Devin Moore touchdown run to knot the game at 7-7 entering the second quarter. In the second, Wyoming would open the scoring with a 3-yard Dax Crum touchdown pass to J. Salyards and take a 14-7 lead. The Bobcats would answer with 10 consecutive points on a 100-yard Donte Harden kickoff return, and a 31-yard Barrett Way field goal in taking a 17-14 halftime lead. After a scoreless third, Ohio would extend its lead to 20-14 after converting a 34-yard Way field goal. The Cowboys would respond with what turned out to be the game-winning touchdown midway through the fourth on a 23-yard Crum touchdown pass to Donate Morgan to win by a final score of 21-20.

=== Air Force ===
	1	2	3	4	Total
Air Force	0	3	10	10	23
Wyoming	0	3	0	0	3

In the Mountain West opener, the Cowboys would surrender 20 unanswered, second half points in this 23-3 loss to the Falcons. After a scoreless first, the Cowboys would respond to an Air Force field goal with a 47-yard Jake Scott field goal late in the second to tie the game at 3-3 going into the half for their only points on the afternoon.

=== North Dakota State ===
	1	2	3	4	Total
North Dakota State	0	10	3	0	13
Wyoming	0	0	10	6	16

After falling behind in the third quarter by a score of 13-0 to the FCS Bison, the Cowboys would rally back with 16 unanswered points in taking a 16-13 victory at home. Midway through the third, the Cowboys would score their first points on a 2-yard Devin Moore touchdown run to close the gap to 13-7. Kicker Jake Scott would then provide the remainder of scoring on a pair of 28-yard field goals, and a third from 29-yards with only :04 seconds remaining in the contest to take the win.

=== BYU ===
	1	2	3	4	Total
Wyoming	0	0	0	0	0
BYU	7	20	14	3	44

With two defensive touchdowns and outgaining the Cowboys 364-273 yards in total offense, the 14th ranked BYU Cougars were dominant in this 44-0 shutout at Provo.

=== Bowling Green ===
	1	2	3	4	Total
Bowling Green	7	17	14	7	45
Wyoming	0	10	0	6	16

=== New Mexico ===
	1	2	3	4	Total
Wyoming	0	0	0	0	0
New Mexico	14	7	0	3	24

=== Utah ===
	1	2	3	4	Total
Utah	10	17	7	6	40
Wyoming	0	0	0	7	7

=== TCU ===
	1	2	3	4	Total
Wyoming	0	7	0	0	7
TCU	7	17	14	16	54

=== San Diego State ===
	1	2	3	4	Total
San Diego State	3	0	7	0	10
Wyoming	7	21	7	0	35

=== Tennessee ===
	1	2	3	4	Total
Wyoming	7	6	0	0	13
Tennessee	0	0	7	0	7

=== UNLV ===
	1	2	3	4	Total
Wyoming	0	7	7	0	14
UNLV	3	6	0	13	22

=== Colorado State ===
	1	2	3	4	Total
Colorado State	0	10	7	14	31
Wyoming	7	7	6	0	20

== Coaching staff ==
Name	Position	Years at WY*	Alma mater (year)
Joe Glenn	Head coach	6	University of South Dakota (1971)
Bryan Applewhite	Running backs/fullbacks	6	University of Northern Colorado (1998)
Mike Breske	Assistant head coach Defensive coordinator/secondary	6	South Dakota State University (1981)
Bob Cole	Offensive coordinator Quarterbacks coach	1	Widener University (1982)
Marty English	Linebackers coach	6	University of Northern Colorado (1986)
Chad Germer	Offensive line coach	6	University of Montana (1993)
Casey Glenn	Offensive line coach	2	Carroll College (2002)
Chris Knutsen	Special teams coordinator Outside linebackers coach	9	Valparaiso University (1977)
Jason Petrino	Director of football operations	3	Carroll College (2002)
Lance Robinson	Defensive line coach	6	University of Montana (1997)
Ron Wisniewski	Wide receivers coach Recruiting coordinator	6	Rutgers University (1987)
