= 2003 Wyoming Cowboys football team =

American college football season

2003 Wyoming Cowboys football
- Conference: Mountain West Conference
- Record: 4–8 (2–5 MW)
- Head coach: Joe Glenn (1st season)
- Offensive coordinator: Billy Cockhill (1st season)
- Offensive scheme: Multiple
- Defensive coordinator: Mike Breske (1st season)
- Base defense: 3–4
- Home stadium: War Memorial Stadium

2003 Mountain West Conference football standings
	Conf.			Overall
Team	W		L	W		L
No. 21 Utah $	6	–	1	10	–	2
New Mexico	5	–	2	8	–	5
Colorado State	4	–	3	7	–	6
Air Force	3	–	4	7	–	5
San Diego State	3	–	4	6	–	6
BYU	3	–	4	4	–	8
UNLV	2	–	5	6	–	6
Wyoming	2	–	5	4	–	8
$ – Conference champion; Rankings from AP Poll

The 2003 Wyoming Cowboys football team represented the University of Wyoming as a member Mountain West Conference (MW) during the 2003 NCAA Division I-A football season. Led by first-year head coach Joe Glenn, the Cowboys compiled an overall record of 4–8 record with mark 2–5 in conference play, tying for seventh place at the bottom of the MW. standings. The team played home games at War Memorial Stadium in Laramie, Wyoming.

Glenn was hired as Wyoming's new head football coach on December 12, 2002.

== Schedule ==
Date	Time	Opponent	Site	TV	Result	Attendance	Source
August 30	2:00 pm	Montana State*	War Memorial Stadium; Laramie, WY		W 21–10	17,407	
September 6	5:00 pm	at Oklahoma State*	Boone Pickens Stadium; Stillwater, OK	PPV	L 24–48	44,158	
September 13	2:00 pm	Kansas*	War Memorial Stadium; Laramie, WY		L 35–42	18,329	
September 20	12:00 pm	at Air Force	Falcon Stadium; USAFA, CO	SPW	L 29–35	38,622	
September 27	6:00 pm	at Boise State*	Bronco Stadium; Boise, ID		L 17–33	30,192	
October 12	6:00 pm	at Utah State*	Romney Stadium; Logan, UT (rivalry)		W 48–21	26,594	
October 18	4:00 pm	BYU	War Memorial Stadium; Laramie, WY	SPW	W 13–10	22,797	
October 25	8:00 pm	at San Diego State	Qualcomm Stadium; San Diego, CA	SPW	L 20–25	15,812	
November 1	1:00 pm	Colorado State	War Memorial Stadium; Laramie, WY (Border War)	ESPN Plus	W 35–28	18,511	
November 15	4:30 pm	at Utah	Rice–Eccles Stadium; Salt Lake City, UT	SPW	L 17–47	41,307	
November 22	12:00 pm	New Mexico	War Memorial Stadium; Laramie, WY		L 3–26	8,751	
November 29	12:00 pm	UNLV	War Memorial Stadium; Laramie, WY	SPW	L 24–35	8,419	
*Non-conference game; All times are in Mountain time
