= 2003 San Diego State Aztecs football team =

American college football season

2003 San Diego State Aztecs football
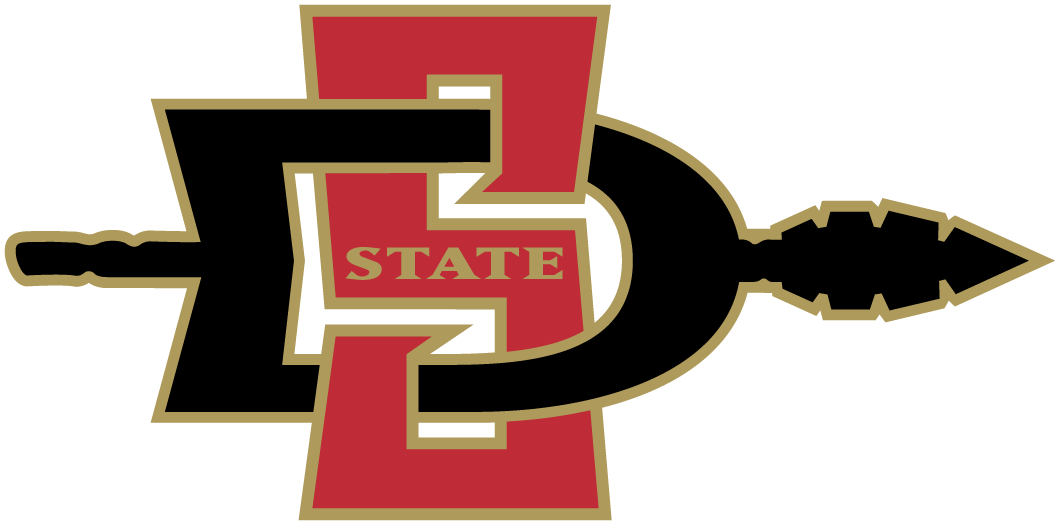
- Conference: Mountain West Conference
- Record: 6–6 (3–4 MW)
- Head coach: Tom Craft (2nd season)
- Offensive scheme: Spread
- Defensive coordinator: Thom Kaumeyer (2nd season)
- Base defense: 4–3
- Home stadium: Qualcomm Stadium

2003 Mountain West Conference football standings
| | Conf. | | | Overall |
| Team | W | | L | W | | L |
|---|---|---|---|---|---|---|
| No. 21 Utah $ | 6 | – | 1 | 10 | – | 2 |
| New Mexico | 5 | – | 2 | 8 | – | 5 |
| Colorado State | 4 | – | 3 | 7 | – | 6 |
| Air Force | 3 | – | 4 | 7 | – | 5 |
| San Diego State | 3 | – | 4 | 6 | – | 6 |
| BYU | 3 | – | 4 | 4 | – | 8 |
| UNLV | 2 | – | 5 | 6 | – | 6 |
| Wyoming | 2 | – | 5 | 4 | – | 8 |
$ – Conference champion; Rankings from AP Poll

The 2003 San Diego State Aztecs football team represented San Diego State University in the 2003 NCAA Division I-A football season. The Aztecs, led by head coach Tom Craft, played their home games at Qualcomm Stadium.

== Schedule ==
| Date | Time | Opponent | Site | TV | Result | Attendance | Source |
|---|---|---|---|---|---|---|---|
| August 30 | 6:00 pm | Eastern Washington* | Qualcomm Stadium; San Diego, CA | | W 19–9 | 21,145 | |
| September 6 | 9:00 am | at No. 2 Ohio State* | Ohio Stadium; Columbus, OH | ESPN Plus | L 13–16 | 104,433 | |
| September 13 | 6:05 pm | at UTEP* | Sun Bowl; El Paso, TX | | W 34–0 | 18,195 | |
| September 20 | 4:00 pm | Samford* | Qualcomm Stadium; San Diego, CA | | W 37–17 | 20,967 | |
| September 27 | 7:00 pm | at UCLA* | Rose Bowl; Pasadena, CA | FSNW2 | L 10–20 | 48,690 | |
| October 4 | 7:00 pm | BYU | Qualcomm Stadium; San Diego, CA | SPW | L 36–44 | 32,137 | |
| October 11 | 4:00 pm | at Utah | Rice–Eccles Stadium; Salt Lake City, UT | SPW | L 6–27 | 39,132 | |
| October 18 | 6:00 pm | New Mexico^{†} | Qualcomm Stadium; San Diego, CA | SPW | L 7–30 | 22,011 | |
| October 25 | 7:00 pm | Wyoming | Qualcomm Stadium; San Diego, CA | SPW | W 25–20 | 15,812 | |
| November 8 | 12:00 pm | at UNLV | Sam Boyd Stadium; Whitney, NV | ESPN Plus | W 7–0 | 20,896 | |
| November 15 | 12:00 pm | at Colorado State | Hughes Stadium; Fort Collins, CO | ESPN Plus | L 6–21 | 29,127 | |
| November 22 | 6:00 pm | Air Force | Qualcomm Stadium; San Diego, CA | SPW | W 24–3 | 23,682 | |
*Non-conference game; ^{†}Homecoming; Rankings from AP Poll released prior to the game; All times are in Pacific time
