= 2012 Hawaii Warriors football team =

American college football season

2012 Hawaii Warriors football
- Conference: Mountain West Conference
- Record: 3–9 (1–7 MW)
- Head coach: Norm Chow (1st season)
- Offensive coordinator: Tommy Lee (1st season)
- Offensive scheme: Pro-style
- Defensive coordinator: Thom Kaumeyer (1st season)
- Base defense: 4–3
- Home stadium: Aloha Stadium

2012 Mountain West Conference football standings
| | Conf. | | | Overall |
| Team | W | | L | W | | L |
|---|---|---|---|---|---|---|
| No. 18 Boise State + | 7 | – | 1 | 11 | – | 2 |
| Fresno State + | 7 | – | 1 | 9 | – | 4 |
| San Diego State + | 7 | – | 1 | 9 | – | 4 |
| Air Force | 5 | – | 3 | 6 | – | 7 |
| Nevada | 4 | – | 4 | 7 | – | 6 |
| Wyoming | 3 | – | 5 | 4 | – | 8 |
| Colorado State | 3 | – | 5 | 4 | – | 8 |
| UNLV | 2 | – | 6 | 2 | – | 11 |
| New Mexico | 1 | – | 7 | 4 | – | 9 |
| Hawaii | 1 | – | 7 | 3 | – | 9 |
+ – Conference co-champions; Rankings from AP Poll

The 2012 Hawaii Warriors football team represented the University of Hawaii at Manoa in the 2012 NCAA Division I FBS football season. They were led by first-year head coach Norm Chow and played their home games at Aloha Stadium. They were first year members of the Mountain West Conference. They finished the season 3–9, 1–7 in Mountain West play to finish in a tie for ninth place.

== New head coach ==
In December 2011, the university hired Norm Chow, a native Hawaiian who had most recently served as the offensive coordinator at Utah, as its head coach to replace the retiring Greg McMackin. With Chow's hiring, the Warriors abandoned the run and shoot offense that McMackin's predecessor June Jones installed and instead ran a pro-style offense.

== Schedule ==
| Date | Time | Opponent | Site | TV | Result | Attendance |
|---|---|---|---|---|---|---|
| September 1 | 1:30 pm | at No. 1 USC* | Los Angeles Memorial Coliseum; Los Angeles, CA | FOX | L 10–49 | 93,607 |
| September 15 | 6:00 pm | Lamar* | Aloha Stadium; Honolulu, HI | Oceanic PPV/ROOT | W 54–2 | 31,442 |
| September 22 | 4:30 pm | Nevada | Aloha Stadium; Honolulu, HI | NBCSN | L 24–69 | 31,417 |
| September 28 | 2:00 pm | at BYU* | LaVell Edwards Stadium; Provo, UT | ESPN | L 0–47 | 62,022 |
| October 6 | 2:00 pm | at San Diego State | Qualcomm Stadium; San Diego, CA | CBSSN | L 14–52 | 50,586 |
| October 13 | 6:00 pm | New Mexico^{†} | Aloha Stadium; Honolulu, HI | Oceanic PPV/ROOT | L 23–35 | 31,632 |
| October 27 | 1:00 pm | at Colorado State | Hughes Stadium; Fort Collins, CO | KTVD/Oceanic PPV/ROOT | L 27–42 | 16,573 |
| November 3 | 1:00 pm | at Fresno State | Bulldog Stadium; Fresno, CA (rivalry) | Oceanic PPV/TWCSN | L 10–45 | 30,755 |
| November 10 | 2:00 pm | Boise State | Aloha Stadium; Honolulu, HI | NBCSN | L 14–49 | 29,471 |
| November 16 | 3:30 pm | at Air Force | Falcon Stadium; Colorado Springs, CO (rivalry) | ESPN2 | L 7–21 | 25,313 |
| November 24 | 6:00 pm | UNLV | Aloha Stadium; Honolulu, HI | Oceanic PPV | W 48–10 | 28,359 |
| December 1 | 6:00 pm | South Alabama* | Aloha Stadium; Honolulu, HI | Oceanic PPV/ROOT/TWCSN | W 23–7 | 27,865 |
*Non-conference game; ^{†}Homecoming; Rankings from AP Poll released prior to the game; All times are in Hawaii time

== Game summaries ==
=== @ USC ===
| | 1 | 2 | 3 | 4 | Total |
|---|---|---|---|---|---|
| Warriors | 0 | 0 | 10 | 0 | 10 |
| #1 Trojans | 20 | 15 | 7 | 7 | 49 |

=== Lamar ===
| | 1 | 2 | 3 | 4 | Total |
|---|---|---|---|---|---|
| Cardinals | 0 | 0 | 0 | 2 | 2 |
| Warriors | 7 | 21 | 13 | 13 | 54 |

=== Nevada ===
| | 1 | 2 | 3 | 4 | Total |
|---|---|---|---|---|---|
| Wolf Pack | 14 | 20 | 21 | 14 | 69 |
| Warriors | 3 | 14 | 0 | 7 | 24 |

=== @ BYU ===
| | 1 | 2 | 3 | 4 | Total |
|---|---|---|---|---|---|
| Warriors | 0 | 0 | 0 | 0 | 0 |
| Cougars | 7 | 13 | 20 | 7 | 47 |

=== @ San Diego State ===
| | 1 | 2 | 3 | 4 | Total |
|---|---|---|---|---|---|
| Warriors | 0 | 7 | 7 | 0 | 14 |
| Aztecs | 14 | 21 | 3 | 14 | 52 |

=== New Mexico ===
| | 1 | 2 | 3 | 4 | Total |
|---|---|---|---|---|---|
| Lobos | 14 | 7 | 7 | 7 | 35 |
| Warriors | 0 | 10 | 7 | 6 | 23 |

=== @ Colorado State ===
| | 1 | 2 | 3 | 4 | Total |
|---|---|---|---|---|---|
| Warriors | 14 | 7 | 6 | 0 | 27 |
| Rams | 7 | 21 | 0 | 14 | 42 |

=== @ Fresno State ===
| | 1 | 2 | 3 | 4 | Total |
|---|---|---|---|---|---|
| Warriors | 0 | 3 | 0 | 7 | 10 |
| Bulldogs | 21 | 21 | 3 | 0 | 45 |

=== Boise State ===
| | 1 | 2 | 3 | 4 | Total |
|---|---|---|---|---|---|
| #24 Broncos | 21 | 14 | 7 | 7 | 49 |
| Warriors | 7 | 0 | 0 | 7 | 14 |

=== @ Air Force ===
| | 1 | 2 | 3 | 4 | Total |
|---|---|---|---|---|---|
| Warriors | 7 | 0 | 0 | 0 | 7 |
| Falcons | 0 | 7 | 14 | 0 | 21 |

=== UNLV ===
| | 1 | 2 | 3 | 4 | Total |
|---|---|---|---|---|---|
| Rebels | 0 | 0 | 0 | 10 | 10 |
| Warriors | 7 | 24 | 3 | 14 | 48 |

=== South Alabama ===
| | 1 | 2 | 3 | 4 | Total |
|---|---|---|---|---|---|
| Jaguars | 0 | 0 | 0 | 7 | 7 |
| Warriors | 10 | 6 | 7 | 0 | 23 |
