= 2003 Utah Utes football team =

American college football season

2003 Utah Utes football

Mountain West champion Liberty Bowl champion

Liberty Bowl, W 17–0 vs. Southern Miss
- Conference: Mountain West Conference

Ranking
- Coaches: No. 21
- AP: No. 21
- Record: 10–2 (6–1 MW)
- Head coach: Urban Meyer (1st season)
- Offensive coordinator: Mike Sanford (1st season)
- Offensive scheme: Spread option
- Defensive coordinator: Kyle Whittingham (9th season)
- Base defense: 4–3
- Home stadium: Rice-Eccles Stadium

2003 Mountain West Conference football standings
| | Conf. | | | Overall |
| Team | W | | L | W | | L |
|---|---|---|---|---|---|---|
| No. 21 Utah $ | 6 | – | 1 | 10 | – | 2 |
| New Mexico | 5 | – | 2 | 8 | – | 5 |
| Colorado State | 4 | – | 3 | 7 | – | 6 |
| Air Force | 3 | – | 4 | 7 | – | 5 |
| San Diego State | 3 | – | 4 | 6 | – | 6 |
| BYU | 3 | – | 4 | 4 | – | 8 |
| UNLV | 2 | – | 5 | 6 | – | 6 |
| Wyoming | 2 | – | 5 | 4 | – | 8 |
$ – Conference champion; Rankings from AP Poll

The Utah Utes 2003 football team represented the University of Utah in the 2003 NCAA Division I-A football season. This was Urban Meyer's first year coaching at the school, after being hired from Bowling Green. The team played its home games in Rice-Eccles Stadium.

== Schedule ==
| Date | Time | Opponent | Rank | Site | TV | Result | Attendance | Source |
|---|---|---|---|---|---|---|---|---|
| August 28 | 7:00 pm | Utah State* | | Rice–Eccles Stadium; Salt Lake City, UT (Battle of the Brothers) | | W 40–20 | 39,697 | |
| September 6 | 6:00 pm | at Texas A&M* | | Kyle Field; College Station, TX | KJZZ | L 26–28 | 74,019 | |
| September 11 | 5:45 pm | California* | | Rice–Eccles Stadium; Salt Lake City, UT | ESPN | W 31–24 | 46,768 | |
| September 27 | 4:30 pm | at Colorado State | | Hughes Stadium; Fort Collins, CO | KJZZ | W 28–21 | 29,117 | |
| October 3 | 8:00 pm | No. 19 Oregon* | | Rice–Eccles Stadium; Salt Lake City, UT | ESPN2 | W 17–13 | 44,676 | |
| October 11 | 5:00 pm | San Diego State^{†} | | Rice–Eccles Stadium; Salt Lake City, UT | KJZZ | W 27–6 | 39,132 | |
| October 18 | 1:00 pm | at UNLV | | Sam Boyd Stadium; Las Vegas, NV | ESPN Plus | W 28–10 | 26,241 | |
| October 25 | 1:00 pm | New Mexico | No. 24 | Rice–Eccles Stadium; Salt Lake City, UT | ESPN Plus | L 35–47 | 37,288 | |
| November 1 | 10:00 am | at Air Force | | Falcon Stadium; Colorado Springs, CO | ESPN2 | W 45–43 ^{3OT} | 30,004 | |
| November 15 | 4:30 pm | Wyoming | | Rice–Eccles Stadium; Salt Lake City, UT | KJZZ | W 47–17 | 41,307 | |
| November 22 | 1:00 pm | at BYU | | LaVell Edwards Stadium; Provo, UT (Holy War) | ESPN Plus | W 3–0 | 64,486 | |
| December 31 | 1:30 pm | vs. Southern Miss* | No. 25 | Liberty Bowl Memorial Stadium; Memphis, TN (Liberty Bowl) | ESPN | W 17–0 | 55,989 | |
*Non-conference game; ^{†}Homecoming; Rankings from Coaches' Poll released prior to the game; All times are in Mountain time

== Rankings ==
Ranking movements Legend: ██ Increase in ranking ██ Decrease in ranking — = Not ranked RV = Received votes
| | Week | | | | | | | | | | | | | | | | |
| Poll | Pre | 1 | 2 | 3 | 4 | 5 | 6 | 7 | 8 | 9 | 10 | 11 | 12 | 13 | 14 | 15 | Final |
|---|---|---|---|---|---|---|---|---|---|---|---|---|---|---|---|---|---|
| AP | — | — | — | — | — | — | RV | RV | RV | — | — | RV | RV | RV | RV | 25 | 21 |
| Coaches | RV | RV | — | RV | RV | RV | RV | RV | RV | RV | RV | RV | RV | RV | RV | 25 | 21 |
| BCS | Not released | | | | | | | | — | — | — | — | 24 | 22 | 23 | 22 | Not released |

== Game summaries ==
=== Utah State ===
| | 1 | 2 | 3 | 4 | Total |
|---|---|---|---|---|---|
| Aggies | 0 | 3 | 9 | 8 | 20 |
| Utes | 7 | 7 | 7 | 19 | 40 |

=== Texas A&M ===
| | 1 | 2 | 3 | 4 | Total |
|---|---|---|---|---|---|
| Utes | 0 | 0 | 13 | 13 | 26 |
| Aggies | 14 | 7 | 0 | 7 | 28 |

=== California ===
| | 1 | 2 | 3 | 4 | Total |
|---|---|---|---|---|---|
| Golden Bears | 0 | 7 | 17 | 0 | 24 |
| Utes | 14 | 7 | 0 | 10 | 31 |

=== Colorado State ===
| | 1 | 2 | 3 | 4 | Total |
|---|---|---|---|---|---|
| Utes | 0 | 14 | 7 | 7 | 28 |
| Rams | 0 | 7 | 0 | 14 | 21 |

=== Oregon ===
| | 1 | 2 | 3 | 4 | Total |
|---|---|---|---|---|---|
| Ducks | 3 | 10 | 0 | 0 | 13 |
| Utes | 3 | 7 | 0 | 7 | 17 |

=== San Diego State ===
| | 1 | 2 | 3 | 4 | Total |
|---|---|---|---|---|---|
| Aztecs | 3 | 3 | 0 | 0 | 6 |
| Utes | 0 | 0 | 13 | 14 | 27 |

=== UNLV ===
| | 1 | 2 | 3 | 4 | Total |
|---|---|---|---|---|---|
| Utes | 14 | 7 | 0 | 7 | 28 |
| Rebels | 0 | 7 | 3 | 0 | 10 |

=== New Mexico ===
| | 1 | 2 | 3 | 4 | Total |
|---|---|---|---|---|---|
| Lobos | 0 | 16 | 28 | 3 | 47 |
| Utes | 0 | 14 | 6 | 15 | 35 |

=== Air Force ===
| | 1 | 2 | 3 | 4 | OT | 2OT | 3OT | Total |
|---|---|---|---|---|---|---|---|---|
| Utes | 3 | 14 | 6 | 0 | 7 | 7 | 8 | 45 |
| Falcons | 0 | 7 | 0 | 16 | 7 | 7 | 6 | 43 |

=== Wyoming ===
| | 1 | 2 | 3 | 4 | Total |
|---|---|---|---|---|---|
| Cowboys | 7 | 10 | 0 | 0 | 17 |
| Utes | 7 | 10 | 16 | 14 | 47 |

=== BYU ===
| | 1 | 2 | 3 | 4 | Total |
|---|---|---|---|---|---|
| Utes | 0 | 3 | 0 | 0 | 3 |
| Cougars | 0 | 0 | 0 | 0 | 0 |

Utah beat BYU for the second straight year with this 3–0 victory. There was heavy snow fall for much of the game. The victory snapped BYU's NCAA record for scoring in 361 straight games—BYU's first shutout since a 20–0 loss to Arizona State on September 25, 1975.

=== Liberty Bowl: Utah vs. Southern Miss ===
| | 1 | 2 | 3 | 4 | Total |
|---|---|---|---|---|---|
| Utes | 0 | 7 | 0 | 10 | 17 |
| Golden Eagles | 0 | 0 | 0 | 0 | 0 |
