= 2003 New Mexico Lobos football team =

American college football season

2003 New Mexico Lobos football
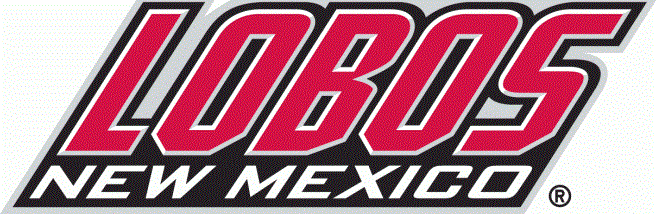

Las Vegas Bowl, L 14–55 vs. Oregon State
- Conference: Mountain West Conference
- Record: 8–5 (5–2 MW)
- Head coach: Rocky Long (6th season)
- Offensive coordinator: Dan Dodd (4th season)
- Offensive scheme: Multiple
- Defensive coordinator: Osia Lewis (1st season)
- Base defense: 3–3–5
- Home stadium: University Stadium

2003 Mountain West Conference football standings
	Conf.			Overall
Team	W		L	W		L
No. 21 Utah $	6	–	1	10	–	2
New Mexico	5	–	2	8	–	5
Colorado State	4	–	3	7	–	6
Air Force	3	–	4	7	–	5
San Diego State	3	–	4	6	–	6
BYU	3	–	4	4	–	8
UNLV	2	–	5	6	–	6
Wyoming	2	–	5	4	–	8
$ – Conference champion; Rankings from AP Poll

The 2003 New Mexico Lobos football team represented the University of New Mexico as a member of the Mountain West Conference (MW) during the 2003 NCAA Division I-A football season. Led by sixth-year head coach Rocky Long, the Lobos compiled an overall record of 8–5 with a mark of 5–2 in conference play, placing second in the MW. New Mexico was invited to the Las Vegas Bowl, where the Lobos lost to Oregon State. The team played home games at University Stadium in Albuquerque, New Mexico.

== Schedule ==
Date	Time	Opponent	Site	TV	Result	Attendance
August 30	6:00 pm	Texas State*	University Stadium; Albuquerque, NM		W 72–8	35,311
September 6	5:00 pm	at Texas Tech*	Jones SBC Stadium; Lubbock, TX		L 28–42	45,844
September 13	6:00 pm	BYU	University Stadium; Albuquerque, NM	SPW	L 7–10	33,606
September 20	3:00 pm	at No. 24 Washington State*	Martin Stadium; Pullman, WA	FSNNW	L 13–23	32,344
September 27	6:00 pm	New Mexico State*	University Stadium; Albuquerque, NM (Rio Grande Rivalry)		W 24–17	44,075
October 4	6:00 pm	Utah State*^{†}	University Stadium; Albuquerque, NM		W 34–7	31,435
October 18	7:00 pm	at San Diego State	Qualcomm Stadium; San Diego, CA	SPW	W 30–7	22,011
October 25	1:00 pm	at No. 23 Utah	Rice–Eccles Stadium; Salt Lake City, UT	ESPN Plus	W 47–35	37,288
November 1	6:00 pm	UNLV	University Stadium; Albuquerque, NM	SPW	L 35–37	29,179
November 7	7:00 pm	Colorado State	University Stadium; Albuquerque, NM	ESPN2	W 37–34	37,133
November 15	1:00 pm	Air Force	University Stadium; Albuquerque, NM		W 24–12	35,132
November 22	12:00 pm	at Wyoming	War Memorial Stadium; Laramie, WY		W 26–3	8,751
December 24	5:30 pm	vs. Oregon State*	Sam Boyd Stadium; Whitney, NV (Las Vegas Bowl)	ESPN	L 14–55	25,437
*Non-conference game; ^{†}Homecoming; Rankings from AP Poll released prior to the game; All times are in Mountain time
