= 2008 Armed Forces Bowl =

2008 Bell Helicopter Armed Forces Bowl
Houston Cougars	Air Force Falcons
(7–5)	(8–4)
C-USA	Mountain West
34	28
Head coach: Kevin Sumlin	Head coach: Troy Calhoun
	1	2	3	4	Total
Houston	17	0	7	10	34
Air Force	7	10	3	8	28
- Date: December 31, 2008
- Season: 2008
- Stadium: Amon G. Carter Stadium
- Location: Fort Worth, Texas
- MVP: RB Bryce Beall, Houston; FB Jared Tew, Air Force
- Favorite: Houston by 3.5
- Referee: Matt Loeffler (Sun Belt)
- Attendance: 41,127
- Payout: US$750,000 per team

United States TV coverage
- Network: ESPN
- Announcers: Terry Gannon, David Norrie
- Nielsen ratings: 1.4

The 2008 Bell Helicopter Armed Forces Bowl was the sixth edition of the annual post-season college football bowl game, and was a bowl rematch of a regular season game between the Houston Cougars against the Air Force Falcons that was won by Air Force, 31–28. It was played on December 31, 2008, at Amon G. Carter Stadium on the campus of Texas Christian University in Fort Worth, Texas, and telecast on ESPN nationally. The Falcons made their second straight Armed Forces Bowl appearance, having lost the previous year to California, while the Cougars made their fourth straight bowl appearance, having most recently lost to TCU. The Cougars defeated the Falcons 34–28, for their first bowl win since the 1980 Garden State Bowl ending an eight-bowl game losing streak.

== Scoring summary ==
Scoring Play	Score
1st Quarter
UH - Bryce Beall 1 yard TD run (Jordan Mannisto kick), 13:27	UH 7–0
AFA - Jared Tew 2 yard TD run (Ryan Harrison kick), 11:28	Tie 7–7
UH - Case Keenum 1 yard TD run (Mannisto kick), 8:10	UH 14–7
UH - Mannisto 22 yard FG, :04	UH 17–7
2nd Quarter
AFA - Tim Jefferson 5 yard TD run (Harrison kick), 9:52	UH 17–14
AFA - Harrison 44 yard FG, 2:28	Tie 17–17
3rd Quarter
UH - Keenum 4 yard TD run (Mannisto kick), 12:28	UH 24–17
AFA - Harrison 37 yard FG, 3:51	UH 24–20
4th Quarter
UH - Andre Kohn 13 yard TD pass from Keenum (Mannisto kick), 10:58	UH 31–20
AFA - Jared Tew 2 yard TD run (Jefferson run), 6:06	UH 31–28
UH - Mannisto 37 yard FG, 3:24	UH 34–28

== See also ==
- 2008–09 NCAA football bowl games
- List of college football post-season games that were rematches of regular season games
