= 2003 Air Force Falcons football team =

American college football season

2003 Air Force Falcons football
- Conference: Mountain West Conference
- Record: 7–5 (3–4 MW)
- Head coach: Fisher DeBerry (20th season)
- Offensive scheme: Wishbone triple option
- Defensive coordinator: Richard Bell (9th season)
- Base defense: 3–4
- Captains: Jeff Overstreet; Trevor Hightower; Joe Schieffer; Chance Harridge; Brett Huyser; Monty Coleman; John Rudzinski
- Home stadium: Falcon Stadium

2003 Mountain West Conference football standings
	Conf.			Overall
Team	W		L	W		L
No. 21 Utah $	6	–	1	10	–	2
New Mexico	5	–	2	8	–	5
Colorado State	4	–	3	7	–	6
Air Force	3	–	4	7	–	5
San Diego State	3	–	4	6	–	6
BYU	3	–	4	4	–	8
UNLV	2	–	5	6	–	6
Wyoming	2	–	5	4	–	8
$ – Conference champion; Rankings from AP Poll

The 2003 Air Force Falcons football team represented the United States Air Force Academy as a member of the Mountain West Conference (MW) during the 2003 NCAA Division I-A football season. Led by 20th-year head coach Fisher DeBerry, the Falcons compiled an overall record of 7–5 with a mark of 3–4 in conference play, placing in a three-way tie for fourth in the MW. The team played home games at Falcon Stadium in Colorado Springs, Colorado

== Schedule ==
Date	Time	Opponent	Site	TV	Result	Attendance	Source
August 30	12:00 p.m.	Wofford*	Falcon Stadium; Colorado Springs, CO		W 49–0	40,111	
September 6	11:00 a.m.	at Northwestern*	Ryan Field; Evanston, IL		W 22–21	21,722	
September 13	12:00 p.m.	North Texas*	Falcon Stadium; Colorado Springs, CO		W 34–21	32,541	
September 20	12:00 p.m.	Wyoming	Falcon Stadium; Colorado Springs, CO	SPW	W 35–29	38,622	
September 27	1:00 p.m.	at BYU	LaVell Edwards Stadium; Provo, UT	ESPN Plus	W 24–10	62,210	
October 4	11:30 a.m.	at Navy*	FedExField; Landover, MD (Commander-in-Chief's Trophy)	CN8	L 25–28	30,623	
October 11	1:00 p.m.	UNLV	Falcon Stadium; Colorado Springs, CO	ESPN Plus	W 24–7	43,873	
October 16	8:00 p.m.	at Colorado State	Hughes Stadium; Fort Collins, CO (rivalry)	ESPN2	L 20–30	32,701	
November 1	10:00 a.m.	Utah	Falcon Stadium; Colorado Springs, CO	ESPN2	L 43–45 ^{3OT}	30,004	
November 8	12:00 p.m.	Army*	Falcon Stadium; Colorado Springs, CO		W 31–3	50,108	
November 15	1:00 p.m.	at New Mexico	University Stadium; Albuquerque, NM		L 12–24	35,132	
November 22	7:00 p.m.	at San Diego State	Qualcomm Stadium; San Diego, CA	SPW	L 3–24	23,682	
*Non-conference game; All times are in Mountain time

== Roster ==
NO NAME, POS HT WT CL HOMETOWN

- 1 Overton Spence, LB 6-2 230 So Jacksonville, Florida (Jackson)
- 2 Rich Davis, HB 5-5 150 So Hamilton, New Jersey (Hamilton West)
- 3 Matt Ward, HB 5-11 175 So Fort Lauderdale, Florida (Stranahan)
- 4 Travis Thurmond, QB 5-10 190 Jr Jacksonville, Florida (Bolles)
- 5 Anthony Butler, HB 5-9 200 Jr Newark, California (Gunn)
- 6 Chris Sutton, CB 6-0 190 Fr Longview, Texas (Pine Tree)
- 7 Nate Allen, CB 5-10 180 Jr Converse, Texas (Judson)
- 9 Jason Brown, WR 6-4 210 So Arvada, Colorado (Arvada West)
- 10 Joe Schieffer, HB 5-10 185 Sr Indianola, Iowa (Indianola)
- 11 Chance Harridge, QB 5-11 190 Sr Bonaire, Georgia (Houston County)
- 12 Zach Myhra, QB 5-11 185 Jr La Crosse, Wisconsin (Logan)
- 14 Anthony Park, WR 5-11 175 Sr Las Vegas, Nevada (Las Vegas)
- 15 Darnell Stephens, HB 6-2 195 Jr Midwest City, Oklahoma (Midwest City)
- 16 Adam Fitch, QB 6-0 190 So Gillette, Wyoming (Campbell County)
- 17 Adrian Wright, ATH 6-0 200 Sr West Columbia, South Carolina (Lexington)
- 18 Joel Kurzdorfer, DB 6-0 190 Jr Warner Robins, Georgia (Houston County)
- 19 Jordan Wilkie, CB 5-11 180 Jr Eagan, Minnesota (Eagan)
- 20 Dan Shaffer, FB 5-11 230 Jr Lakewood, Colorado (Green Mountain)
- 21 Mark Carlson, FS 6-1 200 So Colorado Springs, Colorado (Santa Fe)
- 22 Jeff Overstreet, CB 5-10 185 Sr Killeen, Texas (Ellison)
- 24 Adam Cole, FB 6-0 225 Jr Dallas, Texas (Richardson)
- 25 Andy Braley, FS 6-0 195 So Valdosta, Georgia (Valdosta)
- 27 Dennis Poland, SS 6-3 210 So Pittsburgh, Pennsylvania (Central Catholic)
- 28 David Conley, CB 5-11 185 Jr Mesa, Arizona (West Lake)
- 29 Larry Duncan, FS 5-10 200 Sr San Diego, California (Mira Mesa)
- 30 Don Heaton, P 6-3 180 So Waterloo, Iowa (West)
- 31 John Taibi, FS 6-2 205 So Englewood, Colorado (Cherry Creek)
- 32 Felix Cole, ATH 6-1 210 Sr Linden, Texas (Linden-Kildare)
- 33 Kris Holstege, HB 5-10 190 Jr Caledonia, Michigan (South Christian)
- 34 Sean Rodgers, SS 5-11 195 Jr Fuquay Varina, North Carolina (Fuquay Varina)
- 35 Todd Hadley, CB 5-11 185 So Fountain Hills, Arizona (Fountain Hills)
- 36 Tyler Hess, SS 5-11 190 Jr Canyon Lake, California (Elsinore)
- 36 Chris Hicks, P 5-10 160 Fr Calhoun, Georgia (Calhoun)
- 37 Grant Mallory, SS 5-9 185 Jr Aurora, Colorado (Smoky Hill)
- 39 Alex Renshaw, HB 5-11 195 So Odell, Nebraska
- 40 Steve Massic, FB 5-11 230 Sr Fairfax Station, Virginia
- 42 Monty Coleman, Delaware 6-2 250 Sr Phoenix, Arizona (Brophy College Prep)
- 43 Robert Hutsell, FB 6-2 230 So Portland, Texas (Gregory-Portland)
- 44 Trevor Hightower, LB 6-0 230 Sr Plano, Texas (Plano)
- 45 Kenny Smith, LB 6-3 240 Jr Kirtland, New Mexico (Kirtland Central)
- 46 George Moore, FS 5-10 185 So Coppell, Texas (Coppell)
- 47 Chikaodi Akalanou, LB 6-0 212 So Hyrum, Utah (Mountain Crest)
- 48 John Rudzinski, LB 6-2 230 Jr Green Bay, Wisconsin (Notre Dame)
- 49 Cameron Hodge, LB 6-2 225 Jr Parker, Colorado (Ponderosa)
- 50 John Peel, C 6-2 260 Jr San Antonio, Texas (Smithson Valley)
- 52 Robert Price, LB 6-0 210 So Phoenix, Arizona (Deer Valley)
- 53 Ryan Carter, Delaware 6-2 250 Sr Waterloo, Wisconsin (Edgewood)
- 56 Jon Wilson, G 6-4 290 So Tampa, Florida (Hillsborough)
- 57 Ross Weaver, OT 6-7 265 So Parker, Colorado (Ponderosa)
- 58 Marchello Graddy, LB 6-1 235 Sr Wrightsville, Georgia (Johnson County)
- 59 Justin Wolcott, Delaware 6-2 215 So Abilene, Texas (Abilene)
- 60 Cory Crossetti, G 6-3 275 Sr Wilmette, Illinois (Loyola Academy)
- 61 Blane Neufeld, G 6-5 285 Sr Inman, Kansas (Inman)
- 63 Brett Huyser, G 6-5 300 Sr Rock Valley, Iowa (Community)
- 65 Larry Hufford, C 6-1 280 So Hamilton, Ohio (Badin)
- 66 Stephen Maddox, C 6-0 260 Sr Carrollton, Georgia (Carrollton)
- 68 Frank Willis, Delaware 6-1 220 So Navarre, Florida (Navarre)
- 69 Abe Leigh, OL 6-5 275 Jr Arvada, Colorado (Arvada West)
- 70 Brian Jarratt, G 6-5 270 Jr Three Rivers, Texas (Three Rivers)
- 71 Jacob Anderson, OT 6-5 280 Jr West Des Moines, Iowa (Valley)
- 72 Brett Thornton, OT 6-5 255 So Springfield, Missouri (Springfield)
- 73 Carston Stahr, Delaware 6-3 205 So Lincoln, Nebraska (Lincoln Christian)
- 74 Howard Turner, C 6-4 230 Sr Homestead, Florida (South Dade)
- 75 Jesse Underbakke, G 6-3 290 Sr Mabel, Minnesota (Mabel Canton)
- 77 Brett Waller, OT 6-7 285 Sr Oak Harbor, WA (Oak Harbor)
- 78 Nelson Mitchell, Delaware 6-1 245 So Houston, Texas (St. Thomas)
- 79 Scott Diehl, OT 6-6 285 Sr Springfield, Missouri (Kickapoo)
- 80 Erik Anderson, Delaware 6-8 220 So Eden Prairie, Minnesota (Eden Prairie)
- 82 Alec Messerall, WR 5-11 190 Jr Alexandria, Virginia (Northridge)
- 83 J.P. Waller, WR 6-3 195 Jr Bryan, Texas (Bryan)
- 84 Chris Charron, WR 6-2 190 Jr Grand Island, Nebraska (Northwest)
- 85 Zach Sasser, K 6-1 180 Jr Amarillo, Texas (Amarillo)
- 86 Adam Strecker, TE 6-6 250 Sr Littleton, Colorado (Kent Denver)
- 88 Russ Mitscherli, NG 6-2 260 So Victoria, Texas (Memorial)
- 89 John Schwartz, TE 6-2 235 Sr Pratt, Kansas (Pratt)
- 90 Charles Bueker, Delaware 6-5 265 Sr Camarillo, California (Adolfo Camarillo)
- 91 Robert McMenomy, TE 6-4 215 So Snellville, Georgia (South Gwinnett)
- 92 David Shaffer, NG 6-2 245 So Lakewood, California (Green Mountain)
- 93 Michael Greenaway, K 5-10 175 Jr Culpeper, Virginia (Culpeper)
- 95 Nicholas Taylor, NG 6-4 270 Sr Cincinnati, Ohio (Turpin)
- 96 Andrew Martin, P 6-4 215 Sr Lucas, Ohio (Lucas)
- 97 Joey Ashcroft, K 6-0 210 Sr Springfield, Missouri (Glendale)
- 98 Todd Jolly, TE 6-4 250 Sr Cherokee, Iowa (Washington)
- 99 Nathan Terrazone, Delaware 6-3 240 Jr La Crescenta, California (St. Francis)
