= 2003 Colorado State Rams football team =

American college football season

2003 Colorado State Rams football
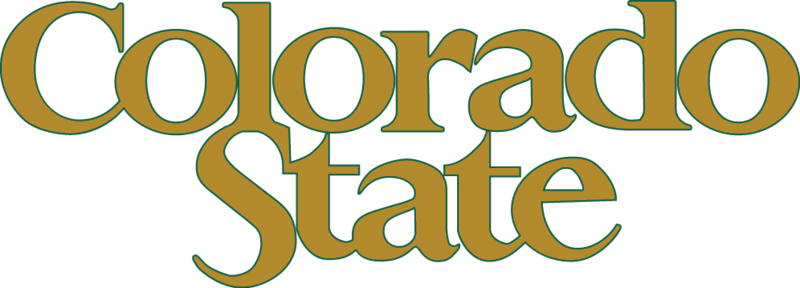

San Francisco Bowl, L 21–35 vs. Boston College
- Conference: Mountain West Conference
- Record: 7–6 (4–3 MW)
- Head coach: Sonny Lubick (11th season)
- Offensive coordinator: Dan Hammerschmidt (3rd season)
- Defensive coordinator: Steve Stanard (1st season)
- Home stadium: Sonny Lubick Field at Hughes Stadium

2003 Mountain West Conference football standings
| | Conf. | | | Overall |
| Team | W | | L | W | | L |
|---|---|---|---|---|---|---|
| No. 21 Utah $ | 6 | – | 1 | 10 | – | 2 |
| New Mexico | 5 | – | 2 | 8 | – | 5 |
| Colorado State | 4 | – | 3 | 7 | – | 6 |
| Air Force | 3 | – | 4 | 7 | – | 5 |
| San Diego State | 3 | – | 4 | 6 | – | 6 |
| BYU | 3 | – | 4 | 4 | – | 8 |
| UNLV | 2 | – | 5 | 6 | – | 6 |
| Wyoming | 2 | – | 5 | 4 | – | 8 |
$ – Conference champion; Rankings from AP Poll

The 2003 Colorado State Rams football team represented Colorado State University in the college football 2003 NCAA Division I-A football season. They played their home games at Hughes Stadium in Fort Collins, Colorado and were led by head coach Sonny Lubick.

== Schedule ==
| Date | Time | Opponent | Rank | Site | TV | Result | Attendance | Source |
|---|---|---|---|---|---|---|---|---|
| August 30 | 5:45 pm | at Colorado* | No. 23 | Invesco Field at Mile High; Denver, CO (Rocky Mountain Showdown) | ESPN | L 35–42 | 76,219 | |
| September 6 | 4:00 pm | at California* | | California Memorial Stadium; Berkeley, CA | FSN | W 23–21 | 34,096 | |
| September 13 | 1:00 pm | Weber State* | | Hughes Stadium; Fort Collins, CO | | W 31–7 | 28,611 | |
| September 20 | 1:00 pm | Miami (OH)* | | Hughes Stadium; Fort Collins, CO | | L 21–41 | 31,610 | |
| September 27 | 4:30 pm | Utah | | Hughes Stadium; Fort Collins, CO | SPW | L 21–28 | 29,117 | |
| October 4 | 1:00 pm | Fresno State*^{†} | | Hughes Stadium; Fort Collins, CO | | W 34–10 | 32,620 | |
| October 9 | 8:00 pm | at BYU | | LaVell Edwards Stadium; Provo, UT | ESPN | W 58–13 | 58,377 | |
| October 16 | 8:00 pm | Air Force | | Hughes Stadium; Fort Collins, CO (rivalry) | ESPN | W 30–20 | 32,701 | |
| November 1 | 1:00 pm | at Wyoming | | War Memorial Stadium; Laramie, WY (Border War) | ESPN Plus | L 28–35 | 18,511 | |
| November 7 | 7:00 pm | at New Mexico | | University Stadium; Albuquerque, NM | ESPN2 | L 34–37 | 37,133 | |
| November 15 | 1:00 pm | San Diego State | | Hughes Stadium; Fort Collins, CO | ESPN Plus | W 21–6 | 29,127 | |
| November 22 | 5:00 pm | at UNLV | | Sam Boyd Stadium; Whitney, NV | SPW | W 24–23 | 21,530 | |
| December 31 | 7:30 pm | vs. Boston College* | | Pacific Bell Park; San Francisco, CA (San Francisco Bowl) | ESPN2 | L 21–35 | 25,621 | |
*Non-conference game; ^{†}Homecoming; Rankings from AP Poll released prior to the game; All times are in Mountain time

== Roster ==
2003 Colorado State Rams football team roster
Players
Coaches
Offense

| Pos. | # | Name | Class |
|---|---|---|---|
| WR | 4 | David Anderson | So |
| QB | 11 | Bradlee Van Pelt | Sr |
| RB | 20 | Marcus Houston | Jr |
| OL | 63 | Mike Brisiel | So |
| OL | 70 | Mark Dreyer | Sr |
| OL | 71 | Clint Oldenburg | Fr |
| OL | 74 | Erik Pears | Jr |
| C | 77 | Albert Bimper | So |
| TE | 81 | Joel Dreessen | Jr |
| TE | 88 | Brandon Alconcel | So |

Defense

| Pos. | # | Name | Class |
|---|---|---|---|
| DB | 5 | Dexter Wynn | Sr |
| DE | 36 | Mike Vomhof | Jr |
| DE | 44 | Bob Vomhof | Fr |
| LB | 50 | Drew Wood | Sr |
| DE | 93 | Chris Kiffin | Jr |
| DT | 95 | Bryan Save | Sr |
| DE | 96 | Andre Sommersell | Sr |

Special teams

| Pos. | # | Name | Class |
|---|---|---|---|
| P | 8 | Jimmie Kaylor | Fr |

Head coach

- Sonny Lubick

Coordinators/assistant coaches

Legend

- (C) Team captain
- (S) Suspended
- (I) Ineligible
- Injured
- Redshirt

Roster
Last update: 2003-10-11

== Team players in the NFL ==
| Round | Pick | Player | Position | NFL club |
|---|---|---|---|---|
| 6 | 192 | Dexter Wynn | DB | Philadelphia Eagles |
| 7 | 250 | Bradlee Van Pelt | QB | Denver Broncos |
| 7 | 255 | Andre Sommersell | LB | Oakland Raiders |
