= 2008 Air Force Falcons football team =

American college football season

2008 Air Force Falcons football

Armed Forces Bowl, L 28–34 vs. Houston
- Conference: Mountain West Conference
- Record: 8–5 (5–3 MW)
- Head coach: Troy Calhoun (2nd season)
- Co-offensive coordinators: Clay Hendrix (2nd season); Blane Morgan (2nd season)
- Offensive scheme: Triple option
- Defensive coordinator: Tim DeRuyter (2nd season)
- Base defense: 3–4
- Captain: Game captains
- Home stadium: Falcon Stadium

2008 Mountain West Conference football standings
	Conf.			Overall
Team	W		L	W		L
No. 2 Utah $	8	–	0	13	–	0
No. 7 TCU	7	–	1	11	–	2
No. 25 BYU	6	–	2	10	–	3
Air Force	5	–	3	8	–	5
Colorado State	4	–	4	7	–	6
UNLV	2	–	6	5	–	7
New Mexico	2	–	6	4	–	8
Wyoming	1	–	7	4	–	8
San Diego State	1	–	7	2	–	10
$ – Conference champion and BCS representative as top non-AQ school to meet automatic qualification criteria; Rankings from AP Poll

The 2008 Air Force Falcons football team represented the United States Air Force Academy as a member of the Mountain West Conference (MW) during the 2008 NCAA Division I FBS football season. Led by second-year head coach Troy Calhoun, the Falcons compiled an overall record of 8–5 with a mark of 5–3 in conference play, placing fourth in the MW. Air Force was invited to the Armed Forces Bowl, where the Falcons lost to Houston. The team played home games at Falcon Stadium in Colorado Springs, Colorado

== Schedule ==
Date	Time	Opponent	Site	TV	Result	Attendance
August 30	12:00 p.m.	Southern Utah*	Falcon Stadium; Colorado Springs, CO		W 41–7	39,180
September 6	1:30 p.m.	at Wyoming	War Memorial Stadium; Laramie, WY	CBSCS	W 23–3	23,168
September 13	9:05 a.m.	at Houston*	Gerald Ford Stadium; Dallas, TX		W 31–28	2,546
September 20	2:00 p.m.	No. 20 Utah	Falcon Stadium; Colorado Springs, CO	Versus	L 23–30	36,952
October 4	2:00 p.m.	Navy*	Falcon Stadium; Colorado Springs, CO (Commander-in-Chief's Trophy)	Versus	L 27–33	46,339
October 11	7:30 p.m.	at San Diego State	Qualcomm Stadium; San Diego, CA	The Mtn	W 35–10	43,630
October 18	8:00 p.m.	at UNLV	Sam Boyd Stadium; Whitney, NV	The Mtn	W 29–28	21,055
October 23	6:00 p.m.	New Mexico	Falcon Stadium; Colorado Springs, CO	CBSCS	W 23–10	25,101
November 1	10:00 a.m.	at Army*	Michie Stadium; West Point, NY (Commander-in-Chief's Trophy)	ESPNU	W 16–7	37,409
November 8	4:00 p.m.	Colorado State	Falcon Stadium; Colorado Springs, CO (rivalry)	The Mtn	W 38–17	39,052
November 15	1:30 p.m.	No. 16 BYU	Falcon Stadium; Colorado Springs, CO	CBSCS	L 24–38	42,177
November 22	1:30 p.m.	at No. 15 TCU	Amon G. Carter Stadium; Fort Worth, TX	Versus	L 10–44	32,823
December 31	10:00 a.m.	vs. Houston*	Amon G. Carter Stadium; Fort Worth, TX (Armed Forces Bowl)	ESPN	L 28–34	41,127
*Non-conference game; Rankings from AP Poll released prior to the game

== Roster ==
- QB Tim Jefferson, Fr.
- WR Joe Brady, Fr. (Practice squad)
