= Bob Stockham =

American football player (born 1970)

Profile
- Position: Quarterback

Personal information
- Born: December 20, 1970 (age 55)
- Listed height: 6 ft 4 in (1.93 m)
- Listed weight: 230 lb (104 kg)

Career information
- College: Santa Rosa (1990–1991); UNLV (1992–1993)
- NFL draft: 1994: undrafted

Career history
- Portland Forest Dragons (1997)

Career AFL statistics
- Comp. / Att.: 19 / 44
- Passing yards: 252
- TD–INT: 3–2
- QB rating: 60.04
- Rushing TDs: 1
- Stats at ArenaFan.com

Bob Stockham (born December 20, 1970) is an American former professional football quarterback who played one season with the Portland Forest Dragons of the Arena Football League (AFL). He played college football at the University of Nevada, Las Vegas.

== Early life ==
Bob Stockham was born on December 20, 1970.

== College career ==
Stockham first played college football at Santa Rosa Junior College from 1990 to 1991. He threw for 3,506 yards and 35 touchdowns in 1990, earning junior college All-American honors. He recorded 1,985 passing yards for 19 touchdowns during the 1991 season. He was inducted into the Santa Rosa Junior College Hall of Fame in 2001.

Stockham was a two-year letterman for the UNLV Rebels of the University of Nevada, Las Vegas from 1992 to 1993. He completed 57 of 129 passes (44.2%) for 965 yards, nine touchdowns, and 11 interceptions in 1992. He totaled 19 completions on 44 passing attempts (43.2%) for 263 yards while also rushing for one touchdown during the 1993 season.

== Professional career ==
Stockham played in three games for the Portland Forest Dragons of the Arena Football League in 1997, completing 19 of 44 passes (43.2%) for 252 yards, three touchdowns, and two interceptions while also scoring a rushing touchdown.

== Personal life ==
Stockham was later an executive for the Young Electric Sign Company in Las Vegas. His daughter Tommi Stockham played for the Indiana Hoosiers women's volleyball team.
