= 2008 Colorado State Rams football team =

American college football season

2008 Colorado State Rams football
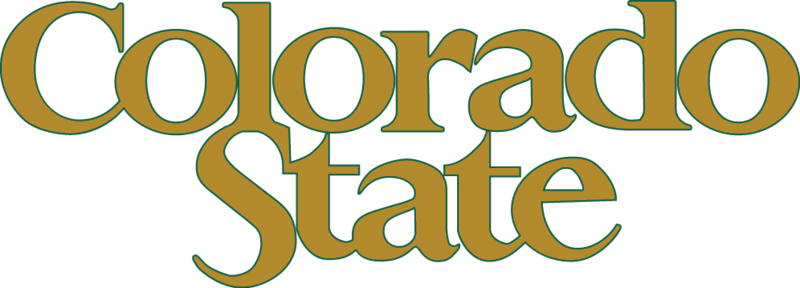

New Mexico Bowl champion

New Mexico Bowl, W 40–35 vs. Fresno State
- Conference: Mountain West Conference
- Record: 7–6 (4–4 MW)
- Head coach: Steve Fairchild (1st season)
- Offensive coordinator: Greg Peterson (1st season)
- Defensive coordinator: Larry Kerr (11th season)
- Home stadium: Sonny Lubick Field at Hughes Stadium

2008 Mountain West Conference football standings
| | Conf. | | | Overall |
| Team | W | | L | W | | L |
|---|---|---|---|---|---|---|
| No. 2 Utah $ | 8 | – | 0 | 13 | – | 0 |
| No. 7 TCU | 7 | – | 1 | 11 | – | 2 |
| No. 25 BYU | 6 | – | 2 | 10 | – | 3 |
| Air Force | 5 | – | 3 | 8 | – | 5 |
| Colorado State | 4 | – | 4 | 7 | – | 6 |
| UNLV | 2 | – | 6 | 5 | – | 7 |
| New Mexico | 2 | – | 6 | 4 | – | 8 |
| Wyoming | 1 | – | 7 | 4 | – | 8 |
| San Diego State | 1 | – | 7 | 2 | – | 10 |
$ – Conference champion and BCS representative as top non-AQ school to meet automatic qualification criteria; Rankings from AP Poll

The 2008 Colorado State Rams football team represented Colorado State University in the 2008 NCAA Division I FBS football season. They played their home games at Sonny Lubick Field at Hughes Stadium in Fort Collins, CO and were led by first year coach Steve Fairchild. They were members of the Mountain West Conference. They finished the season 7–6, 4–4 in Mountain West play to finish in fifth place. They were invited to the New Mexico Bowl where they defeated Fresno State.

== Schedule ==
| Date | Time | Opponent | Site | TV | Result | Attendance |
|---|---|---|---|---|---|---|
| August 31 | 10:00 a.m. | vs. Colorado* | Invesco Field at Mile High; Denver, CO (Rocky Mountain Showdown) | FSN | L 38–17 | 68,133 |
| September 6 | 1:30 p.m. | Sacramento State* | Hughes Stadium; Fort Collins, CO | | W 23–20 | 20,051 |
| September 20 | 8:00 p.m. | Houston* | Hughes Stadium; Fort Collins, CO | | W 28–25 | 21,539 |
| September 27 | 3:00 p.m. | at California* | California Memorial Stadium; Berkeley CA | CSNCA | L 42–7 | 63,970 |
| October 8 | 11:30 a.m. | UNLV | Hughes Stadium; Fort Collins, CO | mtn | W 41–28 | 19,703 |
| October 11 | 2:30 p.m. | TCU^{†} | Hughes Stadium; Fort Collins, CO | CBSCS | L 13–7 | 27,130 |
| October 18 | 7:15 p.m. | at No. 14 Utah | Rice-Eccles Stadium; Salt Lake City, UT | mtn | L 49–16 | 44,793 |
| October 25 | 7:30 p.m. | at San Diego State | Qualcomm Stadium; San Diego, CA | mtn | W 38-34 | 17,185 |
| November 1 | 4:00 p.m. | No. 17 BYU | Hughes Stadium; Fort Collins, CO | mtn | L 45–42 | 20,222 |
| November 8 | 4:30 p.m. | at Air Force | Falcon Stadium; USAFA, CO | mtn | L 38–17 | 39,052 |
| November 15 | 10:30 a.m. | New Mexico | Hughes Stadium; Fort Collins, CO | mtn | W 20–6 | 17,401 |
| November 22 | 12:00 p.m. | at Wyoming | War Memorial Stadium; Laramie, WY | mtn | W 31–20 | 18,569 |
| December 20 | 12:30 p.m. | vs. Fresno State* | University Stadium; Albuquerque, NM (New Mexico Bowl) | ESPN | W 40–35 | 24,735 |
*Non-conference game; ^{†}Homecoming; Rankings from AP Poll released prior to the game; All times are in Mountain time

== Roster ==
2008 Colorado State Rams football team roster
| Players | | | Coaches |
|---|---|---|---|
| Offense: Pos. / # / Name / Class; RB / 29 / Kyle Bell / Sr | Defense: Pos. / # / Name / Class; DE / 91 / Tommie Hill / Sr | Special teams: Pos. / # / Name / Class | Head coach: Steve Fairchild; Coordinators/assistant coaches Legend: (C) Team captain; (S) Suspended; (I) Ineligible; Injured; Redshirt; Roster |
