= Sam King (American football) =

American football player

Profile
- Position: Quarterback

Personal information
- Born: Los Angeles, California, U.S.

Career information
- High school: Washington (Westmont, California)
- College: LA Southwest (1977–1978); UNLV (1979–1981)
- NFL draft: 1982: undrafted

Career history
- Hamilton Tiger-Cats (1982)*; Arizona Wranglers (1983)*
- * Offseason or practice squad member only

Awards and highlights
- NCAA passing yards leader (1981)

Sam King is an American former football quarterback. He played college football for the UNLV Rebels, and led the country in passing yards in 1981.

== Early life ==
King was born in Los Angeles and grew up in poverty there. He played high school football at George Washington Preparatory High School in Westmont, California, as a quarterback. He earned All-Central City honors.

== College career ==
King first played college football at Los Angeles Southwest College from 1977 to 1978. He was named first-team All-Southern California Conference for the 1978 season.

In 1979, King transferred to play for the UNLV Rebels of the University of Nevada, Las Vegas. He competed with Larry Gentry for the starting quarterback job. King made his first start for UNLV in late September 1979 after Gentry was benched. Overall in 1979, King completed 103 of 188 passes (54.8%) for 1,594 yards, 12 touchdowns, and 10 interceptions while also rushing for 64 yards and five touchdowns. He fractured his thumb during spring practice in 1980 and ended up missing the entire season. On October 10, 1981, King completed 31 of 57 passes for 473 yards in a come-from-behind 45–41 victory over No. 8 BYU, who had won 17 straight games. In 2006, the Las Vegas Sun called it the "greatest victory in UNLV football history". King finished the season completing 255 of 433 passes (58.9%) for 3,778 yards, 18 touchdowns, and 19 interceptions while also scoring three rushing touchdowns. He led the country in passing yards, yards per attempt (8.7), and yards per game (314.8).

King was a quarterback for the West team at the 1982 Hula Bowl. He also played in the 1982 Japan Bowl, and won offensive player of the game honors after leading his team to a 28–17 victory while completing 26 of 41 passes for 310 yards, one touchdown, and one rushing touchdown. He was inducted into the UNLV Athletics Hall Of Fame in 1994.

== Professional career ==
After going undrafted in the 1982 NFL draft, King signed with the Hamilton Tiger-Cats of the Canadian Football League on May 26, 1982. He competed with fellow rookie Pete Gales for the team's third-string quarterback spot. On June 20, it was reported that King had been released.

In September 1982, King signed with the Arizona Wranglers of the upstart United States Football League (USFL) for the 1983 USFL season. However, on January 26, 1983, King was placed on the Wranglers' retired list after failing a physical. He had a heart murmur.

== Personal life ==
King later became the owner of a State Farm Insurance branch in Henderson, Nevada. His son, Sam Jr., played football at New Mexico State. His daughter, Sommer, played volleyball at the University of Nevada, Reno.
