= Devante Davis =

American football player (born 1992)

No. 89
- Position: Wide receiver

Personal information
- Born: October 13, 1992 (age 34); Houston, Texas, U.S.
- Listed height: 6 ft 3 in (1.91 m)
- Listed weight: 215 lb (98 kg)

Career information
- High school: Galena Park (TX) North Shore
- College: UNLV
- NFL draft: 2015: undrafted

Career history
- Philadelphia Eagles (2015)*
- * Offseason or practice squad member only

Awards and highlights
- Second-team All-MWC (2013)

Devante Davis (born October 13, 1992) is an American former professional football wide receiver. He played college football at UNLV.

== Early life ==
Davis attended North Shore Senior High School in North Shore, Houston, where he graduated in 2011. He lettered three times as a tight end under coach David Aymond, averaging more than 20 yards per catch and helping the Mustangs go 11–2 and earn a district title as a senior. Davis was also one of the state's top performers in track & field and was named All-district and All-state in the triple jump after leading the nation with a leap of 15.82 meters (51 feet, 9 inches), set at the District 21-5A Meet in 2011. He also played basketball.

== College career ==
Davis played college football at the University of Nevada, Las Vegas (UNLV) from 2011 to 2014. The former state champion in the triple jump chose the Rebels over offers that included a track scholarship from Texas A&M.

As a sophomore in 2012, Davis tallied a career-high 184 receiving yards against Louisiana Tech. He finished the season with 61 receptions for 854 yards.

In 2013, Davis caught 87 passes for 1,290 yards, and set a UNLV record with 14 touchdown receptions. He also helped lead the 2013 UNLV Rebels football team to its first bowl game in 13 seasons, and he caught 10 passes in the Heart of Dallas Bowl on New Year's Day 2014.

After considering declaring himself eligible for the NFL Draft after his junior season, Davis announced in January 2014 that he would return to UNLV for his senior season. He missed nearly half of the 2014 season due to injury, but tallied 163 receiving yards against Hawaii on November 22, 2014. With Davis hampered by injury, the 2014 UNLV Rebels football team compiled a 2–11 record.

Davis finished his college career ranked second in UNLV history with 2,785 receiving yards. He was invited to play in the 2015 Senior Bowl, but was unable to play due to a hamstring injury. Prior to Davis, no other offensive player from UNLV had been invited to play in the Senior Bowl since running back Ickey Woods in 1987.

== Professional career ==
=== 2015 NFL draft ===
Pre-draft measurables
Height	Weight	Arm length	Hand span	40-yard dash	10-yard split	20-yard split	20-yard shuttle	Three-cone drill	Vertical jump	Broad jump	Bench press	Wonderlic
6 ft 3 in (1.91 m)	220 lb (100 kg)	32 3/8 in (0.82 m)	9 1/2 in (0.24 m)	4.57 s	1.54 s	2.65 s	4.12 s	7.25 s	35 1/2 in (0.90 m)	10 ft 1 in (3.07 m)	16 reps	x
Values from ASU Pro Day

Davis went undrafted in the 2015 NFL draft but he was invited to the NFL scouting combine.

=== Philadelphia Eagles ===
Davis signed with the Philadelphia Eagles as an undrafted free agent May 4, 2015. He was waived on August 4, 2015.
