= 2008 TCU Horned Frogs football team =

American college football season

2008 TCU Horned Frogs football

Poinsettia Bowl champion

Poinsettia Bowl, W 17–16 vs. Boise State
- Conference: Mountain West Conference

Ranking
- Coaches: No. 7
- AP: No. 7
- Record: 11–2 (7–1 MW)
- Head coach: Gary Patterson (8th season)
- Offensive coordinator: Mike Schultz (11th season)
- Offensive scheme: Spread
- Defensive coordinator: Dick Bumpas (5th season)
- Base defense: 4–2–5
- Home stadium: Amon G. Carter Stadium

Uniform

2008 Mountain West Conference football standings
	Conf.			Overall
Team	W		L	W		L
No. 2 Utah $	8	–	0	13	–	0
No. 7 TCU	7	–	1	11	–	2
No. 25 BYU	6	–	2	10	–	3
Air Force	5	–	3	8	–	5
Colorado State	4	–	4	7	–	6
UNLV	2	–	6	5	–	7
New Mexico	2	–	6	4	–	8
Wyoming	1	–	7	4	–	8
San Diego State	1	–	7	2	–	10
$ – Conference champion and BCS representative as top non-AQ school to meet automatic qualification criteria; Rankings from AP Poll

The 2008 TCU Horned Frogs football team represented Texas Christian University in the 2008 NCAA Division I FBS football season. The team was coached by Gary Patterson. The Frogs played their home games at Amon G. Carter Stadium, which is located on campus in Fort Worth. The Horned Frogs finished the season 11–2, 7–1 in conference, and won the Poinsettia Bowl against #9 Boise State, 17–16.

== Schedule ==
Date	Time	Opponent	Rank	Site	TV	Result	Attendance
August 30	5:00 p.m.	at New Mexico		University Stadium; Albuquerque, NM	Versus	W 26–3	31,583
September 6	6:00 p.m.	Stephen F. Austin*		Amon G. Carter Stadium; Fort Worth, TX		W 67–7	27,074
September 13	12:00 p.m.**	Stanford*		Amon G. Carter Stadium; Fort Worth, TX	mtn.	W 31–14	25,531
September 20	7:00 p.m.	at SMU*		Ford Stadium; University Park, TX (rivalry)	CBSCS	W 48–7	30,923
September 27	6:00 p.m.	at No. 2 Oklahoma*	No. 24	Memorial Stadium; Norman, OK	FSN	L 10–35	85,158
October 4	5:00 p.m.	San Diego State		Amon G. Carter Stadium; Fort Worth, TX	mtn.	W 41–7	30,620
October 11	2:30 p.m.	at Colorado State		Hughes Stadium; Fort Collins, CO	CBSCS	W 13–7	27,130
October 16	7:00 p.m.	No. 8 BYU		Amon G. Carter Stadium; Fort Worth, TX	Versus	W 32–7	36,180
October 25	5:00 p.m.	Wyoming^{†}	No. 15	Amon G. Carter Stadium; Fort Worth, TX	mtn.	W 54–7	30,103
November 1	7:00 p.m.	at UNLV	No. 12	Sam Boyd Stadium; Whitney, NV	CBSCS	W 44–14	16,121
November 6	7:00 p.m.	at No. 10 Utah	No. 11	Rice–Eccles Stadium; Salt Lake City, UT	CBSCS	L 10–13	45,666
November 22	2:30 p.m.	Air Force	No. 14	Amon G. Carter Stadium; Fort Worth, TX	Versus	W 44–10	32,823
December 23	6:00 p.m.	vs. No. 9 Boise State*	No. 11	Qualcomm Stadium; San Diego, CA (Poinsettia Bowl)	ESPN	W 17–16	34,628
*Non-conference game; ^{†}Homecoming; Rankings from AP Poll released prior to the game; All times are in Central time

** Game was moved to an earlier start time due to Hurricane Ike

== Rankings ==
Ranking movements Legend: ██ Increase in ranking ██ Decrease in ranking — = Not ranked RV = Received votes т = Tied with team above or below
	Week																
Poll	Pre	1	2	3	4	5	6	7	8	9	10	11	12	13	14	15	Final
AP	—	RV^{T41}	RV^{T34}	RV^{28}	24	RV^{32}	RV^{31}	RV^{27}	15	12	11	15	15	14	11	11	7
Coaches	RV^{T43}	RV^{35}	RV^{32}	RV^{27}	23	RV^{33}	RV^{27}	24	15	12	11	18	17	14	11	11	7
Harris	Not released					RV^{29}	RV^{28}	RV^{27}	15	13	12	18	17	15	12	11	Not released
BCS	Not released								14	13	12	18	16	14	11	11	Not released

Note that superscript values are not official (below number 25) but are based on number of votes received in the various polls.
