= Adam Seward =

American football player (born 1982)

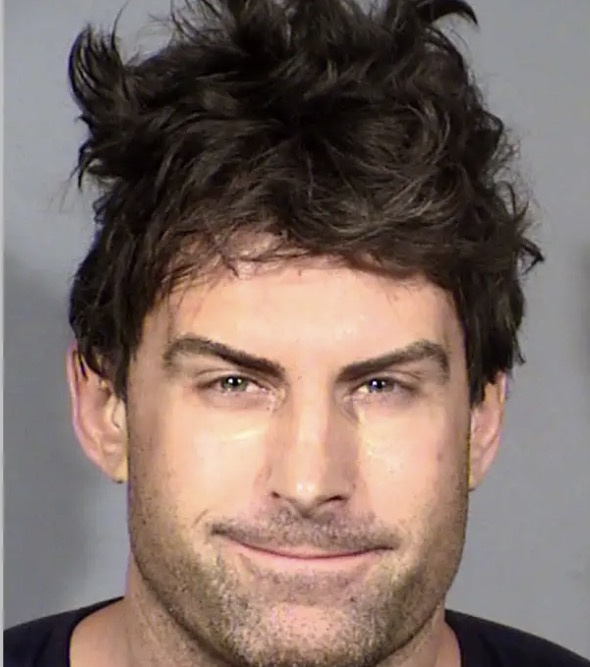

No. 59, 55
- Position: Linebacker

Personal information
- Born: June 15, 1982 (age 44); Champaign-Urbana, Illinois, U.S.
- Listed height: 6 ft 3 in (1.91 m)
- Listed weight: 250 lb (113 kg)

Career information
- High school: Bonanza (Las Vegas, Nevada)
- College: UNLV
- NFL draft: 2005: 5th round, 149th overall pick

Career history
- Carolina Panthers (2005–2008); Indianapolis Colts (2009)*; Jacksonville Jaguars (2009)
- * Offseason or practice squad member only

Awards and highlights
- First-team All-MW (2003); 2× Second-team All-MW (2002, 2004)

Career NFL statistics
- Total tackles: 46
- Fumble recoveries: 1
- Stats at Pro Football Reference

Adam Hartford Seward (born June 15, 1982) is an American former professional football player who was a linebacker in the National Football League (NFL). He was selected by the Carolina Panthers in the fifth round of the 2005 NFL draft after playing college football for the UNLV Rebels. Along with being a player for the Panthers, he also played for the Indianapolis Colts and Jacksonville Jaguars.

== Early life ==
Adam Hartford Seward was born on June 15, 1982, at Carle Clinic Hospital in Champaign-Urbana, Illinois. Seward attended Bonanza High School in Las Vegas, NV. He was a two-time All-State selection at linebacker and a starting running back. His biggest game came during his senior season at national powerhouse Bishop Gorman High School. Seward rushed for over 200 yards and two touchdowns, leading the Bengals, who were big underdogs, to an overtime victory over the Gaels. The game is currently Bonanza's last victory over Bishop Gorman in football.

In addition to football, he was a star athlete in track (shot put and discus), and won the Nevada state heavyweight title in wrestling. He and former UFC heavyweight champion Frank Mir, who were teammates in 1998, are among the 12 state wrestling champions in Bonanza High School's history.

== College career ==
Known as one of the top defensive players in the State of Nevada during his senior year, Seward opted to stay home and signed a scholarship offer to attend college in his hometown at the University of Nevada, Las Vegas, where he played four years for the Rebels. He became a starter during his freshman season and went on to be named All-Mountain West Conference three times. When he graduated in 2004, he left as both UNLV's and the Mountain West Conference's all-time leader in tackles (Though his UNLV record still stands, New Mexico's Carmen Messina would go on to break his MWC record during his final game of the 2011 season). He also had six sacks, six forced fumbles, four fumble recoveries, and two interceptions. Seward was also an active member of the Sigma Alpha Epsilon fraternity.

== Professional career ==
At the 2005 NFL combine, Seward (248 lbs.) was clocked at 4.56 in the 40-yard dash, leading many NFL scouts to believe that he would be a late second to early third round pick. However, scouts soon discovered a broken bone in his right foot, which caused his draft stock to fall dramatically. Nevertheless, Seward was selected by the Carolina Panthers in the fifth round (149th overall) of the 2005 NFL draft. Seward rapidly became a star special teams player and back-up linebacker during his rookie season. Over the course of his career with the Panthers, he was frequently known as one of Carolina's best special teams players. He also served as a backup to All-Pro linebackers Dan Morgan and Jon Beason. In 2008, with one of the best defenses in the NFL, Carolina compiled a record of 12–4 and won the NFC South.

After a successful four-year stint with the Panthers that include two playoff runs and a trip to the 2005 NFC Championship Game, Seward signed with the Indianapolis Colts as an Unrestricted Free Agent. Though released during the 2009 preseason, Seward would sign with the Jacksonville Jaguars the next day. He spent the 2009–10 season as a member of the Jaguars.

== Life after football ==
In 2010, after undergoing surgery to repair a sports hernia that required intensive repairs to not only the abdominal area, but also to several tendons in the right leg, Seward retired from the NFL and took a job with the NFL's representative office in Mexico City. He also hosted a Spanish-language radio show in Mexico City aimed at promoting football in Latin America. In 2011, he received two top-level Spanish-language certifications from Universidad Nacional Autonoma de Mexico.

After achieving success in Mexico, Seward was employed by the NFL's representative office in Beijing, China. In 2012, he served as a Chinese-language analyst for NFL football in China on Sina-Weibo.

In 2014, Seward was named the defensive coordinator of the Kyoto University football team in Kyoto, Japan.

Currently, Seward serves as the president of Goober Foundation Properties, Ltd., a real estate investment, management, and development firm. The company specializes in multi-family properties and land development with operations in four states.

== Personal life ==
Seward holds a master's degree in business administration from the University of Southern California. He is fluent in Spanish, Chinese, and Japanese.

His father, Tom, played for Eastern Illinois University, and was the co-captain of the squad which won the NCAA Division II football title in 1978. He later was an assistant coach for The University of Illinois, Howard University, University of Nevada Las Vegas, and Southern Illinois University. Seward's mother, Amy, was a cheerleader for the Chicago Bears.

His younger brother, Mark, played college football for the University of Nevada, Las Vegas.

== Legal problems ==
On March 16, 2021, was arrested for leaving the scene of an accident. A female passenger sustained serious injuries. On April 26, 2023, Seward was found guilty for his role in the incident two years prior, a hit and run crash that left the woman injured. In the aftermath, Seward received a year of probation and a 24–60 month suspended prison sentence. He was also ordered to complete a controlled substance abuse evaluation and submit to random testing. He also could not consume any alcoholic substances during the time of his probation.
