= 2008 San Diego State Aztecs football team =

American college football season

2008 San Diego State Aztecs football
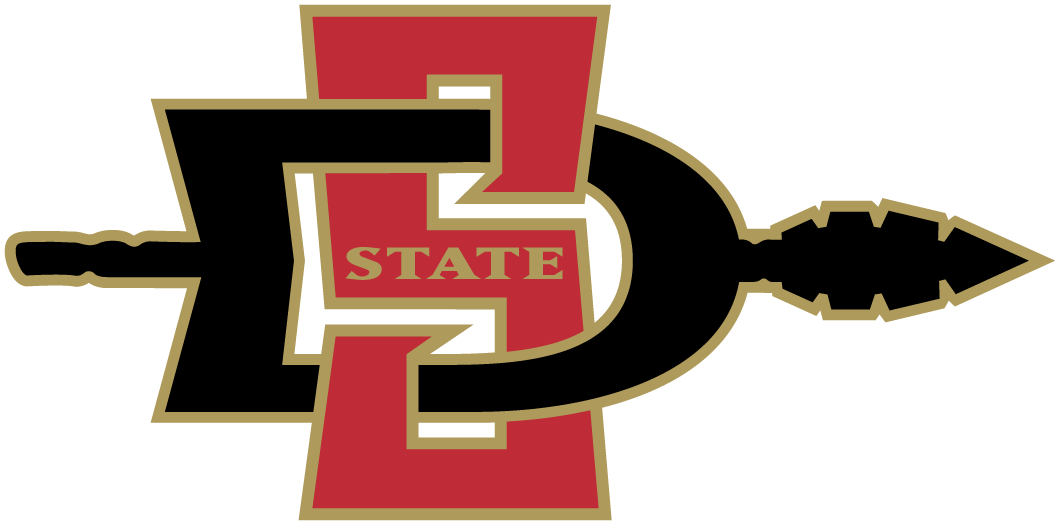
- Conference: Mountain West Conference
- Record: 2–10 (1–7 MW)
- Head coach: Chuck Long (3rd season)
- Offensive coordinator: Del Miller (3rd season)
- Offensive scheme: Spread
- Defensive coordinator: Bob Elliott (3rd season)
- Base defense: 4–3
- Home stadium: Qualcomm Stadium

2008 Mountain West Conference football standings
	Conf.			Overall
Team	W		L	W		L
No. 2 Utah $	8	–	0	13	–	0
No. 7 TCU	7	–	1	11	–	2
No. 25 BYU	6	–	2	10	–	3
Air Force	5	–	3	8	–	5
Colorado State	4	–	4	7	–	6
UNLV	2	–	6	5	–	7
New Mexico	2	–	6	4	–	8
Wyoming	1	–	7	4	–	8
San Diego State	1	–	7	2	–	10
$ – Conference champion and BCS representative as top non-AQ school to meet automatic qualification criteria; Rankings from AP Poll

The 2008 San Diego State Aztecs football team represented San Diego State University in the 2008 NCAA Division I FBS football season. They were coached by Chuck Long and played their home games at Qualcomm Stadium. The 2008 season was expected to be rough for the Aztecs after losing several key offensive players to the National Football League (NFL). The team looked to redshirt freshman quarterback Ryan Lindley to replace star quarterback Kevin O'Connell. The team also lost two of its leading wide receivers in Brett Swain and Chaz Schilens along with four starting offensive linemen.

== Schedule ==
Date	Time	Opponent	Site	TV	Result	Attendance
August 30	6:30 pm	Cal Poly*	Qualcomm Stadium; San Diego, CA	4SD	L 27–29	26,851
September 6	12:30 pm	at Notre Dame*	Notre Dame Stadium; Notre Dame, IN	NBC	L 13–21	80,795
September 13	5:00 pm	at San Jose State*	Spartan Stadium; San Jose, CA		L 10–35	17,185
September 27	5:00 pm	Idaho*	Qualcomm Stadium; San Diego, CA		W 45–17	21,401
October 4	3:00 pm	at TCU	Amon G. Carter Stadium; Fort Worth, TX	mtn.	L 7–41	30,620
October 11	6:30 pm	Air Force	Qualcomm Stadium; San Diego, CA	mtn.	L 10–35	43,630
October 18	3:00 pm	at New Mexico	University Stadium; Albuquerque, NM	mtn.	L 7–70	26,695
October 25	7:30 pm	Colorado State	Qualcomm Stadium; San Diego, CA	mtn.	L 34–38	17,185
November 1	11:00 am	at Wyoming	War Memorial Stadium; Laramie, WY	mtn.	L 10–35	11,779
November 8	11:00 am	at No. 17 BYU	LaVell Edwards Stadium; Provo, UT	mtn.	L 12–41	64,107
November 15	5:00 pm	No. 7 Utah	Qualcomm Stadium; San Diego, CA	mtn.	L 14–63	19,342
November 22	5:00 pm	UNLV	Qualcomm Stadium; San Diego, CA	CBSCS	W 42–21	17,846
*Non-conference game; Rankings from AP Poll released prior to the game; All times are in Pacific time

== Game summaries ==
=== Cal Poly ===
See also 2008 Cal Poly Mustangs football team

	1	2	3	4	Total
Mustangs	9	7	7	6	29
Aztecs	0	7	14	6	27

=== At Notre Dame ===
See also 2008 Notre Dame Fighting Irish football team

	1	2	3	4	Total
Aztecs	0	7	6	0	13
Fighting Irish	0	7	0	14	21

=== At San Jose State ===
See also 2008 San Jose State Spartans football team

	1	2	3	4	Total
Aztecs	0	7	3	0	10
Spartans	7	14	0	14	35

=== Idaho ===
See also 2008 Idaho Vandals football team

	1	2	3	4	Total
Vandals	0	3	0	14	17
Aztecs	7	17	14	7	45

=== At TCU ===
See also 2008 TCU Horned Frogs football team

	1	2	3	4	Total
Aztecs	0	0	7	0	7
Horned Frogs	3	17	7	14	41

=== Air Force ===
See also 2008 Air Force Falcons football team

	1	2	3	4	Total
Falcons	7	0	14	14	35
Aztecs	0	10	0	0	10

=== At New Mexico ===
See also 2008 New Mexico Lobos football team

	1	2	3	4	Total
Aztecs	0	0	7	0	7
Lobos	21	28	7	14	70

=== Colorado State ===
See also 2008 Colorado State Rams football team

	1	2	3	4	Total
Rams	3	7	21	7	38
Aztecs	7	10	14	3	34

=== At Wyoming ===
	1	2	3	4	Total
Aztecs	3	0	7	0	10
Cowboys	7	21	7	0	35

=== At No. 17 BYU ===
	1	2	3	4	Total
Aztecs	0	0	6	6	12
No. 17 Cougars	7	13	7	14	41

This will be the 33rd game between San Diego State and BYU.

BYU Leads Series 25-7-1

=== Utah ===
See also 2008 Utah Utes football team

	1	2	3	4	Total
Utes	14	21	0	28	63
Aztecs	0	7	7	0	14

=== UNLV ===
	1	2	3	4	Total
Running Rebels	7	0	7	7	21
Aztecs	7	7	7	21	42

== Awards ==
1st Team Preseason All Mountain West- LB Russell Allen

2nd Team Preseason All Mountain West- WR Darren Mougey and LB Luke Laolagi

3rd Team Preseason All Mountain West- WR Vincent Brown and DB Corey Boudreaux
