= 2003 UNLV Rebels football team =

American college football season

2003 UNLV Rebels football
- Conference: Mountain West Conference
- Record: 6–6 (2–5 MW)
- Head coach: John Robinson (5th season)
- Offensive coordinator: Rob Boras (3rd season)
- Defensive coordinator: Mike Bradeson (4th season)
- Home stadium: Sam Boyd Stadium

2003 Mountain West Conference football standings
	Conf.			Overall
Team	W		L	W		L
No. 21 Utah $	6	–	1	10	–	2
New Mexico	5	–	2	8	–	5
Colorado State	4	–	3	7	–	6
Air Force	3	–	4	7	–	5
San Diego State	3	–	4	6	–	6
BYU	3	–	4	4	–	8
UNLV	2	–	5	6	–	6
Wyoming	2	–	5	4	–	8
$ – Conference champion; Rankings from AP Poll

The 2003 UNLV Rebels football team represented the University of Nevada, Las Vegas (UNLV) as a member of the Mountain West Conference (MW) during the 2003 NCAA Division I-A football season. Led by fifth-year head coach John Robinson, the Rebels compiled an overall record of 6–6 record with mark of 2–5 in conference play, tying for seventh place at the bottom of the MW standings. The team played home games at Sam Boyd Stadium in Whitney, Nevada.

== Schedule ==
Date	Time	Opponent	Site	TV	Result	Attendance
August 29	6:00 p.m.	Toledo*	Sam Boyd Stadium; Whitney, NV	ESPN	W 28–18	21,791
September 6	4:00 p.m.	at Kansas*	Memorial Stadium; Lawrence, KS		L 24–46	33,980
September 13	9:00 a.m.	at No. 14 Wisconsin*	Camp Randall Stadium; Madison, WI	ESPN2	W 23–5	78,043
September 19	6:00 p.m.	Hawaii*	Sam Boyd Stadium; Whitney, NV	ESPN2	W 33–22	34,287
October 4	7:00 p.m.	at Nevada*	Mackay Stadium; Reno, NV (Fremont Cannon)	ESPN Plus	W 16–12	31,900
October 11	12:00 p.m.	at Air Force	Falcon Stadium; Colorado Springs, CO	ESPN+	L 7–24	43,873
October 18	12:00 p.m.	Utah^{†}	Sam Boyd Stadium; Whitney, NV	ESPN Plus	L 10–28	26,241
October 25	4:00 p.m.	BYU	Sam Boyd Stadium; Whitney, NV	ABC	L 20–27 ^{OT}	30,084
November 1	5:00 p.m.	at New Mexico	University Stadium; Albuquerque, NM	SPW	W 37–35	29,179
November 8	12:00 p.m.	San Diego State	Sam Boyd Stadium; Whitney, NV	ESPN Plus	L 0–7	20,896
November 22	4:00 p.m.	Colorado State	Sam Boyd Stadium; Whitney, NV	SPW	L 23–24	21,530
November 29	11:00 a.m.	at Wyoming	War Memorial Stadium; Laramie, WY		W 35–24	8,419
*Non-conference game; ^{†}Homecoming; Rankings from AP Poll released prior to the game; All times are in Pacific time
