= 2008 New Mexico Lobos football team =

American college football season

2008 New Mexico Lobos football
- Conference: Mountain West Conference
- Record: 4–8 (2–6 MW)
- Head coach: Rocky Long (11th season)
- Offensive coordinator: Dave Baldwin (2nd season)
- Offensive scheme: Spread
- Defensive coordinator: Troy Reffett (1st season)
- Base defense: 3–3–5
- Home stadium: University Stadium

2008 Mountain West Conference football standings
	Conf.			Overall
Team	W		L	W		L
No. 2 Utah $	8	–	0	13	–	0
No. 7 TCU	7	–	1	11	–	2
No. 25 BYU	6	–	2	10	–	3
Air Force	5	–	3	8	–	5
Colorado State	4	–	4	7	–	6
UNLV	2	–	6	5	–	7
New Mexico	2	–	6	4	–	8
Wyoming	1	–	7	4	–	8
San Diego State	1	–	7	2	–	10
$ – Conference champion and BCS representative as top non-AQ school to meet automatic qualification criteria; Rankings from AP Poll

The 2008 New Mexico Lobos football team represented the University of New Mexico as a member of the Mountain West Conference (MW) during the 2008 NCAA Division I FBS football season. Led by Rocky Long in his 11th and final season as head coach, the Lobos compiled an overall record of 4–8 with a mark of 2–6 in conference play, tying for sixth place in the MW. The team played home games at University Stadium in Albuquerque, New Mexico.

After starting the season with two losses, the Lobos upset ten-point favorites Arizona, 36–28. Against ninth-ranked BYU, New Mexico had a fourth quarter touchdown overturned due to a controversial penalty call. On fourth down with 21 yards to go, the Lobos then failed to convert for a first down. BYU scored on their next possession to clinch the victory, 21–3. New Mexico also played a close game against 10th-ranked Utah, which finished the season undefeated and finished No. 2 in the nation. The Lobos were stopped at the Utes' goal line on fourth down, and lost by a three-point margin.

2008 was the Lobos' first losing season in conference play since 2000. After the season, Long resigned as head coach. He was replaced by former Illinois offensive coordinator, Mike Locksley.

== Schedule ==
Date	Time	Opponent	Site	TV	Result	Attendance
August 30	4:00 pm	TCU	University Stadium; Albuquerque, NM	Versus	L 3–26	31,583
September 6	3:00 pm	Texas A&M*	University Stadium; Albuquerque, NM	Versus	L 22–28	28,007
September 13	6:00 pm	Arizona*	University Stadium; Albuquerque, NM (rivalry)	CBSCS	W 36–28	32,337
September 20	5:00 pm	at Tulsa*	Chapman Stadium; Tulsa, OK		L 14–56	30,000
September 27	6:00 pm	at New Mexico State*	Aggie Memorial Stadium; Las Cruces, NM (Rio Grande Rivalry)	CN10	W 35–24	30,343
October 4	7:30 pm	Wyoming^{†}	University Stadium; Albuquerque, NM	mtn	W 24–0	28,752
October 11	4:00 pm	at No. 9 BYU	LaVell Edwards Stadium; Provo, UT	mtn	L 3–21	64,105
October 18	4:00 pm	San Diego State	University Stadium; Albuquerque, NM	mtn	W 70–7	26,695
October 23	6:00 pm	at Air Force	Falcon Stadium; Colorado Springs, CO	CBSCS	L 10–23	25,101
November 1	7:30 pm	No. 10 Utah	University Stadium; Albuquerque, NM	mtn	L 10–13	30,901
November 8	8:00 pm	at UNLV	Sam Boyd Stadium; Whitney, NV		L 20–27	13,154
November 15	12:00 pm	at Colorado State	Hughes Stadium; Fort Collins, CO	mtn	L 6–20	17,401
*Non-conference game; ^{†}Homecoming; Rankings from AP Poll released prior to the game; All times are in Mountain time
