= Nate Hawkins =

American football player (1950–2021)

No. 86
- Position: Wide receiver

Personal information
- Born: February 8, 1950; Houston, Texas, U.S.
- Died: January 31, 2021 (aged 70); Houston, Texas, U.S.
- Listed height: 6 ft 1 in (1.85 m)
- Listed weight: 190 lb (86 kg)

Career information
- High school: Booker T. Washington (Houston)
- College: UNLV
- NFL draft: 1972: 16th round, 403rd overall pick

Career history
- Houston Oilers (1975)

Career NFL statistics
- Games played: 11
- Receiving yards: 32
- Receptions: 1
- Stats at Pro Football Reference

Nathaniel Alfred Hawkins (February 8, 1950 – January 31, 2021) was an American professional football wide receiver who played one season with the Houston Oilers of the National Football League (NFL). He played college football for UNLV Rebels football team and was selected by the Pittsburgh Steelers in the 16th round of the 1972 NFL draft.

Hawkins died from COVID-19 on January 31, 2021, eight days before his 71st birthday, amidst the COVID-19 pandemic in Texas.
