= 2012 UNLV Rebels football team =

American college football season

2012 UNLV Rebels football
- Conference: Mountain West Conference
- Record: 2–11 (2–6 MW)
- Head coach: Bobby Hauck (3rd season)
- Offensive coordinator: Brent Myers (1st season)
- Defensive coordinator: J. D. Williams (1st season)
- Home stadium: Sam Boyd Stadium

2012 Mountain West Conference football standings
	Conf.			Overall
Team	W		L	W		L
No. 18 Boise State +	7	–	1	11	–	2
Fresno State +	7	–	1	9	–	4
San Diego State +	7	–	1	9	–	4
Air Force	5	–	3	6	–	7
Nevada	4	–	4	7	–	6
Wyoming	3	–	5	4	–	8
Colorado State	3	–	5	4	–	8
UNLV	2	–	6	2	–	11
New Mexico	1	–	7	4	–	9
Hawaii	1	–	7	3	–	9
+ – Conference co-champions; Rankings from AP Poll

The 2012 UNLV Rebels football team represented the University of Nevada, Las Vegas (UNLV) as a member of the Mountain West Conference (MW) during the 2012 NCAA Division I FBS football season. Led by third-year head coach Bobby Hauck, the Rebels compiled an overall record of 2–11 record with mark of 2–6 in conference play, placing eighth the MW. The team played home games at Sam Boyd Stadium in Whitney, Nevada.

== Schedule ==
Date	Time	Opponent	Site	TV	Result	Attendance
August 30	8:00 p.m.	Minnesota*	Sam Boyd Stadium; Whitney, NV	CBSSN	L 27–30 ^{3OT}	16,013
September 8	7:00 p.m.	Northern Arizona*	Sam Boyd Stadium; Whitney, NV		L 14–17	15,257
September 14	6:00 p.m.	Washington State*	Sam Boyd Stadium; Whitney, NV	ESPN	L 27–35	17,015
September 22	7:00 p.m.	Air Force	Sam Boyd Stadium; Whitney, NV	ALT	W 38–35	14,054
September 29	5:00 p.m.	at Utah State*	Romney Stadium; Logan, UT	ESPN3	L 13–35	24,226
October 6	4:00 p.m.	at Louisiana Tech*	Joe Aillet Stadium; Ruston, LA	ESPN3, ESPN Plus	L 31–58	21,850
October 13	12:00 p.m.	Nevada	Sam Boyd Stadium; Whitney, NV (Fremont Cannon)	TWCSN	L 37–42	20,565
October 20	12:30 p.m.	at No. 22 Boise State	Bronco Stadium; Boise, ID	NBCSN	L 7–32	36,012
October 27	5:00 p.m.	at San Diego State	Qualcomm Stadium; San Diego, CA	TWCSN	L 13–24	23,874
November 3	1:00 p.m.	New Mexico^{†}	Sam Boyd Stadium; Whitney, NV	TWCSN	W 35–7	12,835
November 10	4:00 p.m.	at Colorado State	Hughes Stadium; Fort Collins, CO	TWCSN, KTVD, RTRM	L 11–33	13,887
November 17	1:00 p.m.	Wyoming	Sam Boyd Stadium; Whitney, NV	TWCSN	L 23–28	10,717
November 24	8:00 p.m.	at Hawaii	Aloha Stadium; Halawa, HI	Oceanic PPV, ESPN3	L 10–48	28,359
*Non-conference game; ^{†}Homecoming; Rankings from AP Poll released prior to the game; All times are in Pacific time

== Game summaries ==
=== Minnesota ===
	1	2	3	4	OT	2OT	3OT	Total
Golden Gophers	0	7	0	6	7	7	3	30
Rebels	3	0	7	3	7	7	0	27

=== Northern Arizona ===
	1	2	3	4	Total
Lumberjacks	0	0	7	10	17
Rebels	7	7	0	0	14

This is the second straight year the Rebels were defeated by a team from the NCAA Division I Football Championship Subdivision (FCS) after falling to Southern Utah in 2011.

=== Washington State ===
	1	2	3	4	Total
Cougars	14	14	0	7	35
Rebels	7	13	0	7	27

=== Air Force ===
	1	2	3	4	Total
Falcons	14	14	0	7	35
Rebels	7	10	14	7	38

=== At Utah State ===
	1	2	3	4	Total
Rebels	0	7	6	0	13
Aggies	0	20	0	15	35

=== At Louisiana Tech ===
	1	2	3	4	Total
Rebels	7	10	7	7	31
Bulldogs	20	7	17	14	58

=== Nevada ===
	1	2	3	4	Total
Wolf Pack	0	14	7	21	42
Rebels	14	17	0	6	37

=== At Boise State ===
	1	2	3	4	Total
Rebels	0	0	0	7	7
No. 22 Broncos	8	17	7	0	32

=== At San Diego State ===
	1	2	3	4	Total
Rebels	6	0	7	0	13
Aztecs	7	7	7	3	24

=== New Mexico ===
	1	2	3	4	Total
Lobos	0	0	7	0	7
Rebels	7	14	7	7	35

=== At Colorado State ===
	1	2	3	4	Total
Rebels	0	0	0	11	11
Rams	7	17	3	6	33

=== Wyoming ===
	1	2	3	4	Total
Cowboys	14	14	0	0	28
Rebels	7	10	0	6	23

=== At Hawaii ===
	1	2	3	4	Total
Rebels	0	0	0	10	10
Warriors	7	24	3	14	48
