= Omar Clayton =

American football player (born 1989)

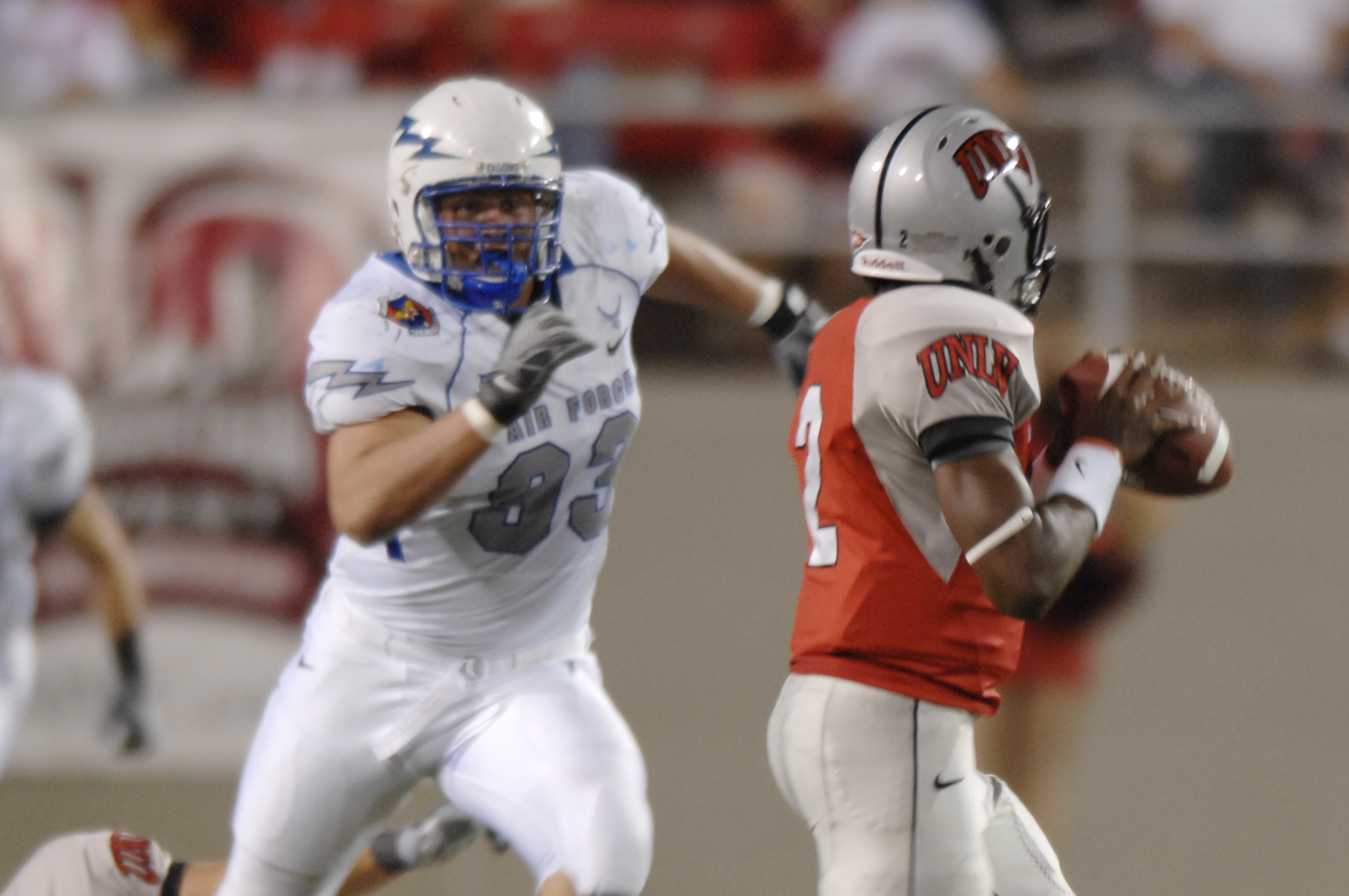
- Clayton in the pocket against Air Force in 2008

No. 2
- Position: Quarterback

Personal information
- Born: July 30, 1989 (age 37); Decatur, Illinois, U.S.
- Listed height: 6 ft 1 in (1.85 m)
- Listed weight: 210 lb (95 kg)

Career information
- High school: Normal (IL) Community
- College: UNLV (2007–2010)
- NFL draft: 2011: undrafted

Omar A. Clayton (born July 30, 1989) is an American former football quarterback. He played college football for the UNLV Rebels at the University of Nevada, Las Vegas.

== Early life ==
Clayton was born in Decatur, Illinois, to parents Dameon Clayton and Kelly Bradford. He attended Normal Community High School, where he played football during his freshman year. His family then moved to Texas, where he attended Plano East Senior High School, which employed a spread offense. He returned to Illinois and Normal Community for his senior season, where he led the team from the I-formation. That year, he recorded 82 completions on 144 pass attempts for 1,080 yards and 13 touchdowns, and had 128 carries for 630 yards and 10 touchdowns. Clayton led his team to the Illinois High School Association (IHSA) 6A state championship and a perfect 14–0 record. The Pantagraph named him the Player of the Year. Clayton was also named the Big 12 Conference most valuable offensive player and an all-state selection.

== College career ==
Clayton enrolled at the University of Nevada, Las Vegas, where he studied political science. In 2007, he walked onto the football team, and during the preseason, secured a position as the third-string quarterback. By Week 8, he was promoted to the starting position, and Clayton started three games before he fractured his hand. During the season, he recorded 58 completions on 95 attempts for 618 yards and four touchdowns, and 179 rushing yards and two touchdowns. His 61.1% completion rate set the school record for a freshman.

In 2008, Clayton completed 152 of 258 pass attempts for 1,894 yards, 18 touchdowns, and four interceptions, before he suffered an injury that forced him to miss the final three games. Prior to the 2009 season, Clayton was ranked 13th in terms of passing yards for a UNLV quarterback after having played in just 16 games. Athlon Sports named him a preseason All-Mountain West Conference (MWC) second team. The New York Times predicted UNLV to reach bowl eligibility in 2009 largely because of Clayton, who when healthy, "can score enough points to keep the team in most games".
