= 2008 UNLV Rebels football team =

American college football season

2008 UNLV Rebels football
- Conference: Mountain West Conference
- Record: 5–7 (2–6 MW)
- Head coach: Mike Sanford Sr. (4th season)
- Offensive coordinator: Todd Berry (2nd season)
- Defensive coordinator: Dennis Therrell (1st season)
- Home stadium: Sam Boyd Stadium

2008 Mountain West Conference football standings
	Conf.			Overall
Team	W		L	W		L
No. 2 Utah $	8	–	0	13	–	0
No. 7 TCU	7	–	1	11	–	2
No. 25 BYU	6	–	2	10	–	3
Air Force	5	–	3	8	–	5
Colorado State	4	–	4	7	–	6
UNLV	2	–	6	5	–	7
New Mexico	2	–	6	4	–	8
Wyoming	1	–	7	4	–	8
San Diego State	1	–	7	2	–	10
$ – Conference champion and BCS representative as top non-AQ school to meet automatic qualification criteria; Rankings from AP Poll

The 2008 UNLV Rebels football team represented the University of Nevada, Las Vegas (UNLV) as a member of the Mountain West Conference (MW) during the 2008 NCAA Division I FBS football season. Led by fourth-year head coach Mike Sanford Sr., the Rebels compiled an overall record of 5–7 record with mark of 2–6 in conference play, tying for sixth place in the MW. The team played home games at Sam Boyd Stadium in Whitney, Nevada.

UNLV won three of their four out-of-conference games, including overtime upsets of both of their opponents from Bowl Championship Series conferences: 15th-ranked Arizona State of the Pac-10, 23–20, and Iowa State of the Big 12, 34–31. The Rebels led Colorado State in the fourth quarter, 28–27, but the Rams scored with 0:09 left to play and then on the ensuing kickoff recovered a fumble and scored again. UNLV led Air Force in the fourth quarter, 28–20, but lost by one point after the Falcons scored a touchdown and made a field goal. The Rebels were tied at half and the end of the third quarter against 18th-ranked BYU. In the final period, UNLV took a 35–34 lead, but lost after yielding a touchdown with 1:46 remaining to play. Despite losing starting quarterback Omar Clayton to an injury, the Rebels still managed victories over New Mexico and Wyoming. UNLV entered the regular season finale with five wins and needed one more victory to attain bowl eligibility and, with it, very likely a bowl game invitation. The Rebels, however, surrendered 21 points in the fourth quarter against a "woeful" San Diego State team.

== Schedule ==
Date	Time	Opponent	Site	TV	Result	Attendance
August 30	7:00 p.m.	Utah State*	Sam Boyd Stadium; Whitney, NV		W 27–17	18,815
September 6	5:00 p.m.	at No. 22 Utah	Rice–Eccles Stadium; Salt Lake City, UT	mtn.	L 21–42	45,587
September 13	7:00 p.m.	at No. 15 Arizona State*	Sun Devil Stadium; Tempe, AZ	FSN	W 23–20 ^{OT}	59,852
September 20	6:00 p.m.	Iowa State*	Sam Boyd Stadium; Whitney, NV	mtn.	W 34–31 ^{OT}	25,567
September 27	7:00 p.m.	Nevada*	Sam Boyd Stadium; Whitney, NV (Fremont Cannon)	mtn.	L 27–49	33,078
October 4	11:00 a.m.	at Colorado State	Hughes Stadium; Fort Collins, CO	mtn.	L 28–41	19,703
October 18	7:00 p.m.	Air Force^{†}	Sam Boyd Stadium; Whitney, NV	mtn.	L 28–29	21,055
October 25	11:00 a.m.	at No. 18 BYU	LaVell Edwards Stadium; Provo, UT		L 35–42	64,081
November 1	5:00 p.m.	No. 12 Texas Christian	Sam Boyd Stadium; Whitney, NV		L 14–44	16,121
November 8	7:00 p.m.	New Mexico	Sam Boyd Stadium; Whitney, NV		W 27–20	13,154
November 13	6:00 p.m.	Wyoming	Sam Boyd Stadium; Whitney, NV	CBSCS	W 22–14	18,154
November 22	5:00 p.m.	at San Diego State	Qualcomm Stadium; San Diego, CA		L 21–42	17,846
*Non-conference game; ^{†}Homecoming; Rankings from AP Poll released prior to the game; All times are in Pacific time
