= Ryan Wolfe (American football) =

American college football player (born 1986)

No. 88
- Position: Wide receiver

Personal information
- Born: November 23, 1986 (age 39); Santa Clarita, California, U.S.
- Listed height: 6 ft 2 in (1.88 m)
- Listed weight: 210 lb (95 kg)

Career information
- College: UNLV (2005–2009)

Awards and highlights
- MW Freshman of the Year (2006); 3× First-team All-MW (2006, 2008, 2009)

Ryan Wolfe (born November 23, 1986) is an American former football wide receiver who played college football for the UNLV Rebels. He was signed as an undrafted free agent by the Atlanta Falcons of the National Football League (NFL), but he never appeared in a game.

== College career ==
Wolfe attended UNLV from 2005 to 2009. He recorded 283 receptions for 3,495 yards and 15 touchdowns.

== Professional career ==
Wolfe was signed as an undrafted free agent by the Atlanta Falcons on April 24, 2010.
