= 2012 Armed Forces Bowl =

American college football game

2012 Bell Helicopter Armed Forces Bowl
- Armed Forces Bowl logo
| Rice Owls | Air Force Falcons |
| (6-6) | (6-6) |
| C-USA | Mountain West |
| 33 | 14 |
| Head coach: David Bailiff | Head coach: Troy Calhoun |
| | 1 | 2 | 3 | 4 | Total |
|---|---|---|---|---|---|
| Rice | 7 | 0 | 7 | 19 | 33 |
| Air Force | 0 | 14 | 0 | 0 | 14 |
- Date: December 29, 2012
- Season: 2012
- Stadium: Amon G. Carter Stadium
- Location: Fort Worth, Texas
- Favorite: Pick
- Referee: Matt Loeffler (SEC)
- Attendance: 40,754
- Payout: US$1,200,000

United States TV coverage
- Network: ESPN
- Announcers: Beth Mowins (Play-by-Play); Joey Galloway (Analyst); Lewis Johnson (Sidelines)

The 2012 Bell Helicopter Armed Forces Bowl was a post-season American college football bowl game held on December 29, 2012, at Amon G. Carter Stadium on the campus of Texas Christian University (TCU) in Fort Worth, Texas in the United States. The tenth edition of the Armed Forces Bowl began at 10:45 a.m. CST and aired on ESPN. It featured the Rice Owls from Conference USA against the Air Force Falcons from the Mountain West Conference and was the final game of the 2012 NCAA Division I FBS football season for both teams. The Falcons accepted their invitation after earning a 6–5 record in their first eleven games of the season, while the Owls advanced to the game per C-USA's bowl contingency plan after earning a 6-6 record.

This also marked the bowl's return to Amon G. Carter Stadium after a two-year absence because of renovations to the stadium. For 2010 and 2011, the game was held at Gerald J. Ford Stadium in University Park on the campus of Southern Methodist University (SMU).

== Teams ==
This was the seventh meeting between these two teams. Air Force leads the all-time record 7-2. The last time they played prior to this meeting was in 1998, when both schools were in the Western Athletic Conference (then a 16-team conference, now a non-football conference).

=== Rice ===
In a program not particularly known for football success, the Owls' season had an inauspicious start (2-6). Despite being one loss away from postseason ineligibility, Rice rallied to end the regular season at 6-6. Per Conference USA's contingency plan, the Owls were assigned the Armed Forces Bowl.

This will be the Owls' first Armed Forces Bowl.

=== Air Force ===
The Falcons' season thus far has been one of struggle; despite losing to both the Army Black Knights and Navy Midshipmen, the Falcons still managed a respectable 5-2 record in the Mountain West Conference. After defeating the Hawaiʻi Warriors to bring their season record to 6–5, the Falcons accepted the third invitation of the 2012–13 NCAA Bowl season to the 2012 Armed Forces Bowl.

This will be the Falcons' fourth Armed Forces bowl; they had previously played in the 2007, 2008 and 2009 games against the California Golden Bears and twice against the Houston Cougars, respectively. Although the Falcons lost to the Golden Bears in 2007 and the Cougars in 2008, they would rally to beat the same Cougars in the 2009 game, compiling an overall Armed Forces Bowl record of 1-2.

== Game summary ==
=== Scoring summary ===
Scoring summary

| Quarter | Time | Drive | | | Team | Scoring information | Score | |
| Quarter | Time | Plays | Yards | TOP | Team | Scoring information | Rice | Air Force |
|---|---|---|---|---|---|---|---|---|
| 1 | 4:05 | 5 | 57 | 2:32 | Rice | Jordan Taylor 16-yard touchdown reception from Taylor McHargue, Chris Boswell kick good | 7 | 0 |
| 2 | 6:14 | 10 | 66 | 2:46 | AFA | Kale Pearson 9-yard touchdown run, Parker Herrington kick good | 7 | 7 |
| 2 | 2:36 | 9 | 35 | 2:32 | AFA | Wes Cobb 1-yard touchdown run, Parker Herrington kick good | 7 | 14 |
| 3 | 9:30 | 8 | 87 | 3:31 | Rice | Jordan Taylor 22-yard touchdown reception from Driphus Jackson, Chris Boswell kick good | 14 | 14 |
| 4 | 14:25 | 9 | 74 | 3:56 | Rice | Charles Ross 2-yard touchdown run, Chris Boswell kick good | 21 | 14 |
| 4 | 11:18 | 5 | 49 | 1:39 | Rice | 24-yard field goal by Chris Boswell | 24 | 14 |
| 4 | 4:31 | 12 | 63 | 4:56 | Rice | 25-yard field goal by Chris Boswell | 27 | 14 |
| 4 | 1:30 | 4 | 36 | 2:14 | Rice | Jordan Taylor 34-yard touchdown reception from Driphus Jackson, James Farrimond kick blocked | 33 | 14 |
| "TOP" = time of possession. For other American football terms, see Glossary of American football. | | | | | | | 33 | 14 |
