= 2012 Poinsettia Bowl =

College football match

2012 San Diego County Credit Union Poinsettia Bowl
BYU Cougars	San Diego State Aztecs
(7–5)	(9–3)
Independent	Mountain West
23	6
Head coach: Bronco Mendenhall	Head coach: Rocky Long
	1	2	3	4	Total
BYU	0	3	0	20	23
San Diego State	3	3	0	0	6
- Date: December 20, 2012
- Season: 2012
- Stadium: Qualcomm Stadium
- Location: San Diego, California
- MVP: Offense: Cody Hoffman BYU Wide Receiver; Defense: Kyle Van Noy BYU Linebacker
- Favorite: BYU by 2
- Referee: Tony Cannella (MAC)
- Attendance: 35,442
- Payout: US$500,000 per team

United States TV coverage
- Network: ESPN
- Announcers: Carter Blackburn (Play-by-play); Rod Gilmore (Analyst); Jemele Hill (Sidelines)

The 2012 San Diego County Credit Union Poinsettia Bowl is a post-season American college football bowl game held on December 20, 2012 at Qualcomm Stadium in San Diego, California in the United States. The eighth edition of the Poinsettia Bowl began at 5:00 p.m. PST and aired on ESPN. It featured the Mountain West Conference co-champion San Diego State Aztecs (whose regular home stadium is Qualcomm) against the BYU Cougars (which had been in the MW until 2011 before playing as an FBS independent), and was the final game of the 2012 NCAA Division I FBS football season for both teams. The Cougars accepted their invitation after earning a 6–4 record in their first ten games of the season (and would finish 7-5), while the Aztecs accepted their invitation after finishing with a 9-3 record in their season

== Teams ==
In 2009, the Poinsettia Bowl announced that it had extended its agreement to continue to feature the Mountain West's second bowl-eligible team until at least 2013. In addition, BYU has a three-year deal to play in the Poinsettia Bowl should they not qualify for a Bowl Championship Series game.

This was the thirty-sixth meeting between these two teams. BYU leads the all-time record 28-7-1. The last time they played was in 2010.

=== BYU ===
The Cougars' season followed a specific pattern for the first ten games, winning their first two games, losing their next two, winning their next two, losing their next two, and again winning their next two. After defeating the Idaho Vandals to bring their season record to 6–4, the Cougars accepted the second invitation of the 2012–13 NCAA Bowl season to the 2012 Poinsettia Bowl. BYU finished the regular season with a 7–5 record.

=== San Diego State ===
The Aztecs are on a seven-game winning streak, with their last loss coming from a game against Fresno State on September 29. After defeating the Wyoming Cowboys, the Aztecs accepted an invitation to the 2012 Poinsettia Bowl. San Diego State finished the regular season with a 9–3 record.

This will be the Aztecs' second Poinsettia Bowl, following the 2010 game where they defeated the Navy Midshipmen by a score of 35-14.

== Game summary ==
=== Scoring summary ===
Scoring summary

Quarter	Time	Drive			Team	Scoring information	Score	
Quarter	Time	Plays	Yards	TOP	Team	Scoring information	Brigham Young	San Diego St.
1	8:31	8	52	3:13	San Diego State	27-yard field goal by Chance Marden	0	3
2	10:46	10	61	5:14	San Diego State	23-yard field goal by Chance Marden	0	6
2	0:00	12	74	2:07	Brigham Young	23-yard field goal by Justin Sorensen	3	6
4	12:32				Brigham Young	Fumble recovery returned 3 yards for touchdown by Kyle Van Noy, Justin Sorensen kick good	10	6
4	12:15	1	14	:05	Brigham Young	Jamaal Williams 14-yard touchdown run, Justin Sorensen kick no good	16	6
4	6:09				Brigham Young	Interception returned 17 yards for touchdown by Kyle Van Noy, Justin Sorensen kick good	23	6
"TOP" = time of possession. For other American football terms, see Glossary of American football.							23	6

=== Statistics ===
Statistics	BYU	SDSU
First downs	17	13
Total offense, plays - yards	74-296	68-263
Rushes-yards (net)	30-52	39-119
Passing yards (net)	244	144
Passes, Comp-Att-Int	23-44 -3	12-29 - 3
Time of Possession	29:04	30:56

Passing
Rushing

Receiving
