= 2012 BYU Cougars football team =

American college football season

2012 BYU Cougars football

Poinsettia Bowl champion

Poinsettia Bowl, W 23–6 vs. San Diego State
- Conference: Independent
- Record: 8–5
- Head coach: Bronco Mendenhall (8th season)
- Offensive coordinator: Brandon Doman (2nd season)
- Offensive scheme: West Coast
- Base defense: 3–4
- Captains: David Foote; Riley Nelson; Brandon Ogletree
- Home stadium: LaVell Edwards Stadium

2012 NCAA Division I FBS independents football records
	Conf.			Overall
Team	W		L	W		L
BYU		–		8	–	5
Navy		–		8	–	5
Army		–		2	–	10
No. 4 Notre Dame %		–		0*	–	0
% – BCS at-large representative; *All wins and national championship appearance for Notre Dame (12–1) in the 2012 season were vacated; Rankings from AP Poll

The 2012 BYU Cougars football team represented Brigham Young University in the 2012 NCAA Division I FBS football season. The Cougars, led by head coach Bronco Mendenhall, played their home games at LaVell Edwards Stadium. This was the second year BYU competed as an independent. They finished the season 8–5. They were invited to the Poinsettia Bowl where they defeated San Diego State.

== Before the season ==
=== 2012 Recruits ===
As the home of the Cougars, BYUtv would sponsor their own National Letter of Intent Day signing day special. The special aired on Wednesday, February 1 at 7 p.m. MT and was rebroadcast that night at 10 p.m. MT and Thursday morning at 1 a.m. MT. Additionally a signing day press conference was broadcast on BYUtvsports.com live at 1:30 p.m. MT. The following athletes signed letters of intent to play for BYU in the coming seasons.

College recruiting (2012)
Name	Hometown	School	Height	Weight	Commit date
Philip Amone; LB	Orlando, FL	Dr. Phillips	6 ft 0 in (1.83 m)	230 lb (100 kg)	Jun 4, 2011
Philip Amone; LB	Recruit ratings: Scout: Rivals: (72)				
Dylan Collie; WR	El Dorado Hills, CA	Oak Ridge	5 ft 11 in (1.80 m)	175 lb (79 kg)	May 24, 2011
Dylan Collie; WR	Recruit ratings: Scout: Rivals: (70)				
Matt Hadley; DB	Connell, WA	Connell	5 ft 11 in (1.80 m)	190 lb (86 kg)	Oct 29, 2010
Matt Hadley; DB	Recruit ratings: Scout: Rivals: (74)				
Micah Hannemann; DB	Alpine, UT	Lone Peak	6 ft 1 in (1.85 m)	190 lb (86 kg)	Jun 30, 2011
Micah Hannemann; DB	Recruit ratings: Scout: Rivals: (72)				
Taysom Hill; QB	Pocatello, ID	Highland	6 ft 2 in (1.88 m)	210 lb (95 kg)	Feb 1, 2012
Taysom Hill; QB	Recruit ratings: Scout: Rivals: (75)				
Troy Hinds; LB	Kaysville, UT	Davis	6 ft 5 in (1.96 m)	235 lb (107 kg)	Aug 8, 2011
Troy Hinds; LB	Recruit ratings: Scout: Rivals: (79)				
Austin Hoyt; OL	Jackson, CA	Argonaut	6 ft 7 in (2.01 m)	265 lb (120 kg)	Jun 4, 2011
Austin Hoyt; OL	Recruit ratings: Scout: Rivals: (75)				
Marques Johnson; DL	Los Angeles	El Camino CC	6 ft 2 in (1.88 m)	310 lb (140 kg)	Feb 1, 2012
Marques Johnson; DL	Recruit ratings: Scout: Rivals: (JC)				
Theodore King; DL	San Jose, CA	Valley Christian	6 ft 3 in (1.91 m)	235 lb (107 kg)	Jan 30, 2012
Theodore King; DL	Recruit ratings: Scout: Rivals: (45)				
Jherremya Leuta-Douyere; LB	Garden Grove, CA	Servite	6 ft 1 in (1.85 m)	235 lb (107 kg)	Jun 30, 2011
Jherremya Leuta-Douyere; LB	Recruit ratings: Scout: Rivals: (74)				
Tanner Mangum; QB	Eagle, ID	Eagle	6 ft 3 in (1.91 m)	195 lb (88 kg)	Apr 7, 2011
Tanner Mangum; QB	Recruit ratings: Scout: Rivals: (80)				
Ammon Olsen; QB	Draper, UT	Southern Utah	6 ft 3 in (1.91 m)	198 lb (90 kg)	Feb 1, 2012
Ammon Olsen; QB	Recruit ratings: Scout: Rivals: (TR)				
Butch Pau'u; LB	Anaheim, CA	Servite	6 ft 0 in (1.83 m)	225 lb (102 kg)	Jun 30, 2011
Butch Pau'u; LB	Recruit ratings: Scout: Rivals: (79)				
Sawyer Powell; LB	Richland, WA	Richland	6 ft 2 in (1.88 m)	205 lb (93 kg)	Aug 14, 2011
Sawyer Powell; LB	Recruit ratings: Scout: Rivals: (75)				
Steven Richards; DL	Sandy, UT	Alta	6 ft 4 in (1.93 m)	240 lb (110 kg)	Jun 14, 2011
Steven Richards; DL	Recruit ratings: Scout: Rivals: (74)				
Rhett Sandlin; LB	Sandy, UT	Alta	6 ft 3 in (1.91 m)	225 lb (102 kg)	Oct 29, 2010
Rhett Sandlin; LB	Recruit ratings: Scout: Rivals: (73)				
Taumata Tofi; DL	Perris, CA	Perris	6 ft 3 in (1.91 m)	270 lb (120 kg)	Mar 2, 2012
Taumata Tofi; DL	Recruit ratings: No ratings found				
Josh Weeks; WR	Show Low, AZ	Show Low	6 ft 4 in (1.93 m)	200 lb (91 kg)	Dec 18, 2010
Josh Weeks; WR	Recruit ratings: Scout: Rivals: (78)				
Jamaal Williams; RB	Fontana, CA	Summit	6 ft 1 in (1.85 m)	193 lb (88 kg)	Jul 7, 2011
Jamaal Williams; RB	Recruit ratings: Scout: Rivals: (72)				
Overall recruit ranking: Scout: 60 Rivals: 61 ESPN: Not Ranked Top 25
Note: In many cases, Scout, Rivals, 247Sports, On3, and ESPN may conflict in their listings of height and weight.; In these cases, the average was taken. ESPN grades are on a 100-point scale.; Sources: "BYU 2012 Football Commitments". Rivals.; "2012 BYU Football Commits". Scout.; "2012 Player Commits". ESPN.; "Scout.com Team Recruiting Rankings". Scout.; "2012 Team Ranking". Rivals.com.

6 of the Cougar commitments (Amone, Hannemann, Hinds, Mangum, Richards, and Weeks) plan to serve full-time church missions for the Church of Jesus Christ of Latter-day Saints before joining the BYU team. 3 Cougars commitments (Hill, Johnson, and Olsen) were mid-year enrollees. Powell graduated High School in winter 2011 and was already taking classes at BYU, so there was no letter of intent for him to sign. He plans to grey-shirt before going on a church mission. With 6 other QB's on the roster, Mangum also chose to grey-shirt the 2012 season.

=== 2012 Return Missionary Commitments ===
BYU also announced a large list of return missionaries that would help bolster their roster this season. Commit dates in this section are dates in which it was announced these players would return to BYU, not when they actually first signed with BYU.

College recruiting (2012)
Name	Hometown	School	Height	Weight	Commit date
Terrence Alletto; OL	Parker, CO	Ponderosa	6 ft 3 in (1.91 m)	287 lb (130 kg)	Feb 1, 2012
Terrence Alletto; OL	Recruit ratings: Scout: Rivals: (80)				
Trevor Bateman; DB	Palm Desert, CA	Palm Desert	5 ft 9 in (1.75 m)	178 lb (81 kg)	Feb 1, 2012
Trevor Bateman; DB	Recruit ratings: Scout: Rivals: (74)				
Craig Bills; DB	Provo, UT	Timpview	6 ft 1 in (1.85 m)	209 lb (95 kg)	Feb 1, 2012
Craig Bills; DB	Recruit ratings: Scout: Rivals: (74)				
Tui Crichton; DL	Orem, UT	Timpview	6 ft 3 in (1.91 m)	357 lb (162 kg)	Feb 1, 2012
Tui Crichton; DL	Recruit ratings: Scout: Rivals: (74)				
Jacob Hannemann; DB	Highland, UT	Lone Peak	6 ft 1 in (1.85 m)	190 lb (86 kg)	Feb 1, 2012
Jacob Hannemann; DB	Recruit ratings: Scout: Rivals: (40)				
Bronson Kaufusi; DL	Provo, UT	Timpview	6 ft 6 in (1.98 m)	220 lb (100 kg)	Feb 1, 2012
Bronson Kaufusi; DL	Recruit ratings: Scout: Rivals: (80)				
Mitch Mathews; WR	Beaverton, OR	Southridge	6 ft 6 in (1.98 m)	202 lb (92 kg)	Feb 1, 2012
Mitch Mathews; WR	Recruit ratings: Scout: Rivals: (75)				
Remington Peck; DL	South Jordan, UT	Bingham	6 ft 4 in (1.93 m)	240 lb (110 kg)	Feb 1, 2012
Remington Peck; DL	Recruit ratings: Scout: Rivals: (74)				
Brett Thompson; WR	El Dorado Hills, CA	Oak Ridge	6 ft 3 in (1.91 m)	216 lb (98 kg)	Feb 1, 2012
Brett Thompson; WR	Recruit ratings: Scout: Rivals: (69)				
Russell Tialavea; DL	Oceanside, CA	Oceanside	6 ft 3 in (1.91 m)	266 lb (121 kg)	Feb 1, 2012
Russell Tialavea; DL	Recruit ratings: Scout: Rivals: (Committed before ESPN started giving scores)				
Fono Vialavea; OL	Bryan, TX	Bryan	6 ft 4 in (1.93 m)	340 lb (150 kg)	Feb 1, 2012
Fono Vialavea; OL	Recruit ratings: Scout: Rivals: (No Score)				
Brad Wilcox; OL	Edmond, OK	North	6 ft 7 in (2.01 m)	265 lb (120 kg)	Feb 1, 2012
Brad Wilcox; OL	Recruit ratings: Scout: Rivals: (77)				
Overall recruit ranking: Scout: 60 Rivals: 61 ESPN: Not Ranked Top 25
Note: In many cases, Scout, Rivals, 247Sports, On3, and ESPN may conflict in their listings of height and weight.; In these cases, the average was taken. ESPN grades are on a 100-point scale.; Sources: "BYU 2012 Football Commitments". Rivals.; "2012 BYU Football Commits". Scout.; "2012 Player Commits". ESPN.; "Scout.com Team Recruiting Rankings". Scout.; "2012 Team Ranking". Rivals.com.

=== 2012 Departures ===
The following Cougars graduated, transferred, or chose to serve two-year Church Missions after the 2011 season and didn't return to the team in 2012.

Name	Number	Pos.	Height	Weight	Year	Hometown	Notes
JJ Di Luigi	10	RB	5'9"	185	Senior	Santa Clarita, CA	Graduated
Bryan Kariya	33	RB	6'0"	217	Senior	Kaysville, UT	Graduated
Terence Brown	60	C	6'4"	318	Senior	Summerville, SC	Graduated; NFL Free agent signee with the Miami Dolphins
Marco Thorson	62	OG	6'6"	210	Senior	Ramona, CA	Graduated
Matt Reynolds	70	OT	6'6"	305	Senior	Provo, UT	Graduated; NFL Free agent signee with the Carolina Panthers
McKay Jacobson	06	WR	5'11"	199	Senior	Southlake, TX	Graduated; NFL Free agent signee with the Philadelphia Eagles
Matt Marshall	19	WR	5'10"	171	Senior	Salt Lake City, UT	Graduated
Spencer Hafoka	83	WR	6'0"	201	Senior	Kahuku, HI	Graduated
Matthew Edwards	89	TE	6'3"	214	Senior	Salt Lake City, UT	Graduated
Matt Putnam	41	DE	6'6"	271	Senior	Brigham City, UT	Graduated; Invited to NFL's Green Bay Packers minicamp
Ian Dulan	65	DT	6'1"	270	Senior	Hilo, HI	Graduated
Hebron Fangupo	91	DT	6'1"	331	Senior	Santa Ana, CA	Graduated; NFL Free agent signee with the Houston Texans
Simote Vea	93	DE	5'11"	270	Senior	Hau'ula, HI	Graduated
Jordan Pendleton	01	LB	6'3"	238	Senior	South Jordan, UT	Graduated
Aveni Leung-Wai	31	LB	6'1"	227	Senior	Aiea, HI	Graduated
Jameson Frazier	48	LB	6'2"	230	Senior	Draper, UT	Graduated; Invited to NFL's Philadelphia Eagles minicamp
Jadon Wagner	49	LB	6'4"	245	Senior	Lethbridge, Alberta	Graduated
Travis Uale	23	DB	6'2"	199	Senior	Hawaii Kai, HI	Graduated
Corby Eason	25	DB	5'8"	173	Senior	Columbus, GA	Graduated
Jake Heaps	09	QB	6'1"	200	Sophomore	Issaquah, WA	Transferred- University of Kansas
Ryan Folsom	30	RB	5'10"	195	Sophomore	Medford, OR	
Austin Heder	41	RB	6'1"	241	Freshman	Pleasant Grove, UT	LDS mission (returning in 2014)
Grant James	92	TE	6'5"	190	Freshman	Concord, CA	
Stehly Reden	90	TE	6'4"	254	Freshman	Valley Center, CA	LDS mission (returning in 2014)
Manu Mulitalo	66	OL	6'2"	340	Freshman	West Valley City, UT	LDS mission (returning in 2014)
Austin Nielsen	68	OL	6'0"	277	Junior	Glendale, CA	
Devon Smith		OL	6'2"	275	Freshman	Beaverton, OR	LDS mission (returning in 2014)
Carter Mees	15	DB	6'0"	190	Junior	St. George, UT	
Gavin Fowler	16	DB	5'11"	190	Freshman	Kaysville, UT	LDS mission (returning in 2014)
Logan Obering	17	DB	N/A	N/A	Freshman	Cedar City, UT	
Kori Gaines	19	DB	5'8"	162	Freshman	Loganville, GA	Transferred- College of the Canyons
Baker Pritchard	43	DL	6'3"	277	Freshman	South Jordan, UT	LDS mission (returning in 2014)
Graham Rowley	92	DL	6'4"	280	Sophomore	Waialua, HI	LDS mission (returning in 2014)
Travis Tuiloma	97	DL	6'2"	320	Freshman	Topeka, KS	LDS mission (returning in 2014)
Zach Newman	42	LB	6'3"	215	Freshman	Alpine, UT	LDS mission (returning in 2014)
Cody Monsen	52	LB	6'2"	215	Freshman	Brownwood, TX	
Va'a Niumatalolo	59	LB	6'1"	227	Freshman	Annapolis, MD	LDS mission (returning in 2014)
Josh Quezada	20	RB	5'11"	225	Junior	La Habra, CA	Transferred – Fresno State
Jordan Richardson	94	DL	6'4"	270	Junior	La Habra, CA	Injured- Will miss senior season with injury; Moved to a Student Assistant
Rhen Brown	87	WR	5'10"	178	Junior	Summerville, South Carolina	Will miss senior season with injury
Jray Galea'i	16	DB	6'0"	196	Junior	Laie, HI	Will miss senior season with injury; Moved to a Student Assistant
O'Neill Chambers	15	DB	6'2"	225	RS Senior	Harmony, FL	In bad standing with program and not allowed to practice; Transferred to University of Nebraska at Kearney

=== Spring Game ===
The BYU 2012 Spring game was held on March 24, 2012. Due to a high number of injuries in spring football, it was downgraded to a scrimmage. All the starters were benched. Each of the remaining 4 quarterbacks got 2 series to play against selected defensive players. The scrimmage would end in a scoreless fashion at 0–0. However Coach Bronco Mendenhall said the game accomplished what he wanted it to. He was able to find a set of players that would be beneficial to the team this fall as starters or backups.

=== Transfers ===
Controversy arose with the BYU football team in April 2012 when it was revealed that Michael Wadsworth, a defensive back, had requested a transfer from Hawaiʻi while on his church mission. The reason he gave stated he wanted to play closer to his home in Orem, Utah. Hawaiʻi denied his request and asked him to complete one more season. Despite appeals to the coach, Greg McMackin, and others higher up at the university, Wadsworth was denied his attempt to transfer. When Norm Chow became the new coach of the Warriors, he was contacted by the Wadsworth's about the possible transfer. Chow said Wadsworth could transfer to any school except BYU. Despite being a former offensive coordinator at BYU, Chow claimed it was his belief that BYU had an unfair recruiting advantage with missionaries. Bronco Mendenhall and the staff have made it clear that they don't contact any missionaries in the field for recruiting purposes, and they have not made any contact with the Wadsworth family. At this time Wadsworth plans on go to BYU in the fall, but he won't be able to play football with BYU or even talk to the coaches about possibly playing football with them until June 2013.

On May 2, BYU learned that Colorado State transfer Drew Reilly would come to BYU. Reilly was a starting safety for the Rams 2011 season. Reilly's reasons for transferring were solely to seek a better atmosphere for his LDS beliefs. As is required, Reilly will sit out the 2012 season, but he will become a full scholarship student at BYU in January 2013 and be able to participate in spring ball in April 2013.

=== Pre-season honors ===
1 BYU Cougar was selected as a 2012 All-American participant, and 16 BYU Cougars were selected to the Phil-Steele All-Independent team to begin 2012 (Cody Hoffman was selected for two different positions).

Name	Number	Pos.	Height	Weight	Year	Hometown	Notes
Braden Hansen	76	OG	6'3"	303	Senior	Sandy, UT	Phil-Steele 3rd Team All American
Riley Nelson	13	QB	6'0"	196	Senior	Logan, UT	Phil-Steele 1st Team All-Independent; 2012 Maxwell Award Pre-season watch list
Cody Hoffman	2	WR	6'4"	208	Junior	Crescent City, CA	Phil-Steele 1st Team All-Independent
Braden Hansen	76	OG	6'3"	303	Senior	Sandy, UT	Phil-Steele 1st Team All Independent; 2012 Outland Trophy Pre-season watch list
Braden Brown	75	OT	6'6"	301	Senior	Salt Lake City, UT	Phil-Steele 1st Team All Independent
Brandon Ogletree	44	LB	5'11"	228	Senior	McKinney, TX	Phil-Steele 1st Team All Independent
Kyle Van Noy	3	LB	6'3"	235	Junior	Reno, NV	Phil-Steele 1st Team All Independent; 2012 Bronko Nagurski Trophy Pre-season watch list
Preston Hadley	7	CB	6'0"	200	Senior	Pleasant Grove, UT	Phil-Steele 1st Team All Independent
Daniel Sorensen	9	S	6'2"	206	Junior	Colton, CA	Phil-Steele 1st Team All Independent
Justin Sorensen	37	PK	6'1"	232	Junior	South Jordan, UT	Phil-Steele 1st Team All Independent
Riley Stephenson	99	P	6'0"	196	Senior	St. George, UT	Phil-Steele 1st Team All Independent and Ray Guy Award Pre-season Watchlist
JD Falslev	12	PR	5'8"	184	Junior	Smithfield, UT	Phil-Steele 1st Team All Independent
Ross Apo	1	WR	6'3"	206	Sophomore	Arlington, TX	Phil-Steele 2nd Team All Independent
Marcus Mathews	80	TE	6'4"	208	Junior	Beaverton, OR	Phil-Steele 2nd Team All Independent
Houston Reynolds	1	C	6'2"	296	Junior	Provo, UT	Phil-Steele 2nd Team All Independent
Eathyn Manumaleuna	55	DL	6'2"	294	Senior	Anchorage, AK	Phil-Steele 2nd Team All Independent
Romney Fuga	98	DL	6'2"	321	Senior	Huntington Beach, CA	Phil-Steele 2nd Team All Independent
Uona Kaveinga	4	LB	5'11"	236	Senior	Hawthorne, CA	Phil-Steele 2nd Team All Independent
Cody Hoffman	2	KR	6'4"	208	Junior	Crescent City, CA	Phil-Steele 2nd Team All-Independent

== Media ==
=== 2012 Media Day ===
On the BYU Spring Football Special aired April 2, 2012, it was announced that BYUtv would provide coverage of the national media day, probably sometime in July. On May 7 it was announced that BYU Football National Media Day would take place on Wednesday, June 27, 2012 from the BYU Broadcasting Center.

For football Media Day Dave McCann, Bronco Mendenhall, Tom Holmoe, and Trevor Matich discussed what the Cougars goals were for the 2012 season during the State of the Program discussion. They also discussed the new playoff format that will begin in 2014.

One of the hot topics was the BYU-Utah rivalry and if 2012 would be the last year for this traditional rivalry. Both Holmoe and Mendenhall said they want the rivalry to continue and that it is up in the hands of Utah's board. However, they hoped that with Strength of Schedule being one of the factors in the new playoff system, it should provide extra incentive for Utah to want to continue the rivalry.

Another topic discussed was moving the Utah State- BYU game from conference weekend back to November. Mendenhall said he liked the idea of having a traditional rival as the final game, and with the improvements Gary Andersen continued to make at Utah State, it would be a desirable outcome if both schools could make it happen.

Finally the discussion of realignment and the BYU–Notre Dame alliance was discussed. Holmoe made it clear that Independence is the course that BYU will continue to take at this time, and they thanked Notre Dame football for providing a voice for BYU and Notre Dame in scheduling this new playoff format. He admitted BYU would keep an eye on the continuing changes of the college football landscape, but BYU and Notre Dame will continue to be partners in Independence for the foreseeable future.

The second program on Media Day was a True Blue 2012 Football Season Preview. Brandon Doman, Riley Nelson, Kyle Van Noy, and others were brought in to discuss what the coaches, offensive players, and defensive players are doing to get ready for the 2012 season. They also stated their goals. Bruce Binkowski, the Poinsettia Bowl and Holiday Bowl GM Association Executive Director, attended the show and discussed why the Poinsettia Bowl had signed BYU up for the 2012 season. He also revealed the ideal match for the 2012 Poinsettia Bowl would be BYU vs. San Diego State, a match-up which eventually came to fruition.

The third program held was a round table discussion. It focused on how Bronco Mendenhall has focused on changing the offense and defense at BYU since he became the head coach. John Beck, Curtis Brown, Vic So'oto, Max Hall, Austin Collie, and Dennis Pitta came back to discuss how playing at BYU has prepared them for the NFL, what their favorite moments were at BYU, and how Mendenhall changed the program into the 6th most winning program in NCAA Football during his 7 years at BYU.

Throughout the day Robbie Bullough also had live chats online with current BYU players and coaches.

=== BYU Radio Sports Network Affiliates ===
KSL 102.7 FM and 1160 AM- Flagship Station (Salt Lake City/ Provo, UT and ksl.com)
BYU Radio- Nationwide (Dish Network 980, Sirius XM 143, and byuradio.org)
KIDO- Boise, ID [football only]
KTHK- Blackfoot/ Idaho Falls/ Pocatello/ Rexburg, ID
KMGR- Manti, UT
KSUB- Cedar City, UT
KDXU- St. George, UT
KSHP- Las Vegas, NV [football only]

== Roster ==
2012 BYU Cougars football team roster
Players
Coaches
Offense

Pos.	#	Name	Class
QB	4	Taysom Hill (injured)	Fr
QB	7	Alex Kuersa	Fr
QB	3	James Lark	Sr
QB	11	Jason Munns	Jr
QB	13	Riley Nelson (C)	Sr
QB	15	Ammon Olsen	So
RB	42	Michael Alisa (injured)	Jr
RB	24	Brayden El-Bakri	Fr
RB	34	Bryan Engstrom	Fr
RB	27	David Foote (C)	Sr
RB	22	Adam Hine	Fr
RB	33	Paul Lasike	So
RB	35	Zed Mendenhall	Sr
RB	5	Iona Pritchard	So
RB	28	Levi Te'o	Fr
RB	21	Jamaal Williams	Fr
TE	93	Trevor Brown	Fr
TE	83	Mike Edmunds	Fr
TE	82	Kaneakua Friel	Jr
TE	88	Austin Holt	Jr
TE	84	Devin Mahina	So
TE	80	Marcus Mathews	Jr
TE	83	Stehly Reden	Fr
TE	89	Darin Tuttle	Fr
TE	18	Richard Wilson	Jr
WR	1	Ross Apo	So
WR	9	Dylan Collie	Fr
WR	85	Dallin Cutler	Jr
WR	12	JD Falslev	Jr
WR	25	Kurt Henderson	Fr
WR	2	Cody Hoffman	Jr
WR	11	Terenn Houk	Fr
WR	10	Mitch Mathews	Fr
WR	31	Cody Raymond	Fr
WR	29	Skyler Ridley	Jr
WR	23	Jordan Smith	Jr
WR	19	Brett Thompson	So
OL	70	Terrance Alletto	Fr
OL	56	Famika Anae (injured)	So
OL	75	Braden Brown	Sr
OL	94	Tui Crichton	Fr
OL	64	Quin Ficklin	Fr
OL	50	Ryan Freeman	Sr
OL	76	Braden Hansen	Sr
OL	66	Austin Hoyt	Fr
OL	67	Kyle Johnson	Fr
OL	73	Solomone Kafu	So
OL	71	Walter Kahaiali'i	Sr
OL	67	Quinn Lawlor	So
OL	72	Ryker Mathews	Fr
OL	78	Houston Reynolds (injured)	Jr
OL	74	Brock Stringham	So
OL	54	Blair Tushaus	So
OL	79	Manaaki Vaitai	Jr
OL	65	Fono Vakalahi	So
OL	68	Brad Wilcox	Fr
OL	77	Michael Yeck	So

Defense

Pos.	#	Name	Class
DB	18	Craig Bills (injured)	So
DB	26	Robbie Buckner	Sr
DB	24	Cameron Comer	So
DB	21	DeQuan Everett	Sr
DB	17	Matt Hadley	Fr
DB	7	Preston Hadley	Sr
DB	32	Mike Hague	Sr
DB	30	Micah Hannemann	Fr
DB	16	Adam Hogan	Jr
DB	6	Jordan Johnson	So
DB	23	Blake Morgan	Jr
DB	29	Skye PoVey	Jr
DB	28	Sawyer Powell	Fr
DB	36	Drew Reilly	So
DB	1	Joe Sampson (S)	Sr
DB	9	Daniel Sorensen	Jr
DB	18	Morgan Unga	Fr
DL	62	Roman Andrus	Fr
DL	58	Justin Blackmore	So
DL	57	Tyson Brook	Fr
DL	92	Michael Doman	Fr
DL	39	Ian Dulan	Sr
DL	98	Romney Fuga	Sr
DL	91	Marques Johnson	Jr
DL	90	Bronson Kaufusi	Fr
DL	97	Theodore King	Fr
DL	56	Jheremmya Leuta-Douyere	Fr
DL	55	Eathyn Manumaleuna (injured)	Sr
DL	95	Mike Muehlmann	Jr
DL	50	Remington Peck	Fr
DL	52	Russell Tialavea	Sr
DL	93	Simote Vea	Sr
LB	47	Ezekiel Ansah	Sr
LB	45	Tyler Beck	Jr
LB	46	Kevan Bills	Fr
LB	53	Tanner Cox	So
LB	5	Alani Fua	So
LB	2	Spencer Hadley	Jr
LB	34	Austen Jorgensen	Sr
LB	27	Teu Kautai	Fr
LB	4	Uona Kaveinga	Sr
LB	51	Lene Lesatele	Fr
LB	44	Brandon Ogeltree (C)	Sr
LB	38	Butch Pau'u	Fr
LB	22	Manoa Pikula	Fr
LB	48	Nate Sampson	So
LB	43	Rhett Sandlin	Fr
LB	10	Zac Stout (S)	So
LB	41	Uani 'Unga	Jr
LB	3	Kyle Van Noy	Jr

Special teams

Pos.	#	Name	Class
DS	96	Reed Hornung	Sr
PK	37	Justin Sorensen	Jr
PK, P	99	Riley Stephenson	Sr
P	28	Scott Arellano	So
KR	2	Cody Hoffman	Jr
KR	32	Mike Hague	Sr
PR	12	JD Falslev	Jr
H	3	James Lark	Sr

Head coach

- Bronco Mendenhall (Oregon State)
  Defensive coordinator

Coordinators/assistant coaches

- Brandon Doman (BYU)
  Offensive coordinator/quarterbacks
- Lance Reynolds (BYU)
  Asst. head coach/tight ends
- Ben Cahoon (BYU)
  Receivers
- Joe DuPaix (Southern Utah)
  Running backs/recruiting coordinator
- Nick Howell (Weber State)
  Secondary/special teams
- Steve Kaufusi (BYU)
  Defensive line
- Kelly Poppinga (BYU)
  Outside linebackers
- Paul Tidwell (Utah State)
  Inside linebackers
- Mark Weber (Idaho State)
  Offensive line
- Jay Omer (Auburn)
  Strength & conditioning
- Duane Busby (Arizona State)
  Director of football operations
- Patrick Hickman (Boise State)
  Football H. S. relations coordinator
- Max Hall (BYU)
  Offensive student assistant – mostly QB's
- Jray Galea'i (BYU)
  Student assistant
- Jordan Richardson (BYU)
  Student assistant

Legend

- (C) Team captain
- (S) Suspended
- (I) Ineligible
- Injured
- Redshirt

Roster

=== Depth chart ===
Defense

FS
Joe Sampson
Mike Hague
⋅

WLB	BLB	MLB	SLB
Kyle Van Noy	Brandon Ogletree	Uona Kaveinga	⋅
Jherremya Leuta-Douyere	Manoa Pikula	Zac Stout	⋅
⋅	⋅	⋅	⋅

KAT
Daniel Sorensen
Craig Bills
⋅

CB
Jordan Johnson
Skye PoVey
⋅

DE	NT	DE
Ian Dulan	Romney Fuga	Eathyn Manumaleuna
Russell Tialavea	Mike Muehlmann	Remington Peck
⋅	⋅	⋅

CB
Preston Hadley
Micah Hannemann
⋅

Offense

WR
Cody Hoffman
Marcus Mathews
⋅

LT	LG	C	RG	RT
Ryker Mathews	Braden Hansen	Blair Tushaus	Brock Stringham	Braden Brown
Michael Yeck	Ryan Freeman	Houston Reynolds	Famika Anae	Braden Hansen
⋅	⋅	⋅	⋅	⋅

TE
Kaneakua Friel
Austin Holt
Richard Wilson

WR
Ross Apo
Mitch Mathews
⋅

QB
Riley Nelson
Taysom Hill
James Lark

RB
Jamaal Williams
Paul Lasike
⋅

FB
Iona Pritchard
David Foote
⋅

Special teams
PK Justin Sorensen
PK Riley Stephenson
P Riley Stephenson
P Scott Arellano
KR
- JD Falslev
- Cody Hoffman
PR JD Falslev
LS Reed Hornung
H James Lark

== Rankings ==
Ranking movements Legend: ██ Increase in ranking ██ Decrease in ranking — = Not ranked RV = Received votes
	Week															
Poll	Pre	1	2	3	4	5	6	7	8	9	10	11	12	13	14	Final
AP	RV	RV	25	—	—	—	—	—	—	—	—	—	—	—	—	
Coaches	RV	RV	RV	RV	—	—	—	—	—	—	—	—	—	—	—	
Harris	Not released						—	—	—	—	—	—	—	—	—	Not released
BCS	Not released							—	—	—	—	—	—	—	—	Not released

== Schedule ==
Date	Time	Opponent	Rank	Site	TV	Result	Attendance
August 30	8:15 p.m.	Washington State		LaVell Edwards Stadium; Provo, UT	ESPN	W 30–6	57,045
September 8	1:00 p.m.	Weber State		LaVell Edwards Stadium; Provo, UT	BYUtv	W 45–13	60,314
September 15	8:00 p.m.	at Utah	No. 25	Rice-Eccles Stadium; Salt Lake City, UT (Holy War)	ESPN2	L 21–24	45,653
September 20	7:00 p.m.	at No. 24 Boise State		Bronco Stadium; Boise, ID	ESPN	L 6–7	36,864
September 28	6:00 p.m.	Hawaii		LaVell Edwards Stadium; Provo, UT	ESPN	W 47–0	62,022
October 5	8:15 p.m.	Utah State		LaVell Edwards Stadium; Provo, UT (The Old Wagon Wheel)	ESPN	W 6–3	63,086
October 13	1:30 p.m.	No. 10 Oregon State^{†}		LaVell Edwards Stadium; Provo, UT	ABC/ESPN3	L 24–42	63,489
October 20	1:30 p.m.	at No. 5 Notre Dame		Notre Dame Stadium; Notre Dame, IN	NBC	L 14–17	80,795
October 27	1:00 p.m.	at Georgia Tech		Bobby Dodd Stadium; Atlanta, GA	ROOT via ACC Regional Network/ESPN3	W 41–17	50,103
November 10	8:15 p.m.	Idaho		LaVell Edwards Stadium; Provo, UT (Senior Day)	ESPNU	W 52–13	61,009
November 17	8:30 p.m.	at San Jose State		Spartan Stadium; San Jose, CA	ESPN2	L 14–20	15,494
November 24	1:30 p.m.	at New Mexico State		Aggie Memorial Stadium; Las Cruces, NM	ESPN3	W 50–14	12,571
December 20	6:00 p.m.	at San Diego State		Qualcomm Stadium; San Diego, CA (Poinsettia Bowl)	ESPN	W 23–6	35,442
^{†}Homecoming; Rankings from AP Poll released prior to game; All times are in Mountain time

== Game summaries ==
=== Washington State ===
Washington State at BYU

Team	1	2	3	4	Total
WSU Cougars	0	6	0	0	6
• BYU Cougars	7	17	6	0	30

- Date: August 30
- Location: LaVell Edwards Stadium
  Provo, UT
- Game start: 8:25 p.m. MDT
- Elapsed time: 3:24
- Game attendance: 57,045
- Game weather: 72 °F (22 °C), Overcast, winds S at 8mph
- Referee: Jay Stricherz
- TV announcers (ESPN/BYUtv): Joe Tessitore, Matt Millen, and Shannon Spake (ESPN)
  Dave McCann, Blaine Fowler, and Robbie Bullough (BYUtv)

BYU alum Mike Leach returned to Provo with a football team for the first time since he got his bachelor's when Washington State came to Provo. Leach didn't play or coach football while at BYU, so it was his first time on the field at LaVell Edwards Stadium. It was the first of a two-year home-and-home series between the schools and the fourth time they had met overall. BYU led the series 2–1.

Scoring summary

Quarter	Time	Drive			Team	Scoring information	Score	
Quarter	Time	Plays	Yards	TOP	Team	Scoring information	Washington State	BYU
1	1:36	10	80	4:24	BYU	Skyler Ridley 7-yard touchdown reception from Riley Nelson, Riley Stephenson kick good	0	7
2	13:26	10	71	2:37	BYU	Kaneakua Friel 18-yard touchdown reception from Taysom Hill, Riley Stephenson kick good	0	14
2	10:42	10	57	2:39	Washington State	47-yard field goal by Andrew Furney	3	14
2	4:29	16	65	6:13	BYU	28-yard field goal by Riley Stephenson	3	17
2	1:43	4	46	1:12	BYU	Kaneakua Friel 25-yard touchdown reception from Riley Nelson, Riley Stephenson kick good	3	24
2	0:00	5	53	1:38	Washington State	40-yard field goal by Andrew Furney	6	24
3	11:52	4	6	1:12	BYU	21-yard field goal by Riley Stephenson	6	27
3	3:00	12	66	6:04	BYU	31-yard field goal by Riley Stephenson	6	30
"TOP" = time of possession. For other American football terms, see Glossary of American football.							6	30

After the game, Riley Nelson and Kaneakua Friel were announced as Co-Offensive FBS Independent Players of the Week. Riley Stephenson was announced as the Special Teams player of the Week. It was Nelson's fifth FBS Independent Player of the Week award while it was a first for both Stephenson and Friel. BYU's performance in the game led Mark Schlabach and Jesse Palmer to compare Riley Nelson with Tim Tebow while also announcing that BYU's defense was one of the most underrated groups in all of college football.

=== Weber State ===
Weber State at BYU

Team	1	2	3	4	Total
Wildcats	0	0	6	7	13
• Cougars	7	14	10	14	45

- Date: September 8
- Location: LaVell Edwards Stadium
  Provo, UT
- Game start: 1:05 p.m. MDT
- Elapsed time: 3:13
- Game attendance: 60,314
- Game weather: 74 °F (23 °C), Clear, winds SW at 6mph
- Referee: Cooper Castleberry
- TV announcers (BYUtv): Dave McCann, Blaine Fowler, and Robbie Bullough

For only the third time in the schools histories, BYU and Weber State will meet in a collegiate football game. The series has been rather lopsided in BYU's favor. In the first meeting in 1973 BYU won 45–14. In the second meeting in 1979 BYU again prevailed 48–3.

Scoring summary

Quarter	Time	Drive			Team	Scoring information	Score	
Quarter	Time	Plays	Yards	TOP	Team	Scoring information	Weber State	BYU
1	3:19	9	90	3:37	BYU	Cody Hoffman 37-yard touchdown reception from Riley Nelson, Riley Stephenson kick good	0	7
2	13:12	4	49	1:40	BYU	Taysom Hill 2-yard touchdown run, Riley Stephenson kick good	0	14
2	4:51	8	71	3:47	BYU	Michael Alisa 8-yard touchdown run, Riley Stephenson kick good	0	21
3	8:42	3	42	1:03	BYU	Kaneakua Friel 2-yard touchdown reception from James Lark, Riley Stephenson kick good	0	28
3	4:49	9	75	3:53	Weber State	Josh Booker 1-yard touchdown run, Shaun McClain kick blocked	6	28
3	0:12	11	50	4:37	BYU	33-yard field goal by Riley Stephenson	6	31
4	13:10	3	23	0:51	BYU	James Lark 6-yard touchdown run, Riley Stephenson kick good	6	38
4	3:34	7	66	2:23	BYU	Taysom Hill 1-yard touchdown run, Riley Stephenson kick good	6	45
4	00:50	7	77	2:38	Weber State	Kris Parham 1-yard touchdown run, Shaun McClain kick good	13	45
"TOP" = time of possession. For other American football terms, see Glossary of American football.							13	45

Thanks to an average of 53.2 yards per punt, BYU punter Riley Stephenson was named the FBS Independents Special Teams player of the week. Stephenson punted 5 times during the game with a long punt of 61 yards occurring.

=== Utah ===
#25 BYU at Utah

Team	1	2	3	4	Total
#25 Cougars	0	7	0	14	21
• Utes	7	0	17	0	24

- Date: September 15
- Location: Rice-Eccles Stadium
  Salt Lake City, UT
- Game start: 8:15 p.m. MDT
- Elapsed time: 3:45
- Game attendance: 45,653 (6th largest crowd at Rice-Eccles)
- Game weather: 77 °F (25 °C), Clear, winds NE at 9mph
- Referee: Greg Burks
- TV announcers (ESPN2): Mark Neely, Ray Bentley, and Paul Carcaterra

The sixth year of the Deseret First Duel returns to Salt Lake City for the 2012 football match-up between BYU and Utah. It's the 88th meeting between the two schools since Brigham Young Academy became BYU. Utah leads the series 52–31–4 and has a current two game winning streak. Utah has a 4–3 record against current coach Bronco Mendenhall. BYU will look to end Utah's winning streak at Rice-Eccles against the Cougs, as the Utes have won 2 straight and 4 of the last 5 at Rice-Eccles.

Scoring summary

Quarter	Time	Drive			Team	Scoring information	Score	
Quarter	Time	Plays	Yards	TOP	Team	Scoring information	BYU	Utah
1	9:12	2	17	0:46	Utah	Westlee Tonga 17-yard touchdown reception from Jon Hays, Coleman Peterson kick good	0	7
2	4:40	4	33	1:38	BYU	Cody Hoffman 10-yard touchdown reception from Riley Nelson, Riley Stephenson kick good	7	7
3	7:27	8	23	3:28	Utah	48-yard field goal by Coleman Peterson	7	10
3	1:58				Utah	Fumble recovery returned 47 yards for touchdown by Mo Lee, Coleman Peterson kick good	7	17
3	0:57	1	39	0:25	Utah	Josh Booker 39-yard touchdown reception from Jon Hays, Coleman Peterson kick good	7	24
4	13:43	8	75	2:14	BYU	Jamaal Williams 7-yard touchdown run, 2-point run/pass good/failed/incomplete	14	24
4	3:39	4	14	1:26	BYU	Kaneakua Friel 1-yard touchdown reception from Riley Nelson, Riley Stephenson kick good	21	24
"TOP" = time of possession. For other American football terms, see Glossary of American football.							21	24

=== #24 Boise State ===
BYU at #24 Boise State

Team	1	2	3	4	Total
Cougars	0	0	0	6	6
• #24 Broncos	0	0	7	0	7

- Date: September 20
- Location: Bronco Stadium
  Boise, ID
- Game start: 7:07 p.m. MDT
- Elapsed time: 2:57
- Game attendance: 36,864
- Game weather: 76 °F (24 °C), Smokey, winds WSW at 5mph
- Referee: Reggie Smith
- TV announcers (ESPN): Rece Davis, Jesse Palmer, David Pollack, and Samantha Steele

The Cougars and Broncos begin the first of a 12-year football series with this 2012 match. Boise State leads the all-time series 2–0, having won previous matches in 2003 and 2004.

Scoring summary

Quarter	Time	Drive			Team	Scoring information	Score	
Quarter	Time	Plays	Yards	TOP	Team	Scoring information	BYU	Boise State
3	13:24				Boise State	Interception returned 36 yards for touchdown by Michael Atkinson, Michael Frisina kick good	0	7
4	3:37	11	95	4:26	BYU	Taysom Hill 4-yard touchdown run, 2-point pass no good	6	7
"TOP" = time of possession. For other American football terms, see Glossary of American football.							6	7

Despite the loss, Stephenson was once again awarded the FBS Independents Special Teams Player of the Week award. Stephenson punted 6 times during the game, with an average of 47 yards per punt, but what was impressive were his consistent 50+ yard punts: 52, 55, 56, and 57. On four of the six punts, Boise State had to start the next possession inside their own 20 yard line.

=== Hawaii ===
Hawaii at BYU

Team	1	2	3	4	Total
Warriors	0	0	0	0	0
• Cougars	7	13	20	7	47

- Date: September 28
- Location: LaVell Edwards Stadium
  Provo, UT
- Game start: 6:05 p.m. MDT
- Elapsed time: 3:21
- Game attendance: 62,022
- Game weather: 80 °F (27 °C), Sunny, No Wind
- Referee: Scott Novak
- TV announcers (ESPN/BYUtv): Carter Blackburn, Rod Gilmore, and Jemele Hill (ESPN)
  Dave McCann, Blaine Fowler, and Robbie Bullough (BYUtv)

Hawaii returns to Provo for the first time since 2002 to continue their rivalry with BYU. It will be the 29th meeting overall, with BYU holding a 20–8 advantage. It will be the first time former BYU offensive coordinator Norm Chow faces his old school as a head coach.

Scoring summary

Quarter	Time	Drive			Team	Scoring information	Score	
Quarter	Time	Plays	Yards	TOP	Team	Scoring information	Hawaii	BYU
1	10:48	9	77	4:12	BYU	Jamaal Williams 1-yard touchdown run, Riley Stephenson kick good	0	7
2	14:52	7	80	2:27	BYU	Ross Apo 22-yard touchdown reception from Taysom Hill, Riley Stephenson kick good	0	14
2	6:16	3	87	1:14	BYU	Taysom Hill 68-yard touchdown run, Riley Stephenson kick blocked	0	20
3	13:38	2	2	0:36	BYU	Jamaal Williams 2-yard touchdown run, Riley Stephenson kick good	0	27
3	4:18	6	70	2:35	BYU	Devin Mahina 12-yard touchdown reception from Taysom Hill, Riley Stephenson kick good	0	34
3	0:00	6	23	3:03	BYU	Paul Lasike 4-yard touchdown run, Riley Stephenson kick missed left	0	40
4	6:58	11	72	5:58	BYU	Paul Lasike 1-yard touchdown run, Justin Sorenson kick good	0	47
"TOP" = time of possession. For other American football terms, see Glossary of American football.							0	47

The following Monday QB Taysom Hill was awarded the FBS Independent Offensive Player of the Week award and CB Preston Hadley was awarded the FBS Independent Defensive Player of the Week award.

=== Utah State ===
Utah State at BYU

Team	1	2	3	4	Total
Aggies	3	0	0	0	3
• Cougars	0	6	0	0	6

- Date: October 5
- Location: LaVell Edwards Stadium
  Provo, UT
- Game start: 8:26 p.m. MDT
- Elapsed time: 3:09
- Game attendance: 63,086
- Game weather: 54 °F (12 °C), Clear, winds Calm
- Referee: Clair Gausman
- TV announcers (ESPN/BYUtv): Carter Blackburn, Rod Gilmore, and Shelley Smith (ESPN)
  Dave McCann, Blaine Fowler, and Robbie Bullough (BYUtv)

BYU looks for their second straight win in the Battle for the Old Wagon Wheel as BYU and Utah State meet for the 82nd time. BYU owns a 44–34–3 record overall against Utah State and a 26–16–1 record in matches in Provo.

Scoring summary

Quarter	Time	Drive			Team	Scoring information	Score	
Quarter	Time	Plays	Yards	TOP	Team	Scoring information	Utah State	BYU
1	0:34	12	50	5:59	Utah State	26-yard field goal by Josh Thompson	3	0
2	0:03	4	61	0:25	BYU	JD Falslev 2-yard touchdown reception from Taysom Hill, Riley Stephenson kick no good	3	6
"TOP" = time of possession. For other American football terms, see Glossary of American football.							3	6

=== #10 Oregon State ===
#10 Oregon State at BYU

Team	1	2	3	4	Total
• #10 Beavers	14	0	7	21	42
Cougars	7	7	7	3	24

- Date: October 13
- Location: LaVell Edwards Stadium
  Provo, UT
- Game start: 1:35 p.m. MDT
- Elapsed time: 3:31
- Game attendance: 63,489
- Game weather: 54 °F (12 °C), Broken Clouds, winds variable
- Referee: Michael Batlan
- TV announcers (ABC/ESPN3/BYUtv): Mike Patrick, Ed Cunningham, and Jeannine Edwards (ABC/ESPN3)
  Dave McCann, Blaine Fowler, and Robbie Bullough (BYUtv)

Bronco Mendenhall meets his alma mater for the second consecutive season and the third time in four years as coach at BYU. The winner of the game will take the lead in the series all time, which is even at 5–5. BYU is 2–1 in meetings in Provo. BYU is looking for their fourth straight win over Oregon State having won games in 1986, 2009, and 2011.

Scoring summary

Quarter	Time	Drive			Team	Scoring information	Score	
Quarter	Time	Plays	Yards	TOP	Team	Scoring information	Oregon State	BYU
1	12:29	6	75	2:31	Oregon State	Markus Wheaton 11-yard touchdown reception from Cody Vaz, Trevor Romaine kick good	7	0
1	9:27	10	75	3:02	BYU	Jamaal Williams 1-yard touchdown run, Justin Sorensen kick good	7	7
1	3:01	2	67	0:28	Oregon State	Markus Wheaton 24-yard touchdown reception from Cody Vaz, Trevor Romaine kick good	14	7
2	1:36	12	30	4:15	BYU	Devin Mahina 2-yard touchdown reception from Riley Nelson, Justin Sorensen kick good	14	14
3	6:26	10	81	3:46	Oregon State	Storm Woods 16-yard touchdown run, Trevor Romaine kick good	21	14
3	2:50	9	75	3:36	BYU	Jamaal Williams 2-yard touchdown run, Justin Sorensen kick good	21	21
4	14:48	8	77	3:01	Oregon State	Colby Prince 5-yard touchdown reception from Cody Vaz, Trevor Romaine kick good	28	21
4	8:55	9	69	2:40	BYU	35-yard field goal by Justin Sorensen	28	24
4	5:30	5	77	3:25	Oregon State	Markus Wheaton 12-yard touchdown run, Trevor Romaine kick good	35	24
4	4:58				Oregon State	Interception returned 47 yards for touchdown by Jordan Poyer, Trevor Romaine kick good	42	24
"TOP" = time of possession. For other American football terms, see Glossary of American football.							42	24

=== #5 Notre Dame ===
BYU at #5 Notre Dame

Team	1	2	3	4	Total
Cougars	0	14	0	0	14
• #5 Fighting Irish	7	0	3	7	17

- Date: October 20
- Location: Notre Dame Stadium
  Notre Dame, IN
- Game start: 1:40 p.m. MDT
- Elapsed time: 3:05
- Game attendance: 80,795
- Game weather: 72 °F (22 °C), Partly Sunny and rainy, winds W at 14mph
- Referee: Jeff Maconaghy
- TV announcers (NBC): Tom Hammond, Mike Mayock, and Alex Flanagan

The first of 6 matches between the Cougars and Irish before 2020 begins what most people believe is BYU's hardest road stretch of the year. BYU looks to cut into the 4–2 record Notre Dame has against the Cougars.

Scoring summary

Quarter	Time	Drive			Team	Scoring information	Score	
Quarter	Time	Plays	Yards	TOP	Team	Scoring information	BYU	Notre Dame
1	1:30	5	64	2:34	Notre Dame	Tyler Eifert 4-yard touchdown reception from Tommy Rees, Kyle Brindza kick good	0	7
2	8:25	8	56	3:34	BYU	Cody Hoffman 6-yard touchdown reception from Riley Nelson, Justin Sorensen kick good	7	7
2	6:07	4	30	1:28	BYU	Kaneakua Friel 2-yard touchdown reception from Riley Nelson, Justin Sorensen kick good	14	7
3	2:25	6	65	3:21	Notre Dame	24-yard field goal by Kyle Brindza	14	10
4	12:52	8	73	3:34	Notre Dame	George Atkinson III 2-yard touchdown run, Kyle Brindza kick good	14	17
"TOP" = time of possession. For other American football terms, see Glossary of American football.							14	17

=== Georgia Tech ===
BYU at Georgia Tech

Team	1	2	3	4	Total
• Cougars	7	17	7	10	41
Yellow Jackets	7	7	3	0	17

- Date: October 27
- Location: Bobby Dodd Stadium
  Atlanta, GA
- Game start: 1:09 p.m. MDT
- Elapsed time: 2:58
- Game attendance: 50,103
- Game weather: 68 °F (20 °C), Partly Sunny, winds WNW at 12mph
- Referee: Mike Defee
- TV announcers (ACC Regional Network/ESPN3): Rich Waltz, Keith Jones, and Jenn Hildreth

The first game in a 4-game series against Georgia Tech (that is expected to be cut to two games) continues BYU's road stretch in ACC country. The two schools have met twice before, in a home-and-home series in 2002 and 2003, in which each school prevailed at home.

Scoring summary

Quarter	Time	Drive			Team	Scoring information	Score	
Quarter	Time	Plays	Yards	TOP	Team	Scoring information	BYU	Georgia Tech
1	9:36	12	55	5:15	BYU	Jamaal Williams 6-yard touchdown run, Justin Sorensen kick good	7	0
1	6:06				Georgia Tech	Interception returned 22 yards for touchdown by Isaiah Johnson, Justin Moore kick good	7	7
2	14:56	4	58	1:16	BYU	Jamaal Williams 1-yard touchdown run, Justin Sorensen kick good	14	7
2	4:46	2	21	0:46	BYU	Riley Nelson 10-yard touchdown run, Justin Sorensen kick good	21	7
2	4:31				Georgia Tech	Jamal Golden 97 yard kickoff return for a touchdown, Justin Moore kick good	21	14
2	0:30	10	42	3:52	BYU	26-yard field goal by Justin Sorensen	24	14
3	3:43	2	2	0:38	BYU	Jamaal Williams 1-yard touchdown run, Justin Sorensen kick good	31	14
3	0:21	9	70	3:16	Georgia Tech	20-yard field goal by Justin Moore	31	17
4	14:50	3	43	0:22	BYU	Jamaal Williams 39-yard touchdown reception from Riley Nelson, Justin Sorensen kick good	38	17
4	6:59	11	40	6:20	BYU	26-yard field goal by Justin Sorensen	41	17
"TOP" = time of possession. For other American football terms, see Glossary of American football.							41	17

=== Idaho ===
Idaho at BYU

Team	1	2	3	4	Total
Vandals	7	0	3	3	13
• Cougars	28	14	0	10	52

- Date: November 10
- Location: LaVell Edwards Stadium
  Provo, UT
- Game start: 8:22 p.m. MST
- Elapsed time: 3:13
- Game attendance: 61,009
- Game weather: 27 °F (−3 °C), Overcast w/ snow likely, winds NW at 1mph
- Referee: Tom Walker
- TV announcers (ESPNU/BYUtv): Joe Davis and Jay Walker (ESPNU)
  Dave McCann, Gary Sheide, and Robbie Bullough (BYUtv)

BYU finishes their home schedule with the first of 3 consecutive games against the Western Athletic Conference. BYU and Idaho meet for the fifth time with a 2–2 record against each other.

Scoring summary

Quarter	Time	Drive			Team	Scoring information	Score	
Quarter	Time	Plays	Yards	TOP	Team	Scoring information	Idaho	BYU
1	9:25	5	64	2:31	BYU	Cody Hoffman 6-yard touchdown reception from Riley Nelson, Justin Sorensen kick good	0	7
1	7:50	2	62	0:32	BYU	Jamaal Williams 9-yard touchdown run, Justin Sorensen kick good	0	14
1	4:08	7	55	2:47	BYU	Jamaal Williams 10-yard touchdown run, Justin Sorensen kick good	0	21
1	1:47	6	70	2:21	Idaho	Mike Scott 33-yard touchdown reception from Logan Bushnell, Troy Farquhar kick good	7	21
1	0:04				BYU	Fumble recovery returned 2 yards for touchdown by Spencer Hadley, Justin Sorensen kick good	7	28
2	11:04	7	33	2:34	BYU	Cody Hoffman 6-yard touchdown reception from Riley Nelson, Justin Sorensen kick good	7	35
2	6:49	7	58	2:48	BYU	Cody Hoffman 4-yard touchdown reception from Riley Nelson, Justin Sorensen kick good	7	42
3	8:28	6	48	1:46	Idaho	39-yard field goal by Trey Farquhar	10	42
4	12:00	8	42	3:10	BYU	Cody Raymond 2-yard touchdown reception from James Lark, Justin Sorensen kick good	10	49
4	1:50	13	74	6:08	BYU	21-yard field goal by Justin Sorensen	10	52
4	0:00	1	0	0:06	Idaho	35-yard field goal by Trey Farquhar	13	52
"TOP" = time of possession. For other American football terms, see Glossary of American football.							13	52

=== San Jose State ===
BYU at San Jose State

Team	1	2	3	4	Total
Cougars	7	0	0	7	14
• Spartans	13	7	0	0	20

- Date: November 17
- Location: Spartan Stadium
  San Jose, CA
- Game start: 8:41 p.m. MST
- Elapsed time: 3:11
- Game attendance: 15,494
- Game weather: 58 °F (14 °C), Partly Cloudy, winds SSE 9 mph
- Referee: Rick Lorniet
- TV announcers (ESPN2): Beth Mowins, Joey Galloway, and Kaylee Hartung

BYU begins their final road trip in San Jose to face off with the Spartans and try to cut down the deficit record they have against the Spartans all-time: 6–9.

Scoring summary

Quarter	Time	Drive			Team	Scoring information	Score	
Quarter	Time	Plays	Yards	TOP	Team	Scoring information	BYU	San Jose State
1	13:45	4	65	1:14	San Jose State	Noel Grigsby 51-yard touchdown reception from David Fales, Austin Lopez kick blocked	0	6
1	9:26	9	79	4:19	BYU	Jamaal Williams 16-yard touchdown run, Justin Sorensen kick good	7	6
1	5:04	9	75	4:22	San Jose State	Chandler Jones 9-yard touchdown reception from David Fales, Austin Lopez kick good	7	13
2	13:23	11	71	5:38	San Jose State	Noel Grigsby 18-yard touchdown reception from David Fales, Austin Lopez kick good	7	20
4	2:36	7	46	1:01	BYU	David Foote 20-yard touchdown reception from Riley Nelson, Justin Sorensen kick good	14	20
"TOP" = time of possession. For other American football terms, see Glossary of American football.							14	20

=== New Mexico State ===
BYU at New Mexico State

Team	1	2	3	4	Total
• Cougars	0	20	10	20	50
Aggies	0	7	7	0	14

- Date: November 24
- Location: Aggie Memorial Stadium
  Las Cruces, NM
- Game start: 1:34 p.m. MST
- Elapsed time: 3:10
- Game attendance: 12,571
- Game weather: 66 °F (19 °C), Clear, winds SSE 3 mph
- Referee: Cooper Castleberry
- TV announcers (ESPN3): Peter Young and John Fina

The Cougars end their regular season with their first trip to Las Cruces for a football game. The Cougars and Aggies meet for the second-straight year with the Cougars owning a 1–0 record in the all-time series.

Scoring summary

Quarter	Time	Drive			Team	Scoring information	Score	
Quarter	Time	Plays	Yards	TOP	Team	Scoring information	BYU	New Mexico State
2	12:55	12	78	5:13	New Mexico State	Perris Scoggins 8-yard touchdown reception from Andrew Manley, Marcus Johnson kick good	0	7
2	7:30	12	73	5:20	BYU	Cody Hoffman 5-yard touchdown reception from James Lark, Justin Sorensen kick Missed	6	7
2	2:44	7	36	3:05	BYU	JD Falslev 4-yard touchdown reception from James Lark, Justin Sorensen kick good	13	7
2	0:34	8	66	1:02	BYU	Cody Hoffman 2-yard touchdown reception from James Lark, Justin Sorensen kick good	20	7
3	11:05	13	66	3:48	BYU	31-yard field goal by Justin Sorensen	23	7
3	9:32	4	82	1:27	New Mexico State	Kemonte Bateman 67-yard touchdown reception from Andrew Manley, Marcus Johnson kick good	23	14
3	3:52	6	42	0:56	BYU	Cody Hoffman 31-yard touchdown reception from James Lark, Justin Sorensen kick good	30	14
4	12:35	12	40	4:43	BYU	Cody Hoffman 6-yard touchdown reception from James Lark, Justin Sorensen kick missed	36	14
4	9:09	1	64	0:13	BYU	Cody Hoffman 64-yard touchdown reception from James Lark, Justin Sorensen kick good	43	14
4	3:36	8	73	4:37	BYU	Zed Mendenhall 1-yard touchdown run, Justin Sorensen kick good	50	14
"TOP" = time of possession. For other American football terms, see Glossary of American football.							50	14

=== Poinsettia Bowl ===
BYU at San Diego State

Team	1	2	3	4	Total
• Cougars	0	3	0	20	23
Aztecs	3	3	0	0	6

- Date: December 20
- Location: Qualcomm Stadium
  San Diego, CA
- Game start: 6:01 p.m. MST
- Elapsed time: 3:19
- Game attendance: 35,442
- Game weather: 60 °F (16 °C), Clear and cool, winds WNW 8 mph
- Referee: Tony Cannella
- TV announcers (ESPN/ESPN Radio): Carter Blackburn, Rod Gilmore, and Jemele Hill (ESPN)
  Bill Rosinski, David Norrie, and Joe Schad (ESPN Radio)

Scoring summary

Quarter	Time	Drive			Team	Scoring information	Score	
Quarter	Time	Plays	Yards	TOP	Team	Scoring information	BYU	San Diego St.
1	8:31	8	52	3:13	San Diego State	27-yard field goal by Chance Marden	0	3
2	10:46	10	61	5:14	San Diego State	23-yard field goal by Chance Marden	0	6
2	0:00	12	74	2:07	BYU	23-yard field goal by Justin Sorensen	3	6
4	12:32				BYU	Fumble recovery returned 3 yards for touchdown by Kyle Van Noy, Justin Sorensen kick good	10	6
4	12:15	1	14	:05	BYU	Jamaal Williams 14-yard touchdown run, Justin Sorensen kick no good	16	6
4	6:09				BYU	Interception returned 17 yards for touchdown by Kyle Van Noy, Justin Sorensen kick good	23	6
"TOP" = time of possession. For other American football terms, see Glossary of American football.							6	23
