= 2012 San Diego State Aztecs football team =

American college football season

2012 San Diego State Aztecs football
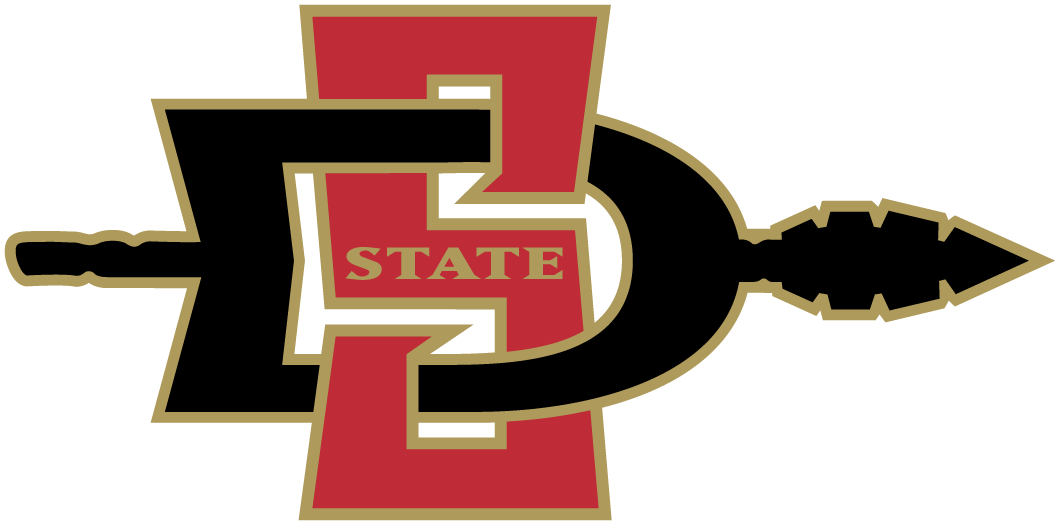

Mountain West co-champion

Poinsettia Bowl, L 6–23 vs BYU
- Conference: Mountain West Conference
- Record: 9–4 (7–1 MW)
- Head coach: Rocky Long (2nd season)
- Offensive coordinator: Andy Ludwig (2nd season)
- Offensive scheme: Pro-style
- Base defense: 3–3–5
- Home stadium: Qualcomm Stadium

2012 Mountain West Conference football standings
	Conf.			Overall
Team	W		L	W		L
No. 18 Boise State +	7	–	1	11	–	2
Fresno State +	7	–	1	9	–	4
San Diego State +	7	–	1	9	–	4
Air Force	5	–	3	6	–	7
Nevada	4	–	4	7	–	6
Wyoming	3	–	5	4	–	8
Colorado State	3	–	5	4	–	8
UNLV	2	–	6	2	–	11
New Mexico	1	–	7	4	–	9
Hawaii	1	–	7	3	–	9
+ – Conference co-champions; Rankings from AP Poll

The 2012 San Diego State Aztecs football team represented San Diego State University in the 2012 NCAA Division I FBS football season. The Aztecs were led by second-year head coach Rocky Long and played their home games at Qualcomm Stadium. This was San Diego State's 14th season in the Mountain West Conference.

== Schedule ==
Date	Time	Opponent	Site	TV	Result	Attendance
September 1	7:30 p.m.	at Washington*	CenturyLink Field; Seattle, WA	P12N	L 12–21	53,742
September 8	4:30 p.m.	Army*	Qualcomm Stadium; San Diego, CA	NBCSN	W 42–7	30,799
September 15	5:00 p.m.	North Dakota*	Qualcomm Stadium; San Diego, CA	KUSI	W 49–41	24,826
September 22	5:00 p.m.	San Jose State*	Qualcomm Stadium; San Diego, CA	KUSI	L 34–38	24,103
September 29	7:00 p.m.	at Fresno State	Bulldog Stadium; Fresno, CA (rivalry)	KUSI	L 40–52	33,894
October 6	5:00 p.m.	Hawaiʻi	Qualcomm Stadium; San Diego, CA	CBSSN	W 52–14	50,586
October 13	3:30 p.m.	Colorado State	Qualcomm Stadium; San Diego, CA	TWCSN, KTVD	W 38–14	27,133
October 20	7:30 p.m.	at Nevada	Mackay Stadium; Reno, NV	CBSSN	W 39–38 ^{OT}	22,242
October 27	5:00 p.m.	UNLV	Qualcomm Stadium; San Diego, CA	TWCSN	W 24–13	23,874
November 3	7:30 p.m.	at No. 19 Boise State	Bronco Stadium; Boise, ID	CBSSN	W 21–19	36,084
November 10	12:30 p.m.	Air Force	Qualcomm Stadium; San Diego, CA	NBCSN	W 28–9	30,266
November 24	12:30 p.m.	at Wyoming	War Memorial Stadium; Laramie, WY	TWCSN, ROOT	W 42–28	13,374
December 20	5:00 p.m.	BYU*	Qualcomm Stadium; San Diego, CA (Poinsettia Bowl)	ESPN	L 6–23	35,442
*Non-conference game; Rankings from AP Poll released prior to the game; All times are in Pacific time

== Game summaries ==
=== @ Washington ===
	1	2	3	4	Total
Aztecs	0	6	0	6	12
Huskies	14	0	7	0	21

=== Army ===
	1	2	3	4	Total
Black Knights	0	0	7	0	7
Aztecs	14	7	21	0	42

=== North Dakota ===
	1	2	3	4	Total
North Dakota	14	6	7	14	41
Aztecs	21	14	7	7	49

=== San Jose State ===
	1	2	3	4	Total
Spartans	3	14	0	21	38
Aztecs	0	17	7	10	34

=== @ Fresno State ===
	1	2	3	4	Total
Aztecs	21	6	13	0	40
Bulldogs	7	29	10	6	52

=== Hawaiʻi ===
	1	2	3	4	Total
Warriors	0	7	7	0	14
Aztecs	14	21	3	14	52

=== Colorado State ===
	1	2	3	4	Total
Rams	7	0	0	7	14
Aztecs	7	10	14	7	38

=== @ Nevada ===
	1	2	3	4	OT	Total
Aztecs	0	6	8	17	8	39
Wolf Pack	3	7	14	7	7	38

=== UNLV ===
	1	2	3	4	Total
Rebels	6	0	7	0	13
Aztecs	7	7	7	3	24

=== @ Boise State ===
	1	2	3	4	Total
Aztecs	7	0	7	7	21
#14 Broncos	6	7	0	6	19

=== Air Force ===
	1	2	3	4	Total
Falcons	3	0	6	0	9
Aztecs	7	7	14	0	28

=== @ Wyoming ===
	1	2	3	4	Total
Aztecs	7	14	14	7	42
Cowboys	7	21	0	0	28

=== BYU–Poinsettia Bowl ===
	1	2	3	4	Total
Cougars	0	3	0	20	23
Aztecs	3	3	0	0	6
