= 2012 Boise State Broncos football team =

American college football season

2012 Boise State Broncos football

Mountain West co-champion Maaco Bowl Las Vegas champion

Maaco Bowl Las Vegas, W 28–26 vs. Washington
- Conference: Mountain West Conference

Ranking
- Coaches: No. 14
- AP: No. 18
- Record: 11–2 (7–1 MW)
- Head coach: Chris Petersen (7th season)
- Offensive coordinator: Robert Prince (1st season)
- Offensive scheme: Multiple
- Defensive coordinator: Pete Kwiatkowski (3rd season)
- Base defense: 4–2–5
- Home stadium: Bronco Stadium

2012 Mountain West Conference football standings
| | Conf. | | | Overall |
| Team | W | | L | W | | L |
|---|---|---|---|---|---|---|
| No. 18 Boise State + | 7 | – | 1 | 11 | – | 2 |
| Fresno State + | 7 | – | 1 | 9 | – | 4 |
| San Diego State + | 7 | – | 1 | 9 | – | 4 |
| Air Force | 5 | – | 3 | 6 | – | 7 |
| Nevada | 4 | – | 4 | 7 | – | 6 |
| Wyoming | 3 | – | 5 | 4 | – | 8 |
| Colorado State | 3 | – | 5 | 4 | – | 8 |
| UNLV | 2 | – | 6 | 2 | – | 11 |
| New Mexico | 1 | – | 7 | 4 | – | 9 |
| Hawaii | 1 | – | 7 | 3 | – | 9 |
+ – Conference co-champions; Rankings from AP Poll

The 2012 Boise State Broncos football team represented Boise State University in the 2012 NCAA Division I FBS football season. The Broncos were led by head coach Chris Petersen and played their home games at Bronco Stadium. This season was Boise State's second in the Mountain West Conference. They finished the season 11–2, 7–1 in Mountain West play to share the conference championship with Fresno State and San Diego State. They were invited to and were champions of the Maaco Bowl Las Vegas for the third consecutive year, this year defeating Washington 28–26.

== Preseason ==
=== Award watch lists ===
Listed in the order that they were released.

Outland Trophy – Sr. G Joe Kellogg

Lombardi Award – Sr. G Joe Kellogg

Fred Biletnikoff Award – So. WR Matt Miller

Doak Walker Award – Sr. RB D.J. Harper

Lott Trophy – Sr. LB J.C. Percy

=== Mountain West media days ===
At the Mountain West media days, held at the Cosmopolitan in Las Vegas, Nevada, the Broncos were picked as the overwhelming favorites to win the conference title, receiving 27 of a possible 30 first place votes. This was the fifth straight year that Boise State was picked as the preseason champion of their conference. So. WR Matt Miller and Sr. OL Joe Kellog were selected to the all-conference first team offense. Sr. DL Mike Atkinson and Sr. DB Jamar Taylor were selected to the all-conference first team defense. Sr. WR Mitch Burroughs was selected as the returner of the year and as the special teams player of the year.

==== Media poll ====
1. Boise State – 296 (27)
2. Nevada – 244
3. Fresno State – 231 (2)
4. Wyoming – 213
5. San Diego State – 173 (1)
6. Air Force – 170
7. Hawaii – 116
8. Colorado State – 111
9. UNLV – 63
10. New Mexico – 33

=== Preseason polls ===
On August 2, Boise State was ranked #22 in preseason Coaches' poll. Their opening season opponent, Michigan State, debuted at #13. This will mark the fourth straight season that Boise State will start the season against a ranked opponent from a BCS conference (they won the previous three).

On August 18, Boise State was ranked #24 in the preseason AP poll.

== Schedule ==
| Date | Time | Opponent | Rank | Site | TV | Result | Attendance |
|---|---|---|---|---|---|---|---|
| August 31 | 6:00 p.m. | at No. 13 Michigan State* | No. 24 | Spartan Stadium; East Lansing, MI | ESPN | L 13–17 | 78,709 |
| September 15 | 2:00 p.m. | Miami (OH)* | | Bronco Stadium; Boise, ID | NBCSN | W 39–12 | 34,178 |
| September 20 | 7:00 p.m. | BYU* | No. 24 | Bronco Stadium; Boise, ID | ESPN | W 7–6 | 36,864^{A} |
| September 29 | 4:00 p.m. | at New Mexico | No. 24 | University Stadium; Albuequerque, NM | KTVB | W 32–29 | 28,270 |
| October 6 | 10:00 a.m. | at Southern Miss* | | M. M. Roberts Stadium; Hattiesburg, MS | FSN | W 40–14 | 25,337 |
| October 13 | 1:30 p.m. | Fresno State | No. 24 | Bronco Stadium; Boise, ID (Battle for the Milk Can) | NBCSN | W 20–10 | 35,742 |
| October 20 | 1:30 p.m. | UNLV | No. 24 | Bronco Stadium; Boise, ID | NBCSN | W 32–7 | 36,012 |
| October 27 | 1:30 p.m. | at Wyoming | No. 21 | War Memorial Stadium; Laramie, WY | CBSSN | W 45–14 | 17,855 |
| November 3 | 8:30 p.m. | San Diego State | No. 19 | Bronco Stadium; Boise, ID | CBSSN | L 19–21 | 36,084 |
| November 10 | 5:00 p.m. | at Hawaii | | Aloha Stadium; Honolulu, HI | NBCSN | W 49–14 | 29,471 |
| November 17 | 1:30 p.m. | Colorado State | | Bronco Stadium; Boise, ID | NBCSN | W 42–14 | 33,545 |
| December 1 | 1:30 p.m. | at Nevada | No. 25 | Mackay Stadium; Reno, NV (rivalry) | ABC | W 27–21 | 30,017 |
| December 22 | 1:30 p.m. | vs. Washington* | No. 20 | Sam Boyd Stadium; Whitney, NV (Maaco Bowl Las Vegas) | ESPN | W 28–26 | 33,217 |
*Non-conference game; Rankings from AP Poll released prior to the game; All times are in Mountain time

- ^A Denotes the largest crowd in Bronco Stadium history. Previous high was 34,196 vs Air Force in 2011. This record stood until October 12, 2019 (36,902).

== Game summaries ==
=== At Michigan State ===
| | 1 | 2 | 3 | 4 | Total |
|---|---|---|---|---|---|
| No. 22 Broncos | 3 | 10 | 0 | 0 | 13 |
| No. 13 Spartans | 10 | 0 | 0 | 7 | 17 |

Uniform Combination
| Helmet | Jersey | Pants |

=== Miami (OH) ===
| | 1 | 2 | 3 | 4 | Total |
|---|---|---|---|---|---|
| RedHawks | 0 | 9 | 0 | 3 | 12 |
| Broncos | 8 | 7 | 21 | 3 | 39 |

Uniform Combination
| Helmet | Jersey | Pants |

=== BYU ===
| | 1 | 2 | 3 | 4 | Total |
|---|---|---|---|---|---|
| Cougars | 0 | 0 | 0 | 6 | 6 |
| Broncos | 0 | 0 | 7 | 0 | 7 |

Uniform Combination
| Helmet | Jersey | Pants |

=== At New Mexico ===
| | 1 | 2 | 3 | 4 | Total |
|---|---|---|---|---|---|
| Broncos | 3 | 22 | 0 | 7 | 32 |
| Lobos | 0 | 0 | 14 | 15 | 29 |

Uniform Combination
| Helmet | Jersey | Pants |

=== At Southern Miss ===
| | 1 | 2 | 3 | 4 | Total |
|---|---|---|---|---|---|
| No. 25 Broncos | 7 | 16 | 7 | 10 | 40 |
| Golden Eagles | 0 | 0 | 7 | 7 | 14 |

Uniform Combination
| Helmet | Jersey | Pants |

=== Fresno State ===
| | 1 | 2 | 3 | 4 | Total |
|---|---|---|---|---|---|
| Bulldogs | 0 | 0 | 3 | 7 | 10 |
| No. 22 Broncos | 7 | 10 | 0 | 3 | 20 |

Uniform Combination
| Helmet | Jersey | Pants |

=== UNLV ===
| | 1 | 2 | 3 | 4 | Total |
|---|---|---|---|---|---|
| Rebels | 0 | 0 | 0 | 7 | 7 |
| No. 22 Broncos | 8 | 17 | 7 | 0 | 32 |

Uniform Combination
| Helmet | Jersey | Pants |

=== At Wyoming ===
| | 1 | 2 | 3 | 4 | Total |
|---|---|---|---|---|---|
| No. 18 Broncos | 7 | 10 | 21 | 7 | 45 |
| Cowboys | 0 | 7 | 0 | 7 | 14 |

Uniform Combination
| Helmet | Jersey | Pants |

=== San Diego State ===
| | 1 | 2 | 3 | 4 | Total |
|---|---|---|---|---|---|
| Aztecs | 7 | 0 | 7 | 7 | 21 |
| No. 14 Broncos | 6 | 7 | 0 | 6 | 19 |

Uniform Combination
| Helmet | Jersey | Pants |

=== At Hawaii ===
| | 1 | 2 | 3 | 4 | Total |
|---|---|---|---|---|---|
| No. 24 Broncos | 21 | 14 | 7 | 7 | 49 |
| Warriors | 7 | 0 | 0 | 7 | 14 |

Uniform Combination
| Helmet | Jersey | Pants |

=== Colorado State ===
| | 1 | 2 | 3 | 4 | Total |
|---|---|---|---|---|---|
| Rams | 0 | 0 | 7 | 7 | 14 |
| No. 22 Broncos | 14 | 21 | 7 | 0 | 42 |

Uniform Combination
| Helmet | Jersey | Pants |

=== At Nevada ===
| | 1 | 2 | 3 | 4 | Total |
|---|---|---|---|---|---|
| No. 15 Broncos | 7 | 10 | 7 | 3 | 27 |
| Wolf Pack | 0 | 0 | 7 | 14 | 21 |

Uniform Combination
| Helmet | Jersey | Pants |

=== Washington–Maaco Bowl Las Vegas ===
| | 1 | 2 | 3 | 4 | Total |
|---|---|---|---|---|---|
| Huskies | 3 | 14 | 6 | 3 | 26 |
| No. 15 Broncos | 9 | 9 | 7 | 3 | 28 |

Uniform Combination
| Helmet | Jersey | Pants |

== Rankings ==
Ranking movements Legend: ██ Increase in ranking ██ Decrease in ranking — = Not ranked RV = Received votes
| | Week | | | | | | | | | | | | | | | |
| Poll | Pre | 1 | 2 | 3 | 4 | 5 | 6 | 7 | 8 | 9 | 10 | 11 | 12 | 13 | 14 | Final |
|---|---|---|---|---|---|---|---|---|---|---|---|---|---|---|---|---|
| AP | 24 | RV | RV | 24 | 24 | RV | 24 | 24 | 21 | 19 | RV | RV | RV | 25 | 20 | 18 |
| Coaches | 22 | 25 | RV | RV | RV | 25 | 22 | 22 | 18 | 14 | 24 | 22 | 22 | 15 | 15 | 14 |
| Harris | Not released | | | | | | 22 | 23 | 19 | 17 | 23 | 23 | 21 | 17 | 15 | Not released |
| BCS | Not released | | | | | | | 22 | 21 | 19 | — | — | 22 | 20 | 19 | Not released |

== Statistics ==
=== Scores by quarter ===
| | 1 | 2 | 3 | 4 | Total |
|---|---|---|---|---|---|
| Boise State | 100 | 154 | 91 | 49 | 394 |
| Opponents | 27 | 30 | 51 | 97 | 205 |
