= 2012 Colorado State Rams football team =

American college football season

2012 Colorado State Rams football
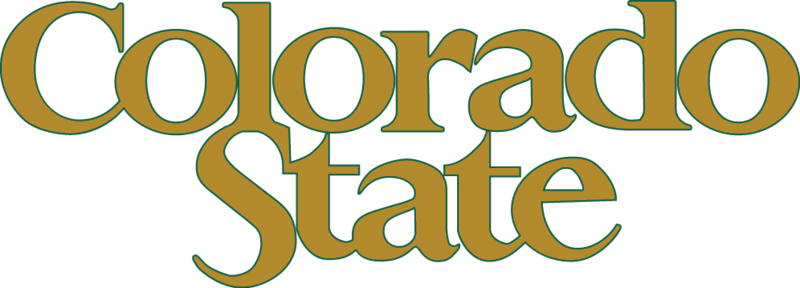
- Conference: Mountain West Conference
- Record: 4–8 (3–5 MW)
- Head coach: Jim McElwain (1st season)
- Offensive coordinator: Dave Baldwin (1st season)
- Offensive scheme: Multiple
- Co-defensive coordinators: Marty English (1st season); Al Simmons (1st season)
- Base defense: 4–3
- Home stadium: Sonny Lubick Field at Hughes Stadium

2012 Mountain West Conference football standings
	Conf.			Overall
Team	W		L	W		L
No. 18 Boise State +	7	–	1	11	–	2
Fresno State +	7	–	1	9	–	4
San Diego State +	7	–	1	9	–	4
Air Force	5	–	3	6	–	7
Nevada	4	–	4	7	–	6
Wyoming	3	–	5	4	–	8
Colorado State	3	–	5	4	–	8
UNLV	2	–	6	2	–	11
New Mexico	1	–	7	4	–	9
Hawaii	1	–	7	3	–	9
+ – Conference co-champions; Rankings from AP Poll

The 2012 Colorado State Rams football team represented Colorado State University in the 2012 NCAA Division I FBS football season. The Rams were led by first year head coach Jim McElwain and played their home games at Sonny Lubick Field at Hughes Stadium. They were members of the Mountain West Conference. They finished the season 4–8, 3–5 in Mountain West play to finish in a tie for sixth place.

== Schedule ==
Date	Time	Opponent	Site	TV	Result	Attendance	Source
September 1	2:00 p.m.	vs. Colorado*	Sports Authority Field at Mile High; Denver, CO (Rocky Mountain Showdown)	FX	W 22–17	58,607	
September 8	5:00 p.m.	No. 2 (FCS) North Dakota State*	Hughes Stadium; Fort Collins, CO	KTVD	L 7–22	23,567	
September 15	6:00 p.m.	at San Jose State*	Spartan Stadium; San Jose, CA	ESPN3	L 20–40	7,189	
September 22	5:00 p.m.	Utah State*	Hughes Stadium; Fort Collins, CO	KTVD	L 19–31	23,374	
September 29	12:00 p.m.	at Air Force	Falcon Stadium; Colorado Springs, CO (Ram–Falcon Trophy)	ALT	L 21–42	38,562	
October 6	5:00 p.m.	Fresno State	Hughes Stadium; Fort Collins, CO	KTVD/TWCSN	L 7–28	25,814	
October 13	5:00 p.m.	at San Diego State	Qualcomm Stadium; San Diego, CA	KTVD/TWCSN	L 14–38	27,133	
October 27	5:00 p.m.	Hawaiʻi	Hughes Stadium; Fort Collins, CO	KTVD/ROOT	W 42–27	16,573	
November 3	2:30 p.m.	at Wyoming	War Memorial Stadium; Laramie, WY (Border War)	KTVD	L 31–45	20,055	
November 10	5:00 p.m.	UNLV	Hughes Stadium; Fort Collins, CO	KTVD/ROOT/TWCSN	W 33–11	13,887	
November 17	1:30 p.m.	at Boise State	Bronco Stadium; Boise, ID	NBCSN	L 14–42	33,545	
November 24	5:00 p.m.	New Mexico	Hughes Stadium; Fort Collins, CO	ROOT	W 24–20	12,286	
*Non-conference game; Rankings from AP Poll released prior to the game; All times are in Mountain time

== Game summaries ==
=== vs Colorado ===
	1	2	3	4	Total
Rams	3	6	7	6	22
Buffaloes	0	14	0	3	17

=== North Dakota State ===
	1	2	3	4	Total
No. 2 (FCS) Bison	16	3	3	0	22
Rams	7	0	0	0	7

=== At San Jose State ===
	1	2	3	4	Total
Rams	0	13	0	7	20
Spartans	14	3	7	16	40

=== Utah State ===
	1	2	3	4	Total
Aggies	10	7	7	7	31
Rams	0	0	6	13	19

=== At Air Force ===
	1	2	3	4	Total
Rams	0	14	7	0	21
Falcons	21	14	7	0	42

=== Fresno State ===
	1	2	3	4	Total
Bulldogs	7	7	0	14	28
Rams	0	0	0	7	7

=== At San Diego State ===
	1	2	3	4	Total
Rams	7	0	0	7	14
Aztecs	7	10	14	7	38

=== Hawaii ===
	1	2	3	4	Total
Warriors	14	7	6	0	27
Rams	7	21	0	14	42

=== At Wyoming ===
	1	2	3	4	Total
Rams	7	7	3	14	31
Cowboys	21	7	14	3	45

=== UNLV ===
	1	2	3	4	Total
Rebels	0	0	0	11	11
Rams	7	17	3	6	33

=== At Boise State ===
	1	2	3	4	Total
Rams	0	0	7	7	14
No. 22 Broncos	14	21	7	0	42

=== New Mexico ===
	1	2	3	4	Total
Lobos	7	0	3	10	20
Rams	14	3	0	7	24
