= 2012 Air Force Falcons football team =

American college football season

2012 Air Force Falcons football

Armed Forces Bowl, L 14–33 vs. Rice
- Conference: Mountain West Conference
- Record: 6–7 (5–3 MW)
- Head coach: Troy Calhoun (6th season)
- Offensive coordinator: Clay Hendrix (6th season)
- Co-offensive coordinators: Blane Morgan (6th season); Mike Thiessen (4th season)
- Offensive scheme: Triple option
- Defensive coordinator: Charlton Warren (5th season)
- Co-defensive coordinator: Steve Russ (1st season)
- Base defense: Multiple 3–4
- Captain: Game captains
- Home stadium: Falcon Stadium

2012 Mountain West Conference football standings
	Conf.			Overall
Team	W		L	W		L
No. 18 Boise State +	7	–	1	11	–	2
Fresno State +	7	–	1	9	–	4
San Diego State +	7	–	1	9	–	4
Air Force	5	–	3	6	–	7
Nevada	4	–	4	7	–	6
Wyoming	3	–	5	4	–	8
Colorado State	3	–	5	4	–	8
UNLV	2	–	6	2	–	11
New Mexico	1	–	7	4	–	9
Hawaii	1	–	7	3	–	9
+ – Conference co-champions; Rankings from AP Poll

The 2012 Air Force Falcons football team represented the United States Air Force Academy as a member of the Mountain West Conference (MW) during the 2012 NCAA Division I FBS football season. Led by sixth-year head coach Troy Calhoun, the Falcons compiled an overall record of 6–7 with a mark of 5–3 in conference play, placing fourth in the MW. Air Force was invited to the Armed Forces Bowl, where the Falcons lost to Rice. The team played home games at Falcon Stadium in Colorado Springs, Colorado

== Schedule ==
Date	Time	Opponent	Site	TV	Result	Attendance
September 1	12:00 p.m.	Idaho State*	Falcon Stadium; Colorado Springs, CO		W 49–21	35,282
September 8	1:30 p.m.	at No. 19 Michigan*	Michigan Stadium; Ann Arbor, MI	ABC/ESPN2	L 25–31	112,522
September 22	8:00 p.m.	at UNLV	Sam Boyd Stadium; Whitney, NV	ALT	L 35–38	14,054
September 29	12:00 p.m.	Colorado State	Falcon Stadium; Colorado Springs, CO (rivalry)	ALT	W 42–21	38,562
October 6	9:30 a.m.	Navy*	Falcon Stadium; Colorado Springs, CO (Commander-in-Chief's Trophy)	CBS	L 21–28 ^{OT}	38,927
October 13	5:00 p.m.	at Wyoming	War Memorial Stadium; Laramie, WY	RTRM	W 28–27	22,627
October 20	5:00 p.m.	New Mexico	Falcon Stadium; Colorado Springs, CO	RTRM	W 28–23	29,726
October 26	6:00 p.m.	Nevada	Falcon Stadium; Colorado Springs, CO	CBSSN	W 48–31	24,277
November 3	10:00 a.m.	at Army*	Michie Stadium; West Point, NY (Commander-in-Chief's Trophy)	CBSSN	L 21–41	37,707
November 10	1:30 p.m.	at San Diego State	Qualcomm Stadium; San Diego, CA	NBCSN	L 9–28	30,266
November 16	7:30 p.m.	Hawaii	Falcon Stadium; Colorado Springs, CO (rivalry)	ESPN2	W 21–7	25,213
November 24	1:30 p.m.	at Fresno State	Bulldog Stadium; Fresno, CA	NBCSN	L 15–48	36,240
December 29	9:45 a.m.	vs. Rice*	Amon G. Carter Stadium; Fort Worth, TX (Armed Forces Bowl)	ESPN	L 14–33	40,754
*Non-conference game; Rankings from AP Poll released prior to the game; All times are in Mountain time

== Game summaries ==
=== Idaho State ===
	1	2	3	4	Total
Bengals	0	0	14	7	21
Falcons	7	21	14	7	49

=== At Michigan ===
	1	2	3	4	Total
Falcons	3	7	7	8	25
#19 Wolverines	7	7	14	3	31

=== At UNLV ===
	1	2	3	4	Total
Falcons	14	14	0	7	35
Rebels	7	10	14	7	38

=== Colorado State ===
	1	2	3	4	Total
Falcons	21	14	7	0	42
Rams	0	14	7	0	21

=== Navy ===
	1	2	3	4	OT	Total
Midshipmen	0	10	0	11	7	28
Falcons	7	0	7	7	0	21

=== At Wyoming ===
	1	2	3	4	Total
Falcons	7	7	7	7	28
Cowboys	6	18	3	0	27

=== New Mexico ===
	1	2	3	4	Total
Lobos	10	0	7	6	23
Falcons	7	7	7	7	28

=== Nevada ===
	1	2	3	4	Total
Wolf Pack	7	14	7	3	31
Falcons	10	21	7	10	48

=== At Army ===
	1	2	3	4	Total
Falcons	7	0	0	14	21
Black Knights	7	13	15	6	41

=== At San Diego State ===
	1	2	3	4	Total
Falcons	3	0	6	0	9
Aztecs	7	7	14	0	28

=== Hawaii ===
	1	2	3	4	Total
Warriors	7	0	0	0	7
Falcons	0	7	14	0	21

=== At Fresno State ===
	1	2	3	4	Total
Falcons	0	7	0	8	15
Bulldogs	21	10	14	3	48

=== Rice–Armed Forces Bowl ===
	1	2	3	4	Total
Owls	7	0	7	19	33
Falcons	0	14	0	0	14

== Roster ==
2012 Air Force Falcons football team roster
Players
Coaches
Offense

Pos.	#	Name	Class
QB	2	Kale Pearson	So
QB	7	Dano Graves	Fr
WR	8	Chris Jordan	Sr
QB	11	Connor Dietz	Sr
WR	14	Colton Huntsman	So
WR	16	Drew Coleman	Sr

Defense

Pos.	#	Name	Class
LB	2	Stephan Atrice	Sr
DB	3	Chris Miller	Jr
DB	5	Dexter Walker	Fr
LB	6	Connor Healy	Fr
DB	7	Miles Fisher	So
LB	9	Alex Means	Sr

Special teams

Pos.	#	Name	Class

Head coach

- Troy Calhoun

Coordinators/assistant coaches

- Ben Miller (STC/RB)

Legend

- (C) Team captain
- (S) Suspended
- (I) Ineligible
- Injured
- Redshirt

Roster
