= 2012 Army Black Knights football team =

American college football season

2012 Army Black Knights football
- Conference: Independent
- Record: 2–10
- Head coach: Rich Ellerson (4th season)
- Offensive coordinator: Ian Shields (4th season)
- Offensive scheme: Triple option
- Co-defensive coordinators: Payam Saadat (4th season); Chris Smeland (4th season)
- Base defense: Double Eagle Flex
- Captains: Nate Combs; Jarrett Mackey; Trent Steelman
- Home stadium: Michie Stadium

2012 NCAA Division I FBS independents football records
	Conf.			Overall
Team	W		L	W		L
BYU		–		8	–	5
Navy		–		8	–	5
Army		–		2	–	10
No. 4 Notre Dame %		–		0*	–	0
% – BCS at-large representative; *All wins and national championship appearance for Notre Dame (12–1) in the 2012 season were vacated; Rankings from AP Poll

The 2012 Army Black Knights football team represented the United States Military Academy as an independent in the 2012 NCAA Division I FBS football season. The Black Knights were led by fourth-year head coach Rich Ellerson and played their home games at Michie Stadium. They finished the season 2–10.

== Schedule ==
Date	Time	Opponent	Site	TV	Result	Attendance	Source
September 8	7:30 p.m.	at San Diego State	Qualcomm Stadium; San Diego, CA	NBCSN	L 7–42	30,799	
September 15	12:00 p.m.	Northern Illinois	Michie Stadium; West Point, NY	CBSSN	L 40–41	30,176	
September 22	12:30 p.m.	at Wake Forest	BB&T Field; Winston-Salem, NC	ACCN	L 37–49	30,207	
September 29	12:00 p.m.	No. 18 (FCS) Stony Brook	Michie Stadium; West Point, NY	CBSSN	L 3–23	31,006	
October 6	12:00 p.m.	Boston College	Michie Stadium; West Point, NY	CBSSN	W 34–31	39,492	
October 13	12:00 p.m.	Kent State	Michie Stadium; West Point, NY	CBSSN	L 17–31	30,022	
October 20	1:00 p.m.	at Eastern Michigan	Rynearson Stadium; Ypsilanti, MI	ESPN3	L 38–48	4,252	
October 27	12:00 p.m.	Ball State	Michie Stadium; West Point, NY	CBSSN	L 22–30	30,010	
November 3	12:00 p.m.	Air Force	Michie Stadium; West Point, NY (Commander-in-Chief's Trophy)	CBSSN	W 41–21	37,707	
November 10	12:00 p.m.	at Rutgers	High Point Solutions Stadium; Piscataway, NJ	ESPNU	L 7–28	43,250	
November 17	12:00 p.m.	Temple	Michie Stadium; West Point, NY	CBSSN	L 32–63	27,019	
December 8	3:00 p.m.	vs. Navy	Lincoln Financial Field; Philadelphia, PA (Army–Navy Game, Commander-in-Chief's Trophy)	CBS	L 13–17	69,607	
Rankings from The Sports Network Poll released prior to the game; All times are in Eastern time

== Game summaries ==
=== At San Diego State ===
Army Black Knights at San Diego State Aztecs

Quarter	1	2	3	4	Total
Black Knights	0	0	7	0	7
Aztecs	14	7	21	0	42

at Qualcomm Stadium, San Diego, California

- Date: September 8, 2012
- Game time: 4:30 p.m. PDT
- Game weather: Temperature: 82 F • Wind: NW 6 mph • Weather: Partly cloudy
- Game attendance: 30,799
- Referee: Daniel Romero
- TV announcers (NBCSN): Paul Burmeister (Play-by-play), Rod Woodson (color) & Anthony Herron (sideline)
- ESPN - San Diego St. 42, Army 7 /// Box Score, Army at San Diego State

Game information

First Quarter

- (12:10) SDSU TD: Walter Kazee 4-yard rush (Chance Marden kick); 6 plays, 71 yards, 2:50
- (02:17) SDSU TD: Adam Dingwell 7-yard rush (Chance Marden kick); 2 plays, 36 yards, 0:26

Second Quarter

- (08:10) SDSU TD: Walter Kazee 22-yard rush (Chance Marden kick); 7 plays, 80 yards, 3:05

Third Quarter

- (08:27) SDSU TD: Adam Muema 1-yard rush (Chance Marden kick); 9 plays, 89 yards, 3:39
- (07:44) SDSU TD: Chad Young 8-yard pass from Ryan Katz (Chance Marden kick); 2 plays, 33 yards, 0:31
- (05:54) ARMY TD: Terry Baggett 10-yard rush (Daniel Grochowski kick); 5 plays, 75 yards, 1:50
- (05:42) SDSU TD: Colin Lockett 96-yard kickoff return (Chance Marden kick)

Fourth Quarter

no scoring

Passing

- ARMY – Trent Steelman: 3/8, 50 yds, 2 INT
- SDSU – Ryan Katz: 14/21, 215 yds, 1 TD

Rushing

- ARMY – Raymond Maples: 19 att, 107 yds
- SDSU – Adam Muema: 15 att, 98 yds, 1 TD

Receiving

- ARMY – Raymond Maples: 1 rec, 23 yds
- SDSU – Ezell Ruffin: 5 rec, 132 yds

=== Northern Illinois ===
Northern Illinois Huskies at Army Black Knights

Quarter	1	2	3	4	Total
Huskies	14	14	0	13	41
Black Knights	7	12	15	6	40

at Michie Stadium, West Point, New York

- Date: September 15, 2012
- Game time: 12:00 p.m. EDT
- Game weather: Temperature: 67 F • Wind: NW 12 mph • Weather: Partly cloudy
- Game attendance: 30,176
- Referee: J. Magallanes
- TV announcers (CBSSN): Ben Holden (Play-by-play), Randy Cross (color) & Brad Strimel (sideline)
- ESPN - N. Illinois 41, Army 40 /// Box Score, Northern Illinois at Army

Game information

First Quarter

- (10:25) ARMY TD: Raymond Maples 22-yard rush (Daniel Grochowski kick); 10 plays, 75 yards, 4:35
- (07:22) NIU TD: Tim Semisch 2-yard pass from Jordan Lynch (Mathew Sims kick); 8 plays, 70 yards, 2:55
- (00:23) NIU TD: Jordan Lynch 88-yard rush (Mathew Sims kick); 4 plays, 98 yards, 1:19

Second Quarter

- (08:55) NIU TD: Tommylee Lewis 23-yard rush (Mathew Sims kick); 3 plays, 55 yards, 0:52
- (04:16) ARMY TD: Larry Dixon 3-yard rush (Daniel Grochowski kick failed); 10 plays, 73 yards, 4:29
- (03:40) NIU TD: Tommylee Lewis 69-yard pass from Jordan Lynch (Mathew Sims kick); 2 plays, 75 yards, 0:36
- (00:12) ARMY TD: Larry Dixon 13-yard rush (Raymond Maples rush failed); 13 plays, 77 yards, 3:22

Third Quarter

- (09:53) ARMY TD: Trent Steelman 25-yard rush (Daniel Grochowski kick); 8 plays, 68 yards, 3:47
- (02:23) ARMY TD: Larry Dixon 4-yard rush (Patrick Laird pass from Trent Steelman); 12 plays, 80 yards, 6:05

Fourth Quarter

- (13:25) NIU TD: Martel Moore 31-yard pass from Jordan Lynch (Mathew Sims kick); 5 plays, 50 yards, 1:05
- (08:55) ARMY TD: Trent Steelman 15-yard rush (Larry Dixon rush failed); 1 play, 15 yards, 0:06
- (04:29) NIU TD: Martel Moore 8-yard pass from Jordan Lynch (Jordan Lynch pass failed); 13 plays, 72 yards, 4:19

Passing

- NIU – Jordan Lynch: 18/27, 342 yds, 4 TD, 1 INT
- ARMY – Trent Steelman: 1/3, 8 yds

Rushing

- NIU – Jordan Lynch: 13 att, 125 yds, 1 TD
- ARMY – Raymond Maples: 23 att, 159 yds, 1 TD

Receiving

- NIU – Martel Moore: 7 rec, 134 yds, 2 TD
- ARMY – Scott Williams: 1 rec, 8 yds

=== At Wake Forest ===
Army Black Knights at Wake Forest Demon Deacons

Quarter	1	2	3	4	Total
Black Knights	13	10	14	0	37
Demon Deacons	14	7	21	7	49

at BB&T Field, Winston-Salem, North Carolina

- Date: September 22, 2012
- Game time: 12:30 p.m. EDT
- Game weather: Temperature: 77 F • Wind: SW 7 mph • Weather: Sunny
- Game attendance: 30,207
- Referee: Brad Allen
- TV announcers (ACCN): Steve Martin (Play-by-play), Dave Archer (color) & Mike Hogewood (sideline)
- ESPN - Wake racks up 517 total yards, outlasts Army /// Box Score, Army at Wake Forest

Game information

First Quarter

- (11:40) ARMY TD: Trent Steelman 2-yard rush (Daniel Grochowski kick blocked); 8 plays, 75 yards, 3:20
- (07:34) WF TD: Michael Campanaro 4-yard rush (Jimmy Newman kick); 9 plays, 82 yards, 4:00
- (04:23) ARMY TD: Larry Dixon 12-yard rush (Daniel Grochowski kick); 7 plays, 75 yards, 3:11
- (00:51) WF TD: Michael Campanaro 41-yard pass from Tanner Price (Jimmy Newman kick); 7 plays, 75 yards, 3:32

Second Quarter

- (11:41) ARMY TD: Trent Steelman 1-yard rush (Daniel Grochowski kick); 11 plays, 73 yards, 4:05
- (04:29) WF TD: Michael Campanaro 7-yard pass from Tanner Price (Jimmy Newman kick); 9 plays, 79 yards, 4:05
- (00:00) ARMY FG: Daniel Grochowski 21-yard field goal; 15 plays, 63 yards, 4:24

Third Quarter

- (12:05) WF TD: Josh Harris 19-yard rush (Jimmy Newman kick); 7 plays, 75 yards, 2:55
- (10:14) WF TD: Deandre Martin 10-yard rush (Jimmy Newman kick); 3 plays, 25 yards, 1:09
- (06:31) ARMY TD: Trent Steelman 2-yard rush (Daniel Grochowski kick); 9 plays, 75 yards, 3:43
- (05:19) WF TD: Josh Harris 63-yard rush (Jimmy Newman kick); 4 plays, 75 yards, 1:12
- (02:07) ARMY TD: Raymond Maples 13-yard pass from Trent Steelman (Daniel Grochowski kick); 9 plays, 75 yards, 3:12

Fourth Quarter

- (02:50) WF TD: Deandre Martin 37-yard rush (Jimmy Newman kick); 9 plays, 68 yards, 3:00

Passing

- ARMY – Trent Steelman: 3/4, 77 yds, 1 TD
- WF - Tanner Price: 15/24, 221 yds, 2 TD

Rushing

- ARMY – Raymond Maples: 15 att, 140 yds
- WF - Josh Harris: 12 att, 129 yds, 2 TD

Receiving

- ARMY – Chevaughn Lawrence: 1 rec, 45 yds
- WF - Michael Campanaro: 12 rec, 153 yds, 2 TD

=== Stony Brook ===
#18 (FCS) Stony Brook Seawolves at Army Black Knights

Quarter	1	2	3	4	Total
No. 18 (FCS) Seawolves	7	6	7	3	23
Black Knights	0	0	3	0	3

at Michie Stadium, West Point, New York

- Date: September 29, 2012
- Game time: 12:00 p.m. EDT
- Game weather: Temperature: 65 F • Wind: - • Weather: Cloudy
- Game attendance: 31,006
- Referee: Gary Patterson
- TV announcers (CBSSN): Ben Holden (Play-by-play), Randy Cross (color) & Cadet Linc Bradham (sideline)
- ESPN - Stony Brook 23, Army 3 /// Box Score, #18 (FCS) Stony Brook at Army

Game information

First Quarter

- (11:18) SBU TD: Miguel Maysonet 49-yard rush (Wesley Skiffington kick); 4 plays, 74 yards, 1:45

Second Quarter

- (12:44) SBU FG: Wesley Skiffington 27-yard field goal; 11 plays, 86 yards, 5:18
- (00:00) SBU FG: Wesley Skiffington 44-yard field goal; 12 plays, 63 yards, 4:52

Third Quarter

- (06:37) SBU TD: Miguel Maysonet 1-yard rush (Wesley Skiffington kick); 16 plays, 75 yards, 8:23
- (02:35) ARMY FG: Daniel Grochowski 39-yard field goal; 8 plays, 52 yards, 3:54

Fourth Quarter

- (12:16) SBU FG: Wesley Skiffington 25-yard field goal; 10 plays, 67 yards, 5:19

Passing

- SBU – Kyle Essington: 11/15, 151 yds
- ARMY – Trent Steelman: 4/9, 57 yds

Rushing

- SBU – Miguel Maysonet: 32 att, 220 yds, 2 TD
- ARMY – Trent Steelman: 17 att, 89 yds

Receiving

- SBU – Kevin Norrell: 7 rec, 95 yds
- ARMY – Patrick Laird: 2 rec, 40 yds

=== Boston College ===
	1	2	3	4	Total
Eagles	7	17	0	7	31
Black Knights	14	3	7	10	34

=== Kent State ===
	1	2	3	4	Total
Golden Flashes	0	14	10	7	31
Black Knights	0	0	3	14	17

=== At Eastern Michigan ===
	1	2	3	4	Total
Black Knights	10	7	7	14	38
Eagles	14	14	3	17	48

=== Ball State ===
	1	2	3	4	Total
Cardinals	14	3	3	10	30
Black Knights	7	3	3	9	22

=== Air Force ===
	1	2	3	4	Total
Falcons	7	0	0	14	21
Black Knights	7	13	15	6	41

=== At Rutgers ===
	1	2	3	4	Total
Black Knights	7	0	0	0	7
Scarlet Knights	0	7	0	21	28

=== Temple ===
	1	2	3	4	Total
Owls	14	14	14	21	63
Black Knights	0	10	14	8	32

=== Vs. Navy ===
	1	2	3	4	Total
Midshipmen	0	10	0	7	17
Black Knights	0	10	3	0	13

== Roster ==
- PK Eric Osteen
- QB Trent Steelman
