= 2012 Wyoming Cowboys football team =

American college football season

2012 Wyoming Cowboys football
- Conference: Mountain West Conference
- Record: 4–8 (3–5 MW)
- Head coach: Dave Christensen (4th season)
- Offensive coordinator: Gregg Brandon (2nd season)
- Offensive scheme: Spread
- Defensive coordinator: Chris Tormey (1st season)
- Base defense: 4–3
- Home stadium: War Memorial Stadium

2012 Mountain West Conference football standings
	Conf.			Overall
Team	W		L	W		L
No. 18 Boise State +	7	–	1	11	–	2
Fresno State +	7	–	1	9	–	4
San Diego State +	7	–	1	9	–	4
Air Force	5	–	3	6	–	7
Nevada	4	–	4	7	–	6
Wyoming	3	–	5	4	–	8
Colorado State	3	–	5	4	–	8
UNLV	2	–	6	2	–	11
New Mexico	1	–	7	4	–	9
Hawaii	1	–	7	3	–	9
+ – Conference co-champions; Rankings from AP Poll

The 2012 Wyoming Cowboys football team represented the University of Wyoming as a member Mountain West Conference (MW) during the 2012 NCAA Division I FBS football season. Led by fourth-year head coach Dave Christensen, the Cowboys compiled an overall record of 4–8 record with mark 3–5 in conference play, tying for sixth place in the MW. The team played home games at War Memorial Stadium in Laramie, Wyoming.

On October 13, Christensen confronted Air Force coach Troy Calhoun after the Cowboys' 28–27 loss to the Falcons. Believing Calhoun had told Air Force quarterback Connor Dietz to fake an injury in order to buy more time before the game-winning touchdown, Christensen launched a profanity-laced tirade at Calhoun, calling him a "fly boy." Christensen apologized the next night and was reprimanded by the Mountain West Conference for his actions. On October 22, Wyoming athletic director Tom Burman suspended Christensen for the Cowboys' game against Boise State and fined him $50,000. Assistant head coach Pete Kaligis coached the team in that game. However, Wyoming credits the entire season to Christensen.

== Schedule ==
Date	Time	Opponent	Site	TV	Result	Attendance
September 1	6:00 p.m.	at No. 15 Texas*	Darrell K Royal–Texas Memorial Stadium; Austin, TX	LHN	L 17–37	101,142
September 8	2:00 p.m.	Toledo*	War Memorial Stadium; Laramie, WY		L 31–34	21,688
September 15	4:00 p.m.	Cal Poly*	War Memorial Stadium; Laramie, WY		L 22–24	21,728
September 22	3:00 p.m.	at Idaho*	Kibbie Dome; Moscow, ID	ESPN3	W 40–37 ^{OT}	13,558
October 6	5:00 p.m.	at Nevada	Mackay Stadium; Reno, NV	Campus Insiders	L 28–35 ^{OT}	24,025
October 13	5:00 p.m.	Air Force	War Memorial Stadium; Laramie, WY	RSRM	L 27–28	22,627
October 20	8:30 p.m.	at Fresno State	Bulldog Stadium; Fresno, CA	RSRM, TWCSN	L 14–42	29,423
October 27	1:30 p.m.	No. 21 Boise State	War Memorial Stadium; Laramie, WY	CBSSN	L 14–45	17,855
November 3	2:30 p.m.	Colorado State	War Memorial Stadium; Laramie, WY (Border War)	KTVD	W 45–31	20,055
November 10	1:30 p.m.	at New Mexico	University Stadium; Albuquerque, NM		W 28–23	17,839
November 17	2:00 p.m.	at UNLV	Sam Boyd Stadium; Whitney, NV	TWCSN	W 28–23	10,717
November 24	1:30 p.m.	San Diego State	War Memorial Stadium; Laramie, WY	RSRM, TWCSN	L 28–42	13,374
*Non-conference game; Rankings from AP Poll released prior to the game; All times are in Mountain time

== Game summaries ==
=== @ Texas ===
	1	2	3	4	Total
Cowboys	9	0	0	8	17
#15 Longhorns	7	17	7	6	37

=== Toledo ===
	1	2	3	4	Total
Rockets	3	14	10	7	34
Cowboys	14	6	0	11	31

=== Cal Poly ===
	1	2	3	4	Total
Mustangs	14	0	7	3	24
Cowboys	0	15	0	7	22

=== @ Idaho ===
	1	2	3	4	OT	Total
Cowboys	14	0	6	14	6	40
Vandals	6	14	7	7	3	37

=== @ Nevada ===
	1	2	3	4	OT	Total
Cowboys	7	7	7	7	0	28
Wolf Pack	7	14	0	7	7	35

=== Air Force ===
	1	2	3	4	Total
Falcons	7	7	7	7	28
Cowboys	6	18	3	0	27

=== @ Fresno State ===
	1	2	3	4	Total
Cowboys	0	0	7	7	14
Bulldogs	21	14	0	7	42

=== Boise State ===
	1	2	3	4	Total
#21 Broncos	7	10	21	7	45
Cowboys	0	7	0	7	14

=== Colorado State ===
	1	2	3	4	Total
State Rams	7	7	3	14	31
Cowboys	21	7	14	3	45

=== @ New Mexico ===
	1	2	3	4	Total
Cowboys	0	21	0	7	28
Lobos	0	7	10	6	23

=== @ UNLV ===
	1	2	3	4	Total
Cowboys	14	14	0	0	28
Rebels	7	10	0	6	23

=== San Diego State ===
	1	2	3	4	Total
Aztecs	7	14	14	7	42
Cowboys	7	21	0	0	28
