= 2012 Navy Midshipmen football team =

American college football season

2012 Navy Midshipmen football
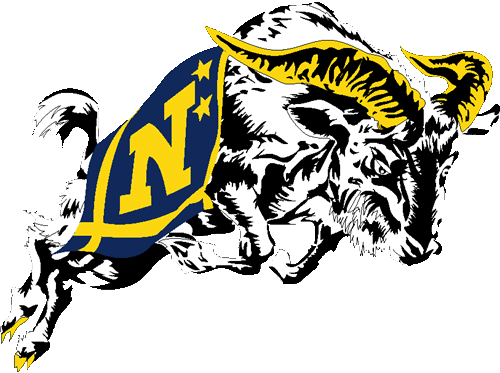

Kraft Fight Hunger Bowl, L 28–62 vs. Arizona State
- Conference: Independent
- Record: 8–5
- Head coach: Ken Niumatalolo (5th season)
- Offensive coordinator: Ivin Jasper (5th season)
- Offensive scheme: Triple option
- Defensive coordinator: Buddy Green (11th season)
- Base defense: Multiple
- MVP: Keenan Reynolds
- Captains: Brye French; Bo Snelson
- Home stadium: Navy–Marine Corps Memorial Stadium

2012 NCAA Division I FBS independents football records
	Conf.			Overall
Team	W		L	W		L
BYU		–		8	–	5
Navy		–		8	–	5
Army		–		2	–	10
No. 4 Notre Dame %		–		0*	–	0
% – BCS at-large representative; *All wins and national championship appearance for Notre Dame (12–1) in the 2012 season were vacated; Rankings from AP Poll

The 2012 Navy Midshipmen football team represented the United States Naval Academy as an independent in the 2012 NCAA Division I FBS football season. The Midshipmen were led by fifth-year head coach Ken Niumatalolo and played their home games at Navy–Marine Corps Memorial Stadium. They finished the season 8–5 and were invited to the Kraft Fight Hunger Bowl, where they were defeated by Arizona State.

== Schedule ==
Date	Time	Opponent	Site	TV	Result	Attendance
September 1	9:00 a.m.	vs. Notre Dame	Aviva Stadium; Dublin, Ireland (Emerald Isle Classic, rivalry)	CBS	L 10–50	48,820
September 15	3:30 p.m.	at Penn State	Beaver Stadium; University Park, PA	ABC/ESPN2	L 7–34	98,792
September 22	3:30 p.m.	VMI	Navy–Marine Corps Memorial Stadium; Annapolis, MD	CBSSN	W 41–3	35,671
September 29	3:30 p.m.	San Jose State	Navy–Marine Corps Memorial Stadium; Annapolis, MD	CBSSN	L 0–12	32,375
October 6	11:30 a.m.	at Air Force	Falcon Stadium; Colorado Springs, CO (Commander-in-Chief's Trophy)	CBS	W 28–21 ^{OT}	38,927
October 12	8:00 p.m.	at Central Michigan	Kelly/Shorts Stadium; Mount Pleasant, MI	ESPN2	W 31–13	15,074
October 20	3:30 p.m.	Indiana	Navy–Marine Corps Memorial Stadium; Annapolis, MD	CBSSN	W 31–30	33,441
October 27	1:00 p.m.	at East Carolina	Dowdy–Ficklen Stadium; Greenville, NC	FSN	W 56–28	48,327
November 3	3:30 p.m.	Florida Atlantic	Navy–Marine Corps Memorial Stadium; Annapolis, MD	CBSSN	W 24–17	29,362
November 10	3:30 p.m.	at Troy	Veterans Memorial Stadium; Troy, AL (College GameDay)	ESPN3	L 31–41	24,321
November 17	3:30 p.m.	Texas State	Navy–Marine Corps Memorial Stadium; Annapolis, MD	CBSSN	W 21–10	31,004
December 8	3:00 p.m.	vs. Army	Lincoln Financial Field; Philadelphia, PA (Army–Navy Game)	CBS	W 17–13	69,607
December 29	4:00 p.m.	vs. Arizona State	AT&T Park; San Francisco, CA (Kraft Fight Hunger Bowl)	ESPN2	L 28–62	34,172
All times are in Eastern time

== Game summaries ==
=== Notre Dame ===
Emerald Isle Classic

Team	1	2	3	4	Total
• #22 Notre Dame	13	14	13	10	50
Navy	0	3	7	0	10

- Date: September 1
- Location: Aviva Stadium, Dublin, Ireland
- Game start: 2:06 pm (9:06 am)
- Elapsed time: 3:19
- Game attendance: 48,820
- Game weather: Temp: 66 • Wind: WSW 19 • Weather: Mostly Cloudy
- Referee: John McDaid
- TV announcers (CBS): Verne Lundquist, Gary Danielson, Tracy Wolfson, & David Feherty

=== Penn State ===
Team	1	2	3	4	Total
Navy	0	0	0	7	7
• Penn St	14	6	7	7	34

- Date: September 15
- Location: Beaver Stadium, University Park, Pennsylvania
- Game start: 3:30 pm EST
- Elapsed time: 2:55
- Game attendance: 98,792
- Game weather: Temp: 66–70 • Wind: NW 10–16 • Weather: Sunny, Pleasant
- Referee: J. McGinn
- TV announcers (ABC): Brent Musburger, Kirk Herbstreit, & Heather Cox

=== VMI ===
Team	1	2	3	4	Total
VMI	3	0	0	0	3
• Navy	3	10	7	21	41

- Date: September 22
- Location: Navy–Marine Corps Memorial Stadium, Annapolis, Maryland
- Game start: 3:30 pm EST
- Elapsed time: 3:17
- Game attendance: 35,671
- Game weather: Temp: 82 • Wind: SW 10–20 • Weather: Partly Cloudy
- Referee: Tracy Jones
- TV announcers (CBS Sports Network): Grant Boone, Todd Christensen, & Sheehan Stanwick Burch

=== San Jose State ===
Team	1	2	3	4	Total
• San Jose St	0	3	3	6	12
Navy	0	0	0	0	0

- Date: September 29
- Location: Navy–Marine Corps Memorial Stadium, Annapolis, Maryland
- Game start: 3:30 pm EST
- Elapsed time: 2:57
- Game attendance: 32,375
- Game weather: Temp: 69 • Wind: W 7–12 • Weather: Partly Cloudy, Brisk
- Referee: Clair Gausman
- TV announcers (CBS Sports Network): Grant Boone, Todd Christensen, & Sheehan Stanwick Burch

=== Air Force ===
Team	1	2	3	4	OT	Total
• Navy	0	10	0	11	7	28
Air Force	7	0	7	7	0	21

- Date: October 6
- Location: Falcon Stadium, Colorado Springs, Colorado
- Game start: 11:30 am EST
- Elapsed time: 3:20
- Game attendance: 38,927
- Game weather: Temp: 31 • Wind: Calm • Weather: Mostly Sunny
- Referee: Jeff Maconaghy
- TV announcers (CBS): Spero Dedes, Steve Beuerlein, & Otis Livingston
- Source: ESPN

Scoring summary
1	13:31	AFA	Drew Coleman 35-yard pass from Connor Dietz (Parker Harrington kick)	AFA 7-0
2	14:55	NAVY	Nick Sloan 39-yard field goal	AFA 7-3
2	7:55	NAVY	Noah Copeland 5-yard run (Nick Sloan kick)	NAVY 10-7
3	0:37	AFA	Cody Getz 21-yard run (Parker Harrington kick)	AFA 14-10
4	9:38	NAVY	Nick Sloan 31-yard field goal	AFA 14-13
4	9:03	AFA	Drew Coleman 54-yard pass from Dontae Strickland (Parker Harrington kick)	AFA 21-13
4	6:35	NAVY	Keenan Reynolds 15-yard run (Noah Copeland run)	Tied 21-21
OT		NAVY	Jake Zuzek recovered fumble in end zone (Nick Sloan kick)	NAVY 28-21

=== Central Michigan ===
Team	1	2	3	4	Total
• Navy	14	3	14	0	31
Central Michigan	3	7	3	0	13

- Date: October 12
- Location: Kelly/Shorts Stadium, Mount Pleasant, Michigan
- Game start: 8pm EST
- Elapsed time: 2:52
- Game attendance: 15,074
- Game weather: Temp: 48 • Wind: None • Weather: Clear
- Referee: Dennis Hennigan
- TV announcers (ESPN2): Carter Blackburn, Rod Gilmore, & Jemele Hill

=== Indiana ===
Team	1	2	3	4	Total
Indiana	10	10	3	7	30
• Navy	0	14	7	10	31

- Date: October 20
- Location: Navy–Marine Corps Memorial Stadium, Annapolis, Maryland
- Game start: 3:30 pm EST
- Elapsed time: 3:20
- Game attendance: 33,441
- Game weather: Temp: 66 • Wind: W 10 • Weather: Partly Cloudy
- Referee: Alex Kemp
- TV announcers (CBS Sports Network): Grant Boone, Todd Christensen, & Sheehan Stanwick Burch

=== East Carolina ===
Team	1	2	3	4	Total
• Navy	14	7	21	14	56
East Carolina	0	14	0	14	28

- Date: October 27
- Location: Dowdy–Ficklen Stadium, Greenville, North Carolina
- Game start: 1pm EST
- Elapsed time: 3:20
- Game attendance: 48,327
- Game weather: Temp: 63 • Wind: NNE 13 • Weather: Cloudy
- Referee: Jeff Maconaghy
- TV announcers (FSN): Adam Alexander, Gary Reasons, & Lesley McCaslin

=== Florida Atlantic ===
Team	1	2	3	4	Total
Florida Atlantic	0	10	0	7	17
• Navy	0	14	10	0	24

- Date: November 3
- Location: Navy–Marine Corps Memorial Stadium, Annapolis, Maryland
- Game start: 3:30 pm EST
- Elapsed time: 3:11
- Game attendance: 29,362
- Game weather: Temp: 50 • Wind: NW 16–21 • Weather: Overcast
- Referee: Jeff Hilyer
- TV announcers (CBS Sports Network): Grant Boone, Todd Christensen, & Sheehan Stanwick Burch

=== Troy ===
Team	1	2	3	4	Total
Navy	0	21	7	3	31
• Troy	14	14	3	10	41

- Date: November 10
- Location: Veterans Memorial Stadium, Troy, Alabama
- Game start: 3:30 pm EST
- Elapsed time: 2:56
- Game attendance: 24,321
- Game weather: Temp: 72 • Wind: SE 6 • Weather: Sunny
- Referee: Todd LaPenta
- TV announcers (ESPN3): Dave Weekley & Forrest Conoly

=== Texas State ===
Team	1	2	3	4	Total
Texas St	0	0	3	7	10
• Navy	7	0	7	7	21

- Date: November 17
- Location: Navy–Marine Corps Memorial Stadium, Annapolis, Maryland
- Game start: 3:30 pm EST
- Elapsed time: 3:29
- Game attendance: 31,004
- Game weather: Temp: 50 • Wind: NE 9 • Weather: Mostly Sunny
- Referee: Stacy Hardin
- TV announcers (CBS Sports Network): Grant Boone, Todd Christensen, & Sheehan Stanwick Burch

=== Army ===
Army–Navy Game

Team	1	2	3	4	Total
• Navy	0	10	0	7	17
Army	0	10	3	0	13

- Date: December 8
- Location: Lincoln Financial Field, Philadelphia
- Game start: 3pm EST
- Elapsed time: 3:15
- Game attendance: 69,607
- Game weather: Temp: 48 • Wind: SSW 3 • Weather: Sun and Clouds Mixed
- Referee: Jeff Heaser
- TV announcers (CBS/Dial Global): Verne Lundquist, Gary Danielson, & Tracy Wolfson (CBS); John Tautges, Terry Donahue, & Lewis Johnson (Dial Global)

=== Kraft Fight Hunger Bowl: Arizona State ===
Team	1	2	3	4	Total
Navy	0	7	7	14	28
• Arizona State	21	13	28	0	62

- Date: December 29
- Location: AT&T Park, San Francisco, California
- Game start: 4pm EST
- Game attendance: 34,172
- TV announcers (ESPN2/Touchdown Radio): Dave Pasch, Brian Griese, & Jenn Brown (ESPN2); Roxy Bernstein and Gino Torretta (Touchdown Radio)

== Personnel ==
=== Roster ===
2012 Navy Midshipmen football team roster
Players
Coaches
Offense

Pos.	#	Name	Class
QB	1	Trey Miller	Jr
QB	2	Ralph Montalvo	Fr
SB	3	Bradley Bostick	Fr
SB	4	Bo Snelson (C)	Sr
QB	6	Thomas Wilson	Fr
QB	7	Greg Bryant	So
SB	8	Colin Osborne	Fr
QB	9	Kody Akers	So
QB	10	John Hendrick	So
WR	13	Hayden Maples	Jr
WR	14	Doug Ott	Fr
SB	16	Reuben Carson	So
QB	19	Keenan Reynolds	Fr
SB	20	Darius Staten	Jr
SB	21	Gee Gee Greene	Sr
SB	22	Brian Williams	Jr
SB	23	Demond Brown	Fr
SB	24	Ryan Williams-Jenkins	So
SB	26	Marcus Thomas	Jr
WR	28	Marc Meier	Fr
SB	29	Geoffrey Whiteside	Fr
SB	31	Marcus Lewis	So
FB	32	Quentin Ezell	Fr
SB	33	John Howell (injured)	Sr
FB	34	Noah Copeland	So
FB	35	Prentice Christian	Sr
FB	36	Quinton Singleton	So
FB	37	Chris Swain	Fr
WR	37	Devin Craytonpos	Fr
SB	40	Ed Royds	Fr
WR	42	Brantley Horton	Jr
SB	43	Jamaal Williams	Jr
SB	44	Zander Yost	Fr
SB	45	DeBrandon Sanders	Fr
WR	46	David Frechette	Fr
FB	47	Maika Polamalu	So
FB	48	Will Huntsman	Fr
WR	49	Bryson Garcia	Fr
WR	80	James King	So
WR	81	Brendan Dudeck	So
WR	82	Tyler Lynch	Sr
WR	83	John O'Boyle	Sr
WR	84	Matt Shibata	Sr
WR	85	Matt Aiken	Jr
WR	86	Brandon Turner	Sr
WR	87	Shawn Lynch	Jr
WR	88	Casey Bolena	Jr
WR	89	Jonathan Gazaille	Sr

Defense

Pos.	#	Name	Class
CB	1	Edward Robinson	Fr
CB	2	Parrish Gaines	So
S	3	James Britton	So
CB	4	Eric Johnson	So
CB	5	Quincy Adams	Fr
CB	6	Eric Graham	Jr
S	7	Shelley White	Fr
S	8	Wave Ryder	Jr
S	9	Tra'ves Bush	Sr
S	11	Mike Markovsky	Fr
OLB	13	Jordan Drake	So
CB	14	Albrey Felder	Jr
CB	15	Cody West	So
CB	16	Jerad Fehr	Sr
S	17	Roddy Reyna	Fr
CB	18	Lonnie Richardson	So
CB	19	Brandon Boyd	Fr
S	20	Lorentez Barbour	Fr
LB	21	Tyler Goble	Fr
CB	22	Myer Krah	Fr
S	23	Chris Ferguson	So
S	24	Kwazel Bertrand	Fr
CB	25	Jonathan Wev	Jr
LB	26	Don Pearson	Fr
LB	28	Anthony Lewis	So
OLB	29	Jude Merkel	Fr
LB	31	Vinnie Mauro	Jr
LB	32	Tyler Lehrke	Fr
OLB	33	Nick Martinez	Fr
OLB	34	Kikau Pescaia	Fr
OLB	35	Marcus Mack	Fr
CB	36	Jordan Sartor	Fr
LB	38	Matt Brewer	Sr
S	39	Shakir Robinson	So
LB	40	John Michael Nurthen	Sr
OLB	41	Josh Tate	So
S	42	George Jamison	So
DE	43	Michael Huf	Jr
OLB	44	Obi Uzoma	So
OLB	45	Paul Quessenberry	So
OLB	46	Chris Johnson	So
OLB	48	Keegan Wetzel	Sr
OLB	49	Collin Sturdivant	Sr
OLB	50	Brye French (C)	Sr
ILB	51	Matt Warrick	Sr
G	51	Austin Marshall	So
OLB	52	D.J. Sargenti	Jr
G	52	Zach Laniewski	Fr
OT	53	Bradford Mills	Fr
LB	53	Cody Peterson	Jr
LB	54	Sam Womack	Jr
OLB	54	A.K. Akpunku	Fr
LB	55	Michael Tuimavave	Jr
C	55	Blaze Ryder	Fr
OT	56	Joey Gaston	Fr
LB	56	Joe Worth	So
G	57	E.K. Binns	Fr
OLB	57	Carrington Lewis	So
C	58	Brandon Greene	Fr
DE	58	Evan Palelei	Jr
DE	59	Josh Dowling-Fitzpatrick	So
OT	59	Will Strauss	Jr
DE	60	Rex Montes	Fr
C	60	Kahikolu Pescaia	Sr
OT	61	Evan Campbell	Sr
C	62	Bradyn Heap	So
DE	63	Peter Igras	Fr
G	63	Matt Couch	Sr
DE	64	Sean Reaver	Fr
G	64	Jake Zuzek	So
G	65	Josh Cabral	Sr
DE	65	Sean Kamela	Fr
OT	66	Collin Watkins	Sr
OT	67	Nathaniel Otto	So
DE	67	Will Anthony	Fr
OT	68	Ryan Paulson	Sr
G	69	Kyle Cregge	So
NG	69	Barry Dabney	Jr
OT	70	Graham Vickers	Jr
G	71	Thomas Stone	Jr
G	72	Blake Benjamin	Fr
NG	72	Travis Bridges	Jr
G	73	Joe Ryan	Sr
DE	73	David Gordeuk	Fr
G	74	Eric Mahler	Jr
C	75	Tanner Fleming	So
LB	75	Trevor Smyth	Fr
OT	76	Adam Geuss	Jr
G	77	Beau Haworth	Sr
NG	77	Bernard Sarra	Fr
OT	78	Andrew Barker	Sr
OT	79	Matthew Van Halanger	Jr
LB	84	David Thurston	So
LB	85	Nick McCrory	Fr
LB	86	Zach Hester	Fr
NG	89	Vin Rider	So
DE	90	Ike McElrath	So
DE	91	Aaron Davis	So
DE	92	Chris Nurthen	So
DE	94	Daniel Godkin	So
G	94	Greg Eason	Fr
NG	95	Alex Doolittle	Jr
NG	96	Brice Musgrove	So
DE	97	Danny Ring	So
NG	98	A.J. Barnaby	So
DE	99	Wes Henderson	Sr

Special teams

Pos.	#	Name	Class
K	5	Stephen Picchini	Jr
P	11	Pablo Beltran	So
K	17	Brynmor Hughes	Jr
K	18	Colin Amerau	So
K	19	Austin Grebe	Fr
P	25	Justin Haan	Jr
K	90	Nick Sloan	Fr
LS	93	Joe Cardona	So
P	95	Gavin Jernigan	Fr
K	99	David Reisner	Fr

Head coach

- Ken Niumatalolo

Coordinators/assistant coaches

- Chris Culton – Offensive line
- Justin Davis – Outside linebackers
- Tony Grantham – Outside linebackers
- Buddy Green – Defensive coordinator/Secondary
- Ashley Ingram – Offensive line
- Ivin Jasper – Offensive coordinator/quarterbacks
- Steve Johns – Inside linebackers/special teams
- Keith Jones – Secondary
- Mike Judge – Fullbacks
- Shaun Nua – Defensive line
- Danny O'Rourke – Slot Backs
- Dale Pehrson – Defensive line
- Mick Yokitis – Wide receivers

Legend

- (C) Team captain
- (S) Suspended
- (I) Ineligible
- Injured
- Redshirt

Roster
Last update: September 7, 2012

=== Depth chart ===
The following players comprised the team's Depth chart prior to the 2012 Kraft Fight Hunger Bowl:

Defense

FS
Chris Ferguson
Wave Ryder
⋅

WLB	ILB	ILB	SLB
Jordan Drake	Brye French	Matt Warrick	⋅
Josh Tate	John Michael Nurthen	Cody Paterson	⋅
⋅	⋅	⋅	⋅

ROV
Tra'vas Bush
James Britton
⋅

CB
Parrish Gaines
Quincy Adams
⋅

DE	NT	DE
Evan Palelei	Barry Dabney	Wes Henderson
Paul Quessenberry	Travis Bridges	Josh Dowling-Fitzpatrick
⋅	⋅	⋅

CB
Jonathan Wev
Quincy Adams
⋅

Offense

WR
Brandon Turner
John O'Boyle
⋅

SB
Gee Gee Greene
Bo Snelson
⋅

LT	LG	C	RG	RT
Ryan Paulson	Josh Cabral	Tanner Fleming	Jake Zuzek	Graham Vickers
Bradyn Heap	Thomas Stone	Thomas Stone	Thomas Stone	Bradyn Heap
⋅	⋅	⋅	⋅	⋅

SB
John Howell
Darius Staten
⋅

WR
Shawn Lynch
Casey Bolena
⋅

QB
Trey Miller
Keenan Reynolds
⋅

FB
Noah Copeland
Prentice Christian
⋅

Special teams
PK Nick Sloan
PK Austin Grebe
P Pablo Beltan
P Justin Haan
KR Marcus Thomas

H Pablo Beltan
