= 2012 Fresno State Bulldogs football team =

American college football season

2012 Fresno State Bulldogs football

Mountain West co-champion

Hawaii Bowl, L 10–43 vs. SMU
- Conference: Mountain West Conference
- Record: 9–4 (7–1 MW)
- Head coach: Tim DeRuyter (1st season)
- Offensive coordinator: Dave Schramm (1st season)
- Offensive scheme: Spread
- Defensive coordinator: Nick Toth (1st season)
- Base defense: 3–4
- Home stadium: Bulldog Stadium

2012 Mountain West Conference football standings
	Conf.			Overall
Team	W		L	W		L
No. 18 Boise State +	7	–	1	11	–	2
Fresno State +	7	–	1	9	–	4
San Diego State +	7	–	1	9	–	4
Air Force	5	–	3	6	–	7
Nevada	4	–	4	7	–	6
Wyoming	3	–	5	4	–	8
Colorado State	3	–	5	4	–	8
UNLV	2	–	6	2	–	11
New Mexico	1	–	7	4	–	9
Hawaii	1	–	7	3	–	9
+ – Conference co-champions; Rankings from AP Poll

The 2012 Fresno State Bulldogs football team represented California State University, Fresno in the 2012 NCAA Division I FBS football season. The Bulldogs were led by first-year head coach Tim DeRuyter and played their home games at Bulldog Stadium. This was their first year as a member of the Mountain West Conference. They finished the season 9–4, 7–1 in Mountain West play to share the conference championship with Boise State and San Diego State. They were invited to the Hawaii Bowl where they were defeated by SMU.

== Personnel ==
=== Coaching staff ===
Name	Position	Seasons at Fresno State	Alma mater
Tim DeRuyter	Head coach	1st	Air Force (1985)
Dave Schramm	Offensive coordinator	1st	Adams State (1984)
Nick Toth	Defensive coordinator	1st	

== Schedule ==
Date	Time	Opponent	Site	TV	Result	Attendance
September 1	7:00 pm	Weber State*	Bulldog Stadium; Fresno, CA		W 37–10	27,663
September 8	3:30 pm	at No. 4 Oregon*	Autzen Stadium; Eugene, OR	P12N	L 25–42	55,755
September 15	5:00 pm	Colorado*	Bulldog Stadium; Fresno, CA	CBSSN	W 69–14	27,513
September 22	5:00 pm	at Tulsa*	Skelly Field at H. A. Chapman Stadium; Tulsa, OK	CBSSN	L 26–27	24,236
September 29	7:00 pm	San Diego State^{†}	Bulldog Stadium; Fresno, CA		W 52–40	33,894
October 6	4:00 pm	at Colorado State	Hughes Stadium; Fort Collins, CO	TWCSN/KTVD	W 28–7	25,814
October 13	12:30 pm	at No. 24 Boise State	Bronco Stadium; Boise, ID (Battle for the Milk Can)	NBCSN	L 10–20	35,742
October 20	7:30 pm	Wyoming	Bulldog Stadium; Fresno, CA	TWCSN/RTRM	W 42–14	29,423
October 27	12:30 pm	at New Mexico	University Stadium; Albuquerque, NM	TWCSN	W 49–32	19,856
November 3	4:00 pm	Hawaii	Bulldog Stadium; Fresno, CA (rivalry)	TWCSN	W 45–10	30,755
November 10	7:30 pm	at Nevada	Mackay Stadium; Reno, NV	NBCSN	W 52–36	22,104
November 24	12:30 pm	Air Force	Bulldog Stadium; Fresno, CA	NBCSN	W 48–15	36,240
December 24	5:00 pm	vs. SMU*	Aloha Stadium; Honolulu, HI (Hawaii Bowl)	ESPN	L 10–43	30,024
*Non-conference game; ^{†}Homecoming; Rankings from AP Poll released prior to the game; All times are in Pacific time

== Game summaries ==
=== Weber State ===
	1	2	3	4	Total
Wildcats	0	3	7	0	10
Bulldogs	14	10	0	13	37

=== At Oregon ===
	1	2	3	4	Total
Bulldogs	3	3	10	9	25
No. 4 Ducks	14	21	0	7	42

=== Colorado ===
	1	2	3	4	Total
Buffaloes	0	7	0	7	14
Bulldogs	35	20	7	7	69

=== At Tulsa ===
	1	2	3	4	Total
Bulldogs	20	0	6	0	26
Golden Hurricane	7	10	10	0	27

Last meeting was in the 2005 Liberty Bowl.

=== San Diego State ===
	1	2	3	4	Total
Aztecs	21	6	13	0	40
Bulldogs	7	29	10	6	52

=== At Colorado State ===
	1	2	3	4	Total
Bulldogs	7	7	0	14	28
Rams	0	0	0	7	7

Last meeting was in the 2008 New Mexico Bowl.

=== At Boise State ===
	1	2	3	4	Total
Bulldogs	0	0	3	7	10
No. 22 Broncos	7	10	0	3	20

=== Wyoming ===
	1	2	3	4	Total
Cowboys	0	0	7	7	14
Bulldogs	21	14	0	7	42

Last meeting was in the 2009 New Mexico Bowl.

=== At New Mexico ===
	1	2	3	4	Total
Bulldogs	0	14	21	14	49
Lobos	14	10	0	8	32

=== Hawaii ===
	1	2	3	4	Total
Warriors	0	3	0	7	10
Bulldogs	21	21	3	0	45

=== At Nevada ===
	1	2	3	4	Total
Bulldogs	7	14	23	8	52
Wolf Pack	7	14	0	15	36

=== Air Force ===
	1	2	3	4	Total
Falcons	0	7	0	8	15
Bulldogs	21	10	14	3	48

Last meeting was in the 2000 Silicon Valley Classic.

=== SMU–Hawaii Bowl ===
	1	2	3	4	Total
Bulldogs	0	0	7	3	10
Mustangs	0	22	7	14	43

== Awards and honors ==
- Quarterback Derek Carr was named Mountain West Conference's Offensive Player of the Year.
- Strong-safety Phillip Thomas was named the Mountain West Conference's Defensive Player of the Year, and was a unanimous All-American.
- Wide-receiver Davante Adams was named the Mountain West Conference's Freshman of the Year.
