= Ryker Mathews =

American gridiron football player (born 1992)

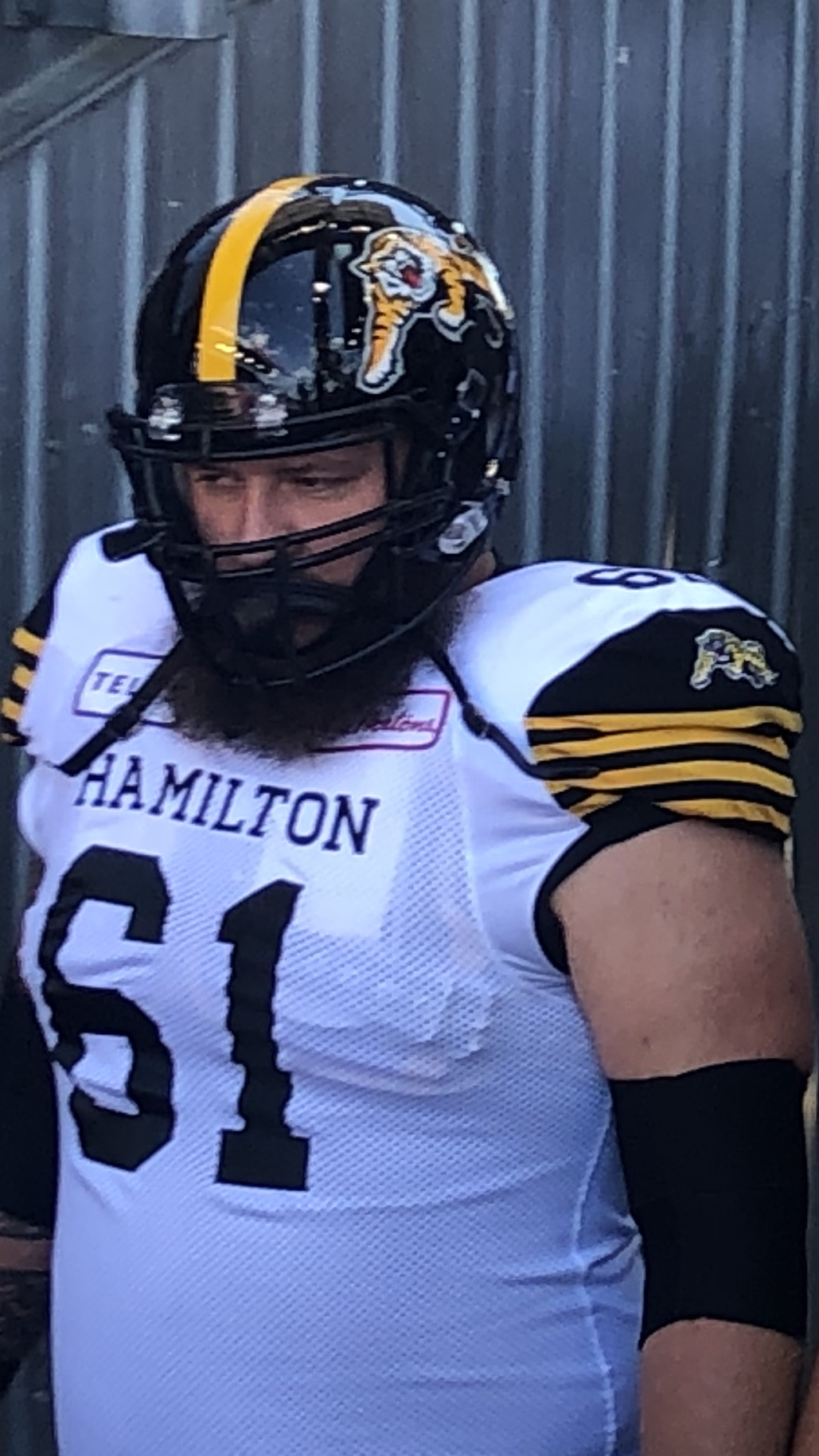
- Mathews with the Hamilton Tiger-Cats in 2019

No. 61, 72
- Position: Offensive tackle

Personal information
- Born: November 28, 1992 (age 33); American Fork, Utah, U.S.
- Listed height: 6 ft 6 in (1.98 m)
- Listed weight: 320 lb (145 kg)

Career information
- High school: American Fork (UT)
- College: BYU
- NFL draft: 2016: undrafted

Career history
- New Orleans Saints (2016)*; Hamilton Tiger-Cats (2017–2018); New England Patriots (2019)*; Hamilton Tiger-Cats (2019); BC Lions (2020–2021)
- * Offseason or practice squad member only

Awards and highlights
- CFL East All-Star (2019)
- Stats at CFL.ca

Ryker Mathews (born November 28, 1992) is an American professional football offensive tackle who played in the Canadian Football League (CFL). He attended Brigham Young University and went undrafted in the 2016 NFL draft. He was later signed by the New Orleans Saints.

== Professional career ==
=== New Orleans Saints ===
Mathews signed with the New Orleans Saints as an undrafted free agent on May 2, 2016. On August 1, 2016, he was waived by the Saints and placed on injured reserve. On September 16, 2016, he was cut from the New Orleans Saints.

=== Hamilton Tiger-Cats (first stint) ===
Mathews was signed by the Hamilton Tiger-Cats on July 25, 2017, and played for the team for two years.

=== New England Patriots ===
On January 14, 2019, Mathews signed a reserve/future contract with the New England Patriots. On May 2, 2019, the Patriots waived Matthews.

=== Hamilton Tiger-Cats (second stint) ===
On May 26, 2019, Mathews was re-signed by Hamilton.

=== BC Lions ===
Upon entering free agency, Mathews signed a two-year contract with the BC Lions on February 11, 2020.
