= 2008 Mountain West Conference football season =

- League: NCAA Division I FBS (Football Bowl Subdivision)
- Sport: Football
- Teams: 9

2009 NFL Draft
- Top draft pick: DE Paul Kruger, Utah
- Picked by: Baltimore Ravens, 57th overall

Regular Season
- Champion: Utah

Football seasons
- 2007 2009

The 2008 Mountain West Conference football season was the 10th since eight former members of the Western Athletic Conference banded together to form the MW. The University of Utah won their fourth conference championship, ending the year 13–0 with a victory over Alabama in the 2009 Sugar Bowl.

2008 Mountain West Conference football standings
	Conf.			Overall
Team	W		L	W		L
No. 2 Utah $	8	–	0	13	–	0
No. 7 TCU	7	–	1	11	–	2
No. 25 BYU	6	–	2	10	–	3
Air Force	5	–	3	8	–	5
Colorado State	4	–	4	7	–	6
UNLV	2	–	6	5	–	7
New Mexico	2	–	6	4	–	8
Wyoming	1	–	7	4	–	8
San Diego State	1	–	7	2	–	10
$ – Conference champion and BCS representative as top non-AQ school to meet automatic qualification criteria; Rankings from AP Poll

== Statistical leaders ==
Passing
Player	School	COMP	ATT	YDS	TD	INT
Max Hall	BYU	330	477	3957	35	14
Brian Johnson	Utah	268	394	2972	27	9
Billy Farris	Colorado St	233	379	2934	19	13

Rushing
Player	School	ATT	YDS	YPC	TD
Gartrell Johnson	Colorado St	278	1476	5.3	12
Devin Moore	Wyoming	249	1301	5.2	7
Harvey Unga	BYU	240	1132	4.7	11

Receiving
Player	School	REC	YDS	YPC	TD
Austin Collie	BYU	106	1538	14.5	15
Rashaun Greer	Colorado St	63	1114	17.7	3
Dennis Pitta	BYU	83	1083	13.0	6

Tackles
Player	School	SOLO	AST	TOTAL
Jason Beauchamp	UNLV	54	73	127
Ken Lamendola	Air Force	47	71	118
Matt Bauman	BYU	50	58	108

Sacks
Player	School	SACKS
Jerry Hughes	TCU	15.0
Jake Paulson	Air Force	9.0
Paul Kruger	Utah	7.5
Herbert Felder	New Mexico	7.5

Interceptions
Player	School	INT
Glover Quin	New Mexico	5
Sean Smith	Utah	5
Robert Johnson	Utah	4

== Memorable games ==
- Utah 25, Michigan 23

August 30, 2008 • Michigan Stadium • Ann Arbor, Michigan • ABC • Attendance: 108,421

Brian Johnson threw for 305 yards and a touchdown and Louie Sakoda was 4–4 on field goals as the Utes held on to beat Michigan on their home field.

- #15 BYU 28, Washington 27

September 6, 2008 • Husky Stadium • Seattle, Washington • FSN • Attendance: 64,611

In one of the year's most controversial endings, Washington quarterback Jake Locker scored on a 3-yard touchdown run with two seconds remaining, but was penalized 15 yards when he flipped the ball into the air in celebration. BYU defensive end Jan Jorgensen blocked the 35-yard extra point attempt, securing the win for the Cougars.

- Air Force 31, Houston 28

September 13, 2008 • Gerald J. Ford Stadium • Dallas, Texas • Attendance: 2,546

The Falcons' scheduled game at Houston was relocated because of Hurricane Ike, the effects of which could still very much be felt in Dallas. In high winds and intermittent rain, Air Force tallied 380 yards rushing and never attempted a pass in the victory.

- TCU 31, Stanford 14

September 13, 2008 • Amon G. Carter Stadium • Fort Worth, Texas • The Mtn • Attendance: 25,531

Across the Metroplex from the Air Force-Houston game, the Frogs' game against Stanford was moved up to the early afternoon because of Ike and was also played in less than pleasant weather conditions. TCU outlasted the Cardinal in a sloppy game, starting the Mountain West's 4-0 day against the Pac-10.

- #18 BYU 59, UCLA 0

September 13, 2008 • LaVell Edwards Stadium • Provo, Utah • Versus • Attendance: 64,153

Max Hall tied a BYU school record by throwing for 7 touchdown passes as the Cougars easily defeated UCLA in Provo. The Cougars forced four turnovers and blocked a field goal in handing the Bruins their worst defeat in 80 years.

- New Mexico 36, Arizona 28

September 13, 2008 • University Stadium • Albuquerque, New Mexico • CBS College • Attendance: 32,337

The Lobos had a little extra motivation in this one, after several Arizona players called New Mexico's 2007 win in Tucson a "fluke". Senior tailback Rodney Ferguson rushed for 158 yards to lead the attack.

- UNLV 23, #15 Arizona State 20 (OT)

September 13, 2008 • Sun Devil Stadium • Tempe, Arizona • FSN • Attendance: 59,852

By beating the 15th-ranked Sun Devils in their own stadium, the Rebels tallied their most impressive victory in recent memory. UNLV forced overtime by tying the game at 20 on an 8-yard touchdown pass from Omar Clayton to Phillip Payne with 18 seconds remaining in the 4th quarter. Kyle Watson then kicked a 20-yard field goal on the Rebels' overtime possession, and Malo Taumua blocked Arizona State kicker Thomas Weber's 35-yard field goal attempt to secure the win.

- #20 Utah 30, Air Force 23

September 20, 2008 • Falcon Stadium • Colorado Springs, Colorado • Versus • Attendance: 36,952

Utah running backs Darrell Mack and Matt Asiata both ran for more than a hundred yards, and Mack's third rushing touchdown of the day with 58 seconds remaining in the game gave the Utes the victory.

- UNLV 34, Iowa State 31 (OT)

September 20, 2008 • Sam Boyd Stadium • Las Vegas, Nevada • The Mtn • Attendance: 25,567

For the second consecutive week, the Rebels knocked off a team from one of the nation's elite conferences in overtime. The Cyclones had the ball first in overtime and kicked a 37-yard field goal. Then on the first play of the Rebels' possession, Omar Clayton threw his third touchdown of the game to Phillip Payne to win the game.

- #2 Oklahoma 35, #24 TCU 10

September 20, 2008 • Memorial Stadium • Norman, Oklahoma • FSN • Attendance: 85,158

In one of the Horned Frogs' two defeats of the 2008 season, the Sooners jumped out to a 28–3 halftime lead to secure the victory. The Frogs, however, did hold OU to just 25 yards rushing and 35 points- the Sooners' smallest point total of the year.

- #15 Utah 31, Oregon State 28

October 2, 2008 • Rice-Eccles Stadium • Salt Lake City, Utah • Versus • Attendance: 45,559

A week to the day after the Beavers had knocked off the nation's #1 team, Southern Cal, they fell to the Utes in a Thursday-night thriller. Oregon State led late into the fourth quarter, but Utah tied the game at 28–28 with 1:29 left when Brian Johnson hit Bradon Godfrey for a 25-yard touchdown pass and then Johnson ran the ball in for a two-point conversion. The Ute defense was able to hold for a three and out, which gave them the ball back with enough time for Louie Sakoda to kick a game-winning 37-yard field goal as time expired to run their record to 6–0.

- #24 TCU 32, #8 BYU 7

October 16, 2008 • Amon G. Carter Stadium • Fort Worth, Texas • Versus • Attendance: 36,180

In a highly anticipated matchup of ranked MW teams, the Horned Frogs jumped out to a 23–0 halftime lead and never looked back. TCU sacked Max Hall 6 times- including 4 by All-American defensive end Jerry Hughes- and debuted their "Wild Frog" formation with wide receiver Jeremy Kerley lining up at quarterback.

- #9 Utah 13, #11 TCU 10

November 6, 2008 • Rice-Eccles Stadium • Salt Lake City, Utah • CBS College • Attendance: 45,666

Coming into this Thursday-night matchup, the Frogs were 9–1 and the Utes 9–0 with the winner putting themselves in good position for a BCS Bowl bid. The Frogs led 10–0 early, but were unable to improve upon that lead. TCU freshman kicker Ross Evans missed two field goals in the fourth quarter, and Brian Johnson hit Freddie Brown for a 9-yard touchdown pass with 48 seconds remaining to give the Utes the 13–10 victory.

- Wyoming 13, Tennessee 7

November 8, 2008 • Neyland Stadium • Knoxville, Tennessee • ESPN GamePlan • Attendance: 99,489

In a defensive battle, Cowboys' linebacker Ward Dobbs returned an interception 24 yards to give Wyoming a 13–0 halftime lead. Despite a few drives into Wyoming territory in the second half, the Volunteers were only able to score 7 points. The defeat may have cost Tennessee coach Phillip Fulmer his job.

- #7 Utah 48, #14 BYU 24

November 22, 2008 • Rice-Eccles Stadium • Salt Lake City, Utah • The Mtn • Attendance: 46,488

In the annual Holy War game, Utah picked off BYU quarterback Max Hall five times as the Utes claimed an outright conference championship, a BCS Bowl bid and their third undefeated regular season in school history.

== Bowl games ==
=== New Mexico Bowl ===
- Colorado State 40, Fresno State 35

December 20, 2008 • University Stadium • Albuquerque, New Mexico • ESPN

Colorado State running back Gartrell Johnson ran for 285 yards and scored two touchdowns in the Rams' 20-point fourth quarter surge to beat Fresno State in the New Mexico Bowl. Johnson's 77-yard touchdown run with 1:46 remaining gave the Rams the lead for good, securing their first bowl win since 2001.

=== Las Vegas Bowl ===
- Arizona 31, #16 BYU 21

December 20, 2008 • Sam Boyd Stadium • Las Vegas, Nevada • ESPN

In the Cougars' fourth-consecutive trip to the Las Vegas Bowl, they outgained the Wildcats 444 yards to 416, but were unable to turn that offensive production into points and lost.

=== Poinsettia Bowl ===
- #11 TCU 17, #9 Boise State 16

December 23, 2008 • Qualcomm Stadium • San Diego, California • ESPN

In a game of teams whose BCS dreams were dashed late in the season, Boise State jumped out to an early 10–0 lead, but TCU running back Aaron Brown cut the lead to 13–7 with a 16-yard touchdown run with 24 seconds remaining in the first half. The Frogs took the lead for good on Joseph Turner's 17-yard touchdown run with 8:51 remaining in the fourth quarter. The win gave TCU their 3rd 11-win season in the last 4 years, and was Boise State's lone defeat of the year.

=== Armed Forces Bowl ===
- Houston 34, Air Force 28

December 31, 2008 • Amon G. Carter Stadium • Fort Worth, Texas • ESPN

In a rare bowl game featuring a rematch from the regular season, the Cougars earned a season split with the Falcons with a 34–28 win. It was the Falcons' second consecutive appearance-and loss- in the Armed Forces Bowl, and was the Cougars' first bowl victory since 1980.

=== Sugar Bowl ===
- #6 Utah 31, #4 Alabama 17

January 2, 2009 • Louisiana Superdome • New Orleans, Louisiana • FOX

As a result of their 12–0 regular season and Mountain West Conference title, the Utes earned a spot in the Sugar Bowl and the $17 million pay-out that comes with it. They were heavy underdogs to Alabama, the SEC team that had spent much of the year ranked number one. The Utes jumped out to a 21–0 first quarter lead, but the Tide had pulled to within 21–17 early in the third quarter. The Utes responded with a 7-play, 71-yard drive capped by a Brian Johnson to David Reed touchdown pass, and added a Louie Sakoda field goal late in the fourth quarter to secure the 31–17 victory. Johnson ended the game with 336 yards passing and three touchdowns, and the Ute defense sacked Alabama quarterback John Parker Wilson eight times.

== Awards ==
- Coach of the Year: Kyle Whittingham, Utah
- Offensive Player of the Year: QB Brian Johnson, Sr, Utah
- Defensive Player of the Year: DE Jerry Hughes, Sr, TCU
- Special Teams Player of the Year: K/P Louie Sakoda, Sr, Utah
- Freshman of the Year: QB Tim Jefferson, Air Force

== All-conference teams ==
First-Team:

Offense
Quarterback	Brian Johnson, Sr, Utah
Running back	Gartrell Johnson, Sr, Colorado State; Devin Moore, Sr, Wyoming
Wide receiver	Austin Collie, Jr, BYU; Ryan Wolfe, Jr, UNLV
Tight end	Dennis Pitta, Jr, BYU
Offensive line	Blake Schlueter, Sr, TCU; Ray Feinga, Sr, BYU; Dallas Reynolds, Sr, BYU; Zane Beadles, Jr, Utah; Robert Conley, Sr, Utah
Kicker	Louie Sakoda, Sr, Utah
Kick returner	Jeremy Kerley, So, TCU

Defense
Defensive line	Jan Jorgensen, Jr, BYU; Jerry Hughes, Jr, TCU; Paul Kruger, So, Utah; Jake Paulson, Sr, Air Force
Linebacker	Robert Henson, Sr, TCU; Jason Phillips, Sr, TCU; Ward Dobbs, Sr, Wyoming
Defensive back	Glover Quin, Sr, New Mexico; Brice McCain, Sr, Utah; Stephen Hodge, Sr, TCU; Sean Smith, Jr, Utah
Punter	Louie Sakoda, Sr, Utah

Second-Team:

Offense
Quarterback	Max Hall, Jr, BYU
Running back	Harvey Unga, So, BYU; Rodney Ferguson, Sr, New Mexico
Wide receiver	Rashaun Greer, Jr, Colorado State; Freddie Brown, Sr, Utah
Tight end	Kory Sperry, Sr, Colorado State
Offensive line	Nick Charles, Jr, Air Force; Travis Bright, Sr, BYU; Shelley Smith, Jr, Colorado State; Erik Cook, Jr, New Mexico; Marshall Newhouse, Jr, TCU
Kicker	Ryan Harrison, Sr, Air Force
Kick returner	Ian Clark, Jr, New Mexico

Defense
Defensive line	Cody Moore, Sr, TCU; Matt Panfil, Sr, TCU; Koa Misi, Jr, Utah; John Fletcher, Jr, Wyoming
Linebacker	David Nixon, Sr, BYU; Jason Beauchamp, Jr, UNLV; Stevenson Sylvester, Jr, Utah
Defensive back	Chris Thomas, Jr, Air Force; DeAndre Wright, Sr, New Mexico; Steven Coleman, Sr, TCU; Rafael Priest, Jr, Utah
Punter	Anthony Hartz, Jr, Colorado State
