= Rafael Priest =

American football player (born 1987)

No. 29
- Position: Cornerback

Personal information
- Born: March 11, 1987 (age 39); Dallas, Texas, U.S.
- Listed height: 5 ft 10 in (1.78 m)
- Listed weight: 180 lb (82 kg)

Career information
- High school: James Madison (Dallas)
- College: TCU (2005–2009)
- NFL draft: 2010: undrafted

Career history
- New Orleans Saints (2010)*; Atlanta Falcons (2011)*; BC Lions (2011); Montreal Alouettes (2012)*
- * Offseason or practice squad member only

Awards and highlights
- Grey Cup champion (2011); Third-team All-American (2009); First-team All-MW (2009); Second-team All-MW (2008)

Career CFL statistics
- Games played: 1
- Tackles: 1
- Stats at CFL.ca
- Stats at Pro Football Reference

Rafael Montre Priest (born March 11, 1987) is an American former professional football cornerback who played in the Canadian Football League (CFL) with the BC Lions. He played college football for the TCU Horned Frogs. Priest also had a stint in the National Football League (NFL) for the New Orleans Saints and Atlanta Falcons.

== Early life ==
Priest was born on March 11, 1987, in Dallas, Texas. He attended James Madison High School in Dallas.

== College career ==
Priest played college football for the TCU Horned Frogs from 2005 to 2009 and was a four-year letterman from 2006 to 2009. He redshirted his first season and became a four-year starter, playing 53 games in his career. Priest totaled 108 tackles, including two for loss, five interceptions, 41 pass break ups and two fumble recoveries. He was a second-team and first-team All-MW selection in 2008 and 2009, respectively. As a senior, Priest earned third-team All-America honors by The Sporting News.

== Professional career ==
Pre-draft measurables
Height	Weight	Vertical jump	Broad jump	Bench press
5 ft 10 in (1.78 m)	183 lb (83 kg)	29 in (0.74 m)	9 ft 7 in (2.92 m)	20 reps
All values from Pro day

=== New Orleans Saints ===
After going undrafted in the 2010 NFL draft, Priest signed with the New Orleans Saints as an undrafted free agent. He was released prior to the start of the season.

=== Atlanta Falcons ===
On February 11, 2011, Priest signed a reserve/futures contract with the Atlanta Falcons. On September 2, he was waived by the team.

=== BC Lions ===
On September 27, 2011, Priest was signed by the BC Lions of the Canadian Football League (CFL). He dressed in his first and only game against the Montreal Alouettes on November 5. Priest made one special teams tackle and spent the rest of the season on the practice roster as the Lions won the 99th Grey Cup. he became a free agent at the end of the year.

=== Montreal Alouettes ===
On May 7, 2012, Priest signed with the Montreal Alouettes. On June 12, he was placed on the league suspension list. On February 11, 2014, Priest became a free agent.
