= 2008 Washington Huskies football team =

American college football season

2008 Washington Huskies football
- Conference: Pacific-10 Conference
- Record: 0–12 (0–9 Pac-10)
- Head coach: Tyrone Willingham (4th season)
- Offensive coordinator: Tim Lappano (4th season)
- Offensive scheme: Spread
- Defensive coordinator: Ed Donatell (1st season)
- Base defense: 3–4
- MVPs: D'Andre Goodwin (O); Mason Foster (D)
- Captains: Juan Garcia (2nd year); Michael Gottlieb; Johnie Kirton; Daniel Te'o-Nesheim
- Home stadium: Husky Stadium

2008 Pacific-10 Conference football standings
| | Conf. | | | Overall |
| Team | W | | L | W | | L |
|---|---|---|---|---|---|---|
| No. 3 USC $ | 8 | – | 1 | 12 | – | 1 |
| No. 10 Oregon | 7 | – | 2 | 10 | – | 3 |
| No. 18 Oregon State | 7 | – | 2 | 9 | – | 4 |
| California | 6 | – | 3 | 9 | – | 4 |
| Arizona | 5 | – | 4 | 8 | – | 5 |
| Arizona State | 4 | – | 5 | 5 | – | 7 |
| Stanford | 4 | – | 5 | 5 | – | 7 |
| UCLA | 3 | – | 6 | 4 | – | 8 |
| Washington State | 1 | – | 8 | 2 | – | 11 |
| Washington | 0 | – | 9 | 0 | – | 12 |
$ – Conference champion; Rankings from AP Poll

The 2008 Washington Huskies football team represented the University of Washington in the 2008 NCAA Division I FBS football season. Led by fourth-year head coach Tyrone Willingham, the team played its home games at Husky Stadium in Seattle. The Huskies were winless at 0–12, the worst record in the program's history.

On October 27, the Monday after a 33–7 home loss to Notre Dame, it was announced that Willingham would step down as head coach at the end of the season. UW president Mark Emmert indicated the decision to fire Willingham had been made shortly after the prior week's game against Oregon State. Athletic director Scott Woodward said the announcement ended speculation of what was going to happen with Willingham, who had a year remaining on his contract.

"It became quite obvious that the performance on the football field wasn't up to what we talked about at the beginning of the season and previous to the season and it became more obvious as time went on," Woodward said in explaining his decision to make the move.

== Schedule ==
| Date | Time | Opponent | Site | TV | Result | Attendance |
|---|---|---|---|---|---|---|
| August 30 | 7:00 p.m. | at No. 21 Oregon | Autzen Stadium; Eugene, OR (rivalry) | FSN | L 10–44 | 58,778 |
| September 6 | 12:00 p.m. | No. 15 BYU* | Husky Stadium; Seattle, WA | FSN | L 27–28 | 64,611 |
| September 13 | 4:45 p.m. | No. 3 Oklahoma* | Husky Stadium; Seattle, WA | ESPN | L 14–55 | 67,716 |
| September 27 | 7:00 p.m. | Stanford | Husky Stadium; Seattle, WA | FSNNW | L 28–35 | 61,968 |
| October 4 | 4:30 p.m. | at Arizona | Arizona Stadium; Tucson, AZ | Versus | L 14–48 | 55,624 |
| October 18 | 4:00 p.m. | Oregon State^{†} | Husky Stadium; Seattle, WA | Versus | L 13–34 | 63,996 |
| October 25 | 5:00 p.m. | Notre Dame* | Husky Stadium; Seattle, WA | ESPN2 | L 7–33 | 70,437 |
| November 1 | 3:30 p.m. | at No. 7 USC | Los Angeles Memorial Coliseum; Los Angeles, CA | FSN | L 0–56 | 80,216 |
| November 8 | 4:00 p.m. | Arizona State | Husky Stadium; Seattle, WA | FSNNW | L 19–39 | 57,013 |
| November 15 | 7:15 p.m. | UCLA | Husky Stadium; Seattle, WA | FSN | L 7–27 | 59,738 |
| November 22 | 12:00 p.m. | at Washington State | Martin Stadium; Pullman, WA (Apple Cup) | FSN | L 13–16 ^{2OT} | 32,211 |
| December 6 | 12:00 p.m. | at California | California Memorial Stadium; Berkeley, CA | FSN | L 7–48 | 50,038 |
*Non-conference game; ^{†}Homecoming; Rankings from AP Poll released prior to the game; All times are in Pacific time

== Roster ==
2008 Washington Huskies football team roster
Players
Coaches
Offense

| Pos. | # | Name | Class |
|---|---|---|---|
| WR | 9 | Devin Aguilar | Fr |
| OT | 68 | Mark Armelin | Fr |
| QB | 7 | Taylor Bean | Fr |
| QB | 16 | Dominique Blackman | Fr |
| WR | 5 | Anthony Boyles | Fr |
| RB | 22 | Demitrius Bronson | Fr |
| WR | 7 | Cody Bruns | Fr |
| G | 72 | Casey Bulyca | Sr |
| OL | 78 | Allen Carroll | Fr |
| WR | 28 | Tony Chidiac | So |
| C | 61 | Gregory Christine | So |
| RB | 27 | Terrance Dailey | Fr |
| OL | 67 | Skyler Fancher | Fr |
| RB | 36 | Johri Fogerson | Fr |
| QB | 8 | Ronnie Fouch | Fr |
| RB | 20 | David Freeman | Fr |
| C | 58 | Juan Garcia (C) | Sr |
| WR | 11 | D'Andre Goodwin | So |
| TE | 86 | Michael Gottlieb (C) | Sr |
| RB | 21 | Willie Griffin | Fr |
| OT | 71 | Cody Habben | So |
| WR | 88 | Charles Hawkins | Sr |
| FB | 30 | Paul Homer | Jr |
| OL | 51 | Mykenna Ikehara | Fr |
| TE | 4 | Chris Izbicki | Fr |
| RB | 6 | Brandon Johnson | So |
| WR | 15 | Jermaine Kearse | Fr |
| FB | 32 | Luke Kravitz | Sr |
| QB | 12 | Luther Leonard | Fr |
| QB | 10 | Jake Locker (injured) | So |
| WR | 3 | Alvin Logan | Fr |
| C | 62 | Robert Lukevich | Sr |
| TE | 8 | Kavario Middleton | Fr |
| OT | 79 | Ben Ossai | Jr |
| WR | 82 | Jordan Polk | Fr |
| G | 70 | Morgan Rosborough | Jr |
| TE | 87 | Romeo Savant | Fr |
| OL | 73 | Drew Schaefer | Fr |
| OL | 64 | Matt Sedillo | So |
| WR | 14 | Curtis Shaw | So |
| OL | 77 | Scott Shugert | Fr |
| FB | 47 | Austin Sylvester | Fr |
| OL | 75 | Terence Thomas | Fr |
| FB | 41 | Tobias Togi | Fr |
| G | 65 | Ryan Tolar | So |
| G | 76 | Jordan White-Frisbee | Sr |
| TE | 83 | Walt Winter | Sr |
| RB | 35 | Brandon Yakaboski | Fr |

Defense

| Pos. | # | Name | Class |
|---|---|---|---|
| SS | 41 | Victor Aiyewa | So |
| DL | 50 | Kalani Aldrich | Fr |
| LB | 9 | Donald Butler | Jr |
| DB | 42 | Mick Connors | Fr |
| CB | 18 | Byron Davenport | Sr |
| CB | 21 | Desmond Davis | Sr |
| LB | 31 | Cort Dennison | Fr |
| DT | 91 | Tyrone Duncan | Fr |
| DT | 99 | Cameron Elisara | So |
| CB | 23 | Mesphin Forrester | Sr |
| LB | 40 | Mason Foster | So |
| LB | 24 | Joshua Gage | Jr |
| DE | 53 | Pete Galbraith | Fr |
| CB | 20 | Justin Glenn | Fr |
| CB | 7 | Anthony Gobern | Fr |
| FS | 15 | Darin Harris | Sr |
| LB | 5 | Matt Houston | So |
| LB | 54 | Brandon Huppert | So |
| DB | 34 | Tripper Johnson | Jr |
| DE | 59 | Darrion Jones | Jr |
| DL | 95 | Noah Keats Sall | Sr |
| DL | 93 | Senio Kelemete | Fr |
| DL | 37 | Johnie Kirton (C) | Sr |
| CB | 27 | Adam Long | Fr |
| LB | 32 | Kurt Mangum | Fr |
| DE | 96 | De'Shon Matthews | So |
| CB | 6 | Vonzell McDowell Jr. | So |
| CB | 19 | Matt Mosley | So |
| DL | 79 | Craig Noble | Fr |
| DT | 55 | Jovon O'Connor | Sr |
| CB | 38 | Marquis Persley | Fr |
| LB | 43 | T. J. Poe | Jr |
| DB | 1 | Chris Polk | Fr |
| DE | 89 | Conrad Remington | Fr |
| CB | 28 | Quinton Richardson | Fr |
| LB | 35 | Bradley Roussel | Fr |
| LB | 22 | E. J. Savannah | Jr |
| LB | 29 | Chris Stevens | Sr |
| DL | 74 | Alamedo Ta'amu | Fr |
| S | 11 | Vince Taylor | Fr |
| DE | 66 | Daniel Te'o-Nesheim (C) | Jr |
| DE | 92 | Everette Thompson | Fr |
| LB | 57 | Trenton Tuiasosopo | Sr |
| S | 39 | Greg Walker | Fr |
| FS | 26 | Jason Wells | Sr |
| LB | 97 | Fred Wiggs | So |
| FS | 8 | Nate Williams | So |
| DL | 52 | Nick Wood | Fr |

Special teams

| Pos. | # | Name | Class |
|---|---|---|---|
| P, PK | 12 | Jared Ballman | Sr |
| PK | 17 | Erik Folk | Fr |
| LS | 56 | Ben Hayes | Fr |
| LS | 60 | Brendan Lopez | Fr |
| LS | 62 | Robert Lukevich | Sr |
| LS | 49 | Danny Morovick | Jr |
| PK | 13 | Ryan Perkins | Jr |
| P | 94 | Kiel Rasp | Fr |
| PK | 89 | Cory Rutkowski | Fr |

Head coach

- Tyrone Willingham

Coordinators/assistant coaches

- Tim Lappano
  Offensive coordinator/Quarterbacks
- Ed Donatell
  Defensive coordinator
- Charlie Baggett
  Receivers
- Mike Denbrock
  Offensive line
- Steve Gervais
  Running backs
- Brian White
  Tight ends/Special teams
- Randy Hart
  Defensive line
- Chris Tormey
  Linebackers
- J. D. Williams
  Defensive backs
- Luke Huard
  Graduate assistant

Legend

- (C) Team captain
- (S) Suspended
- (I) Ineligible
- Injured
- Redshirt

Roster
Last update: June 7, 2024

== Game summaries ==
=== At No. 21 Oregon ===
Washington Huskies at No. 21 Oregon Ducks – Game summary

| Quarter | 1 | 2 | 3 | 4 | Total |
|---|---|---|---|---|---|
| Huskies | 0 | 10 | 0 | 0 | 10 |
| No. 21 Ducks | 14 | 0 | 7 | 23 | 44 |

at Autzen Stadium, Eugene, Oregon

- Date: August 30
- Game time: 7:00 p.m. PDT
- Game weather: Mostly sunny, 67 °F (19 °C)
- Game attendance: 58,778
- Referee: Jay Stricherz
- TV: FSN
- Box score, Recap

Game information
First quarter
- ORE – Jeremiah Johnson 4-yard run (Matt Evensen kick), 10:20. Ducks 7–0. Drive: 4 plays, 63 yards, 1:24.
- ORE – Terrence Scott 60-yard pass from Justin Roper (Matt Evensen kick), 5:13. Ducks 14–0. Drive: 3 plays, 60 yards, 0:43.

Second quarter

- WASH – Ryan Perkins 35-yard field goal, 12:15. Ducks 14–3. Drive: 11 plays, 62 yards, 4:54.
- WASH – Paul Homer 1-yard run (Ryan Perkins kick), 3:17. Ducks 14–10. Drive: 13 plays, 60 yards, 6:23.

Third quarter

- ORE – Jeremiah Johnson 13-yard run (Matt Evensen kick), 10:55. Ducks 21–10. Drive: 5 plays, 59 yards, 1:14.

Fourth quarter

- ORE – Matt Evensen 41-yard field goal, 14:28. Ducks 24–10. Drive: 7 plays, 14 yards, 1:51.
- ORE – Jaison Williams 48-yard pass from Jeremiah Masoli (kick failed), 11:02. Ducks 30–10. Drive: 2 plays, 53 yards, 0:18.
- ORE – Jeff Maehl 25-yard pass from Jeremiah Masoli (Matt Evensen kick), 7:21. Ducks 37–10. Drive: 8 plays, 55 yards, 2:33.
- ORE – Chris Harper 2-yard run (Morgan Flint kick), 0:46. Ducks 44–10. Drive: 8 plays, 42 yards, 2:50.

| Statistics | WASH | ORE |
|---|---|---|
| First downs | 18 | 23 |
| Total yards | 242 | 496 |
| Rushing yards | 95 | 256 |
| Passing yards | 147 | 240 |
| Turnovers | 1 | 1 |
| Time of possession | 35:43 | 24:17 |

| Team | Category | Player | Statistics |
|---|---|---|---|
| Washington | Passing | Jake Locker | 12/28, 103 yards |
| Washington | Rushing | Jake Locker | 16 rushes, 57 yards |
| Washington | Receiving | D'Andre Goodwin | 10 receptions, 71 yards |
| Oregon | Passing | Jeremiah Masoli | 9/17, 126 yards, 2 TD |
| Oregon | Rushing | Jeremiah Johnson | 15 rushes, 124 yards, 2 TD |
| Oregon | Receiving | Jeremiah Johnson | 16 receptions, 137 yards, 2 TD |

Washington opened the season with a game versus the Oregon Ducks at Autzen Stadium. It was the first time Washington opened the season with a conference opponent since 1998, when they defeated Arizona State, 42–38 in Tempe, Arizona.

Oregon crushed the Huskies, 44–10. Washington averaged a mere 2.2 rushing yards per carry, and was held scoreless in the second half.

"We just couldn't run the ball", coach Tyrone Willingham said.

The win was the 5th straight for the Ducks against the Huskies, which marks the first time Oregon has accomplished that feat since the series began in 1900.

=== No. 15 BYU ===
No. 15 BYU Cougars at Washington Huskies – Game summary

| Quarter | 1 | 2 | 3 | 4 | Total |
|---|---|---|---|---|---|
| No. 15 Cougars | 7 | 7 | 7 | 7 | 28 |
| Huskies | 7 | 7 | 7 | 6 | 27 |

at Husky Stadium, Seattle, Washington

- Date: September 6
- Game time: 12:00 p.m. PDT
- Game weather: Light overcast, 65 °F (18 °C)
- Game attendance: 64,611
- Referee: Larry Farina
- TV announcers (FSN): Barry Tompkins, Petros Papadakis, and John Jackson
- Box score, Recap

Game information
First quarter
- BYU – Austin Collie 38-yard pass from Max Hall (Mitch Payne kick), 9:38. Cougars 7–0. Drive: 9 plays, 76 yards, 5:22.
- WASH – Jake Locker 14-yard run (Ryan Perkins kick), 3:24. Tied 7–7. Drive: 7 plays, 66 yards, 3:52.

Second quarter

- WASH – Jermaine Kearse 48-yard pass from Jake Locker (Ryan Perkins kick), 10:38. Huskies 14–7. Drive: 7 plays, 79 yards, 3:25.
- BYU – Andrew George 1-yard pass from Max Hall (Mitch Payne kick), 4:18. Tied 14–14. Drive: 14 plays, 71 yards, 6:11.

Third quarter

- WASH – Luke Kravitz 1-yard run (Ryan Perkins kick), 7:38. Huskies 21–14. Drive: 13 plays, 65 yards, 7:12.
- BYU – Fui Vakapuna 11-yard run (Mitch Payne kick), 4:17. Tied 21–21. Drive: 7 plays, 63 yards, 3:11.

Fourth quarter

- BYU – Dennis Pitta 15-yard pass from Max Hall (Mitch Payne kick), 3:31. Cougars 28–21. Drive: 9 plays, 84 yards, 4:39.
- WASH – Jake Locker 3-yard run (kick blocked), 0:03. Cougars 28–27. Drive: 7 plays, 76 yards, 3:24.

| Statistics | BYU | WASH |
|---|---|---|
| First downs | 25 | 22 |
| Total yards | 475 | 337 |
| Rushing yards | 137 | 133 |
| Passing yards | 338 | 204 |
| Turnovers | 2 | 0 |
| Time of possession | 31:04 | 28:56 |

| Team | Category | Player | Statistics |
|---|---|---|---|
| BYU | Passing | Max Hall | 30/41, 338 yards, 3 TD, INT |
| BYU | Rushing | Harvey Unga | 23 rushes, 136 yards |
| BYU | Receiving | Dennis Pitta | 10 receptions, 148 yards, TD |
| Washington | Passing | Jake Locker | 17/32, 204 yards, TD |
| Washington | Rushing | Jake Locker | 18 rushes, 62 yards, 2 TD |
| Washington | Receiving | D'Andre Goodwin | 5 receptions, 83 yards |

The Huskies and Cougars met for the seventh time, with #15 BYU avoiding the upset in front of 64,611 fans at Husky Stadium.

A late Washington rally fell short and the game ended in controversy. Quarterback Jake Locker scored on a 3-yard touchdown run with 2 seconds remaining in the game, cutting BYU's lead to 28–27. But Locker was flagged for unsportsmanlike conduct, and the extra point attempt was moved back 15 yards. The ensuing PAT try was blocked, BYU players rushed the field, and a chorus of boos rained down from the Husky faithful.

"After scoring the touchdown, the player threw the ball into the air and we are required, by rule, to assess a 15-yard unsportsmanlike conduct penalty", Referee Larry Farina said in a statement given to Washington officials. "It is a celebration rule that we are required to call. It was not a judgment call."

Cougar quarterback Max Hall had 339 yards passing and three touchdowns, including a 15-yarder to tight end Dennis Pitta with 3:31 left in the game.

Locker finished 17-for-32 passing for 204 yards and added 62 yards rushing on 18 carries.

Washington safety Nate Williams had a game high 13 tackles. He also put the hit on BYU tailback Harvey Unga that forced a touchdown saving fumble that UW's Tripper Johnson recovered in the end zone in the 4th quarter.

=== No. 3 Oklahoma ===
No. 3 Oklahoma Sooners at Washington Huskies – Game summary

| Quarter | 1 | 2 | 3 | 4 | Total |
|---|---|---|---|---|---|
| No. 3 Sooners | 13 | 21 | 14 | 7 | 55 |
| Huskies | 0 | 0 | 7 | 7 | 14 |

at Husky Stadium, Seattle, Washington

- Date: September 13
- Game time: 4:45 p.m. PDT
- Game weather: Clear, 74 °F (23 °C)
- Game attendance: 67,716
- Referee: Brian O'Cain
- TV announcers (ESPN): Mike Patrick, Todd Blackledge, and Holly Rowe
- Box score, Recap

Game information
First quarter
- OKLA – Juaquin Iglesias 13-yard pass from Sam Bradford (Jimmy Stevens kick), 11:17. Sooners 7–0. Drive: 8 plays, 51 yards, 2:10.
- OKLA – Jermaine Gresham 22-yard pass from Sam Bradford (kick failed), 0:53. Sooners 13–0. Drive: 2 plays, 47 yards, 0:21.

Second quarter

- OKLA – Sam Bradford 1-yard run (Jimmy Stevens kick), 9:45. Sooners 20–0. Drive: 9 plays, 70 yards, 2:38.
- OKLA – Ryan Broyles 4-yard pass from Sam Bradford (Jimmy Stevens kick), 3:52. Sooners 27–0. Drive: 10 plays, 79 yards, 3:51.
- OKLA – Mossis Madu 1-yard run (Jimmy Stevens kick), 1:47. Sooners 34–0. Drive: 5 plays, 24 yards, 1:55.

Third quarter

- OKLA – Ryan Broyles 77-yard pass from Sam Bradford (Jimmy Stevens kick), 13:42. Sooners 41–0. Drive: 3 plays, 89 yards, 1:09.
- WASH – Jake Locker 15-yard run (Ryan Perkins kick), 5:37. Sooners 41–7. Drive: 15 plays, 83 yards, 7:56.
- OKLA – Jermaine Gresham 64-yard pass from Sam Bradford (Jimmy Stevens kick), 3:25. Sooners 48–7. Drive: 5 plays, 80 yards, 2:12.

Fourth quarter

- OKLA – Mossis Madu 3-yard run (Jimmy Stevens kick), 13:16. Sooners 55–7. Drive: 10 plays, 68 yards, 3:23.
- WASH – Brandon Yakaboski 38-yard pass from Ronnie Fouch (Jared Ballman kick), 10:02. Sooners 55–14. Drive: 7 plays, 80 yards, 3:14.

| Statistics | OKLA | WASH |
|---|---|---|
| First downs | 28 | 23 |
| Total yards | 591 | 336 |
| Rushing yards | 274 | 87 |
| Passing yards | 317 | 249 |
| Turnovers | 0 | 3 |
| Time of possession | 27:56 | 32:04 |

| Team | Category | Player | Statistics |
|---|---|---|---|
| Oklahoma | Passing | Sam Bradford | 18/21, 304 yards, 5 TD |
| Oklahoma | Rushing | Chris Brown | 13 rushes, 107 yards |
| Oklahoma | Receiving | Jermaine Gresham | 3 receptions, 99 yards, 2 TD |
| Washington | Passing | Jake Locker | 16/24, 154 yards |
| Washington | Rushing | Jake Locker | 12 rushes, 44 yards, TD |
| Washington | Receiving | D'Andre Goodwin | 9 receptions, 82 yards |

Oklahoma quarterback Sam Bradford completed 18 of 21 passes for 304 yards, matched his career high with five touchdown passes and ran for a sixth score to lead the Sooners in a rout against the overmatched Huskies, 55–14.

The Sooners scored their most points on the road against a school from a BCS conference since a 56–25 win at Texas Tech on November 22, 2003. They also handed Washington its largest margin of defeat at home since October 12, 1929, when it lost 48–0 to Southern California, a scant two weeks before the Wall Street Crash of 1929.

Washington lost three fumbles, missed two field goals and punted three times in the first half. The Huskies went into the locker room down 34–0 and didn't get on the board until Jake Locker scored on a 15-yard touchdown run with 5:37 remaining in the 3rd quarter.

Oklahoma, the highest-ranked nonconference team to visit Husky Stadium since 1969, gained 591 yards of total offense on the day.

=== Stanford ===
Stanford Cardinal at Washington Huskies – Game summary

| Quarter | 1 | 2 | 3 | 4 | Total |
|---|---|---|---|---|---|
| Cardinal | 7 | 14 | 7 | 7 | 35 |
| Huskies | 7 | 7 | 7 | 7 | 28 |

at Husky Stadium, Seattle, Washington

- Date: September 27
- Game time: 7:00 p.m. PDT
- Game weather: Scattered clouds, 64 °F (18 °C)
- Game attendance: 61,968
- Referee: Jay Stricherz
- TV: FSNNW
- Box score, Recap

Game information
First quarter
- WASH – Brandon Johnson 1-yard run (Ryan Perkins kick), 7:35. Huskies 7–0. Drive: 5 plays, 34 yards, 2:25.
- STAN – Anthony Kimble 13-yard run (Aaron Zagory kick), 4:16. Tied 7–7. Drive: 7 plays, 62 yards, 3:07.

Second quarter

- STAN – Jim Dray 11-yard pass from Tavita Pritchard (Aaron Zagory kick), 8:34. Cardinal 14–7. Drive: 12 plays, 80 yards, 5:30.
- WASH – Brandon Johnson 1-yard run (Ryan Perkins kick), 3:11. Tied 14–14. Drive: 12 plays, 76 yards, 5:13.
- STAN – Doug Baldwin 61-yard pass from Tavita Pritchard (Aaron Zagory kick), 1:36. Cardinal 21–14. Drive: 5 plays, 77 yards, 1:27.

Third quarter

- STAN – Anthony Kimble 83-yard run (Aaron Zagory kick), 9:35. Cardinal 28–14. Drive: 1 play, 83 yards, 0:13.
- WASH – Jermaine Kearse 5-yard pass from Ronnie Fouch (Ryan Perkins kick), 6:14. Cardinal 28–21. Drive: 7 plays, 69 yards, 3:14.

Fourth quarter

- STAN – Ryan Whalen 18-yard pass from Tavita Pritchard (Aaron Zagory kick), 10:22. Cardinal 35–21. Drive: 8 plays, 56 yards, 4:10.
- WASH – Ronnie Fouch 1-yard run (Ryan Perkins kick), 1:25. Cardinal 35–28. Drive: 14 plays, 95 yards, 3:34.

| Statistics | STAN | WASH |
|---|---|---|
| First downs | 21 | 27 |
| Total yards | 466 | 377 |
| Rushing yards | 244 | 140 |
| Passing yards | 222 | 237 |
| Turnovers | 1 | 1 |
| Time of possession | 28:50 | 31:10 |

| Team | Category | Player | Statistics |
|---|---|---|---|
| Stanford | Passing | Tavita Pritchard | 16/24, 222 yards, 3 TD |
| Stanford | Rushing | Anthony Kimble | 15 rushes, 157 yards, 2 TD |
| Stanford | Receiving | Ryan Whalen | 7 receptions, 76 yards, TD |
| Washington | Passing | Ronnie Fouch | 13/27, 186 yards, TD |
| Washington | Rushing | Jordan Polk | 2 rushes, 30 yards |
| Washington | Receiving | D'Andre Goodwin | 5 receptions, 83 yards |

The Huskies fell to 0–4 (0–2 in the Pac-10) with a 35–28 loss to Stanford, and also lost quarterback Jake Locker for the rest of the season when he broke his right thumb in the second quarter while blocking downfield.

Stanford quarterback Tavita Pritchard, formerly of Clover Park High School, completed 16 of 24 passes for 224 yards and three touchdowns with no interceptions.

The Huskies' defense gave up 466 yards – and 244 of those came on the ground, despite Washington's agreement all week that its top defensive priority was stopping the run.

The Huskies were trailing 14–7 when Locker was hurt, and while replacement Ronnie Fouch injected some enthusiasm with some accurate passing, the Dawgs ultimately couldn't overcome another porous performance from its defense.

Just about the time Locker emerged from the locker room in the third quarter, Stanford's Anthony Kimble ran 83 yards for a touchdown with 9:35 left in the third quarter to put Stanford ahead 28–14, and all hope seemed to be gone.

Willingham opened his postgame news conference by saying it was "very difficult for me to stand before you...I felt like we could win the football game."

=== At Arizona ===
Washington Huskies at Arizona Wildcats – Game summary

| Quarter | 1 | 2 | 3 | 4 | Total |
|---|---|---|---|---|---|
| Huskies | 0 | 7 | 0 | 7 | 14 |
| Wildcats | 17 | 14 | 17 | 0 | 48 |

at Arizona Stadium, Tucson, Arizona

- Date: October 4
- Game time: 4:30 p.m. PDT
- Game weather: Cloudy, 84 °F (29 °C)
- Game attendance: 55,624
- Referee: Michael Batlan
- TV: Versus
- Box score, Recap

Game information
First quarter
- ARIZ – Jason Bondzio 29-yard field goal, 10:47. Wildcats 3–0. Drive: 8 plays, 28 yards, 2:46.
- ARIZ – Rob Gronkowski 37-yard pass from Willie Tuitama (Jason Bondzio kick), 7:10. Wildcats 10–0. Drive: 2 plays, 40 yards, 0:24.
- ARIZ – Nic Grigsby 4-yard run (Jason Bondzio kick), 0:00. Wildcats 17–0. Drive: 6 plays, 72 yards, 3:15.

Second quarter

- WASH – Paul Homer 1-yard run (Ryan Perkins kick), 11:55. Wildcats 17–7. Drive: 7 plays, 81 yards, 3:05.
- ARIZ – Mike Thomas 48-yard punt return (Jason Bondzio kick), 8:13. Wildcats 24–7.
- ARIZ – Rob Gronkowski 9-yard pass from Willie Tuitama (Jason Bondzio kick), 3:58. Wildcats 31–7. Drive: 5 plays, 34 yards, 2:10.

Third quarter

- ARIZ – Rob Gronkowski 8-yard pass from Willie Tuitama (Jason Bondzio kick), 10:50. Wildcats 38–7. Drive: 8 plays, 75 yards, 4:08.
- ARIZ – Jason Bondzio 49-yard field goal, 5:42. Wildcats 41–7. Drive: 8 plays, 46 yards, 3:26.
- ARIZ – Xavier Smith 2-yard run (Jason Bondzio kick), 0:38. Wildcats 48–7. Drive: 6 plays, 70 yards, 2:46.

Fourth quarter

- WASH – Michael Gottlieb 20-yard pass from Ronnie Fouch (Ryan Perkins kick), 8:33. Wildcats 48–14. Drive: 7 plays, 43 yards, 1:50.

| Statistics | WASH | ARIZ |
|---|---|---|
| First downs | 12 | 28 |
| Total yards | 244 | 449 |
| Rushing yards | 63 | 256 |
| Passing yards | 181 | 193 |
| Turnovers | 2 | 0 |
| Time of possession | 23:48 | 36:07 |

| Team | Category | Player | Statistics |
|---|---|---|---|
| Washington | Passing | Ronnie Fouch | 12/28, 181 yards, TD, INT |
| Washington | Rushing | Brandon Johnson | 13 rushes, 35 yards |
| Washington | Receiving | Jermaine Kearse | 1 reception, 62 yards |
| Arizona | Passing | Willie Tuitama | 17/21, 193 yards, 3 TD |
| Arizona | Rushing | Nic Grigsby | 14 rushes, 113 yards, TD |
| Arizona | Receiving | Rob Gronkowski | 5 receptions, 109 yards, 3 TD |

On a breezy night in the Tucson desert, Arizona wasted little time putting away the Huskies. Arizona took a 17–0 lead after the first quarter and never looked back.

Facing the nation's second-ranked defense, Washington struggled behind quarterback Ronnie Fouch, a redshirt freshman making his first college start. Fouch completed 12 of 28 passes for 181 yards and one touchdown, a 20-yarder to Michael Gottlieb midway through the fourth quarter. Fouch also threw an interception.

"We played a complete game on offense, defense and special teams", Arizona coach Mike Stoops said. "We were very efficient and balanced. Our running backs were strong. (quarterback) Willie Tuitama was excellent."

It was the Huskies' fifth loss of the season and seventh straight dating back to last season, giving the Dawgs the dubious distinction of having the longest losing streak in major college football.

Washington athletic director Scott Woodward met with reporters after the game to say that he stands by the position he has held all along – he does not intend to fire head coach Tyrone Willingham midseason.

"I stick with what I said last week", he said. "I told you last week that I was less happy than I was the week before. Well, I'm even less happy than I was. But we have seven games, and we are going to play those seven games and no, there is not going to be a change this week. We will look at the whole body of work of the season and assess it at the end of the season."

=== Oregon State ===
Oregon State Beavers at Washington Huskies – Game summary

| Quarter | 1 | 2 | 3 | 4 | Total |
|---|---|---|---|---|---|
| Beavers | 7 | 10 | 7 | 10 | 34 |
| Huskies | 3 | 3 | 0 | 7 | 13 |

at Husky Stadium, Seattle, Washington

- Date: October 18
- Game time: 4:00 p.m. PDT
- Game weather: Sunny, 58 °F (14 °C)
- Game attendance: 63,996
- Referee: Brian O'Cain
- TV: Versus
- Box score, Recap

Game information
First quarter
- WASH – Jared Ballman 45-yard field goal, 4:54. Huskies 3–0. Drive: 8 plays, 66 yards, 4:31.
- ORST – James Rodgers 52-yard run (Justin Kahut kick), 2:23. Beavers 7–3. Drive: 5 plays, 66 yards, 2:24.

Second quarter

- ORST – Justin Kahut 37-yard field goal, 14:09. Beavers 10–3. Drive: 5 plays, 25 yards, 1:41.
- ORST – James Rodgers 33-yard pass from Lyle Moevao (Justin Kahut kick), 8:43. Beavers 17–3. Drive: 5 plays, 51 yards, 2:30.
- WASH – Jared Ballman 44-yard field goal, 0:25. Beavers 17–6. Drive: 6 plays, 47 yards, 0:50.

Third quarter

- ORST – Jacquizz Rodgers 1-yard run (Justin Kahut kick), 8:29. Beavers 24–6. Drive: 10 plays, 65 yards, 6:19.

Fourth quarter

- ORST – James Rodgers 55-yard run (Justin Kahut kick), 12:52. Beavers 31–6. Drive: 4 plays, 80 yards, 2:25.
- WASH – Terrance Dailey 49-yard run (Ryan Perkins kick), 11:59. Beavers 31–13. Drive: 3 plays, 73 yards, 0:43.
- ORST – Justin Kahut 23-yard field goal, 5:20. Beavers 34–13. Drive: 11 plays, 62 yards, 6:35.

| Statistics | ORST | WASH |
|---|---|---|
| First downs | 19 | 16 |
| Total yards | 421 | 377 |
| Rushing yards | 230 | 101 |
| Passing yards | 191 | 276 |
| Turnovers | 0 | 4 |
| Time of possession | 31:11 | 28:49 |

| Team | Category | Player | Statistics |
|---|---|---|---|
| Oregon State | Passing | Lyle Moevao | 18/22, 191 yards, TD |
| Oregon State | Rushing | James Rodgers | 3 rushes, 110 yards, 2 TD |
| Oregon State | Receiving | Shane Morales | 4 receptions, 61 yards |
| Washington | Passing | Ronnie Fouch | 17/32, 276 yards, 3 INT |
| Washington | Rushing | Terrance Dailey | 16 rushes, 102 yards, TD |
| Washington | Receiving | D'Andre Goodwin | 5 receptions, 136 yards |

Oregon State's James Rodgers zipped through Washington's defense for 216 all-purpose yards and three touchdowns as the Beavers won their fifth straight over Washington for the first time in the series' history.

James' brother, Jacquizz Rodgers, did his part too: 94 yards rushing on 20 carries and a touchdown.

The Beavers ran for 230 yards and the Huskies turned the ball over four times in front of a disappointed homecoming crowd at Husky Stadium. The biggest cheers of the night were for former Husky head coach Don James and the 1977 Washington team that won the Rose Bowl when they were honored on the field after the third quarter.

The Huskies dropped their eighth straight dating back to last season, tied with North Texas for the longest losing streak in the country.

Washington took a rare lead on Jared Ballman's 45-yard field goal early in the first quarter. The Huskies had not led since the third quarter against BYU on September 6, and it was only their second lead of the entire season.

With under 3 minutes to go in the first quarter, Oregon State coach Mike Riley took a chance by going for it on fourth-and-1 at his own 43, and converted with Jacquizz Rodgers going for five yards. On the next play, the Beavers faked a dive to Jacquizz and handed instead to James Rodgers on a reverse, then watched him dash in front of the Beavers' bench for a 52-yard touchdown.

Later in the half, after Fouch was sacked and fumbled near midfield, James Rodgers struck again. Rodgers found space in the middle of Washington interior on a middle screen, then sprinted away from three Huskies for a 33-yard scoring pass to make it 17–3.

The Huskies were 3 of 12 on 3rd down conversions.

=== Notre Dame ===
Notre Dame Fighting Irish at Washington Huskies – Game summary

| Quarter | 1 | 2 | 3 | 4 | Total |
|---|---|---|---|---|---|
| Fighting Irish | 14 | 3 | 10 | 6 | 33 |
| Huskies | 0 | 0 | 0 | 7 | 7 |

at Husky Stadium, Seattle, Washington

- Date: October 25
- Game time: 5:00 p.m. PDT
- Game weather: Sunny, 56 °F (13 °C)
- Game attendance: 70,437
- Referee: Jerry McGinn
- TV: ESPN2
- Box score, Recap

Game information
First quarter
- ND – Michael Floyd 51-yard pass from Jimmy Clausen (Brandon Walker kick), 12:35. Fighting Irish 7–0. Drive: 3 plays, 63 yards, 1:18.
- ND – Golden Tate 21-yard run (Brandon Walker kick), 7:48. Fighting Irish 14–0. Drive: 7 plays, 70 yards, 2:43.

Second quarter

- ND – Brandon Walker 28-yard field goal, 11:10. Fighting Irish 17–0. Drive: 5 plays, 15 yards, 1:12.

Third quarter

- ND – James Aldridge 4-yard run (Brandon Walker kick), 12:55. Fighting Irish 24–0. Drive: 5 plays, 61 yards, 1:57.
- ND – Brandon Walker 42-yard field goal, 4:31. Fighting Irish 27–0. Drive: 9 plays, 37 yards, 5:17.

Fourth quarter

- ND – James Aldridge 3-yard run (kick failed), 12:33. Fighting Irish 33–0. Drive: 10 plays, 60 yards, 5:23.
- WASH – D'Andre Goodwin 6-yard pass from Ronnie Fouch (Ryan Perkins kick), 2:56. Fighting Irish 33–7. Drive: 10 plays, 69 yards, 3:17.

| Statistics | ND | WASH |
|---|---|---|
| First downs | 25 | 9 |
| Total yards | 459 | 124 |
| Rushing yards | 252 | 26 |
| Passing yards | 207 | 98 |
| Turnovers | 1 | 0 |
| Time of possession | 37:28 | 22:32 |

| Team | Category | Player | Statistics |
|---|---|---|---|
| Notre Dame | Passing | Jimmy Clausen | 14/26, 201 yards, TD, INT |
| Notre Dame | Rushing | James Aldridge | 13 rushes, 84 yards, 2 TD |
| Notre Dame | Receiving | Michael Floyd | 4 receptions, 107 yards, TD |
| Washington | Passing | Ronnie Fouch | 11/25, 98 yards, TD |
| Washington | Rushing | Terrance Dailey | 8 rushes, 24 yards |
| Washington | Receiving | D'Andre Goodwin | 7 receptions, 47 yards, TD |

Washington's offense, with redshirt freshman quarterback Ronnie Fouch making his third career start, did not cross midfield until 6 minutes remained in the game. The Huskies had just 51 total yards on 35 plays entering the fourth quarter. They had 5 yards passing at halftime, when the game was essentially over with Notre Dame up 17–0.

"I feel like we could have scored more, but we never want to embarrass a team", said Notre Dame wide receiver Golden Tate, who ran 21 yards for his first career touchdown on an end around in the opening quarter. "I think we let up once we had them 14–0."

Washington finished with 124 total yards against a defense that was allowing an average of 368 yards, 75th nationally.

"There was nothing that we did well tonight", a solemn Willingham said after the game.

=== At No. 7 USC ===
Washington Huskies at No. 7 USC Trojans – Game summary

| Quarter | 1 | 2 | 3 | 4 | Total |
|---|---|---|---|---|---|
| Huskies | 0 | 0 | 0 | 0 | 0 |
| No. 7 Trojans | 21 | 21 | 7 | 7 | 56 |

at Los Angeles Memorial Coliseum, Los Angeles, California

- Date: November 1
- Game time: 3:30 p.m. PST
- Game weather: Light rain and cloudy, 73 °F (23 °C)
- Game attendance: 80,216
- Referee: Jack Wood
- TV: FSN
- Box score, Recap

Game information
First quarter
- USC – Patrick Turner 4-yard pass from Mark Sanchez (David Buehler kick), 10:14. Trojans 7–0. Drive: 9 plays, 57 yards, 3:28.
- USC – Patrick Turner 32-yard pass from Mark Sanchez (David Buehler kick), 4:29. Trojans 14–0. Drive: 7 plays, 66 yards, 3:28.
- USC – C. J. Gable 9-yard run (David Buehler kick), 3:31. Trojans 21–0. Drive: 2 plays, 33 yards, 0:30.

Second quarter

- USC – Mark Sanchez 1-yard run (David Buehler kick), 10:37. Trojans 28–0. Drive: 11 plays, 60 yards, 6:30.
- USC – Stafon Johnson 1-yard run (David Buehler kick), 9:06. Trojans 35–0. Drive: 2 plays, 16 yards, 0:37.
- USC – C. J. Gable 6-yard run (David Buehler kick), 3:04. Trojans 42–0. Drive: 9 plays, 71 yards, 3:21.

Third quarter

- USC – Broderick Green 5-yard run (David Buehler kick), 5:24. Trojans 49–0. Drive: 5 plays, 68 yards, 2:32.

Fourth quarter

- USC – Marc Tyler 6-yard run (David Buehler kick), 8:02. Trojans 56–0. Drive: 8 plays, 49 yards, 4:18.

| Statistics | WASH | USC |
|---|---|---|
| First downs | 15 | 25 |
| Total yards | 184 | 485 |
| Rushing yards | 71 | 297 |
| Passing yards | 113 | 188 |
| Turnovers | 3 | 0 |
| Time of possession | 29:04 | 30:56 |

| Team | Category | Player | Statistics |
|---|---|---|---|
| Washington | Passing | Ronnie Fouch | 14/33, 113 yards, 3 INT |
| Washington | Rushing | Brandon Johnson | 18 rushes, 54 yards |
| Washington | Receiving | D'Andre Goodwin | 5 receptions, 35 yards |
| USC | Passing | Mark Sanchez | 15/19, 167 yards, 2 TD |
| USC | Rushing | C. J. Gable | 10 rushes, 108 yards, 2 TD |
| USC | Receiving | Patrick Turner | 6 receptions, 100 yards, 2 TD |

Mark Sanchez completed 15 of 19 passes for 167 yards and two touchdowns to Patrick Turner before coming out early in the third quarter, and Southern California scored TDs on its first six possessions in a 56–0 rout of Washington.

USC led 42–0 at the half.

The win before a crowd of 80,216 at the Los Angeles Memorial Coliseum was the 42nd in the last 43 home games for the Trojans.

The victory was the most lopsided in the history of the 78-game series, surpassing USC's 48–0 triumph in 1929. The Trojans have won the last seven games between the teams, but their margin of victory was just six points in 2006 and three points last season.

Washington moved to the Trojans' 6-yard line early in the fourth quarter, but Chris Galippo intercepted a pass by Fouch on second-and-goal and returned it 50 yards to the Huskies' 49.

The Huskies would threaten again later, getting to the USC 25 before Drew McAllister's interception turned them away to preserve the shutout.

"It was exciting to see so many of our young guys get in and to hold onto the shutout there at the end", USC Head coach Pete Carroll said. "It's really a source of pride for everyone."

It was the Huskies' first shutout loss since falling to USC 38–0 in 2004, their worst loss since a 65–7 decision at Miami in 2001, and their worst shutout loss since a 58–0 beating at Oregon in 1973.

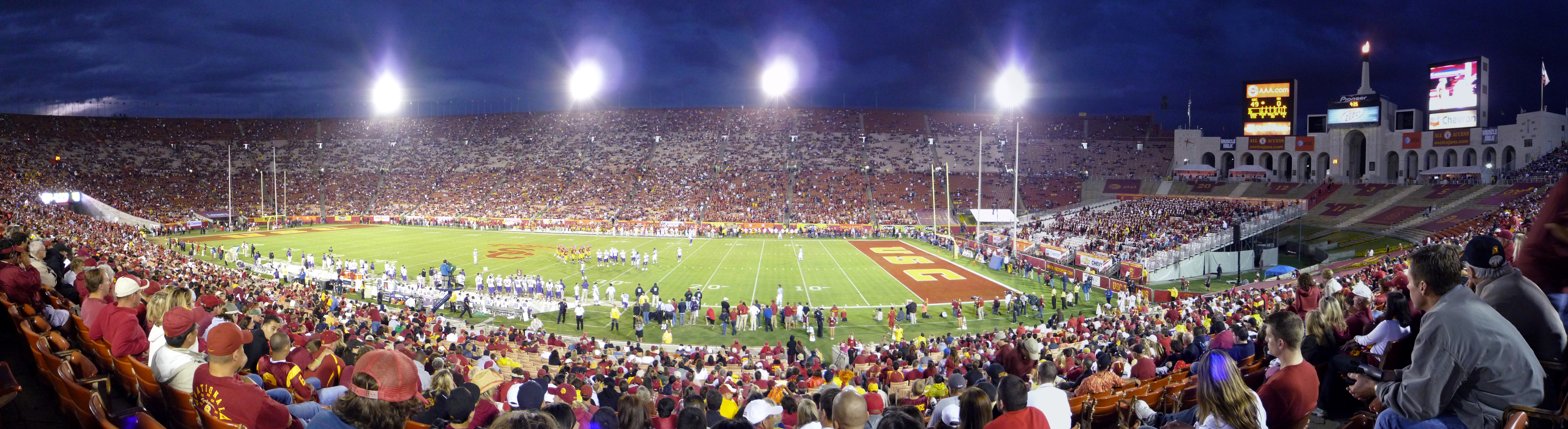
The fourth quarter of Washington's game against the USC Trojans in the Los Angeles Memorial Coliseum.

=== Arizona State ===
Arizona State Sun Devils at Washington Huskies – Game summary

| Quarter | 1 | 2 | 3 | 4 | Total |
|---|---|---|---|---|---|
| Sun Devils | 3 | 13 | 7 | 16 | 39 |
| Huskies | 3 | 10 | 6 | 0 | 19 |

at Husky Stadium, Seattle, Washington

- Date: November 8
- Game time: 4:00 p.m. PST
- Game weather: Overcast, 62 °F (17 °C)
- Game attendance: 57,013
- Referee: Jay Stricherz
- TV: FSNNW
- Box score, Recap

Game information
First quarter
- WASH – Ryan Perkins 34-yard field goal, 5:47. Huskies 3–0. Drive: 10 plays, 58 yards, 3:44.
- ASU – Thomas Weber 34-yard field goal, 2:27. Tied 3–3. Drive: 8 plays, 63 yards, 3:20.

Second quarter

- ASU – Troy Nolan 44-yard fumble return (Thomas Weber kick), 14:50. Sun Devils 10–3.
- WASH – Ronnie Fouch 6-yard pass from Cody Burns (Ryan Perkins kick), 12:01. Tied 10–10. Drive: 7 plays, 81 yards, 2:40.
- WASH – Ryan Perkins 38-yard field goal, 10:09. Huskies 13–10. Drive: 4 plays, 8 yards, 1:27.
- ASU – Thomas Weber 37-yard field goal, 1:02. Tied 13–13. Drive: 7 plays, 60 yards, 2:51.
- ASU – Thomas Weber 29-yard field goal, 0:03. Sun Devils 16–13. Drive: 4 plays, 25 yards, 0:19.

Third quarter

- WASH – Ryan Perkins 21-yard field goal, 12:01. Tied 16–16. Drive: 8 plays, 40 yards, 2:48.
- WASH – Ryan Perkins 20-yard field goal, 8:53. Huskies 19–16. Drive: 6 plays, 11 yards, 1:36.
- ASU – Michael Jones 6-yard pass from Rudy Carpenter (Thomas Weber kick), 2:33. Sun Devils 23–19. Drive: 8 plays, 41 yards, 3:42.

Fourth quarter

- ASU – Michael Jones 2-yard pass from Rudy Carpenter (Thomas Weber kick), 12:34. Sun Devils 30–19. Drive: 8 plays, 49 yards, 3:48.
- ASU – Keegan Herring 29-yard run (Thomas Weber kick), 6:46. Sun Devils 37–19. Drive: 7 plays, 51 yards, 3:36.
- ASU – Ronnie Fouch sacked in end zone, 5:52. Sun Devils 39–19.

| Statistics | ASU | WASH |
|---|---|---|
| First downs | 19 | 16 |
| Total yards | 400 | 279 |
| Rushing yards | 182 | 52 |
| Passing yards | 218 | 227 |
| Turnovers | 1 | 3 |
| Time of possession | 30:30 | 29:30 |

| Team | Category | Player | Statistics |
|---|---|---|---|
| Arizona State | Passing | Rudy Carpenter | 22/31, 218 yards, 2 TD |
| Arizona State | Rushing | Keegan Herring | 22 rushes, 144 yards, 2 TD |
| Arizona State | Receiving | Michael Jones | 11 receptions, 146 yards, 2 TD |
| Washington | Passing | Ronnie Fouch | 13/40, 192 yards, 2 INT |
| Washington | Rushing | Terrance Dailey | 14 rushes, 66 yards |
| Washington | Receiving | D'Andre Goodwin | 5 receptions, 99 yards |

Quarterback Rudy Carpenter rallied Arizona State with a pair of second half touchdowns to Michael Jones, and the Sun Devils kept their slim bowl hopes alive by pulling away for a 39–19 win over winless Washington on Saturday night in Seattle.

Washington opened the playbook in this game. The Huskies used reverses, direct snaps, and even a double pass that ended with quarterback Ronnie Fouch catching a second-quarter touchdown.

With the game tied at 16 in the third quarter, Washington's Chris Stevens blocked a punt and the Huskies took over at the Arizona State 14. But the Sun Devils defense held the Huskies to a second consecutive field goal inside the 10-yard line, and while it gave Washington a 19–16 lead, it would be the last points the Huskies scored.

Carpenter quickly led the Sun Devils down the field, capped by his 6-yard toss to Jones in the back of the end zone to give Arizona State a 23–19 lead. On their next possession, Carpenter hit Jones on a 2-yard fade to push the advantage to 30–19.

Carpenter hit seven straight passes during the two decisive scoring drives. He finished 22 of 31 for 218 yards.

Washington was 4–15 on 3rd down conversions, and ran for a meager 52 yards, 39 of which came on a late 4th quarter carry, after the game had already been decided.

Fouch finished 13 of 40 for 192 yards, with two interceptions.

The Huskies were held scoreless in the 4th quarter for the second consecutive game. The second half continues to be dreadful for the Dawgs: In the past 5 games, UW has managed to score a mere 27 second half points.

=== UCLA ===
UCLA Bruins at Washington Huskies – Game summary

| Quarter | 1 | 2 | 3 | 4 | Total |
|---|---|---|---|---|---|
| Bruins | 7 | 10 | 0 | 10 | 27 |
| Huskies | 7 | 0 | 0 | 0 | 7 |

at Husky Stadium, Seattle, Washington

- Date: November 15
- Game time: 7:15 p.m. PST
- Game weather: Mostly cloudy, 51 °F (11 °C)
- Game attendance: 59,738
- Referee: Larry Farina
- TV: FSN
- Box score, Recap

Game information
First quarter
- UCLA – Derrick Coleman 11-yard run (Kai Forbath kick), 8:53. Bruins 7–0. Drive: 12 plays, 80 yards, 6:07.
- WASH – Brandon Johnson 7-yard run (Ryan Perkins kick), 0:44. Tied 7–7. Drive: 2 plays, 11 yards, 0:39.

Second quarter

- UCLA – Kahlil Bell 1-yard run (Kai Forbath kick), 11:57. Bruins 14–7. Drive: 4 plays, 31 yards, 1:33.
- UCLA – Kai Forbath 49-yard field goal, 4:53. Bruins 17–7. Drive: 5 plays, 17 yards, 2:32.

Third quarter

- No scoring plays

Fourth quarter

- UCLA – Kahlil Bell 1-yard run (Kai Forbath kick), 14:56. Bruins 24–7. Drive: 15 plays, 92 yards, 8:12.
- UCLA – Kai Forbath 18-yard field goal, 9:36. Bruins 27–7. Drive: 10 plays, 37 yards, 3:55.

| Statistics | UCLA | WASH |
|---|---|---|
| First downs | 20 | 10 |
| Total yards | 292 | 135 |
| Rushing yards | 157 | 96 |
| Passing yards | 135 | 39 |
| Turnovers | 3 | 5 |
| Time of possession | 36:52 | 23:08 |

| Team | Category | Player | Statistics |
|---|---|---|---|
| UCLA | Passing | Kevin Craft | 13/22, 135 yards, 3 INT |
| UCLA | Rushing | Kahlil Bell | 25 rushes, 97 yards, 2 TD |
| UCLA | Receiving | Ryan Moya | 3 receptions, 38 yards |
| Washington | Passing | Ronnie Fouch | 7/22, 39 yards, 2 INT |
| Washington | Rushing | Brandon Johnson | 20 rushes, 75 yards, TD |
| Washington | Receiving | Devin Aguilar | 1 reception, 13 yards |

Huskies head coach Tyrone Willingham already had been fired from his position. On October 27, 2008, the University of Washington announced that he will not be retained as head coach after the completion of Washington's 2008 football season. Willingham becomes the third Washington coach to be fired (out of the last four) since Hall of Fame coach Don James resigned in 1993 because of pending NCAA and Pac-10 sanctions against his team where his players were determined to have "accepted substantial and illegal benefits under James, likely with his knowledge".

UCLA coach Neuheisel had been fired in the summer of 2003 from the University of Washington in relation to his participation in a neighborhood pool for the 2003 NCAA Division I men's basketball tournament and lies he told about his actions. The University of Washington had its probation extended for failing to monitor its football program. This was Neuheisel's first return to Husky Stadium following the firing. There was some booing, but not a significant amount. The Huskies had been on a winless streak all season, and were at 0–9.

The day was sunny and dry, so weather was not a factor as can often be the case in Seattle in November. Under the direction of quarterback Kevin Craft, the Bruins drove 80 yards in 12 plays. Running back Derrick Coleman rushed for a touchdown in the first half. In the second half, the Bruins launched a ninety-two-yard drive. Backed up against the goal line, running back Kahlil Bell ran four straight times, and Craft followed with several key pass completions. UCLA finally scored on a run by Bell, taking the 24–7 lead.

=== At Washington State ===
Washington Huskies at Washington State Cougars – Game summary

| Quarter | 1 | 2 | 3 | 4 | OT | 2OT | Total |
|---|---|---|---|---|---|---|---|
| Huskies | 0 | 10 | 0 | 0 | 3 | 0 | 13 |
| Cougars | 0 | 0 | 7 | 3 | 3 | 3 | 16 |

at Martin Stadium, Pullman, Washington

- Date: November 22
- Game time: 12:00 p.m. PST
- Game attendance: 32,211
- Referee: Michael Batlan
- TV: FSN
- Box score, Recap

Game information
First quarter
- No scoring plays

Second quarter

- WASH – Willie Griffin 3-yard run (Ryan Perkins kick), 12:17. Huskies 7–0. Drive: 9 plays, 60 yards, 4:08.
- WASH – Ryan Perkins 35-yard field goal, 5:07. Huskies 10–0. Drive: 6 plays, 18 yards, 2:35.

Third quarter

- WSU – Logwone Mitz 57-yard run (Nico Grasu kick), 2:56. Huskies 10–7. Drive: 7 plays, 86 yards, 3:45.

Fourth quarter

- WSU – Nico Grasu 28-yard field goal, 0:00. Tied 10–10. Drive: 7 plays, 69 yards, 0:56.

Overtime

- WSU – Nico Grasu 19-yard field goal. Cougars 13–10. Drive: 11 plays, 23 yards.
- WASH – Ryan Perkins 22-yard field goal. Tied 13–13. Drive: 6 plays, 20 yards.

Second overtime

- WSU – Nico Grasu 37-yard field goal. Cougars 16–13. Drive: 4 plays, 5 yards.

| Statistics | WASH | WSU |
|---|---|---|
| First downs | 20 | 15 |
| Total yards | 323 | 338 |
| Rushing yards | 224 | 171 |
| Passing yards | 99 | 167 |
| Turnovers | 1 | 1 |
| Time of possession | 35:26 | 24:34 |

| Team | Category | Player | Statistics |
|---|---|---|---|
| Washington | Passing | Ronnie Fouch | 11/16, 99 yards, INT |
| Washington | Rushing | Willie Griffin | 26 rushes, 112 yards, TD |
| Washington | Receiving | Michael Gottlieb | 4 receptions, 49 yards |
| Washington State | Passing | Kevin Lopina | 17/29, 167 yards, INT |
| Washington State | Rushing | Dwight Tardy | 19 rushes, 75 yards |
| Washington State | Receiving | Jared Karstetter | 2 receptions, 55 yards |

On November 21, 2008, the 1–10 Washington State Cougars met the 0–10 Huskies in Pullman for the 101st Apple Cup. The media joked that the game was the "Crapple Cup" and "full of worms". The Huskies led for most of the game, until the Cougars forced their way into overtime with a fourth-quarter field goal by kicker Nico Grasu. Grasu hit two more field goals in the two overtime periods to lead the Cougars to their second straight Apple Cup victory, and fourth win in the teams' last five meetings. The win was the Cougars' lone victory over a Football Bowl Subdivision team in 2008 and assured the Huskies' place at the bottom of the Pac-10 standings.

=== California ===
Washington Huskies at California Golden Bears – Game summary

| Quarter | 1 | 2 | 3 | 4 | Total |
|---|---|---|---|---|---|
| Huskies | 0 | 0 | 7 | 0 | 7 |
| Golden Bears | 10 | 21 | 14 | 3 | 48 |

at California Memorial Stadium, Berkeley, California

- Date: December 6
- Game time: 12:00 p.m. PST
- Game weather: Clear, 52 °F (11 °C)
- Game attendance: 50,038
- Referee: J. Folliard
- TV: FSN
- Box score, Recap

Game information
First quarter
- CAL – Jahvid Best 60-yard run (Giorgio Tavecchio kick), 12:40. Golden Bears 7–0. Drive: 2 plays, 62 yards, 0:53.
- CAL – Giorgio Tavecchio 23-yard field goal, 1:22. Golden Bears 10–0. Drive: 4 plays, 6 yards, 1:15.

Second quarter

- CAL – Jahvid Best 1-yard run (Giorgio Tavecchio kick), 8:57. Golden Bears 17–0. Drive: 2 plays, 8 yards, 0:43.
- CAL – Jahvid Best 20-yard run (Giorgio Tavecchio kick), 7:00. Golden Bears 24–0. Drive: 3 plays, 57 yards, 1:08.
- CAL – Cameron Morrah 6-yard pass from Nate Longshore (Giorgio Tavecchio kick), 0:05. Golden Bears 31–0. Drive: 5 plays, 89 yards, 0:28.

Third quarter

- CAL – Jahvid Best 84-yard run (Giorgio Tavecchio kick), 13:57. Golden Bears 38–0. Drive: 2 plays, 83 yards, 0:58.
- CAL – Shane Vereen 2-yard run (Giorgio Tavecchio kick), 9:49. Golden Bears 45–0. Drive: 6 plays, 69 yards, 1:54.
- WASH – Taylor Bean 2-yard run (Ryan Perkins kick), 2:50. Golden Bears 45–7. Drive: 15 plays, 65 yards, 6:53.

Fourth quarter

- CAL – Jordan Kay 36-yard field goal, 11:33. Golden Bears 48–7. Drive: 5 plays, 16 yards, 2:20.

| Statistics | WASH | CAL |
|---|---|---|
| First downs | 12 | 20 |
| Total yards | 200 | 459 |
| Rushing yards | 104 | 431 |
| Passing yards | 96 | 118 |
| Turnovers | 4 | 0 |
| Time of possession | 29:50 | 30:10 |

| Team | Category | Player | Statistics |
|---|---|---|---|
| Washington | Passing | Taylor Bean | 8/17, 80 yards, INT |
| Washington | Rushing | Willie Griffin | 24 rushes, 60 yards |
| Washington | Receiving | Charles Hawkins Jr. | 2 receptions, 43 yards |
| California | Passing | Nate Longshore | 5/10, 84 yards, TD |
| California | Rushing | Jahvid Best | 19 rushes, 311 yards, 4 TD |
| California | Receiving | Cameron Morrah | 3 receptions, 39 yards, TD |

The Bears' victory made their record at home a perfect 7–0 and made the Huskies the first 0–12 team in PAC-10 conference history and the only team in the country to finish the 2008 season without a victory. During the game Cal running back Jahvid Best set a school record for most rushing yards in a game at 311. The Huskies finished the season on a 14-game losing streak, as the team's last win had been against Cal at home in 2007.
