= Jerry Hughes =

American football player (born 1988)

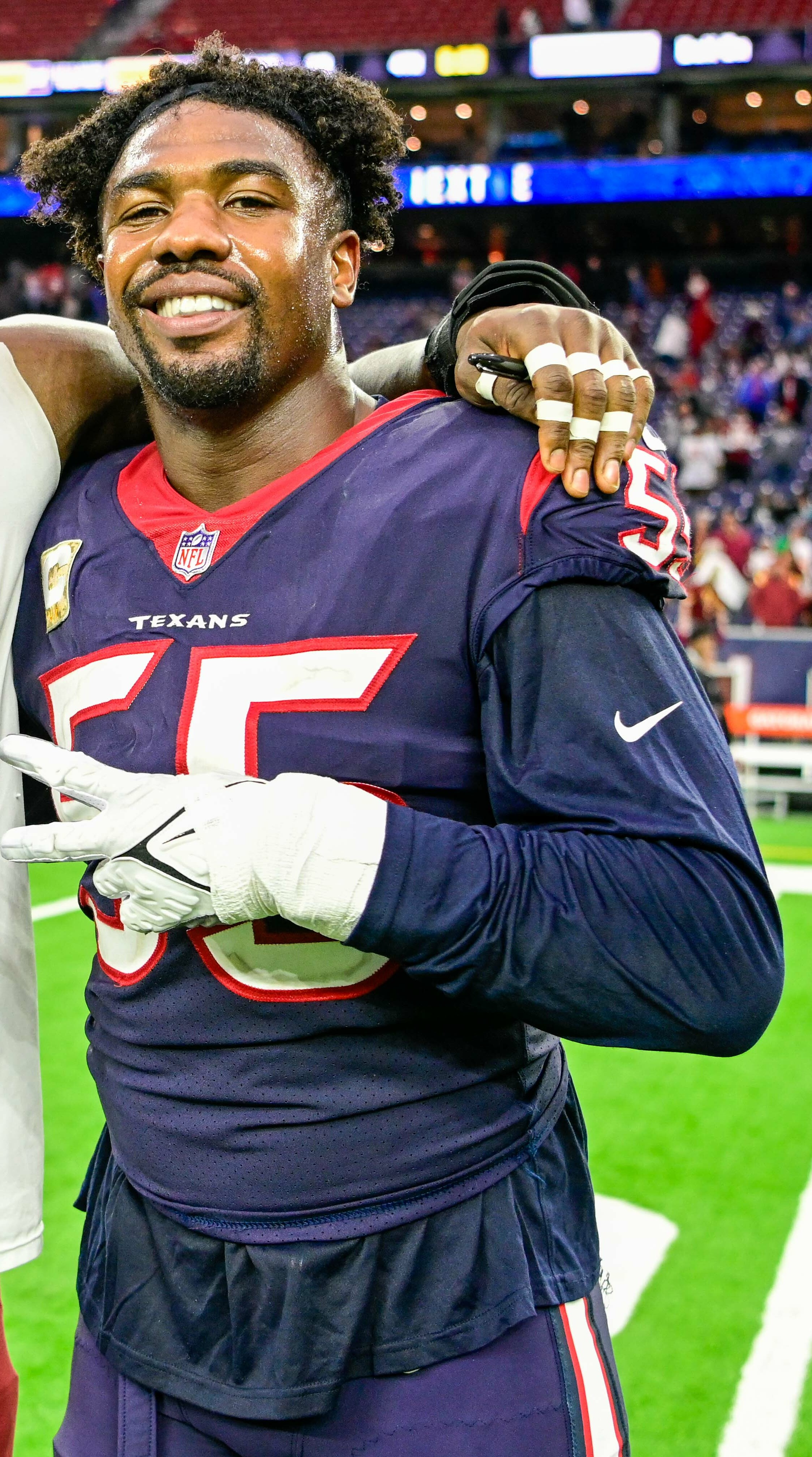
- Hughes with the Houston Texans in 2022

Profile
- Position: Defensive end

Personal information
- Born: August 13, 1988 (age 38); Sugar Land, Texas, U.S.
- Listed height: 6 ft 2 in (1.88 m)
- Listed weight: 254 lb (115 kg)

Career information
- High school: Stephen F. Austin (Sugar Land)
- College: TCU (2006–2009)
- NFL draft: 2010: 1st round, 31st overall pick

Career history
- Indianapolis Colts (2010–2012); Buffalo Bills (2013–2021); Houston Texans (2022–2024)

Awards and highlights
- Ted Hendricks Award (2009); Lott Trophy (2009); Unanimous All-American (2009); Consensus All-American (2008); 2× MW Defensive Player of the Year (2008, 2009); 2× First-team All-MW (2008, 2009)

Career NFL statistics
- Total tackles: 484
- Sacks: 70
- Forced fumbles: 19
- Fumble recoveries: 5
- Pass deflections: 21
- Interceptions: 2
- Defensive touchdowns: 2
- Stats at Pro Football Reference

Jerry Ray Hughes Jr. (born August 13, 1988) is an American professional football defensive end. He played college football for the TCU Horned Frogs, where he was twice recognized as a consensus All-American before being selected by the Indianapolis Colts in the first round of the 2010 NFL draft. Hughes has also played for the Buffalo Bills, with whom he has played the majority of his pro career, and the Houston Texans.

== Early life ==
Hughes received three varsity letters in football while attending Austin High School in Fort Bend County, Texas, where he played running back. As a senior in 2006, Hughes rushed for 1,412 yards and totaled 19 touchdowns to capture First-team All-District 20-5A honors. Hughes also earned First-team All-District as a kick returner. Hughes also lettered in baseball where he played third base and pitcher.

Considered only a two-star recruit out of high-school by recruiting service Rivals.com, Hughes failed to draw a lot of attention and only received a few scholarship offers. He picked TCU over Iowa State, Arizona State and North Texas.

== College career ==
Hughes accepted an athletic scholarship to attend Texas Christian University, and played for coach Gary Patterson's TCU Horned Frogs football team from 2006 to 2009. Patterson recognized Hughes' natural athleticism and assigned him jersey number 98, usually reserved for defensive linemen. Before the season, Patterson worked Hughes in at defensive end, and he was able to earn playing time there as a freshman.

Once at TCU, Hughes was one of just four true freshmen to play for the Horned Frogs in 2006. He recorded his first career sack in a 31–17 win over Army. He played in all 13 games as sophomore in 2007, and recorded at least one tackle in each of those contests.

Taking over as a full-time starter as a junior in 2008, Hughes recorded 15 sacks, 18.5 tackles for a loss, 6 forced fumbles, 2 interceptions and returned one of those picks for a touchdown. He led the nation with his 15 sacks. He garnered first-team All-Mountain West Conference (MWC) and MWC Defensive Player of the Year honors, and was recognized as a consensus first-team All-American.

In 2009 Hughes had a career-high 54 tackles and 11.5 sacks (tied for 7th in NCAA). That season, the Horned Frogs ranked first in total defense, allowing just 233 yards per game and were sixth in the nation with 12.4 points allowed per game. He was a first-team All-Mountain West selection again, and was recognized as a unanimous first-team All-American. Additionally, he was named the MWC Defensive Player of the Year for the second time in two years.

His career totals now include 28.5 sacks, 139 total tackles, 39 tackles-for-loss and seven forced fumbles. Hughes earned his bachelor's degree in communications from TCU in 2010.

=== Awards and honors ===
- Consensus first-team All-American – Football Writers Association of America, The Sporting News, Walter Camp Football Foundation, CBS Sports, College Football News, ESPN, Rivals.com, and Sports Illustrated (2008)
- Unanimous first-team All-American – Associated Press, American Football Coaches Association, Football Writers Association of America, The Sporting News, Walter Camp Football Foundation, CBS Sports (2009)
- Ted Hendricks Award (2009)
- Lott Trophy (2009)
- Lombardi Award finalist (2009)
- Bronko Nagurski Trophy finalist (2008, 2009)

== Professional career ==
Pre-draft measurables
Height	Weight	Arm length	Hand span	40-yard dash	10-yard split	20-yard split	20-yard shuttle	Three-cone drill	Vertical jump	Broad jump	Bench press
6 ft 1 3/4 in (1.87 m)	255 lb (116 kg)	33 in (0.84 m)	9 3/4 in (0.25 m)	4.69 s	1.67 s	2.75 s	4.15 s	6.99 s	34.5 in (0.88 m)	9 ft 10 in (3.00 m)	26 reps
All values from NFL Combine

=== Indianapolis Colts ===
Hughes was selected in the first round by the Indianapolis Colts 31st overall in the 2010 NFL Draft. He is the first TCU Horned Frog selected in the first round of an NFL Draft since LaDainian Tomlinson went fifth overall to the San Diego Chargers in the 2001 NFL draft, and the first TCU defensive player selected in the first round since Bob Lilly, who was selected 13th overall by the Dallas Cowboys in the 1961 NFL draft. During his rookie season, Hughes appeared in 12 games making six tackles.

In 2011, Hughes appeared in 12 games with one start making 13 tackles and one sack.

On November 16, 2012, Hughes was fined $21,000 for a late hit against the Jacksonville Jaguars in Week 10. He finished the 2012 season by appearing in all 16 games with six starts recording 32 tackles, one pass defended, and four sacks.

=== Buffalo Bills ===
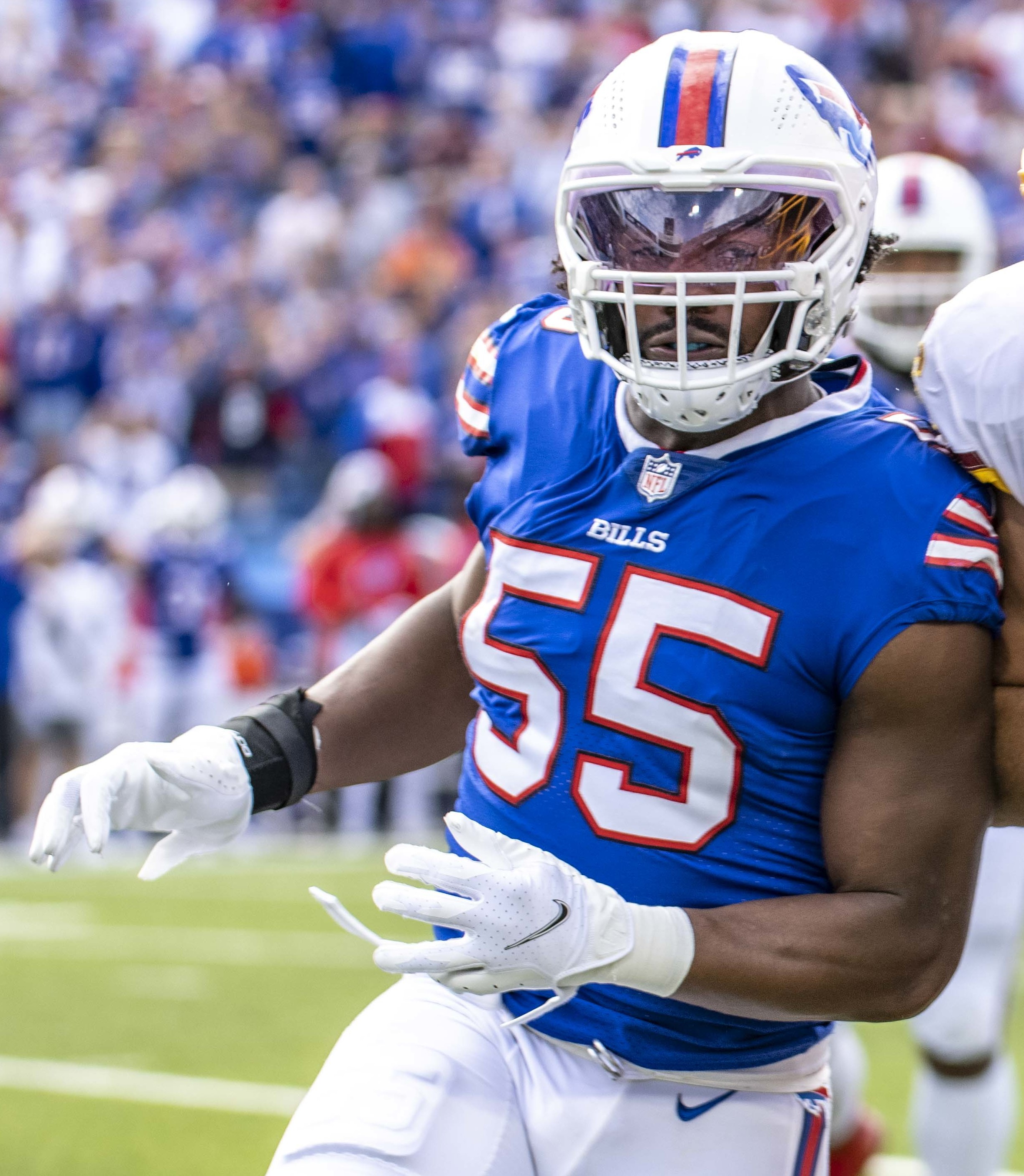
Hughes with the Buffalo Bills in 2021

On April 29, 2013, the Colts traded Hughes to the Buffalo Bills for linebacker Kelvin Sheppard. Hughes finished his first season with the Bills by making 46 tackles, 10 sacks and two forced fumbles in 16 games with one start. He was also named to the USA Today All-Joe Team.

On March 9, 2015, the Buffalo Bills and Hughes agreed to a five-year contract worth at least $45 million. He played through the majority of the 2015 season with a chipped bone in his left wrist as a hybrid LB/DE . In 2016, as the Bills more fully committed to a 3-4 scheme, Hughes was moved from defensive end to outside linebacker.

On May 21, 2019, Hughes signed a two-year contract extension with the Bills. In the AFC wild card game against the Houston Texans, Hughes sacked quarterback Deshaun Watson 3 times during the 22–19 overtime loss.

In Week 7 of the 2020 season against the New York Jets, Hughes recorded six tackles, two sacks, a forced fumble, and the game sealing interception late in the fourth quarter during the 18–10 win, earning AFC Defensive Player of the Week. In Week 15 against the Denver Broncos, Hughes recovered a fumble forced by teammate Tre'Davious White on Drew Lock and returned it for a 21 yard touchdown during the 48–19 win. In the Divisional Round of the playoffs against the Baltimore Ravens, Hughes recorded two sacks on Lamar Jackson during the 17–3 win. In the AFC Championship against the Kansas City Chiefs, Hughes recorded one sack on Patrick Mahomes during the 38–24 loss.

By the 2021 season, Hughes became the longest tenured player on the Bills' roster. A free agent after the season, he finished his 9-year tenure with Buffalo having amassed 53 sacks, ranking 4th in team history at the time.

=== Houston Texans ===
On May 11, 2022, Hughes signed with the Texans. He started 16 games and led the team with nine sacks. He returned in 2023 to record 32 tackles and three sacks in 17 games and two starts.

On July 9, 2024, Hughes re-signed with the Texans after initially entering free agency.

== NFL career statistics ==
=== Regular season ===
Year	Team	Games		Tackles					Fumbles				Interceptions					
Year	Team	GP	GS	Cmb	Solo	Ast	TfL	Sck	FF	FR	Yds	TD	Int	Yds	Avg	Lng	TD	PD
2010	IND	12	0	6	6	0	1	0.0	0	0	0	0	0	0	0.0	0	0	0
2011	IND	12	1	15	6	9	0	1.0	0	0	0	0	0	0	0.0	0	0	0
2012	IND	16	6	41	29	12	7	4.0	0	0	0	0	0	0	0.0	0	0	1
2013	BUF	16	1	46	32	14	9	10.0	2	0	0	0	0	0	0.0	0	0	2
2014	BUF	16	16	53	36	17	13	10.0	3	1	18	1	0	0	0.0	0	0	0
2015	BUF	16	16	52	37	15	8	5.0	2	1	2	0	0	0	0.0	0	0	4
2016	BUF	16	15	48	31	17	8	6.0	1	0	0	0	0	0	0.0	0	0	3
2017	BUF	16	16	44	28	16	12	5.0	1	0	0	0	0	0	0.0	0	0	0
2018	BUF	16	16	37	30	7	13	7.0	3	0	0	0	0	0	0.0	0	0	1
2019	BUF	16	16	23	14	9	6	4.5	0	1	11	0	0	0	0.0	0	0	3
2020	BUF	15	15	29	19	10	4	4.5	2	2	21	1	1	-3	-3.0	-3	0	3
2021	BUF	17	16	18	8	10	1	2.0	2	0	0	0	0	0	0.0	0	0	3
2022	HOU	17	16	35	21	14	10	9.0	2	0	0	0	1	14	14.0	14	0	1
2023	HOU	17	2	32	23	9	4	3.0	1	0	0	0	0	0	0.0	0	0	0
Career		218	152	479	320	159	96	70.0	19	5	52	2	2	11	5.5	14	0	21

=== Postseason ===
Year	Team	Games		Tackles					Fumbles				Interceptions				
Year	Team	GP	GS	Cmb	Solo	Ast	TfL	Sck	FF	FR	Yds	TD	Int	Yds	Avg	TD	PD
2010	IND	1	0	0	0	0	0	0.0	0	0	0	0	0	0	0.0	0	0
2012	IND	1	0	1	1	0	0	0.0	0	0	0	0	0	0	0.0	0	0
2017	BUF	1	1	3	1	2	0	0.0	0	0	0	0	0	0	0.0	0	0
2019	BUF	1	1	4	3	1	3	3.0	0	0	0	0	0	0	0.0	0	0
2020	BUF	3	3	6	5	1	3	3.0	0	0	0	0	0	0	0.0	0	0
2021	BUF	2	2	1	1	0	1	1.0	0	0	0	0	0	0	0.0	0	0
Career		9	7	15	11	4	7	7.0	0	0	0	0	0	0	0.0	0	0

== Personal life ==
Jerry married his High School sweetheart, Meghan Robinson in April 2015. and have four children: JR, Hayden, Jack, and Holt Hughes.
