= Ronnie Fouch =

American football player and coach (born 1989)

Coastal Carolina Chanticleers
- Title: Tight ends coach

Personal information
- Born: May 30, 1989 (age 37); Redlands, California, U.S.
- Listed height: 6 ft 2 in (1.88 m)
- Listed weight: 205 lb (93 kg)

Career information
- High school: Redlands East Valley
- College: Washington, Indiana State
- NFL draft: 2012: undrafted

Career history
- Georgia State (2013–2014) Graduate assistant; Louisville (2015–2018) Offensive quality control; Salt Lake Stallions (2019 (Spring)) Quarterbacks coach; Florida Tech (2019 (Fall)) Tight ends coach; Missouri State (2020–2023) Co-special teams coach & running backs coach; Arkansas (2024–2025) Wide receivers coach; Coastal Carolina (2026–present) Tight ends coach

Ronald Kainoa Fouch is an American football coach and former quarterback. He is currently the tight ends coach for the Coastal Carolina Chanticleers. He played college football for three years at the University of Washington and then transferred to Indiana State University.

== High school ==
Fouch was ranked as the #44 quarterback during his senior year by Scout.com and as the #21 pro-style QB prospect by Rivals.com.

== College career ==
=== Washington ===
Fouch attended the University of Washington for 3 years. While at Washington he started 8 of 12 games in the 2008 season, throwing for 1,339 yards, 4 touchdowns, and 13 interceptions. He also managed to record a reception for a touchdown in a losing game against Arizona State.

=== Indiana State ===
Fouch decided to transfer to ISU in January 2010 in order to receive more playing time. While playing for the Indiana State Sycamores, Fouch started 22 games, completing 322 of 544 attempted passes, for 4,316 yards and 38 touchdowns and only 15 interceptions. The team finished with consecutive overall records of 6 wins and 5 losses, and Fouch was credited with playing a significant role in an overtime victory against Missouri State and with leading the Sycamores to their finest offensive season on record. Indiana State spent most of the 2011 season ranked in the Top 25 due to Fouch's leadership.

== Post-college career ==
In 2012, Fouch tried out for the Chicago Bears, but was not signed. He eventually became a graduate assistant at Georgia State University with his former head coach Trent Miles from 2013–2014.

In October 2018, Fouch became the quarterbacks coach for the Salt Lake Stallions of the Alliance of American Football.
