= D'Andre Goodwin =

American football player and coach (born 1987)

No. 11, 16
- Position: Wide receiver

Personal information
- Born: December 26, 1987 (age 38); Lancaster, California, U.S.
- Listed height: 5 ft 11 in (1.80 m)
- Listed weight: 188 lb (85 kg)

Career information
- High school: Antelope Valley (Lancaster, California)
- College: Washington

Career history
- Denver Broncos (2011)
- Stats at Pro Football Reference

D'Andre Goodwin is an American former professional football player who was a wide receiver for the Denver Broncos of the National Football League (NFL) He played college football for the Washington Huskies. Goodwin played one game for the Broncos in the 2011–12 NFL playoffs. He became an assistant college football coach.

== Playing career ==
Goodwin played football at Antelope Valley High School and at the University of Washington.

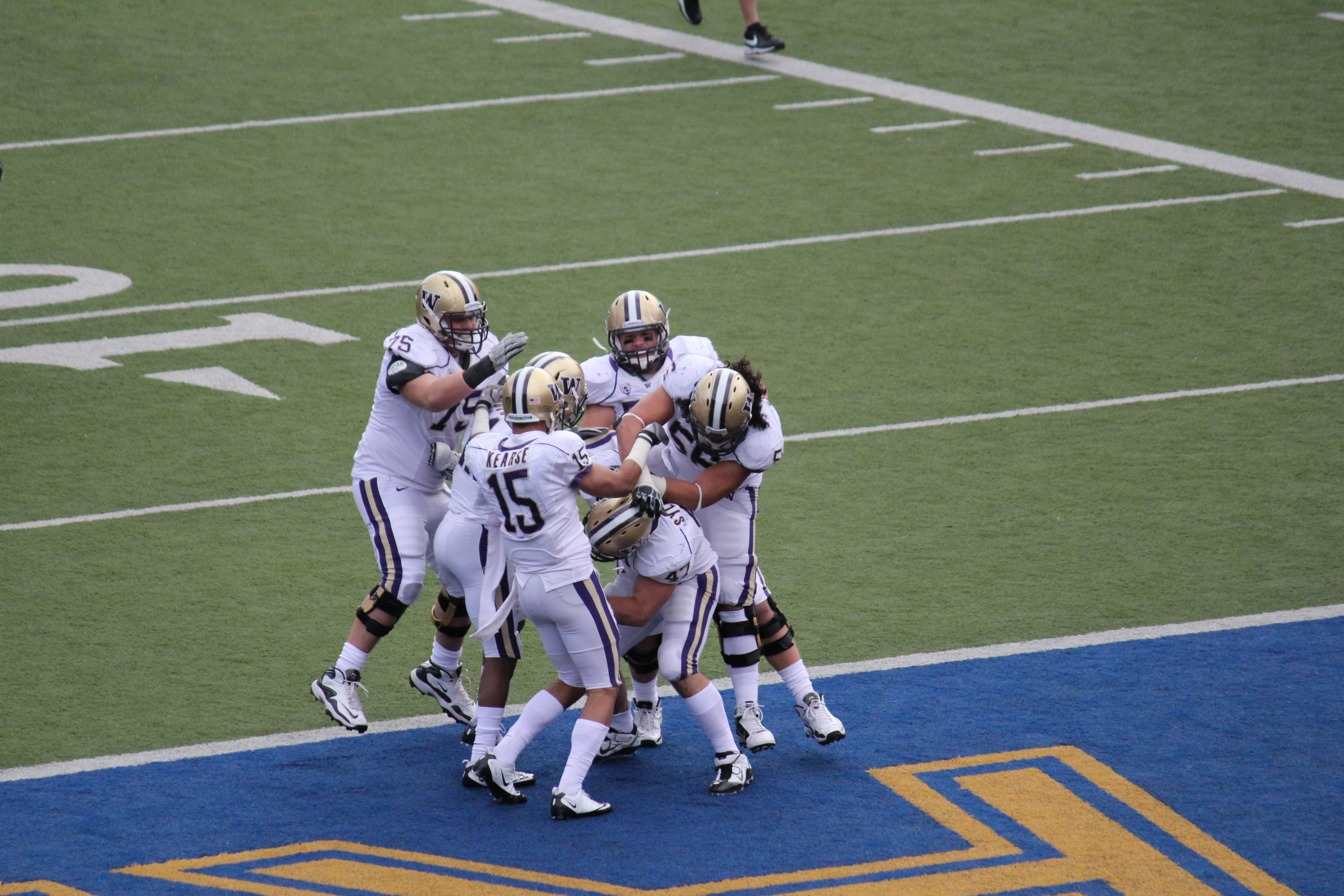
Goodwin celebrating with his teammates after he scored a touchdown for the University of Washington

On January 14, 2012, Goodwin played in the 2011–12 NFL playoffs for the Denver Broncos in their divisional round game against the New England Patriots. The Broncos lost the game 45–10, and were thus eliminated from the playoffs. This was Goodwin's only NFL playoff appearance and he never saw action during an NFL regular season game.

== Coaching career ==
Goodwin is currently the wide receivers coach for the football program at the College of Idaho.

== See also ==
- 2011 Denver Broncos season
