= Duck Dynasty: The Revival =

- Genre: Reality television Christian media
- Developed by: A&E Networks
- Starring: Willie Robertson; Si Robertson; Jase Robertson; Jep Robertson; Kay Robertson; Korie Robertson; Sadie Robertson Huff; John Luke Robertson; Bella Robertson Mayo; Rebecca Robertson Loflin; Willie Robertson, Jr; Christian Huff; Mary Kate Robertson; Jacob Mayo; John Reed Loflin; Abby Robertson; Justin Martin; John Godwin
- Opening theme: "Wanna Go Fast" by Alexza, HUSH & V-Notes
- Country of origin: United States
- Original language: English
- No. of seasons: 2
- No. of episodes: 20

Production
- Executive producers: Willie Robertson; Korie Robertson; John Luke Robertson; Zach Dasher; Brent Montgomery; Jeff Conroy; Courtney White; Will Nothacker; Gardner Reed
- Producers: Annie Taylor; Tony Sam
- Production locations: Monroe and West Monroe, Louisiana
- Production companies: Tread Lively Productions; Spoke Studios

Original release
- Network: A&E
- Release: June 1, 2025 – present

Related
- Duck Commander series Duck Dynasty; Duck Family Treasure; Jep & Jessica: Growing the Dynasty; At Home with the Robertsons; Going Si-ral

Duck Dynasty: The Revival is an American reality television series on A&E which premiered on June 1, 2025. It is a sequel to the popular Duck Dynasty series which was produced from 2012 to 2017 and inspired multiple spin-offs on A&E and other networks. It also airs on TV5 in the Philippines where the series has a cult following.

The new series centers on Willie Robertson and Korie Robertson, their adult children (including Sadie Robertson and John Luke Robertson), and their grandchildren in Louisiana. According to the A&E logline, "With their dynasty expanding into more than just ducks, Willie and Korie will bring their signature humor and family fun as they grapple with mapping out the future of Duck Commander, watching the kids navigate marriage, children and businesses of their own, and passing down the family legacy." Other members of the family who were featured prominently on the original series will be part of the new one, including Kay Robertson, Si Robertson, and others. Phil Robertson, who was diagnosed with Alzheimer's disease in 2024 and died on May 25, 2025, will not be featured.

The series is produced by Wheelhouse Entertainment's Spoke Studios and Tread Lively Productions, which was founded by Willie and Korie Robertson. Two ten-episode seasons have been ordered.

== Episodes ==
=== Season 1 (2025) ===
No. overall	No. in season	Title	Original release date	US viewers (millions)
1	1	"The Robertsons Are Back"	June 1, 2025	N/A
2	2	"Grandaddy Day Care"	June 8, 2025	N/A
3	3	"Si-Squatch"	June 15, 2025	N/A
4	4	"Vintage Willie"	June 22, 2025	N/A
5	5	"Chicken Chaos"	June 29, 2025	N/A
6	6	"Country Stars & Squirrels"	July 6, 2025	N/A
7	7	"Alone in the Woods"	July 13, 2025	N/A
8	8	"Duck's Got Talent?"	July 20, 2025	N/A
9	9	"Si's Unfortunate Advice"	July 27, 2025	N/A
10	10	"Shoot My Shot, or Not"	August 3, 2025	N/A
