= The Blind (film) =

- Theatrical release poster
- Directed by: Andrew Hyatt
- Screenplay by: Stephanie Katz; Andrew Hyatt
- Story by: Zach Dasher
- Produced by: Zach Dasher; Korie Robertson; Bob Katz; Brittany Yost; Cole Prine
- Starring: Aron von Andrian; Amelia Eve; Connor Tillman; John Ales; Kerry Knuppe
- Cinematography: Chris Stacey
- Edited by: John Lange
- Music by: Sean Philip Johnson
- Production companies: The Blind Production LLC; Tread Lively; Stacey Films; GND Media Group
- Distributed by: Fathom Events
- Release date: September 28, 2023
- Running time: 108 minutes
- Country: United States
- Language: English
- Box office: $17.3 million

The Blind (also known as The Blind: The True Story of the Robertson Family) is a 2023 American Christian biographical drama film directed by Andrew Hyatt, who co-wrote the screenplay with Stephanie Katz. The film details the life and marriage of Duck Commander's Phil Robertson and Kay Robertson and their family until 1985, long before their Duck Dynasty fame.

== Cast ==
- Aron von Andrian as Phil Robertson
  - Ronan Carroll as Phil, age 12
  - Matthew Erick White as Phil, age 17
- Amelia Eve as Kay Robertson (née Carroway)
  - Scarlett Abinante as Kay, age 11
  - Brielle Robillard as Kay, age 16
- Connor Tillman as Big Al Bolen
- John Ales as Pastor Bill Smith
- Kerry Knuppe as Merritt Robertson
- Aaron Dalla Villa as Si Robertson
  - Brasher Russell as Si, age 10
  - Grant Davidson as Si, age 15
- Emily DeForest as Jan
  - Ezra DuVall as Jan, age 6
  - Sofia Sorano Xavier as Jan, age 12
- Clint James as James Robertson
- Whitney Goin as Wanita Carroway
- Tom McCafferty as Willie Carroway
- Jackson Dean Vincent as Alan Robertson, age 8-10
- Sawyer Jesse Mixon as Jase Robertson, age 4-6
- Nick Milone as young Terry Bradshaw

== Production ==
The film was shot in Shreveport, Louisiana in early 2022. Korie Robertson acted as a producer, while Willie Robertson was an executive producer. The Robertson family appeared in a behind the scenes podcast called The Blind Movie Podcast.

== Release ==
The film was released in theaters on September 28, 2023 by Fathom Events.

=== Box office ===
The film took first place on its opening day with $844,783 from 1,715 theaters. It went on to debut to $4.1 million finishing in sixth place. In its second weekend, despite losing 401 theaters, the film grossed $4 million (an increase of 12.9%), finishing in fifth.

As of its release The Blind became Fathom Events' highest-grossing domestic theatrical release.

=== Home media ===
It was released on digital download on Apple TV, Amazon Prime Video, and other platforms on November 3, 2023, and was officially released on Blu-ray and DVD on November 14 in the US.

Sony Entertainment and Great American Media announced they had streaming rights for the film on Great American Pure Flix, starting on March 22, 2024.

== Reception ==
Mike McGranaghan from The Aisle Seat gave the film a rating of 3/4, noting that Phil Robertson's fans and even those less familiar with him may find it enjoyable and insightful. Avi Offer of NYC Movie Guru described it as a "genuinely heartfelt, honest, and inspirational emotional journey well worth taking." However, Roger Moore of Movie Nation had a less favorable opinion, giving the film a rating of 1.5/4, expressing that it lacked overall fact-checking quality.
