= Si-cology 1 =

- Author: Si Robertson, Mark Schlabach
- Cover artist: Mark Schlabach
- Language: English
- Subject: Autobiography
- Genre: Non-fiction; Fiction
- Publisher: Howard Books
- Publication date: September 3, 2013
- Publication place: United States
- Media type: Print (Hardcover)
- Pages: 231
- Preceded by: Happy, Happy, Happy by Phil Robertson

Si-cology 1: Tales and Wisdom from Duck Dynasty's Favorite Uncle is an autobiography by American television personality Silas Robertson, co-written by Mark Schlabach.

== Summary ==
In this book Si tells his life story detailing what life was like for him as a young boy living in Louisiana. He retells stories about how he went overseas to Vietnam as a soldier during the war and what his life is like being Uncle Si on A&E show Duck Dynasty.

== Release ==
It was first published on September 3, 2013, by Simon & Schuster. They also published an audiobook adaption narrated by Si Robertson. On September 27, 2016, it had a Christian follow-up titled Si-renity: How I Stay Calm and Keep the Faith.

== Reception ==
The book became a New York Times Best Seller, and Publishers Weekly wrote "The Duck Dynasty empire rolls on. Si Robertson, a member of the extravagantly bearded Robertson clan, who struck it rich in the duck call business and then got famous thanks to a reality TV show, is the latest member of the family to hit the bestseller lists." The book was positively received and became recommended reading by Entertainment Weekly and PopSugar.
