= List of Duck Dynasty episodes =

The following is a list of episodes of the A&E reality television series Duck Dynasty. The series is set in West Monroe, Louisiana and stars Willie Robertson, CEO of Duck Commander, a duck call company, and his family and co-workers.

== Series overview ==
Season	Episodes	Originally released	
Season	Episodes	First released	Last released
1	15	March 21, 2012	May 23, 2012
2	13	October 10, 2012	December 5, 2012
3	13	February 27, 2013	April 24, 2013
4	11	August 14, 2013	December 11, 2013
5	10	January 15, 2014	March 26, 2014
6	9	June 11, 2014	August 13, 2014
7	10	November 19, 2014	February 11, 2015
8	9	June 24, 2015	August 19, 2015
9	11	January 13, 2016	March 2, 2016
10	14	July 6, 2016	August 24, 2016
11	15	November 16, 2016	March 29, 2017

== Episodes ==
=== Season 1 (2012) ===
No. overall	No. in season	Title	Original release date	US viewers (millions)
1	1	"Family Funny Business"	March 21, 2012	1.81
One of the company's clients needs a large order of duck calls, but Willie has trouble finding anyone to help fill it. Jase and Phil draft him for a late-night frog hunting trip, Korie pulls Phil and Miss Kay in to film a cooking DVD, and Jase decides to flood the loading dock and use it as a test pond for trying out new calls on actual ducks.
2	2	"CEO for a Day"	March 21, 2012	1.67
With the big Robertson family football game coming up, Phil gets his grandchildren to help set up the field. Willie goes overboard with his training regimen and hits Korie in the face with a pass. When Jase thinks he can be just as good a CEO as Willie, Willie gives him the job for the day, leaving him and Si to try to deliver a truckload of duck calls to a client on short notice.
3	3	"High Tech Redneck"	March 28, 2012	1.43
A large order is placed at Duck Commander, and in order to keep up, Jase and the other employees decide to build a conveyor belt. The work goes less well than planned until Miss Kay uses a favorite old trick of hers. Meanwhile, Phil and Si declare war against the beavers who are disrupting their duck hunting and call John Luke in to help deliver the final blow.
4	4	"Frog in One"	March 28, 2012	1.56
Jase and Willie ditch their kids' career day at elementary school to play golf and send Phil and Si as their replacements, which makes for an interesting day. Later, Phil, Si, Jase, and Godwin return to the golf course to hunt frogs Jase saw in the pond, only to be caught by a patrolling security officer.
5	5	"Redneck Logic"	April 4, 2012	1.82
After Willie comments on Miss Kay's hoarding tendencies, she and the women hold a yard sale and sell a few of the guys' treasured possessions out from under them, including Phil's favorite chair. Willie talks Phil into giving up one of his old duck blinds, and the guys blow it up and build a new one using an old RV outside Phil and Miss Kay's house.
6	6	"Too Close for Comfort"	April 4, 2012	1.93
Jase drives Willie to distraction by building himself a private office as an extension on the warehouse. Miss Kay decides to get some pet goats after a visit to the petting zoo, then leaves Willie to deal with them after they prove too hard to handle. Phil takes Cole out on the river to catch crawfish for the night's dinner.
7	7	"Leave it to Beavers"	April 11, 2012	1.37
When the duck ponds on the Robertson land go dry, Phil launches an all-out assault on the beavers that have disrupted the water flow, bringing in firearms, Si's homemade explosives, and an impromptu flamethrower. Miss Kay decides that she wants to open her own restaurant, but soon learns that she needs more than her love of cooking to get the job done.
8	8	"A Big Duck-ing Call"	April 11, 2012	1.31
To celebrate Duck Commander's 40th anniversary party, Willie decides to build the world's largest duck call. Miss Kay takes Phil along to go house-hunting, but he is not too pleased.
9	9	"Sauvignon Beard"	April 18, 2012	1.57
Willie buys a vineyard sight unseen, planning to market a line of Duck Commander wine, but finds that winemaking takes a lot more time and effort than he originally thought. Meanwhile, Phil and Si have their hands full looking after their younger granddaughters for the day.
10	10	"Plan Bee"	April 25, 2012	1.90
Willie, Jase, and Si come across a beehive while hunting and try to collect its honey, but come up empty-handed until Phil and Cole show them how to do the job right. Korie and Missy end up stuck at the top of a scissor lift when they go up to the warehouse roof to collect duck decoys for a church carnival.
11	11	"Daddy's Got a Gun"	May 2, 2012	2.15
After discovering that his daughter Sadie has a boyfriend, Willie decides to get to know him by taking him hunting, and brings Jase along. Meanwhile, Phil and Si take Sadie on an outing.
12	12	"Fishin' for Business"	May 9, 2012	1.83
Willie and Jase compete to see who can catch and sell the most fish, bringing their sons as well as Si and Phil along to help. Meanwhile, the Robertson ladies decide to sew an apron for Miss Kay, but their lack of sewing knowledge leaves them stuck until Si pitches in.
13	13	"Redneck Roadtrip"	May 16, 2012	2.05
Jase tricks Willie into letting him use the Duck Commander RV, and he brings Jep, Martin, and Si along for a road trip. Meanwhile, chaos is caused when Willie finds an alligator in Phil and Miss Kay's yard.
14	14	"Winner, Winner, Turkey Dinner"	May 23, 2012	2.31
The Robertson men and women compete in their annual turkey cook-off, with Phil judging each side's recipes. Jase and Si go hunting to bring in the birds for the competition, using decoys that prove a little too effective, and Phil makes a few unwanted "renovations" around the Duck Commander office that include taking down all the doors.
15	15	"Willie Stay or Willie Go"	May 23, 2012	2.56
When Willie is offered another job, he takes the Duck Commander crew on an employee retreat in order to help him figure out what to do. However, things quickly turn sour when the men find that Willie has taken them to a team-building camp and ridicule him ceaselessly for it.

=== Season 2 (2012) ===
No. overall	No. in season	Title	Original release date	US viewers (millions)
16	1	"The Grass And The Furious"	October 10, 2012	3.70
Challenged to a riding lawnmower race by his arch-nemesis, Willie calls in the guys to help him practice and outfit his mower, but finds the competition to be at a far higher level than he thought. Phil tries to build a playhouse for his granddaughters, ending up with an odd-looking structure that they cheerfully turn into a pretend duck blind.
17	2	"Driving Miss Sadie"	October 10, 2012	3.94
Sadie receives some driving lessons from Willie, Si, Jase, and Jep – all with disastrous results. Meanwhile, Phil plays chaperone on John Luke's date.
18	3	"Truck Commander"	October 17, 2012	3.86
After John Luke brings Willie's truck home completely out of gas, Willie and Korie decide that he needs to learn some responsibility. Willie's search to find a truck for John Luke takes some unexpected turns, and Si gets one for himself and sends off his old truck by blowing it up. Jase, Martin, and Godwin face Phil's anger after they take his rowboat without asking and accidentally sink it.
19	4	"Si-Yonara"	October 17, 2012	3.84
Feeling that the crew is not working enough, Si quits his job. Willie hires a guy to take Si's place, but Jase and the guys immediately hate him due to his obnoxious tendencies and eccentric behavior.
20	5	"Fowl Play"	October 24, 2012	3.39
After Jase breaks into Willie's office, Willie installs a surveillance system in the warehouse that irritates the guys and ends up getting on his nerves as well. Sadie's huge cell phone bill prompts Willie and Korie to confiscate her phone and send her to do chores for Phil and Miss Kay.
21	6	"Sweatin' Bullets"	October 24, 2012	3.51
On an unbearably hot day, the air conditioning goes out, so Willie calls in Mountain Man - the only (and slowest) AC repairman in the area - to fix it. While waiting for him to figure out the problem, Jase and the guys turn the lake into a redneck water park and invite the entire family to cool off with them.
22	7	"Spring Pong Cleaning"	November 7, 2012	3.60
An embarrassing mistake during a trip to gather muscadine berries leads Si to visit the eye doctor for the first time in years. The guys' assignment to clean out the warehouse turns into an all-day ping-pong tournament when they uncover an old table among the junk. Phil takes John Luke and Cole fishing and tries to get some insight into the teenage mind.
23	8	"Good Morning, West Monroe"	November 7, 2012	3.63
Willie is invited to be a guest on Mountain Man's radio show, not realizing that the broadcast is done more for comedy than to give out hunting advice, and Si drives him crazy by inviting himself along and telling embarrassing stories about Willie. Jase gets a citation from the local homeowners' association for burning leaves and keeping chickens on his lawn and defends himself like a true Robertson at the group's next meeting.
24	9	"Samurai Si"	November 14, 2012	4.25
When one of Willie's clients sends him a samurai sword, the rest of the guys are instantly drawn to it. They sneak it out of Willie's office and have fun chopping things apart until the blade snaps, forcing them to try to find a shop that can repair it. Willie arranges for Phil to take Sadie to take shooting lessons much to his wife's dislike.
25	10	"Of Mattresses and Men"	November 14, 2012	4.42
Taking a break from work, Jase, Si, Jep, and the guys visit a donut shop and bet among themselves as to who can eat the most donuts. Si wins and uses the money to buy tickets to the shop's raffle, in which a new camper is the top prize. He wins the drawing and quickly converts the camper into his personal office, where he spends so much time napping that the guys prank Si by towing the camper into the woods with him inside. Meanwhile, Phil and Miss Kay drag Willie into their search for a new couch, which quickly turns awkward.
26	11	"Duck No We Won't Go"	November 28, 2012	4.71
Willie's insistence on new workplace rules, including uniforms, irritates Jase so much that he leads the guys out on what turns into a very disorganized strike. After Miss Kay finds herself with a huge batch of leftover boudin from a church lunch, Jessica borrows a friend's food truck and recruits Phil to drive it so they can try and sell the food before it spoils.
27	12	"Drag Me to Glory"	November 28, 2012	4.93
NASCAR driver Clint Bowyer pays a visit to the Duck Commander warehouse, and Willie and the guys are fired up to spend the day hanging out with him. But too much enthusiasm about the celebrity's mode of transportation turns into a drag race showdown between Willie and Clint. Phil and Si have their hands full trying to fix Miss Kay's barbecue when a trip to the outdoor grill store turns disastrous.
28	13	"I'm Dreaming of a Redneck Christmas"	December 5, 2012	6.45
Christmas special. Willie plays Santa Claus at the local church, but the event proves disastrous when Si, as his elf helper, brings the wrong presents and scares the kids. Jase and the rest of the guys try hopelessly to put up lights and yard decorations for Miss Kay while she and Phil go hunting for a Christmas tree. Note: This is the one-hour, second season finale, and was the highest rated telecast in A&E history until the fourth season premiere.

=== Season 3 (2013) ===
No. overall	No. in season	Title	Original release date	US viewers (millions)
29	1	"Duck Season Eve"	February 27, 2013	8.62
On the night before duck season starts, the guys follow a Robertson tradition by camping on the family land. Willie brings the Duck Commander RV along, splitting them into two groups – one willing to rough it and one ready to sleep comfortably in the RV. Phil runs into resistance from Miss Kay when he tries to uphold his own tradition of not bathing until the season starts. Note: This episode beat out the Season 2 finale as the highest-rated telecast in A&E history with a 4.3 adults 18–49 rating, but would itself be surpassed by the season three one-hour finale.
30	2	"Can't Hardly Weight"	February 27, 2013	8.53
Willie decides he needs to lose a few pounds in advance of his high school reunion. The weight-loss campaign leads him to try the Shake Weight, take a yoga class and chop firewood for Jase, but Korie turns out to have the best trick of them all. Convinced that the family's hunting dogs now hate him, Si goes in search of a new hunting dog.
31	3	"Shot Thru the Heart"	March 6, 2013	8.16
John Luke breaks up with his girlfriend, so the Duckmen take him hunting to get over it, even though he is unfazed by the breakup. Phil and Miss Kay spend the day having their picture taken with their dogs by pet photographer Seth Casteel.
32	4	"Here Lizard, Lizard"	March 6, 2013	8.21
A monitor lizard that Martin is studying for a school project escapes from its cage and hides in the warehouse. The guys try everything they can think of to catch it, without success, so they call in Phil for help. On the other side of town, Willie goes for a ride-along with the West Monroe Police Department but Si invites himself, and the two pull Missy over for speeding as a prank.
33	5	"Hallu-Si-Nations"	March 13, 2013	7.94
With Willie ditching work, the guys decide to do the same and fix up the duck blinds on the Robertson land. While out, Si believes he spots what he thinks is the infamous "Black Panther," which leads the nay-saying men on a mission to prove that what Si saw was in his imagination. Back at Phil's house, Phil enlists the help of his football-playing grandson Reed and his fellow teammate to do yard work, claiming that the tasks will "make them better football players."
34	6	"Let's Go Hunting, Deer"	March 13, 2013	8.29
After Jep tells Willie and Jase that Jessica has killed a deer, Willie and Jase decide to take their wives hunting. Things quickly go wrong after Korie mistakenly sprays herself with doe urine and Missy wears bright clothing. Phil and Miss Kay call Si in to help search through their storage sheds for the blueprints to Phil's first duck call.
35	7	"Tickets to the Fun Show"	March 20, 2013	7.67
Si wins $2,000 during the company's Casino Night and uses the money to buy a massage chair, but it proves to be such a distraction that Willie makes him return it. Si instead has Willie take him to a children's pizza place and fun center so he can win a giant stuffed purple gorilla. Phil takes the rest of the guys to a secret fishing location, after blindfolding them first, but run into trouble from both the landowner and a group of beavers that have dammed up the water flow.
36	8	"Duck Be a Lady"	March 20, 2013	7.84
Sadie has been elected to the homecoming court at her high school, but Willie disapproves of her dress selection. He takes her shopping for a different one, with Si tagging along to get out of work for the day. Meanwhile, the warehouse's coffee maker breaks down, leaving Jase without his usual morning cup until Jep suggests that the guys try a new coffee shop.
37	9	"Ring Around the Redneck"	March 27, 2013	8.50
Missy decides that Jase needs to replace his wedding ring, which he lost years ago during a frog hunt. He gets a new one but soon loses it while duck hunting, forcing the guys to figure out a plan to break the news to Missy. Si pulls his old metal detector out of storage to help find the ring, but he gets distracted hunting for treasure that he buried in his yard after he returned from Vietnam years ago.
38	10	"Bass Man Standing"	April 3, 2013	8.38
Duck Commander gets its own section in the local Bass Pro Shops store, and Willie envisions a huge poster of the Duckmen as a backdrop. His plan makes for a long, uncomfortable photo shoot and gets derailed after Jep sends in the wrong picture. Miss Kay embarrasses John Luke and Sadie in front of their friends by going bowling with the group.
39	11	"Si-amese Twins"	April 10, 2013	7.82
Willie is forced to do a human resources seminar on a Saturday. Si handcuffs himself to Willie during the meeting, and Jase takes glee when the key goes missing and they cannot find any tools to cut the chain. Korie and Missy convince Miss Kay to buy a new washer and dryer set, but she and Phil get completely lost looking for the store.
40	12	"Battle of the Brothers"	April 17, 2013	8.60
Willie surprises the guys by dyeing his beard, taking up the guitar, and buying a motorcycle even though he has no idea how to drive it. Suspicions of a midlife crisis lead to a series of challenges between the three brothers, with unexpected results. Miss Kay and Phil get some cats to deal with the mice in their house, but they turn out to be more of a hassle than Miss Kay expected. Jessica came in to Miss Kay and Phil's house.
41	13	"Aloha, Robertsons!"	April 24, 2013	9.63
After all their hard work, Willie decides to take the entire Robertson clan on a family vacation to Kalaoa, Hawaii. But Willie's daily itinerary for the trip gets constantly undermined by the family's desire to participate in their own island activities. Note: This is the one-hour, Season 3 finale, and was the highest rated telecast in A&E history, until the Season 4 premiere, with a 4.3 rating among adults age 18–49.

=== Season 4 (2013) ===
No. overall	No. in season	Title	Original release date	US viewers (millions)
42	1	"Till Duck Do Us Part"	August 14, 2013	11.77
The brothers' wives decide to hold a ceremony on the Robertson land for Phil and Miss Kay to renew their vows on their wedding anniversary. They send Si to keep the couple occupied for the day and draft everyone else, including Mountain Man, to make the arrangements. Si's plan to take Phil and Miss Kay on a trip down Memory Lane ends up going down a few wrong turns. Notes: This is the one-hour, Season 4 premiere, and is currently the highest rated telecast in A&E history with a 5.0 rating among adults 18–49. It is also the first appearance of the Robertsons' oldest son Alan.(This is not the first appearance of Alan. He was in season 2 episode 8.)
43	2	"So You Think You Can Date?"	August 21, 2013	10.07
Martin surprises the guys with news that he has a date, and everyone mobilizes to get him ready with sometimes-questionable advice on style and etiquette. Phil tries to teach his younger granddaughters a little about fishing, but things do not go as well as planned.
44	3	"Hot Tub Grime Machine"	August 28, 2013	9.60
Godwin calls in a favor with the guys so he can get a hot tub, but he has only $200 to spend. They band together to find him one at a local junkyard and get it set up on his front lawn. Phil decides to teach some of his grandchildren about patience and living off the land by having them collect mayhaws to make jelly.
45	4	"A-Jase-ent Living"	September 4, 2013	10.45
Willie and Korie invite Jase and his kids to spend the weekend with them, since Jase's house is being renovated and Missy is out of town. However, Jase's behavior – such as cooking breakfast at 4 a.m. and cleaning crawfish in the bathtub – soon has Willie ready to throw him out. Meanwhile, Si, Jep, Martin, and Godwin make a series of informal wagers that eventually leads them to accept Phil's challenge of getting his old rowboat out of a tree.
46	5	"Termite Be a Problem"	September 11, 2013	9.14
Willie reluctantly agrees to speak at a lunch meeting of Miss Kay's friends at the Golden 60's club, but runs into one aggravation after another – a small crowd, a forgetful member who goes with him to pick up the food and is short on cash to pay for it, and not having a usable speech ready. A termite infestation at the warehouse forces the guys to relocate to Godwin's house, where they find a jackalope statue left to him by his great-uncle and try to sell it to a taxidermist.
47	6	"John Luke After Dentist"	September 18, 2013	9.42
After the warehouse's deep freezer breaks down, Jase and Jep get the job of cleaning out all the spoiled meat inside, but they and Phil have a hard time finding a place to dispose of it. John Luke and Sadie visit the dentist to have their wisdom teeth removed, generating plenty of embarrassing cell phone video fodder as John Luke recovers from the anesthesia.
48	7	"Scoot Along Si"	October 2, 2013	8.04
Following a minor car accident caused by Willie, Si rents a mobility scooter to get around, insisting that he is in too much pain to walk on his own. He soon starts using it on the streets and getting on everyone's nerves. Miss Kay's pet turtle goes missing, so she talks Phil into helping her search the riverbank for the perfect replacement.
49	8	"Jerky Boys"	October 9, 2013	7.40
Willie's refusal to share a batch of imported biltong prompts the rest of the guys to try making their own jerky. They get sidetracked into a dirt bike race while searching for Godwin's dehydrator, then get an unpleasant surprise when they sample the finished product. Phil takes Willie on a drive around the Robertson land to point out who will inherit which section, but his decisions leave Willie at a loss.
50	9	"Going Si-ral"	October 16, 2013	7.26
The guys find a way to get around the firewall Willie has installed to stop them from goofing off on the Internet at work. Si becomes obsessed with YouTube and decides to make an instructional golf video that turns into a hilarious embarrassment. After John Luke damages Willie's truck in an accident, Willie gets a loaner from the dealership and tries to keep Priscilla and River from ruining it as he takes them to visit Miss Kay.
51	10	"Quack O'Lanterns"	October 23, 2013	8.40
The guys turn the warehouse into a haunted house as a Halloween treat for the neighborhood kids, and Willie's goal is to make it as scary as possible. Costume plans among the three brothers and their wives lead to some strange results. Even Phil, who does not think much of the holiday, starts to get in on the festivities by doing a little unorthodox pumpkin-carving with his grandchildren.
52	11	"O Little Town of West Monroe"	December 11, 2013	8.89
The Duck Commander staff is called on to perform a nativity play at their church, with Missy directing and Korie and Willie playing Mary and Joseph, but rehearsals go far from smoothly. Phil introduces Miss Kay and Jessica to the fine points of hog hunting, and Willie and Jase argue over who stole whose idea to give a family portrait to their wives.

=== Season 5 (2014) ===
No. overall	No. in season	Title	Original release date	US viewers (millions)
53	1	"Boomerang Becca"	January 15, 2014	8.49
Rebecca comes home for a visit after finishing a fashion internship in Los Angeles, California, but Willie starts wondering how long she plans to stay. She later surprises him with news of her plan to start her own business. After Si contracts what he believes to be bird flu, Phil and Miss Kay let him stay in living room with them while he recovers and end up trying not to let him drive them crazy. Note: This is the first appearance of Willie and Korie's adopted daughter Rebecca.
54	2	"Willie's Number Two"	January 15, 2014	8.51
Willie hires Korie's cousin John David as a personal assistant, but Jase, Martin, and Godwin rebel against the idea of having an outsider giving them orders. Si organizes a boring, confusing treasure hunt for Jep's children to keep them occupied while Jessica gets over a cold.
55	3	"Life of Si"	January 22, 2014	6.65
Taking a hint from Jep, Si outfits himself with a pair of wearable cameras so he can record every moment of his daily life. He drives the guys crazy with his nonstop commentary during a deer hunt, treating it as if it were an epic war/survival movie. Willie's plans to take John Luke and Sadie to an LSU football game run afoul of heavy traffic and a balky GPS.
56	4	"From Duck 'Til Dawn"	January 29, 2014	7.48
Willie volunteers to join the guys for their latest all-night packing session, but ends up helping Jase track down faulty smoke detectors and falling victim to a prank. Phil gets more than he bargained for when his granddaughters talk him into letting them sleep over with him and Miss Kay.
57	5	"Burger Commander"	February 5, 2014	6.51
Jase challenges Willie to a hamburger cook-off, but their very different strategies lead to end results so bad that neither of the judges (Martin and Godwin) wants to eat them. When Jessica decides to take up decoupage, Jep goes hunting for materials and ends up getting tricked by Phil into cleaning the junk out of one of his storage sheds.
58	6	"G.I. SI"	February 19, 2014	5.48
An argument over a treasured G.I. Joe action figure collectible leads to a paintball war between Willie and Jase that degenerates into complete chaos when everyone's strategies backfire and Si goes rogue, shooting at both teams. Jep and Martin call Phil in to help straighten out the new front walk they are putting in at Jep and Jessica's house, and the three turn the job into a race against the crew replacing the roof.
59	7	"Jase and the Argonauts"	February 26, 2014	5.17
Not satisfied with Willie's offer of soft-serve ice cream as an incentive, Jase buys an amphibious ATV and offers the use of it to motivate the guys and speed up production. Phil and Miss Kay call Willie in to hook up their DVD player, but he comes to regret helping them after Miss Kay asks him to show her how to send text messages.
60	8	"Fowl Playhouse"	March 5, 2014	6.10
Jase, Martin, and Godwin offer to build a playhouse for Jep's kids, but their design is nowhere close to what Jep and Jessica had in mind. Phil and Si enjoy giving Willie a hard time when he has to help them re-camouflage the duck blinds, as punishment for oversleeping on the first day of duck season the previous year.
61	9	"The Big LeCOWski"	March 19, 2014	4.71
When Willie brings Sadie to the warehouse as part of a job-shadowing class project, Jase gets her interested in a cow-shaped duck blind, and makes a bet with Willie that it can be effective. Jep takes his family to the petting zoo, where Priscilla and Merritt try their hand at "mutton busting," or sheep riding.
62	10	"Stand by Mia"	March 26, 2014	6.00
Mia is about to enter the hospital for surgery on her cleft lip and palate, and Jase sets up a family reunion party at her request. Willie and the guys make a mess of setting up decorations and have fun goofing around with a portable wrestling ring. Egged on by Jep, Phil and his brother-in-law Gordon get on each other's nerves as the three go duck hunting. Dozens of Robertson relatives turn out for the party, with a wrestling match featuring Hacksaw Jim Duggan as the main event. Notes: This is a one-hour season finale. The closing credits were followed by a video clip in which the family accompanied Mia to the hospital for her fifth surgery.

=== Season 6 (2014) ===
No. overall	No. in season	Title	Original release date	US viewers (millions)
63	1	"Governor's Travels"	June 11, 2014	4.59
An impending visit by Bobby Jindal, Governor of Louisiana, to present an award to Duck Commander throws everyone into chaos. Korie and Sadie try to find the perfect outfit for Miss Kay with little help from Phil, Willie and Si offer less-than-reliable coaching tips for an introductory speech John Luke has to make, and the guys goof off during a warehouse cleanup and give him some advice of their own. Governor Jindal surprises Willie by playing a little warehouse basketball with the guys before the award ceremony.
64	2	"Quack and Gown"	June 18, 2014	3.92
The night before Reed's high school graduation, Willie, Jase, and Si take him frog hunting and dispense a few bits of unusual advice for his future. Jep leads Miss Kay, Korie, and Jessica on a run to toilet-paper Jase and Missy's house, but Missy catches them in the act.
65	3	"Hands on a Woodchipper"	June 25, 2014	3.41
Willie sponsors a contest for Mountain Man's radio show, in which the last person with their hands on a wood chipper wins it. He and Si end up as the only contestants, with Willie on the receiving end of taunts from both Si and Jase. An overly protective Jep insists on chaperoning Lily during her miniature golf play date with a boy and challenges him to a game.
66	4	"Quackdraft"	July 2, 2014	3.66
Willie's old friend, now a fire chief, offers to let the brothers undergo some training drills - which turn out to be far more physically demanding than any of them expected. Miss Kay's plan to lay flowers on her grandmother's grave turns into a hunt for the ideal sites for herself, Phil, and Si.
67	5	"Brand of Brothers"	July 9, 2014	3.93
When Willie starts thinking about changing the Duck Commander logo, Jase and the guys try to show him that they can do the job as well as any professional design firm. Bella turns to Phil for help on a school project, only to have him lead her and Willie on a rambling trip through both the woods and his memory.
68	6	"De-Bug Life"	July 16, 2014	3.74
Phil and the guys set out to clean out all the duck blinds, turning up an assortment of odd wildlife and old garbage along the way. When they find an infestation of fire ants in one blind, Jase takes extreme measures to wipe them out. Si surprises Willie and the rest of the family with unorthodox advertising tricks that bring in business for a church fundraiser car wash.
69	7	"Men vs. Wild"	July 30, 2014	3.45
Egged on by Si to prove their wilderness skills, the brothers hold a race through the woods, with Jep and Alan against Willie and Jase. Both teams have a rough time finding their way, and it takes a sneaky trick to decide the victory. Going overboard with his newfound passion for coupon-clipping, Si sets out with Miss Kay to buy everything in sight at the grocery store.
70	8	"Return of the Beavers"	August 6, 2014	3.38
Phil recruits Jase, Jep, Si, and John Luke for his campaign to wipe out the latest beaver infestation on the family land. They have some dynamite, but no safety fuses, and must resort to Si's homemade napalm in order to destroy the main beaver dam. Willie decides to join Bella in her introductory karate class, but his less-than-serious attitude quickly gets on the instructor's nerves and leads to painful embarrassment.
71	9	"Lake Boss"	August 13, 2014	3.81
For Willie's birthday, Jase organizes a family trip to Lake D'Arbonne, a favorite hangout of the brothers in their youth. The outing gets off to a rough start, with Jase haggling to rent a boat, no one being able to find the key to the lake house, and Phil recruiting Miss Kay and his granddaughters to catch a raccoon running loose in the house. Jase's attempts to draw Willie into fun activities fall flat until he and Jep spot a man using a water-powered jet pack and set up a chance for Willie to use it as his last and best birthday present. Note: This is a one-hour season finale.

=== Season 7 (2014–2015) ===
No. overall	No. in season	Title	Original release date	US viewers (millions)
72	1	"Glory Is the Reward of Mallard"	November 19, 2014	2.62
Willie takes the family to Scotland on a business trip. Korie and the guys interrupt and embarrass him during a round of golf with a prospective customer, to whom Willie is determined to prove that he is descended from Scottish royalty. He takes Phil, Miss Kay, and Korie to a museum that focuses on the family's ancestors – and which turns out to be much smaller than expected. Attending the Inverkeithing Highland games with Missy, Martin, Godwin, and Alan, Jase finds himself hopelessly outclassed when he decides to compete. Jep and Jessica's plans to take a romantic driving tour of the countryside go awry when they get stuck with both a very small car and Si, who is intent on catching the Loch Ness Monster. Note: The one-hour season premiere.
73	2	"Good Night and Good Duck"	November 26, 2014	2.57
The Robertsons host a special Thanksgiving episode of the morning show on local TV station KNOE. Segments include a turkey deep-frying demonstration by Miss Kay and Korie, a bizarre weather forecast delivered by Si, a report from the woods with Phil, fashion advice from Willie, Missy, and Rebecca, and exercise tips from Jep and Jessica.
74	3	"Quack in the Saddle"	December 3, 2014	2.31
Willie decides to invest in a racehorse, egged on by Jase, Jep, and Si, but learns the hard way that there are no guarantees of success. Phil, Martin, and Godwin get dragged into Miss Kay's quest to find the perfect birdbath for the front lawn, since she wants to keep the birds from being eaten by her dog Bobo.
75	4	"A Home for the Holidays"	December 10, 2014	2.87
The family pulls together to assemble a modular house for the mother of one of their longtime friends, but they have only one day to finish the project. As Jase, Jep, Martin, and Godwin build the deck, Phil runs afoul of the brothers' wives with his less-than-delicate cooking methods in the kitchen. Willie and the younger children lay down tracks for a new Christmas song at a recording studio, with Miss Kay keeping an eye on them and Si driving everyone crazy by goofing around at the controls and microphone.
76	5	"The Cannonball Runs"	January 7, 2015	2.68
Having opened his own restaurant, Willie tries to develop a signature bologna sandwich for the menu despite mixed reactions from the guys and his family. When Jase lines up a sponsorship for the restaurant on the local outhouse racing circuit, the guys build a vehicle and enter it against Willie's old lawnmower-racing rival.
77	6	"Mo Math, Mo Problems"	January 14, 2015	2.45
Unable to help Sadie with her algebra homework, Willie calls in Jase and Jep to demonstrate one problem. However, bickering between Willie and Jase turns the exercise into a race – truck versus truck, then truck versus man. Phil agrees to never again mention Miss Kay's hoarding habits if he can skip a friend's birthday party, but the deal takes a bizarre turn once Si and Mountain Man get involved to put it in writing.
78	7	"Coop! There It Is"	January 21, 2015	2.64
Willie, Martin, and Godwin learn about the extensive renovations in progress at the house Jep and Jessica have bought in Willie's neighborhood. Jep clashes with Jessica over his plans to turn one room into a "man cave" and overhaul his ramshackle chicken coop. Meanwhile, Jase and Si teach Mia, Priscilla, and River to fish using plastic soda bottles – with Si drinking most of the contents first.
79	8	"Friday Afternoon Lights"	January 28, 2015	2.27
Willie volunteers to be the assistant coach of Li'l Will's school football team at one day's practice. However, he soon learns that watching the sport is very different from coaching it, and Li'l Will challenges him to a race and the guys to a football game. Jep invites Miss Kay, Si, and Alan to work out with him at a local gym, but they spend more time goofing off than breaking a sweat.
80	9	"Master and Duck Commander"	February 4, 2015	2.04
Jase recruits the guys to help him turn a friend's old pontoon boat into a floating duck blind, despite their skepticism and the locals' puzzled reactions. Willie schedules obedience training for Bobo, but the session is a disappointment due to both Bobo and Miss Kay getting easily distracted.
81	10	"Sweet Home Louisiana"	February 11, 2015	2.51
When Jep is diagnosed with encephalitis and meningitis, the rest of the family pitches in to decorate his and Jessica's new house while he recovers. On the hunt for Jep's meat smoker at a self-storage facility warehouse, Willie, Alan, and Phil find that he shares Miss Kay's hoarding tendencies. As the brothers' wives commandeer the decorating effort, Jase, Si, Martin, and Godwin visit an auction house in search of the perfect housewarming present - which turns out to be a T-shirt cannon.

=== Season 8 (2015) ===
No. overall	No. in season	Title	Original release date	US viewers (millions)
82	1	"Grooming the Groom"	June 24, 2015	2.51
When John Luke gets engaged, the family decides to throw an antique-themed wedding shower for him and his fiance, Mary Kate. The brothers offer John Luke some very strange relationship advice during a game of golf, while Phil, Missy, and Jessica introduce Mary Kate to the Robertson crawfish etoufée recipe and trade stories of how their marriages began. Meanwhile, Si's ideas of what gifts to buy for the shower have Miss Kay and Korie scratching their heads.
83	2	"Induckpendence Day"	July 1, 2015	2.16
Jase enlists Jep and Godwin to help him test a load of fireworks for Willie's Fourth of July party, using the front yard despite Missy's fears of punishment by the homeowners' association. When the local Veterans Affairs branch opens a military museum exhibit dedicated to Si, he enjoys haranguing Willie and Alan with outrageous stories and takes a deuce-and-a-half truck for a joyride.
84	3	"Search n' Decoy"	July 8, 2015	2.17
Willie accepts Jessica's challenge of a bowling match, egged on by Miss Kay's "Big Sister" club and a $200 bet. However, his rusty bowling skills and their casual behavior at the lanes turn the match into a question of which team can do a better job of losing. After finding out that Phil wants to pay $1,000 each for hand-carved duck decoys, Jase leads the guys in a bid to trick him by repainting some old plastic ones.
85	4	"Wild Wild Pest"	July 15, 2015	2.31
A job clearing nutria rats off a golf course prompts Jase and the guys to expand their efforts. After working on the land owned by one of Jep's friends, they have sausage made from both the rats they catch and a rattlesnake they find. Willie hires John Luke and Sadie to work at his diner for the summer, but they have a lot to learn about waiting tables and customer service.
86	5	"Pranks for Everything"	July 22, 2015	2.17
Phil tries to head off an escalating prank war between Willie and Jase by signing them and Jep up for volunteer work at Alan's church. However, the three brothers' constant goofing off quickly gets on Alan's nerves as he tries to get them to do their jobs. Korie arranges for artist Pierre Henri Matisse, grandson of Henri Matisse, to give the rest of the family an art lesson, using Si as a role-model for their drawings.
87	6	"Bachelor Party Blowout"	July 29, 2015	2.20
Alan and the guys band together to throw Martin a bachelor party at a hunting cabin in honor of his upcoming wedding. The party gets off to a slow start until Jase talks the others into trying out the cabin's black-powder firearms and the cannon in the front yard. Miss Kay's idea to set up a petting zoo for the grandchildren scrambles Willie's plan to attend the party and leaves him trying to wrangle far more animals than he expected.
88	7	"The Ducket List"	August 5, 2015	2.07
When the guys find one of their duck blinds crushed by a falling tree, Si takes it as a near-death experience and makes a "bucket list." They help him fulfill some of the less ridiculous items, but he balks at riding in a hot-air balloon until they dare him to do it. As John Luke prepares to graduate from high school, Miss Kay drags him, Willie, and Alan to her old campus to prove that she earned her diploma.
89	8	"Pit Perfect"	August 12, 2015	2.22
Willie challenges John Luke and Mary Kate to a tennis match, choosing Korie as his partner. He tries to impart some marriage advice to the couple with his on-court heckling, but his competitive streak soon gets the better of him and his shoulder. Meanwhile, Godwin's friend arranges for the guys to visit a local racetrack so they can practice being a pit crew and drive laps, with the position of Grand Marshal at the Duck Commander 500 NASCAR race up for grabs.
90	9	"John Luke Gets Hitched"	August 19, 2015	3.26
The upcoming wedding of John Luke and Mary Kate has the entire Robertson clan working to put together the perfect ceremony. As Korie leads Mary Kate and the bridesmaids in search of the perfect dresses for everyone, Willie's ideas about suits and hair grooming put him at odds with the stylist John Luke brings in to outfit him and the groomsmen. The women bring John Luke in to help plan an outdoor ceremony, but his ideas drift toward the reception food; later, he and the groomsmen go skydiving while the women have a celebratory lunch. Willie offers some unorthodox advice to the couple on writing their own vows before the rehearsal and dinner. Friends and relatives pack the Robertson farmhouse lawn for the ceremony, with Willie officiating. The episode is punctuated by commentary from the men and their wives on aspects of their own weddings. Note: This is a one-hour season finale.

=== Season 9 (2016) ===
No. overall	No. in season	Title	Original release date	US viewers (millions)
91	1	"Inlawful Entry"	January 13, 2016	2.07
When Missy's parents, Larry and Peggy, arrive for an unannounced visit, Larry's boisterous behavior quickly gets on Jase's nerves both at home and around the warehouse. A quail hunt with the guys unravels due to his loud talking and inexperience with modern shotguns. Meanwhile, John Luke opens a snow cone stand, but Willie is less than impressed with his business strategy until customers start showing up in force.
92	2	"Flock and Key"	January 13, 2016	2.00
After Si's storage shed is burglarized, he rents a metal storage container to replace it and serve as a zombie apocalypse survival bunker. The guys lock Jep inside as a prank, only to realize that none of them knows the combination to its lock. With Missy out of town, Jase tries to do Mia's hair and makeup for a cheerleading competition and botches the job, running afoul of her coach.
93	3	"Ball in the Family"	January 20, 2016	2.10
A dodgeball challenge from Willie's old lawnmower/outhouse-racing rival prompts all three brothers and their wives to team up for a game. Willie's over-enthusiastic coaching style makes both teams wonder if he may be taking the challenge a little too seriously. Believing that his cat has been sneaking around the neighborhood and spending time with other families, Si calls in Mountain Man to track it down.
94	4	"Drone Survivor"	January 20, 2016	2.13
Jase is determined to prove to Phil that they should put roofs on the duck blinds to avoid being seen by the ducks. Jep outfits his new drone with a camera and flies it up for an overhead view, but a steering mishap leaves the guys puzzled as to how to get it out of a tree so they can review the footage. A visit to the chiropractor to have Si's sore back checked out gives him and Willie a chance for a few laughs at each other's expense.
95	5	"Alan in Charge"	January 27, 2016	1.80
Dismayed at the haphazard state of the warehouse's filing system, Willie hires Alan as office manager at Jase's suggestion. However, the changes that Alan implements around the workroom quickly drive the guys crazy and make Jase want to eat his words. An alarm malfunction at Willie and Korie's house prompts the Robertson women and girls to take a self-defense class, with John Luke as the instructor's assistant/victim.
96	6	"Renaissance Men"	January 27, 2016	1.85
The family celebrates Godwin's birthday with a Renaissance fair, but it takes a strange turn with the guys' choice of costumes. A medieval tournament between Alan, Jase, Willie, and Sadie goes awry in every event and produces a surprise winner. When Jep and Jessica visit a falconry expert to borrow one of his birds for the party, Jep gets carried away posing with them.
97	7	"Heroes Welcome"	February 3, 2016	1.62
The family flies two wounded Marines, Mark and Christian, in from Walter Reed Medical Center to honor their service, planning a fishing trip and a Color Run. After the guys show them around the warehouse, Mark has to go to the hospital, but Christian goes fishing with them and participates in the Color Run. Author and former Navy SEAL Marcus Luttrell addresses the crowd at the start of the run, then visits Mark in the hospital afterward.
98	8	"Pie Hard"	February 10, 2016	1.58
When Miss Kay starts thinking about opening a bakery to sell her pies, she butts heads with Alan over who should run it. His daughter Alex has to prove that she can handle Miss Kay's recipes, assuming she can decipher them first, and Phil ends up having to deliver the verdict in the final taste test. After the guys take a long lunch break at Godwin's favorite diner in Vicksburg, Mississippi, he tackles the owner's hot dog eating challenge in order to win a free T-shirt.
99	9	"Van He'llsing"	February 17, 2016	1.35
Reed, pursuing a career as a singer-songwriter, comes home from Nashville for an album release party. Though his long hair, tattoos, and broken-down 1960s-era van catch Jase and Missy by surprise, they and the rest of the family turn out to show their support. Willie brings in professional wrestler Kurt Angle to help toughen River up, but Jep's hero worship and Willie's competitive streak get the better of them both on the wrestling mat.
100	10	"Toad to Perdition"	February 24, 2016	1.37
The brothers' wives challenge them to a frog hunt, with a night of dancing on the line if the wives catch more. Even though they secretly bring in Phil for help, the hunt proves tougher than expected for both teams as night falls. As John Luke and Mary Kate start packing (and overpacking) for college, they get a flood of conflicting advice from Si and Miss Kay over what to take and leave at home.
101	11	"RV There Yet?"	March 2, 2016	1.74
Willie organizes a road trip to take John Luke and Mary Kate to Liberty University for their first semester. Korie, Sadie, Jase, Missy, and Si come along for the ride. During a visit with Willie's friend Colt Ford in Nashville, Tennessee, Si drives the family crazy with his dreams of being a rock star. A housing assignment mix-up leaves John Luke and Mary Kate without a place to stay until their house is ready, so Willie leaves the Duck Commander RV with them. As the family flies home, they stop in Nashville again so Si can indulge his performing fantasy onstage with Colt. To celebrate River's seventh birthday, Jep and Jessica help him film and star in a superhero movie. Phil, Miss Kay, Martin, and Godwin end up being dragged into Jep's grandiose artistic vision, which slowly deteriorates into egotism and utter chaos. Note: This is a one-hour season finale.

=== Season 10 (2016) ===
No. overall	No. in season	Title	Original release date	US viewers (millions)
102	1	"Willie & Korie's Anniversorry"	July 6, 2016	1.30
Plans to celebrate Willie and Korie's 25th wedding anniversary keep going off the rails at every turn. Willie gets terrible gift ideas from his brothers, Korie eavesdrops on the rest of the family's party planning, and both of them realize that they have only been married for 24 years. After Jase gets a ticket for illegally parking his truck on the side of the road, Si comes up with a bizarre strategy to help him fight it in court that works even worse than expected. Note: This episode introduces Willie and Korie's newly adopted son Rowdy.
103	2	"Statue of Imitations"	July 6, 2016	1.35
Willie is less than thrilled after a chainsaw artist delivers a mystery statue that turns out to be of Willie himself, with a huge pot belly. The rest of the guys, though, get as many laughs out of it as they can and eventually catch Korie giving it a late-night trim. Jep's hunt for his old aquarium leads him to Miss Kay's overstuffed storage shed and results in a family intervention concerning her hoarding tendencies.
104	3	"A Decent Proposal"	July 13, 2016	1.49
Missy, Reed, and Mia are in New York City, New York so Reed can propose to his girlfriend Brighton in Central Park, ignoring Jase's unorthodox suggestions for how to pop the question. The guys reflect on their own less-than-amazing proposals at the warehouse, and Si invites himself to pitch a beard camouflage device to Sadie's business class. Jase surprises Reed and Brighton by throwing a party for the whole family and re-proposing to Missy to celebrate 25 years of marriage.
105	4	"Father Knows Pest"	July 13, 2016	1.54
When the president of Jase and Missy's homeowners' association asks Jase to get rid of a wild beaver running loose in the neighborhood, he brings in Mia for backup. The hunt succeeds, and Jase leverages favors out of the president in exchange for not leaving the carcass on his porch. Lil' Will tests Willie and Si to see which one is better qualified to teach him to drive - first on the road, then in an obstacle-filled go kart race - and eventually decides to get help from John Luke instead.
106	5	"Wild Wild West Monroe"	July 20, 2016	1.19
Jase and Jep set up a shooting competition to decide which of them should get their grandfather's rifle. After Jase wins one round with his shotgun and Jep wins another with his powerful long-range rifle, they use a cowboy action shooting showdown to break the tie. Rebecca is nervous about taking her fiance John Reed to meet her family in Taiwan, so Willie and Korie offer to let them practice engagement customs at home.
107	6	"Half in the Bag"	July 20, 2016	1.22
Willie and Korie get a surprise when they find Si working part-time as a bagger at the local grocery store. After his poor performance gets him fired, the guys arrange a bagging competition to help him win his job back. A chipped tooth stirs up Willie's long-standing fear of visiting the dentist; he tries to keep it a secret from Korie, but she finds out and teams up with Bella to get him to go.
108	7	"There Will Be Flood"	July 27, 2016	1.31
A huge rainstorm and flooded roads strand Willie and most of the adults at Phil and Miss Kay's house, where they pass time during a power outage by reminiscing about their childhood. As Jessica and Sadie take charge of babysitting the younger children, Jessica finds herself wrangling Jep's chickens from their coop into the house. The guys hurry to protect the warehouse inventory from leaks in the roof, then raid Willie's office safe for food and have fun goofing off until he catches them in the act.
109	8	"Bingo Star"	July 27, 2016	1.46
Willie drives Miss Kay to a bingo tournament and is surprised at the intensity of the players - including Si, who is supposed to be at work. After being heckled as a caller and seeing Si win $2,000, he joins the game only to embarrass himself and Miss Kay with his boisterous ineptitude. In the wake of the previous episode's storm, Jase and Jep take the children to play football in a muddy field, with Willie, Korie, and Sadie cheerfully joining the game for the second half.
110	9	"Sadie's Choice"	August 3, 2016	1.15
As Sadie and Cole prepare to graduate from high school, Willie takes Sadie on a tour of the University of Louisiana at Monroe, hoping to persuade her to attend business school at his alma mater. She is more interested in the drama program, though, and she ropes Willie and Si into a highly unorthodox read-through from King Lear during an acting class. When John Luke and Mary Kate come home for a surprise visit, Phil, Jase, and Jep take them squirrel hunting, but Mary Kate quickly learns that she would much rather eat the game than clean it.
111	10	"Children of the Cornbread"	August 3, 2016	1.21
A debate over whether Miss Kay or Missy makes better cornbread turns into a taste-test challenge between their recipes and that of Alan's wife Lisa. Willie, Jase, and Alan judge the entries, only to end up in a three-way tie and spark a new cook-off among the Robertson wives - with Mountain Man as the judge and Korie throwing in a twist of her own. The guys tell Si about deer antler supplements that can give him more energy, but their prank to make him think he is getting stronger backfires after he overhears it and turns the tables.
112	11	"Whole Lotta Bull"	August 10, 2016	1.14
Wanting to indulge his childhood cowboy fantasy, Jase invites the guys to attend a one-day rodeo camp with him. The events turn out to be harder than expected, but they enjoy putting on an exhibition for their families and friends. When Willie has to take Miss Kay and Bobo to a "date" with a friend's dog, he is dumbfounded at both their size difference and how seriously Miss Kay talks about their relationship.
113	12	"Here Comes the Son"	August 10, 2016	1.04
After Willie's doctor suggests that he try to reduce his blood pressure, Korie starts cooking healthy food for him and makes him ride a bicycle to work. He tries to outsmart her at first, but changes his mind after she catches him eating barbecue ribs with a little help from Bella. Having left college to pursue a music career, Reed starts working part-time at the warehouse and finds himself facing a dilemma when Willie offers to hire him full-time.
114	13	"Bro'd Trip"	August 17, 2016	1.33
Willie takes Jase to Arkansas for a sales pitch of the company's new line of turkey calls. Jase drives him to distraction during the trip, including booking them into a run-down motel for the night, and his plan to demonstrate the calls on a live turkey makes a mess of both the carpet and the client's order. Left in charge of the warehouse, Jep inadvertently sends out a package intended for Willie in an order the guys have packed up. After a scramble to the local shipping depots, they recover the package with a little help from one of Si's old friends - and find it to be a bag of golf tees.
115	14	"Techs and Balances"	August 24, 2016	1.24
Willie thinks Korie and the children are spending too much time on their phones, so he calls for the family to spend one day free of all technology. A planned fishing trip falls victim to old maps, his sons' inability to read them, and his own need to know how the LSU football game is going. After the guys pick up a head lice infestation from goofing around with Jep's new hat, Miss Kay shows up with a homemade remedy pungent enough to make them think the lice might not be so bad after all.

=== Season 11 (2016–2017) ===
No. overall	No. in season	Title	Original release date	US viewers (millions)
116	1	"The West Monroe Wing"	November 16, 2016	1.29
Willie nominates Jase for president of the homeowners' association as a joke, then enters the race himself in order to head off Jase's plan to repeal all the rules. The race takes its own bizarre turns as the brothers lobby for votes and find out how much work comes with the job. Jep offers to install a duck-viewing blind at the local zoo, but the project veers into ego-stroking when he has Miss Kay paint an exaggerated mural of himself and the guys for it.
117	2	"Automation Frustration"	November 23, 2016	0.97
Willie's purchase of a 3-D printer gives the guys an excuse to make toys and goof around at work. When he confiscates it and starts making prototype duck calls, though, they start to worry that this technology will take over their jobs and have to do what they dread most - actual work. After Si offers to invest in John Luke's snow cone stand against Willie's advice, he commandeers the business and cooks up some bizarre soup recipes.
118	3	"Razing the Snakes"	November 30, 2016	1.05
After a cottonmouth kills Miss Kay's pet squirrel, she puts Jase in charge of hunting and killing it. He rounds up Cole, Jep, and Si for the job, which expands into a full-scale assault on the swamp with the help of napalm, dynamite, and Jep's radio-controlled truck. Puzzled by Rebecca's business strategy, Willie visits her boutique and gets pulled into a promotional photo shoot along with Jase, Jep, and Si.
119	4	"Uneasy Rider"	December 7, 2016	1.18
Willie takes Lil' Will shopping for his first car, but the qualities they want (practical/affordable vs. sporty) and Lil' Will's desire for a motorcycle leave them at an impasse. Parents and kids team up to outmaneuver each other, with Korie helping Willie and John Luke on Lil' Will's side. Jase's idea for a "flying" duck decoy on a zip-line sends the guys to the swamp for a field test, with him doing most of the dirty work, and thoroughly fails to impress Willie. Note: This episode shares its title with Charlie Daniels' 1973 hit narrative-song "Uneasy Rider."
120	5	"Good Willie Hunting"	December 14, 2016	1.12
An argument over whether Willie or Jase is the better tracker leads to a manhunt challenge. As Willie and Jep try to avoid capture by Jase and Si, Willie employs an arsenal of sneaky tricks only to find a big surprise waiting for him at the end of the course. Korie, Missy, and the older kids help with a charity project in Uganda, where John Luke finds the language barrier to be rather less imposing than he thinks.
121	6	"Sleep Cover"	December 21, 2016	1.11
While still in Uganda, Korie reminds Willie that he has to host a sleepover for Bella and her friends. An interruption by a couple of boys from Bella's school brings Willie, Jep, and the girls together to even the score and have a little fun along the way. Jase takes the guys out for a round of nighttime golf, with a donut run at stake, but ends up owing the course manager a lot more when he overstays his welcome in pursuit of a good score.
122	7	"Drive-In Revivin'"	December 28, 2016	1.30
While advising Lil' Will on ways to win a girl's heart, Willie decides to demonstrate by doing something romantic for Korie without spending any money. He mobilizes the guys to put together a drive-in movie theater on the family land, impressing Korie with his resourcefulness. Jase's doubts about Missy's ability as a matchmaker leads them to make a wager over who can find a better romantic interest for Mountain Man, but his eventual choice catches both of them flat-footed.
123	8	"Fishful Thinking"	January 4, 2017	1.01
Jase goes against Jep in a company-sponsored bass fishing tournament, bringing in Si and the guest of honor - professional fisherman Bill Dance - to fill out his team. Si spends the day telling Bill outrageous stories and looking for a mythical giant bass, driving Jase crazy in his push to win. Bill's comments on Willie's graying beard prompt him to try dyeing it, with the family's help and a slight color miscue along the way.
124	9	"When Doves Fry"	January 11, 2017	1.03
Short of manpower for a dove hunt on the first day of the season, Jase strikes a deal to get Jep, Mia, and Merritt to come along. Heat and a lack of doves derail the hunt, and the group's visit to an escape room game facility goes wrong after Jase takes the "escape" part a little too seriously. When Willie buys a deuce-and-a-half truck, Si commandeers it to give "official" tours of the company grounds and runs it out of gas on Willie's lawn.
125	10	"Carpnado"	January 18, 2017	1.19
Si's decision to go fishing leads the guys to a canal infested with Asian carp - an invasive species, and a safety hazard to boaters due to their strong jumping. The guys spend the day catching all they can, then try to find a way to make them edible with help from Miss Kay. The recipe is put to the test when Willie finds himself facing an unexpected capacity crowd at the diner and chaos in the kitchen caused by Si's antics.
126	11	"The Campfire Diaries"	March 1, 2017	1.05
The Robertsons band together to renovate a tennis court that Willie built at their favorite summer camp 20 years ago. Si and the brothers quickly get on each other's nerves in their cabin, Jep leads the kids in an unauthorized swimming break and winds up on lifeguard duty, and Reed and Cole manage to drop a dead tree squarely onto the court while felling it. With the help of a construction crew, they get the court cleaned and restored for future campers to enjoy.
127	12	"Rowdy's Big Day"	March 8, 2017	0.98
Willie sets up a huge surprise party to celebrate Rowdy's adoption becoming official, with all his favorite activities and a welcome into the Robertson clan from the other children. Impressed by the results of a house-call massage to loosen his stiff muscles, Jase spreads the word among the guys and commandeers the masseuse at Missy's spa to look after them at the warehouse.
128	13	"Disappearing Acts"	March 15, 2017	0.95
Jep takes a crash course in magic so he can perform at Gus's first birthday party, with Martin and Godwin as assistants, but the show ends up with a few unexpected rough edges. Willie and Jase double back to the snow cone truck where Willie left Si's favorite cup, only to find the truck gone. None of the new cups they buy for him measures up to his standards, and he insists that they scour the city for his lost one.
129	14	"Dance Dads"	March 22, 2017	1.00
With Reed and Brighton's wedding coming up, Jase and Missy take dancing lessons from Sadie. Korie decides that she and Willie could use a refresher of their own to keep from embarrassing themselves after the ceremony. Jase's plans to officiate nearly fall through because his state certification has expired, but Reed helps him renew it online just in time.
130	15	"End of an Era"	March 29, 2017	1.51
Willie, Korie, and the guys confront Si about his sudden unusual behavior around the warehouse and learn that he has started pursuing a music career in his off-hours. He plans to retire from Duck Commander and wants a huge going-away party, taking time first to show Jep, Martin, and Godwin the secrets he has hidden around the warehouse - including a fully stocked "nap fort." Willie, Jase, and Phil want to make one of Si's favorite duck calls from 25 years ago as a gift, but they have to go to Mississippi to have a new mold made for it. A walk around the workshop brings back memories of the company's early years. Si insists on a bigger stage than the loading dock Korie wants to use, saying that he needs the space so that he and his backing band can perform. On the day of the party, Willie hosts a comedy roast of Si - who proceeds to surprise everyone by bringing in ZZ Top as his band. Willie gives him the first duck call from the workshop's new production run; after the party, he sneaks into the duck call room and steals his favorite chair as an additional souvenir of his time at Duck Commander.
131	16	"Looking Back and Talking Quack"	April 5, 2017	0.94
Note: The one-hour series finale. This is also the final episode to feature Phil Robertson after his death on May 25, 2025.
