= Duck Family Treasure =

American reality television series

- Promotional Poster for Season 1
- Genre: Documentary; Reality; Christian
- Developed by: Fox Entertainment; Duck Commander
- Starring: Murry Crowe; Jase Robertson; Jep Robertson; Si Robertson
- Country of origin: United States
- Original language: English
- No. of seasons: 4
- No. of episodes: 40 + 1 Special

Production
- Executive producers: Korie Robertson; Chris Richardson; Marc Pierce; Zach Dasher
- Production locations: Monroe and West Monroe, Louisiana
- Running time: 38–40 minutes
- Production companies: Fox Entertainment; Duck Commander; Warm Springs Productions; Tread Lively

Original release
- Network: Fox Nation
- Release: June 19, 2022 – present

Related
- Duck Commander series Duck Dynasty; Duck Dynasty: The Revival; Jep & Jessica: Growing the Dynasty; At Home with the Robertsons; Going Si-ral

Duck Family Treasure is an American reality television series from Fox that premiered in 2022 on Fox Nation, produced by Warm Springs Productions in collaboration with Tread Lively. It chronicles the metal detecting activities of Murry Crowe, Jase Robertson and Jep Robertson, with the Robertsons' Uncle Si directing them from The Duck Call Room podcast studio at Duck Commander. The show contains educational entertainment by highlighting historic sites and natural wonders, including those related to the National Park Service.

== Locations ==
Region	Locations (season number)
Southern	Kentucky (2), Louisiana (1, 2, 3, 4), Maryland (3), Mississippi (3), North Carolina (3), South Carolina (2), Tennessee (2, 3), Texas (1, 2), Virginia (2, 4)
Midwest	Kansas (1)
Northeastern	(New York (state)) New York (3)
Western	Montana (3), Wyoming(3)

== Premise ==
Treasure hunter Murry Crowe is joined by Robertson brothers Jase and Jep of Duck Commander, as they metal detect various locations. United by a shared passion for the hunt, the trio embarks on expeditions to unearth hidden treasures using metal detecting technology. Their collaboration was sparked when Crowe, facing a diagnosis of cancer, invited the brothers to join him on one of his quests. Leveraging Murry's innovative engineering skills, they employ state-of-the-art equipment designed specifically for their treasure-seeking endeavors. The primary plot features various nationwide adventures of Murry, Jase, and Jep, usually with a subplot involving the Robertson's Uncle Si humorously managing various aspects of the endeavors from their hometown of West Monroe. The show also incorporates aspects of reality series Duck Dynasty, such as cameos from that show and expanding on events that have transpired since then.

== Episodes ==
=== Series overview ===
Season	Episodes	Originally released	
Season	Episodes	First released	Last released
1	10	June 19, 2022	June 26, 2022
2	10	June 11, 2023	December 1, 2023
3	10	July 26, 2024	December 14, 2024
4	10	June 14, 2025	June 16, 2026

=== Season 1 ===
No. overall	No. in season	Title	Original release date	U.S. viewers (millions) (Note: Only for television broadcast on FoxNation)
1	1	"Always Hunting Something"	June 19, 2022	N/A
2	2	"Welcome Home!"	June 19, 2022	N/A
3	3	"Mrs. Ball and Mrs. Chain"	June 19, 2022	N/A
4	4	"The Buzzards are Circling"	June 19, 2022	N/A
5	5	"Steamboat Fever"	June 19, 2022	N/A
6	6	"Meteorites!"	June 26, 2022	N/A
7	7	"Mama's Boy"	June 26, 2022	N/A
8	8	"The Thrill of the Hunt"	June 26, 2022	N/A
9	9	"Home of the Brave"	June 26, 2022	N/A
10	10	"#mensnightout"	June 26, 2022	N/A

=== Season 2 ===
No. overall	No. in season	Title	Original release date	U.S. viewers (millions) (Note: Only for television broadcast on FoxNation)
11	1	"Lucky Lawnmower"	June 11, 2023	N/A
12	2	"Welcome to the Jungle!"	June 11, 2023	N/A
13	3	"Loved, Chosen and Treasured"	June 11, 2023	N/A
14	4	"Quail Fever"	June 11, 2023	N/A
15	5	"I Believe!"	June 11, 2023	N/A
16	6	"Battle of the Assistants"	December 1, 2023	N/A
17	7	"Ghost Hunt"	December 1, 2023	N/A
18	8	"Something Old"	December 1, 2023	N/A
19	9	"Bullet Bonanza"	December 1, 2023	N/A
20	10	"A Duck Family Christmas"	December 1, 2023	N/A

=== Season 3 ===
No. overall	No. in season	Title	Original release date	U.S. viewers (millions) (Note: Only for television broadcast on FoxNation)
21	1	"This One's for Murray"	July 26, 2024	N/A
22	2	"The Treasure State"	July 26, 2024	N/A
23	3	"New York, New York"	July 26, 2024	N/A
24	4	"The Treasure Box"	July 26, 2024	N/A
25	5	"Everybody's Got a Guy"	July 26, 2024	N/A
26	6	"Treasure with Feathers"	December 14, 2024	N/A
27	7	"Birthday Fever"	December 14, 2024	N/A
28	8	"Si the Spy"	December 14, 2024	N/A
29	9	"When Willie is Away"	December 14, 2024	N/A
30	10	"Battleground"	December 14, 2024	N/A

=== Season 4 ===
No. overall	No. in season	Title	Original release date	U.S. viewers (millions) (Note: Only for television broadcast on FoxNation)
31	1	"Bonnie and Clyde"	June 15, 2025	N/A
32	2	"Virginia is for Diggers"	June 22, 2025	N/A
33	3	"Treasure Comes in Various Forms"	June 29, 2025	N/A
34	4	"One of Life's Biggest Treasures"	July 6, 2025	N/A
35	5	"Family is the Greatest Treasure"	July 13, 2025	N/A
36	6	"Missing Town of Adamsburg"	June 16, 2026	N/A
37	7	"Oregon Trail"	June 16, 2026	N/A
38	8	"Texas Ghost Town"	June 16, 2026	N/A
39	9	"Town of Mer Rouge"	June 16, 2026	N/A
40	10	"Merry-Land"	June 16, 2026	N/A

== Release ==
The first episode was released on VOD platform Fox Nation on June 19, 2022, and was also broadcast on Fox News. The first season was released in two batches on Fox Nation during late June 2022. The first batch of the second season premiered on June 11, 2023, with the second batch set to premiere in December 2023.

Fox Business began to syndicate the first season of the series, starting on October 20, 2022, as a part of their Fox Business Prime programming block. Fox Nation's entertainment productions are part of a multi-year Fox Television Stations distribution agreement, for syndication options of Duck Family Treasure, Sharon Osbourne's To Hell & Back documentary, and Kevin Costner's Yellowstone: One-Fifty documentary about Yellowstone National Park.
