= Kay Robertson =

American reality television actress

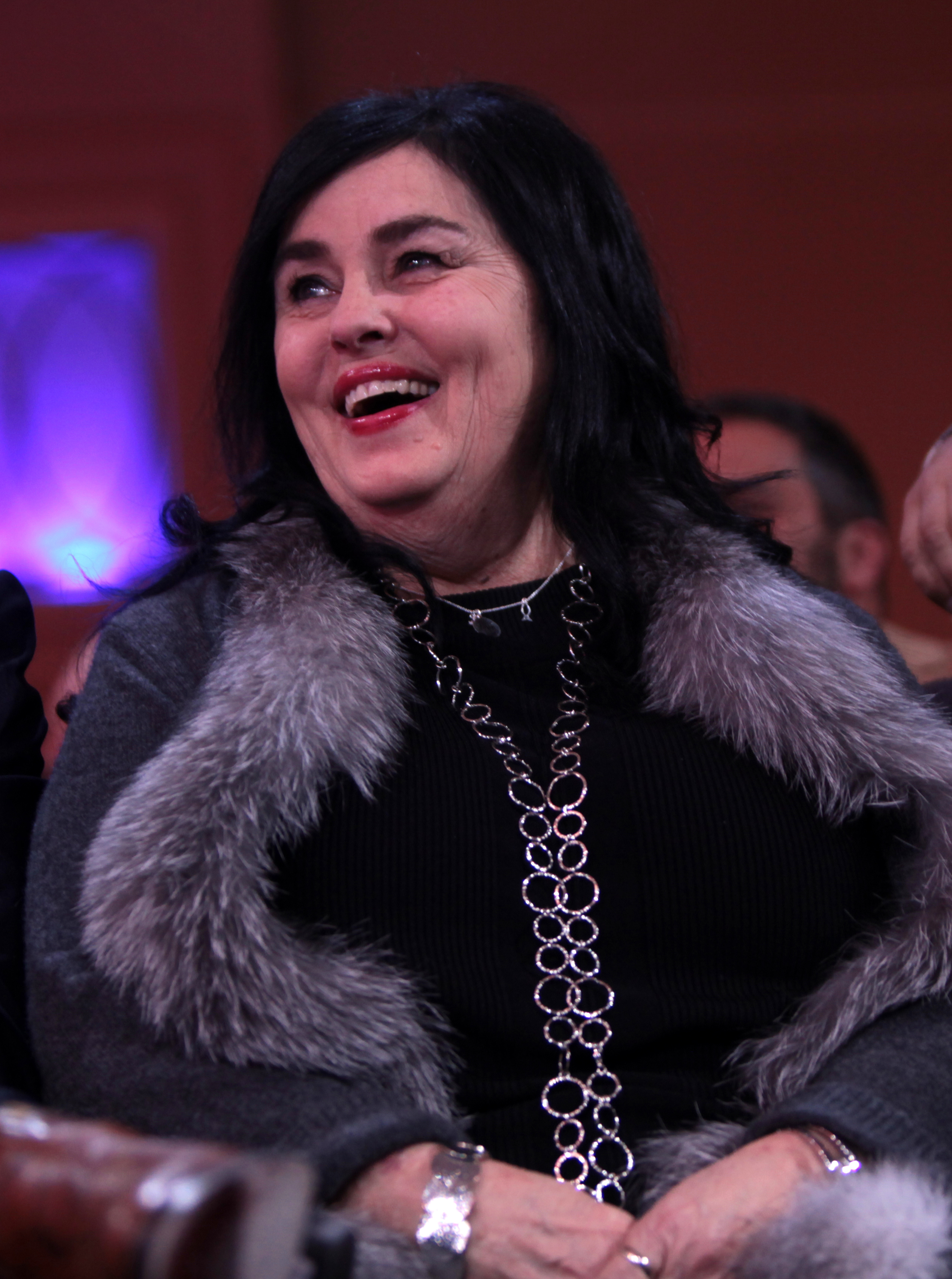
- Kay Robertson in 2015
- Born: Marsha Kay Carroway; December 21, 1947 (age 78); West Monroe, Louisiana, U.S.
- Other name: Miss Kay
- Occupation: Television personality
- Years active: 1972–present
- Television: Duck Dynasty
- Spouse: Phil Robertson (m. 1966; died 2025)
- Children: 4, including Jase and Willie
- Relatives: Korie Robertson (daughter-in-law); Sadie Robertson (granddaughter)

Marsha Kay Carroway Robertson (born December 21, 1947), also known as Miss Kay, is an American television personality, best known for her appearances on the A&E reality series Duck Dynasty.

Robertson is the widow of entrepreneur and Duck Dynasty co-star Phil Robertson, and mother of Duck Dynasty personality and current Duck Commander CEO Willie Robertson.

She has a passion and talent for cooking, and often has her entire family over for a home-cooked meal after a long day's work. She is the author of the cookbook Miss Kay's Duck Commander Kitchen: Faith, Family, and Food--Bringing Our Home to Your Table.

== Personal life ==
In high school, Kay was a cheerleader and a debutante.

Kay and Phil Robertson began dating in 1964 and married two years later. They have four sons: Alan, Jase, Willie, and Jep, as well as 16 grandchildren and several great-grandchildren.

In June 2021, Robertson was attacked by her pet dog, Bobo, resulting in damage to her mouth and lips. She reported that she was on a liquid diet and that she would need reconstructive surgery to repair her lips in the future.

In 2023, Willie, Kay’s son, and Korie Robertson, his wife, released a film titled, The Blind. The film centers on the story of Kay and her husband Phil Robertson and their life. A major theme in the film is Phil Robertson's struggle with alcohol and infidelity and how God saved their family.

== Bibliography ==
- Miss Kay's Duck Commander Kitchen: Faith, Family, and Food – Bringing Our Home to Your Table (co-written with Chrys Howard). Simon & Schuster. (2013); ISBN 9781476763200
