= Sadie Robertson Huff =

American television personality (born 1997)

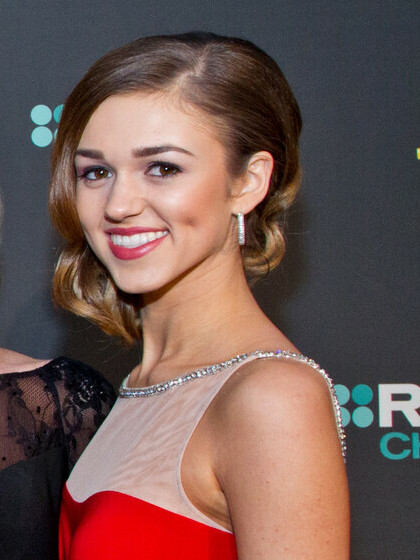
- Robertson in February 2015
- Born: Sadie Carroway Robertson; June 11, 1997 (age 29); Monroe, Louisiana, U.S.
- Education: Ouachita Christian High School
- Occupations: Television personality, author, actress
- Years active: 2012–present
- Television: Duck Dynasty; Dancing with the Stars; Hallmark Channel
- Spouse: Christian Huff (m. 2019)
- Children: 3
- Parents: Willie Robertson (father); Korie Robertson (mother)
- Relatives: Phil Robertson (grandfather); Kay Robertson (grandmother); Jase Robertson (uncle); Si Robertson (great uncle)

Sadie Carroway Robertson Huff (née Robertson; born June 11, 1997) is an American Christian speaker, actress, businesswoman, podcaster, and author. She rose to fame on the A&E reality television show Duck Dynasty. She is a prominent Christian social media personality, host of WHOA, That's Good podcast, and founder of the ministry Live Original.

== Early life ==
Robertson Huff is a granddaughter of Phil Robertson, founder of Duck Commander. Her parents are Korie Robertson (née Howard) and Willie Robertson, the company's current CEO. She has five siblings: John Luke Robertson, Rebecca Loflin, Willie Robertson Jr., Bella Robertson-Mayo, and Rowdy Robertson.

== Career ==
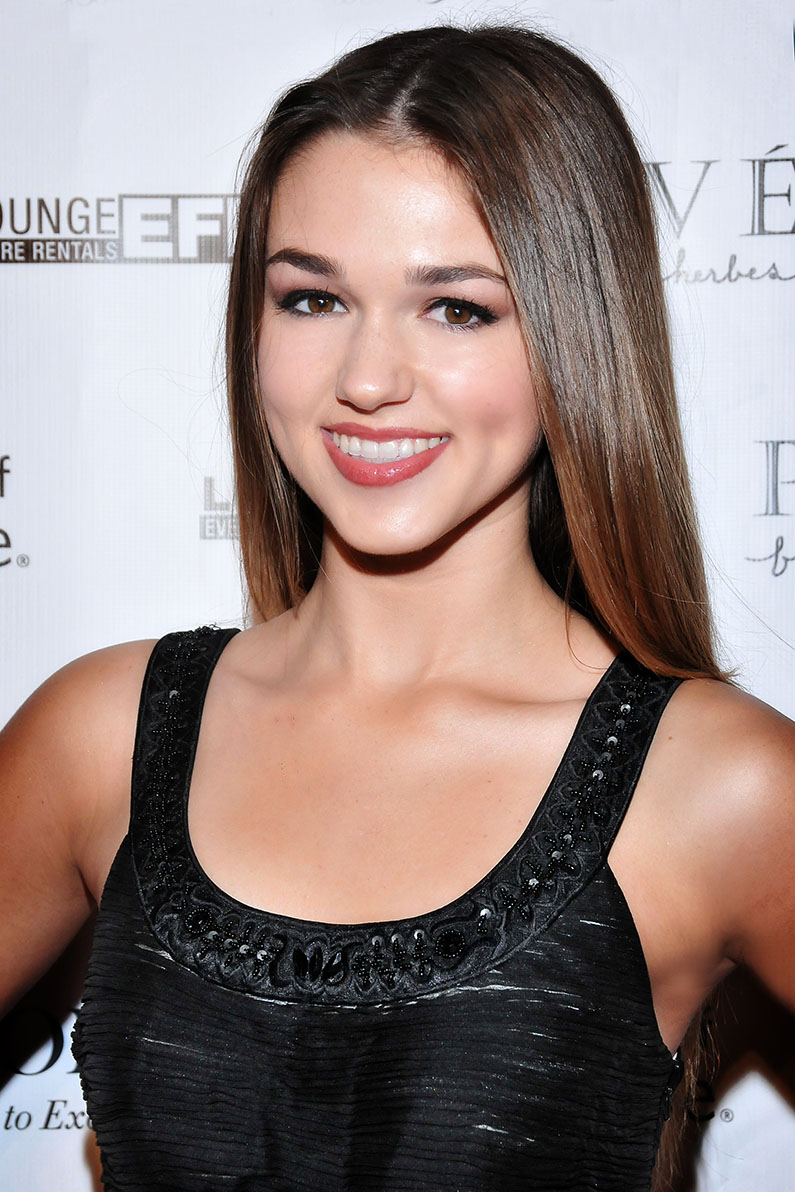
Robertson in 2014

She sang Away in a Manger with Alison Krauss for her family's bestselling album, Duck the Halls: A Robertson Family Christmas.

Robertson Huff was the runner-up on Season 19 of Dancing with the Stars. Robertson Huff has appeared in two films God's Not Dead 2 and I'm Not Ashamed, and launched her successful speaking and worship tour, Live Original, in the fall of 2016.

Robertson Huff speaks at Passion Christian Conference every January.

Robertson Huff partnered with Roma Boots and worked alongside them in their mission to "give poverty the boot."

In 2014, Robertson Huff wrote a New York Times Best Seller book about faith and Christian values called Live Original. She released a sequel to her first book, Live Original, called Live Fearless, in 2018 and in 2020 released Live: Remain Alive, Be Alive at a Specified Time, Have an Exciting or Fulfilling Life. This book encourages readers to thrive in God-given life, find confidence, deal with haters, live in the moment, discover the power of words, and wholeheartedly embrace God's ways so they can make the best choices.

In 2021, Robertson Huff signed a deal to be part of a TV series titled, Life Just Got Real, with producer Brad Krevoy. The series idea was adapted from her book, Life Just Got Real, which was published in 2016. Robertson Huff would appear on the show, however, her main role would be that of producer.

Live on Purpose: 100 Devotionals for Letting Go of Fear and Following God was released in September 2021 and in February 2022, she published Who Are You Following?: Pursuing Jesus in a Social-Media Obsessed World. She co wrote a book with her husband entitled How to Put Love First: Find Meaningful Connection with God, Your People, and Your Community (2023).

In February 2024, it was announced that Robertson Huff would be the commencement speaker at the University of Mount Olive 2024 graduation.

== Personal life ==
In 2018, Robertson Huff dated Outer Banks actor Austin North for four months.

On June 9, 2019, Robertson Huff became engaged to Christian Huff. They married on November 25, 2019. On October 4, 2020, the couple announced that they were expecting their first child, a girl. On May 11, 2021, Robertson Huff gave birth to their daughter. On November 3, 2022, they announced that they were expecting their second child. Their daughter was born on May 22, 2023. On February 14, 2025, they announced that she was expecting their third child. On August 1, 2025, the couple welcomed their third child, a daughter.

== Filmography ==
Film
Year	Title	Role	Notes
2016	God's Not Dead 2	Marlene	
2016	I'm Not Ashamed	Charity	
2017	Past the Past	Sadie	Short film
2017	Sun, Sand, & Romance	Chloe	Television film

Television
Year	Title	Role	Notes
2012–2017	Duck Dynasty	Herself	
2013	CollegeHumor Originals	Kid	Episode: "Billy Crystal and John Goodman Meet Their Monsters"
2014	Dancing with the Stars	Herself	Contestant on season 19
2025–present	Duck Dynasty: The Revival	Herself	

Music videos
Year	Song	Artist	Role
2017	"Past the Past"	Lawson Bates	Herself
2018	"The Long Way"	Brett Eldredge	Herself

== Dancing with the Stars ==
In 2014, she was a celebrity competitor on Dancing with the Stars: season 19. She paired with professional dancer Mark Ballas and finished the competition in second place behind Alfonso Ribeiro.

=== Performance history ===
Week	Dance / Song	Judges' scores				Result
Week	Dance / Song	Inaba	Goodman	Hough	Tonioli	Result
1	Cha-cha-cha / "Birthday"	8	8	9	9	Safe
2	Jazz / "She's Country"	8	7	8	8	Safe
3	Viennese Waltz / "Married Life"	8	8^{1}	8	8	Safe
4	Samba / "Hunter"	9	9^{2}	10	9	Safe
5^{3}	Charleston / "Crazy Stupid Love"	9	9^{4}	9	9	No elimination
6	Rumba / "Diamonds"	9	10^{5}	8	8	Safe
7	Paso doble / "Come with Me Now"; Team Freestyle / "Time Warp"	7; 8	7; 8	8; 8	8; 8	Safe
8	Contemporary / "Uninvited"; Cha-cha-cha Dance-Off / "Really Don't Care"	9 No	9 extra	10 points	10 awarded	Safe
9	Jive / "1, 2, 3 Turnaround"; Trio Foxtrot / "Can't Take My Eyes Off You"	8; 10	9; 10	8; 10	8; 10	Last to be called safe
10; Semi-finals	Quickstep / "Problem"; Argentine tango / "Problem" (acoustic version)	9; 9	10; 9	9; 10	9; 9	Last to be called safe
11; Finals	Samba / "Hunter"; Freestyle / "Super Mario Bros. theme" Samba & Quickstep Fusion / "Nitty Gritty"	10; 10; 10	9; 10; 10	10; 10; 10	9; 10; 10	Runner-up
^{1}Score given by guest judge Kevin Hart in place of Goodman.^{2}The American public scored the dance in place of Goodman with the averaged score being counted alongside the three other judges.^{3}This week only, for "Partner Switch-Up" week, Robertson performed with Derek Hough instead of Ballas.^{4}Score given by guest judge Jessie J in place of Goodman.^{5}Score given by guest judge Pitbull in place of Goodman.

== Bibliography ==
- Live Original. Howard Books, 2015. ISBN 978-1476777818, with Beth Clark.
- Live Original Devotional. Howard Books, 2016. ISBN 978-1501126512.
- Life Just Got Real: A Live Original Novel. Howard Books, 2016. ISBN 9781501126499 with Cindy Coloma.
- Live Fearless. Thomas Nelson, 2018. ISBN 978-1400309399, with Beth Clark.
- Live. Thomas Nelson, 2020. ISBN 978-1400213061, with Beth Clark.
- Live on Purpose. Thomas Nelson, 2021. ISBN 978-1400213092
- Who are you Following? Thomas Nelson, 2022. ISBN 978-0785289913
- How to Put Love First: Find Meaningful Connection with God, Your People and Your Community. Thomas Nelson, 2023. ISBN 9781400228645 with Christian Huff.
