= Jase Robertson =

American tv personality (b.1969)

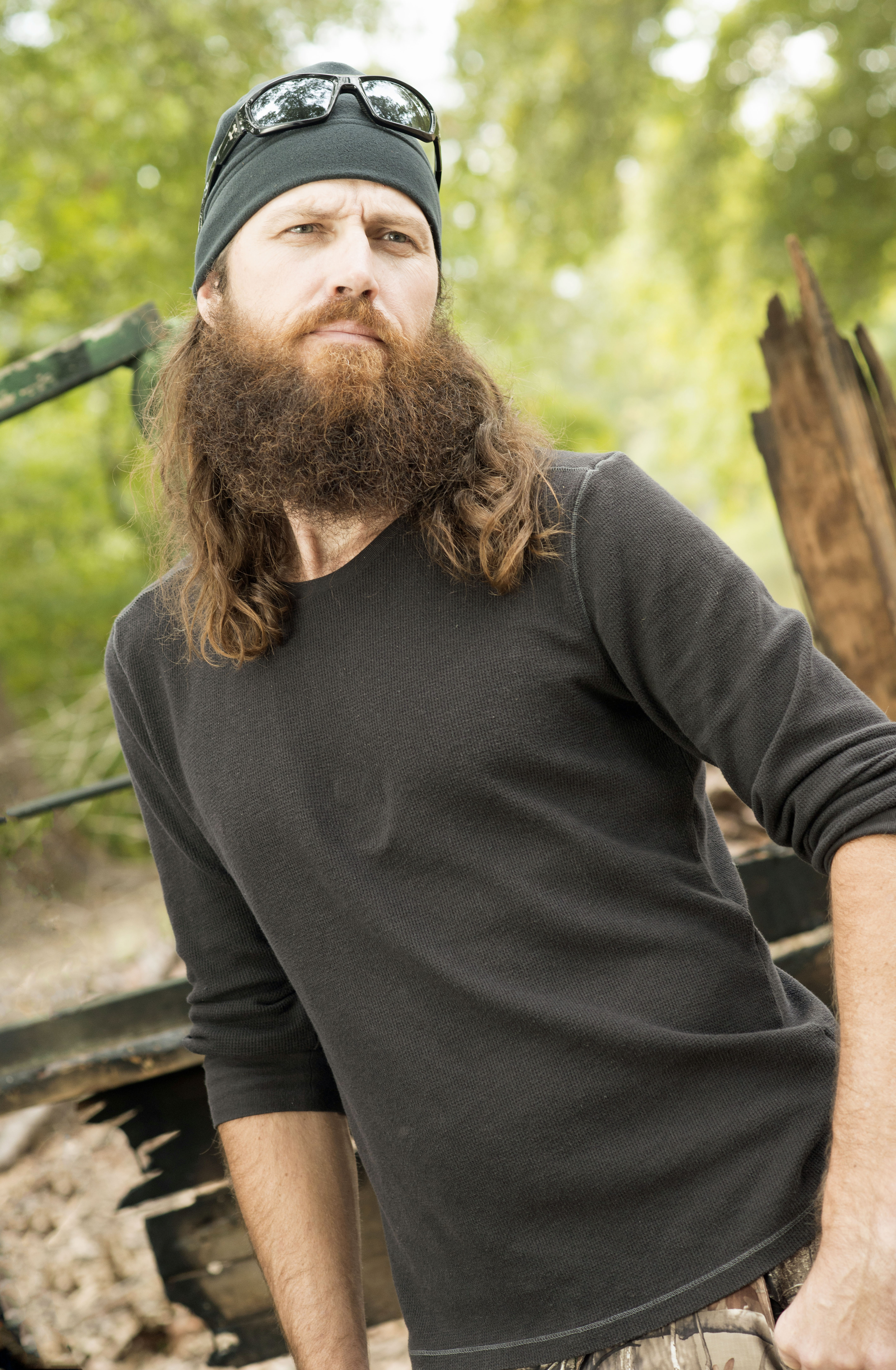
- Robertson in 2013
- Born: Jason Silas Robertson; August 16, 1969 (age 57); Ruston, Louisiana, U.S.
- Occupations: businessman, television personality
- Television: Duck Dynasty; Duck Family Treasure
- Spouse: Melissa Robertson (m. 1990)
- Children: 4
- Parent(s): Phil Robertson; Kay Robertson
- Relatives: Willie Robertson (brother); Silas Robertson (uncle); Sadie Robertson (niece)

Jason Silas Robertson (born August 16, 1969) is an American television personality, businessman, and professional duck hunter. He developed several of Duck Commander's duck calls, and co-starred in the A&E reality television show Duck Dynasty and Fox Entertainment's Duck Family Treasure. He was the co-host of the podcast Unashamed alongside his father Phil Robertson and brother Alan.

== Biography ==
Robertson and his wife Missy have three children.

Robertson was previously the COO of Duck Commander where he invented & fabricated the company's duck calls.

== Television and film ==
Robertson is one of the stars of A&E's reality show Duck Dynasty.

His childhood self was portrayed by Sawyer Jesse Mixon in the 2023 film The Blind.
