= Phil Robertson =

American hunter, businessman and reality television star (1946–2025)

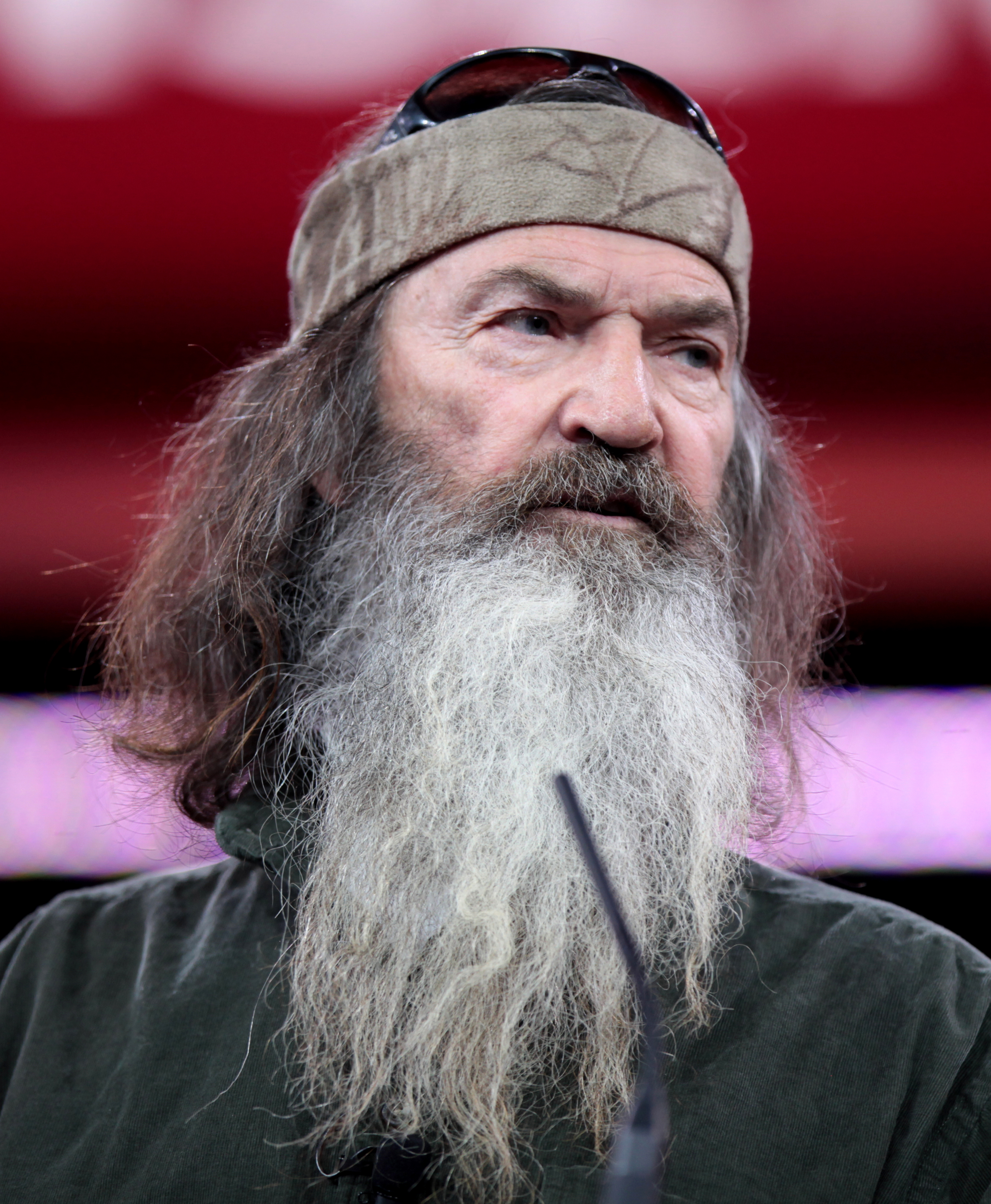
- Robertson speaking at CPAC in 2015
- Born: Phil Alexander Robertson; April 24, 1946; Vivian, Louisiana, U.S.
- Died: May 25, 2025 (aged 79); West Monroe, Louisiana, U.S.
- Education: Louisiana Tech University (BS, MEd)
- Occupations: Hunter, businessman, reality television star
- Years active: 1972–2025
- Television: Duck Dynasty
- Political party: Republican
- Spouse: Marsha Kay Carroway (m. 1966)
- Children: 5, including Jase and Willie
- Relatives: Si Robertson (brother); Korie Robertson (daughter-in-law); Sadie Robertson (granddaughter)

Phil Alexander Robertson (April 24, 1946 – May 25, 2025) was an American professional hunter, businessman and television personality who was the founder of hunting products company Duck Commander. A reality television star on the popular television series Duck Dynasty, he was also featured on the television show Duck Commander, a hunting program on the Outdoor Channel. He served as patriarch of the Duck Dynasty Robertson family.

Robertson attended Louisiana Tech University, where he played football. He received a master's degree in education and spent several years teaching prior to founding Duck Commander, a hunting equipment company.

He was the subject of controversy after a 2013 interview he did with GQ magazine, where he said that homosexual behavior was sinful. As a result, A&E suspended him from Duck Dynasty. Facing a strong backlash from his supporters, A&E lifted the suspension after nine days.

In September 2023, a biographical film on the early life of Robertson, The Blind, was released in theaters.

== Early life and education ==
Robertson was born in Vivian, Louisiana, on April 24, 1946. He was the fifth of seven children of Merritt (née Hale) and James Robertson. Because of financial setbacks during his childhood, the family lived in rugged conditions, having no electricity, toilet or bathtub. The family rarely went into town to buy groceries, and instead "lived off of the fruits and vegetables they grew in their garden; the meat from deer, squirrels, fish, and other game they hunted and fished; and the pigs, chickens, and cattle they raised".

In his book Happy, Happy, Happy, Robertson recalls that "It was the 1950s when I was a young boy, but we lived like it was the 1850s ... but we were always happy, happy, happy no matter the circumstances."

Halfway between Vivian and Hosston is Robertson's restored log cabin birth home. The property is owned by Robertson's cousin, Nathan Hale.

=== College and football ===
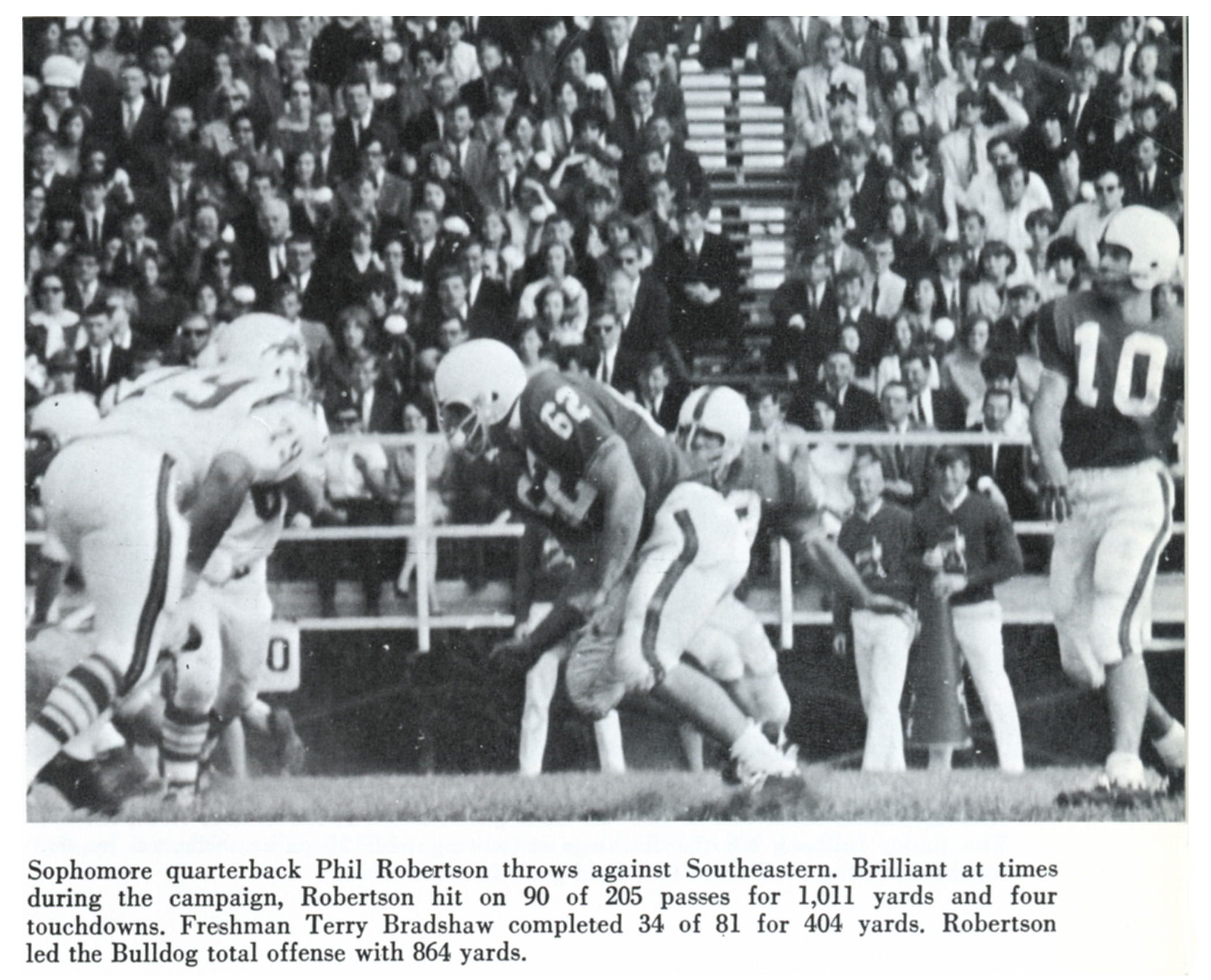
Robertson throws against the Southeastern Louisiana Lions.

As an athlete in high school, Robertson was all-state in football, baseball, and track, which afforded him the opportunity to attend Louisiana Tech in Ruston on a football scholarship in the late 1960s. At Tech, he played first-string quarterback for the Bulldogs, ahead of Pro Football Hall of Famer Terry Bradshaw, the first overall pick in the 1970 NFL draft. When he arrived at Tech in 1966, Bradshaw caused a media frenzy on account of his reputation of being a football sensation from nearby Shreveport. Robertson was a year ahead of Bradshaw, and was the starter for two seasons in 1966 and 1967, and chose not to play in 1968.

At Louisiana Tech Robertson completed 179 of 411 passing attempts for 2,237 yards. He threw 12 touchdowns, but had 34 interceptions. It was thought Robertson had the potential for a pro career, but he was more interested in hunting. Bradshaw said of Robertson's love of hunting that "Phil Robertson, loved hunting more than he loved football. He'd come to practice directly from the woods, squirrel tails hanging out of his pockets, duck feathers on his clothes. Clearly he was a fine shot, so no one complained too much." When approached to play professionally for the Washington Redskins, Robertson declined because playing football would conflict with his hunting. Additionally, football was only about completing his scholarship to him, while Bradshaw practically lived and breathed the sport. Robertson put it this way: "Terry went for the bucks, and I chased after the ducks."

Robertson later received a bachelor's degree in physical education and a master's in education.

== Career ==
=== Before Duck Commander ===
Robertson initially taught school for several years before becoming a commercial fisherman. He lived in a trailer and ran a honkytonk bar in 1975. Robertson assaulted a bar owner and his wife after an argument.

=== Duck Commander ===
As an avid duck hunter, Robertson was dissatisfied with the condition of duck calls. He began to experiment with making a call that would produce the exact sound of a duck. He invented his first Duck Commander call in 1972. He received a patent for this call and the Duck Commander Company was incorporated in 1973. Today, the company of Duck Commander is a multimillion-dollar business, headed by his son, Willie Robertson. Robertson and his family were portrayed on the A&E reality television series Duck Dynasty, which ran from 2012 to 2017, and covered their daily lives within Duck Commander.

=== Other media ===
Robertson was featured in Steve Bannon's film Torchbearer, in which he talks about the absurdity of life without God, using events like The Holocaust to illustrate the point. In October 2017, Robertson joined CRTV as a contributor, hosting In the Woods with Phil. In September 2023, The Blind: The True Story of the Robertson Family was released in theaters nationwide. The film details the tumultuous early life of Robertson, his wife, and their family until 1985, before their Duck Dynasty fame.

== Controversies ==
=== GQ comments ===
On December 18, 2013, A&E announced the indefinite suspension of Robertson from the network after an interview with Drew Magary of GQ. When during the interview for a featured article in GQ's January 2014 issue entitled "What the Duck?" Robertson was asked what he thought was sinful and responded, "Start with homosexual behavior and just morph out from there. Bestiality, sleeping around with this woman and that woman and that woman and those men." He paraphrased a Biblical passage from First Corinthians by saying "Don't be deceived. Neither the adulterers, the idolaters, the male prostitutes, the homosexual offenders, the greedy, the drunkards, the slanderers, the swindlers—they won't inherit the kingdom of God. Don't deceive yourself. It's not right." Robertson also questioned the appeal of same-sex relationships saying that a vagina is more appealing to a man. Robertson said that he does not judge anyone, but leaves that up to God saying, "We just love 'em, give 'em the good news about Jesus—whether they're homosexuals, drunks, terrorists. We let God sort 'em out later, you see what I'm saying?"

In response to initial criticisms A&E released a statement from Robertson saying, "I would never treat anyone with disrespect just because they are different from me". Later that day the network announced his suspension. After a strong backlash from supporters, including a Facebook page that accumulated 1.5 million likes and statements from political figures condemning the move, A&E lifted the suspension before the show was affected, no episodes were impacted.

=== CPAC comments ===
In 2015, Robertson made further controversial comments when he was awarded the 2015 Breitbart Defender of the First Amendment Award. In a half-hour speech to CPAC, Robertson asserted that STDs are the legacy of Nazis, communists, beatniks, and hippies. He told a long and graphic anecdote about an atheist in his family being murdered, and then the assailants said, "But you're the one who says there is no God, there's no right, there's no wrong, so we're just having fun." His statements went viral.

== Personal life ==
Robertson and Marsha "Miss Kay" Carroway began dating in 1964 as "high school sweethearts." The couple were married in 1966. Despite early troubles in their marriage due to Robertson's "sex, drugs and rock 'n' roll lifestyle," a 2013 editorial published by Yahoo! TV correspondent Kelly Woo described the Robertsons' union as a "long-standing, rock-solid marriage." Their first son, Alan, was born while they were attending college.

Robertson was a devout Christian, a member of and elder at the White's Ferry Road Church of Christ in West Monroe, and was outspoken about his beliefs. He had various personal problems in his 20s including excessive alcohol drinking, causing a separation in the marriage for a period and he credited a subsequent religious awakening for his having been able to overcome the problems. Robertson opposed abortion and called it a violation of the Declaration of Independence. He frequently spoke about the issue during public appearances. In 2013, alongside joint author Mark Schlabach, Robertson published a memoir titled Happy, Happy, Happy.

In a 2013 special House of Representatives election, Robertson made a television commercial endorsing Vance McAllister, a Republican candidate for the Robertson family's home district, Louisiana's 5th congressional district. McAllister, who had never held political office, defeated the thought-to-be frontrunner, state senator Neil Riser. Many attributed the strength of McAllister's come-from-behind victory to the Robertson endorsement. In 2016, Phil Robertson endorsed Ted Cruz for president. As Cruz dropped out of the race, Robertson, while in Cannes, France, endorsed Donald Trump for president. In 2017 Alabama US Senate special election, he endorsed Roy Moore.

In either December 2016 or January 2017, after Ben Carson stepped down from being chairman of American Legacy Center's "Fight for the Court" project, Robertson filled the vacancy. On May 28, 2020, it was revealed that Robertson had learned he had a daughter named Phyllis from an affair in the 1970s.

=== Health and death ===
In 2020, Robertson experienced mobility issues sustaining from a back injury while attempting to load heavy equipment, resulting in a fractured vertebrae which required ongoing management. On December 6, 2024, it was announced that he was diagnosed with Alzheimer's disease. In addition, at the time of his diagnosis, he was also diagnosed with sepsis. By April 5, 2025, the disease progressed rapidly, with the family revealing at the time that Robertson was suffering from severe appetite loss, minimal speech, and a overall decline which limited his daily functioning, though he remained engaged in family discussions as possible.

Robertson died of Alzheimer's disease and sepsis on May 25, 2025, at his home in West Monroe, Louisiana at the age of 79. His daughter-in-law said that a private service and a public celebration of life would be held. The private family service, in which all of Phil's children spoke eulogies, was recorded and the video was released to the public via YouTube on June 7, 2025.
