= Si Robertson =

American television personality (born 1948)

Uncle Si (Silas Robertson)
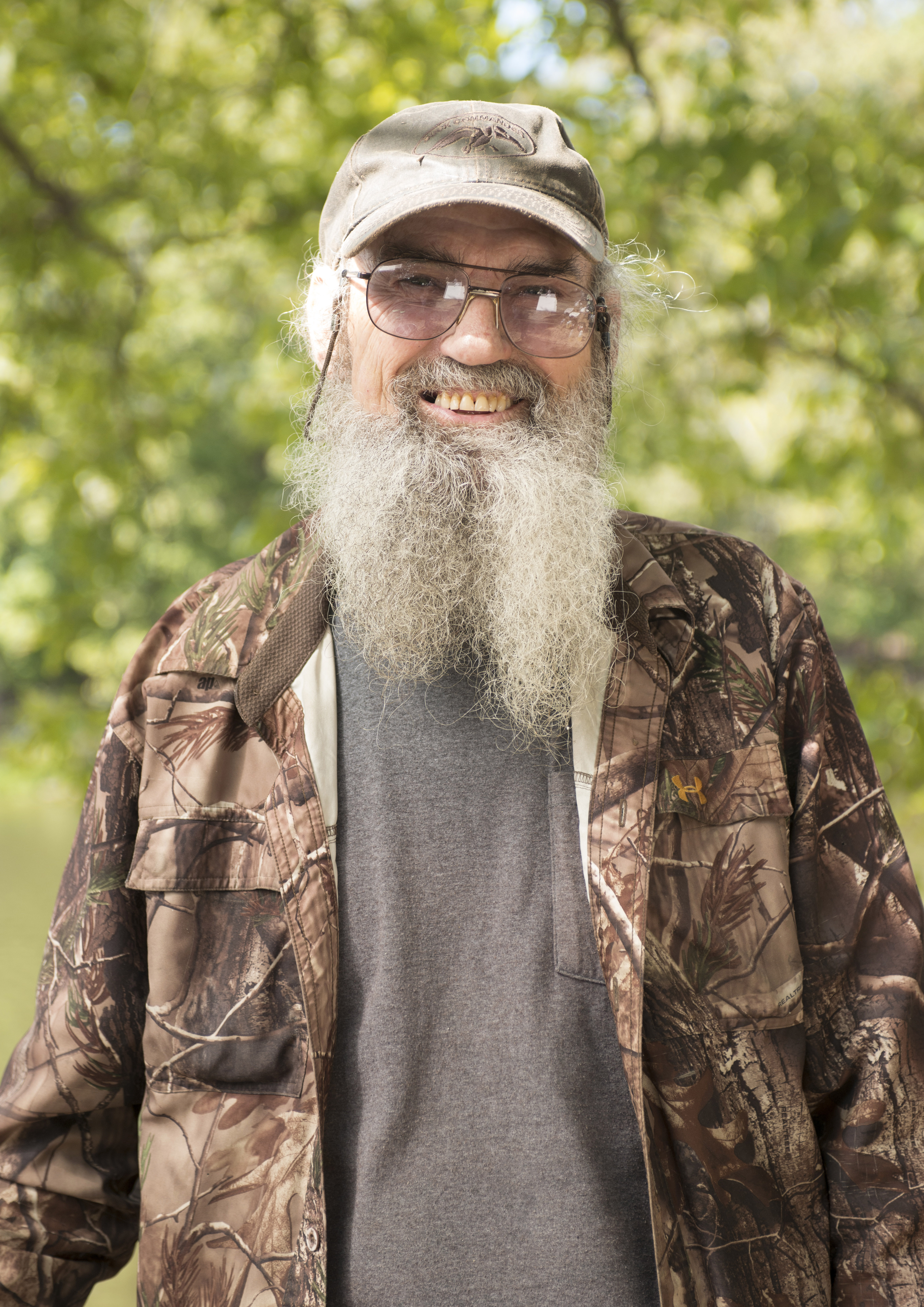
- Si Robertson in 2013
- Born: Silas Merritt Robertson; April 27, 1948 (age 78)
- Occupation: TV show personality
- Television: Duck Dynasty; Going Si-Ral; Duck Call Room; Duck Family Treasure
- Spouse: Christine Raney (m. 1971)
- Children: 2
- Relatives: Phil Alexander Robertson (brother); Jase Robertson (nephew); Willie Robertson (nephew); Sadie Robertson (niece)
- Military career
- Allegiance: United States
- Branch: United States Army
- Service years: 1968–1993
- Rank: Sergeant First Class
- Conflicts: Vietnam War

Silas Merritt Robertson (born April 27, 1948), often referred to as "Uncle Si", is an American television personality, veteran, and a retired reed maker for duck calls at Duck Commander. He is best known for his role on A&E's Duck Dynasty, on which he had emerged as a breakout cast member.

He had also appeared on shows such as the Outdoor Channel's Buck Commander and The Duckmen of Louisiana, and was the eponymous host of the Duck Dynasty spin-off Going Si-Ral. Si has also made a guest appearance on Last Man Standing, and in Big Idea Entertainment's Veggie Tales episode Merry Larry and the True Light of Christmas as Silas the Narrator. He is currently cohosting the podcast Duck Call Room.

== Early life ==
Robertson was born to James and Merritt (née Hale) Robertson, the sixth of seven children. He has four brothers, Jimmy Frank, Harold, Tommy, and Phil (who was born 2 years before him), and two sisters, Judy and Jan. Because of financial setbacks of their family during Si and his siblings' childhoods, the Robertson family lived in rugged conditions with significantly fewer amenities than the average American enjoyed. In high school, Si attended North Caddo High School in Vivian, Louisiana which is in Caddo Parish, Louisiana. He played on the football team in the footsteps of his brother Phil, even wearing the same #10 jersey.

=== Military career ===
After dropping out of Louisiana Tech University in Ruston, Louisiana after three quarters, he was drafted into the United States Army during the Vietnam War. During the war, his mother sent him a set of Tupperware cups, beans and rice, two boots, and two jars of jalapeño peppers in each boot. He is rarely seen without one of his plastic cups drinking iced tea, which he treats with equal importance.

Si retired from the Army in 1993 with the rank of Sergeant First Class (E-7). Robertson is recognized for his military career with an exhibit at the Chennault Aviation and Military Museum in Monroe, Louisiana.

== Career ==
=== Business with Duck Commander ===
Upon retirement from the Army in 1993, Si found employment at his brother Phil's Duck Commander business. Si has been a big part of the growing business. Before retiring from Duck Commander in 2017, Si's job was to fashion the reeds that are inserted in every patented duck call. Si thought that it is an easy job and was depicted in Duck Dynasty as having difficulties staying on task; he often sought breaks to take a nap or play around with equipment in the warehouse.

=== Duck Dynasty ===
In A&E's reality television show Duck Dynasty, Si (or Uncle Si) is one of the main characters. He is perhaps the most well-known and recognized character of the bunch, due to the frequency and quality of his jokes and stories, as well as his general manner. His spontaneous nature often launches the plot of the show into action, whether handcuffing himself to his nephew Willie or spending the prize money of $2,000 at a children's arcade.

Robertson also starred in Going Si-Ral, a spinoff which ran from November 16, 2016, to January 18, 2017, on A&E. He and "Si-kick" Willie study the Internet, especially viral videos.

=== Other appearances ===
In 2013, Robertson lent his voice and personal appearance to the VeggieTales video Merry Larry and the True Light of Christmas, in which he narrates the video and appears as a mall janitor, in the tradition of the mid 1960s and early 1970s Rankin/Bass Christmas specials and their use of celebrity narrators.

In 2015, Robertson along with his nephew and Duck Dynasty co-star Willie appeared on an episode of Last Man Standing. That same year, he appeared as a gas station clerk in the Christian drama film Faith of Our Fathers.

== Personal life ==
In an interview with Good Morning America, Robertson described his wife, "One woman has already got my heart, we've been married for 43 years [at that time] and her name is Miss Christine Robertson". He discussed how after he had asked for her hand in marriage about 70 times, she finally accepted his proposal. The two married in 1971. They both have a daughter, Trasa, and a son, Scott. They also have eight grandsons.

Like the rest of his family, Robertson is very open about his Christian faith. "That's what got me through 65 years of life, my belief in God and what He's done for us and what He will do for us". His favorite Scripture verses are John 3:16 and 17. "When I sign people's stuff I put down John 3:16 and 17. Most people can tell you what 16 says, OK. 'For God so loved the world that He gave His only begotten son.' But they don't know nothin' about 17. It says Jesus didn't come to condemn us. If anybody had a right to condemn someone, it would be the son of God. If he didn't do it, then hey, we definitely are not qualified to do it."

Robertson's son Scott served in the U.S. Army and completed eight tours in Iraq, after which he was diagnosed with post-traumatic stress disorder, motivating Robertson to advocate for better care for veterans.

=== Health ===
In September 2022, Robertson underwent lung surgery as a result of severe respiratory complications stemming from prior smoking and COPD.

In January 2025, Robertson suffered a physical injury during a hunting trip, where he fell when exiting a boat, which required three days of hospitalization. Later that year in October 2025, he was hospitalized for a sinus infection as a result of his respiratory health in which he made a full recovery.

== Discography ==
Title	Details
Me and My Smokin' Hot Honey	Release date: May 13, 2014; Label: Elf Entertainment; Formats: EP, music download

== Works ==
- Si-cology 1: Tales and Wisdom from Duck Dynasty's Favorite Uncle. (2013) Simon & Schuster. ISBN 9781476745398
