= Duck Dynasty =

American reality television series (2012–2017)

- The Robertsons, from left to right: Kay, Phil, Willie, Si, Jase, and Korie
- Genre: Reality television Christian media
- Developed by: A&E Networks
- Starring: Willie Robertson; Phil Robertson; Jase Robertson; Si Robertson; Kay Robertson; Korie Robertson; Jep Robertson
- Narrated by: Willie Robertson
- Opening theme: "Sharp Dressed Man" by ZZ Top
- Composers: Tony Pasko (2012–2017); Aaron Kaplan (2015–2017); John Carta (2012–2014); Eric Allaman (2012–2015); Jonathan Krimstock (2012–2014); Eric Hester (2012–2016); Michael Lord (2012–2014)
- Country of origin: United States
- Original language: English
- No. of seasons: 11
- No. of episodes: 131 (list of episodes)

Production
- Executive producers: Deirdre Gurney; Scott Gurney; Elaine Frontain Bryant; Lily Neumeyer; Laurie Sharpe
- Production locations: Monroe and West Monroe, Louisiana
- Running time: 22–30 minutes
- Production company: Gurney Productions

Original release
- Network: A&E
- Release: March 21, 2012 – April 5, 2017

Related
- Duck Commander series Duck Family Treasure; Duck Dynasty: The Revival; Jep & Jessica: Growing the Dynasty; At Home with the Robertsons; Going Si-ral

Duck Dynasty is an American reality television series that aired on A&E from 2012 to 2017. The series portrays the lives of the Robertson family, who became successful from their family-operated business, Duck Commander. The West Monroe, Louisiana business makes products for duck hunters, primarily a duck call named Duck Commander. The episodes are structured in a sitcom story format, unlike other reality television series, which has allowed it to have continued success in syndication. The bearded Robertsons – brothers Phil and Si, and Phil's sons Jase, Willie, and Jep – are the poster characters for the show, though the main cast consists of family and friends of the Robertsons such as their wives – Miss Kay, Korie, Missy Robertson, and Jessica Robertson – as well as coworkers Martin and Godwin, beardless brother Alan, radio host Mountain Man, and the Robertson children – Sadie, John Luke, Bella, Willie Jr, Rebecca, Rowdy, Mia, Reed, and others. The family was previously featured on the Duckmen series, and Outdoor Channel's Benelli Presents Duck Commander and its Buck Commander spin-off.

The 2013 fourth-season premiere "Till Duck Do Us Part" drew 11.8 million viewers; the most-watched nonfiction cable series in history (at that time), and with a 5.0 rating it is the highest rated telecast for A&E. The show earned $80 million in advertising sales for the first nine months of 2013, and merchandise has generated another $400 million in revenue. After 11 seasons, the series concluded on March 29, 2017, with the hour-long finale "End of an Era", the episode concluded with Si Robertson performing the show's theme song "Sharp Dressed Man" alongside ZZ Top.

In 2025, A&E announced a reboot of the series, titled Duck Dynasty: The Revival, which premiered in the summer of 2025. The reboot series features 20 one-hour episodes that follow Willie and Korie Robertson with their growing family of children and grandchildren at their Louisiana homestead. Initially, Phil Robertson was not expected to be featured in the revival series amid declining health and a recent Alzheimer's disease diagnosis. Phil Robertson died on May 25, 2025.

== Members ==
Name	Family Member	Seasons										
Name	Family Member	1	2	3	4	5	6	7	8	9	10	11
Phil Robertson	Willie's father, President of Duck Commander	Main				Recurring						
Kay Robertson	Willie's mother	Main										
Alan Robertson	Willie's brother				Recurring							
Lisa Robertson	Alan's wife				Recurring							
Jase Robertson	Willie's brother, COO of Duck Commander	Main										
Missy Robertson	Jase's wife	Main										
Reed Robertson	Jase's son	Recurring										
Brighton Robertson	Reed's wife										Recurring	
Cole Robertson	Jase's son		Recurring									
Mia Robertson	Jase's daughter		Recurring									
Willie Robertson	CEO, Duck Commander	Main										
Korie Robertson	Willie's wife	Main										
John Luke Robertson	Willie's son	Main										
Mary Kate McEacharn-Robertson	John Luke's wife								Recurring			
Sadie Robertson	Willie's daughter	Main										
Bella Robertson	Willie's daughter	Recurring										
Rebecca Robertson	Willie's daughter				Recurring							
Willie Robertson Jr.	Willie's son	Recurring										
Rowdy Robertson	Willie's son										Recurring	
Jep Robertson	Willie's brother	Main										
Jessica Robertson	Jep's wife	Main										
Lily Robertson	Jep's daughter	Recurring										
Merritt Robertson	Jep's daughter	Recurring										
Priscilla Robertson	Jep's daughter	Recurring										
River Robertson	Jep's son				Recurring							
Jules Augustus "Gus" Robertson	Jep's son											Recurring
Si Robertson	Willie's uncle/Vietnam Veteran	Main										
Christine Robertson	Si's Wife											Guest
John Godwin	Employee	Main										
Justin Martin	Employee	Main										

== Robertson family participants ==
=== Phil Alexander Robertson ===
Phil, (1946–2025), was the family patriarch and creator of the Duck Commander duck call. He was a standout quarterback at Louisiana Tech (actually starting ahead of future Hall of Famer Terry Bradshaw) and was contacted by the Washington Redskins after his junior year. He chose instead to quit football because it interfered with duck hunting season.

Phil graduated from Louisiana Tech with a Bachelor of Arts degree in Physical Education and later received a Masters of Arts degree in Education via night classes while working as a schoolteacher. Phil went through a "dark period" while running a bar that led to his separation from his wife. It was at this low point he reports that he found Christ and reconciled with his wife. It was then that he invented his duck call, and founded the Duck Commander Company in 1973.

Phil was known for his dislike of modern technology, calling himself "a low-tech man in a high-tech world," and his concern that his grandchildren are becoming "yuppies". At the end of each episode, the family is shown at the dining table, usually with Phil praying over the meal.

=== Marsha Kay "Miss Kay" Robertson ===
Kay Robertson (née Carroway), born December 21, 1947 (age 78), married Phil on January 11, 1966. They were together for 59 years, until Phil's death in May 2025. She is usually addressed as "Miss Kay" by her husband and sons. Kay married Phil at age 16. She is the mother of Alan, Jase, Willie, and Jep.

Phil and Kay's children

#	Name	Date of birth	Notes	Ref(s)
1	Marshal Alan Robertson	January 5, 1965 (age 61)	Married to Lisa Gibson; the couple have two daughters	
2	Jason Silas "Jase" Robertson	August 16, 1969 (age 56)	Married to Melissa Louise "Missy" West; the couple have three children	
3	Willie Jess Robertson	April 22, 1972 (age 54)	Married to Leslie Koren "Korie" Howard; the couple have six children	
4	Jules Jeptha "Jep" Robertson	May 28, 1978 (age 48)	Married to Jessica Pamela Strickland; the couple have five children	

==== Marshal Alan Robertson ====
Alan is Phil and Kay's eldest son. He left the family business to become a preacher, but rejoined the family both doing public relations at Duck Commander and appearing on the show since Season 4. He wanted to join the show to spread the Word of God to more people. Alan married Lisa Robertson (née Gibson) on November 9, 1984, and is the only adult male in the family without a beard.

Alan and Lisa's children

#	Name	Date of birth	Notes	Ref(s)
1	Elizabeth Anna Robertson	February 28, 1986 (age 40)	Married to Jay Stone; they have three daughters	
2	Katie Alexis Robertson	November 30, 1987 (age 38)	Married to Vinny Mancuso; they have two sons and one daughter	

==== Jason Silas "Jase" Robertson ====
Jase is Phil and Miss Kay's second son. He is in charge of the manufacturing aspects at Duck Commander. Along with other employees, Jase tunes the duck calls by hand. He and his wife Missy have three children.

===== Reed Robertson =====
Reed, the oldest child and first son of Jase and Missy, attended Ouachita Christian High School, playing football and baseball. His graduation is shown in Season 6. He is currently attending Harding University, and is married to Brighton Thompson; their wedding is shown in Season 11. He started a music career in Nashville. In June 2021, it was announced that he and Brighton are expecting a baby girl. As of 2025, the couple have 3 children.

===== Cole Robertson =====
Cole, the second son of Jase and Missy, attended Ouachita Christian High School and played baseball. His graduation is shown in Season 10.

===== Mia Robertson =====
Mia is the youngest child and only daughter of Jase and Missy. She was born with a cleft lip and palate and, as of the end of Season 9, has had 15 surgeries to correct it.

==== Willie Jess Robertson ====
Willie is Phil and Miss Kay's third son and CEO of Duck Commander. Willie has a bachelor's degree in Health and Human Performance from NE Louisiana University, with an emphasis on Business. He took Duck Commander from a family business to a multimillion-dollar empire. He and his wife Korie have six children.

===== John Luke Robertson =====
John Luke, the son of Willie and Korie, is the second-oldest child of the family after Rebecca. He attended Ouachita Christian High School and later Liberty University. Since summer 2019, John Luke has been the director of Camp Ch-Yo-Ca, a Christian summer camp in Calhoun, Louisiana. In October 2019, he and his wife Mary-Kate welcomed a son, John Shepherd. In April 2021, they announced the birth of their daughter, Ella.

===== Mary Kate Robertson =====
Mary Kate is John Luke's wife. Mary Kate and John Luke were married on June 28, 2015. She also attended Liberty University and studied Women's Leadership.

===== Sadie Robertson =====
Sadie, the daughter of Willie and Korie, attended Ouachita Christian High School. Her graduation is shown in Season 10. Sadie now is an influential speaker and author. She has been married to Christian Huff since November 25, 2019. In 2020, it was announced she was expecting her first child, a girl. On May 11, 2021, she and her husband welcomed a daughter named Honey James Huff. On May 22, 2023, they welcomed second daughter named Haven.

===== Bella Robertson =====
Youngest daughter of Willie and Korie. In November 2020, at age 18, she became engaged to her boyfriend of 6 months, Jacob Mayo; they married on June 5, 2021.

===== Rebecca Robertson =====
Rebecca is the foster daughter of Willie and Korie. The family originally hosted Rebecca when she was an exchange student from Taiwan and consider her one of the family. After completing a two-year fashion internship in Southern California, she returned home to West Monroe and opened a clothing boutique. She married John Reed Loflin in Mexico on December 3, 2016. Rebecca and John Reed have a son born on January 11, 2019. They welcomed a daughter on December 24, 2021

===== Willie Robertson Jr. =====
Adopted son of Willie and Korie. The family's first adopted son, "Little Will" joined the Robertsons when he was just five weeks old. Will wasn't a regular on Duck Dynasty, only making occasional appearances on the show, as he's not as involved in the family business as some of his siblings are.

===== Rowdy Robertson =====
Adopted son of Willie and Korie. His adoption is shown being finalized in Season 11.

==== Jules Jeptha "Jep" Robertson ====
Jep is Phil and Miss Kay's youngest son who films and edits DVDs of the Robertson family's duck hunts. He is often seen at Duck Commander and at family dinners. Jep and Jessica have five children. In 2015 the couple wrote a book called The Good, the Bad, and the Grace of God: What Honesty and Pain Taught Us About Faith, Family, and Forgiveness with Susy Flory, with the book hitting the New York Times bestseller list. Jep and Jessica introduced the newest addition to their family, an adopted son they named Jules Augustus (nicknamed "Gus"), on the premiere of their spin-off series Jep and Jessica: Growing the Dynasty on January 20, 2016, which had an audience of more than two million. The second season premiered on February 22, 2017.

=== Silas Merritt "Si" Robertson ===
Si, born April 27, 1948 (age 78), is Phil's brother, a Vietnam War veteran, and uncle to Phil and Miss Kay's four sons. Si worked at Duck Commander making the reeds that go into every duck call.

Si also appears in the show's second spin-off Going Si-Ral alongside Willie Robertson where Si studies the Internet.

=== Christine Robertson ===
Christine is Si's wife.

== Other participants ==
=== Recurring ===
- John Godwin – An employee at Duck Commander since 2002, mainly building duck calls, managing supplies, and overseeing the shipping department as well as being the decoy technician.
- Justin Martin – Longtime employee of Duck Commander, mainly building duck calls.
- Mountain Man (Tim Guraedy) – A neighbor who operates his own air-conditioning repair business, and co-hosts a local radio talk show on KXKZ.
- Jimmy Red (Jimmy Gibson) – An old friend of Phil, Miss Kay, and Si; referred to as "Red" by Phil (five episodes; Seasons 1 and 2)
- John David Owen – An assistant of Willie and an cousin of Korie.

=== Non-recurring ===
- Gordon – Phil's brother-in-law; appeared in the season 5 finale episode "Stand by Mia".

=== Guest ===
- Clint Bowyer – Appeared in the season 2 episode "Drag Me to Glory".
- "Hacksaw" Jim Duggan – Appeared in the season 5 finale episode "Stand by Mia".
- Bobby Jindal – Appeared in the season 6 episode "Governor's Travels".
- Ben Rector – Appeared in the season 8 finale episode "John Luke Gets Hitched"
- Alexander Jean – Appeared in the season 8 finale episode "John Luke Gets Hitched"
- Kurt Angle – Appeared in the season 9 episode "Van He'llsing".
- Colt Ford – Appeared in the season 9 finale episode "RV There Yet?"
- Reza Borchardt – Appeared in the season 11 episode "Disappearing Acts"
- ZZ Top – Appeared in the series finale "End of an Era".

== Episodes ==
Season	Episodes	Originally released	
Season	Episodes	First released	Last released
1	15	March 21, 2012	May 23, 2012
2	13	October 10, 2012	December 5, 2012
3	13	February 27, 2013	April 24, 2013
4	11	August 14, 2013	December 11, 2013
5	10	January 15, 2014	March 26, 2014
6	9	June 11, 2014	August 13, 2014
7	10	November 19, 2014	February 11, 2015
8	9	June 24, 2015	August 19, 2015
9	11	January 13, 2016	March 2, 2016
10	14	July 6, 2016	August 24, 2016
11	15	November 16, 2016	March 29, 2017

== Ratings ==
An hour-long Christmas special premiered on December 5, 2012, as the Season 2 finale and became (at the time) the most-watched A&E episode in the network's history.

On February 27, 2013, the Season 3 premiere tallied 8.9 million viewers, including five million in the adults 25–54 demographic and five million in adults 18–49 demographic, making the premiere (at the time) the most watched series in network history, beating the Season 2 finale. The one-hour Season 3 finale (shown on April 24, 2013) tallied 9.6 million viewers, with 5.6 million in the Adults 25–54 demographic and 5.5 million in the Adults 18–49 demographic, making it the highest rated telecast in A&E history.

On August 14, 2013, the Season 4 premiere drew a total of 11.8 million viewers, an increase of 37% vs. the season three premiere, drawing 6.3 million viewers in the Adults 25–54 demographic, making it the most watched nonfiction series telecast in cable television history. According to The Hollywood Reporter, the fourth season averaged 9.4 million viewers.

Duck Dynasty topped the list of celebrity/pop culture-themed costume searches on Yahoo! in October 2013, according to data compiled by Yahoo Web trend expert Carolyn Clark. As of October 17, 2014, the show has averaged 8.3 million viewers for 2014. According to an October 2014 release from E! Online, the majority of the series's Facebook audience is Republican. In 2016, The New York Times reported that Duck Dynasty "is the prototypical example of a show that is most popular in rural areas. The correlation between fandom and the percentage of people who voted for businessman Donald Trump as higher ... than it was for any other" of the 50 shows with the most Facebook Likes. It was most popular in rural Texas, Arkansas, and Louisiana, and least popular in the Northeast US. The show and its franchise also has a cult following in the Philippines.

=== Seasonal ratings ===
Season	Time slot (ET)	# Ep.	Premiere			Finale			Season average	TV season
Season	Time slot (ET)	# Ep.	Date	Premiere viewers (in millions)	18–49 rating	Date	Finale viewers (in millions)	18–49 rating	Season average	TV season
1	Wednesday 10:00 pm Wednesday 10:30 pm	15	March 21, 2012	1.81	0.8	May 23, 2012	2.56	1.2	1.82	2012
2	Wednesday 10:00 pm Wednesday 10:30 pm	13	October 10, 2012	3.70	1.7	December 5, 2012	6.45	3.0	4.17	2012
3	Wednesday 10:00 pm Wednesday 10:30 pm	13	February 27, 2013	8.62	3.9	April 24, 2013	9.63	4.3	8.32	2013
4	Wednesday 10:00 pm	10	August 14, 2013	11.77	5.0	October 23, 2013	8.40	3.5	9.16	2013
5	Wednesday 10:00 pm Wednesday 10:30 pm	10	January 15, 2014	8.49	3.4	March 26, 2014	6.00	2.5	6.51	2014
6	Wednesday 10:00 pm	10	June 11, 2014	4.59	1.8	August 13, 2014	3.81	1.4	3.77	2014
7	Wednesday 9:00 pm Wednesday 9:30 pm	10	November 19, 2014	2.62	1.0	February 11, 2015	2.51	0.9		2014–15
8	Wednesday 9:30 pm	9	June 24, 2015	2.51	0.9	August 19, 2015	3.26	1.0		2015
9	Wednesday 9:00 pm	11	January 13, 2016	2.07	0.7	March 2, 2016	1.74	0.6		2016
10	Wednesday 9:00 pm	14	July 6, 2016	1.30	0.5	August 24, 2016	1.24	0.43		2016
11	Wednesday 9:00 pm	15	November 16, 2016	1.29	0.48	March 29, 2017	1.51	0.50		2016–17

== Controversy ==
Phil Robertson stated on Sports Spectrum, a Christian sports publication, that he confronted producers about editors of the show telling them not to say Jesus's name while praying at the end of episodes, and that they added intermittent bleep censors over random portions of the cast's unscripted dialogue although there was no profanity being spoken. Robertson cited the issues as part of what is often called "spiritual warfare", that there was no swearing that needed to be edited out, and the prayers were being censored to avoid offending non-Christian religious people. A&E did not comment on the claims.

A&E suspended Phil Robertson over remarks he made during an interview with Drew Magary for GQ Magazine which had attracted outside criticism. During the interview for a featured article in GQ's January 2014 issue, titled "What the Duck?", Magary asked Robertson: "What, in your mind, is sinful?" Robertson replied: "Start with homosexual behavior and just morph out from there. Bestiality, sleeping around with this woman and that woman and that woman and those men." A&E stated they were "extremely disappointed to have read Phil Robertson's comments in GQ, which are based on his own personal beliefs and are not reflected in the series Duck Dynasty". He said he is a "product of the '60s" but has since lived his life on Biblical principles. He added: "I would never treat anyone with disrespect just because they are different from me." The Robertson family released a statement about A&E's decision, refusing to do the show without him and supporting Phil by saying that while some of his comments were "coarse," his beliefs are "grounded in the teachings of the Bible." In the first public interview since the GQ interview, Robertson stood by his words and said: "Jesus will take sins away. If you're a homosexual, He'll take it away. If you're an adulterer, if you're a liar, what's the difference?;" Robertson himself would later be revealed to have had an adulterous affair in the 1970s which resulted in him conceiving a daughter.

Robertson's remarks were reported in the media, with reactions split. Many social conservatives, including his corporate sponsors, some religious groups, and some Republican politicians including Sarah Palin, Bobby Jindal and Mike Huckabee, supported his right to such opinions. Robertson faced significant opposition from individuals viewing his comments as anti-gay and bigoted. A&E reversed Robertson's suspension. The network cited Phil and the family's regret for the use of "coarse language" in discussing body parts, and stated that A&E would launch a public service announcement across the channel's "entire portfolio" that would promote "tolerance and acceptance among all people." A Human Rights Campaign representative saw the reinstatement and message as a positive step, and "the real harm that such anti-gay and racist comments can cause" and the governor of Louisiana Bobby Jindal remarked on "tolerance of religious views".

== Media franchise ==
The success of Duck Dynasty caused numerous spin-offs and expanded the media franchise for Duck Commander. This includes other television series, a music album, books, podcasts, and video games.

=== Revival series ===
In January 2025, A&E announced it had ordered two ten-episode seasons of a new series called Duck Dynasty: The Revival, a reboot which will focus on Willie and Korie Robertson and their adult children and grandchildren. Other family members who featured prominently on the original series will return, except for Phil Robertson, who the family announced in 2024 had been diagnosed with Alzheimer's disease and other health issues.

=== Spin-offs and other productions ===
Duck Dynasty has launched several spin-off series since its release, including Jep & Jessica: Growing the Dynasty and Going Si-Ral during the show's success on A&E. Following the show's conclusion, Blaze Media produced the 2017–2021 show In the Woods with Phil, and starting in 2022 Fox Entertainment created a streaming and broadcast syndication series called Duck Family Treasure. Like past shows, many Robertson family members, co-workers, and friends appear in these spin-offs. Various on-going podcasts continue to prominently feature the Robertsons as well: Phil, Jase, and Alan host Unashamed; Sadie hosts WHOA That's Good Podcast; and Duck Commander produces Duck Call Room with Si, Martin, and Godwin. Outdoor Channel acquired rerun rights to Duck Dynasty in 2016. In 2020 Fox Nation acquired the streaming rights to the show for the year; after that deal concluded, Hulu began streaming the series in 2023.

== In popular culture ==
Duck Dynasty was parodied on Cartoon Network's MAD in a skit called, "McDuck Dynasty". It was a mash-up of DuckTales and Duck Dynasty that had the cast of DuckTales playing the roles of the Robertsons.

== Awards and nominations ==
Year	Nominee / Work	Award Associations		Result	Ref(s)
Year	Nominee / Work	Award Ceremony / Media	Category	Result	Ref(s)
2013	The Robertsons – Duck Dynasty	Teen Choice Awards	Choice TV: Male Reality Star	Nominated	
2014	Duck Dynasty	Critics' Choice Television Awards	Best Reality Series	Nominated	
2014	Duck Dynasty	Movieguide Awards	Faith & Freedom	Won	
