= Willie Robertson =

American television personality and businessman (born 1972)

Colonel Willie Robertson
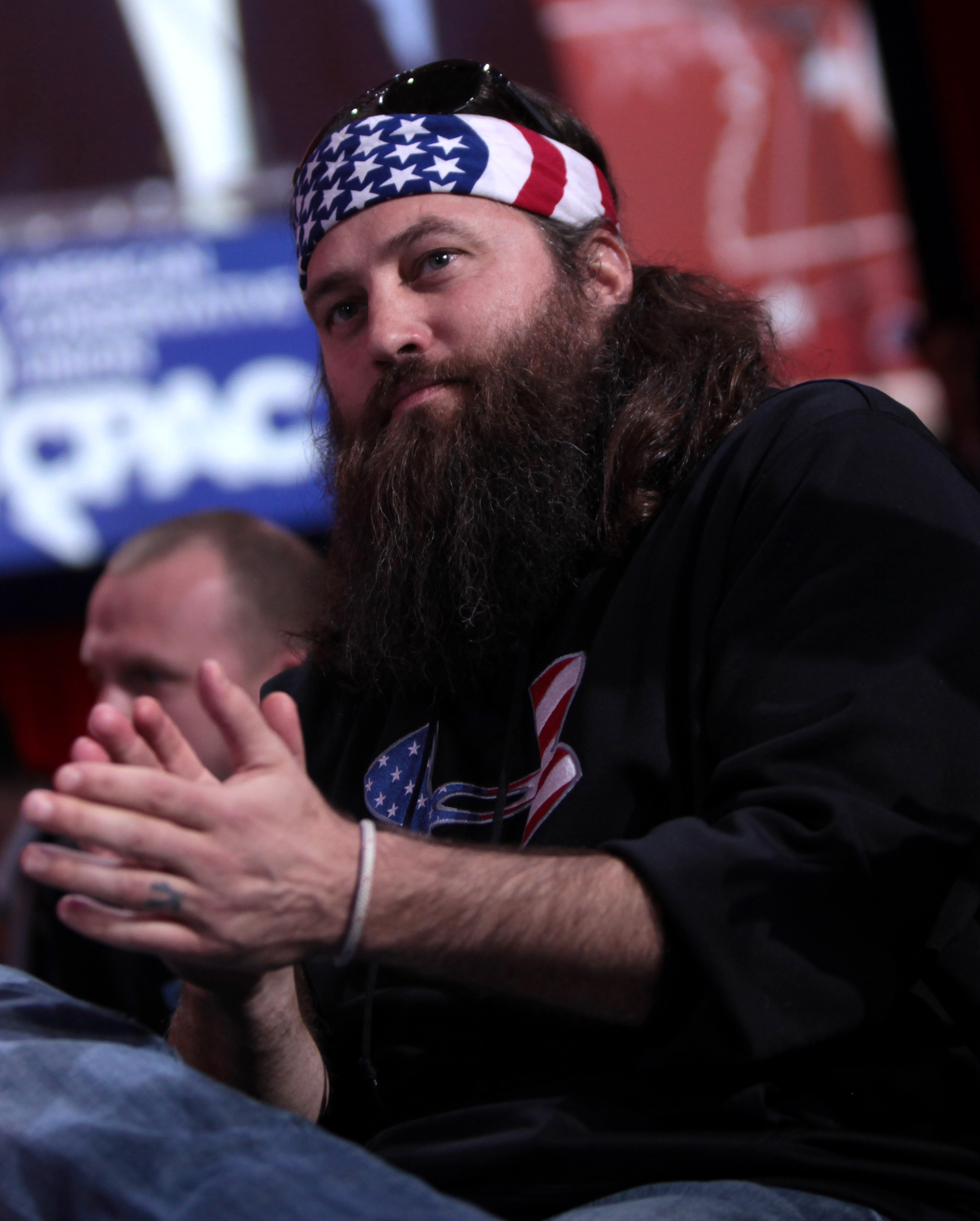
- Robertson in 2015
- Born: April 22, 1972 (age 54); Bernice, Louisiana, U.S.
- Other name: "Boss Hog”
- Education: Harding University; Northeast Louisiana University
- Occupations: CEO of Duck Commander & buck commander, businessman, television personality, news contributor.
- Years active: 2002–present
- Television: Duck Dynasty
- Spouse: Korie Howard (m. 1992)
- Children: 6, including Sadie Robertson Huff
- Parent(s): Phil Robertson; Kay Robertson
- Relatives: Jason Robertson (brother); Silas Robertson (uncle)

William Jess Robertson (born April 22, 1972) is an American TV personality, businessman, author and news contributor. He is best known for his appearances on the reality TV series Duck Dynasty on A&E, and is the current CEO of the company Duck Commander. Robertson lives in West Monroe, Louisiana, with his wife Korie and his children: John Luke, Sadie, Will, Rowdy, Bella, and Rebecca.

== Childhood ==
Robertson was born at Tri-Ward General Hospital in Bernice, Louisiana, in Union Parish, to Phil and Marsha Kay Robertson. He was born 2 days before his father's 26th birthday. He has two older brothers, Alan and Jase, one younger sister, Phyllis, and one younger brother, Jep. Willie grew up around hunting and the outdoors, and spent considerable time around Duck Commander, a small business run by his father. Willie handled various tasks at the company, including building duck calls and handling business calls.

== Business ==
Willie attended Harding University and graduated from Northeast Louisiana University. In 2014, Harding declared Willie and Korie Howard Robertson jointly as Outstanding Young Alumni. His business degree helped take Duck Commander from a family business to a multimillion-dollar empire. Duck Commander is the company that generated a great portion of the wealth that he has acquired and also generated the interest to start the TV show Duck Dynasty.

In 2006, Robertson started another pursuit, the company Buck Commander. This company has also created the Buckmen series of DVDs and the television show Buck Commander Protected by Under Armour on the Outdoor Channel.

Along with Si, he appeared on an episode of Last Man Standing, and made a cameo in the Christian film, God's Not Dead, with his wife. In the movie he is being interviewed by Amy about his show and states that while hunting is his life, the most important thing in his life is Jesus Christ. He also appears at the end of the film during a Newsboys concert, where he gives a message to the concert audience to text "God's not dead" to everyone, having heard about the events in college when Josh stood up to Radisson for his beliefs. Willie's daughter, Sadie Robertson is featured in its sequel, God's Not Dead 2, as high-school student Marlene.

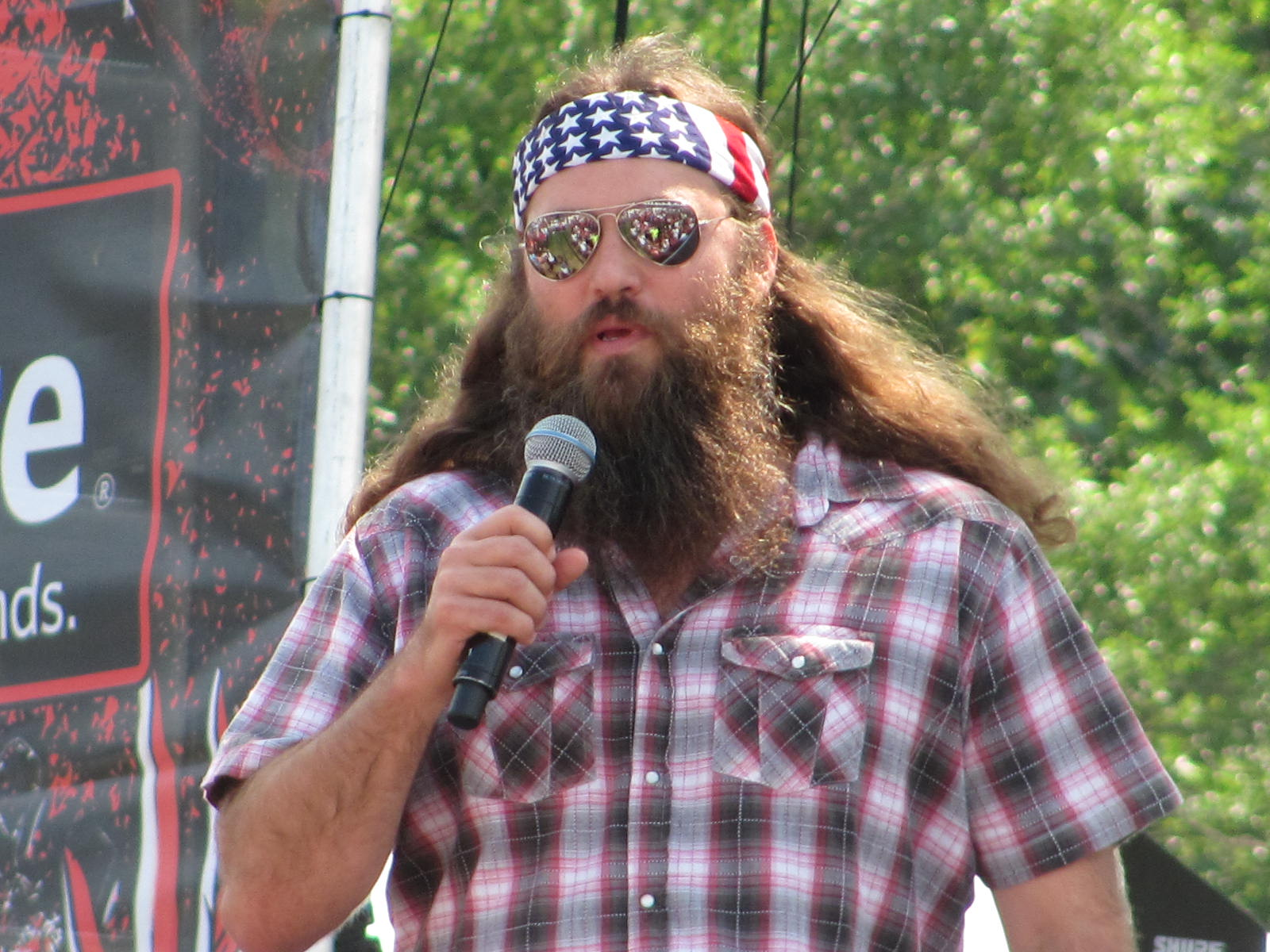
Robertson in 2013

Willie Robertson was the guest of United States Representative Vance McAllister at the 2014 State of the Union Address by President Barack Obama.

In 2021, Robertson competed in season six of The Masked Singer as "Mallard". He was eliminated alongside Bobby Berk as "Caterpillar".

== Personal life ==
Robertson is known for his Christian faith and often preaches about it to others. He is a member of the Churches of Christ. He is also almost always seen wearing a bandana in the pattern of the American flag on his head, and he often wears a white suit jacket to look more professional, though the jacket has drawn comparisons to The Dukes of Hazzard character Boss Hogg (Willie's Twitter handle is "williebosshog").

Robertson, like many of his family members featured on Duck Dynasty, is known for his ZZ Top-style beard.

On April 25, 2020, Robertson's house was shot at in a drive-by shooting. While he was shopping at a store, his family were still at home when Daniel King Jr. shot 8 to 10 bullets at the property. He stated that he was "Pretty shook up" when a bullet passed through a window of the home where his son John-Luke and his wife and infant son were living. No one was hurt, and eventually the perpetrator was caught.

== Filmography ==
- Billy the Exterminator (2010)
- Duck Dynasty (2012–2017)
- Last Man Standing (2013)
- God's Not Dead (2014) – Cameo appearance
- Whose Line Is It Anyway? (2015)
- Buck Commander (2010–present)
- Duck Commander (2009–2011)
- The Masked Singer (2021)
- Bad Men Must Bleed (2025)

== Awards ==
Louisiana Governor Bobby Jindal presented Willie Robertson with the inaugural Governor's Award for Entrepreneurial Excellence in March 2014, at the Duck Commander warehouse in West Monroe.

Robertson is a Kentucky Colonel.
