= Korie Robertson =

American reality television personality

Korie Howard Robertson
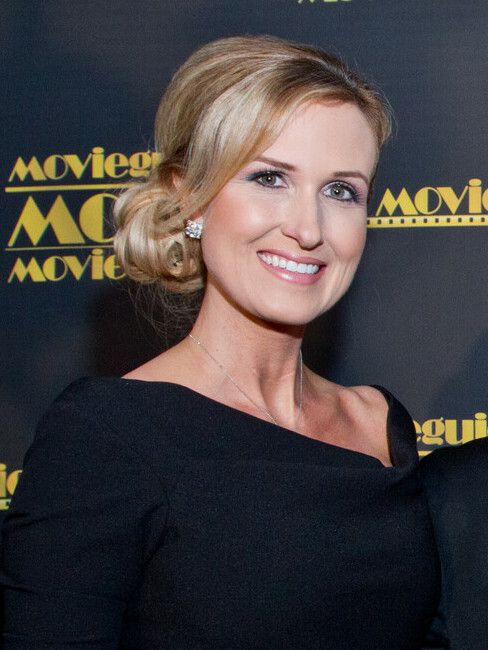
- Robertson in 2015
- Born: Leslie Koren Howard; October 24, 1973 (age 52); Louisiana, U.S.
- Education: Harding University
- Occupation: Office manager of Duck Commander
- Years active: 2012–present
- Television: Duck Dynasty
- Spouse: Willie Robertson (m. 1992)
- Children: 6, including Sadie Robertson
- Relatives: Alton Hardy Howard (grandfather); W. L. "Jack" Howard (great-uncle); V. E. Howard (great-uncle)

Korie Howard Robertson (née Howard; born October 24, 1973) is an American reality television star on the A&E show Duck Dynasty.

== Life and career ==
Robertson is the daughter of John and Chrys Howard, and the daughter-in-law of Phil Robertson, founder of the Duck Commander. Her husband is Willie Robertson. Together, they have six children: John Luke, Sadie, Will, Bella, Rowdy, and Rebecca. As of fall 2024, Robertson has eight grandchildren.

Robertson attended Harding University in Searcy, Arkansas. In 2014, Harding University declared Willie and Korie Howard Robertson jointly as Outstanding Young Alumni.

She sang on her family's album, Duck the Halls: A Robertson Family Christmas, released in 2013.

She is a granddaughter of businessman Alton Hardy Howard and a great-niece of Alton Hardy's brother, W. L. "Jack" Howard, former mayor of Monroe. Alton and Jack Howard were proprietor of the former Howard Brothers Discount Stores. Another great-uncle was the Church of Christ minister V. E. Howard.

In 2023, Korie and her husband, Willie Robertson, produced a film titled, The Blind. The movie is about Phil and Kay Robertson, Willie's parents, and their life. The film focuses on Phil Robertson's struggle with infidelity and alcohol, and how his Christian faith helped him redeem himself. The film made $17 million in the four weeks it was in theaters. In the same year, Korie and her husband produced the musical, His Story, as a way to make the gospel and entertainment come together. The musical was performed in The Colony, Texas at The Broadway Tent at Grandscape.

== Bibliography ==
- Hugs for Dog Lovers (2007) by Korie and Willie Robertson ISBN 9781476738185
- The Duck Commander Family (2013) by Korie and Willie Robertson ISBN 9781476703664
- The Women of Duck Commander (2016) by Kay Robertson, Korie Robertson, Missy Robertson, Jessica Robertson, and Lisa Robertson ISBN 9781476763651
- Strong and Kind: Raising Kids of Character (2017) by Korie Robertson with Willie Robertson and Chrys Howard ISBN 978-0718097110
