= 2020 Army Black Knights football team =

United States Military Academy in the 2020 NCAA Division I FBS football season

2020 Army Black Knights football

Lambert-Meadowlands Trophy

Liberty Bowl, L 21–24 vs. West Virginia
- Conference: Independent
- Record: 9–3
- Head coach: Jeff Monken (7th season)
- Offensive coordinator: Brent Davis (7th season)
- Offensive scheme: Triple option
- Defensive coordinator: Nate Woody (1st season)
- Co-defensive coordinator: Greg Gasparato (1st season)
- Base defense: 3–4 multiple
- Captains: Mike Johnson; Sandon McCoy; Amadeo West
- Home stadium: Michie Stadium

2020 NCAA Division I FBS independents football records
	Conf.			Overall
Team	W		L	W		L
No. 11 BYU		–		11	–	1
No. 17 Liberty		–		10	–	1
Army		–		9	–	3
New Mexico State		–		1	–	1
UMass		–		0	–	4
Note: Due to COVID-19, UConn canceled the 2020 football season; New Mexico State was the only FBS school to play a spring schedule.; Rankings from AP Poll.

The 2020 Army Black Knights football team represented the United States Military Academy as an independent in the 2020 NCAA Division I FBS football season. The Black Knights were led by seventh-year head coach Jeff Monken and played their home games at Michie Stadium in West Point, New York

In a season impacted by the COVID-19 pandemic, the Black Knights compiled a 9–2 regular season record. They defeated the Midshipmen of Navy and the Air Force Falcons to secure Army's ninth Commander-in-Chief's Trophy, their third in four seasons.

On October 24, the Black Knights became the first team of the 2020 season to accept a bowl invitation, to the Independence Bowl. However, that bowl was canceled on December 20, due to a lack of available teams, leaving Army without a bowl game. Athletic director Mike Buddie said that "the team will continue to look for an opponent." On December 21, the Black Knights were named to the Liberty Bowl, after Tennessee had to withdraw due to positive COVID-19 testing within their program. Army went on to lose to West Virginia in the bowl, finishing the season with a 9–3 record.

Following the completion of the season, the Black Knights were awarded the 2020 Lambert Trophy by the Eastern College Athletic Conference (ECAC) and Metropolitan New York Football Writers, signifying them as the best team in the East in Division I FBS. This was the ninth overall time the Lambert Trophy had been awarded to Army, and the second in three years (2018).

== Preseason ==
=== Offseason ===
==== Coaching changes ====
Following the completion of the 2019 season, reports surfaced that a staff shake-up was coming at Army. On December 20, reporter Pete Thamel of Yahoo Sports initially reported that John Loose would be moved out of the defensive coordinator position to assistant head coach and that wide receivers coach Marcus Edwards would not return to the staff. On December 21, former beat reporter Sal Interdonato, now with Black Knight Nation, confirmed Thamel's information and added that defensive line coach Kevin Lewis and outside linebackers coach Matt Hachmann, both of whom joined the Army staff for the 2019 season, would not be returning in 2020.

This was confirmed on January 2, when Nate Woody was announced by head coach Jeff Monken as Army's new defensive coordinator (DC). He had previously spent the 2019 season as a defensive analyst for Michigan, helping the Wolverines to edge out Army in double overtime. Prior to that he was the defensive coordinator under Monken-mentor Paul Johnson at Georgia Tech in 2018, the DC at Appalachian State from 2013 to 2017 during their transition into the FBS, and the DC at Wofford from 2000 to 2012, who were fellow SoCon members with Jeff Monken-coached Georgia Southern. Included in the news of Woody's hire was that former DC John Loose would be elevated to Assistant head coach in addition to serving as a position coach.

On January 8, Troy announced that they had hired away assistant strength and conditioning (S&C) coach Rusty Whitt to be the new head football S&C coach for the Trojans. Whitt had joined the Black Knights' staff for the 2019 season following nine seasons as the head S&C coach at Louisiana and Texas Tech.

On January 10, Keith Gaither was announced as the new wide receivers (WR) coach. He had previously served as the WR coach at Army in 2015 and 2016 before moving on to be the passing game coordinator/WR coach at East Carolina. Gaither spent the 2017 and 2018 seasons at ECU before being let go with the rest of Scottie Montgomery's staff. He spent the 2019 season as the WR coach at Western Michigan.

On January 16, Sal Interdonato and Black Knight Nation reported that inside linebackers coach Kevin Corless, who had been on the Army staff since Monken's first year in 2014, would not be returning for the 2020 season. Additionally, he reported that Greg Gasparato was expected to join the defensive staff. This was confirmed two days later on January 18 when Gasparato was officially announced as the newest Army defensive assistant coach, with his specific position duty to be announced at a later date. Gasparato previously spent the 2018–2019 seasons as the safeties coach for Appalachian State and the 2015–2017 seasons as the inside linebackers coach at Wofford.

On January 20, the West Point Athletic Department announced the retirement of quarterbacks (QB) coach Mitch Ware following a 35-year career, the past six of which were spent with the Black Knights. On the same day, Cody Worley was announced as the new QB coach for Army. Worley came to the Black Knights following six years (five seasons, 2015–2019) as the QB and B-backs coach for Kennesaw State during that program's creation and very rapid success at the FCS-level.

On January 24, two new assistant coaches were announced by head coach Jeff Monken: Shiel Wood as a defensive assistant and Saga Tuitele as the offensive line (OL) coach. Wood joined the staff after spending the 2019 season as the inside linebackers coach and special teams coordinator for Georgia State. Prior to that, he spent the 2018 season with Woody at Georgia Tech as the safeties coach and the previous eight seasons at Wofford in various capacities including a year as DC. Tuitele joined the Black Knights staff after spending the previous four seasons as the OL coach and run game coordinator for New Mexico. Prior to that he spent seven seasons with Cal Poly as the OL coach and offensive coordinator and the 2007 and 2008 seasons as the OL coach at Army.

On January 28, it was announced that offensive analyst Matt Drinkall would be promoted to tight ends (TE) coach, replacing Sean Saturnio who would be shifted back to special teams coordinator to cover for Mike Krysl's leaving to join Arkansas. With these announcements, all of the core assistant coach positions on staff were covered, with the only exception being the specific position group announcements for coaches Gasparato, Loose, and Wood.

On February 11, the team roster was updated to show the position responsibilities for the new defensive hires as well as some responsibility shifts. John Loose, formerly the DC, was put in charge of the outside linebackers (OLB). Greg Gasparato, one of the new hires, was put in charge of the safeties (S). Shiel Wood, another new hire, was put in charge of the inside linebackers (ILB). Finally, Josh Christian-Young, the previous year's safeties coach, was put in charge of the nickelbacks.

On March 19, it was announced that former Army assistant coach and player Mike Sullivan was hired as the new Director of recruiting. He spent a 17-year career as a coach in the NFL, serving as an offensive coordinator (New York Giants '16-'17, Tampa Bay Buccaneers '12-'13), assistant coach, and quality control analyst. Before that he served two stints as an assistant coach at Army, coaching the linebackers from 1995 to 1996 and the defensive backs from 1999 to 2000. He graduated from West Point in 1989 and played defensive back while at the academy.

On April 1, it was announced that Tenarius "Tank" Wright was hired as the new defensive line coach, coming to the Black Knights after spending two seasons as the Associate Director of Football Strength and Conditioning at Michigan. A 2012 graduate of Arkansas, where he played from 2008 to 2012, he was hired following the opening of an assistant coach position due to the departure of nickelbacks coach Josh Christian-Young to Tulane on March 3.

There were several other departures from the support staff during the first half of the year: Defensive Quality Control Analyst Rick Lyster left to serve as the outside linebackers coach at Fordham; Assistant Director of recruiting Operations Devon Doyle was hired by Coastal Carolina to serve as their Director of recruiting; and Jim Collins (director of player personnel), Lawrence Scott (director of player development), and Brett Moore (director of On-Campus Recruiting) all stepped down from their positions. To replace these departures, several support staff were hired: John French was hired as the new Offensive Quality Control Analyst; Al Ades was hired as the new Defensive Quality Control Analyst; Brandon Reyes and Blair Vaughan were hired as new Assistant Strength and Conditioning coaches; Joe Manion was hired as the new Director of recruiting Operations; Greg Svarczkopf was hired as the new Director of On-Campus Recruiting; Rob De Los Santos was hired as the Director of Content Marketing/recruiting Assistant; and former player and 2013 graduate Raymond Maples was hired as the new Director of player development. Following these hires, Monken's 2020 staff changeover was completed.

==== Spring session and summer camp ====
The spring season, normally consisting of 14 practices and the Black and Gold Spring Game, was canceled on March 16 following the collective decision of the Patriot League presidents and superintendents to cancel all spring sports due to the COVID-19 pandemic. The Corps of Cadets did not return from spring break and completed the rest of their semester virtually from home, with only the firsties returning in June to attend graduation. In an interview, Coach Monken said the team was able to meet virtually with their assistant coaches to check on their mental well-being as well as go over "X's and O's."

The team returned to West Point in the latter half of June to attend the Summer Term Academic Program, complete required military training, and begin team summer workouts. The 77-strong plebe class (43 from USMAPS) reported for Reception Day from July 12–14. On August 6, padded practices for fall camp began and it was announced that firstie offensive lineman Mike Johnson, firstie fullback Sandon McCoy, and firstie linebacker Amadeo West were selected as the 2020 team captains. Camp broke for the beginning of the fall semester with a pair of intra-squad scrimmages in Michie Stadium on August 15.

=== Award watch lists ===
Listed in the order that they were released.

Award	Player	Position	Year
Wuerffel Trophy	Joe Stephenson	LB	SR
Lott IMPACT Trophy	Amadeo West	LB	SR
Rimington Trophy	Connor Bishop	C	SO
Ray Guy Award	Zach Harding	P	JR
Senior CLASS Award	Amadeo West	LB	SR
Chuck Bednarik Award	Jon Rhattigan	LB	SR

== Personnel ==
=== Coaching staff ===
Name	Position	First year position	First year Army	Alma mater
Jeff Monken	Head coach	2014	2014	Millikin
Offensive staff
Brent Davis	Offensive coordinator/offensive line	2014	2014	Georgia
Matt Drinkall	Tight ends	2020	2019	Western Illinois–Quad Cities
Keith Gaither	Wide receivers	2020	2020^{1}	Elon
Saga Tuitele	Offensive line	2020	2020^{2}	Portland State
Mike Viti	Fullbacks	2016	2016	Army
Tucker Waugh	Slotbacks	2015	2007^{3}	DePauw
Cody Worley	Quarterbacks	2020	2020	Furman
Defensive staff
Nate Woody	Defensive coordinator	2020	2020	Wofford
Daryl Dixon	Cornerbacks	2019	2016	Florida
Greg Gasparato	Co-defensive coordinator/safeties	2020	2020	Wofford
John Loose	Assistant head coach/outside linebackers	2020	2014^{4}	Ithaca
Shiel Wood	Inside linebackers	2020	2020	Wofford
Tank Wright	Defensive line	2020	2020	Arkansas
Special teams staff
Sean Saturnio	Special teams coordinator	2020	2014	Hawaii
Quality control staff
John French	Offensive Quality Control	2020	2020	Kentucky
Al Ades	Defensive Quality Control	2020	2020	Michigan
Strength and conditioning staff
Scott Swanson	Director of strength and conditioning	1998	1998^{5}	Wake Forest
Conor Hughes	Head Football Strength and Conditioning	2019	2017	Springfield (Mass.)
Colin Kenyon	Assistant Football Strength and Conditioning	2019	2019	Merrimack
Brandon Reyes	Assistant Football Strength and Conditioning	2020	2020	West Florida
Blair Vaughan	Assistant Football Strength and Conditioning	2020	2020	Western Kentucky
GC Yerry	Assistant Football Strength and Conditioning	2019	2019	Stony Brook
Support staff
Clayton Kendrick-Holmes	Chief of Staff/director of football operations	2018	2018	Navy
CPT Zachary Reichert	Assistant Director of football operations	2019	2019	Army
CPT Blake Powers	Admissions Support Officer	2018	2018	Indiana
Ray Maples	Director of player development	2020	2020	Army
Mike Sullivan	Director of recruiting	2020	1995^{6}	Army
Tanner Dupuis	Assistant Director of recruiting/Content	2019	2019	Georgia Southern
Joe Manion	Director of recruiting Operations	2019	2019	Saint Joseph's
Danny Payne	Director of Scouting	2017	2017	Kennesaw State
Rob De Los Santos	Director of Content Marketing/recruiting Assistant	2020	2020	East Stroudsburg
Greg Svarczkopf	Director of On-Campus Recruiting	2020	2020	Indiana
Jack O'Reilly	Director of Video Operations	2018	2018	Clemson
Michael Zeoli	Assistant Director of Video Operations	2017	2017	William Paterson

1. Keith Gaither also served as the wide receivers coach at Army from 2015 to 2016
2. Saga Tuitele also served as the offensive line coach at Army from 2007 to 2008.
3. Tucker Waugh also served as the wide receivers coach at Army from 2000 to 2004.
4. John Loose also served as the linebackers coach at Army from 1992 to 1999.
5. Scott Swanson also served as an assistant strength & conditioning coach at Army from 1995 to 1996.
6. Mike Sullivan also served at Army as the defensive backs coach from 1999 to 2000 and the linebackers coach from 1995 to 1996.

=== Roster ===
The Army football roster for the Week 1 game versus Middle Tennessee (as of August 30, 2020):

2020 Army Black Knights roster
Quarterback: 1 Jabari Laws, Junior (5'9, 185); 2 Tyhier Tyler, Sophomore (5'8, 185); 4 Christian Anderson, Junior (6'1, 195); 7 Jemel Jones, Sophomore (5'10, 210); 8 Christian Parrish, Freshman (6'0, 210); 9 Maurice Bellan, Sophomore (5'10, 190); 13 Bryson Daily, Freshman (6'1, 220); 15 Jaylon West, Freshman (6'1, 180); 16 Alijah Curtis, Freshman (5'10, 190); 18 Cade Ballard, Sophomore (5'9, 205); 19 Delshawn Traylor, Freshman (5'10, 195); Slot Back: 5 A.J. Howard, Junior (6'0, 205); 10 Jordan Blackman, Senior (5'11, 190); 11 Brandon Walters, Junior (5'11, 185); 15 Braheam Murphy, Sophomore (5'10, 185); 19 Dominic Distefano, Senior (5'9, 190); 21 Tyrell Robinson, Freshman (5'9, 180); 22 Aaron Adams, Freshman (5'8, 170); 25 Markens Pierre, Junior (5'11, 205); 27 Bo Turner, Freshman (5'10, 175); 28 Justin Lescouflair, Sophomore (5'10, 190); 32 Artice Hobbs IV, Senior (5'9, 190); 36 Keiran Grant, Freshman (5'10, 190); 39 Ay'Juan Marshall, Freshman (5'11, 190); 42 Shacori Williams, Freshman (5'10, 220); Fullback: 3 Sandon McCoy, Senior (5'11, 230); 23 Anthony Adkins, Sophomore (6'1, 255); 30 Cole Truex, Sophomore (6'2, 240); 33 Jakobi Buchanan, Sophomore (6'0, 260); 38 Tyson Riley, Freshman (6'2, 260); 40 Cade Barnard, Junior (6'3, 235); 44 Nick Mell, Freshman (6'2, 235); Wide receiver: 9 Brandon Jones, Freshman (6'1, 205); 14 Michael Roberts, Junior (6'3, 235); 29 Cole Caterbone, Sophomore (6'1, 200); 80 Ryan Jackovic, Sophomore (6'5, 220); 82 Veshe Daniyan, Sophomore (6'1, 200); 83 Reikan Donaldson, Sophomore (6'2, 190); 85 Andrew Bruster-Young, Freshman (5'11, 205); 86 Isaiah Alston, Freshman (6'4, 200); 87 Sean Eckert, Junior (6'3, 220); 88 Camden Harrison, Senior (6'2, 208); 89 Jalen Moy, Junior (6'4, 210); Antonio White, Freshman; Long snapper: 39 Paul Lawless, Senior (6'3, 240); 48 Kyle O'Connor, Senior (6'1, 225); 49 Patrick Szczesniak, Sophomore (6'2, 240); 83 Ryan Aguilar, Sophomore (6'2, 240); 85 Cole McCutcheon, Freshman (5'11, 195); Kicker: 1 Landon Salyers, Senior (6'1, 200); 29 Quinn Maretzki, Freshman; 96 Cole Talley, Sophomore (6'0, 205); 99 Andrew Bagley, Sophomore (5'11, 190)	Tight end: 43 Joshua Lingenfelter, Freshman (6'3, 235); 45 Simon Dellinger, Freshman (6'3, 265); 46 Shane Sunday, Freshman (6'2, 230); 48 Garrett Woodall, Freshman (6'3, 230); 49 Ben Koch, Sophomore (6'6, 265); 69 Paxton Nayman, Freshman (6'5, 275); 81 Jake Lauer, Senior (6'3, 265); 84 Shayne Buckingham, Sophomore (6'4, 260); 85 Chris Cameron, Junior (6'4, 260); Offensive lineman: 50 Robert Fitzsimmons, Sophomore (6'5, 305); 51 Kamaron Holloway, Junior (6'3, 280); 53 Jackson Filipowicz, Freshman (6'3, 260); 54 Blake Harris, Sophomore (6'2, 295); 54 Beau Lombardi, Freshman (6'2, 280); 55 JB Hunter, Senior (6'4, 290); 56 Mason Kolinchak, Junior (6'2, 280); 57 Connor Bishop, Sophomore (6'3, 290); 58 Sam Barczak, Sophomore (6'2, 290); 59 Mike Johnson, Senior (6'3, 285); 60 Connor Finucane, Freshman (6'4, 285); 62 Aidan Perkins, Freshman (6'2, 260); 63 Carson Shaffer, Sophomore (6'3, 300); 64 Cameron Callaway, Freshman (6'0, 275); 65 Noah Knapp, Junior (6'0, 285); 66 DJ Fuller Jr., Sophomore (6'3, 290); 67 Dean Powell, Junior (6'1, 290); 68 Luke McCleery, Senior (6'5, 290); 70 Zach Ward, Junior (6'6, 285); 71 Daniel Parrish, Sophomore (6'0, 290); 72 Aidan Gaines, Freshman (6'0, 280); 73 Dayton Baugh, Freshman (6'4, 270); 74 Jose Taveras, Sophomore (6'4, 300); 75 David Hayward, Freshman (6'3, 255); 76 Peyton Reeder, Senior (6'6, 300); 77 Jordyn Law, Freshman (6'4, 285); 78 Cody Winokur, Sophomore (6'2, 285); 79 Cade Hawley, Sophomore (6'4, 270); Defensive lineman: 55 Edriece Patterson, Senior (6'3, 255); 57 Caleb Tomlin, Freshman (5'11, 260); 60 David Gray, Sophomore (6'4, 300); 62 Nikai Butler, Freshman (6'2, 265); 64 Spencer Roy, Freshman (6'3, 240); 70 Grayson Gilder, Freshman (6'1, 265); 72 Grady Chapman, Sophomore (6'4, 270); 81 Kaghen Roach, Freshman (6'4, 255); 82 Declan O'Leary, Freshman (6'3, 250); 84 Nathan Lusk, Freshman (6'3, 235); 86 Jordan Funk, Freshman (6'3, 260); 89 Gerald Irons III, Freshman (5'11, 280); 90 Jack Hough, Senior (6'3, 280); 91 Ryan Duran III, Junior (6'5, 270); 92 Isaiah Filisi, Freshman (6'3, 280); 93 Tyler Komorowski, Sophomore (6'3, 290); 94 Nick Stokes, Senior (6'5, 300); 95 Nolan Cockrill, Junior (6'3, 280); 96 Darius Richardson, Sophomore (6'2, 285); 97 Kwabena Bonsu, Junior (6'4, 280); 98 Dylan Perez, Freshman (6'1, 275); 99 Chris Frey, Sophomore (6'5, 280)	Linebacker: 11 Jackson Powell, Freshman (6'0, 230); 31 Joe Stephenson, Senior (6'0, 235); 32 Jaylen Jacobs, Freshman (6'2, 220); 34 Andre Carter II, Sophomore (6'5, 265); 34 Benjamin Jackson, Freshman (6'0, 225); 36 Peyton Hampton, Sophomore (6'1, 226); 38 Fabrice Voyne, Sophomore (6'2, 240); 40 Bryce Mullenix, Freshman (6'2, 235); 42 Wilson Catoe, Junior (6'2, 240); 43 Jeremiah Lowery, Senior (6'2, 255); 44 Nathaniel Smith, Sophomore (6'3, 260); 45 Spencer Jones, Freshman (6'1, 240); 46 Connor Butt, Freshman (5'11, 205); 47 Jonzell Prudhomme, Freshman (6'2, 215); 47 Jon Rhattigan, Senior (6'1, 245); 49 Kemonte Yow, Junior (6'1, 240); 50 JT Penick, Sophomore (6'3, 240); 51 Trent Brown, Freshman (6'2, 245); 52 Amadeo West, Senior (6'2, 245); 53 Arik Smith, Junior (6'0, 240); 54 Dom Barbuto, Freshman (6'0, 230); 55 Trey Stephens, Freshman; 56 Austin Hill, Freshman (6'1, 235); 58 Keeron Henderson, Freshman (6'2, 225); 58 Camden O'Gara, Freshman (6'0, 230); 59 Henry Janeway, Sophomore (6'4, 245); Defensive back: 1 Daelan Smith, Freshman (5'10, 185); 2 Malkelm Morrison, Junior (5'10, 190); 3 Julian McDuffie, Junior (5'11, 182); 4 Jabari Moore, Sophomore (5'11, 195); 5 Cameron Nash, Freshman (5'8, 155); 6 Caleb John, Junior (5'10, 195); 7 Kolubah Pewee, Freshman (5'9, 170); 7 Jimmy Ciarlo, Freshman (6'2, 220); 8 Javhari Bourdeau, Senior (5'9, 188); 9 Aaron Bibbins, Freshman (6'1, 195); 13 Chris Skyers, Senior (5'11, 190); 14 Bo Nicolas-Paul, Freshman (5'11, 190); 16 D'Andre Tobias, Sophomore (5'11, 210); 17 Tyler Brennan, Freshman (5'11, 200); 17 Isaiah Morris, Sophomore (5'11, 185); 18 Cole Mabry, Sophomore (6'2, 205); 20 Marquel Broughton, Sophomore (5'10, 213); 22 Cedrick Cunningham Jr., Junior (6'0, 215); 23 Leo Lowin, Freshman (6'0, 210); 25 Deante Bernard, Freshman (5'11, 190); 25 Elijah Boyd, Sophomore (6'2, 205); 26 Max Williams, Freshman (5'10, 190); 26 Quindrelin Hammonds, Sophomore (6'0, 188); 27 Cameron Jones, Sophomore (5'9, 185); 33 Seth Daniels, Freshman (5'11, 170); 30 Daryan McDonald, Sophomore (6'0, 230); 37 Hamilton Baker, Freshman (6'1, 215); Punter: 43 Brooks Hosea, Junior (6'0, 185); 46 Zach Harding, Junior (6'5, 220); 97 Billy Boehlke, Freshman (5'9, 200)

=== Depth chart ===
The Army football depth chart for the Week 16 game against Air Force (as of December 16, 2020):

Defense

FS
Cedrick Cunningham Jr.
Chris Skyers
⋅

APACHE	WILL	MIKE	DOG
Malkelm Morrison	Jon Rhattigan	Arik Smith	Jeremiah Lowery
Daryan McDonald	Fabrice Voyne	Spencer Jones	Andre Carter II
⋅	⋅	⋅	⋅

SS
Marquel Broughton
Aaron Bibbins
⋅

CB
Jabari Moore
Caleb John
⋅

DE	NT	DE
Kwabena Bonsu	Nolan Cockrill	Amadeo West
Jordan Funk	Nick Stokes	Ryan Duran
Chris Frey	⋅	⋅

CB
Javhari Bourdeau
Cameron Jones
⋅

Offense

WR
Cole Caterbone
Ryan Jackovic
⋅

SB
Tyrell Robinson*
A.J. Howard*
⋅

LT	LG	C	RG	RT
Luke McCleery	Mike Johnson	Connor Bishop	Peyton Reeder	JB Hunter
Kamaron Holloway	Connor Finucane	Noah Knapp	Mason Kolinchak	Jordyn Law
⋅	⋅	⋅	⋅	⋅

SB
Brandon Walters
Braheam Murphy
⋅

WR
Artice Hobbs IV
Isaiah Alston
⋅

QB
Tyhier Tyler
Christian Anderson
Cade Ballard

Key reserves
TE − Chris Cameron
Tyson Riley

KO – Landon Salyers*
Quinn Maretzki*

FB
Sandon McCoy
Cade Barnard
Jakobi Buchanan

Special teams
PK − Quinn Maretzki*
Landon Salyers*
P − Zach Harding*
Brooks Hosea*
KR − Tyrell Robinson*
OR A.J. Howard*
Ay'Juan Marshall
Brandon Walters
PR − Tyrell Robinson*
Jordan Blackman
LS − Kyle O'Connor
Paul Lawless
H − Brooks Hosea*
Zach Harding*

Depth Chart 2020
True Freshman
Double Position : *

== Schedule ==
Army had games scheduled against Bucknell, Buffalo, Eastern Michigan, Miami (OH), Oklahoma, Princeton, UConn, and UMass, which were canceled due to the COVID-19 pandemic. The game with Rice was postponed indefinitely due to the movement of the start of the Rice season to September 26 and was never rescheduled. A replacement schedule consisting of eleven games was announced on August 24, with the twelfth and final game against Cincinnati announced on August 26. The game with BYU, scheduled for September 19 as part of the replacement slate of games, was postponed indefinitely on September 12 with both the academy and BYU pledging to attempt to reschedule the game for a later date. On October 23, it was jointly announced by West Point athletic director Mike Buddie and Naval Academy athletic director Chet Gladchuk that the 121st Army–Navy Game would be moved from Lincoln Financial Field in Philadelphia to Michie Stadium at West Point due to "attendance limits placed on outdoor events in the state of Pennsylvania that would not allow the entire Corps of Cadets and Brigade of Midshipmen to attend." Because Army was to serve as the designated home team in 2020, Michie Stadium was selected to host. This will be the first time an Army–Navy Game will be held at a home site since World War II when the 1942 game was held in Annapolis and the 1943 game was held at West Point, both being Navy victories. The Air Force game, originally scheduled for November 7, was postponed indefinitely on November 5 with both schools saying they would reschedule the game if possible. On November 25, it was announced that the Air Force game would be rescheduled for December 19 between the Army–Navy Game and the Independence Bowl. As a result, the postponed BYU game was not rescheduled.

Date	Time	Opponent	Rank	Site	TV	Result	Attendance
September 5	1:30 p.m.	Middle Tennessee		Michie Stadium; West Point, NY	CBSSN	W 42–0	5,249
September 12	1:30 p.m.	Louisiana–Monroe		Michie Stadium; West Point, NY	CBSSN	W 37–7	5,362
September 19	3:30 p.m.	No. 21 BYU	No. 22	Michie Stadium; West Point, NY	CBS	No contest	
September 26	3:30 p.m.	at No. 14 Cincinnati	No. 22	Nippert Stadium; Cincinnati, OH	ESPN	L 10–24	0
October 3	1:30 p.m.	Abilene Christian		Michie Stadium; West Point, NY	CBSSN	W 55–23	5,306
October 10	1:30 p.m.	The Citadel		Michie Stadium; West Point, NY	CBSSN	W 14–9	5,344
October 17	1:30 p.m.	at UTSA		Alamodome; San Antonio, TX	CBSSN	W 28–16	7,887
October 24	12:00 p.m.	Mercer		Michie Stadium; West Point, NY	CBSSN	W 49–3	5,181
November 14	12:00 p.m.	at Tulane		Yulman Stadium; New Orleans, LA	ESPN2	L 12–38	1,200
November 21	12:00 p.m.	Georgia Southern		Michie Stadium; West Point, NY	CBSSN	W 28–27	5,078
December 12	3:00 p.m.	Navy		Michie Stadium; West Point, NY (Army–Navy Game, Commander-in-Chief's Trophy, College GameDay)	CBS	W 15–0	12,722
December 19	3:00 p.m.	Air Force		Michie Stadium; West Point, NY (Commander-in-Chief's Trophy)	CBSSN	W 10–7	1,306
December 31	4:00 p.m.	vs. West Virginia		Liberty Bowl Memorial Stadium; Memphis, TN (Liberty Bowl)	ESPN	L 21–24	8,187
Rankings from AP Poll and College Football Playoff Rankings after November 24 released prior to game; All times are in Eastern time

== Rankings ==
Ranking movements Legend: ██ Increase in ranking ██ Decrease in ranking — = Not ranked RV = Received votes
	Week																	
Poll	Pre	1	2	3	4	5	6	7	8	9	10	11	12	13	14	15	16	Final
AP	—	—*	22	22	RV	RV	RV	RV	RV	RV	RV	—	—	—	RV	RV	RV	RV
Coaches	—	—*	25	RV	RV	RV	RV	RV	25	22	25	RV	RV	RV	RV	RV	RV	RV
CFP	Not released												—	—	—	—	—	Not released

== Game summaries ==
=== Middle Tennessee ===
Middle Tennessee Blue Raiders at Army Black Knights

Quarter	1	2	3	4	Total
Blue Raiders	0	0	0	0	0
Black Knights	7	14	14	7	42

at Michie Stadium, West Point, NY

- Date: September 5, 2020
- Game time: 1:30 p.m. EDT
- Game weather: Temperature: 80 °F (27 °C) • Wind: SW 6 mph • Weather: Sunny
- Game attendance: 5,249
- Referee: Mike Roche
- TV announcers (CBSSN): Ben Holden (play-by-play), Ross Tucker (analyst) & Tina Cervasio (sideline)
- ESPN – McCoy runs for three touchdowns and Army wins 42–0 /// Box Score, Middle Tennessee at Army /// Pregame Notes /// Postgame Notes /// Cunningham named Bednarik Player of the Week /// Woody named Athlon Sports Defensive coordinator of the Week

Game information

First quarter

- (09:46) ARMY TD – Sandon McCoy 1-yard rush, Landon Salyers kick
  Drive: 9 plays, 43 yards, 4:00; Army 7–0

Second quarter

- (14:06) ARMY TD – Sandon McCoy 2-yard rush, Landon Salyers kick
  Drive: 19 plays, 85 yards, 9:13; Army 14–0
- (07:14) ARMY TD – Sandon McCoy 4-yard rush, Landon Salyers kick
  Drive: 10 plays, 41 yards, 4:25; Army 21–0

Third quarter

- (10:48) ARMY TD – Christian Anderson 24-yard rush, Landon Salyers kick
  Drive: 7 plays, 71 yards, 4:07; Army 28–0
- (06:33) ARMY TD – Jon Rhattigan 43-yard interception return, Landon Salyers kick
  Drive: 0 plays, 0 yards, 0:00; Army 35–0

Fourth quarter

- (04:06) ARMY TD – Anthony Adkins 22-yard rush, Quinn Maretzki kick
  Drive: 19 plays, 99 yards, 12:26; Army 42–0

Passing

- MTSU – Chase Cunningham – 7/10, 63 yards
- ARMY – Christian Anderson – 2/4, 28 yards

Rushing

- MTSU – Chaton Mobley – 5 carries, 27 yards
- ARMY – Tyrell Robinson – 9 carries, 94 yards

Receiving

- MTSU – Jarrin Pierce – 4 receptions, 33 yards
- ARMY – Isaiah Alston – 1 reception, 18 yards

Defense

- MTSU – Reed Blankenship – 9 total tackles (5 solo, 4 assisted), 1 tackle for loss
- ARMY – Cedrick Cunningham Jr. – 7 total tackles (5 solo, 2 assisted), 1 sack, 2 tackles for loss, 1 forced fumble

Statistics	MTSU	ARMY
First downs	13	24
3rd down efficiency	3–9	13–15
4th down efficiency	2–2	1–1
Plays–yards	48–184	66–368
Rushes–yards	24–75	62–340
Passing yards	109	28
Passing: Comp–Att–Int	16–24–2	2–4–0
Penalties–yards	5–53	7–74
Turnovers	4	0
Time of possession	24:31	35:29

=== Louisiana–Monroe ===
Louisiana–Monroe Warhawks at Army Black Knights

Quarter	1	2	3	4	Total
Warhawks	0	7	0	0	7
Black Knights	14	3	13	7	37

at Michie Stadium, West Point, NY

- Date: September 12, 2020
- Game time: 1:30 p.m. EDT
- Game weather: Temperature: 71 °F (22 °C) • Wind: E 5 mph • Weather: Mostly Sunny
- Game attendance: 5,362
- Referee: Mike Roche
- TV announcers (CBSSN): Ben Holden (play-by-play), Ross Tucker (analyst) & Tina Cervasio (sideline)
- ESPN – Anderson, Buchanan lead Army over Louisiana–Monroe 37–7 /// Box Score, Louisiana–Monroe at Army /// Pregame Notes /// Postgame Notes

Game information

First Quarter

- (04:27) ARMY TD – Christian Anderson 5-yard rush, Landon Salyers kick
  Drive: 15 plays, 60 yards, 8:13; Army 7–0
- (01:47) ARMY TD – Sandon McCoy 2-yard rush, Landon Salyers kick
  Drive: 4 plays, 61 yards, 1:01; Army 14–0

Second Quarter

- (02:12) ULM TD – Malik Jackson 6-yard pass from Colby Suits, Davis Hughes kick
  Drive: 7 plays, 64 yards, 3:56; Army 14–7
- (00:02) ARMY FG – Landon Salyers 40-yard field goal
  Drive: 3 plays, 24 yards, 0:25; Army 17–3

Third Quarter

- (06:22) ARMY TD – Christian Anderson 6-yard rush, Landon Salyers kick
  Drive: 8 plays, 65 yards, 4:41; Army 24–7
- (00:25) ARMY TD – Jakobi Buchanan 25-yard rush, Landon Salyers kick failed
  Drive: 7 plays, 54 yards, 3:38; Army 30–7

Fourth Quarter

- (05:58) ARMY TD – Jakobi Buchanan 40-yard rush, Quinn Maretzki kick
  Drive: 9 plays, 72 yards, 5:38; Army 37–7

Passing

- ULM – Colby Suits: 14/19, 148 yards, 1 TD
- ARMY – Jemel Jones: 1/2, 29 yards

Rushing

- ULM – Josh Johnson: 12 carries, 38 yards
- ARMY – Jakobi Buchanan: 11 carries, 106 yards, 2 TD

Receiving

- ULM – Josh Pederson: 5 receptions, 56 yards
- ARMY – Isaiah Alston: 1 reception, 29 yards

Defense

- ULM – Traveion Webster: 11 total tackles (5 solo, 6 assisted), 1 quarterback hurry
- ARMY – Nolan Cockrill: 6 total tackles (2 solo, 4 assisted), 1.5 tackles for loss, 1 forced fumble, 1 pass break-up, 1 field goal block

Statistics	ULM	ARMY
First downs	9	24
3rd down efficiency	4–12	7–13
4th down efficiency	0–0	3–4
Plays–yards	44–200	70–465
Rushes–yards	20–37	65–436
Passing yards	163	29
Passing: Comp–Att–Int	16–24–1	1–5–0
Penalties–yards	4–30	4–37
Turnovers	2	1
Time of possession	23:13	36:47

=== BYU ===
CANCELLED – ~~No. 21 BYU Cougars at No. 22 Army Black Knights~~

Quarter	1	2	Total
~~No. 21 Cougars~~			0
~~No. 22 Black Knights~~			0

at ~~Michie Stadium, West Point, NY~~

- Date: ~~September 19, 2020~~
- Game time: ~~3:30 p.m. EDT~~
- TV: ~~CBS~~
- ~~ESPN – BYU Cougars at Army Black Knights Preview~~

=== At Cincinnati ===
No. 22 Army Black Knights at No. 14 Cincinnati Bearcats

Quarter	1	2	3	4	Total
No. 22 Black Knights	7	0	0	3	10
No. 14 Bearcats	3	7	7	7	24

at Nippert Stadium, Cincinnati, OH

- Date: September 26, 2020
- Game time: 3:30 p.m. EDT
- Game weather: Temperature: 79 °F (26 °C) • Wind: SSW 7 mph • Weather: Partly Cloudy
- Game attendance: 0
- Referee: Charles Lamertina
- TV announcers (ESPN): Mark Jones (play-by-play), Dusty Dvoracek (analyst) & Quint Kessenich (sideline)
- ESPN – No. 14 Cincinnati holds off No. 22 Army, 24–10 /// Box Score, No. 22 Army at No. 14 Cincinnati /// Pregame Notes /// Postgame Notes

Game information

First Quarter

- (14:09) ARMY TD – Jabari Moore 41-yard fumble recovery, Landon Salyers kick
  Drive: 0 plays, 0 yards, 0:00; Army 7–0
- (10:50) CIN FG – Cole Smith 33-yard field goal
  Drive: 8 plays, 48 yards, 3:19; Army 7–3

Second Quarter

- (07:25) CIN TD – Michael Young Jr. 12-yard pass from Desmond Ridder, Cole Smith kick
  Drive: 14 plays, 91 yards, 6:10; Cincinnati 10–7

Third Quarter

- (08:00) CIN TD – Jerome Ford 4-yard rush, Cole Smith kick
  Drive: 7 plays, 60 yards, 2:48; Cincinnati 17–7

Fourth Quarter

- (14:56) ARMY FG – Landon Salyers 36-yard field goal
  Drive: 9 plays, 73 yards, 4:59; Cincinnati 17–10
- (06:55) CIN TD – Gerrid Doaks 60-yard pass from Desmond Ridder, Cole Smith kick
  Drive: 2 plays, 68 yards, 0:51; Cincinnati 24–10

Passing

- ARMY – Christian Anderson: 9/21, 94 yards, 1 INT
- CIN – Desmond Ridder: 18/33, 258 yards, 2 TD, 1 INT

Rushing

- ARMY – Christian Anderson: 22 carries, 81 yards
- CIN – Jerome Ford: 8 carries, 34 yards, 1 TD

Receiving

- ARMY – Michael Roberts: 3 receptions, 46 yards
- CIN – Jayshon Jackson: 4 receptions, 75 yards

Defense

- ARMY – Jon Rhattigan: 8 total tackles (4 solo, 4 assisted), 2 pass break-ups
- CIN – Jarell White: 15 total tackles (8 solo, 7 assisted), 1 tackle for loss, 1 quarterback hurry

Statistics	ARMY	CIN
First downs	18	14
3rd down efficiency	3–13	8–18
4th down efficiency	0–2	0–1
Plays–yards	64–276	69–331
Rushes–yards	43–182	35–69
Passing yards	94	262
Passing: Comp–Att–Int	9–21–1	19–34–1
Penalties–yards	10–87	7–79
Turnovers	2	2
Time of possession	30:32	29:28

=== Abilene Christian ===
Abilene Christian Wildcats at Army Black Knights

Quarter	1	2	3	4	Total
Wildcats	0	3	7	13	23
Black Knights	7	16	15	17	55

at Michie Stadium, West Point, NY

- Date: October 3, 2020
- Game time: 1:30 p.m. EDT
- Game weather: Temperature: 62 °F (17 °C) • Wind: W 7 mph • Weather: Sunny
- Game attendance: 5,306
- Referee: Jerry McGinn
- TV announcers (CBSSN): Ben Holden (play-by-play), Ross Tucker (analyst) & Tina Cervasio (sideline)
- ESPN – Jones accounts for 3 TDs, Army beats Abilene Christian 55–23 /// Box Score, Abilene Christian at Army /// Pregame Notes /// Postgame Notes

Game information

First Quarter

- (08:20) ARMY TD – Sandon McCoy 1-yard rush, Landon Salyers kick
  Drive: 10 plays, 45 yards, 5:19; Army 7–0

Second Quarter

- (14:55) ARMY FG – Landon Salyers 43-yard field goal
  Drive: 6 plays, 39 yards, 3:37; Army 10–0
- (12:37) ARMY TD – Jemel Jones 3-yard rush, Landon Salyers kick failed
  Drive: 2 plays, 16 yards, 0:16; Army 16–0
- (10:15) ARMY TD – Jakobi Buchanan 3-yard rush, Landon Salyers kick
  Drive: 5 plays, 58 yards, 2:18; Army 23–0
- (07:59) ACU FG – Blair Zepeda 31-yard field goal
  Drive: 6 plays, 62 yards, 2:08; Army 23–3

Third Quarter

- (13:27) ARMY TD – Michael Roberts 33-yard pass from Jemel Jones, Artice Hobbs IV rush
  Drive: 3 plays, 75 yards, 1:33; Army 31–3
- (04:18) ACU TD – Kobe Clark 2-yard pass from Peyton Mansell, Blair Zepeda kick
  Drive: 9 plays, 61 yards, 4:04; Army 31–10
- (02:56) ARMY TD – Jemel Jones 49-yard rush, Landon Salyers kick
  Drive: 3 plays, 68 yards, 1:15; Army 38–10

Fourth Quarter

- (11:12) ARMY FG – Quinn Maretzki 40-yard field goal
  Drive: 11 plays, 55 yards, 4:25; Army 41–10
- (08:29) ACU TD – Kobe Clark 45-yard pass from Peyton Mansell, Blair Zepeda kick
  Drive: 5 plays, 80 yards, 2:35; Army 41–17
- (04:29) ARMY TD – Anthony Adkins 3-yard rush, Quinn Maretzki kick
  Drive: 8 plays, 76 yards, 3:58; Army 48–17
- (03:01) ACU TD – Branden Hohenstein 61-yard pass from Peyton Mansell, Blair Zepeda kick failed
  Drive: 3 plays, 74 yards, 1:23; Army 48–23
- (00:37) ARMY TD – Anthony Adkins 28-yard rush, Quinn Maretzki kick
  Drive: 5 plays, 46 yards, 2:24; Army 55–23

Passing

- ACU – Peyton Mansell: 23/37, 279 yards, 3 TD
- ARMY – Jemel Jones: 4/7, 52 yards, 1 TD

Rushing

- ACU – L.J. McConnell: 2 carries, 59 yards
- ARMY – Jemel Jones: 14 carries, 138 yards, 2 TD

Receiving

- ACU – L.J. McConnell: 11 receptions, 101 yards
- ARMY – Michael Roberts: 2 receptions, 38 yards, 1 TD

Defense

- ACU – Jordan Paup: 8 total tackles (3 solo, 5 assisted)
- ARMY – Marquel Broughton: 8 total tackles (7 solo, 1 assisted), 1 forced fumble

Statistics	ACU	ARMY
First downs	19	24
3rd down efficiency	1–10	3–11
4th down efficiency	1–3	2–3
Plays–yards	62–388	67–493
Rushes–yards	23–86	60–441
Passing yards	302	52
Passing: Comp–Att–Int	25–39–0	4–7–0
Penalties–yards	6–48	4–27
Turnovers	0	0
Time of possession	28:15	31:45

=== The Citadel ===
The Citadel Bulldogs at Army Black Knights

Quarter	1	2	3	4	Total
Bulldogs	3	0	0	6	9
Black Knights	0	7	7	0	14

at Michie Stadium, West Point, NY

- Date: October 10, 2020
- Game time: 1:30 p.m. EDT
- Game weather: Temperature: 74 °F (23 °C) • Wind: S 10 mph • Weather: Sunny
- Game attendance: 5,344
- Referee: Larry Sanders
- TV announcers (CBSSN): Ben Holden (play-by-play), Ross Tucker (analyst) & Tina Cervasio (sideline)
- ESPN – The Citadel Bulldogs at Army Black Knights /// Box Score, The Citadel at Army /// Pregame Notes /// Postgame Notes

Game information

First Quarter

- (00:00) CIT FG – Colby Kintner 39-yard field goal
  Drive: 5 plays, 28 yards, 2:23; The Citadel 3–0

Second Quarter

- (02:57) ARMY TD – Reikan Donaldson 29-yard pass from Jemel Jones, Landon Salyers kick
  Drive: 9 plays, 79 yards, 4:17; Army 7–3

Third Quarter

- (02:25) ARMY TD – Jemel Jones 5-yard rush, Landon Salyers kick
  Drive: 14 plays, 62 yards, 7:03; Army 14–3

Fourth Quarter

- (03:21) CIT TD – Darique Hampton 4-yard rush, Jaylan Adams pass failed
  Drive: 2 plays, 2 yards, 0:39; Army 14–9

Passing

- CIT – Brandon Rainey: 1/5, 50 yards, 2 INT
- ARMY – Jemel Jones: 4/10, 75 yards, 1 TD, 2 INT

Rushing

- CIT – Jaylan Adams: 14 carries, 55 yards
- ARMY – Jemel Jones: 17 carries, 49 yards, 1 TD

Receiving

- CIT – Raleigh Webb: 2 receptions, 55 yards
- ARMY – Reikan Donaldson: 2 receptions, 39 yards, 1 TD

Defense

- CIT – Sean-Thomas Faulkner: 16 total tackles (9 solo, 7 assisted), 1 tackle for loss
- ARMY – Arik Smith: 11 total tackles (4 solo, 7 assisted), 2 sacks, 3 tackles for loss

Statistics	CIT	ARMY
First downs	10	16
3rd down efficiency	3–12	3–13
4th down efficiency	2–3	3–4
Plays–yards	55–218	60–228
Rushes–yards	46–148	50–153
Passing yards	70	75
Passing: Comp–Att–Int	4–9–2	4–10–2
Penalties–yards	3–30	6–39
Turnovers	2	2
Time of possession	30:51	29:09

=== At UTSA ===
Army Black Knights at UTSA Roadrunners

Quarter	1	2	3	4	Total
Black Knights	7	7	7	7	28
Roadrunners	0	10	0	6	16

at Alamodome, San Antonio, TX

- Date: October 17, 2020
- Game time: 12:30 p.m. CDT
- Game weather: Temperature: 74 °F (23 °C) • Wind: N/A • Weather: Indoors
- Game attendance: 7,887
- Referee: Billy Williams
- TV announcers (CBSSN): Dave Ryan (play-by-play), Corey Chavous (analyst) & Justin Walters (sideline)
- ESPN – Army Black Knights at UTSA Roadrunners /// Box Score, Army at UTSA /// Pregame Notes /// Postgame Notes

Game information

First Quarter

- (10:03) ARMY TD – Anthony Adkins 66-yard rush, Landon Salyers kick
  Drive: 5 plays, 90 yards, 2:43; Army 7–0

Second Quarter

- (14:48) UTSA FG – Hunter Duplessis 50-yard field goal
  Drive: 14 plays, 53 yards, 5:05; Army 7–3
- (05:06) ARMY TD – Jakobi Buchanan 5-yard rush, Landon Salyers kick
  Drive: 13 plays, 74 yards, 6:27; Army 14–3
- (00:11) UTSA TD – Zakhari Franklin 1-yard pass from Lowell Narcisse, Hunter Duplessis kick
  Drive: 14 plays, 87 yards, 4:55; Army 14–10

Third Quarter

- (04:04) ARMY TD – Tyhier Tyler 37-yard rush, Landon Salyers kick
  Drive: 7 plays, 70 yards, 3:06; Army 21–10

Fourth Quarter

- (14:06) UTSA TD – Zakhari Franklin 11-yard pass from Frank Harris, Hunter Duplessis kick blocked
  Drive: 11 plays, 75 yards, 4:58; Army 21–16
- (12:47) ARMY TD – Cade Ballard 5-yard rush, Landon Salyers kick
  Drive: 4 plays, 75 yards, 1:19; Army 28–16

Passing

- ARMY – Cade Ballard: 1/3, 53 yards
- UTSA – Lowell Narcisse: 16/31, 155 yards, 1 TD

Rushing

- ARMY – Anthony Adkins: 8 carries, 101 yards, 1 TD
- UTSA – Sincere McCormick: 18 carries, 133 yards

Receiving

- ARMY – Camden Harrison: 1 reception, 53 yards
- UTSA – Zakhari Franklin: 12 receptions, 138 yards, 2 TD

Defense

- ARMY – Jon Rhattigan: 11 total tackles (5 solo, 6 assisted), 1 tackle for loss
- UTSA – Kelechi Nwachuku: 16 total tackles (9 solo, 7 assisted)

Statistics	ARMY	UTSA
First downs	24	24
3rd down efficiency	6–10	6–15
4th down efficiency	1–1	1–3
Plays–yards	63–358	71–383
Rushes–yards	60–305	32–197
Passing yards	53	186
Passing: Comp–Att–Int	1–3–0	19–39–0
Penalties–yards	5–51	9–85
Turnovers	1	0
Time of possession	33:29	26:31

=== Mercer ===
Mercer Bears at Army Black Knights

Quarter	1	2	3	4	Total
Bears	3	0	0	0	3
Black Knights	7	14	21	7	49

at Michie Stadium, West Point, NY

- Date: October 24, 2020
- Game time: 12:00 p.m. EDT
- Game weather: Temperature: 66 °F (19 °C) • Wind: WNW 8 mph • Weather: Cloudy
- Game attendance: 5,181
- Referee: Mike Roche
- TV announcers (CBSSN): Ben Holden (play-by-play), Ross Tucker (analyst) & Tina Cervasio (sideline)
- ESPN – Mercer Bears at Army Black Knights /// Box Score, Mercer at Army /// Pregame Notes /// Postgame Notes

Game information

First Quarter

- (08:08) MER FG – Caleb Dowden 36-yard field goal
  Drive: 15 plays, 56 yards, 6:52; Mercer 3–0
- (04:34) ARMY TD – Tyrell Robinson 53-yard pass from Cade Ballard, Landon Salyers kick
  Drive: 7 plays, 75 yards, 3:34; Army 7–3

Second Quarter

- (13:12) ARMY TD – Sandon McCoy 1-yard rush, Landon Salyers kick
  Drive: 11 plays, 39 yards, 5:36; Army 14–3
- (01:05) ARMY TD – Sandon McCoy 1-yard rush, Landon Salyers kick
  Drive: 8 plays, 38 yards, 3:55; Army 21–3

Third Quarter

- (10:39) ARMY TD – Cade Barnard 3-yard rush, Landon Salyers kick
  Drive: 8 plays, 40 yards, 4:13; Army 28–3
- (05:13) ARMY TD – Sandon McCoy 1-yard rush, Landon Salyers kick
  Drive: 9 plays, 59 yards, 3:57; Army 35–3
- (04:39) ARMY TD – Jabari Moore 29-yard interception return, Quinn Maretzki kick
  Drive: 0 plays, 0 yards, 0:00; Army 42–3

Fourth Quarter

- (01:00) ARMY TD – Jordan Blackman 6-yard rush, Quinn Maretzki kick
  Drive: 17 plays, 91 yards, 10:03; Army 49–3

Passing

- MER – Harrison Frost: 14/22, 94 yards, 3 INT
- ARMY – Cade Ballard: 1/1, 53 yards, 1 TD

Rushing

- MER – Tyray Devezin: 11 carries, 71 yards
- ARMY – Tyhier Tyler: 10 carries, 77 yards

Receiving

- MER – Zacch Davis: 2 receptions, 32 yards
- ARMY – Tyrell Robinson: 1 reception, 53 yards, 1 TD

Defense

- MER – Isaac Dowling: 16 total tackles (7 solo, 9 assisted), 2 sacks, 2 tackles for loss
- ARMY – Spencer Jones: 7 total tackles (3 solo, 4 assisted), 1.5 tackles for loss

Statistics	MER	ARMY
First downs	14	21
3rd down efficiency	6–13	8–14
4th down efficiency	0–0	4–4
Plays–yards	57–221	66–360
Rushes–yards	33–113	63–297
Passing yards	108	63
Passing: Comp–Att–Int	16–24–3	2–3–0
Penalties–yards	3–40	4–29
Turnovers	3	0
Time of possession	24:50	35:10

=== At Tulane ===
Army Black Knights at Tulane Green Wave

Quarter	1	2	3	4	Total
Black Knights	0	12	0	0	12
Green Wave	14	0	10	14	38

at Yulman Stadium, New Orleans, LA

- Date: November 14, 2020
- Game time: 11:00 a.m. CST
- Game weather: Temperature: 78 °F (26 °C) • Wind: SE 11 mph • Weather: Sunny and Warm
- Game attendance: 1,200
- Referee: Marcus Woods
- TV announcers (ESPN2): Joel Meyers (play-by-play) & Brian Kinchen (analyst)
- ESPN – Army Black Knights at Tulane Green Wave /// Box Score, Army at Tulane /// Pregame Notes /// Postgame Notes

Game information

First Quarter

- (08:55) TLN TD – Tyrick James 4-yard pass from Michael Pratt, Merek Glover kick
  Drive: 10 plays, 53 yards, 4:48; Tulane 7–0
- (00:47) TLN TD – Amare Jones 50-yard rush, Merek Glover kick
  Drive: 1 play, 50 yards, 0:11; Tulane 14–0

Second Quarter

- (10:25) ARMY TD – Tyrell Robinson 10-yard pass from Christian Anderson, Landon Salyers kick blocked
  Drive: 10 plays, 75 yards, 5:22; Tulane 14–6
- (04:12) ARMY TD – Christian Anderson 19-yard rush, Christian Anderson rush failed
  Drive: 8 plays, 59 yards, 4:36; Tulane 14–12

Third Quarter

- (10:23) TLN TD – Jha'Quan Jackson 21-yard pass from Michael Pratt, Merek Glover kick
  Drive: 9 plays, 75 yards, 4:37; Tulane 21–12
- (05:38) TLN FG – Merek Glover 26-yard field goal
  Drive: 8 plays, 45 yards, 3:27; Tulane 24–12

Fourth Quarter

- (04:26) TLN TD – Jha'Quan Jackson 14-yard rush, Merek Glover kick
  Drive: 2 plays, 17 yards, 0:58; Tulane 31–12
- (04:20) TLN TD – Jaetavian Toles 8-yard fumble recovery, Merek Glover kick
  Drive: 0 plays, 0 yards, 0:00; Tulane 38–12

Passing

- ARMY – Christian Anderson: 4/12, 36 yards, 1 TD, 2 INT
- TLN – Michael Pratt: 19/27, 197 yards, 2 TD

Rushing

- ARMY – Christian Anderson: 17 carries, 77 yards, 1 TD
- TLN – Amare Jones: 5 carries, 60 yards, 1 TD

Receiving

- ARMY – Michael Roberts: 1 reception, 12 yards
- TLN – Duece Watts: 6 receptions, 85 yards

Defense

- ARMY – Arik Smith: 8 total tackles (5 solo, 3 assisted)
- TLN – Dorian Williams/Marvin Moody (ea.): 7 total tackles (5 solo, 2 assisted), 1.5 tackles for loss

Statistics	ARMY	TLN
First downs	17	17
3rd down efficiency	6–17	6–13
4th down efficiency	2–5	1–1
Plays–yards	70–303	59–368
Rushes–yards	57–270	32–171
Passing yards	33	197
Passing: Comp–Att–Int	5–13–2	19–27–0
Penalties–yards	1–5	2–20
Turnovers	3	0
Time of possession	32:27	27:33

=== Georgia Southern ===
Georgia Southern Eagles at Army Black Knights

Quarter	1	2	3	4	Total
Eagles	14	7	6	0	27
Black Knights	0	7	14	7	28

at Michie Stadium, West Point, NY

- Date: November 21, 2020
- Game time: 12:00 p.m. EST
- Game weather: Temperature: 57 °F (14 °C) • Wind: W 10-15 mph • Weather: Clear
- Game attendance: 5,078
- Referee: Mike Roche
- TV announcers (CBSSN): Ben Holden (play-by-play), Ross Tucker (analyst) & Tina Cervasio (sideline)
- ESPN – Georgia Southern Eagles at Army Black Knights /// Box Score, Georgia Southern at Army /// Pregame Notes /// Postgame Notes

Game information

First Quarter

- (06:55) GASO TD – Shai Werts 1-yard rush, Alex Raynor kick
  Drive: 2 plays, 1 yard, 0:45; Georgia Southern 7–0
- (06:45) GASO TD – Derrick Canteen 22-yard fumble return, Alex Raynor kick
  Drive: 0 plays, 0 yards, 0:00; Georgia Southern 14–0

Second Quarter

- (13:45) ARMY TD – Sandon McCoy 1-yard rush, Quinn Maretzki kick
  Drive: 15 plays, 75 yards, 8:00; Georgia Southern 14–7
- (09:24) GASO TD – Cam Brown 24-yard pass from Shai Werts, Alex Raynor kick
  Drive: 8 plays, 86 yards, 4:14; Georgia Southern 21–7

Third Quarter

- (08:22) ARMY TD – Braheam Murphy 12-yard rush, Quinn Maretzki kick
  Drive: 11 plays, 52 yards, 6:31; Georgia Southern 21–14
- (06:18) ARMY TD – Sandon McCoy 2-yard rush, Quinn Maretzki kick
  Drive: 1 play, 2 yards, 0:04; Tied 21–21
- (04:17) GASO TD – Logan Wright 39-yard pass from Shai Werts, Alex Raynor kick blocked
  Drive: 4 plays, 75 yards, 2:01; Georgia Southern 27–21

Fourth Quarter

- (08:16) ARMY TD – Jakobi Buchanan 2-yard rush, Quinn Maretzki kick
  Drive: 18 plays, 71 yards, 10:50; Army 28–27

Passing

- GASO – Shai Werts: 6/7, 80 yards, 2 TD
- ARMY – Tyhier Tyler: 1/1, 25 yards

Rushing

- GASO – Wesley Kennedy III: 8 carries, 71 yards
- ARMY – Tyhier Tyler: 35 carries, 121 yards

Receiving

- GASO – Malik Murray: 3 receptions, 41 yards
- ARMY – Chris Cameron: 1 reception, 25 yards

Defense

- GASO – Reynard Ellis: 18 total tackles (3 solo, 15 assisted), 1 tackle for loss
- ARMY – Cedrick Cunningham Jr.: 12 total tackles (6 solo, 6 assisted), 2 tackles for loss

Statistics	GASO	ARMY
First downs	12	20
3rd down efficiency	4–9	9–18
4th down efficiency	0–1	4–4
Plays–yards	45–311	74–268
Rushes–yards	32–175	73–243
Passing yards	136	25
Passing: Comp–Att–Int	9–13–1	1–1–0
Penalties–yards	3–15	5–54
Turnovers	1	3
Time of possession	21:36	38:24

=== Navy ===
Navy Midshipmen at Army Black Knights (121st Army-Navy Game)

Quarter	1	2	3	4	Total
Midshipmen	0	0	0	0	0
Black Knights	0	3	0	12	15

at Michie Stadium, West Point, NY

- Date: December 12, 2020
- Game time: 3:00 p.m. EST
- Game weather: Temperature: 43 °F (6 °C) • Wind: Calm • Weather: Dense Fog
- Game attendance: 12,722
- Referee: Duane Heydt
- TV announcers (CBS): Brad Nessler (play-by-play), Gary Danielson (analyst) & Jamie Erdahl (sideline)
- ESPN – Army beats Navy 15–0 at Michie Stadium /// Box Score, Navy at Army (121st Army–Navy Game) /// Army Pregame Notes /// Navy Pregame Notes /// Postgame Notes

Game information

1st quarter

No scoring

2nd quarter

- (12:41) ARMY FG: Quinn Maretzki 37-yard field goal
  Drive: 6 plays, 28 yards, 3:28; Army 3–0

3rd quarter

No scoring

4th quarter

- (11:02) ARMY TD: Tyhier Tyler 4-yard rush, Quinn Maretzki kick
  Drive: 5 plays, 13 yards, 3:02; Army 10–0
- (05:21) ARMY SF: Daryan McDonald 14-yard safety
  Drive: 0 plays, 0 yards, 0:00; Army 12–0
- (02:20) ARMY FG: Quinn Maretzki 40-yard field goal
  Drive: 6 plays, -1 yards, 3:01; Army 15–0

Passing

- NAVY – Dalen Morris: 1/3, 9 yards
- ARMY – Tyhier Tyler: 1/1, 28 yards

Rushing

- NAVY – Xavier Arline: 17 carries, 109 yards
- ARMY – Tyhier Tyler: 26 carries, 96 yards, 1 TD

Receiving

- NAVY – Mark Walker: 1 reception, 9 yards
- ARMY – Tyrell Robinson: 1 reception, 28 yards

Defense

- NAVY – J'arius Warren: 14 total tackles (6 solo, 8 assisted), 2 tackles for loss
- ARMY – Arik Smith: 9 total tackles (5 solo, 4 assisted), 2 tackles for loss
  Amadeo West: 9 total tackles (4 solo, 5 assisted), 1 tackle for loss

Statistics	NAVY	ARMY
First downs	4	8
3rd down efficiency	1–11	4–14
4th down efficiency	0–2	0–0
Plays–yards	42–117	54–162
Rushes–yards	35–108	53–134
Passing yards	9	28
Passing: Comp–Att–Int	1–7–0	1–1–0
Penalties–yards	6–53	4–20
Turnovers	1	0
Time of possession	24:44	35:16

=== Air Force ===
Air Force Falcons at Army Black Knights

Quarter	1	2	3	4	Total
Falcons	0	0	7	0	7
Black Knights	0	3	0	7	10

at Michie Stadium, West Point, NY

- Date: December 19, 2020
- Game time: 3:00 p.m. EST
- Game weather: 27 °F (−3 °C)
- Game attendance: 1,306
- Referee: Brad Van Vark
- TV announcers (CBSSN): Dave Ryan (play-by-play), Ross Tucker (analyst) & Tina Cervasio (sideline)
- ESPN – Army beats Air Force 10–7, wins Commander-in-Chief's Trophy /// Box Score, Air Force at Army /// Pregame Notes /// Postgame Notes

Game information

First Quarter

no scoring

Second Quarter

- (11:23) ARMY FG: Quinn Maretzki 24-yard field goal
  Drive: 20 plays, 73 yards, 10:02; Army 3–0

Third Quarter

- (00:15) AF TD: Kyle Patterson 10-yard pass from Haaziq Daniels, Anthony Rodriguez kick
  Drive: 10 plays, 87 yards, 5:01; Air Force 7–3

Fourth Quarter

- (01:13) ARMY TD: Jakobi Buchanan 1-yard rush, Quinn Maretzki kick
  Drive: 16 plays, 80 yards, 7:11; Army 10–7

Passing

- AF – Haaziq Daniels: 6/14, 107 yards, 1 TD, 3 INT
- ARMY – Christian Anderson: 1/1, 0 yards

Rushing

- AF – Brad Roberts: 11 carries, 83 yards
- ARMY – Jakobi Buchanan: 21 carries, 86 yards, 1 TD

Receiving

- AF – Kyle Patterson: 3 receptions, 65 yards, 1 TD
- ARMY – Tyrell Robinson: 1 reception, 0 yards

Defense

- AF – Will Trawick: 14 total tackles (2 solo, 12 assisted), 0.5 tackles for loss, 1 fumble recovery
- ARMY – Jon Rhattigan: 7 total tackles (4 solo, 3 assisted)

Statistics	AF	ARMY
First downs	11	21
3rd down efficiency	4–8	9–17
4th down efficiency	0–0	2–3
Plays–yards	40–261	73–290
Rushes–yards	26–154	71–290
Passing yards	107	0
Passing: Comp–Att–Int	6–14–3	1–2–0
Penalties–yards	3–15	2–15
Turnovers	3	1
Time of possession	22:34	37:26

=== Vs. West Virginia – Liberty Bowl ===
West Virginia Mountaineers vs. Army Black Knights (2020 AutoZone Liberty Bowl)

Quarter	1	2	3	4	Total
Mountaineers	3	7	6	8	24
Black Knights	0	14	7	0	21

at Liberty Bowl Memorial Stadium, Memphis, TN

- Date: December 31, 2020
- Game time: 3:00 p.m. CST
- Game weather: Temperature: 40 °F (4 °C) • Wind: NE 12 mph • Weather: Rain
- Game attendance: 8,187
- Referee: Stuart Mullins
- TV announcers (ESPN): Wes Durham (play-by-play), Roddy Jones (analyst) & Eric Wood (sideline)
- ESPN – West Virginia Mountaineers vs. Army Black Knights (2020 AutoZone Liberty Bowl) /// Box Score, West Virginia vs. Army (2020 AutoZone Liberty Bowl) /// Pregame Notes /// Postgame Notes

Game information

First Quarter

- (01:47) WVU FG: Tyler Sumpter 31-yard field goal
  Drive: 7 plays, 48 yards, 2:33; West Virginia 3–0

Second Quarter

- (09:31) ARMY TD: Tyhier Tyler 1-yard rush, Quinn Maretzki kick
  Drive: 14 plays, 74 yards, 7:12; Army 7–3
- (04:21) WVU TD: T.J. Simmons 5-yard pass from Jarret Doege, Tyler Sumpter kick
  Drive: 12 plays, 77 yards, 5:04; West Virginia 10–7
- (01:14) ARMY TD: Tyhier Tyler 6-yard rush, Quinn Maretzki kick
  Drive: 2 plays, 7 yards, 0:38; Army 14–10

Third Quarter

- (07:00) ARMY TD: Tyhier Tyler 2-yard rush, Quinn Maretzki kick
  Drive: 13 plays, 75 yards, 8:00; Army 21–10
- (03:23) WVU TD: Mike O'Laughlin 3-yard pass from Austin Kendall, Austin Kendall pass failed
  Drive: 10 plays, 80 yards, 3:32; Army 21–16

Fourth Quarter

- (05:10) WVU TD: T.J. Simmons 20-yard pass from Austin Kendall, Reese Smith rush
  Drive: 8 plays, 65 yards, 3:11; West Virginia 24–21

Passing

- WVU – Jarret Doege: 15/25, 159 yards, 1 TD, 1 INT
- ARMY – Christian Anderson: 4/6, 57 yards, 1 INT

Rushing

- WVU – Leddie Brown: 20 carries, 65 yards
- ARMY – Tyhier Tyler: 24 carries, 76 yards, 3 TD

Receiving

- WVU – T.J. Simmons: 4 receptions, 56 yards, 2 TD
- ARMY – Chris Cameron: 1 reception, 32 yards

Defense

- WVU – Josh Chandler: 13 total tackles (10 solo, 3 assisted), 1 tackle for loss, 1 forced fumble, 1 interception
- ARMY – Arik Smith: 7 total tackles (5 solo, 2 assisted)

Statistics	WVU	ARMY
First downs	19	16
3rd down efficiency	8–16	5–13
4th down efficiency	1–1	1–3
Plays–yards	69–322	65–239
Rushes–yards	27–42	59–182
Passing yards	280	57
Passing: Comp–Att–Int	23–42–1	4–6–1
Penalties–yards	7–53	3–30
Turnovers	2	1
Time of possession	26:19	33:41
