= 2020 West Virginia Mountaineers football team =

American college football season

2020 West Virginia Mountaineers football

Liberty Bowl champion

Liberty Bowl, W 24–21 vs. Army
- Conference: Big 12 Conference
- Record: 6–4 (4–4 Big 12)
- Head coach: Neal Brown (2nd season)
- Offensive coordinator: Gerad Parker (1st season)
- Co-offensive coordinator: Chad Scott (2nd season)
- Offensive scheme: Multiple
- Defensive coordinator: Jordan Lesley (1st season)
- Co-defensive coordinators: Jahmile Addae (1st season); Jeff Koonz (1st season)
- Base defense: Multiple
- Home stadium: Mountaineer Field at Milan Puskar Stadium

2020 Big 12 Conference football standings
	Conf.			Overall
Team	W		L	W		L
No. 9 Iowa State y	8	–	1	9	–	3
No. 6 Oklahoma y$	6	–	2	9	–	2
No. 20 Oklahoma State	6	–	3	8	–	3
No. 19 Texas	5	–	3	7	–	3
TCU	5	–	4	6	–	4
West Virginia	4	–	4	6	–	4
Kansas State	4	–	5	4	–	6
Texas Tech	3	–	6	4	–	6
Baylor	2	–	7	2	–	7
Kansas	0	–	8	0	–	9
Championship: Oklahoma 27, Iowa State 21
$ – Conference champion; y – Championship game participant; Rankings from AP Poll.

The 2020 West Virginia Mountaineers football team represented West Virginia University during the 2020 NCAA Division I FBS football season. The Mountaineers played their home games at the Mountaineer Field at Milan Puskar Stadium, in Morgantown, West Virginia, and competed in the Big 12 Conference. They were led by second-year head coach Neal Brown.

== Offseason ==
=== Coaching changes ===
Offensive coordinator Matt Moore was promoted to assistant head coach, and was replaced in his role as offensive coordinator by Penn State wide receivers coach Gerad Parker. Parker also replaced Xavier Dye, who departed for South Florida, as wide receivers coach. Additionally, the Mountaineers hired Jeff Koonz from Ole Miss to serve as inside linebackers and special team coach and later became co-defensive coordinator.

On July 22, Defensive coordinator Vic Koenning parted ways with West Virginia after allegations of mistreatment by West Virginia players. To replace him, they promoted three defensive coaches to become co-defensive coordinators: Jordan Lesley, Jahmile Addae, and Jeff Koonz. They also moved linebackers coach Dontae Wright to safeties coach along with promoting analyst Jeff Casteel to outside linebackers coach.

== Preseason ==
=== Big 12 media days ===
The Big 12 media days were held on July 21–22, 2020 in a virtual format due to the COVID-19 pandemic.

=== Big 12 media poll ===
Big 12 media poll
Predicted finish	Team	Votes (1st place)
1	Oklahoma	888 (88)
2	Oklahoma State	742 (6)
3	Texas	727 (4)
4	Iowa State	607
5	Baylor	489
6	TCU	477
7	Kansas State	366
8	West Virginia	287
9	Texas Tech	267
10	Kansas	100

== Schedule ==
=== Spring game ===
The West Virginia football spring "Blue-Gold game" was canceled due to COVID-19.

=== Regular season ===
West Virginia released its 2020 schedule on October 21, 2019. The 2020 schedule originally consisted of 7 home games, 4 away games, and 1 neutral-site game in the regular season. The Mountaineers were to host two non-conference games against Eastern Kentucky and Maryland, and play a non-conference neutral site game against Florida State in the Chick-fil-A Kickoff Game in Mercedes-Benz Stadium in Atlanta. West Virginia was to host Kansas State, TCU, Kansas, Oklahoma, and Baylor; and travel to Texas Tech, Texas, Oklahoma State, and Iowa State in regular-season conference play.

The Mountaineers' games against Florida State, scheduled for September 5, and Maryland, scheduled for September 19, were canceled due to the COVID-19 pandemic.

Date	Time	Opponent	Site	TV	Result	Attendance
September 12	12:00 p.m.	Eastern Kentucky*	Milan Puskar Stadium; Morgantown, WV	FS1	W 56–10	976
September 26	3:30 p.m.	at No. 15 Oklahoma State	Boone Pickens Stadium; Stillwater, OK	ABC	L 13–27	14,672
October 3	12:00 p.m.	Baylor	Milan Puskar Stadium; Morgantown, WV	ABC	W 27–21 ^{2OT}	978
October 17	12:00 p.m.	Kansas	Milan Puskar Stadium; Morgantown, WV	FOX	W 38–17	10,759
October 24	5:30 p.m.	at Texas Tech	Jones AT&T Stadium; Lubbock, TX	ESPN2	L 27–34	13,532
October 31	12:00 p.m.	No. 16 Kansas State^{†}	Milan Puskar Stadium; Morgantown, WV	ESPN2	W 37–10	10,441
November 7	12:00 p.m.	at No. 22 Texas	Darrell K Royal–Texas Memorial Stadium; Austin, TX	ABC	L 13–17	17,843
November 14	12:00 p.m.	TCU	Milan Puskar Stadium; Morgantown, WV	FOX	W 24–6	11,111
December 5	3:30 p.m.	at No. 9 Iowa State	Jack Trice Stadium; Ames, IA	ESPN	L 6–42	14,256
December 31	4:00 p.m.	vs. Army	Liberty Bowl Memorial Stadium; Memphis, TN (Liberty Bowl)	ESPN	W 24–21	8,187
*Non-conference game; ^{†}Homecoming; Rankings from AP Poll and CFP Rankings (after November 24) released prior to game; All times are in Eastern time

Schedule source:

== Coaching staff ==
Coach	Title	Year at West Virginia	Previous job
Neal Brown	Head Coach	2nd	Troy
Matt Moore	Assistant Head Coach/OL	2nd	Troy Co-OC/OL
Gerad Parker	OC/WR	1st	Penn State (WR/PGC)
Chad Scott	Co-OC/RB	2nd	Louisville (RB)
Jeff Koonz	ILB/ST	1st	Ole Miss (ILB)
Jahmile Addae	DB	2nd	Minnesota (DB)
Jeff Casteel	Defensive Analyst/OLB	1st	Nevada (DC/LB)
Jordan Lesley	DL	2nd	Troy (DL)
Seth Reagan	QB	2nd	Troy (Co-OC/QB)
Travis Trickett	TE/WR	2nd	Georgia State (OC/QB)
Dontae Wright	S	1st	Western Michigan (S)

== Game summaries ==
=== Vs. Eastern Kentucky ===
Eastern Kentucky Colonels (0–1) vs. West Virginia Mountaineers (0–0)

Quarter	1	2	3	4	Total
Eastern Kentucky	0	7	3	0	10
West Virginia	14	28	7	7	56

at Milan Puskar Stadium • Morgantown, WV

- Date: Saturday, September 12, 2020
- Game time: 12:00 p.m. EDT
- Game weather: mostly cloudy, 88°F
- TV: FS1

Game information

First quarter

Second quarter

Third quarter

Fourth quarter

Statistics	EKU	WVU
First downs	9	31
Total yards	206	624
Rushes/yards	75	329
Passing yards	131	295
Passing: Comp–Att–Int	9-17-1	25-35-0
Time of possession	24:17	35:43

Team	Category	Player	Statistics
Eastern Kentucky	Passing	Peyton McKinney	9-17, 131 yds, 1 TD, 1 INT
Eastern Kentucky	Rushing	Alonzo Booth	7 carries, 45 yds
Eastern Kentucky	Receiving	Keyion Dixon	3 receptions, 53 yds, 1 TD
West Virginia	Passing	Jarret Doege	19–25, 228 yds, 3 TD
West Virginia	Rushing	Alec Sinkfield	15 carries, 123 yds, 2 TD
West Virginia	Receiving	Sam James	5 receptions, 72 yds, 1 TD

=== At Oklahoma State ===
West Virginia Mountaineers (1–0) vs. No. 15 Oklahoma State Cowboys (1–0)

Quarter	1	2	3	4	Total
West Virginia	0	7	3	3	13
No. 15 Oklahoma State	0	20	0	7	27

at Boone Pickens Stadium • Stillwater, OK

- Date: Saturday, September 26, 2020
- Game time: 3:30 p.m. EST
- Game weather: •Sunny Temperature: 87
- Game attendance: 14,672
- Referee: David Alvarez
- TV announcers (ABC): Bob Wischusen (play-by-play), Dan Orlovsky (analyst), Kris Budden (sideline)

Game information

First Quarter

None

Second Quarter

- (13:43) OKST – LD Brown 66-yard run, Alex Hale kick (Drive: 3 plays, 76 yards, 1:04; Oklahoma State 7–0)
- (11:07) OKST – Tyren Irby 56-yard fumble return, Alex Hale kick (Drive: 8 plays, 31 yards, 2:36; Oklahoma State 14–0)
- (5:02) OKST – Alex Hale 40-yard field goal (Drive: 7 plays, 48 yards, 2:22; Oklahoma State 17–0)
- (3:48) WVU – Winston Wright Jr. 70-yard pass from Jarret Doege, Evan Staley kick (Drive: 3 plays, 75 yards, 1:14; Oklahoma State 17–7)
- (0:03) OKST – Alex Hale 40-yard field goal (Drive: 8 plays, 40 yards, 0:56; Oklahoma State 20–7)

Third Quarter

- (0:37) WVU – Evan Staley 26-yard field goal (Drive: 6 plays, 32 yards, 2:12; Oklahoma State 20–10)

Fourth Quarter

- (9:01) WVU – Evan Staley 30-yard field goal (Drive: 11 plays, 57 yards, 4:40; Oklahoma State 20–13)
- (1:17) OKST – Chuba Hubbard 23-yard run, Alex Hale kick (Drive: 15 plays, 80 yards, 7:44; Oklahoma State 27–13)

Statistics	WVU	OKST
First downs	22	20
Total yards	353	342
Rushes/yards	42–68	41–203
Passing yards	285	139
Passing: Comp–Att–Int	20–37–0	15–22–1
Time of possession	32:51	27:09

Team	Category	Player	Statistics
West Virginia	Passing	Jarret Doege	20/37, 285 yards, TD
West Virginia	Rushing	Leddie Brown	26 carries, 104 yards
West Virginia	Receiving	Winston Wright Jr.	6 receptions, 127 yards, TD
Oklahoma State	Passing	Shane Illingworth	15/21, 139 yards, INT
Oklahoma State	Rushing	LD Brown	11 carries, 103 yards, TD
Oklahoma State	Receiving	Tylan Wallace	6 receptions, 78 yards

=== Vs. Baylor ===
Baylor Bears (1–0) vs. West Virginia Mountaineers (1–1)

Quarter	1	2	3	4	OT	Total
Baylor	0	7	0	7	7	21
West Virginia	7	0	7	0	13	27

at Milan Puskar Stadium • Morgantown, WV

- Date: Saturday, October 3, 2020
- Game time: 12:00 p.m. EST
- Game weather: partly cloudy • Temperature: 57°F
- Game attendance: 978
- Referee: Scott Campbell
- TV announcers (ABC): Bob Wischusen, Dan Orlovsky and Rocky Boiman

Game information

First Quarter

- (8:51) WVU – Jarret Doege 1 yard rush, Evan Stanley kick (Drive: 15 plays, 70 yards, 6:09; WVU 7–0)

Second Quarter

- (6:44) BAY – Charlie Brewer 7 yard pass to R.J. Sneed, John Mayers kick (Drive: 5 plays, 30 yards, 2:43 7–7)

Third Quarter

- (1:38) WVU – Leddie Brown 1 yard rush, Evan Stanley kick (Drive: 11 plays, 72 yards, 5:05, WVU 14–7)

Fourth Quarter

- (1:19) BAY – Charlie Brewer 34 yard pass to Josh Fleeks, John Mayers kick (Drive: 4 plays, 59 yards, 0:36, 14–14)

Overtime

- (OT) WVU – Jarret Doege 6 yard pass to Bryce Ford-Wheaton, Evan Stanley kick (Drive: 5 plays, 25 yards, WVU 21–14)
- (OT) BAY – Charlie Brewer 25 yard pass to Ben Sims, John Mayers kick (Drive: 1 play, 25 yards, 21–21)
- (2OT) WVU – Leddie Brown 3 yard rush (Drive: 4 plays, 25 yards, WVU 27–21)

Statistics	BAY	WVU
First downs	15	18
Total yards	256	345
Rushes/yards	33/27	39/134
Passing yards	229	211
Passing: Comp–Att–Int	23–38–2	30–42–2
Time of possession	28:07	31:53

Team	Category	Player	Statistics
Baylor	Passing	Charlie Brewer	23–38, 229 yards, 3 TD, 2 INT
Baylor	Rushing	John Lovett	14 carries, 23 yards
Baylor	Receiving	R.J. Sneed	6 receptions, 48 yards, 1 TD
West Virginia	Passing	Jarret Doege	30–42, 211 yards, 1 TD, 2 INT
West Virginia	Rushing	Leddie Brown	27 carries, 93 yards, 2 TD
West Virginia	Receiving	Sam James	8 reception, 66 yards

=== Vs. Kansas ===
Kansas Jayhawks (0–3) vs. West Virginia Mountaineers (2–1)

Quarter	1	2	3	4	Total
Kansas	10	0	0	7	17
West Virginia	7	10	7	14	38

at Milan Puskar Stadium • Morgantown, WV

- Date: Saturday, October 17, 2020
- Game time: 12:00 p.m. EDT
- Game weather: Sunny • Temperature: 53 °F (12 °C) • Wind: SW 6 miles per hour (9.7 km/h)
- Game attendance: 10,759
- Referee: Michael Vandervelde
- TV announcers (FOX): Gus Johnson (play-by-play) and Joel Klatt (analyst)

Game information

First Quarter

- (11:41) KU – Jacob Borcila 41-yard field goal (Drive: 7 plays, 18 yards, 2:24; Kansas 3–0)
- (9:21) KU – Andrew Parchment 43-yard pass from Miles Kendrick, Jacob Borcila kick (Drive: 2 plays, 45 yards, 0:32; Kansas 10–0)
- (4:53) WVU – Bryce Ford-Wheaton 33-yard pass from Jarret Doege, Evan Staley kick (Drive: 3 plays, 50 yards, 1:00; Kansas 10–7)

Second Quarter

- (3:25) WVU – Leddie Brown 6-yard pass from Jarret Doege, Evan Stanley kick (Drive: 10 plays, 91 yards, 3:41; West Virginia 14–10)
- (0:16) WVU – Evan Staley 33-yard field goal (Drive: 8 plays, 53 yards, 0:49; West Virginia 17–10)

Third Quarter

- (3:37) WVU – Leddie Brown 87-yard run, Evan Staley kick (Drive: 3 plays, 96 yards, 0:48; West Virginia 24–10)

Fourth Quarter

- (14:55) WVU – Sam James 8-yard pass from Jarret Doege, Evan Staley kick (Drive: 4 plays, 48 yards, 1:34; West Virginia 31–10)
- (2:00) WVU – Alec Sinkfield 3-yard run, Evan Staley kick (Drive: 9 plays, 65 yards, 5:38; West Virginia 38–10)
- (1:45) KU – Pooka Williams 92-yard kickoff return, Jacob Borcila kick (West Virginia 38–17)

Statistics	KAN	WVU
First downs	7	29
Total yards	157	544
Rushes/yards	31/62	38/226
Passing yards	95	318
Passing: Comp–Att–Int	14–23–2	26–44–1
Time of possession	27:05	32:55

Team	Category	Player	Statistics
Kansas	Passing	Miles Kendrick	14/23, 95 yards, TD, 2 INT
Kansas	Rushing	Velton Gardner	11 carries, 43 yards
Kansas	Receiving	Andrew Parchment	6 receptions, 65 yards, TD
West Virginia	Passing	Jarret Doege	26/44, 318 yards, 3 TD, INT
West Virginia	Rushing	Leddie Brown	18 carries, 195 yards, TD
West Virginia	Receiving	Bryce Ford-Wheaton	5 receptions, 89 yards, TD

=== At Texas Tech ===
West Virginia Mountaineers (3–1) vs. Texas Tech Red Raiders (1–3)

Quarter	1	2	3	4	Total
West Virginia	7	6	14	0	27
Texas Tech	13	7	7	7	34

at Jones AT&T Stadium • Lubbock, TX

- Date: Saturday, October 24, 2020
- Game time: 5:30 p.m. EDT
- Game weather: Temperature: 65 °F (18 °C) • weather: clear • wind: SSW 17 MPH
- Game attendance: 13,532
- Referee: Brandon Cruse
- TV announcers (ESPN2): Anish Shroff, Tom Luginbill and Ian Fitzsimmons

Game information

First quarter

- TTU – Henry Colombi 1-yard run (Trey Wolff kick), 9:29. Red Raiders 7–0. Drive: 10 plays, 69 yards, 4:08.
- WVU – Leddie Brown 3-yard run (Evan Staley kick), 7:41. Tied 7–7. Drive: 5 plays, 75 yards, 1:46.
- TTU – SaRodorick Thompson 48-yard run (kick failed), 1:35. Red Raiders 13–7. Drive: 3 plays, 61 yards, 1:11.

Second quarter

- WVU – Evan Staley 41-yard field goal, 9:00. Red Raiders 13–10. Drive: 7 plays, 42 yards, 3:02.
- TTU – Trey Cleveland 11-yard pass from Henry Colombi (Trey Wolff kick), 2:36. Red Raiders 20–10. Drive: 13 plays, 75 yards, 6:24.
- WVU – Evan Staley 45-yard field goal, 0:00. Red Raiders 20–13. Drive: 12 plays, 47 yards, 2:36.

Third quarter

- WVU – T.J. Banks 2-yard pass from Jarret Doege (Evan Staley kick), 13:41. Tied 20–20. Drive: 3 plays, 24 yards, 1:07.
- TTU – Tahj Brooks 5-yard run (Trey Wolff kick), 10:05. Red Raiders 27–20. Drive: 9 plays, 73 yards, 3:36.
- WVU – Leddie Brown 1-yard run (Evan Staley kick), 6:00. Tied 27–27. Drive: 10 plays, 65 yards, 4:05.

Fourth quarter

- TTU – Zech McPhearson 56-yard fumble return (Trey Wolff kick), 8:44. Red Raiders 34–27.

Statistics	WVU	TTU
First downs	22	18
Total yards	438	348
Rushes/yards	29/91	39/179
Passing yards	347	169
Passing: Comp–Att–Int	32–50–0	22–28–0
Time of possession	30:07	29:53

Team	Category	Player	Statistics
West Virginia	Passing	Jarret Doege	32/50, 347 yards, TD
West Virginia	Rushing	Leddie Brown	21 rushes, 77 yards, 2 TD
West Virginia	Receiving	Winston Wright Jr.	9 receptions, 126 yards
Texas Tech	Passing	Henry Colombi	22/28, 169 yards, TD
Texas Tech	Rushing	SaRodorick Thompson	8 rushes, 68 yards, TD
Texas Tech	Receiving	Myles Price	7 receptions, 79 yards

=== Vs. No. 16 Kansas State (homecoming) ===
No. 16 Kansas State Wildcats (4–1) vs. West Virginia Mountaineers (3–2)

Quarter	1	2	3	4	Total
No. 16 Kansas State	0	0	0	0	0
West Virginia	0	0	0	0	0

at Milan Puskar Stadium • Morgantown, WV

- Date: Saturday, October 31, 2020
- Game time: 12:00 p.m. EDT
- Game weather: • Temperature:
- Game attendance: 10,441
- TV: ESPN2

Game information

First Quarter

Second Quarter

Third Quarter

Fourth Quarter

Statistics	KSU	WVU
First downs		
Total yards		
Rushes/yards		
Passing yards		
Passing: Comp–Att–Int		
Time of possession		

Team	Category	Player	Statistics
Kansas State	Passing		
Kansas State	Rushing		
Kansas State	Receiving		
West Virginia	Passing		
West Virginia	Rushing		
West Virginia	Receiving		

=== At Texas ===
West Virginia Mountaineers (4–2) vs. Texas Longhorns (4–2)

Quarter	1	2	3	4	Total
West Virginia	7	0	6	0	13
No. 22 Texas	7	3	7	0	17

at Darrell K Royal–Texas Memorial Stadium • Austin, TX

- Date: Saturday, November 7, 2020
- Game time: 12:00 p.m. EDT
- Game weather: Mostly Sunny, 70 °F (21 °C), Wind: 0 mph (0 km/h)
- Game attendance: 17,843
- Referee: Kevin Hassell
- TV announcers (ABC): Joe Tessitore, Greg McElroy, Holly Rowe

Game information

First Quarter

- (12:35) UT – Brennan Eagles 7 yard pass from Sam Ehlinger (Dicker kick), UT 7–0; 7 plays, 75 yards, 2:25
- (8:58) WVU – Leddie Brown 12 yard run (Legg kick), Tied 7–7; 9 plays, 75 yards, 3:37

Second Quarter

- (14:55) UT – Cameron Dicker 34 yard field goal, UT 10–7; 10 plays, 74 yards, 2:24

Third Quarter

- (10:11) WVU – Casey Legg 25 yard field goal, Tied 10–10; 11 plays, 66 yards, 4:49
- (7:31) UT – Jake Smith 33 yard pass from Sam Ehlinger (Dicker kick), UT 17–10; 7 plays, 65 yards, 2:40
- (0:22) WVU – Casey Legg 34 yard field goal, UT 17–13; 9 plays, 31 yards, 4:20

Statistics	WVU	TEX
First Downs	21	17
Total Yards	360	363
Rushing: Att/Yds	26/43	36/9
Passing yards	317	184
Passing: Comp–Att–Int	35–50–0	15–31–0
Time of Possession	34:21	25:39

Team	Category	Player	Statistics
West Virginia	Passing	Jarret Doege	35–50, 317 yards
West Virginia	Rushing	Leddie Brown	15 car, 47 yards, 1 TD
West Virginia	Receiving	T.J. Simmons	4 rec, 71 yards
Texas	Passing	Sam Ehlinger	15–31, 184 yards, 2 TDs
Texas	Rushing	Bijan Robinson	12 car, 113 yards
Texas	Receiving	Jake Smith	3 rec, 59 yards, 1 TD

=== Vs. TCU ===
TCU Horned Frogs (3–3) vs. West Virginia Mountaineers (4–3)

Quarter	1	2	3	4	Total
TCU	0	0	0	0	0
West Virginia	0	0	0	0	0

at Milan Puskar Stadium • Morgantown, WV

- Date: Saturday, November 14, 2020
- Game time: 12:00 p.m. EDT
- Game weather: • Temperature:
- Game attendance: 11,111
- TV: FOX

Game information

First Quarter

Second Quarter

Third Quarter

Fourth Quarter

Statistics	TCU	WVU
First downs		
Total yards		
Rushes/yards		
Passing yards		
Passing: Comp–Att–Int		
Time of possession		

Team	Category	Player	Statistics
TCU	Passing		
TCU	Rushing		
TCU	Receiving		
West Virginia	Passing		
West Virginia	Rushing		
West Virginia	Receiving		

=== At Iowa State ===
West Virginia Mountaineers (5–3) vs. No. 9 Iowa State Cyclones (7–2)

Quarter	1	2	3	4	Total
West Virginia	0	0	0	6	6
No. 9 Iowa State	7	14	14	7	42

at Jack Trice Stadium • Ames, IA

- Date: Saturday, December 5, 2020
- Game time: 3:30 p.m. EST
- Game weather: Clear • Temperature: 49
- Game attendance: 14,256
- Referee: Kevin Hassell
- TV announcers (ESPN): Dave Pasch, Mike Golic

Game information

First Quarter

- (5:51) ISU – Breece Hall 23 Yd Run (Connor Assalley Kick) (10 plays, 80 yards, 4:49; ISU 7–0)

Second Quarter

- (14:17) ISU – Brock Purdy 10 Yd Run (Connor Assalley Kick) (11 plays, 44 yards, 4:31; ISU 14–0)
- (2:49) ISU – Landen Akers 2 Yd pass from Brock Purdy (Connor Assalley Kick (12 plays, 76 yards, 5:07; ISU 21–0)

Third Quarter

- (3:10) ISU – Charlie Kolar 16 Yd pass from Brock Purdy (Connor Assalley Kick) (5 plays, 73 yards, 1:40; ISU 28–0)
- (0:07) ISU – Kene Nwangwu 47 Yd Run (Connor Assalley Kick (4 plays, 78 yards, 1:51; ISU 35–0)

Fourth Quarter

- (12:00) WVU – Tyler Sumpter 32 Yd Field Goal (8 plays, 67 yards, 3:07; ISU 35–3)
- (7:07) ISU – Breece Hall 28 Yd pass from Brock Purdy (Connor Assalley Kick) (9 plays, 73 yards, 4:53; ISU 42–3)
- (2:46) WVU – Tyler Sumpter 32 Yd Field Goal (13 plays, 49 yards, 4:21; ISU 42–6)

Statistics	WVU	ISU
First downs	16	26
Total yards	263	483
Rushes/yards	25-54	44-236
Passing yards	209	247
Passing: Comp–Att–Int	21-41-0	20-23-0
Time of possession	28:09	31:51

Team	Category	Player	Statistics
West Virginia	Passing	Jarret Doege	21–44, 209 YDS
West Virginia	Rushing	Leddie Brown	14 CAR, 48 YDS
West Virginia	Receiving	Sean Ryan	5 REC, 79 YDS
Iowa State	Passing	Brock Purdy	20–23, 247 YDS, 3 TD
Iowa State	Rushing	Breece Hall	22 CAR, 97 YDS, TD
Iowa State	Receiving	Xavier Hutchinson	8 REC, 89 YDS

=== Vs. Army – Liberty Bowl ===
West Virginia Mountaineers (5–4) vs. Army Black Knights (9–2) (2020 AutoZone Liberty Bowl)

Quarter	1	2	3	4	Total
West Virginia	3	7	6	8	24
Army	0	14	7	0	21

at Liberty Bowl Memorial Stadium • Memphis, TN

- Date: Thursday, December 31, 2020
- Game time: 4:00 p.m. EST
- Game weather: Temperature: 40 °F (4 °C) • Wind: NE 12 mph • Weather: Rain
- Game attendance: 8.187
- Referee: Stuart Mullins
- TV announcers (ESPN): Wes Durham (play-by-play), Roddy Jones (analyst) & Eric Wood (sideline)
- ESPN – West Virginia Mountaineers vs. Army Black Knights (2020 AutoZone Liberty Bowl)

Game information

First Quarter

- (01:47) WVU FG: Tyler Sumpter 31-yard field goal
  Drive: 7 plays, 48 yards, 2:33; West Virginia 3–0

Second Quarter

- (09:31) ARMY TD: Tyhier Tyler 1-yard rush, Quinn Maretzki kick
  Drive: 14 plays, 74 yards, 7:12; Army 7–3
- (04:21) WVU TD: T.J. Simmons 5-yard pass from Jarret Doege, Tyler Sumpter kick
  Drive: 12 plays, 77 yards, 5:04; West Virginia 10–7
- (01:14) ARMY TD: Tyhier Tyler 6-yard rush, Quinn Maretzki kick
  Drive: 2 plays, 7 yards, 0:38; Army 14–10

Third Quarter

- (07:00) ARMY TD: Tyhier Tyler 2-yard rush, Quinn Maretzki kick
  Drive: 13 plays, 75 yards, 8:00; Army 21–10
- (03:23) WVU TD: Mike O'Laughlin 3-yard pass from Austin Kendall, Austin Kendall pass failed
  Drive: 10 plays, 80 yards, 3:32; Army 21–16

Fourth Quarter

- (05:10) WVU TD: T.J. Simmons 20-yard pass from Austin Kendall, Reese Smith rush
  Drive: 8 plays, 65 yards, 3:11; West Virginia 24–21

Statistics	WVU	ARMY
First downs	19	16
Total yards	322	239
Rushes/yards	27–42	59–182
Passing yards	280	57
Passing: Comp–Att–Int	23–42–1	4–6–1
Time of possession	26:19	33:41

Team	Category	Player	Statistics
West Virginia	Passing	Jarrett Doege	15/25, 159 yards, 1 TD, 1 INT
West Virginia	Rushing	Leddie Brown	20 carries, 65 yards
West Virginia	Receiving	T.J. Simmons	4 receptions, 56 yards, 2 TD
Army	Passing	Christian Anderson	4/6, 57 yards, 1 INT
Army	Rushing	Tyhier Tyler	24 carries, 76 yards, 3 TD
Army	Receiving	Chris Cameron	1 reception, 32 yards

== Rankings ==
Ranking movements Legend: ██ Increase in ranking ██ Decrease in ranking — = Not ranked RV = Received votes
	Week															
Poll	Pre	1	2	3	4	5	6	7	8	9	10	11	12	13	14	Final
AP	—	—	—	RV	RV	—	RV	RV	RV	—	RV	—				
Coaches	—	—	—	RV	RV	—	RV	RV	RV	RV	RV	—				
CFP	Not released															Not released

== Players drafted into the NFL ==
Round	Pick	Player	Position	NFL Club
5	153	Tony Fields II	ILB	Cleveland Browns
