= Paisley Magnet School =

American school in North Carolina

Coordinates: 36°06′50″N 80°15′36″W

Paisley Magnet School cafeteria entrance in 2007

John W. Paisley Magnet School is a Middle school/High school located in Winston-Salem, North Carolina. It is home to the International Baccalaureate Middle Years program for students in grades six through ten. Paisley is a part of the Winston-Salem/Forsyth County Schools system. In 2007, Paisley was recognized as a Magnet School of excellence; one of five in North Carolina and only fifty in the United States. Paisley has been an accredited IB/MYP school since 2004. Marion Pittman-Couch was principal during Paisley's process to become recognized by the IBO and retired in 2007. Paisley Magnet School is currently searching for a new principal. Paisley houses more than 800 students from Forsyth County and the region. Students must complete a magnet school application for admission to Paisley if they are not a resident in Paisley's home school zone. The eleventh and twelfth grade IB Diploma Programme is housed at Parkland High School. The IB Primary Years Programme begins at Speas Elementary School for grades K–5.

== Academics, student life ==
Paisley offers several robotics and technology courses provided under a special grant awarded to the school. Paisley also has NASA-trained staff. Ray Alford teaches four robotics courses: 6th grade Robotics, 7th grade Robotics and Technology, 8th grade Exploring Robotics and Technology, and 9th/10th grade Fundamentals of Technology. The robotics courses often enter competitions and have had much success in recent years.

== Travel abroad trips ==
To complement the rigorous international focus of the IB Middle Years Programme, the school has organized an international trip abroad annually for several years. IB Coordinator Don Lail is the lead organizer of these trips, which are put together by EF Tours, and are not technically a "school-sanctioned" event. Eighth, ninth, and tenth grade students at Paisley are invited to travel.
