= Winston-Salem/Forsyth County Schools =

School district in Forsyth County, North Carolina

Location
- Forsyth County, North Carolina United States

District information
- Type: Public school district
- Grades: PreK -12
- Established: 1963
- Superintendent: Dr. Don Phipps
- Budget: $576.3 million

Students and staff
- Students: 54,984
- Teachers: 4,200
- Staff: 7,200

Other information
- Website: www.wsfcs.k12.nc.us

Winston-Salem/Forsyth County Schools (WS/FCS) is a school district in Forsyth County, North Carolina. WS/FCS has over 80 schools in its system, and it serves 54,984 students every year. WS/FCS was formed in 1963 by the merger of the Forsyth County School System and the Winston-Salem School System. WS/FCS is now the fourth largest school system in North Carolina, and it is the 81st largest in the United States. WS/FCS is also the most diverse school district in North Carolina.

The district covers all of Forsyth County.

== Elementary schools ==
- Ashley Elementary
- Bolton Elementary
- Brunson Elementary
- Caleb's Creek Elementary
- Cash Elementary
- Clemmons Elementary
- Cook Literacy Model School
- Diggs-Latham Elementary
- Easton Elementary
- Forest Park Elementary
- Julian Gibson Elementary School
- Griffith Elementary
- Hall-Woodward Elementary
- Ibraham Elementary
- Jefferson Elementary
- Kernersville Elementary
- Kimberly Park Elementary
- Kimmel Farm Elementary
- Konnoak Elementary
- Lewisville Elementary
- Meadowlark Elementary
- Mineral Springs Elementary
- Moore Elementary
- Morgan Elementary
- North Hills Elementary
- Old Richmond Elementary
- Old Town Elementary
- Petree Elementary
- Piney Grove Elementary
- Rural Hall Elementary
- Sedge Garden Elementary
- Sherwood Forest Elementary
- Smith Farm Elementary
- South Fork Elementary
- Southwest Elementary
- Speas Elementary
- The Downtown
- Union Cross Elementary
- Vienna Elementary
- Walkertown Elementary
- Ward Elementary
- Whitaker Elementary

== Middle schools ==
- Clemmons Middle
- East Forsyth Middle
- Flat Rock Middle
- Hanes Magnet Middle
- Jacket Academy
- Jefferson Middle
- Kernersville Middle
- Konnoak Middle School
- Lewisville Middle
- Meadowlark Middle
- Mineral Springs Middle
- Northwest Middle
- Paisley IB Magnet
- Southeast Middle
- Walkertown Middle
- Wiley Magnet Middle
- Winston-Salem Prep Academy

== High schools ==
- Atkins Academic and Technology High
- Career Center
- Carver High
- Early College of Forsyth
- East Forsyth High
- Forsyth Middle College
- Glenn High
- John F. Kennedy High
- Mount Tabor High
- North Forsyth High
- Parkland High
- Reagan High
- Reynolds High
- Walkertown High
- West Forsyth High
- Winston-Salem Prep Academy

== Non-traditional schools ==
- Carter High
- The Children's Center (PK-5)
- Kingswood High
- Lowrance Middle
- Main Street Academy (6-12)
- Special Children's School (PK-5)
- Virtual Academy (PK-12)

== See also ==
- List of school districts in North Carolina
