= 2020 Liberty Bowl =

Postseason college football bowl game

2020 AutoZone Liberty Bowl
- 62nd Liberty Bowl
West Virginia Mountaineers	Army Black Knights
(5–4)	(9–2)
Big 12	Independent
24	21
Head coach: Neal Brown	Head coach: Jeff Monken
	1	2	3	4	Total
West Virginia	3	7	6	8	24
Army	0	14	7	0	21
- Date: December 31, 2020
- Season: 2020
- Stadium: Liberty Bowl Memorial Stadium
- Location: Memphis, Tennessee
- MVP: T. J. Simmons (WR, West Virginia)
- Favorite: West Virginia by 9.5
- Referee: Stuart Mullins (ACC)
- Attendance: 8,187

United States TV coverage
- Network: ESPN and ESPN Radio
- Announcers: ESPN: Wes Durham (play-by-play), Roddy Jones (analyst) and Eric Wood (sideline); ESPN Radio: Jay Alter (play-by-play) and Brad Edwards (analyst)

International TV coverage
- Network: ESPN Deportes

The 2020 Liberty Bowl was a college football bowl game played on December 31, 2020, with kickoff at 4:00 p.m. EST (3:00 p.m. local CST) on ESPN. It was the 62nd edition of the Liberty Bowl, and was one of the 2020–21 bowl games concluding the 2020 FBS football season. Sponsored by automotive retailer AutoZone, the game was officially known as the AutoZone Liberty Bowl.

== Teams ==
Based on conference tie-ins, the bowl was expected to feature teams from the Southeastern Conference (SEC) and the Big 12 Conference. After a matchup of West Virginia of the Big 12 and Tennessee of the SEC was announced on December 20, the Tennessee program had to withdraw on December 21 due to positive COVID-19 testing. Army, who had accepted an invitation to the Independence Bowl before it was canceled due to a lack of available teams, was named as their replacement.

=== West Virginia Mountaineers ===
West Virginia of the Big 12 entered the Liberty Bowl with a 5–4 record, 4–4 in conference play. The Mountaineers' most recent bowl game was the 2018 Camping World Bowl, and their most recent bowl win was the 2016 Cactus Bowl (January). They had two prior appearances in the Liberty Bowl, losing in the 1964 and the 2014 editions.

=== Army Black Knights ===
Army, which competed as an independent, entered the Liberty Bowl with a 9–2 record. The Black Knights' most recent bowl game, and bowl win, was the 2018 Armed Forces Bowl. This edition marked Army's first Liberty Bowl appearance.

== Game summary ==
2020 AutoZone Liberty Bowl

Quarter	1	2	3	4	Total
West Virginia	3	7	6	8	24
Army	0	14	7	0	21

at Liberty Bowl Memorial Stadium • Memphis, Tennessee

- Date: Thursday, December 31, 2020
- Game time: 4:00 p.m. EST (3:00 p.m. CST)
- Game weather: Rain • Temperature: 38 °F (3 °C) • Wind: NE 13 mph
- Referee: Stuart Mullins (ACC)
- TV announcers (ESPN): Wes Durham (play-by-play), Roddy Jones (analyst) and Eric Wood (sideline)
- ESPN game summary

Game information

First quarter

- (1:47) WVU – Tyler Sumpter 31 yard field goal (Drive: 7 plays, 48 yards, 2:33; West Virginia 3–0)

Second quarter

- (9:31) ARMY – Tyhier Tyler 1 yard rush, Quinn Maretzki kick (Drive: 14 plays, 74 yards, 7:12; Army 7–3)
- (4:21) WVU – T.J. Simmons 5 yard pass from Jarret Doege, Tyler Sumpter kick (Drive: 12 plays, 77 yards, 5:04; West Virginia 10–7)
- (1:14) ARMY – Tyhier Tyler 6 yard rush, Quinn Maretzki kick (Drive: 2 plays, 7 yards, 0:38; Army 14–10)

Third quarter

- (7:00) ARMY – Tyhier Tyler 2 yard rush, Quinn Maretzki kick (Drive: 13 plays, 75 yards, 8:00; Army 21–10)
- (3:23) WVU – Mike O'Laughlin 3 yard pass from Austin Kendall, two-point conversion failed (Drive: 10 plays, 80 yards, 3:37; Army 21–16)

Fourth quarter

- (5:10) WVU – T.J. Simmons 20 yard pass from Austin Kendall, two-point conversion good (Drive: 8 plays, 65 yards, 3:11; West Virginia 24–21)

=== Statistics ===
Statistics	WVU	ARMY
First downs	19	15
Plays–yards	69–322	65–239
Rushes–yards	27–42	59–182
Passing yards	280	57
Passing: comp–att–int	23–42–1	4–6–1
Time of possession	26:18	33:41

Team	Category	Player	Statistics
West Virginia	Passing	Jarret Doege	15-for-25 for 159 yards, 1 TD 1 INT
West Virginia	Rushing	Leddie Brown	65 yards on 20 carries
West Virginia	Receiving	T.J. Simmons	56 yards on 4 receptions, 2 TD
Army	Passing	Christian Anderson	4-for-6 for 57 yards, 1 INT
Army	Rushing	Tyhier Tyler	76 yards on 24 carries, 3 TD
Army	Receiving	Chris Cameron	32 yards on 1 reception

Tyhier Tyler tied the Liberty Bowl record for rushing touchdowns, with three.
