= Nate Woody =

American football player and coach (born 1960)

Current position
- Title: Defensive coordinator
- Team: Cincinnati
- Conference: Big 12

Biographical details
- Born: December 30, 1960 (age 65); Burlington, North Carolina, U.S.

Playing career
- 1980–1983: Wofford
- Positions: Defensive back, linebacker

Coaching career (HC unless noted)
- 1988–1993: Wofford (DE)
- 1997–1999: Wofford (LB)
- 2000–2012: Wofford (DC)
- 2013: Appalachian State (DC/ILB)
- 2014–2017: Appalachian State (DC/OLB)
- 2018: Georgia Tech (DC)
- 2019: Michigan (defensive analyst)
- 2020–2025: Army (DC)
- 2026–present: Cincinnati (DC)

Nate Woody (born December 30, 1960) is an American college football coach. He is the current defensive coordinator for the Cincinnati Bearcats. Prior to Cincinnati, Woody was the defensive coordinator for the Army Black Knights, from 2020 to 2026. In 2019 Woody worked at the University of Michigan as the senior defensive analyst. He was the former defensive coordinator of the Georgia Tech Yellow Jackets. He previously held the same position at Wofford from 2000 to 2012, and at Appalachian State from 2013 to 2017. In 2015 he was nominated for the Broyles Award for the best assistant coach in college football. He was selected a semi finalist for the Broyles in 2024. He is a graduate of T. L. Hanna High School.

== Coaching career ==
=== Appalachian State ===
On January 14, 2013, Woody was named the defensive coordinator of Appalachian State. The Mountaineers went 4-8 in 2013 during their first year in transition to FBS. Under his coaching, defensive lineman Ronald Blair Jr. was named All-SoCon first-team and defensive back Joel Ross Jr. was named second-team.

During the 2014 season, the Mountaineers moved to the Sun Belt Conference and went 7-5 and were not eligible for a bowl game due to changing divisions. Under his coaching, defensive back Doug Middleton was named All-Sun Belt first-team and defensive lineman Ronald Blair Jr was named second-team.

In 2015, Appalachian State was eligible for bowl games in FBS. They went 11-2 and were invited to their first bowl game. They would go on to win the 2015 Camellia Bowl 31-29 against Ohio. Under his coaching, defensive lineman Ronald Blair, linebacker John Law, and defensive back Doug Middleton was named All-Sun Belt first-team. In the 2016 NFL draft, defensive lineman Ronald Blair was taken in the 5th round with the 142nd pick by the San Francisco 49ers.

During the 2016 season, the Mountaineers went 10-3 and was co-champions of the Sun Belt Conference, sharing with Arkansas State. They would go on to win the 2016 Camellia Bowl 31-28 against Toledo. Under his coaching, defensive backs Clifton Duck and Mondo Williams were named All-Sun Belt first-team and defensive lineman Dezmin Reed and Tee Sims along with linebackers Eric Boggs and Kennan Gilchrist were named second-team. Defensive lineman Myquon Stout and defensive back A.J. Howard were honorable mentions.

At the end of Woody's final year with the Mountaineers, the team went 9-4 and were co-champs of the Sun Belt conference. They would defeat Toledo in the 2017 Dollar General Bowl 34-0. Under his coaching, defensive lineman Tee Sims, linebacker Eric Boggs, and defensive back Clifton Duck were named All-Sun Belt first-team. Defensive back Tae Hayes was named second-team and defensive lineman Caleb Fuller, linebacker Devan Springer, and defensive back A.J. Howard were named third-team. Linebacker Anthony Flory and defensive lineman Myquon Stout were honorable mentions.

=== Georgia Tech ===
On January 6, 2018, Woody was named the defensive coordinator of Georgia Tech. The Yellow Jackets went 7-6 and qualified for a bowl game. They would go on to lose the 2018 Quick Lane Bowl 10-34 to Minnesota.
