= Career Center (Winston-Salem, North Carolina) =

American alternate high school in North Carolina

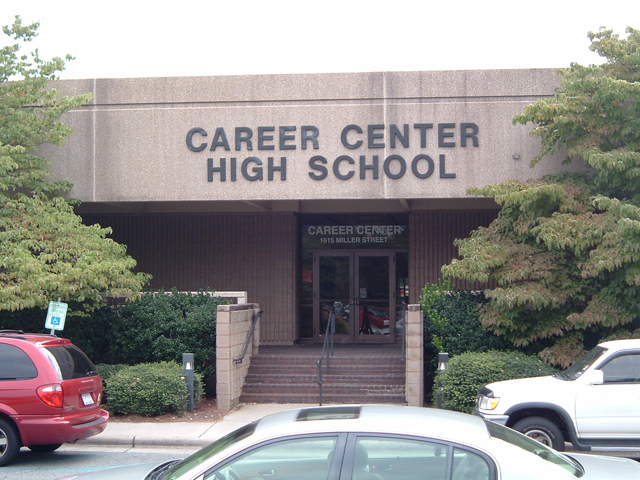

Location
- 910 Highland Court; Winston-Salem, North Carolina 27101; United States
- Coordinates: 36°06′26″N 80°14′05″W

Information
- School type: Alternate High School
- School board: Winston-Salem/Forsyth County Schools
- Superintendent: Dr. Don Phipps
- Principal: Nancy Martinez
- Grades: 9–12
- Enrollment: 2400 (2014)
- Language: English
- Campus type: Urban
- Colors: Maroon and gray (unofficial)
- Website: www.wsfcs.k12.nc.us/cc

The Career Center is a high school located in Winston-Salem, North Carolina. It offers an extension to the regular high school program. Classes offered include Advanced Placement courses, career, technical education (CTE) courses, English, and classes too small to be held at the regular high schools in the Winston-Salem/Forsyth County Schools program, such as Japanese and Chinese. It also offers extended day classes, which are held after school that allow students to "make up" for a failed class in order to graduate.

The school moved to a new facility in January 2012, after a bond vote sold its previous facility to Forsyth Technical Community College.

== Career-related classes ==
The Career Center offers classes related to specific fields. These classes, usually about 1.5 hours (two periods) long, are designed to help students gain a better understanding in that specific field, and better prepares them for it. They are taught by professionals in that specific industry.
