= Jon Rhattigan =

American football player (born 1999)

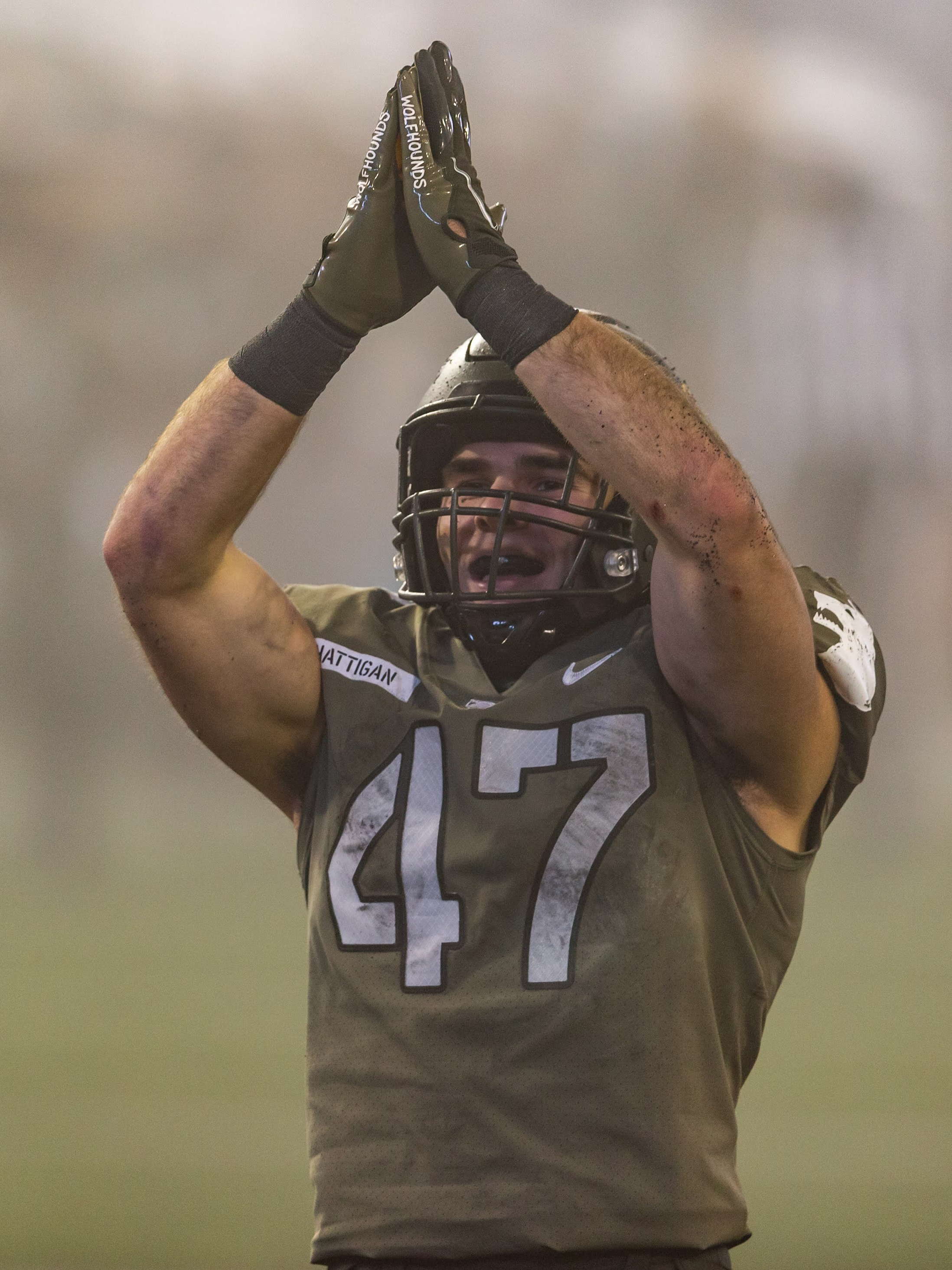
- Rhattigan with Army in 2020

No. 58 – Los Angeles Rams
- Position: Linebacker
- Roster status: Practice squad

Personal information
- Born: February 2, 1999 (age 27); Naperville, Illinois, U.S.
- Listed height: 6 ft 0 in (1.83 m)
- Listed weight: 236 lb (107 kg)

Career information
- High school: Neuqua Valley (Naperville)
- College: Army (2017–2020)
- NFL draft: 2021: undrafted

Career history
- Seattle Seahawks (2021–2023); Carolina Panthers (2024); Pittsburgh Steelers (2025); Las Vegas Raiders (2025); Chicago Bears (2026)*; Los Angeles Rams (2026–present)*
- * Offseason or practice squad member only

Career NFL statistics as of 2025
- Total tackles: 50
- Fumble recoveries: 1
- Stats at Pro Football Reference

Jon Rhattigan (born February 2, 1999) is an American professional football linebacker for the Los Angeles Rams of the National Football League (NFL). He played college football for the Army Black Knights. He has previously played for the Seattle Seahawks, Carolina Panthers, and Pittsburgh Steelers.

== College career ==
Rhattigan played for the Army Black Knights for four seasons and did not become a starter for the team until he was a senior. He finished his senior season with 78 total tackles, 9 tackles for loss, 1.5 sacks, 2 interceptions, 2 pass break ups and 2 fumble recoveries.

== Professional career ==
Pre-draft measurables
Height	Weight	Arm length	Hand span	Wingspan	40-yard dash	10-yard split	20-yard split	20-yard shuttle	Three-cone drill	Vertical jump	Broad jump	Bench press
6 ft 0 3/8 in (1.84 m)	236 lb (107 kg)	31 5/8 in (0.80 m)	10 1/2 in (0.27 m)	6 ft 3 3/4 in (1.92 m)	4.77 s	1.74 s	2.80 s	4.30 s	7.41 s	32.0 in (0.81 m)	9 ft 3 in (2.82 m)	22 reps
All values from Pro Day

=== Seattle Seahawks ===
Rhattigan signed with the Seattle Seahawks as an undrafted free agent on May 13, 2021. He was waived by the Seahawks during final roster cuts on August 31 and re-signed to the team's practice squad the following day. In doing so, he became the first Seahawks player on the roster from Army. Before the team's season opener, he was elevated, and later signed, to the active roster. He was placed on injured reserve on January 1, 2022.

On July 26, 2022, Rhattigan was placed on the active/physically unable to perform list, and on the reserve list on August 24 to start the season. He was activated on December 10.

On August 30, 2023, Rhattigan was waived by the Seahawks and re-signed to the practice squad the following day. On September 28, he was promoted to the team's active roster after wide receiver Cody Thompson was waived.

On August 27, 2024, Rhattigan was waived by the Seahawks as part of final roster cuts.

=== Carolina Panthers ===
On August 28, 2024, Rhattigan was claimed off waivers by the Carolina Panthers.

On August 26, 2025, Rhattigan was released by the Panthers as part of final roster cuts.

=== Pittsburgh Steelers ===
On September 3, 2025, Rhattigan signed with the practice squad of the Pittsburgh Steelers.

=== Las Vegas Raiders ===
On October 7, 2025, Rhattigan was signed by the Las Vegas Raiders.

=== Chicago Bears ===
On May 11, 2026, Rhattigan signed with the Chicago Bears. He was released by the Bears on August 30.

=== Los Angeles Rams ===
On October 27, 2026, Rhattigan signed with the Los Angeles Rams practice squad.

== NFL career statistics ==
Legend
**Bold**	Career high

=== Regular season ===
Year	Team	Games		Tackles					Interceptions						Fumbles				
Year	Team	GP	GS	Cmb	Solo	Ast	Sck	TFL	Int	Yds	Avg	Lng	TD	PD	FF	Fum	FR	Yds	TD
2021	SEA	14	0	10	10	0	0.0	0	0	0	0.0	0	0	0	0	0	**1**	0	0
2022	SEA	5	0	5	2	3	0.0	0	0	0	0.0	0	0	0	0	0	0	0	0
2023	SEA	**17**	0	**17**	**11**	**6**	0.0	0	0	0	0.0	0	0	0	0	0	0	0	0
2024	CAR	16	0	12	6	**6**	0.0	0	0	0	0.0	0	0	0	0	0	0	0	0
2025	PIT	1	0	0	0	0	0.0	0	0	0	0.0	0	0	0	0	0	0	0	0
2025	LV	12	0	6	1	5	0.0	0	0	0	0.0	0	0	0	0	0	0	0	0
Career		65	0	50	30	20	0.0	0	0	0	0.0	0	0	0	0	0	1	0	0

=== Postseason ===
Year	Team	Games		Tackles					Interceptions						Fumbles				
Year	Team	GP	GS	Cmb	Solo	Ast	Sck	TFL	Int	Yds	Avg	Lng	TD	PD	FF	Fum	FR	Yds	TD
2022	SEA	1	0	1	0	1	0.0	0	0	0	0.0	0	0	0	0	0	0	0	0
Career		1	0	1	0	1	0.0	0	0	0	0.0	0	0	0	0	0	0	0	0
