= Doug Middleton =

American football player (born 1993)

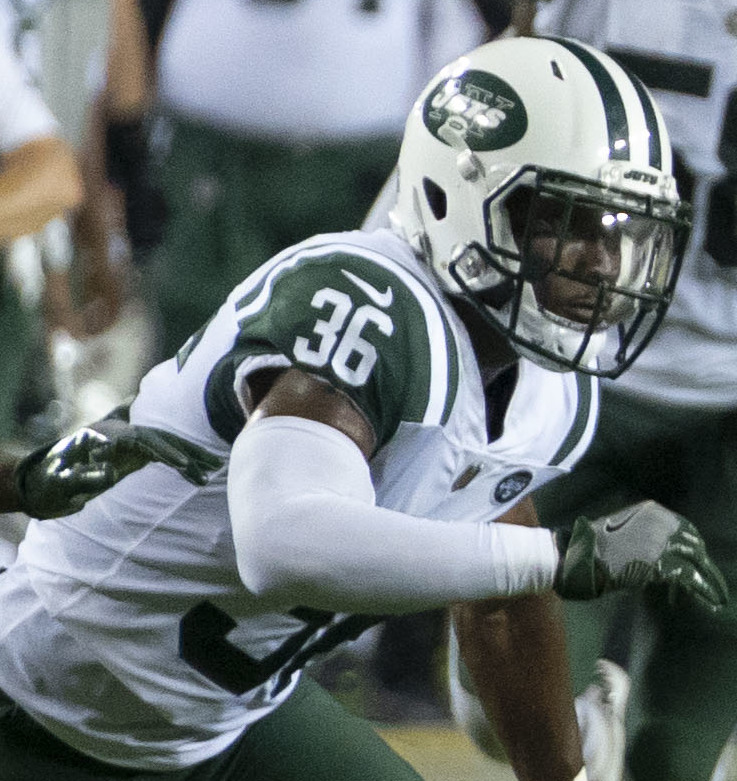
- Middleton with the New York Jets in 2018

No. 36, 39
- Position: Safety

Personal information
- Born: September 25, 1993 (age 33); Beaufort, South Carolina, U.S.
- Listed height: 6 ft 0 in (1.83 m)
- Listed weight: 210 lb (95 kg)

Career information
- High school: Parkland Magnet (Winston-Salem, North Carolina)
- College: Appalachian State
- NFL draft: 2016: undrafted

Career history
- New York Jets (2016–2018); Miami Dolphins (2019); Jacksonville Jaguars (2019); Tennessee Titans (2020)*; Jacksonville Jaguars (2020); Carolina Panthers (2021)*; San Francisco 49ers (2021)*
- * Offseason or practice squad member only

Awards and highlights
- First-team All-Sun Belt (2014)

Career NFL statistics
- Total tackles: 44
- Pass deflections: 4
- Total touchdowns: 1
- Stats at Pro Football Reference

Douglas O'Neal Middleton Jr. (born September 25, 1993) is an American former professional football player who was a safety in the National Football League (NFL). He played college football for the Appalachian State Mountaineers and signed with the New York Jets as an undrafted free agent in 2016.

== Early life and college ==
Middleton attended Parkland High School in Winston-Salem, North Carolina, and Appalachian State University, where he played college football for the Appalachian State Mountaineers. As a junior in 2014, Middleton was named First-team All-Sun Belt Conference.

== Professional career ==
=== New York Jets ===
Middleton signed with the New York Jets as an undrafted free agent on May 5, 2016. He was waived on September 3, 2016, and was signed to the practice squad the next day. He was promoted to the active roster on December 8, 2016. He scored his first and only career NFL touchdown in Week 17 against the Buffalo Bills, recovering a kickoff in the Bills' end zone.

On August 16, 2017, Middleton was waived/injured by the Jets after suffering a torn pectoral and placed on injured reserve.

Middleton entered the 2018 season slated as the backup free safety to Marcus Maye. He played in seven games with four starts in place of the injured Maye, before suffering another torn pectoral in Week 7. He was placed on injured reserve on October 23, 2018.

On September 1, 2019, Middleton was released by the Jets.

=== Miami Dolphins ===
On September 18, 2019, Middleton was signed by the Miami Dolphins. He was released on October 12, and re-signed to the practice squad on October 31. He was released on November 12.

=== Jacksonville Jaguars (first stint) ===
On November 26, 2019, Middleton was signed to the Jacksonville Jaguars practice squad. He was promoted to the active roster on December 18, 2019.

On August 8, 2020, Middleton was released by the Jaguars.

=== Tennessee Titans ===
Middleton had a tryout with the Indianapolis Colts on August 18, 2020, and with the Tennessee Titans on August 23, 2020. He signed with the Titans on September 2, 2020, but was released three days later.

=== Jacksonville Jaguars (second stint) ===
On September 18, 2020, Middleton was signed to the Jacksonville Jaguars practice squad. He was promoted to the active roster on October 3, 2020. He was released on October 5 and re-signed to the practice squad the next day. He was placed on the practice squad/COVID-19 list by the team on October 17, 2020, and was activated back to the practice squad on October 22. He was promoted to the active roster on November 7. He was waived on November 9, and re-signed to the practice squad two days later. He was promoted to the active roster again on November 14. He was waived again on November 21, and re-signed to the practice squad again three days later. He was promoted to the active roster again on November 25. He was released after the season on May 4, 2021.

=== Carolina Panthers ===
On August 4, 2021, Middleton was signed by the Carolina Panthers. He was waived on August 28, 2021. He was re-signed to the practice squad on October 13, but released the next day.

=== San Francisco 49ers ===
On December 1, 2021, Middleton was signed to the San Francisco 49ers practice squad. He was released on January 26, 2022.
