= Parkland Magnet High School =

American public secondary school in North Carolina

Location
- 1600 Brewer Road; Winston-Salem, North Carolina 27127; United States; 36°03′26″N 80°15′26″W

Information
- Other names: Parkland High School (1965–2006)
- School type: Public secondary
- Founded: 1965 (61 years ago)
- School district: Winston-Salem/Forsyth County Schools
- Superintendent: Tricia McManus
- CEEB code: 344444
- Principal: Noel Keener
- Teaching staff: 98.00 (FTE)
- Grades: 9–12
- Enrollment: 1,638 (2023-2024)
- Student to teacher ratio: 16.71
- Language: English
- Colors: Red, White, and Blue
- Athletics: NCHSAA 7A
- Athletics conference: Central Piedmont 7A/8A
- Mascot: Mustang
- Newspaper: The Hitching Post
- Yearbook: The Spectatus
- Website: www.wsfcs.k12.nc.us/o/phs

Parkland Magnet High School is a magnet school in Winston-Salem, North Carolina that offers an International Baccalaureate program and describes itself as a "Center for the Cultural Arts". Parkland was founded in 1965 as Parkland High School.

The school's campus is located on the south side of Winston-Salem, and is easily accessible from Interstate 40, US Highway 52, and Peters Creek Parkway.

The campus includes a main building, several multi-classroom pod trailers, a practice football field, competition track, baseball and softball fields. The main building houses the school's administrative offices, cafeteria, two gymnasiums, and auditorium as well as 80 classrooms. The football & lacrosse teams plays their home games at Deaton-Thompson stadium located off West Clemmonsville Road which is located approximately 1.4 miles from the school's campus. The soccer teams play their home games at the W-S/FC Soccer Complex on Bolton street, which is approximately 3.2 miles from Parkland's campus.

== Academics ==
Parkland Magnet High School is an accredited International Baccalaureate World School. The IB Diploma Programme itself takes place during the 11th and 12th grades, however the foundation necessary for success in the program is laid in 9th and 10th grade courses. The rigorous course of study provides a liberal arts curriculum from a global perspective, university-level work, and required examinations that are developed and marked on an international standard.

In addition to the International Baccalaureate program, Parkland also offers a conventional course load for its students.

== Athletics ==
Parkland is a member of the North Carolina High School Athletic Association (NCHSAA) and is classified as a 7A school. They compete in the Central Piedmont 7A/8A Conference. The school's mascot is the Mustang, with the school colors being red, white, and blue.

=== Wrestling Team ===
The Parkland wrestling team under Coach Maurice Atwood went on an unbeaten streak from 2006–2014, winning 365 dual meets in a row. During this time they won 8 straight dual team state championships and 7 state tournament team championships. Parkland would also have many wrestlers win individual state championships during their win streak, with wrestlers also claiming All-American and National Champion honors at the NHSCA national tournament. Parkland's win streak was the longest consecutive stretch of dual meet victories in the country at the time, and second all-time behind Brandon High School (Florida).

=== State Championships ===
Parkland has won the following NCHSAA team state championships:

- Men's Basketball: 1999 (3A)
- Football: 2001 (3A)
- Men's Indoor Track & Field: 2007 (1A/2A/3A)
- Women's Indoor Track & Field: 2014 (4A), 2015 (4A)
- Women's Outdoor Track & Field: 2014 (4A), 2015 (4A), 2019 (3A)
- Wrestling Dual Team: 1995 (3A), 1996 (3A), 2007 (3A), 2008 (3A), 2009 (3A), 2010 (4A), 2011 (4A), 2012 (4A), 2013 (4A), 2014 (4A)
- Wrestling State Tournament Team: 1997 (3A), 2007 (3A), 2008 (3A), 2009 (3A), 2010 (4A), 2011 (4A), 2013 (4A), 2014 (4A)

== Notable alumni ==
- Cy Alexander — college basketball head coach
- Chris Barber — professional football player
- Tony Covington — professional football player
- Doug Middleton — professional football player
- Eric Daniel Peddle — screenwriter, film director and author
- Vickie Sawyer — member of the North Carolina State Senate
