= Austin Kendall =

American football player (born 1998)

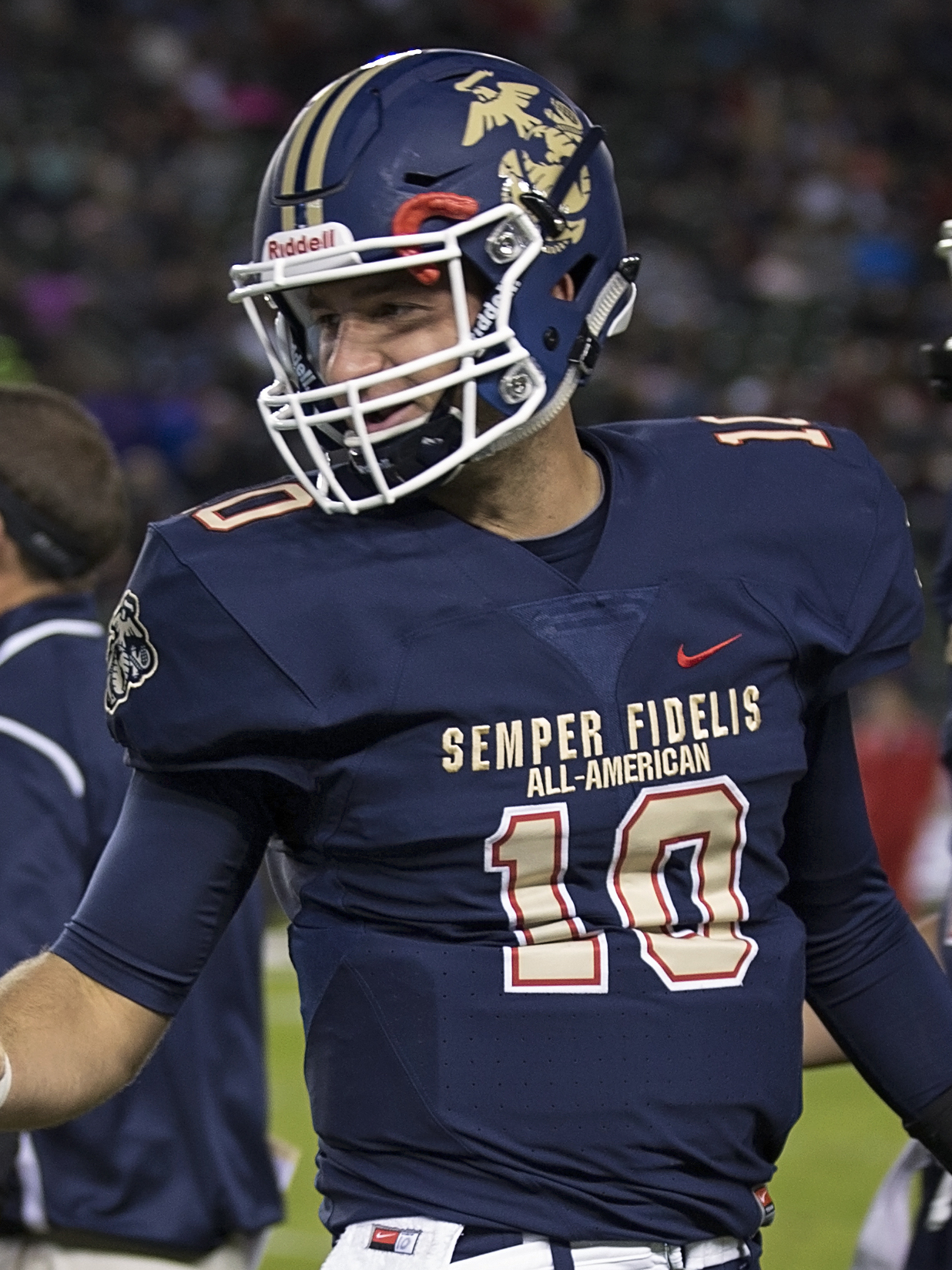
- Kendall at the 2016 Semper Fidelis All-American Bowl

No. 12
- Position: Quarterback

Personal information
- Born: January 21, 1998 (age 28); Waxhaw, North Carolina, U.S.
- Listed height: 6 ft 2 in (1.88 m)
- Listed weight: 221 lb (100 kg)

Career information
- High school: Cuthbertson (Waxhaw, North Carolina)
- College: Oklahoma (2016–2018); West Virginia (2019–2020); Louisiana Tech (2021)
- Stats at ESPN

Austin Kendall (born January 21, 1998) is an American former college football quarterback.

== Early life ==
Kendall attended Cuthbertson High School in Waxhaw, North Carolina. He committed to the University of Oklahoma to play college football.

== College career ==
=== Oklahoma ===
As a freshman at Oklahoma in 2016, Kendall appeared in two games as a backup to Baker Mayfield, completing 16 of 22 passes for 143 yards with two touchdowns. After redshirting in 2017, Kendall appeared in six games and made one start as the backup to Kyler Murray. For the season, he completed 12 of 17 passes for 122 yards and one touchdown. In 2018, he played in four games where he threw for 122 yards and one touchdown.

=== West Virginia ===
==== 2019 ====
Prior to the 2019 season, Kendall was expected to be a contender for the Sooners' starting quarterback. However, he entered the NCAA transfer portal shortly after Jalen Hurts transferred to Oklahoma. Kendall transferred to West Virginia University before the start of the season as a graduate transfer. Initially, Oklahoma was not willing to grant Kendall immediate eligibility to play at West Virginia, citing an NCAA rule giving them such power if he transferred to another school in the same conference (both Oklahoma and West Virginia are members of the Big 12 Conference). However, after some media backlash, Oklahoma acquiesced and Kendall was granted immediate eligibility with the Mountaineers.

In his first year at West Virginia, he was named the starting quarterback. However, Kendall had an inconsistent play, and led the Mountaineers to a disappointing 5–7 record.

==== 2020 ====
Kendall came into the 2020 season competing with fellow quarterback transfer Jarret Doege. Doege eventually won the starting position, and Kendall was demoted to the backup position. He saw little playing time throughout the season, and did not see significant playing time until the 2020 Liberty Bowl against Army. He would lead the Mountaineers to a 24–21 comeback victory over the Black Knights.

=== Louisiana Tech ===
Kendall transferred to Louisiana Tech for the 2021 season. He won the starting position. In his debut, Kendall went 20-for-36 on pass attempts, threw for 269 yards, 2 touchdowns, and 1 interception in the 35–34 loss to Mississippi State. He won his first game with the Bulldogs in a 45–42 win over Southeastern Louisiana. However, Kendall struggled with inconsistency, and was replaced as starter during the season. He had a 2–7 record as starter in his first year with Louisiana Tech.

== Personal life ==
Kendall's father, Brian, played quarterback at Georgia and his brother, Ryan, was a wide receiver at Kentucky.
