= Independence Bowl =

Annual college football bowl game in Shreveport, Louisiana

- Radiance Technologies Independence Bowl
- Stadium: Independence Stadium
- Location: Shreveport, Louisiana
- Operated: 1976–present
- Conference tie-ins: Big 12, Pac-12 Legacy
- Previous conference tie-ins: SLC (1976–1981); SEC (1995–2009); Big 12 (1998–2009); MWC (2010–2011); ACC (2010–2019); SEC (2012–2019)
- Payout: US$2.2 million (2019)
- Website: radiancetechnologiesindependencebowl.com

Sponsors
- Poulan (1990–1997); Sanford (1998–2000); MainStay Funds (2001–2003); PetroSun (2006–2007); AdvoCare (2009–2013); Duck Commander (2014); Camping World (2015–2016); Walk-On's (2017–2019); Radiance Technologies (2020–present)

Former names
- Independence Bowl (1976–1989); Poulan/Weed Eater Independence Bowl (1990–1997); Sanford Independence Bowl (1998–2000); MainStay Independence Bowl (2001–2003); Independence Bowl (2004–2005); PetroSun Independence Bowl (2006–2008); AdvoCare V100 Independence Bowl (2008–2012); AdvoCare V100 Bowl (2013); Duck Commander Independence Bowl (2014); Camping World Independence Bowl (2015–2016); Walk-On's Independence Bowl (2017–2019)

2025 matchup
- Coastal Carolina vs. Louisiana Tech (Louisiana Tech 23–14)

The Independence Bowl is a post-season National Collegiate Athletic Association (NCAA)-sanctioned Division I college football bowl game that is played annually each December at Independence Stadium in Shreveport, Louisiana. The Independence Bowl was named because it was inaugurated in 1976, the year of the United States Bicentennial. The bowl's current title sponsor is Radiance Technologies, per an agreement announced for the 2020–2025 editions. Only one prior edition of the bowl, in 2013, has not used Independence Bowl branding.

The 2020 edition of the bowl was canceled on December 20, 2020, due to an insufficient number of teams being available to fill all 2020-21 bowl games, following a season impacted by the COVID-19 pandemic.

== Conference tie-ins ==
For its first five years, the game pitted the champion of the Southland Conference against an at-large opponent. It then moved to inviting two at-large teams, until 1995 when it began featuring a Southeastern Conference (SEC) school against an at-large opponent.

From 1998 to 2009, the game normally featured a matchup between teams representing the Big 12 Conference and the SEC. Teams from other conferences were included only if one of those leagues did not have enough bowl-eligible teams to fill its spot, such as in 2004 when Miami (Ohio) played instead of an SEC squad. In 2008, neither the SEC nor the Big 12 had enough bowl-eligible teams to fill their respective spots resulting in a matchup of Louisiana Tech of the Western Athletic Conference (WAC) and Northern Illinois of the Mid-American Conference (MAC).

In 2010 and 2011, the Independence Bowl held the third selection from the Mountain West Conference and the seventh selection from the Atlantic Coast Conference (ACC). It was announced that in 2012, the Mountain West Conference team would be replaced by the 10th selection from the SEC.

The bowl has multiple conference and team tie-ins for the 2020 through 2025 seasons. Both the SEC and ACC announced bowl lineups for those years that did not include the Independence Bowl. In January 2020, the bowl announced a six-year sequence of games that will feature an independent program (either Army or BYU) against a team from either the Pac-12, Conference USA (C-USA), or the American Athletic Conference (The American). Once BYU joined the Big 12 in 2023, the bowl announced that a bid to the Big 12 overall would replace BYU in their upcoming schedule rotation.

Even though ten of the Pac-12 teams departed that conference beginning with the 2024 season, it was announced that the remaining two teams, or the ten "legacy teams" (those leaving the conference), would fulfill the Pac-12's obligation for the 2024 Independence Bowl.

For the bowl's 50th anniversary in 2026, the tie-ins were assigned to the Big 12 and the Pac-12's legacy members. Four of the Pac-12's previous schools had already departed for the Big 12 by this time.

== Notable games ==
One of the most memorable games in Independence Bowl history was the 2000 edition, the "snow bowl" game between Texas A&M and Mississippi State. The game was originally publicized as a reunion game, since Mississippi State coach Jackie Sherrill had served as A&M's coach for seven seasons in the 1980s and led them to three conference titles. However, the weather quickly dominated the storyline as a rare and significant snowstorm hit Shreveport. In the midst of the snow, Mississippi State rallied to an overtime win over A&M.

The bowl has intermittently hosted ranked teams; the first (and to date, only) matchup between ranked opponents (per the AP Poll) was the 1993 edition between No. 22 Virginia Tech and No. 21 Indiana. The highest ranked team to appear was No. 12 BYU in the 2021 edition.

The only tie game in Independence Bowl history was the 1990 edition, between Louisiana Tech and Maryland. The only overtime game has been the aforementioned 2000 edition, between Texas A&M and Mississippi State.

The 2015 edition set a college football bowl record with 76 points scored in one half, occurring in the first half between Tulsa and Virginia Tech.

In 2020, the Independence Bowl issued the first invitation of the bowl season, to Army, in late October. However, the game was ultimately canceled, when organizers were left without an opponent for Army, as there were insufficient teams available to fill all bowl slots. Army was later placed in the Liberty Bowl.

The 2024 edition was originally set to feature Marshall and Army. However, Marshall withdrew from the contest after a number of its players entered the NCAA transfer portal. Louisiana Tech was named as a replacement, and Marshall was later fined $100,000 by their conference for opting out of the bowl.

== Title sponsor ==
In 1990, the contest became one of the earliest college bowl games to use a title sponsor, becoming the Poulan Weed-Eater Independence Bowl. Poulan (then a division of AB Electrolux Home Products, now Husqvarna AB) sponsored the game through the 1997 edition. The unusual nature of a game being sponsored by a weed-eater company has made the name synonymous with bowl games with odd sponsors, and "Weedeater (or Weedwhacker) Bowl" is still used as an example of a consolation bowl for teams that have disappointing seasons. Newell Rubbermaid's Sanford brand of writing products took over sponsorship from 1998 until 2000, while MainStay Investments sponsored from 2001 to 2003. In January 2005, the Deja Vu chain of "gentlemen's clubs" offered to become the title sponsor. The offer was rejected.

The Independence Bowl's three-year search for a title sponsor ended on August 21, 2006, when PetroSun Inc., a Phoenix, Arizona-based company that provides services and products to suppliers of oil and gas, agreed to become the bowl's sponsor. The deal, changing the game's full name to the PetroSun Independence Bowl, was to have run through 2008 with an option for 2009; however the deal was discontinued prior to the 2008 game.

On May 21, 2009, AdvoCare became the fifth title sponsor since the bowl's inception. The bowl was then renamed the AdvoCare V100 Independence Bowl. AdvoCare makes energy drinks and nutritional supplements sold through multilevel marketing. On February 28, 2013, AdvoCare and the Independence Bowl Foundation announced that the Independence Bowl name would be dropped, and the bowl would be known as the AdvoCare V100 Bowl for the 2013 game. In August 2013, AdvoCare announced it would drop its sponsorship after the 2013 game.

In February 2014, Duck Commander (a duck call and hunting apparel manufacturer founded by former Louisiana Tech quarterback Phil Robertson, made prominent by the reality series Duck Dynasty) announced that it would be the title sponsor for the 2014 bowl, known as the Duck Commander Independence Bowl. After a year, Duck Commander declined to renew sponsorship, and in July 2015, Camping World was announced as the new title sponsor of the game; Camping World Independence Bowl was the branding of the 2015 and 2016 games. On March 14, 2017, the Independence Bowl Foundation unveiled a new logo for the game, used until a new title sponsor was signed. On October 5, 2017, Walk-On's Bistreaux & Bar was named as the new title sponsor of the game; Walk-On's Independence Bowl branding was used for the 2017 through 2019 games. On August 8, 2019, Walk On's announced that it would end its sponsorship after the 2019 edition. On April 28, 2020, Radiance Technologies was announced as the new title sponsor, with the bowl officially named as the Radiance Technologies Independence Bowl.

== Independence Stadium ==
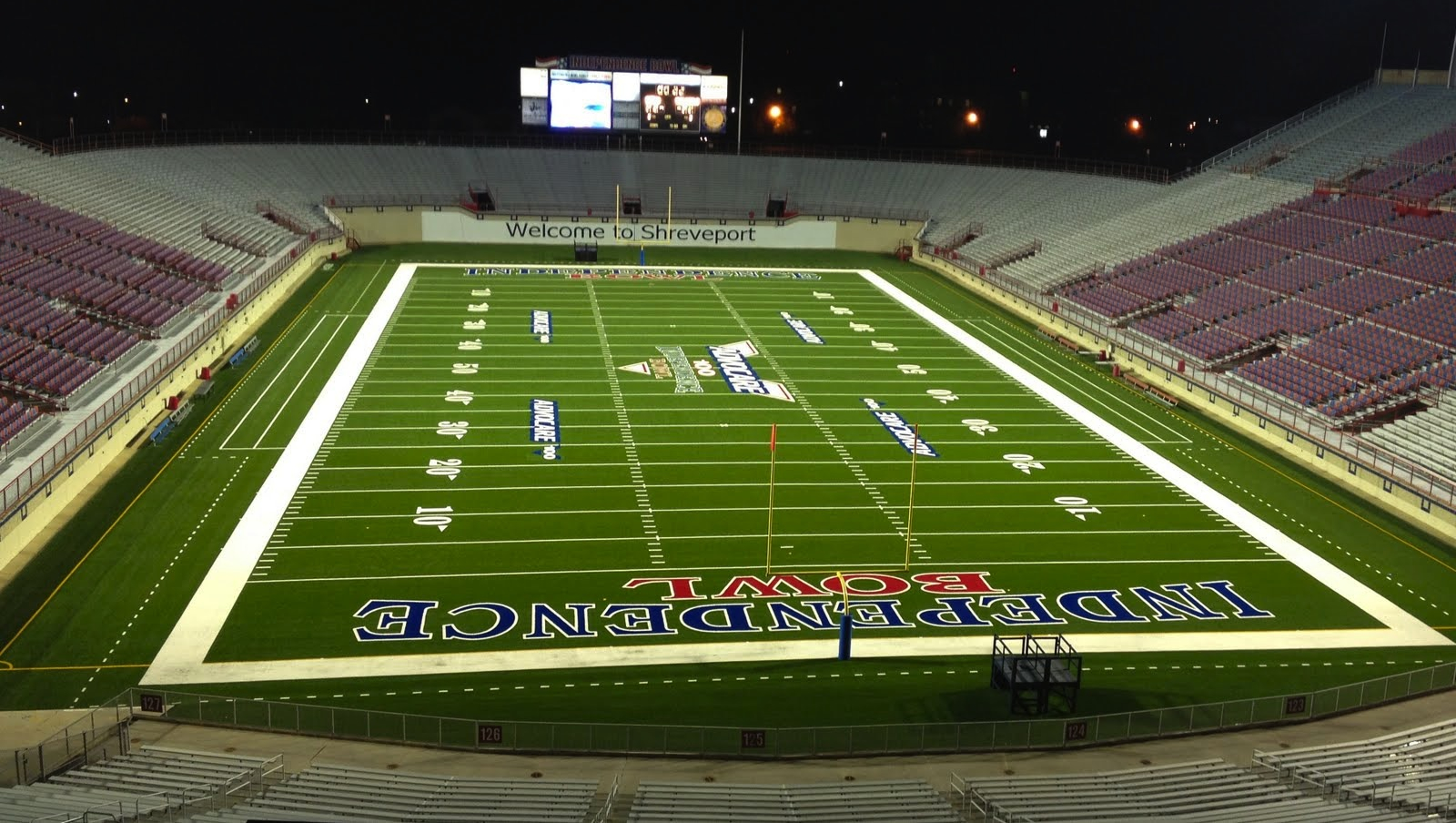
Independence Stadium

Independence Stadium is a stadium owned by the city of Shreveport, Louisiana. It used to be known as "State Fair Stadium"; it is the site of the annual Independence Bowl post-season college football game, initially (1976) the Bicentennial Bowl. Before that, it was the home venue of the Shreveport Steamer of the short-lived World Football League (1974–75). It also served as a neutral site for the annual Arkansas–LSU football rivalry from 1925 to 1936. The stadium is also host to numerous high school football games and soccer matches, since many schools in Shreveport lack an on-campus facility. Independence Stadium also hosted the Louisiana High School Athletic Association state football championship games in 2005 after the Louisiana Superdome suffered heavy damage from Hurricane Katrina. In 1994–95, Independence Stadium was home to the Shreveport Pirates of the Canadian Football League, which was undergoing US expansion at the time. In the late 1990s, the stadium capacity was expanded from approximately 40,000 to 50,832. In 2005, to meet accommodations of the upcoming Independence Bowl in 2006, the stadium went through a renovation to extend the capacity from 52,000 to 59,000. Then in 2008, the City of Shreveport created an entire new section of the stadium. This portion would allow the stadium capacity to be expanded only if need be. This expanse put the total capacity at 63,000. This was part of a grander upgrading plan that improved all aspects of the facility, from concourses to playing surface.

Independence Stadium was considered as a possible playing site for the New Orleans Saints during the 2005 National Football League season due to Hurricane Katrina, but Shreveport eventually lost out to the Alamodome in San Antonio, Texas, and Louisiana State University's Tiger Stadium in Baton Rouge. However, Independence Stadium eventually was chosen to host the Saints' first preseason home game for the 2006 season while the Louisiana Superdome prepared for its grand re-opening. Field Turf was installed on the stadium's playing surface in 2010. In 2010, a Texas UIL playoff game was played featuring Mesquite Horn HS and the technical host Longview. Longview won, 28–14. In 2011, Independence Stadium hosted the Port City Classic, an NCAA college football competition between Louisiana Tech University of Ruston, Louisiana, and Grambling State University of Grambling, Louisiana. The south end zone of the stadium borders Interstate 20.

== Game results ==
Rankings are based on the AP Poll prior to the game being played.

Date	Winning Team		Losing Team		Attendance	Notes
December 13, 1976	McNeese State	20	Tulsa	16	19,164	notes
December 17, 1977	Louisiana Tech	24	Louisville	14	22,223	notes
December 16, 1978	East Carolina	35	Louisiana Tech	13	31,054	notes
December 15, 1979	Syracuse	31	McNeese State	7	27,234	notes
December 13, 1980	Southern Miss	16	McNeese State	14	42,600	notes
December 12, 1981	Texas A&M	33	Oklahoma State	16	48,600	notes
December 11, 1982	Wisconsin	14	Kansas State	3	46,244	notes
December 10, 1983	16 Air Force	9	Ole Miss	3	41,274	notes
December 15, 1984	Air Force	23	Virginia Tech	7	45,034	notes
December 21, 1985	Minnesota	20	Clemson	13	42,845	notes
December 20, 1986	Ole Miss	20	Texas Tech	17	46,369	notes
December 19, 1987	Washington	24	Tulane	12	44,683	notes
December 23, 1988	Southern Miss	38	UTEP	18	20,242	notes
December 16, 1989	Oregon	27	Tulsa	24	44,621	notes
December 15, 1990	Louisiana Tech	34	Maryland	34	48,325	notes
December 29, 1991	24 Georgia	24	Arkansas	15	46,932	notes
December 31, 1992	Wake Forest	39	Oregon	35	31,337	notes
December 31, 1993	22 Virginia Tech	45	21 Indiana	20	33,819	notes
December 28, 1994	18 Virginia	20	TCU	10	36,192	notes
December 29, 1995	LSU	45	Michigan State	26	48,835	notes
December 31, 1996	Auburn	32	24 Army	29	41,366	notes
December 28, 1997	15 LSU	27	Notre Dame	9	50,459	notes
December 31, 1998	Ole Miss	35	Texas Tech	18	46,862	notes
December 31, 1999	Ole Miss	27	Oklahoma	25	49,873	notes
December 31, 2000	Mississippi State	43	Texas A&M	41 (OT)	36,974	notes
December 27, 2001	Alabama	14	Iowa State	13	45,627	notes
December 27, 2002	Ole Miss	27	Nebraska	23	46,096	notes
December 31, 2003	Arkansas	27	Missouri	14	49,625	notes
December 28, 2004	Iowa State	17	Miami (Ohio)	13	43,076	notes
December 30, 2005	Missouri	38	South Carolina	31	41,332	notes
December 28, 2006	Oklahoma State	34	Alabama	31	45,054	notes
December 30, 2007	Alabama	30	Colorado	24	47,043	notes
December 28, 2008	Louisiana Tech	17	Northern Illinois	10	41,567	notes
December 28, 2009	Georgia	44	Texas A&M	20	49,654	notes
December 27, 2010	Air Force	14	Georgia Tech	7	39,632	notes
December 26, 2011	Missouri	41	North Carolina	24	41,728	notes
December 28, 2012	Ohio	45	Louisiana–Monroe	14	41,853	notes
December 31, 2013	Arizona	42	Boston College	19	36,917	notes
December 27, 2014	South Carolina	24	Miami (FL)	21	38,242	notes
December 26, 2015	Virginia Tech	55	Tulsa	52	31,289	notes
December 26, 2016	NC State	41	Vanderbilt	17	28,995	notes
December 27, 2017	Florida State	42	Southern Miss	13	33,601	notes
December 27, 2018	Duke	56	Temple	27	27,492	notes
December 26, 2019	Louisiana Tech	14	Miami (FL)	0	33,129	notes
December 26, 2020	Canceled				–	
December 18, 2021	UAB	31	12 BYU	28	26,276	notes
December 23, 2022	Houston	23	Louisiana	16	23,410	notes
December 16, 2023	Texas Tech	34	California	14	33,071	notes
December 28, 2024	19 Army	27	Louisiana Tech	6	34,283	notes
December 30, 2025	Louisiana Tech	23	Coastal Carolina	14	30,298	notes

== MVPs ==
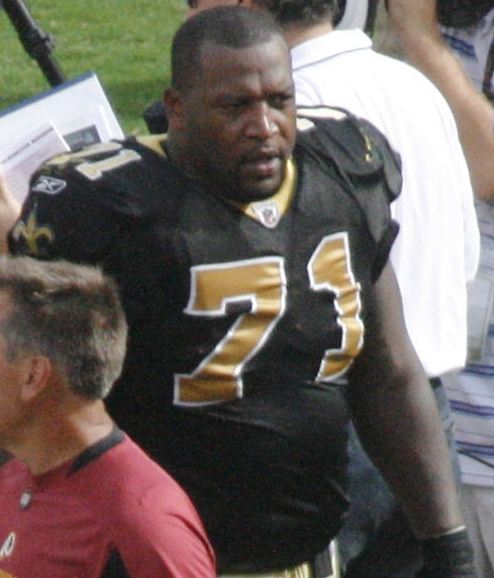
1998 defensive MVP Kendrick Clancy

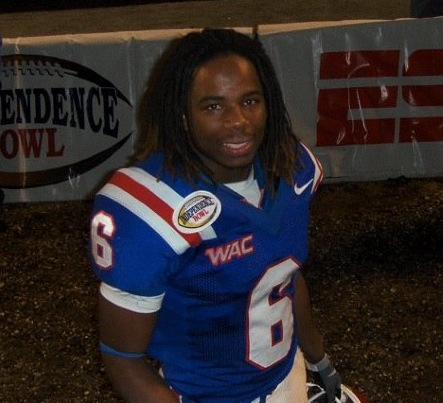
2008 offensive MVP Phillip Livas

The bowl names both an offensive and defensive player of the game; on several occasions, the award has been shared.

Year	Offensive MVP			Defensive MVP		
Year	Player	Team	Position	Player	Team	Position
1976	Terry McFarland	McNeese State	QB	Terry Clark	Tulsa	CB
1977	Keith Thibodeaux	Louisiana Tech	QB	Otis Wilson	Louisville	LB
1978	Theodore Sutton	East Carolina	FB	Zack Valentine	East Carolina	DE
1979	Joe Morris	Syracuse	RB	Clay Carroll	McNeese State	DT
1980	Will Varner	McNeese State	QB	Jearld Baylis	Southern Miss	NG
1981	Gary Kubiak	Texas A&M	QB	Mike Green	Oklahoma State	LB
1982	Randy Wright	Wisconsin	QB	Tim Krumrie	Wisconsin	NG
1983	Marty Louthan	Air Force	QB	Andre Townsend	Ole Miss	DT
1984	Bart Weiss	Air Force	QB	Scott Thomas	Air Force	S
1985	Rickey Foggie	Minnesota	QB	Bruce Holmes	Minnesota	LB
1986	Mark Young	Ole Miss	QB	James Mosley	Texas Tech	DE
1987	Chris Chandler	Washington	QB	David Rill	Washington	LB
1988	James Henry	Southern Miss	PR	James Henry	Southern Miss	CB
1989	Bill Musgrave	Oregon	QB	Chris Oldham	Oregon	DB
1990	Mike Richardson	Louisiana Tech	RB	Lorenza Baker	Louisiana Tech	LB
1991	Andre Hastings	Georgia	FL	Torray Evans	Georgia	LB
1992	Todd Dixon	Wake Forest	SE	Herman O'Berry	Oregon	CB
1993	Maurice DeShazo	Virginia Tech	QB	Antonio Banks	Virginia Tech	CB
1994	Mike Groh	Virginia	QB	Mike Frederick	Virginia	DE
1995	Kevin Faulk	LSU	RB	Gabe Northern	LSU	DE
1996	Dameyune Craig	Auburn	QB	Takeo Spikes	Auburn	LB
1996	Dameyune Craig	Auburn	QB	Rickey Neal	Auburn	LB
1997	Rondell Mealey	LSU	RB	Arnold Miller	LSU	DE
1998	Romaro Miller	Ole Miss	QB	Kendrick Clancy	Ole Miss	DL
1999	Josh Heupel	Oklahoma	QB	Tim Strickland	Ole Miss	CB
2000	Ja'Mar Toombs	Texas A&M	RB	Willie Blade	Mississippi State	DT
2001	Seneca Wallace	Iowa State	QB	Matt Word	Iowa State	LB
2001	Seneca Wallace	Iowa State	QB	Waine Bacon	Alabama	S
2002	Eli Manning	Ole Miss	QB	Chris Kelsay	Nebraska	DE
2003	Cedric Cobbs	Arkansas	RB	Caleb Miller	Arkansas	LB
2004	Bret Meyer	Iowa State	QB	Nick Moser	Iowa State	DB
2005	Brad Smith	Missouri	QB	Marcus King	Missouri	CB
2006	Dantrell Savage	Oklahoma State	RB	Jeremy Nethon	Oklahoma State	LB
2007	John Parker Wilson	Alabama	QB	Wallace Gilberry	Alabama	DE
2008	Phillip Livas	Louisiana Tech	WR	Weldon Brown	Louisiana Tech	CB
2009	Aron White	Georgia	TE	Geno Atkins	Georgia	DL
2010	Jared Tew	Air Force	RB	Rick Ricketts	Air Force	DT
2011	James Franklin	Missouri	QB	Andrew Wilson	Missouri	LB
2012	Tyler Tettleton	Ohio	QB	Keith Moore	Ohio	LB
2012	Beau Blankenship	Ohio	RB	Keith Moore	Ohio	LB
2013	BJ Denker	Arizona	QB	William Parks	Arizona	S
2014	Pharoh Cooper	South Carolina	WR	Skai Moore	South Carolina	LB
2015	Isaiah Ford	Virginia Tech	WR	Jeremy Brady	Tulsa	S
2016	Jaylen Samuels	NC State	FB	Airius Moore	NC State	LB
2017	James Blackman	Florida State	QB	Nate Andrews	Florida State	DB
2018	Daniel Jones	Duke	QB	Delvon Randall	Temple	DB
2019	Justin Henderson	Louisiana Tech	RB	Connor Taylor	Louisiana Tech	LB
2021	Tyler Allgeier	BYU	RB	Tyler Batty	BYU	DE
2022	Clayton Tune	Houston	QB	Art Green	Houston	DB
2023	Behren Morton	Texas Tech	QB	Jacob Rodriguez	Texas Tech	LB
2024	Bryson Daily	Army	QB	Calib Fortner	Army	LB
2025	Trey Kukuk	Louisiana Tech	QB	Sifa Leota	Louisiana Tech	LB

== Most appearances ==
Every current member of the SEC except Florida, Kentucky, Tennessee and Texas has appeared in the game. Of the 21 current or former members of the Big 12, only Arizona State, Baylor, Cincinnati, Kansas, Texas, UCF, Utah and West Virginia have yet to appear in the game. With the appearance of Duke in the 2018 game, every current or former member of the ACC except Pittsburgh, SMU and Stanford have appeared.

Updated through the December 2025 edition (49 games, 98 total appearances).

Teams with multiple appearances

Rank	Team	Appearances	Record	Win pct.
1	Louisiana Tech	7	4–2–1	.643
2	Ole Miss	5	4–1	.800
3	Air Force	3	3–0	1.000
3	Alabama	3	2–1	.667
3	Missouri	3	2–1	.667
3	Southern Miss	3	2–1	.667
3	Virginia Tech	3	2–1	.667
3	McNeese State	3	1–2	.333
3	Texas A&M	3	1–2	.333
3	Texas Tech	3	1–2	.333
3	Tulsa	3	0–3	.000
12	Georgia	2	2–0	1.000
12	LSU	2	2–0	1.000
12	Arkansas	2	1–1	.500
12	Iowa State	2	1–1	.500
12	Oklahoma State	2	1–1	.500
12	Oregon	2	1–1	.500
12	South Carolina	2	1–1	.500
12	Army	2	1–1	.500
12	Miami (FL)	2	0–2	.000

Teams with a single appearance

Won (16): Arizona, Auburn, Duke, East Carolina, Florida State, Houston, Minnesota, Mississippi State, NC State, Ohio, Syracuse, UAB, Virginia, Wake Forest, Washington, Wisconsin
Lost (24): Boston College, BYU, California, Clemson, Coastal Carolina, Colorado, Georgia Tech, Indiana, Kansas State, Louisiana, Louisiana–Monroe, Louisville, Miami (OH), Michigan State, Nebraska, North Carolina, Northern Illinois, Notre Dame, Oklahoma, TCU, Temple, Tulane, UTEP, Vanderbilt
Tied (1): Maryland

== Appearances by conference ==
Updated through the December 2025 edition (49 games, 98 total appearances).

Conference	Record					Appearances by season		
Conference	Games	W	L	T	Win pct.	Won	Lost	Tied
SEC	18	14	4	0	.778	1986, 1991, 1995, 1996, 1997, 1998, 1999, 2000, 2001, 2002, 2003, 2007, 2009, 2014	1983, 2005, 2006, 2016	
ACC	13	6	6	1	.500	1992, 1994, 2015, 2016, 2017, 2018	1985, 2010, 2011, 2013, 2014, 2019	1990
Big 12	13	5	8	0	.385	2004, 2005, 2006, 2011, 2023	1998, 1999, 2000, 2001, 2002, 2003, 2007, 2009	
Independents	12	4	7	1	.375	1978, 1979, 1980, 1988	1977, 1984, 1987, 1989, 1996, 1997, 2021	1990
Pac-12	5	3	2	0	.600	1987, 1989, 2013	1992, 2023	
American	5	3	2	0	.600	1993, 2022, 2024	2015, 2018	
CUSA	5	3	2	0	.600	2019, 2021, 2025	2017, 2024	
Southland	5	2	3	0	.400	1976, 1977	1978, 1979, 1980	
WAC	4	3	1	0	.750	1983, 1984, 2008	1988	
Big Ten	4	2	2	0	.500	1982, 1985	1993, 1995	
SWC	4	1	3	0	.250	1981	1986, 1991, 1994	
MAC	3	1	2	0	.333	2012	2004, 2008	
Sun Belt	3	0	3	0	.000		2012, 2022, 2025	
Big Eight	2	0	2	0	.000		1981, 1982	
Mountain West	1	1	0	0	1.000	2010		
Missouri Valley	1	0	1	0	.000		1976	

- Conferences that are defunct or no longer active in FBS are marked in italics.
- The record of the American Conference includes the 1993 appearance of Virginia Tech, at the time a member of the Big East, as the American retains the conference charter following the 2013 split of the original Big East along football lines.
- The Pac-12's record includes appearances from when the conference was the Pac-10.
- Independent appearances: Louisville (1977), East Carolina (1978), Syracuse (1979), Southern Miss (1980, 1988), Virginia Tech (1984), Tulane (1987), Tulsa (1989), Louisiana Tech (1990), Army (1996), Notre Dame (1997), BYU (2021)

== Game records ==
Team	Record, Team vs. Opponent	Year
Most points (one team)	56, Duke vs. Temple	2018
Most points (both teams)	107, Virginia Tech (55) vs. Tulsa (52)	2015
Most points (losing team)	52, Tulsa vs. Virginia Tech	2015
Fewest points allowed	0, Louisiana Tech vs. Miami (FL)	2019
Largest margin of victory	31, Ohio vs. Louisiana–Monroe	2012
Total yards	598, Virginia Tech vs. Tulsa	2015
Rushing yards	337, Missouri vs. North Carolina	2011
Passing yards	440, Duke vs. Temple	2018
First downs	30, Virginia Tech vs. Tulsa	2015
Fewest yards allowed	161, Louisiana Tech vs. Louisville	1977
Fewest rushing yards allowed	12, East Carolina vs. Louisiana Tech	1978
Fewest passing yards allowed	41, Air Force vs. Georgia Tech	2010
Individual	Record, Player, Team vs. Opponent	Year
All-purpose yards	286, T.J. Rahming (Duke)	2018
Touchdowns (all-purpose)	4, Beau Blankenship (Ohio)	2012
Rushing yards	234, Kevin Faulk (LSU)	1995
Rushing touchdowns	4, Beau Blankenship (Ohio)	2012
Passing yards	423, Daniel Jones (Duke)	2018
Passing touchdowns	5, Daniel Jones (Duke)	2018
Receiving yards	240, T.J. Rahming (Duke)	2018
Receiving touchdowns	3, shared by: Jaylen Samuels (NC State); Auden Tate (Florida State)	2016; 2017
Tackles	24, Clay Carroll (McNeese State)	1979
Sacks	3, most recently: Amier Washington (Texas Tech)	2023
Interceptions	2, most recently: Anthony Magee (Ole Miss)	1998
Long plays	Record, Player, Team vs. Opponent	Year
Touchdown run	80 yds., Deuce McAllister (Ole Miss)	1999
Touchdown pass	87 yds., Randy Wright to Tim Stracka (Wisconsin)	1982
Kickoff return	100 yds., shared by: Derrick Mason (Michigan State); Nyheim Hines (NC State)	1995; 2016
Punt return	86 yds., Javier Arenas (Alabama)	2006
Interception return	99 yds., Marcus King (Missouri)	2005
Fumble return	37 yds., Gabe Northern (LSU)	1995
Punt	70 yds., Jeff Dozier (Louisiana Tech)	1978
Field goal	52 yds., Tommy Openshaw (Vanderbilt)	2016

== Media coverage ==
The bowl was first broadcast nationally in 1979, by WTBS. It has subsequently been broadcast by Mizlou (1980–1990), ABC (1991), and ESPN or ESPN2 since then, with the exception of a one-year return to ABC in 2014.
