= Responsible Investment Brand Index =

Scale to evaluate the European asset management industry

Responsible Investment Brand Index (RIBI)
- Author: Jean-Francois Hirschel and Markus Kramer
- Language: English
- Release number: Eighth edition (2026)
- Subject: Asset Management
- Publisher: Hirschel & Kramer
- Publication place: Switzerland
- Website: ri-brandindex.org

The Responsible Investment Brand Index (RIBI) is a scale to evaluate the global asset management industry on its ability to demonstrate its commitment to sustainable investment into their respective brands. The annual index was created in 2018 by Jean-Francois Hirschel and Markus Kramer.

== Methodology ==
The RIBI universe is based on the global asset managers listed in Investment & Pensions Europe IPE 500 ranking and analyses over 300 publicly available data points. The 2026 edition covered 632 asset managers. The Index evaluates asset managers on two key dimensions: the Commitment rating, focusing on hard factors (e.g. the level and quality of listed equity voting), and the Brand rating, evaluating soft factors (e.g. the existence of a Purpose statement and the quality of the latter). Each of these two ratings ranges from 0 (poor) to 5 (excellent).

== Results ==
The eighth edition of the index was published on 29 April 2026 and evaluated 632 asset managers worldwide. It found that 22% of the firms assessed qualified as Avant-Gardists, up from 20% in the 2025 edition, while the proportion classified as Laggards fell from 46% to 41%. Traditionalists accounted for 26% and Aspirants for 11%.

The 2026 global top ten was led by DPAM, Pictet Asset Management and CANDRIAM, followed by Nordea Asset Management, Amundi and Mirova. Danske Bank Asset Management, Manulife Investment Management, RBC Global Asset Management and the Spanish boutique Suma Capital entered the top ten for the first time, displacing UBS, Robeco, Triodos, WHEB and Nuveen. With the departure of Nuveen, which had been the only US-headquartered firm in the 2025 ranking, no US manager appeared in the 2026 global top ten.

At country level, France replaced Japan at the top of the ranking, recording a Commitment rating of 3.80 and a Brand rating of 2.39 against global averages of 2.31 and 1.76 respectively. 52% of the French firms assessed were classified as Avant-Gardists, more than double the global proportion. Japan retained the lowest share of Laggards of any country, at 9%. Germany remained the weakest European market, with 10% of firms classified as Avant-Gardists. Southern Europe recorded the largest regional improvement, with its overall score rising 17% and the strongest brand rating of any region, and became the second best rated region in Europe after France. Benelux, which had placed first or second in every previous edition, fell to third following a decline in its brand rating.

The United States, which accounted for 233 of the firms assessed and 63% of the assets under management covered by the index, recorded a Commitment rating of 1.53, the lowest of any developed country, with 62% of US managers classified as Laggards. The United Kingdom fell below the global average on the Brand dimension while remaining above it on Commitment, and the Asia-Pacific region remained ahead of North America, though by a narrower margin than in 2025. Across the universe, 53% of managers articulated an organizational purpose and 48% differentiated themselves through at least one stated value or belief.

By market segment, scores rose most sharply among boutique and mid-tier managers. Private asset managers improved their overall score by 15%, and real estate managers raised their Commitment rating by 29% year on year.

== Significance ==
The index is cited in asset management trade coverage as a measure of the consistency between managers' stated responsible investment commitments and their brand positioning. Firms placed in the Avant-Gardist category or in one of the index's regional, national and segment rankings frequently reference the result in their own communications.

Commentators have also noted the limits of the method. Reviewing the 2026 edition, the Swiss financial publication Finews observed that basing the Commitment rating on Principles for Responsible Investment transparency reports treats PRI membership as an implicit mark of quality, and that the Brand rating rests on formalized criteria such as whether a purpose statement is short or begins with a verb. It nevertheless described the index as a distinctive quantitative instrument in the absence of a comparable alternative.
