= Naïm Abou-Jaoudé =

French businessman (born 1966)

- Born: July 9, 1966 (age 60)
- Occupation: CEO of New York Life Investments (2023 – present) President of EFAMA (2021 – present)

Naïm Abou-Jaoudé, born on 9 July 1966 in Jal-El-Dib (Lebanon), is the Chief Executive Officer (CEO) of New York Life Investment Management (NYLIM).

NYLIM, a multi-boutique third-party asset management business, is part of New York Life Investments (NYLI), which oversees more than $800 billion in assets. NYLI serves as the global investment manager branch of New York Life.

== Early life and education ==
Abou-Jaoudé spent his early years in Lebanon before emigrating to Paris, France in 1978. He earned a graduate degree at the Institute of Political Studies in Paris (IEP-Sciences Po) and holds a master's degree in Economics and Finance from Université Paris II – Panthéon Assas.

== Career ==
Abou-Jaoudé has spent his entire career in finance, more particularly in asset management, covering Continental Europe, the UK, the Middle East, the USA and in Asia-Pacific. He started his career in 1990 at Transoptions Finance, a subsidiary of Crédit Agricole.

Between 1996 and 1999, he oversaw the investment management equities and derivatives department at Alfi Gestion and UBS Asset Management France; the company that was acquired by Dexia Asset Management in 1995.

From 2000 to 2006, he served as chief investment officer (CIO) for alternative investments and a member of the executive committee of Dexia Asset Management.

In 2007, he held the positions of member of the executive committee of Dexia SA and chairman of the executive committee of Dexia Asset Management, and was named chief executive officer (CEO) of Dexia Asset Management.

Abou-Jaoudé was one of the key actors to lead the company through the 2008 financial industry turmoil. He also steered the acquisition of Dexia Asset Management by New York Life Investments, which was announced in February 2014. Dexia Asset Management then became a New York Life company and changed its name to "Candriam Investors Group", which stands for 'Conviction and Responsibility In Asset Management'.

In September 2015, next to his role as CEO of Candriam, he was appointed Chairman of New York Life Investment Management International, responsible for the activities and development of New York Life Investments' global business outside the USA.

Under the leadership of Abou-Jaoudé, Candriam diversified its positioning through three main acquisitions: a majority stake in London-based private equity real estate manager Tristan Capital Partners, the integration of ABN Amro Investment Management's Paris-based direct investment management teams to Candriam, and the acquisition of a minority stake in Kartesia, a European private debt specialist.

Abou-Jaoudé has actively worked to bridge the ESG knowledge gap in the finance industry. In 2017, he led the development of the CANDRIAM Academy, a global educational resource for sustainable investing. The Academy aims to help investors better understand how to analyze, identify, and evaluate sustainable investments. Furthering his commitment to education on ESG, Naïm also fostered partnerships between Candriam and top-tier academic institutions across the world. These include Columbia University (US), the London School of Economics (UK), Imperial College (UK), Ecole Polytechnique (France), KEDGE Business School (France), UCLouvain (Belgium), and LUMSA (Italy).

In June 2021, Naïm was elected President of the European Fund and Asset Management Association (EFAMA), which is the voice of the EUR 27tn European investment management industry.

In 2023, Abou-Jaoudé became the CEO of New York Life Investment Management (NYLIM), the parent company of Candriam.
