= New York Life Insurance Company =

American life insurance company

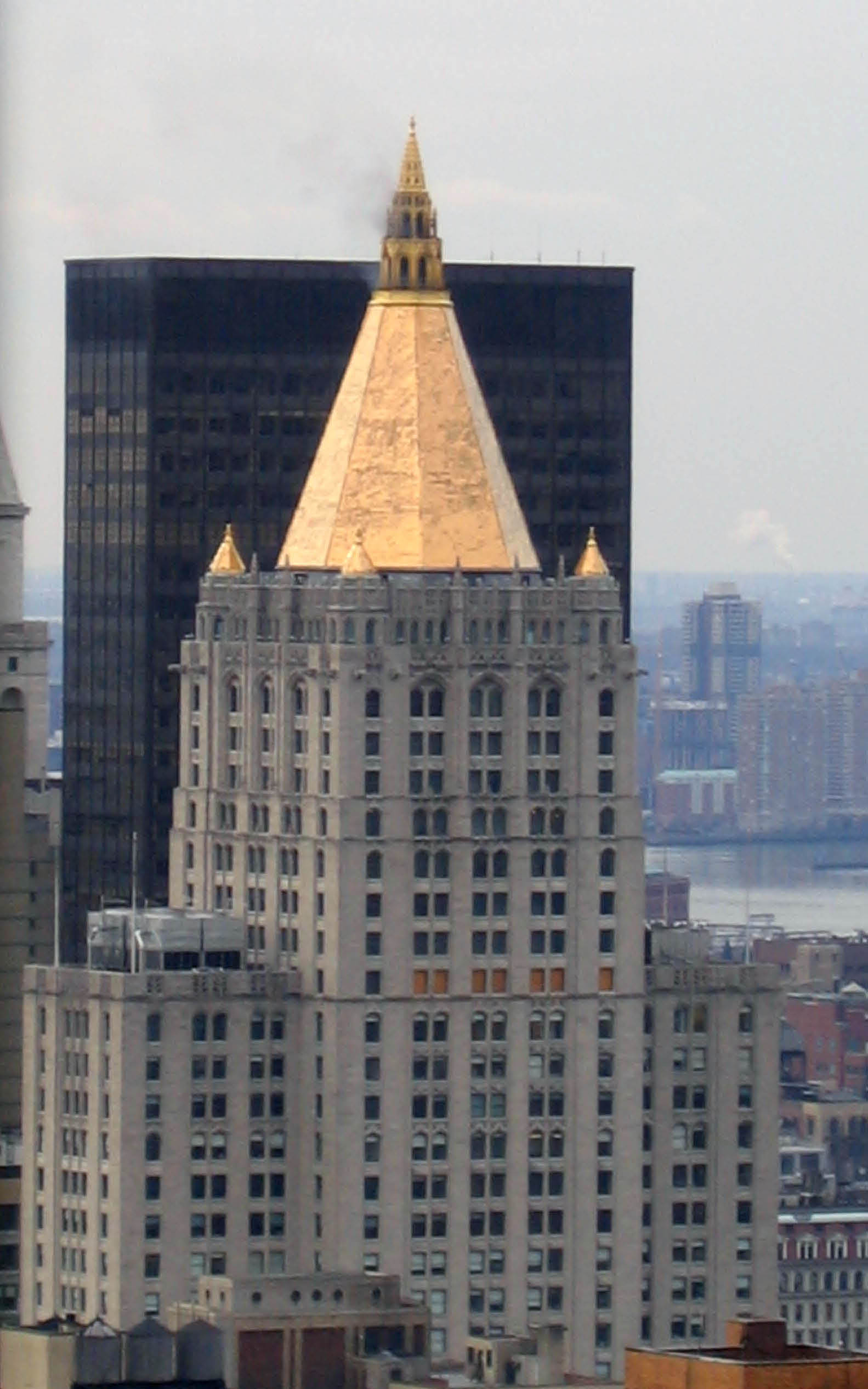
- Headquarters at the New York Life Building
- Type: Private
- Industry: Insurance: life and annuity
- Founded: 1845; 181 years ago in New York City, U.S.
- Headquarters: New York Life Building, New York City, U.S.
- Key people: Craig DeSanto (CEO, chair)
- Products: Life insurance, annuities, long-term care insurance, asset management
- Revenue: ▲US$ 27.19 billion (2024)
- Net income: ▲US$470 million (2024)
- Total assets: ▲US$244.90 billion (2024)
- Total equity: ▲US$26.43 billion (2024)
- Number of employees: 15,384 (2023)
- Subsidiaries: New York Life Investments
- Website: newyorklife.com

New York Life Insurance Company (NYLIC), most commonly known as New York Life, is the second-largest life insurance company and the largest mutual life insurance company in the United States, and is ranked #69 on the 2025 Fortune 500 list of the largest U.S. corporations by total revenue. In 2025, NYLIC achieved the best possible ratings by the four independent rating companies (Standard & Poor's, AM Best, Moody's and Fitch Ratings). Other New York Life affiliates provide an array of securities products and services, as well as institutional and retail mutual funds.

== History ==
=== Early history ===
Advertisement from Shole's Directory of the City of Macon, December 1st, 1894.

New York Life Insurance Company first opened in Manhattan's Financial District as Nautilus Mutual Life in 1841, 10 years after the first life insurance charter was granted in the United States. Originally chartered in 1841, the company also sold fire and marine insurance. The company's first president, James De Peyster Ogden, was appointed in 1845. Nautilus renamed itself New York Life Insurance Company in 1845 to concentrate on its life insurance business.

In its early years (1846–1848) the company, along with other insurance companies of the day including Aetna and US Life, insured the lives of slaves for their owners. By 1847 these accounted for one‑third of New York Life's policies. The board of trustees voted to end the sale of insurance policies on slaves in 1848. The company also sold policies to soldiers and civilians involved in combat during the American Civil War and paid claims under a flag of truce during that time. In the late 1800s, the company began employing female agents.

New York Life continued to grow throughout its first 100 years as the national population and the market for life insurance increased. New York Life's growth was in part fueled by its introduction of a system by which the company used agents to find new business. In 1892, company President John A. McCall introduced the branch office system: offices that served as liaisons between New York and field agents.

In 1894, the company became the first US-based insurance provider to offer life insurance to women at the same cost as men; social reformer Susan B. Anthony was one of the company's first female policyholders. In 1896, New York Life became the first company to insure people with disabilities or in hazardous occupations.

=== 20th century ===
President McCall was forced to resign in the wake of the Armstrong investigation, which found that New York Life (among other insurance companies) had made extensive use of bribes to secure favorable legislation. He was replaced by Alexander Ector Orr in 1906. The New York Life Building at 51 Madison Avenue in Manhattan, designed by American architect Cass Gilbert, opened in December 1928. The company moved into the 34-story skyscraper in 1929. Later that year, New York Life's assets survived the stock market crash; state regulation and company investing policy had led New York Life to invest in government bonds and real estate, not common stocks.

Following World War II, New York Life further diversified; it invested in real estate development in the late 1940s and launched a mortgage-loan program for veterans in 1946. In 1957, New York Life hired one of the industry's first black agents, Cirilo McSween. In the 1970s, New York Life began selling annuities and mutual funds. In the late 1990s and early 2000s, as other mutual life insurance companies became publicly traded corporations, New York Life remained a mutual company. New York Life entered the Mexican market in 1999 when it acquired Seguros Monterrey from Aetna.

=== Recent history ===
New York Life, along with other insurance companies, relaxed the claims process for missing persons in the wake of the September 11 attacks. Fearful of the stability of the market during the two years prior to the 2008 financial crisis, New York Life moved its cash into other investments such as treasury bonds. During the 2008 financial crisis, New York Life Insurance Company rejected assistance from the U.S. Treasury Department.

Following the 2013 acquisition of Dexia Asset Management, later renamed Candriam Investors Group, New York Life Investments became one of the largest asset managers worldwide, with access to markets in Europe, Asia and Australia, in addition to the United States.

NYLIC acquired a unit of The Cigna Group's business in 2020 that sold non-health insurance products for US$6.3 billion. The unit became New York Life Group Benefit Solutions. In November 2021, the company announced that company president Craig DeSanto was replacing CEO Ted Mathas. The transition was finalized in April 2022, and Mathas stayed with the company as a non-executive chairman until DeSanto assumed the role of chairman in April 2023.

== Operations ==
As of 2024, New York Life Insurance Company was the country's second-largest life insurance company. As a mutual life insurer, New York Life is owned by its policyholders and has no outside shareholders. In 2024, New York Life reported approximately $27 billion in revenue and $470 million in net income. That year, it had approximately $245 billion in total assets and $26 billion in total equity. New York Life has 12,000 agents and advisors, as of 2025. As a mutual life insurer, New York Life distributes a portion of its earnings to eligible policyholders as annual dividends. As of 2025, the company has paid a dividend every year since 1854.

=== Products and services ===
New York Life's core product is whole life insurance, a type of life insurance offering lifelong protection that builds cash value over time. The insurance businesses portfolio includes: Institutional Life, Institutional Annuities, New York Life Direct, New York Life Group Benefit Solutions, Group Membership Association Department, and Seguros Monterrey New York Life. New York Life also sells term life insurance, universal life insurance, variable universal life insurance, long-term care insurance, annuities and disability insurance. The company provides advisory services and consultation for wealth management, financial planning, income protection, retirement planning, estate planning, and business planning.

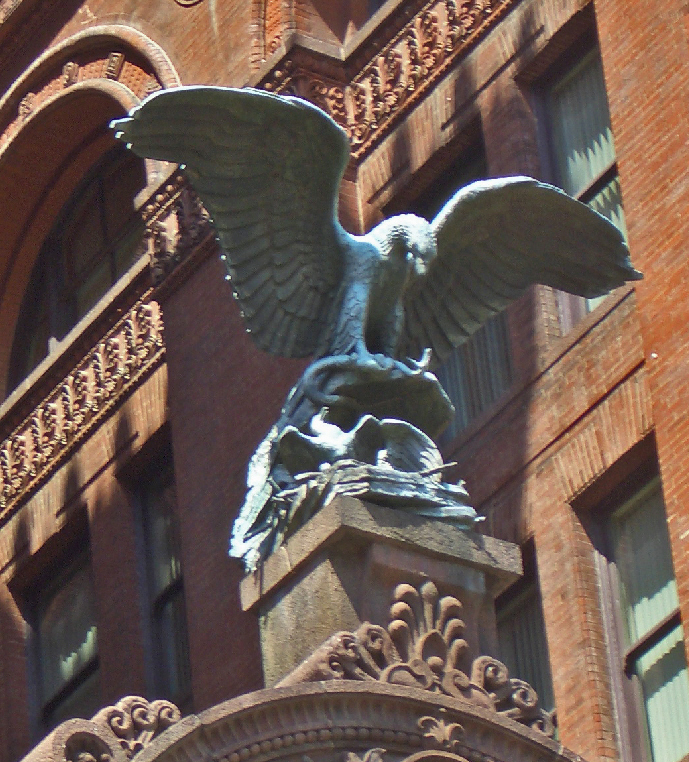
New York Life Building, Kansas City

=== Asset management and investment ===
New York Life Investments is a subsidiary global asset management business which serves both institutional and retail clients. New York Life Ventures launched in 2012. It is the corporate venture capital business of New York Life. Investments have included startup technology companies. The group manages money through independent investment boutiques. These affiliated boutiques include:

- Apogem, a private equity formed by the merger of GoldPoint Partners, Madison Capital Funding, and PA Capital
- Ausbil, an Australian investment boutique specializing in equities
- Candriam Investors Group, which focuses on high yield, absolute return, emerging debt, sustainable investments and asset allocation strategies
- Credit Value Partners, which specializes in opportunistic, distressed debt and high-yield corporate credit
- GoldPoint Partners, a private equity firm
- IndexIQ, which specializes in exchange-traded funds and alternative investment strategies
- MacKay Shields, an asset management firm that focuses on income generation and offers capital growth through mutual and hedge funds
- Madison Capital Funding, which provides financing to private equity firms
- Private Advisors, an asset manager specializing in hedge funds and private equity funds

== Charitable efforts ==
New York Life Foundation is the insurance company's philanthropic arm. The Foundation was established in 1979 and primarily supports programs that benefit young people, particularly childhood bereavement support. It first became involved in childhood bereavement programs when it supported the Comfort Zone Camp in 2007. The Foundation's partners and programs include the National Alliance of Grieving Children, Grief Reach, Coalition to Support Grieving Students, Camp Erin/Moyer Foundation, Tragedy Assistance Program for Survivors and Boys and Girls Clubs of America. The Foundation also funds the Grief-Sensitive Schools Initiative, which provides resources to aid schools in supporting grieving students, as well as Sesame Workshop's "Growing as We Grieve" grief toolkit, which won Webby and Anthem awards in 2024.

The company also emphasizes giving to various cultural communities, including the African-American community. The company also funded a $10 million endowment to the Colin Powell Center for Policy Studies at the City College of New York called the New York Life Endowment for Emerging African-American Issues in 2006.

== Ratings and rankings ==
In 2025 Fortune named New York Life among its Most Admired Companies in the life insurance industry. Forbes ranked New York Life #364 among America's Best Employers for 2017. As of 2025, New York Life ranks No. 69 on the Fortune 500.

By the end of 2025, New York Life had earned the highest financial strength ratings from major four rating agencies: A++ from A.M.Best, AAA from Fitch Ratings, Aaa from Moody and AA+ from Standard & Poor's.
