= New York Life Investments =

U.S. investment management company based in Jersey City, New Jersey

New York Life Investment Management
- Type: Private
- Industry: Investment Management
- Founded: 1986; 40 years ago
- Headquarters: New York, New York, U.S.
- Key people: Naïm Abou-Jaoudé (CEO)
- Products: Asset Management
- AUM: US$800 billion (2025)
- Parent: New York Life Insurance Company
- Website: www.nylim.com

New York Life Investment Management is the brand name and service mark used to discuss the global asset management business of New York Life Insurance Company and that encompasses the following investment advisors: Ausbil Investment Management, Candrium, Kartesia, MacKay Shields, New York Life Investment Management LLC, NYL Investors, and Tristan Capital Partners. New York Life Insurance Company is the largest mutual life-insurance company in the United States, and one of the largest life insurers in the world, ranking #69 on the 2025 Fortune 500 list.

New York Life Investment Management offers investors access to institutional money management through its mutual funds, exchange-traded funds (ETFs), separately managed accounts, and non-traditional strategies. The firm takes an active management approach to its investment solutions, serving both the general account of New York Life Insurance as well as third-party clients. New York Life Investment Management has over $800 billion USD in assets under management as of 2025.

== History ==
Founded in 1986, New York Life Investments provides investment advisory services to financial advisors and their clients. An independent subsidiary of New York Life Insurance Company, over the years New York Life Investments has added to its boutique of investment advisors. This includes MacKay Shields (acquired by New York Life in 1984), Markston International, LLC (1999), New York Life Fixed Income Advisors (2004), Winslow Capital Management (2005), Epoch Investment Partners (2006), MacKay Municipal Managers (2009), Cornerstone Capital Management (2013), Cushing Asset Management (2014), and IndexIQ (2015).

The Mainstay brand was launched in 1986 shortly after MacKay Shields, first offered to retail and then to institutional investors in 1991.

In 2015, the acquisition of IndexIQ introduced liquid alternative investment exchange-traded funds to its product offerings. In June 2024, New York Life announced that its Mainstay and IndexIQ funds would be renamed to reflect the New York Life brand, with the names of funds beginning with NYLI.

Together with sister New York Life subsidiary Candriam, New York Life Investments Alternatives acquired a one-third ownership stake in Kartesia Management in late 2020. Candriam was identified as a subsidiary of New York Life Investments in December 2024, with.Kartesia, Apogem Capital and European real estate manager Tristan Capital Partners each noted as affiliated investment teams. That month, New York Life Investments partnered with Candriam to acquire a 40% minority stake in Andera Partners. The company's assets under management were reported at over $750 billion in December 2024.
