= 2000 Independence Bowl =

- “The Snow Bowl”
Mississippi State Bulldogs	Texas A&M Aggies
(7–4)	(7–4)
SEC	Big 12
43	41
Head coach: Jackie Sherrill	Head coach: R. C. Slocum
	1	2	3	4	OT	Total
Mississippi State	0	14	7	14	8	43
Texas A&M	14	6	0	15	6	41
- Date: December 31, 2000
- Season: 2000
- Stadium: Independence Stadium
- Location: Shreveport, Louisiana
- Referee: Clair Gausman (Mtn. West)
- Attendance: 36,974
- Payout: US$2,112,000

United States TV coverage
- Network: ESPN
- Announcers: Mark Jones, Gino Toretta, and Rob Stone

The 2000 Sanford Independence Bowl, part of the NCAA football bowl games, took place on December 31, 2000 at Independence Stadium in Shreveport, Louisiana. The competing teams were the Mississippi State Bulldogs, representing the Southeastern Conference, and the Texas A&M Aggies from the Big 12 Conference.

The game was later referred to as "The Snow Bowl", as a snowstorm (rare for the Shreveport area) began just before kickoff, blanketing the field in powder, and continued throughout the entire game.

Mississippi State won the bowl in overtime, 43–41 against their future SEC rival.

== Scoring summary ==
First Quarter

- A&M- Whitaker 9 run (Kitchens kick) 13:22 A&M 7 MSU 0
- A&M- Toombs 4 run (Kitchens kick) 8:16 A&M 14 MSU 0

Second Quarter

- MSU- Walker 40 run (Westerfield kick) 9:21 A&M 14 MSU 7
- MSU- Miller 5 pass from Madkin (Westerfield kick) :54 A&M 14 MSU 14
- A&M- Ferguson 42 pass from Farris (kick failed) :46 A&M 20 MSU 14

Third Quarter

- MSU- Walker 1 run (Westerfield kick) 11:55 MSU 21 A&M 20

Fourth Quarter

- A&M- Johnson 35 pass from Farris (Whitaker run for two-point conversion) 14:51 A&M 28 MSU 21
- A&M- Toombs 13 run (Kitchens kick) 9:20 A&M 35 MSU 21
- MSU- Walker 32 run (Westerfield kick) 8:17 A&M 35 MSU 28
- MSU- Lee 3 pass from Madkin (Westerfield kick) 1:30 A&M 35 MSU 35

OT

- A&M- Toombs 25 run (kick failed) A&M 41 MSU 35
- MSU- 2 point defensive conversion by Jul Griffith A&M 41 MSU 37
- MSU- Madkin 6 run MSU 43 A&M 41
