= 2008 Independence Bowl =

Louisiana Tech Bulldogs	Northern Illinois Huskies
(7–5)	(6–6)
WAC	MAC
17	10
Head coach: Derek Dooley	Head coach: Jerry Kill
	1	2	3	4	Total
Louisiana Tech	7	7	3	0	17
Northern Illinois	7	0	3	0	10
- Date: December 28, 2008
- Season: 2008
- Stadium: Independence Stadium
- Location: Shreveport, Louisiana
- MVP: WR/KR Phillip Livas, La. Tech (Offensive); CB Weldon Brown, La. Tech (Defensive)
- Referee: David Epperley (C-USA)
- Attendance: 41,567
- Payout: US$1,650,000

United States TV coverage
- Network: ESPN
- Announcers: Pam Ward, Ray Bentley
- Nielsen ratings: 1.00

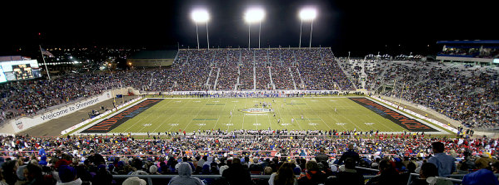
2008 Independence Bowl from midfield

The 2008 Independence Bowl marked the thirty-third edition of the college football bowl game, and was played at Independence Stadium in Shreveport, Louisiana.

== Game summary ==
The game was contested starting on Sunday, December 28, 2008, with a 7:15 p.m. CST kickoff, telecast on ESPN. the contest pitted the 2008 Louisiana Tech Bulldogs football team against the 2008 Northern Illinois Huskies football team. Both Louisiana Tech and Northern Illinois were chosen because both of the contracted conferences – the Big 12 Conference and the Southeastern Conference – failed to produce enough bowl eligible teams as both had a pair of schools in the 2009 Bowl Championship Series. Prior to the game, citing financial difficulties due to the 2008 financial crisis, PetroSun pulled out as title sponsor.

Both participants were football-only members of the Big West Conference in the mid-1990s. This was the 7th football game between Louisiana Tech and Northern Illinois and the first since 1996. Tech now holds a 6–1 edge over Northern Illinois.

The game was Louisiana Tech's 4th appearance in the Independence Bowl and the first appearance since 1990 when Tech tied Maryland 34–34. The Bulldogs now hold an overall record of 2–1–1 in the Independence Bowl. The victory over Northern Illinois marked the first bowl game victory by the Bulldogs since their 1977 Independence Bowl victory over Louisville.

This was Northern Illinois' 1st appearance in the Independence Bowl and the 4th overall appearance in Division I FBS Bowl Games. Their previous appearances in bowl games include the 1983 California Bowl (20–13 victory over Cal State-Fullerton), 2004 Silicon Valley Classic (34–21 victory over Troy), and 2006 Poinsettia Bowl (37–7 loss to TCU).

=== Scoring summary ===
Scoring summary

Quarter	Time	Drive			Team	Scoring information	Score	
Quarter	Time	Plays	Yards	TOP	Team	Scoring information	La. Tech	NIU
1	1:56	11	69	5:50	NIU	Kyle Skarb 8-yard touchdown reception from Chandler Harnish, Mike Salerno kick good	0	7
1	1:43				La. Tech	Phillip Livas 97-yard kickoff return for a touchdown, Brad Oestriecher kick good	7	7
2	13:40	5	42	2:05	La. Tech	Daniel Porter 11-yard touchdown run, Brad Oestriecher kick good	14	7
3	11:54	8	49	3:06	La. Tech	30-yard field goal by Brad Oestriecher	17	7
3	7:31	10	66	4:23	NIU	20-yard field goal by Mike Salerno	17	10
"TOP" = time of possession. For other American football terms, see Glossary of American football.							10	17

=== Statistics ===
	1	2	3	4	Total
Bulldogs	7	7	3	0	17
Huskies	7	0	3	0	10

Statistics	La. Tech	NIU
First Downs	12	17
Total offense, yards	236	339
Rushes-yards (net)	31–92	31–153
Passing yards (net)	144	186
Passes, Comp-Att-Int	12–27–0	20–41–2
Time of possession	26:48	33:12

Team	Category	Player	Statistics
La. Tech	Passing	Ross Jenkins	12/27, 144 yds
La. Tech	Rushing	Daniel Porter	18 car, 78 yds, 1 TD
La. Tech	Receiving	Patrick Jackson	1 rec, 34 yds
NIU	Passing	Chandler Harnish	20/40, 186 yds, 1 TD, 2 INT
NIU	Rushing	Chad Spann	14 car, 79 yds
NIU	Receiving	Matt Simon	6 rec, 44 yds
