= Duck the Halls: A Robertson Family Christmas =

Studio album by The Robertsons
- Released: October 29, 2013
- Genre: Christmas
- Label: UMG Nashville
- Producer: Buddy Cannon

Duck the Halls: A Robertson Family Christmas is the first full-length Christmas album from the cast of A&E reality television series Duck Dynasty, released October 29, 2013, via UMG Nashville.

== Background ==
The announcement of the album came on June 10, 2013, in the Music City Center during the CMA Music Festival in Nashville, Tennessee. It was revealed that Buddy Cannon is producing the album, and that it features the family's "special brand of Southern, down-home sense of humor." CEO of Duck Commander, Willie Robertson, was quoted as saying, "Christmas is an important holiday for us not only because of our strong faith but also our holiday family traditions. We're having a great time making this album. We hope you enjoy it."

== Recording ==
The album features a number of traditional seasonal songs as well as originals written and performed by the Robertsons. Special guests include country stars Luke Bryan, George Strait, Josh Turner and Alison Krauss.

== Release ==
Walmart released an exclusive 'ZinePak deluxe edition of Duck the Halls: A Robertson Family Christmas. The limited-edition package features the full-length album, plus one additional bonus track ("Santa Looked a Lot Like Daddy"), as well as a 64-page magazine with exclusive family interviews, photos, fun facts, holiday recipes, scented Christmas ornament, and gift-tag stickers. Walmart let voters decide between the choice of three covers which one will be on the special release.

== Critical reception ==
Professional ratings
Review scores
| Source | Rating |
|---|---|
| Country Weekly | B+ |
| GotCountryOnline | 3/5 stars |
| Confront Magazine | 4/5 stars |
| Montreal Gazette | 4/5 stars |

Duck the Halls: A Robertson Family Christmas garnered mostly positive reception from music critics. Tammy Ragusa of Country Weekly gave the album a B+ rating and states: "If you're a big fan of the Robertson family from the hit A&E reality series Duck Dynasty (i.e., you buy every piece of merch bearing Willie's or Uncle Si's photo or the expression "Happy, Happy, Happy"), then get your wallet out. You're not going to want to go through this holiday season without Duck the Halls: A Robertson Family Christmas. Writing for Roughstock, Matt Bjorke adds: "It may come off as a bit of a novelty album people who don't follow the program but that doesn't mean it's not a well-made album, which Duck the Halls: A Robertson Family Christmas most definitely is." Daryl Addison of Great American Country writes: "Duck the Halls is a friendly celebration of the season that will have fans of Duck Dynasty asking for seconds."

== Commercial performance ==
The album debuted at number four on the Billboard 200 chart and number one on the Billboard Top Country Albums chart, selling 69,000 copies in its first week of release. The album was behind another holiday album, Kelly Clarkson's Wrapped in Red, which debuted at number three with 70,000 copies. In its second week of release, Duck the Halls remained at number one on the Top Country Albums chart, seeing a slight sales increase to 73,000 copies. The album was certified Platinum by the RIAA on December 11, 2013, and it became the second best-selling Christmas album of 2013 with 745,000 copies sold in the US. As of December 2014, Duck the Halls has sold 807,000 copies in the United States.

== Track listing ==
| No. | Title | Writer(s) | Length |
|---|---|---|---|
| 1. | "Ragin' Cajun Redneck Christmas" (Willie Robertson) | Willie Robertson, Dallas Davidson | 3:27 |
| 2. | "I'll Be Home for Christmas" (Missy Robertson) | Walter Kent, Kim Gannon, Buck Ram | 3:50 |
| 3. | "You're a Mean One, Mr. Grinch" (Si Robertson) | Theodor S. Geisel, Albert Hague | 3:04 |
| 4. | "Christmas Cookies" (Phil Robertson and George Strait with Miss Kay) | Aaron Barker | 3:18 |
| 5. | "Away in a Manger" (Sadie Robertson with Alison Krauss, Luke 2: 8-14 Scripture Reading by Mia) | Traditional | 4:03 |
| 6. | "Hairy Christmas" (Willie Robertson and Luke Bryan with Phil, Uncle Si, Jase, Jep) | Chancie Neal, Jimmy Melton, Michael Mobley | 3:30 |
| 7. | "Baby, It's Cold Outside" (Missy and Jase Robertson) | Frank Loesser | 3:45 |
| 8. | "Duck the Halls" (Robertson Family) | Buddy Cannon, Willie Robertson, Jase Robertson, Korie Robertson, Missy Robertson | 2:29 |
| 9. | "Camouflage And Christmas Lights" (Reed Robertson) | Michael Logen, Andrew Dorff | 3:29 |
| 10. | "Rudolph the Red-Nosed Reindeer" (Sadie Robertson and Robertson kids with Uncle Si) | Johnny Marks | 2:41 |
| 11. | "The Night Before Christmas" (Si Robertson) | Willie Robertson | 3:41 |
| 12. | "Why I Love Christmas" (Missy Robertson with Josh Turner) | Josh Turner | 3:32 |
| 13. | "Silent Night" (Robertson family) | Traditional | 4:19 |
| 14. | "Phil's Prayer, Willie's Closing" | | 1:10 |

Walmart exclusive edition (bonus track)
| No. | Title | Writer(s) | Length |
|---|---|---|---|
| 13. | "Santa Looked a Lot Like Daddy" | Buck Owens, Don Rich |

== Personnel ==
Credits adapted from AllMusic

The Robertsons

- Robertson Kids — featured artist
- Jase Robertson — featured artist, arranger, primary artist
- Jep Robertson — featured artist
- Korie Robertson — arranger
- Missy Robertson — arranger, pre-production arranger, primary artist
- Phil Robertson — featured artist, primary artist
- Reed Robertson — primary artist
- Sadie Robertson — primary artist
- Uncle Si Robertson — featured artist, primary artist
- Willie Robertson — arranger, primary artist

Technical personnel

- Natthapol Abhigantaphard — assistant
- Eric Adkins — photography
- Daniel Baacigalupi — assistant
- Sorrel Brigman — assistant
- Jake Burns — assistant
- Buddy Cannon — arranger, production
- Tony Castle — engineer, mixing
- Leland Elliott — assistant
- Shannon Finnegan — production coordinator
- Tom Freitag — assistant
- Scott Frick — assistant
- Carl Gorodetzky — contractor
- Adam Grover — assistant
- Jonathan Harter — assistant
- Sam Howard — assistant
- Andrew Mendelson — mastering
- Karen Naff — art direction, design
- Ernesto Olvera — assistant
- Derek Parnell — assistant
- John Pirkey — pre-production arranger
- Eberhard Ramm — copyist
- Pamela Sixfin — concert mistress
- Bergen White — string arrangements, vocal arrangement
- Brian Wright — A&R

Additional musicians

- David Angell — strings
- Monisa Angell — strings
- Sam Bacco — percussion
- Wyatt Beard — background vocals
- Jim "Moose" Brown — piano
- Pat Buchanan — electric guitar
- Buddy Cannon — background vocals
- Melonie Cannon — background vocals
- Tony Castle — piano
- Jim Chapman — background vocals
- Janet Darnall — strings
- David Davidson — strings
- Beverly Drukker — strings
- Dan Dugmore — electric guitar, baritone guitar, steel guitar
- Conni Ellisor — violin
- Kevin "Swine" Grantt — bass guitar
- James Grosjean — strings
- Steve Herman — trumpet
- Steve Hinson — electric guitar, steel guitar
- Jim Horn — flute
- Jon Mark Ivey — background vocals
- Shane Keister — piano, synthesizer
- Elizabeth Lamb — strings
- Paul Leim — drums
- Jim Lotz — bassoon
- Randy McCormick — clavinet, Hammond B3, piano, synthesizer
- Liana Manis — background vocals
- Anthony La Marchina — strings
- Jon Mark — background vocals
- The Nashville String Machine — strings
- Daniel O'Lannerghty — bass guitar
- Mary Kathryn Van Osdale — strings
- Carole Rabinowitz — strings
- Mickey Raphael — harmonica
- John Wesley Ryles — background vocals
- Joe Scaife — percussion
- Lisa Silver — background vocals
- Pamela Sixfin — strings
- Kira Small — background vocals
- Denis Solee — clarinet
- Joe Spivey — fiddle
- Bobby Terry — acoustic guitar
- Dan Tyminski — acoustic guitar, mandolin
- Alan Umstead — strings
- Catherine Umstead — strings
- Bruce Wethey — strings
- Bergen White — piano, background vocals
- Kristin Wilkinson — strings
- John Willis — acoustic guitar, electric guitar, gut string guitar
- Lonnie Wilson — drums
- Karen Winkelmann — strings
- Cindy Wyatt — harp

== Charts and certifications ==
=== Weekly charts ===
| Chart (2013) | Peak position |
|---|---|
| Canadian Albums (Billboard) | 8 |
| US Billboard 200 | 3 |
| US Top Country Albums (Billboard) | 1 |
| US Top Holiday Albums (Billboard) | 1 |

=== Year-end charts ===
| Chart (2013) | Position |
|---|---|
| US Billboard 200 | 124 |
| US Top Country Albums (Billboard) | 31 |

| Chart (2014) | Position |
|---|---|
| Canadian Albums (Billboard) | 28 |
| US Billboard 200 | 18 |
| US Top Country Albums (Billboard) | 6 |

=== Decade-end charts ===
| Chart (2010–2019) | Position |
|---|---|
| US Billboard 200 | 165 |

=== Certifications ===
| Region | Certification | Certified units/sales |
|---|---|---|
| Canada (Music Canada) | Gold | 40,000^{^} |
| United States (RIAA) | Platinum | 807,000 |
^{^} Shipments figures based on certification alone.
