= Duck Commander =

American hunting products company and media franchise

Duck Commander, Inc.
- Duck Commander logo since 2000

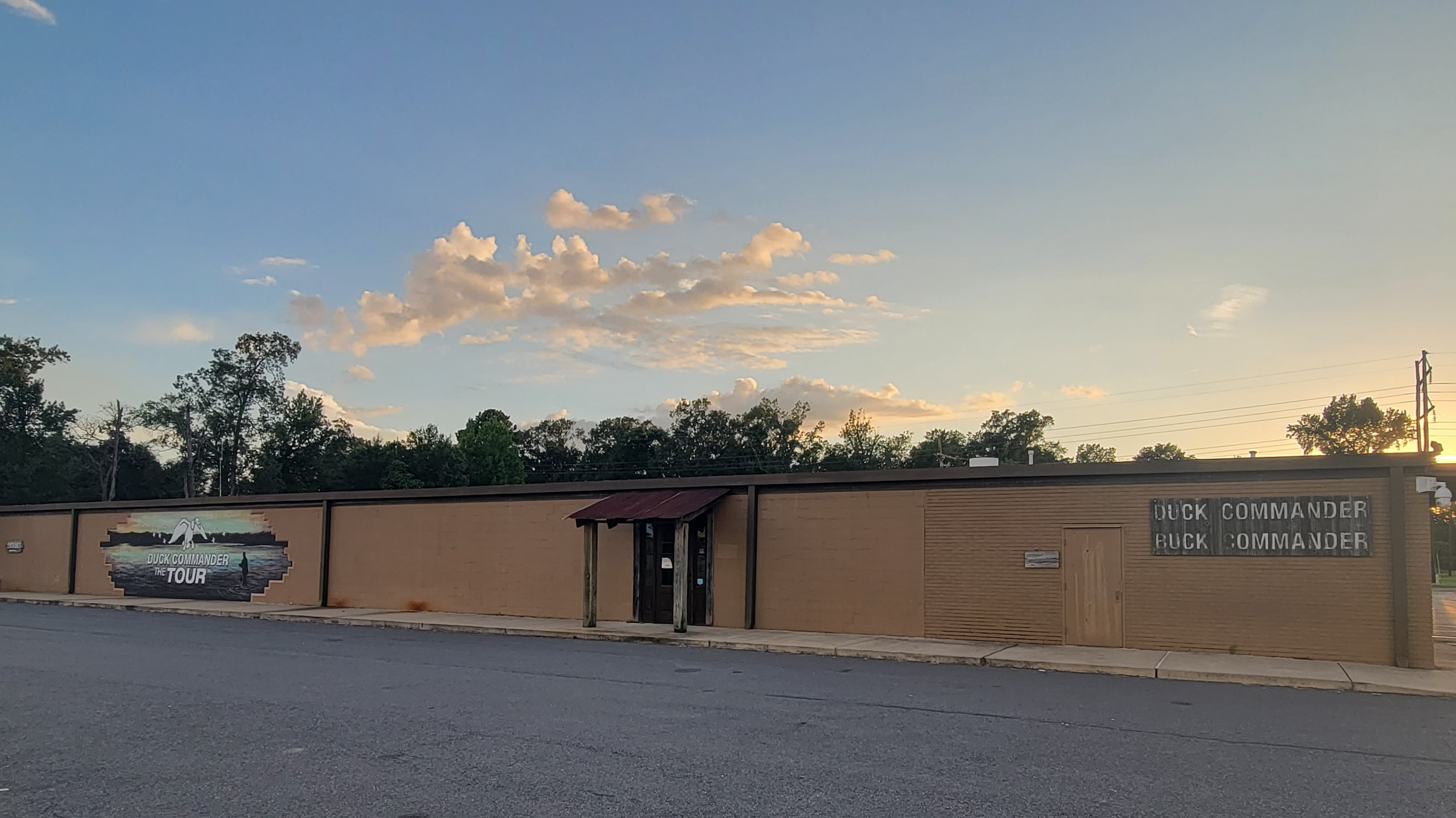
- Duck Commander, Inc. headquarters
- Type: Private
- Industry: Hunting; Apparel
- Founded: 1972
- Headquarters: West Monroe, Louisiana, U.S.
- Key people: Willie Robertson (CEO); Jase Robertson (COO); Kay Robertson (vice president); Phil Robertson (founder)
- Products: Duck calls; Buck calls; Turkey calls; accessories
- Owners: Willie Robertson; Jase Robertson; Jep Robertson
- Number of employees: 15 (2011); 75 (2012)
- Subsidiaries: Duck Dynasty; Buck Commander; Strut Commander; Fin Commander
- Website: duckcommander.com

Duck Commander's media franchise
- Created by: Duck Commander; Outdoor Channel; A&E; Blaze Media; Fox Entertainment
- Original work: Duckmen of Louisiana (1987)
- Owner: Duck Commander
- Years: 1987–present

Print publications
- Books: Si-cology 1; Miss Kay's Duck Commander Kitchen Cookbook; See bibliography

Films and television
- Film: The Blind (2023)
- Short film: Duckmen (1988–2017)
- Television series: Duck Commander, Buck Commander, and Fin Commander series on Outdoor Channel and YouTube; Duck Dynasty; Duck Family Treasure

Games
- Video games: Duck Dynasty on Steam, PlayStation 4, Xbox One; Duck Dynasty on Nintendo 3DS

Audio
- Original music: Duck the Halls: A Robertson Family Christmas

Duck Commander is an American hunting and outdoor recreation company in West Monroe, Louisiana. The company was founded by Phil Robertson, a football quarterback at Louisiana Tech University, who developed and patented the company's namesake duck call the Duck Commander. He began his business in a dilapidated boat, where he spent 25 years making duck calls from Louisiana cedar trees. Phil and Miss Kay's third son Willie Robertson is the company's chief executive officer. Willie and his wife Korie expanded the business into a multimillion-dollar enterprise. Besides duck-hunting equipment, they also manufacture deer-hunting merchandise under the Buck Commander brand, fishing gear with their Fin Commander brand, and turkey-hunting merchandise under the Strut Commander brand.

The Robertson family and business are known through their media franchise that has encompassed numerous productions over the years. Including books, video games, toys, and television series such as the Duck Commander, Buck Commander, Fin Commander television shows on the Outdoor Channel and social media, the reality television series Duck Dynasty on A&E, and Duck Family Treasure by Fox Entertainment. A theatrical film about Robertson family patriarch Phil and matriarch Kay was released in 2023, titled The Blind. They also have podcasts: Duck Call Room, hosted by Si, Martin, and Godwin; Unashamed, hosted by Phil, Jase, and Alan; and WHOA That's Good Podcast, hosted by Sadie Robertson.

Duck Commander founder Phil Robertson died in May 2025.

== Products ==
=== Duck Commander ===
==== Duck calls ====
Their hallmark product is their duck calls, particularly those designed by Phil Robertson and Jase Robertson. Duck calls are wind instruments, and learning of their unique reeds and design is required for proper usage. Their most popular varieties are the namesake Duck Commander call, the Jase Robertson Pro Series, the Triple Threat (using a triple reed system), the Cut Down 2.0, and others like specialty calls including The Flash Mallard Hen Duck Call and Mallard Drake Reedless Duck Call.

==== Face Camo ====
Duck Commander Face Camo is a face paint product, it is used by hunters, athletes, and actors, due to it being smudge-proof.

=== Buck Commander ===
Buck Commander is a brand of utilities such as chef cutting boards, and deer calls like the Lil' Doe Bleat can call, Grunt Call, and the Honcho Grunt Call.

=== Strut Commander ===
Strut Commander is a brand of turkey calls including mouth calls, slate calls and box calls.

=== Fin Commander ===
With the Fin Commander brand they sell individual fishing lures and fish hooks, for pan fish, bass, and trout. And kits such as the Crappie Magnet Kit, the Commander Godwin Kit, and the Commander Martin Kit.

=== Truck Commander ===
Truck Commander includes accessories and modifications for pickup trucks, sport utility vehicles, and off-road vehicles, intended for use by outdoors enthusiasts. Including floor mats, steering wheel covers, Duck Commander and Buck Commander decals, etc.

==== Buck Truck ====
Developed by Truck Hero and ROC & Design, the Buck Truck is a modification set available for Ford F-Series, GMC, Chevrolet, and Toyota trucks.

=== Other products ===
Numerous apparel and toy products have been created for Duck Commander, as well as its related brands and media franchise. This includes Halloween costumes, Funko figures, stuffed toys, shirts, etc. Other sporting brands sometimes partner with Duck Commander, such as Garrett Metal Detectors having metal detectors called the Garrett Jase Robertson Signature Edition APEX Metal Detector and the Garrett Jase Robertson Signature Edition AT MAX Metal Detector.

== Media franchise ==
The Duck Commander media franchise has been produced by numerous media production and broadcasting companies, including Outdoor Channel, A&E (Hearst Communications/The Walt Disney Company), Tyndale House, ABS-CBN, Blaze Media, Thomas Nelson, Activision, and Fox Entertainment. Usually in the genres of outdoors, sports (hunting, fishing, and metal detecting), reality, and Christian media.

=== Filmography ===
==== Television ====
Year	Title	Notes
1987–present	Duckmen	Direct-to-video series, the first episode "Duckmen of Louisiana" released in 1987. The 21-episode series has included episodes "Traditions", "How The West Was Won", "Duckmen of Middle Earth: New Zealand". Outdoors brands like Yeti continue to sponsor Duckmen videos for social media.
2009–present	Duck Commander	Originally aired on Outdoor Channel, originally sponsored by Benelli Armi SpA
2010–present	Buck Commander	Duck Commander Outdoor Channel originally sponsored by Under Armour, still ongoing as a mini-series on YouTube, features numerous celebrities including Luke Bryan, Adam LaRoche, Ryan Langerhans, Tom Martin, Jason Aldean, and Tyler Farr.
2012–2017	Duck Dynasty	A&E reality television show
2013	Jimmy Kimmel Live!	The Robertsons appeared on Jimmy Kimmel Live! Scheduled musical guest Morrissey canceled because he objected to being on the show with those he called "animal serial killers". The band Churchill filled in for Morrissey. Phil Robertson responded, saying, "Whoever he is, I don't hold it against him." In a parody skit, the Robertsons created a carrot call and a tea cup broccoli trap.
2013	Last Man Standing	The Robertsons guest-starred on Season 3, Episode 1 "Back to School".
2013	VeggieTales	Si Robertson narrated the episode "Merry Larry and the True Light of Christmas", and appears as an okra mall janitor.
2014	Duck Commander: Before the Dynasty	Episodes air on A&E, consisting of clips from the original series interspersed with modern-day commentary from members of the Robertson family. Aired between Seasons 6 and 7 of Duck Dynasty.
2014–2015	Dancing with the Stars	In Season 19 Sadie Robertson was a contestant with professional dance partner Mark Ballas. Members of the Robertson family appeared on several episodes, and in the semi-finals there was a Duck Commander themed samba to "Hunter" by Pharrell Williams, the song mentions Duck Dynasty and is from the album Girl. During Week 10 of season 20. The two finalists of season 19 reunited for a dance together, Alfonso Ribeiro and Sadie Robertson also danced with their professional dance partners Witney Carson and Mark Ballas.
2016–2017	Jep & Jessica: Growing the Dynasty	Follows Jep Robertson, Phil's youngest son, and his wife Jessica as they adopt a baby boy into their family on A&E.
2016–2017	Going Si-ral	Follows Si Robertson, Phil's brother, as he explores various quirks of the Internet on A&E.
2017–2022	In the Woods With Phil	Phil Robertson hosted show on Blaze Media.
2021	The Masked Singer	In Season 6 Willie Robertson performed as The Mallard. Songs he performed included "Save a Horse (Ride a Cowboy)" by Big & Rich, "My House" by Flo Rida, "Play Something Country" by Brooks & Dunn, and "Fly" by Sugar Ray. Though his costume was named after a mallard, it was actually a wood duck.
2022–present	Duck Family Treasure	A metal detecting show, which features metal detecting and history enthusiast Murray Crowe, alongside Jase and Jep Robertson.

==== Film ====
===== The Blind (2023) =====
The Blind is a 2023 biopic covering the early relationship of Phil and Kay Robertson. Phil Robertson is portrayed by Aron von Andrian, and Kay Robertson is portrayed by Amelia Eve. It was filmed in early 2022 in Shreveport, Louisiana.

==== Music videos ====
Year	Title	Notes
2013	"Wagon Wheel" by Darius Rucker	Darius Rucker falls to sleep watching Duck Dynasty, and proceeds to have a dream where the Robertsons help him get to a concert.
2015	"Cut 'Em All" by Colt Ford	A Duck Commander duck call can be heard as an instrument during the song, and Willie Robertson appears in both the song and music video.

=== Bibliography ===
==== Phil Robertson ====
- Robertson, Phil (2013). Happy, Happy, Happy: My Life and Legacy as the Duck Commander. Howard Books. ISBN 1476726094.
- Robertson, Phil (2014). unPHILtered. Howard Books. ISBN 1476766231.
- Robertson, Phil and Al Robertson (2014). The Duck Commander Bible: Faith and Family. Thomas Nelson. ISBN 0718016408.
- Robertson, Phil and Kay Robertson (2015). Exploring the Joy of Christmas: Stories, Recipes, Carols, and More. Salem Books. ISBN 1621574814.
- Robertson, Phil (2019). The Theft of America's Soul: Blowing the Lid Off the Lies That Are Destroying Our Country. Thomas Nelson. ISBN 1400210046.
- Robertson, Phil (2020). Jesus Politics: How to Win Back the Soul of America. Thomas Nelson. ISBN 1400210062.
- Robertson, Phil (2022). Uncanceled: Finding Meaning and Peace in a Culture of Accusations, Shame, and Condemnation. Thomas Nelson. ISBN 1400230179.

==== Willie Robertson ====
- Robertson, Willie (2012). The Duck Commander Family: How Faith, Family, and Ducks Created a Dynasty. Howard Books. ISBN 147670354X.
- Robertson, Willie (2015). American Hunter: How Legendary Hunters Shaped America. Howard Books. ISBN 1501111337.
- Robertson, Willie (2016). American Fisherman: How Our Nation's Anglers Founded, Fed, Financed, and Forever Shaped the U.S.A.. William Morrow. ISBN 0062465643.
- Robertson, Willie (2018). American Entrepreneur: How 400 Years of Risk-Takers, Innovators, and Business Visionaries Built the U.S.A.. William Morrow. ISBN 0062693417.

==== Jase Robertson ====
- Robertson, Jase (2014). Good Call: Reflections on Faith, Family, and Fowl. Howard Books. ISBN 1476763534.

==== Jep Robertson ====
- Robertson, Jep and Jessica Robertson (2015). The Good, the Bad and the Grace of God: What Honesty and Pain Taught Us About Faith, Family, and Forgiveness. Thomas Nelson. ISBN 0718031482.

==== Al Robertson ====
- Robertson, Al (2013) The Duck Commander Devotional. Howard Books. ISBN 9781476745558.
- Robertson, Al and Lisa Robertson (2015). A New Season: A Robertson Family Love Story of Brokenness and Redemption. Howard Books. ISBN 1476773203.
- Robertson, Al and Lisa Robertson (2016). The Duck Commander Devotional For Couples. Howard Books. ISBN 9781501126208.
- Robertson, Al and Lisa Robertson (2019). Desperate Forgiveness: How Mercy Sets You Free. Tyndale House. ISBN 9781589970311.

==== Kay Robertson ====
- Robertson, Kay (2013). Miss Kay's Duck Commander Kitchen: Faith, Family, and Food--Bringing Our Home to Your Table. Howard Books. ISBN 1476763208.
- Robertson, Kay (2014). The Women of Duck Commander: Surprising Insights From the Women Behind the Beards About What Makes This Family Work. Howard Books. ISBN 1476763305.
- Robertson, Kay (2014). D is for Duck Calls. Simon & Schuster. ISBN 148141819X.
- Robertson, Kay (2014). A Robertson Family Christmas. Tyndale House. ISBN 1414398204.
- Robertson, Kay (2015). Duck Commander Kitchen Presents Celebrating Family and Friends: Recipes For Every Month of the Year. Howard Books. ISBN 1476795738.

==== Korie Robertson ====
- Robertson, Korie (2014). Faith Commander: Living Five Values from the Parables of Jesus. Zondervan. ISBN 0310820332.
- Robertson, Korie (2015). Strong and Kind: And Other Important Character Traits Your Child Needs to Succeed. Thomas Nelson. ISBN 0718036883.
- Robertson, Korie (2015). Duck Commander: Devotions for Kids. Thomas Nelson. ISBN 0718022491.
- Robertson, Korie (2017). Duck Commander: Happy, Happy, Happy Stories for Kids. Thomas Nelson. ISBN 0718086279.

==== Missy Robertson ====
- Robertson, Missy (2015). Blessed, Blessed...Blessed: The Untold Story of Our Family's Fight to Love Hard, Stay Strong, and Keep the Faith When Life Can't Be Fixed. Tyndale Momentum. ISBN 1496405706.
- Robertson, Missy (2015). You are Blessed, Blessed...Blessed: A Four-Week Guided Experience for Individuals and Groups. Tyndale Momentum. ISBN 1496405714.
- Robertson, Missy and Mia Robertson (2018). Running From Reality. Zonderkidz. ISBN 0310762502.
- Robertson, Missy and Mia Robertson (2018). Allie's Bayou Rescue. Zonderkidz. ISBN 0310762472.
- Robertson, Missy and Mia Robertson (2018). Dog Show Disaster. Zonderkidz. ISBN 0310762529.
- Robertson, Missy and Mia Robertson (2018). Finding Cabin Six. Zonderkidz. ISBN 0310762545.

==== Lisa Robertson ====
- Robertson, Lisa (2019). The Path of Life: Walking in the Loving Presence of God. Thomas Nelson. ISBN 9780785223566.

==== Si Robertson ====
- Robertson, Si (2013). Si-cology 1: Tales and Wisdom from Duck Dynasty's Favorite Uncle. Howard Books. ISBN 1476745374.
- Robertson, Si (2014). Everything's Better with a Beard'. Simon & Schuster. ISBN 1481418173.
- Robertson, Si (2014). Uncle Si the Christmas Elf. Simon & Schuster. ISBN 1481418211.
- Robertson, Si (2017). Si-renity: How I Stay Calm and Keep the Faith. Howard Books. ISBN 1501135465.

==== Sadie Robertson ====
- Robertson, Sadie (2014). Live Original: How the Duck Commander Teen Keeps it Real and Stays True to Her Values. Howard Books. ISBN 1476777802.
- Robertson, Sadie (2016). Live Original Devotional. Howard Books. ISBN 1501126512.
- Robertson, Sadie (2016). Life Just Got Real. Howard Books. ISBN 1501126466.
- Robertson, Sadie (2018). Live Fearless: A Call to Power, Passion, and Purpose. Thomas Nelson. ISBN 1400309395.
- Robertson, Sadie (2020). Live: Remain Alive, Be Alive at a Specified Time, Have an Exciting or Fulfilling Life. Thomas Nelson. ISBN 1400213061.
- Robertson Huff, Sadie (2021). Live on Purpose: 100 Devotions for Letting Go of Fear and Following God. Thomas Nelson. ISBN 1400213096.

==== John Luke Robertson ====
- Robertson, John Luke (2016). Young and Beardless: The Search for God, Purpose, and a Meaningful Life. Thomas Nelson. ISBN 0718087909.
- Robertson, John Luke (2014). Jase & the Deadliest Hunt. Tyndale Kids. ISBN 9781496400086.
- Robertson, John Luke (2014). Willie's Redneck Time Machine. Tyndale Kids. ISBN 1414398131.
- Robertson, John Luke (2014). Si in Space. Tyndale Kids. ISBN 1414398158.
- Robertson, John Luke (2014). Phil & the Ghost of Camp Ch-Yo-Ca. Tyndale Kids. ISBN 141439814X.

=== Video games ===
==== Duck Dynasty (2014) ====
Duck Dynasty is a 2014 hunting video game published by Activision Blizzard and developed by Fun Labs. It was released on Steam, PlayStation 3, PlayStation 4, Xbox 360, and Xbox One. The game follows John Luke and fictional Cousin Beaux, the player plays as John Luke during various hunting and puzzle mini-games. The Nintendo 3DS version of Duck Dynasty was developed by Black Lantern Studios, and features a top-down perspective and the player controls a "New Guy" in the Duck Commander office, it has its own set of mini-games and is different from the console versions.

==== Duck Commander (2015) ====
Jakks Pacific developed a light gun shooter handheld TV game, the game featured a green and orange colored light gun.

==== Duck Dynasty slot machine (2015) ====
In 2015 Bally Technologies created a slot machine based on Duck Dynasty, the game was developed for the Alpha 2 Pro Series cabinet, and it features mini-games themed after frog hunting, archery, and duck hunting.

=== Music ===
==== Christmas album ====
The family released a Christmas album, Duck the Halls: A Robertson Family Christmas, on the UMG Nashville label on October 29, 2013.

===== Charts =====
Title	Details	Peak chart positions				Sales	Certifications
Title	Details	US	US Country	US Holiday	Canada	Sales	Certifications
Duck the Halls: A Robertson Family Christmas	Released: October 29, 2013; Label: UMG Nashville; Formats: CD, music download	3	1	1	8	US: 755,700	RIAA: Platinum; MC: Gold

===== Single =====
Year	Single	Peak chart positions		Album
Year	Single	US Country	US Country Airplay	Album
2014	"Hairy Christmas" (Willie Robertson and Luke Bryan)	49	45	Duck the Halls: A Robertson Family Christmas

=== Podcasts ===
Several podcasts have been produced about or by Duck Commander and the Robertson family. Including Unashamed by Phil, Jase, and Alan Robertson, The Duck Call Room hosted by Si, Martin, and Godwin, and WHOA That's Good Podcast by Sadie Robertson.

== Sports and sponsorships ==
=== Duck Commander 500 ===
In 2014, Duck Commander was the title sponsor of the Duck Commander 500, a NASCAR Sprint Cup Series stock car race held at Texas Motor Speedway in Fort Worth, Texas which had been previously sponsored by Samsung, DirecTV, Radio Shack, the National Rifle Association of America, and others. It was replaced by O'Reilly Auto Parts in 2017.

=== Duck Commander Independence Bowl ===
Duck Commander purchased in 2014 the naming rights for college football's Independence Bowl, held each year in Shreveport, Louisiana.

== Gallery ==
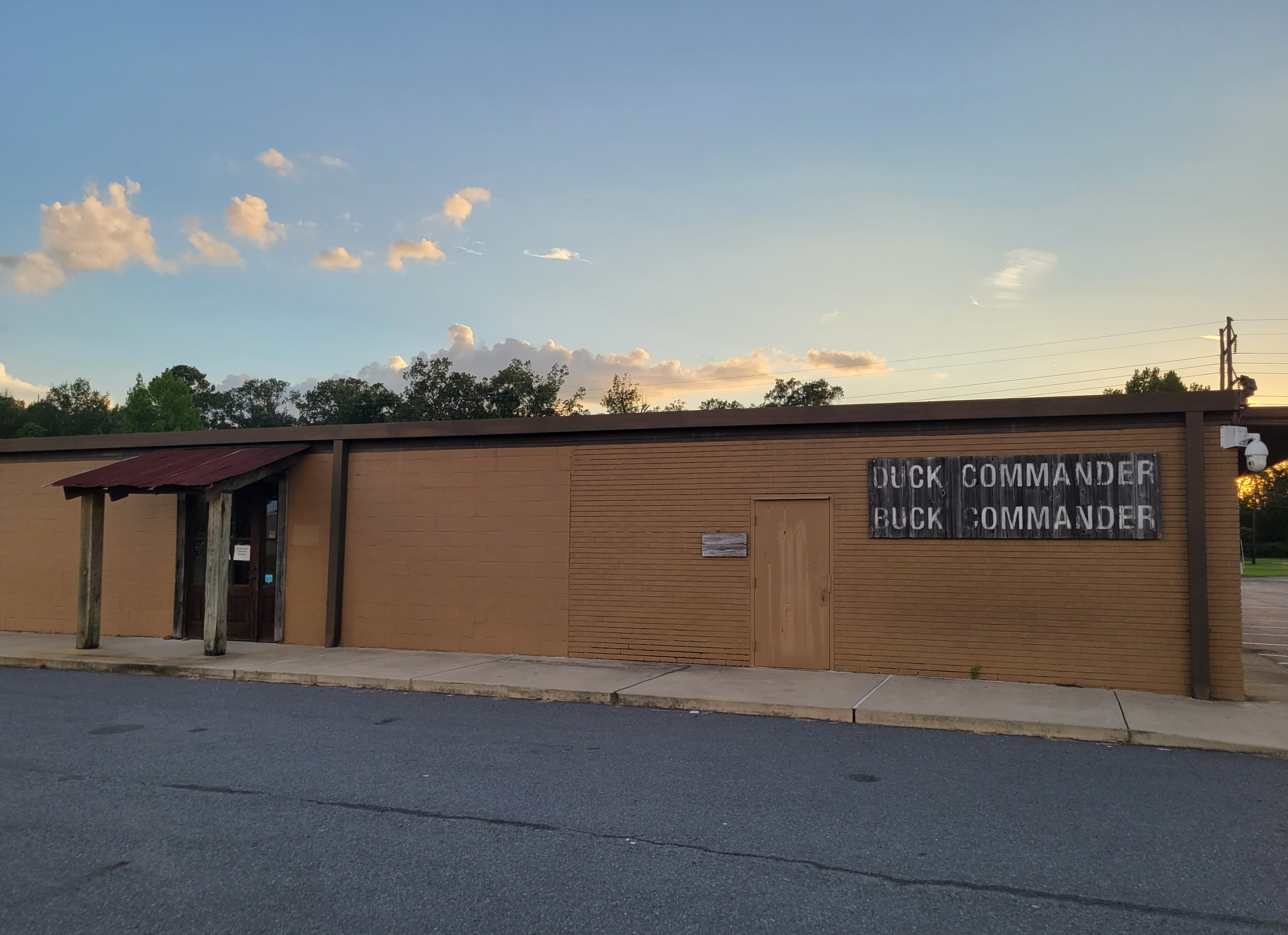
Duck Commander Headquarters-television show view

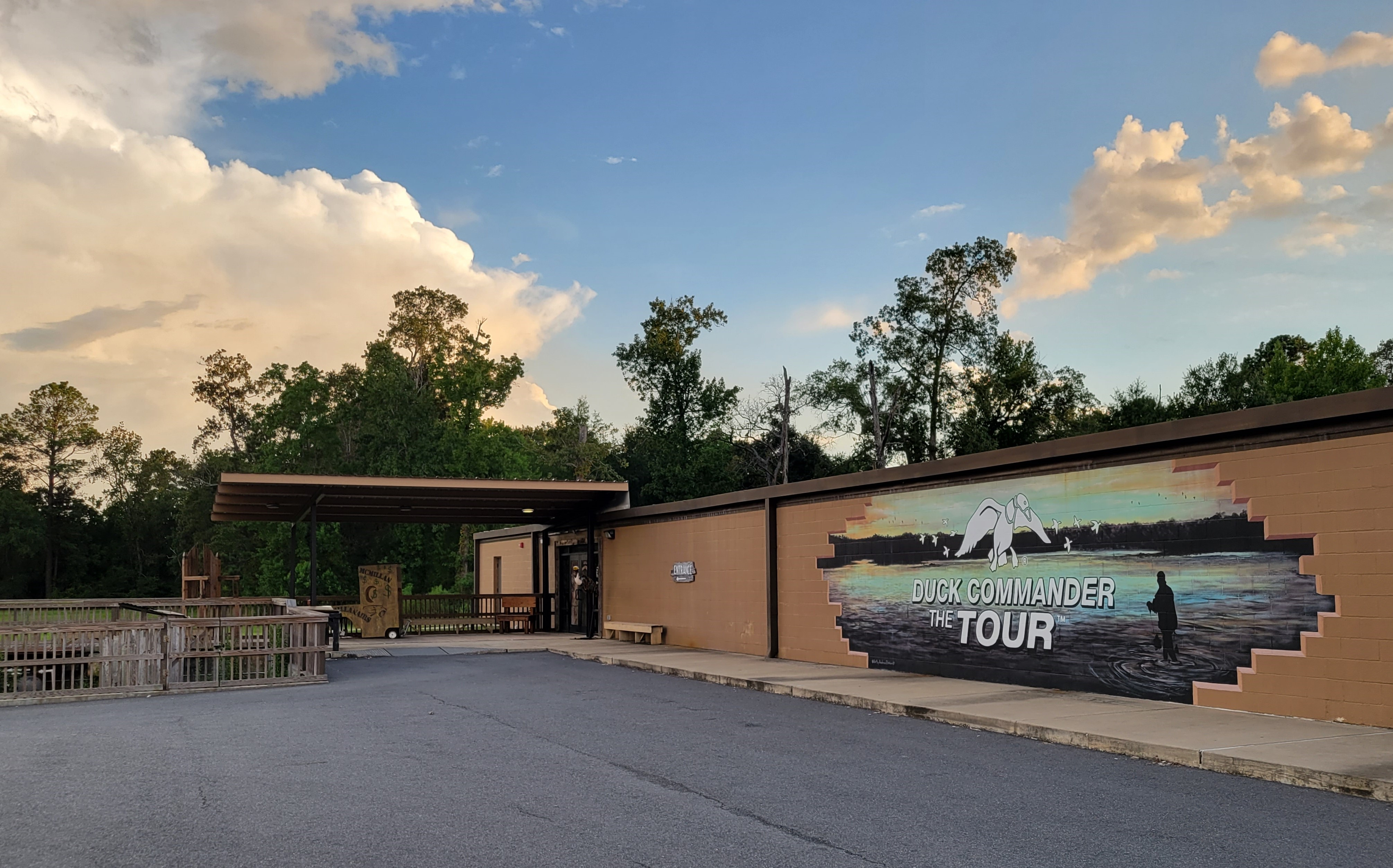
Duck Commander Headquarters-the tour

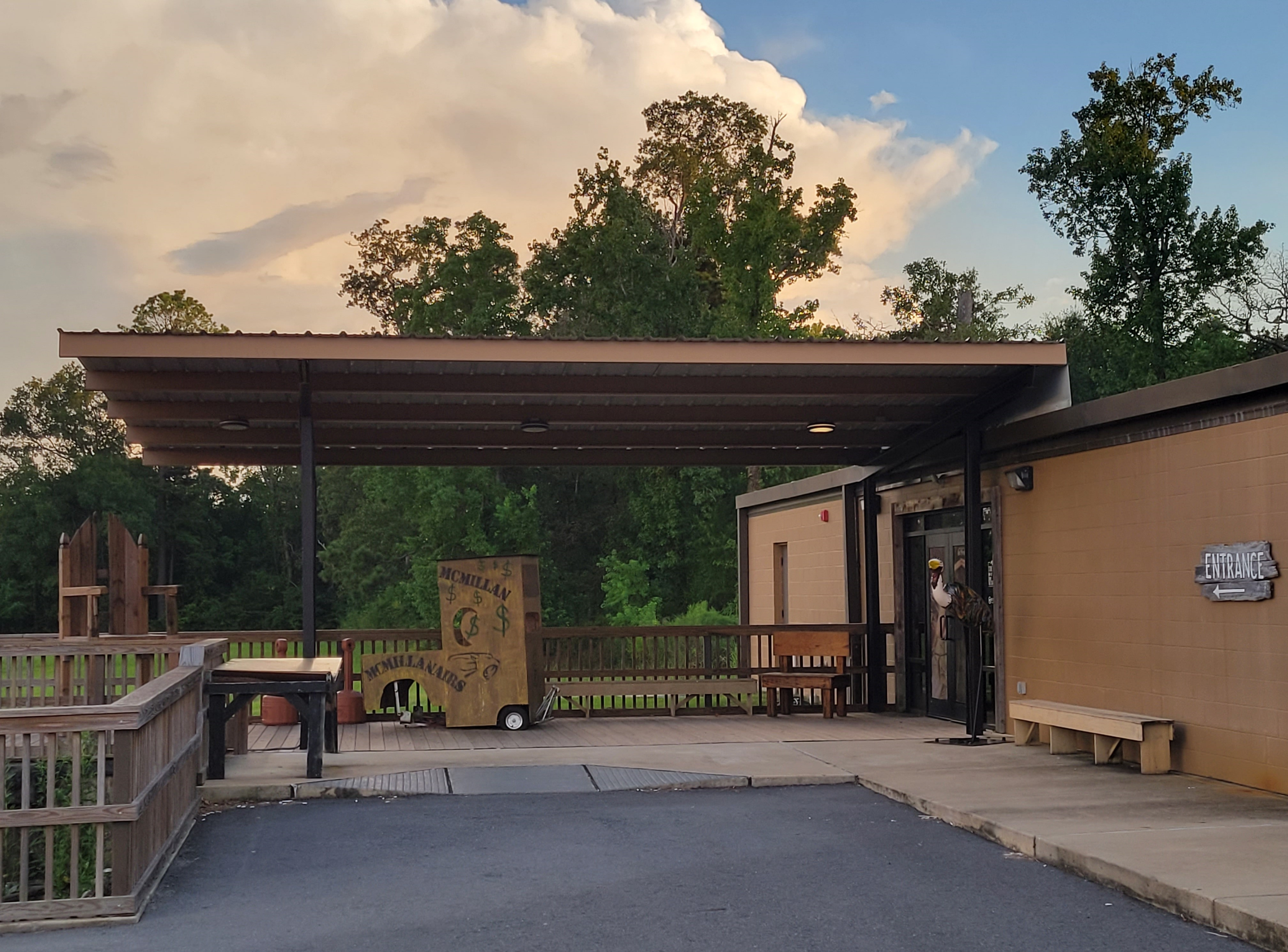
Duck Commander Headquarters-entrance
