= Phillip Livas =

American gridiron football player (born 1989)

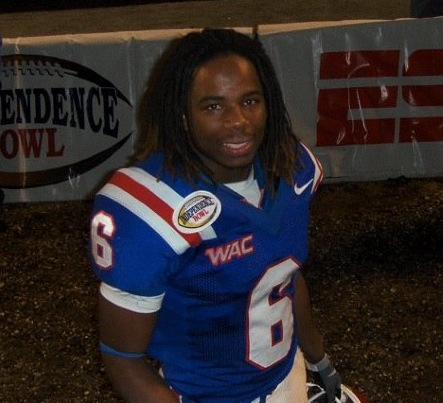
- Livas at the 2008 Independence Bowl

Profile
- Position: Wide receiver / Return specialist

Personal information
- Born: April 24, 1989 (age 37); Houma, Louisiana, U.S.
- Listed height: 5 ft 7 in (1.70 m)
- Listed weight: 179 lb (81 kg)

Career information
- High school: South Terrebonne (Bourg, Louisiana)
- College: Louisiana Tech
- NFL draft: 2011: undrafted

Career history
- Miami Dolphins (2011)*; Omaha Nighthawks (2011); Baltimore Ravens (2012)*; Saskatchewan Roughriders (2012)*; Edmonton Eskimos (2013)*
- * Offseason or practice squad member only

Awards and highlights
- Independence Bowl MVP (2008); 2× First–team All–WAC (2008, 2010); 1× Second–team All–WAC (2009); Tied NCAA record for most career TD returns (8)
- Stats at Pro Football Reference

Phillip Anthony Livas (born April 24, 1989) is an American former football wide receiver. In 2011, he was signed by the Miami Dolphins as an undrafted free agent in 2011 before being cut before the start of the regular season, and the Omaha Nighthawks of the United Football League before being released later in the season. He signed with the Saskatchewan Roughriders in October 2012, but has since been removed from the roster. He played college football at Louisiana Tech.

== Early life ==
Livas played football at South Terrebonne High School in Bourg, Louisiana for four years. He began his high school playing career as a starting safety in his freshmen year, but moved to the starting running back position for the remaining three years in high school. Livas was also the starting kick returner for South Terrebonne during his four years with the school. He received numerous individual awards including All-District honors (four times at kick returner and three times at running back), and first team All-State honors (once at kick returner and once at running back). Livas was the District 6-5A Offensive Player of the Year and the Houma Courier all-Regional MVP during both his junior and senior years. He ended his high school career in 2007 by helping to lead South Terrebonne High to the District 6-5A Title.

While at South Terrebonne High, Phillip Livas also played on the school's basketball team for three years and competed on the track and field team in the 100-meters race and for the 4x100-meter relay team. In his junior year, Livas's 4x100-meter relay team won the district and regional titles.

College recruiting
Name	Hometown	School	Height	Weight	40^{‡}	Commit date
Phillip Livas; RB	Houma, Louisiana	South Terrebonne HS	5 ft 9 in (1.75 m)	162 lb (73 kg)	4.33	Jan 29, 2007
Phillip Livas; RB	Recruit ratings: Scout: Rivals: (73)					
Overall recruit ranking: Scout: 80 (WR); 99 (school) Rivals: 34 (Louisiana); 89 (school)
‡ Refers to 40-yard dash; Note: In many cases, Scout, Rivals, 247Sports, On3, and ESPN may conflict in their listings of height, weight and 40 time.; In these cases, the average was taken. ESPN grades are on a 100-point scale.; Sources: "2007 Louisiana Tech Football Commitment List". Rivals.; "2007 La Tech College Football Team Recruiting Prospects". Scout.; "Louisiana Tech Bulldogs Football: 2007 Player Commits". ESPN.; "Scout.com Team Recruiting Rankings". Scout.; "2007 Team Ranking". Rivals.com.

== College career ==
After graduating in 2007, Livas attended Louisiana Tech University. Livas tied the NCAA record for most career touchdown returns with eight.

== Professional career ==
Pre-draft measurables
Height	Weight	40-yard dash	10-yard split	20-yard split	20-yard shuttle	Three-cone drill	Vertical jump	Broad jump	Bench press
5 ft 7 in (1.70 m)	179 lb (81 kg)	4.43 s	1.46 s	2.54 s	4.09 s	6.90 s	33.5 in (0.85 m)	9 ft 6 in (2.90 m)	12 reps
Values were taken at Louisiana Tech Pro Day.

=== Miami Dolphins ===
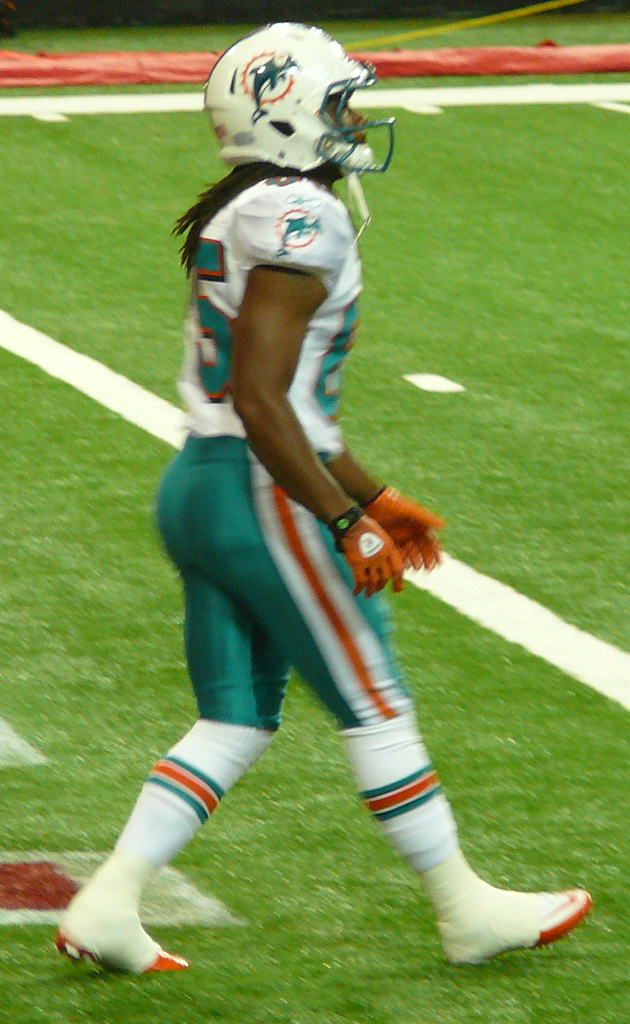
Livas with the Dolphins in 2011.

Livas signed as an undrafted free agent with the Miami Dolphins on July 26, 2011. In the Dolphins' first preseason game of the 2011 season, Livas handled the kickoff returns and punt returns for the team in the second half. Phillip Livas returned three kickoffs for a combined 84 yards and three punts for a combined 90 yards. Livas returned a punt 75 yards for a touchdown in the third quarter to help the Dolphins defeat the Atlanta Falcons 28–23. After handling most of the Dolphins' kickoff and punt return duties for the remainder of the preseason, Livas was cut by the Miami Dolphins on September 3, 2011.

=== Omaha Nighthawks ===
On September 6, 2011, Livas was signed by the Omaha Nighthawks of the United Football League.

=== Saskatchewan Roughriders ===
On October 3, 2012, Livas was signed by the Saskatchewan Roughriders of the Canadian Football League and placed on its Practice Roster.

=== Edmonton Eskimos ===
Livas was added to the Eskimos practice roster on July 2, 2013. He was released on July 12.
