= Markus Kramer =

Brand management professional and author

- Education: University of Oxford; University of California, Berkeley
- Occupations: Author, professor at Cass Business School
- Website: https://www.markuskramer.net

Markus Kramer is a Swiss brand consultant and author. He is an honorary senior visiting fellow in strategic brand management at Bayes Business School. Kramer is the author of The Guiding Purpose Strategy: a Navigational Code for Brand Growth and a cocreator of both the Responsible Investment Brand Index (RIBI) and the Swiss Private Banking Identity Index.

== Education and career ==
Kramer studied architecture and later obtained master's degrees from the University of California, Berkeley and the University of Oxford.

Early in his career, he worked in marketing and distribution roles for Harley-Davidson. He was appointed global marketing director for Aston Martin in 2009, a position he held for four years. In November 2013, Kramer left Aston Martin to join the brand consultancy Brand Affairs as a partner and managing director.

== Publications and indices ==
=== Books ===
- Kramer, Markus (2017). The Guiding Purpose Strategy: A Navigational Code for Brand Growth (2nd ed.). Clink Street Publishing. ISBN 978-1911525622.
- Kramer, Markus (Winter 2020–2021). "Driving Profit and Doing Good: The Transformational Power of Purpose". Journal of Brand Strategy. 9 (3): 231–239.

=== Industry indices ===
Kramer is the co-creator, along with Jean-François Hirschel, of the Responsible Investment Brand Index (RIBI). The index evaluates global asset managers on their commitment to responsible investing and how that commitment is integrated into their corporate brand identity. The evaluation of responsible investing utilizes Principles for Responsible Investment (PRI) transparency reports. The index's eighth edition, published in April 2026, evaluated 632 asset managers.

Kramer and Hirschel also publish the Swiss Private Banking Identity Index (SPBIx). The index scores Swiss-headquartered private banks on corporate identity and market activation indicators using publicly available metrics. The second edition of the index was released in January 2026 and evaluated 58 banking institutions.

== Bibliography ==
- The Guiding Purpose Strategy. Clink Street Publishing. October 2020. ISBN 978-1-912262-38-0.
