= Duck call =

Sound imitation to lure waterfowl

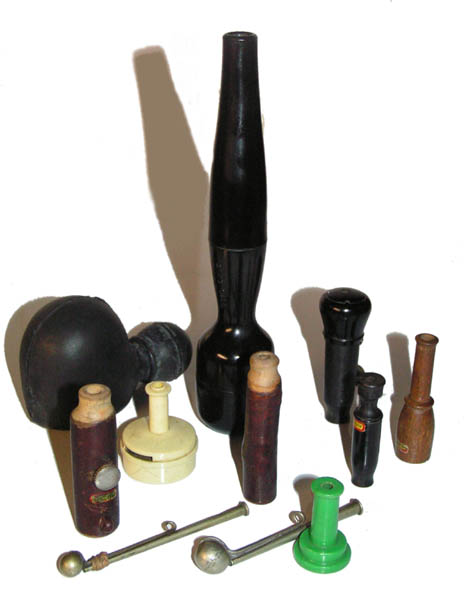
Collection of duck calls.

A duck call may be either the sound-imitation process used in waterfowl hunting, by which a hunter lures waterfowl, or the actual tool which the person uses to do so. Early duck call tools were basic woodwind instruments, while later innovations are constructed of rubber and plastic, and allow the hunter to adjust the volume and tone of the calls with reeds. Today's duck calls usually fall into three main categories: single, double, or triple reed call with many variations, although the triple reed is rare. The goal of a duck call is to sound like a realistic live duck, in attempts to decoy, or fool a duck into believing the decoys that are seen by a duck, and the sound that is heard appears lifelike.

== Construction ==
As a tool, a duck call is like a traditional whistle made to emulate the sound of a duck. Early duck calls were simple woodwind instruments with a barrel, a sound board and a cork that is used to hold the reed in place on the sound board, make up what is known as the insert. The insert is the end in which the sound is produced. Hunters would use the air from their diaphragms into the call while saying "hut", "wuit", or "oak" to make the single quack. In order for a hunter to make the feeding call, the hunter must say a quick repetition of "tiki-tika" or "duga-duga". With the improvement of calls and calling techniques the more experienced callers do not use their voice to perform their techniques. The more experienced callers simply push the air from their diaphragms with no words to be spoken into the call. There are many other variations and techniques to make effective sounds with a duck call.

The two most common high-quality duck call materials are wood and acrylic. The key difference between wood and acrylic duck calls is that acrylic calls are much louder and carry much further than wood duck calls. This is important for different types of duck hunting. Different waterfowl hunters have varying opinions on what the best type of duck call is and when it is most effective. It boils down to personal opinion. Acrylic calls are preferred in large open spaces for a call to reach out and find the ducks. Most acrylic calls have the capability of getting much louder than double reed calls. When hunting in timber or swampy area, a wood call is preferable. Another key difference is that acrylic is known to show less sound variance over the temperature ranges expected in a duck blind.

Wood expands and contracts with the changing temperature and humidity levels. It is still the preferred call, as it is more time-consuming to manufacture and design. However, decorative duck calls can be quite elaborate and expensive.

== History ==
Before the mass production and popularization of duck calls, hunters used their own voices (mouth calling) or used call ducks or duck decoys. This dates back to 1678, but it is believed that the use of call ducks originated in the Far East. Hunters would feed wild tame ducks and trap them, using their calls to attract wildfowl.

Non-patent duck calls may have been made as early as 1850, but the first patent was awarded to Elam Fisher in 1870. In 1863, Fred Allen had created external duck calls, but did not have a patent. Allen's calls were barrel calls with straight tone boards and curved reeds. His most unusual call was the “Allen Nickel-Plated Duck Caller” which was made of metal but froze to the hunters' lips and had to be re-made using wood. Fisher was famous for the production of his Tongue Pincher Duck Calls which were made of two pieces of curved wood facing each other with a metal reed sandwiched between them and a holding device (usually a band) holding it all together. Tongue Pinchers had limited tone range and often cut the hunters' tongues and mouths. Fred Allen was the first to sell his duck calls commercially and began advertisements in 1880. David Fuller was the first to receive the patent for the goose call in 1885 and impacted the duck hunting world in 1903 with his combination goose/duck call. This call had a screw that retracted from inside the barrel which changed the sounds that were produced. In the early 1890s a blacksmith by the name of Victor Glodo Jr. began producing duck calls, he is credited with the barrel shape, his signature copper reeds and using the “duck wing” checkered pattern. Glodo Jr.'s most well-known production is the Reelfoot Lake Style duck call.

From 1900 to 1910 many modifications were made to duck calls such as; the straight tone boards were replaced with curved ones, wedges were replaced with groove and cork locking systems, and there began to be production of duck calls made out of materials other than wood such as rubber and acrylic.

Phillip Sanford Olt from Pekin, IL was one of the most widely distributed duck calls in the 1900s. He began his duck call company in 1904 with his Arkansas Style duck call which has a straight reed and curved tone board. Most made today still use this same technique. Olt received a patent in 1905 for the first adjustable tone duck call. It was made of a strong hard rubber-plastic that allowed hunters to change the volume and tone of the call. In 1950, Olt developed the Model D-2 Keyhole, which became incredibly popular. Many hunters would modify it to change the sounds and eventually this led to the production of the “cutdown” duck call. Olt's calls were mostly made of rubber and wood, but he did produce some acrylic models.

Through 1920-1930s several new duck calls were produced using different styles or techniques to produce different kinds of sounds. Mid-1920s a man named Charles Ditto produced a duck call called the Eureka Model. It was made of two parts and contained a hard rubber insert and brass reed. Mid-1930 through the 1950s, father and son Clarence and Dudley Faulk produced some of the first plastic duck calls as well as several wooden ones. In 1935 using live ducks was outlawed, in the United States and the demand for duck calls increased incredibly.

By the 1950s custom call makers were showing up everywhere with the ability to engrave duck calls, include different colors or patterns and generally just make duck calls more showy/fancy.

In the early 1940s George Yentzen and his partner Cowboy Fernandez designed, invented, and patented the first double and triple reed duck calls from Black Walnut wood. The first double reed patent was submitted on March 7, 1946, by Yentzen, but did not get approved until September 3, 1950, because only war relief related patents were approved up until 1950. Yentzen died in 1959 prompting Cowboy to take over and start the Sure-Shot Game Call Company, with the most popular Yentzen Double Reed Duck Call. Cowboy won the World Championship and was also crowned the Champion of Champions in Stuttgart, Arkansas in 1959. He was the first Texan to win the two prestigious titles, and marked the first time the World Championship of Duck Calling using a double reed duck call. The Yentzen and Sure-Shot Game Calls dominated commercial markets for the next 20 years and beyond.

In 1972, Phil Robertson created his version of the famous Duck Commander Call. He started his Duck Commander Company in 1973. His product and name have become increasingly famous since his son, Willie Robertson, turned the company from a family business into a multimillion-dollar empire. Their name and product became even more famous after their show, Duck Dynasty, aired on March 21, 2012.

In 1980, the rock band Genesis used duck calls, listed on the sleeve as 'duck', to trigger sounds on a Yamaha CS-80 polyphonic synthesiser when recording their album 'Duke'.

In 2012, Kirk McCullough created his version of the "cutdown" call. This call has a threaded barrel and threaded insert for consistent sound. This design came from Kirk using Olts in the past and the hard rubber relaxing causing the caller to sometimes lose the insert when hunting. Kirk also included a centralizer to insure the reed was always seated in the same spot.

The two most popular styles of duck calls are the Arkansas style and the Louisiana style. The style is determined by the shape of the tone board and the effect it has on the reed material.

== Technique ==
There are many different schools of thought on what technique is best for imitating the sounds that ducks make; however, every duck call should be able to create three basic calls: the quack, the feed call, and the comeback or hail call. The quack is a short, sharp note that is the most used in waterfowl hunting. The feed is a sequence of rapid short notes of varying pitch that imitate ducks eating. The hail call or comeback call are the loudest and longest notes, typically used to attract the attention of far away ducks.

== Duck varieties ==
The most prevalent and hunted duck in the United States, the mallard, makes the well known "quack" sound many associate with ducks. Other species make many different sounds, ranging from high-pitched whistles to very low, grunt-like quacks. There are calls for almost all species of ducks. Pintails, teal, wood ducks, gadwall, diving ducks and other ducks including the calls of both the male, or drake and the female, or hen.

In many species, the call of the drake (male) is different from that of the hen (female). Mallard drakes make a lower pitch, longer quack than the hen mallard. This call is often used while feeding and when a mallard drake is landing. It gives the other birds a heads up. The quack of a mallard drake requires voice and is replicated by humming into a special whistle-like call. In teals, the drakes make a call of short bursts of a high pitch whistle. The "teet! (pause) teet! (pause) teet!-teet!" or any other order of repetition. This call can be made by blowing short bursts of air into the whistle.

The majority of duck sounds such as quacking people have heard and are familiar with comes from female, or hen, mallards. Hen mallards are extremely vocal and this is probably why the number one call for duck hunting in North America is a hen mallard call. By making your call sound similar to that of a hen mallard, almost all other ducks will respond to it, and have their curiosity piqued by the calling.

== See also ==
- Waterfowl hunting
