= 2008 Northern Illinois Huskies football team =

American college football season

2008 Northern Illinois Huskies football

Independence Bowl, L 10–17 vs. Louisiana Tech
- Conference: Mid-American Conference
- West Division
- Record: 6–7 (5–3 MAC)
- Head coach: Jerry Kill (1st season)
- Offensive coordinator: Matt Limegrover (1st season)
- Defensive coordinator: Tracy Claeys (1st season)
- MVP: Larry English
- Captains: Eddie Adamski; Britt Davis; Larry English; Alex Krutsch; Tim McCarthy; Dan Nicholson; Craig Rusch; Matt Simon
- Home stadium: Huskie Stadium

2008 Mid-American Conference football standings
	Conf.			Overall
Team	W		L	W		L
East Division
Buffalo x$	5	–	3	8	–	6
Bowling Green	4	–	4	6	–	6
Temple	4	–	4	5	–	7
Ohio	3	–	5	4	–	8
Akron	3	–	5	5	–	7
Kent State	3	–	5	4	–	8
Miami (OH)	1	–	7	2	–	10
West Division
Ball State x	8	–	0	12	–	2
Central Michigan	6	–	2	8	–	5
Western Michigan	6	–	2	9	–	4
Northern Illinois	5	–	3	6	–	7
Toledo	2	–	6	3	–	9
Eastern Michigan	2	–	6	3	–	9
Championship: Buffalo 42, Ball State 24
$ – Conference champion; x – Division champion/co-champions

The 2008 Northern Illinois Huskies football team represented Northern Illinois University as a member of the West Division of the Mid-American Conference (MAC) during the 2008 NCAA Division I FBS football season. Led by first-year head coach Jerry Kill, the Huskies compiled an overall record of 6–7 with a mark of 5–3 in conference play, placing fourth in the MAC's West Division. Northern Illinois was invited to the Independence Bowl, where they lost to Louisiana Tech. The team played home games at Huskie Stadium in DeKalb, Illinois.

== Schedule ==
Date	Time	Opponent	Site	TV	Result	Attendance
August 30	6:00 pm	at Minnesota*	Hubert H. Humphrey Metrodome; Minneapolis, MN	BTN	L 27–31	44,029
September 6	6:00 pm	at Western Michigan	Waldo Stadium; Kalamazoo, MI		L 26–29	26,262
September 20	2:00 pm	Indiana State*	Huskie Stadium; DeKalb, IL	CSNC	W 48–3	20,936
September 27	12:00 pm	at Eastern Michigan	Rynearson Stadium; Ypsilanti, MI	ESPN Plus	W 37–0	17,159
October 4	6:00 pm	at Tennessee*	Neyland Stadium; Knoxville, TN	PPV	L 9–13	99,539
October 11	3:00 pm	Miami (OH)	Huskie Stadium; DeKalb, IL	CSNC	W 17–13	17,444
October 18	3:00 pm	Toledo^{†}	Huskie Stadium; DeKalb, IL	CSNC	W 38–7	22,092
October 25	3:00 pm	Bowling Green	Huskie Stadium; DeKalb, IL	CSNC	W 16–13	17,163
November 5	7:00 pm	at Ball State	Scheumann Stadium; Muncie, IN (Bronze Stalk Trophy)	ESPN2	L 14–45	14,373
November 12	7:00 pm	Central Michigan	Huskie Stadium; DeKalb, IL	ESPN2	L 30–33 ^{OT}	13,543
November 18	6:00 pm	at Kent State	Dix Stadium; Kent, OH		W 42–14	2,267
November 25	6:00 pm	Navy*	Huskie Stadium; DeKalb, IL	ESPNC	L 0–16	17,950
December 28	8:15 pm	at Louisiana Tech*	Independence Stadium; Shreveport, LA (Independence Bowl)	ESPN	L 10–17	41,567
*Non-conference game; ^{†}Homecoming; All times are in Central time

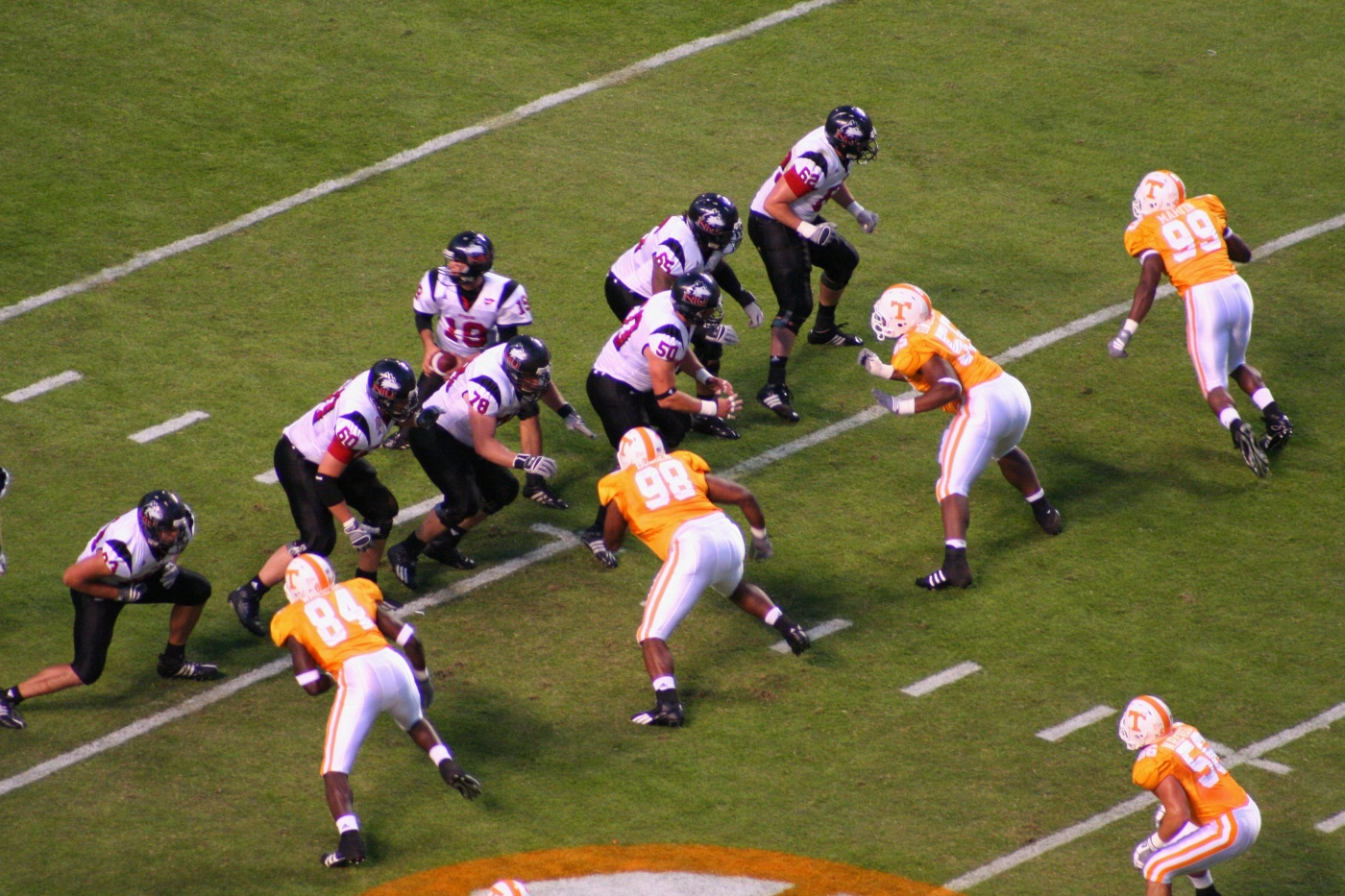
Northern Illinois on offense against Tennessee

== Coaching staff ==
- Jerry Kill, head coach
- Tracy Claeys, defensive coordinator
- Matt Limegrover, offensive coordinator
- Pat Poore, quarterbacks coach
- Rob Reeves, running backs coach
- Brian Anderson, tight ends coach
- Harold Etheridge, offensive line coach
- P. J. Fleck, wide receivers coach, recruiting coordinator
- Tom Matukewicz, linebackers coach
- Jay Sawvel, defensive backs, special teams coach
- Jeff Phelps, defensive line coach
- Brad Brachear, graduate assistant (defense)
- Nate Griffin, graduate Assistant (video)
- Nick Deuel, video coordinator
- Brad Kopp, assistant video coordinator
- Brandon Staley, graduate assistant (recruiting, operations)
- Marc Webel, graduate Assistant (offense)
- Adam Clark, director of football operations
- Eric Klein, sports performance
