= Candriam =

American subsidiary

CANDRIAM
- Formerly: Dexia Asset Management
- Industry: Asset Management
- Founded: 1996; 30 years ago
- Headquarters: Luxembourg
- Key people: Vincent Hamelink CEO
- AUM: ▲€163 billion (as at 31 December 2025)
- Owner: New York Life (67%) and Belfius Bank (33%)
- Number of employees: 598 (2026)
- Website: www.candriam.com

Candriam is a global multi-specialist asset management firm headquartered in Luxembourg. The company offers investment solutions across fixed income, equities, absolute return, multi-asset, and private markets. It operates 11 offices globally, with investment management centers in Brussels, Luxembourg, Paris, and London.

== History ==
- 1996: Launch of company and its first Sustainable and Responsible Investment (SRI) strategy.
- 2001: Creation of the ESG analysis team.
- 2006: Becomes a signatory of the United Nations Principles for Responsible Investment (UN PRI).
- 2014: Rebrands as Candriam ("Conviction AND Responsibility In Asset Management") following its acquisition by NYLIM.
- 2017: Launch of Candriam Academy, the first free-to-access, accredited online education platform dedicated to ESG investing.
- 2019: Achieves full carbon neutrality for all Scope 1, 2, and 3 emissions.
- 2020: Expands multi-asset capabilities through the acquisition of Rothschild & Co Asset Management Europe's alternative multi-asset business.
- 2021: Acquires a majority stake in Tristan Capital Partners, a leading European real estate investment manager, expanding its footprint in private markets.
- 2022: Establishes a joint venture in Private Debt Impact investing with Kartesia; publishes Climate Strategy.
- 2023: Vincent Hamelink appointed CEO, succeeding Naïm Abou-Jaoudé.
- 2024: Launches long-short sustainable strategy and Biodiversity Strategy; introduces a unified Alternatives Platform managing €23 billion.
- 2025: Belfius acquired a 33% strategic stake in Candriam.

== Business and Investment Philosophy ==
Candriam is known for its conviction-based investment approach, combining fundamental, quantitative and ESG insights. As of December 2025, over 75% of Candriam's assets were sustainability-related assets. Candriam maintains strict exclusion and engagement policies in the industry, excluding controversial weapons, thermal coal, and tobacco from its portfolios.

== Responsible Investing Leadership ==
Candriam is regarded as a leader in responsible investing, a position it has held for close to three decades. It was one of the first asset managers to integrate ESG criteria across its entire investment process. The firm engages actively with companies and policymakers and regularly publishes research and position papers on sustainability issues.

== Candriam Academy ==
Launched in 2017, the Candriam Academy is the world's first free, accredited online training platform dedicated to sustainable investing. By 2025, it had over 19,000 registered users across six languages, helping to raise awareness and knowledge of responsible finance among financial professionals.

== Recognition and Awards ==
Candriam has received multiple industry awards for its ESG strategies, stewardship, and innovation in investment solutions. It is regularly ranked among the top responsible investors by independent ESG rating agencies.
